= Treble & Reverb =

Studio album by Aaradhna
- Released: 9 November 2012
- Genre: R&B
- Length: 96:01
- Label: Dawn Raid Entertainment
- Producers: Aaradhna, Brotha D, Nate D, Mareko, P-Money, Evan Short, Sol Messiah

Aaradhna chronology
| Sweet Soul Music (2008) | Treble & Reverb (2012) | Brown Girl (2016) |

Singles from Treble & Reverb
- 1. "Wake Up" Released: August 2012

Treble & Reverb is the third studio album by New Zealand recording artist Aaradhna, released on 9 November 2012. A deluxe edition was released on 22 October 2013 with an extra disc of songs.

== Composition ==
The album contains doo-wop and 1960s pop music influences.

== Release and reception ==
Treble & Reverb was released in New Zealand by Dawn Raid Entertainment on 9 November 2012. Lydia Jenken of The New Zealand Herald gave the album three and a half stars out of five, and wrote that it is too long and repetitive. Treble & Reverb entered the New Zealand Albums Chart at its peak position of number fourteen, and spent a total of eighteen weeks on the chart.

=== Accolades ===
The album received several nominations at the 2013 New Zealand Music Awards and won Album of the Year, Best Urban/Hip Hop Album, Best Pacific Music Album and Best Female Solo Artist.

Treble & Reverb was also a finalist for the 2013 Taite Music Prize.

== Track listing ==
Track credits adapted from the album's liner notes. Except where noted, all tracks are written by Aaradhna Patel, Peter Wadams, and Evan Short.

Standard edition
| No. | Title | Writer(s) | Length |
|---|---|---|---|
| 1. | "Treble & Reverb" (Intro) | | 0:56 |
| 2. | "Wake Up" | | 3:51 |
| 3. | "Keep My Cool" | | 3:54 |
| 4. | "Lorena Bobbitt" | | 3:03 |
| 5. | "Great Man" | Patel; Wadams; Short; Aayushya Patel | 3:07 |
| 6. | "Bob's Your Uncle" | Aar. Patel; Chris Scholar | 4:11 |
| 7. | "Can We Go Back" | Aar. Patel; Wadams; Short; Aay. Patel | 3:19 |
| 8. | "Fire Burning Love" | | 4:13 |
| 9. | "Back of My Mind" | | 2:40 |
| 10. | "I'm Not the Same" | | 3:21 |
| 11. | "Burned It Up" | Aar. Patel; Chris John Heintz | 4:40 |
| 12. | "Miss Lovely" | Aar. Patel; George Archie | 4:42 |
| 13. | "Cool Shoes" | | 4:02 |
| 14. | "Sit With a Slouch" | | 3:39 |
| 15. | "Crying Like a Wolf" | | 3:11 |
| 16. | "You Don't Love Me Anymore" | Aar. Patel; N. Audino; L. Hughes | 4:53 |
| 17. | "Treble & Reverb" (Outro) | | 0:35 |

Deluxe edition bonus disc
| No. | Title | Writer(s) | Length |
|---|---|---|---|
| 1. | "Wake Up" (US Remix) (featuring Common) |
| 2. | "Celebration Flow" (featuring Talib Kweli and P-Money) | Wadams; Aar. Patel; Talib Kweli Greene |
| 3. | "Let's Stay Together" | Al Green; Willie Mitchell |
| 4. | "Back of My Mind" (US Remix) (featuring Calvin Richardson) |
| 5. | "I Love You Too" | Aar. Patel; N. Holmes; T. Leaoasavaii |
| 6. | "Sunshine of My Life" | Stevie Wonder |
| 7. | "Down Time" | Aar. Patel; Holmes; Leaoasavaii; L. Tupa'i |
| 8. | "Getting Stronger" (featuring Adeaze) | F. Tupa'i; L. Tupa'i |
| 9. | "Soul Food (The Island Way)" (featuring Mareko and Baby Downn) | Mark Sagapolutele; Aar. Patel; Leaoasavaii; T. Foisia |
| 10. | "Like You" (featuring Monsta) | Audino; Hughes; D. Lino; Aar. Patel |
| 11. | "They Don't Know" (featuring Savage) | Demetrius Savelio; Sagapolutele; David Puniani; Ernest Franklin |

== Personnel ==
Personnel credits adapted from the album's liner notes.

- Aaradhna – co-production, vocals
- Chris (Toma) Amosa – Clavinet, Fender Rhodes, organ, piano
- Kylie Cooke – styling
- Brotha D – executive production
- Troy Goodall – photography
- Jess Hindin – violin (8, 11, 14, 15)
- Andy Hurnane – executive production
- Joel Kefali – art direction, design
- Richard Singleton – horns (5)
- Evan Short – executive production, mastering, mixing, bass guitar, guitars
- Jono Tan – horns (5)

== Charts ==
| Chart (2012) | Peak position |
|---|---|
| New Zealand Albums (RMNZ) | 14 |

== Certifications ==
Certifications for Treble & Reverb
| Region | Certification | Certified units/sales |
|---|---|---|
| New Zealand (RMNZ) | Platinum | 15,000^{‡} |
^{‡} Sales+streaming figures based on certification alone.
