= Sione's Wedding (soundtrack) =

Soundtrack album by Various artists
- Released: March 2006
- Genre: Pop
- Label: Dawn Raid Entertainment
- Producer: Various artists

Singles from Sione's Wedding (soundtrack)
- 1. "I Do Believe" Released: January 2006

Sione's Wedding is the soundtrack to the New Zealand film, Sione's Wedding. It was released alongside the film in 2006 by Dawn Raid Entertainment.

== Track listing ==
1. Brothaz - Nesian Mystik
2. Move, Make Way - Savage featuring Tyree and PNC
3. I Can See - Ladi 6
4. I Do Believe - Tha Feelstyle featuring Mareko, Flowz, Lapi Mariner & Manuel Bundy
5. Let's Stay Together - Adeaze
6. Forever - Aaradhna featuring Kevin Soul
7. Better Than Change - Dallas & Mu
8. They Don't Know - Savage featuring Aaradhna
9. Gold - Verse Two
10. Knowing You (Classic '96 Symphonic Version) - Jamoa Jam
11. A Life With You - Adeaze
12. For Today - Netherworld Dancing Toys
13. Chillin' - Deceptikonz
14. Su'amalie - Tha Feelstyle
15. Whateva - Dei Hamo
16. Knowing You - Aaradhna
