= Shine: The Best of Annie Crummer =

Greatest hits album by Annie Crummer
- Released: 2002
- Label: Warner

Annie Crummer chronology
Seventh Wave (1996)	Shine: The Best of Annie Crummer (2002)

Shine: The Best of Annie Crummer is a greatest hits album by New Zealand singer Annie Crummer, released in 2002. It peaked at No. 25 on the New Zealand albums chart. The New Zealand Herald rated the album 3/5 stars, praising the new track "Love Not War."

== Track listing ==
No.	Title	Writer(s)	Length
1.	"See What Love Can Do" (from Language, 1992)	Jerry Lynn Williams	4:35
2.	"Language" (from Language)	Annie Crummer; Don Freeman; David Batteau	5:30
3.	"State of Grace" (from Seventh Wave, 1996)	Crummer; Barbara Griffin	4:19
4.	"U Soul Me" (from Seventh Wave)	Crummer; Griffin	3:49
5.	"Asian Paradise" (by When the Cat's Away) (from Live in Paradise, 2001)	Sharon O'Neill	4:12
6.	"Melting Pot" (by When the Cat's Away) (non-album single, 1988)	Roger Cook; Roger Greenaway	3:44
7.	"For Today" (by Netherworld Dancing Toys) (from Painted Years, 1985)	Malcolm Black; Nick Sampson	5:15
8.	"Keeping Up the Love Thing" (by The Katene Sisters) (non-album single, 1993)	Crummer; Griffin	3:27
9.	"You Oughta Be in Love" (from Language)	Dave Dobbyn	5:18
10.	"Love Not War" (previously unreleased)	Griffin; Tom Snow	4:04
11.	"Surrender" (from Language)	Keith Reid; Maggie Ryder	5:50
12.	"Seven Waters" (from Language)		4:39
13.	"Make Up" (from Language)	Mahinārangi Tocker	3:25
14.	"Guilty" (from Language)	Dobbyn	5:32
15.	"Once Or Twice" (non-album single, 1981)	Carol Anderson; Rob Parsons	3:05
16.	"I Hope I Never" (by ENZSO) (from ENZSO, 1996)	Tim Finn	5:34
17.	"Let It Shine (Christmas For The Children)" (non-album single, 1993)	Murray Grindlay; Murray McNabb; Simon Shattky	3:57

== Charts ==
Chart (2002)	Peak position
New Zealand Albums (RMNZ)	25
