= Pacific Media Network =

- New Zealand
- Broadcast area: New Zealand

Programming
- Format: Pacific broadcasting

History
- First air date: 2002; 24 years ago

Links
- Website: website

The Pacific Media Network is a New Zealand radio network and pan-Pasifika national broadcasting network, currently owned and operated by the National Pacific Radio Trust and partly funded by the Government. It includes the PMN 531 radio network, PMN News and Auckland-only broadcast station Niu FM combined are accessible to an estimated 92 percent of the country's Pacific population. The network targets both first-generation Pacific migrants and New Zealand-born people with Pacific heritage. As of 2009, it was the only specifically pan-Pacific broadcaster in New Zealand.

The National Pacific Radio Trust receives a $3.9 million annual grant from the Government, managed by NZ On Air and overseen by the Ministry for Culture and Heritage. It broadcasts in English, Cook Islands Māori, Niuean, Tongan, Samoan, Tuvaluan, Kiribati Gilbertese, Fijian, Solomon Islands Pijin and Tokelauan — 11 of the 40 languages NZ On Air supports. This is supplemented by commercial income which is another $800k per annum.

Since August 2017, the Trust is chaired by Tiumalu Peter Fa'afiu. Patrick Lino was the CEO from July 2017 to June 2019. Don Mann was appointed CEO on 1 July 2020.

== History ==
=== 1993–2002 ===
Radio 531pi was set up by the Auckland Pacific Island Community Radio Trust (APICRT) in Ōtāhuhu in 1993 as a station for Auckland's Pacific Island community. According to Massey University sociologist Paul Spoonley the station reached Pacific communities who were not served by commercial radio, and helped establish a pan-Pacific identity. The station initially sustained on $1.25 million of Government funding each year with limited staff salaries, but by the 2001–02 and 2002-03 financial years it was earning more than $1 million a year in advertising income.

The trust's directors during this time included Samoan businessman Arthur Anae, Tongan AUT University lecturer James Prescott and former Federated Farmers president Brian Chamberlin. Tuaratini, a Radio 531pi announcer during its early years, said her role was to continue the oral traditions of Pacific culture. Faaolo Utumapu, the first totally blind student to gain a Bachelor of Communication Studies at AUT University, became a Radio 531pi host in 2000.

=== 2002–2003 ===
In early 2002, the APICRT secured a Government contract to operate nationwide network Niu FM over three years, using a similar operational model to Radio 531pi. The network was a three-year pilot with $8 million of funding from NZ On Air. It was intended to complement the existing services offered by Radio 531pi, Capital Samoa Radio and the Access Radio Network, but target a younger New Zealand-born Pacific demographic. Sina Wendt-Moore was the network's first chief executive. The Government also set up the National Pacific Radio Trust (NPRT) to oversee the Niu FM project, and ensure it reflected the diversity of Pacific peoples and communities and shaped New Zealand's national identity, by broadcasting and producing programmes in English, Samoan, Tongan, Cook Islands Māori, Niuean, Tokelauan, Tuvaluan and Fijian languages.

On 31 August 2002, the new Niu FM network went to air in Auckland, Wellington and Christchurch, broadcasting programmes from the Radio 531pi building. By October 2002 the NRPT had threatened to cancel the APICRT's contract, accusing the trust of mismanagement. It pursued the matter through mediation and then through court action. The network continued to operate normally through this process, but journalist Tapu Misa says she and other staff provided unpaid services. Vienna Richards was interim news editor and hosted the 2002 election special.

=== 2003–2007 ===
On 3 June 2003, the NRPT took over the Niu FM network, moving the operations from Otahuhu to new studios in the central Auckland suburb of Ponsonby. In an interview with Metro Magazine, NRPT chairman Simativa Perese accused the APICRT of inadequately covering issues like tithing in churches, inappropriately using funds on company cars and staff meals, and having a conflict of interest between its Niu FM and Radio 531pi networks. In an article in the Pacific Journalism Review, journalist Tapu Misa, the wife of interim Niu FM manager Sefita Hao’uli, rejected the allegations. She said the network had covered the issue of tithing extensively, its spending on staff benefits and client events was in line with industry standards, and the APICRT did not want either station to undermine the other. In an interview with Radio Australia, Hao’uli also accused NRPT of excessive interference.

For the next three years Niu FM was operated by the NRPT and Radio 531pi was operated by the APICRT. Reviews of Niu FM described it as "fresh and irrelevant", with an underlying Pacific philosophy. In 2005, the Government decided to continue funding Niu FM beyond the pilot period, after a report to Cabinet showed the NPRT was achieving most of its objectives. The APICRT continued to operate Radio 531pi as normal, including providing coverage of the 2006 Samoan election. The protracted legal dispute between NRPT and APICRT was expected to last months, but lasted two years. The trusts reached a settlement, allowing the two stations to pool resources and eventually merge operations.

=== 2006–2011 ===
In 2006, the Government asked the APICRT to transfer operations of Radio 531pi to the NRPT, while retaining ownership of the 531 AM frequency. Broadcasting minister Steve Maharey said the merger would protect the future of both stations, and allow the stations to share resources and staff. However, Misa said there was still bitterness between the two stations, and NRPT chairman Fa’amatuainu Tino Pereira later said the merging process was very difficult for the staff involved. Misa said Niu FM had broadcast derogatory comments about Pacific workers and did not pronounce Pacific names correctly. The 2006 Fringe Lenders in New Zealand Desk Research Project, commissioned by the Ministry of Consumer Affairs, found high-interest "fringe lenders" were advertising on Radio 531pi and Niu FM.

In 2008, Pacific Media Network expanded its range of first language programmes simulcast on Niu FM and Radio 531pi to include shows for people from the Solomon Islands and Kiribati. In March, One News reported the Pacific Media Network had appointed Vienna Richards, the sister of William Sio from the governing Labour Party, to an unadvertised position as editor of the Pacific Radio News service. Political reporter Chris Trotter criticised the decision and urged the network to reconsider it. Richards made a complaint about the piece to the Broadcasting Standards Authority, arguing the piece was imbalanced, inaccurate and unfair, but the complaint was not upheld.

In June 2010, Radio 531pi stood down Efeso Collins, the host of the weekend current affairs show Talanoa Pacific; he said it was an attempt to stifle his discussions of alleged misspending of a $4.8 million Government grant by the Pacific Islands Economic Development Agency. The unpaid volunteers and low-paid staff who helped establish Radio 531pi were recognised at its 17th birthday in 2010. Pereira resigned as chairman during board changes at the end of 2010; the new board included former APIRCT board member Brian Chamberlain, businessman Uluomatootua Saulaulu Aiono, chartered accountant Willie Johnston and broadcaster Sandra Kailahi.

=== 2011–2016 ===
The Pacific Media Network signed a contract with Whitireia New Zealand in January 2011 to set up a studio in its Cuba Street Media Centre. The studio was opened by tertiary education minister Steven Joyce in May as a training studio for the New Zealand Radio Training School, which is rented out by Niu FM for Wellington broadcasts.

Later the same year, NZ On Air gave the NRPT a one-off $725,000 grant to move its entire operations from Ponsonby to new, larger, more modern studios in Manukau. The move took place in April 2012. Broadcasting minister Jonathan Coleman said the Ponsonby studios were outdated and the new location would bring the network closer to most Pacific communities. At the opening of the new studios, National Party colleague Sam Lotu-Iiga said the station performed an important role in broadcasting to Pacific communities in their own language and promoting the economic prosperity of Pacific people.

Radio 531pi and Niu FM took part in the APA Commercial Radio Survey in February and March 2012. Chief executive Tom Etuata died in October 2012. In 2013, Pacific trade commissioner Lafitai Iupati Fuatai appeared on Radio 531pi to publicly defend the Samoan government's SAME trade show in Mangere, after it was criticised by Radio 531pi host Tago Pili.

=== 2017– ===
August 2017 saw Ministers Maggie Barry and Alfred Ngaro appoint four new Board members for three year terms: Tiumalu Peter Fa'afiu (Chair), Sholan Ivaiti (Treasurer), Jody Jackson Becerra and Sara-Jane Elika. Martha Samasoni and Dr Lesieli MacIntyre were reappointed for two more years.

On his first day, 1 August 2017, new Chair (Tiumalu Peter Fa’afiu) approved a NZOA commissioned independent report. The recommendations of the publicly available report led to the new Board developing a new Pacific Content Strategy in December 2017. The strategy and subsequent implementation was seen by the Board as the last opportunity to deal with 17 years of operational disorganisation, lack of excellence performance and slow adaptation to audience needs particularly in the digital space.

Changes included moving the PMN 531 to the national radio network in December 2018 and focussing NiuFM on the Auckland market with its online platform having national coverage. Cost cutting allowed PMN to regroup after three years of deficits due to decrease in commercial revenue and nine years of static Government funding.

June 2019 saw PMN receive an extra $700k top up in its baseline funding to take its public funding to $3.9 per annum. There was 9 years of static funding prior to this. The new funding reflected the growing confidence by NZOA and Government in the new PMN Board direction and leadership.

June 2020 saw PMN receive another top up from Government taking its annual baseline funding to $4.5 million and another $500k in Capex funding. Off the back of significant Covid-19 communications work throughout its many platforms, PMN's commercial revenue increased significantly. The 2019/20 financial year saw PMN return to surplus following four years of deficit. It was with that confidence that the Board appointed a new CEO in experienced executive, Don Mann Jr. Second half of 2020 saw the organisation hire new talent with focus on digital, multi-media journalism, and young DJ/producing talent.

Board members (Elika, Ivaiti, Jackson-Becerra) were renewed for another term by Government. Board Chair (Fa'afiu) was convinced by ministers and officials to stay on for a few more months to ensure confidence in the continued growth of the organisation.

In 2023 PMN lost a long-time Cook Island language broadcaster with the death of Bernard Tairea.

== Main services ==
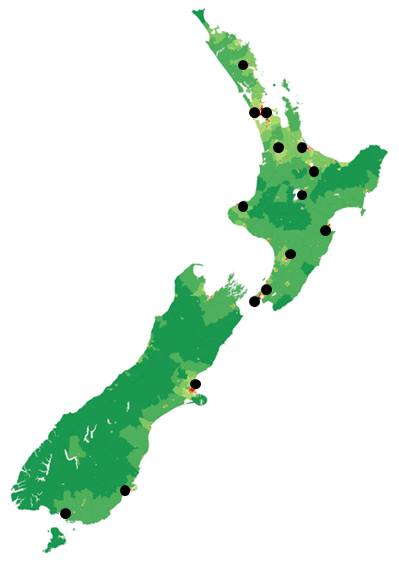
This map shows the distribution of Pacific Media Network frequencies relative to population density.

=== NIU FM ===
Niu FM is an Auckland based radio station, targeting New Zealand-born 15 to 35-year-old from a range of Pacific communities. Its name translates as "young coconut" and its tagline is "the beat of the Pacific". Niu FM's flagship show "The Morning Shack" is hosted by Regan Foa'i and Gaby Solomona. Former breakfast hosts include Oscar Knightley, Stephanie Tauevihi, Mario Gaoa, and Sela Alo. Other Niu FM shows include the popular afternoon show "The Rush" with Sia and Henry.

Niu FM broadcasts on the following frequencies:

- Auckland - 103.8 FM

=== Radio 531pi ===
Radio 531pi is a station broadcasting news, information, talkback and music. It was established as an independent Auckland radio station in 1993, and targets first and second generation Pacific migrants. Its single frequency, 531 AM, is available across Auckland and much of Northland and Waikato. Despite becoming part of the Pacific Media Network in 2007, the station continues to target a 35 plus demographic that is "informed, educated and proud of its Pacific roots".

The station's hosts have included a range of Pacific talent, from Tuaratini, Oscar Kightley, Teuila Blakely, Tofiga Fepulea'i, Maryjane Mckibbin-Schwenke, Brian Salaga and more.

531pi broadcasts on the following frequencies:

- Whangārei - 103.6 FM
- Auckland - 102.2 FM
- Hamilton - 103.4 FM
- Tauranga - 103.8 FM
- Rotorua - 103.9 FM
- Taupō - 104.0 FM
- Hawke's Bay - 103.9 FM
- Taranaki - 103.6 FM
- Manawatu - 103.4 FM
- Wellington - 103.7 FM
- Wellington - 104.1 FM
- Christchurch - 104.1 FM
- Dunedin - 103.8 FM
- Invercargill - 103.6 FM

=== Community Language Programmes ===
Pacific Media Network broadcasts ten first-language community programmes during evenings, overnights and weekends on Radio 531pi in Auckland and Niu FM outside of Auckland. Te Kura Mareva, a Cook Islands Māori show, airs on Monday night. George James Ford, a leader of Hamilton's Cook Islands community, co-hosted the programme until his death in 2014. Niue Ogo Motu, a Niuean language programme, airs on Tuesday night. Ioane Aleke Fa’avae, an educator, Auckland University health researcher and former teacher, co-hosts the show. Le'o e 'Otu Felenite, a Tongan language programme, airs on Wednesday nights. Anahila Kanongata'a Suisuiki, a Child, Youth and Family social worker, is a regular panelist on the programme.

Samoan language programme Le Foafoa o Aotearoa airs on Thursday nights; Tuvaluan language programme Te Sikugaleo Gali o Tuvalu and Kiribati Gilbertese programme Tabo Kiakia air on Friday nights; and Fijian language programme Na Domo i Viti e Aotearoa airs on Saturday nights. The Sunday schedule includes Solomon Islands Pijin programme Vois Bilong Iumi from 2pm Sunday, Tokelauan programme Te Vagana Tokelau from 4pm, and Samoan language programme Le Foafoa o Aotearoa from 8pm.

=== Pacific Radio News ===
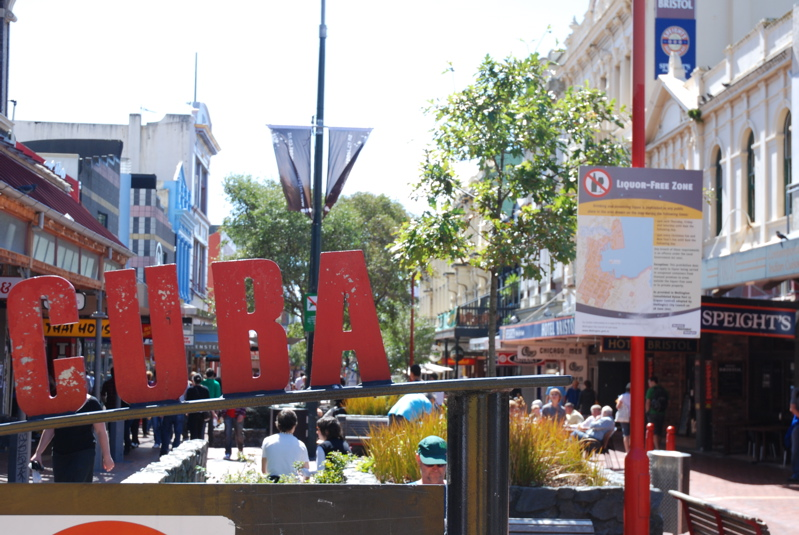
Pacific Media Network has partnered with Whitireia New Zealand on Cuba Street in Wellington.

The Pacific Radio News Service provides English language news bulletins at the top of the hour between 6am and 6pm, on both Niu FM and Radio 531pi. The bulletins cover stories affecting Pacific peoples from New Zealand, the Pacific countries and around the world, and gives Pacific perspectives of major national and international news stories that other media are reporting about. The news service produces and broadcasts 91 five-minute bulletins in English every week, with some bulletins airing only on the Niu FM station in Auckland. It also produces 41 bulletins in other languages each week, including at least three five-minute bulletins each in Samoan, Tongan, Cook Island Māori and Niuean languages, and at least one five-minute bulletin each week in Fijian, Tokelauan, Tuvalu, Solomons and Kiribati languages. Rima Cooper, Gladys Hartson-Shingles and Tagata Pasifika host Marama Papau have worked as journalists and newsreaders for the service.

Pacific Radio News provides training opportunities for Whitireia New Zealand radio and journalism students. Through its Whitereia partnership, students contribute news with a central North Island focus from Whitereia's Cuba Street media centre.

== Other services ==
=== Events and promotions ===
Pacific Media Network sponsors and organises a range of other events, including the Pasifika Festival: Niu FM drive host Sela Alo was a master of ceremonies at a Pasefika event in 2005. In 2009, Niu FM provided a $35,000 naming rights sponsorship to the Wellington Positively Pasifika Festival at Waitangi Park. In October 2012, Niu FM sponsored The Mixer 3 Concert, featuring Tomorrow People, Australian band Swiss, New Zealand reggae band Three Houses Down, Aaradhna, Pieter T, Cydel, Sweet and Irie, Giant Killa and Brownhill. In December it held a Pacific Christmas Party, also featuring Swiss and Three Houses Down.

The Pacific Radio Network sponsors two categories in the Pacific Music Awards. The Niu FM Best Pacific Artist category has been won by Tha Feelstyle for Break It To Pieces, Dei Hamo for First Edition, Cydel for Soul Finder and Memoirs of a Midnight Cowboy, Nesian Mystik for Elevator Musiq, Savage for Savage Island, Ladi6 for The Liberation Of..., Adeaze for Rise & Shine, Aaradhna for Treble & Reverb, and David Dallas for Runnin'. The Radio 531pi Best Pacific Group category has been won by Adeaze for Always and for Real and Rise & Shine, Spacifix for Much Love, Te Vaka for Olatia and Haoloto, Nesian Mystik for Elevator Musiq and 99AD, Tomorrow People for One, Sol3 Mio for Sol3 Mio, and Cydel for Memoirs of a Midnight Cowboy.

=== Merchandise ===
In 2011, EMI released the Niu FM presents Jam PAC'd, a compilation album compiled by breakfast host Sela Alo. It featured TDub, Ten Six, Vince Harder, Melanie Smith, Sammy G., Young Sid, Savage, Jarrell Houston, Devolo, Scribe, Erakah, DJCXL, Akaria, Trey Smoov, DJ Raw, Pieter T., K. One, D-Witty, Brysen G., Ria, Kolohe Kai, Adeaze, Uptown Swuite, Tomorrow People, Tuita Boyz, Three Houses Down, K. & Nela Music and Just in Wellington.

=== Social and language campaigns ===
The Pacific Media Network took part in a week-long campaign with unions and Government agencies in 2008 to promote health and safety for Pacific workers in Manukau. The campaign included interviews and talkback segments on health and safety broadcast in a range of Pacific languages. Niu FM broadcast a rap by Angell, produced by Dawn Raid Entertainment and commissioned by the Department of Labour, to educate secondary school students about workers' rights. Radio 531pi and Niu FM broadcast health messages and segments through a partnership with Health Star Pacific. Pasefika Proud, a campaign aimed at addressing domestic violence in Pacific communities, is supported by the Pacific Media Network and the Ministry of Social Development.

The Network makes special broadcasts during Pacific language weeks. During the 2012 Niuean Language Week Radio 531pi broadcast a live stream of the Saturday opening event, a Tuesday night talkback special, and daily "learn a phrase" segments. Linita Manu'atu, an AUT University Pasifika Education lecturer, is a regular host of Tongan Language Week programmes.
