= Sunshine (Alphrisk song) =

Single by Alphrisk featuring Adeaze

from the album The Best Kept Secret
- Released: 2004
- Genre: hip hop
- Label: Dawn Raid Entertainment

Alphrisk featuring Adeaze singles chronology
"Hook Up" (2004)	"Sunshine" (2004)

"Sunshine" is a single by Alphrisk, formerly of the Deceptikonz, and featuring Adeaze. It was first released in 2004 on the album The Best Kept Secret.

"Sunshine" entered the New Zealand music charts as a single in February 2005, and remained on the charts for 9 weeks, peaking at 8.

== Track listing ==
1. "Sunshine" (Radio Edit)
2. "Sunshine" (Instrumental)
3. "Sunshine" (A Cappella)
