= White Sunday (album) =

Studio album by Mareko
- Released: 2003
- Genre: Hip hop
- Length: 2:13:31
- Label: Dawn Raid
- Producer: Celph Titled; Cochise; Da Beatminerz; DJ Shan; Emile; E-Swift; Ghetto Professionals; John Chong-Nee; P-Money; Scram Jones; The Beat Digglerz; The Beatnuts

Mareko chronology
White Sunday (2003)	White Sunday 2: The Book of Mark (2008)

Singles from White Sunday
- 1. "Mareko (Here to Stay)" Released: 2003; 2. "Stop Drop & Roll" Released: 2003; 3. "Street Rap" Released: 2003

Professional ratings
Review scores
Source	Rating
The New Zealand Herald	3/5 stars

White Sunday is the debut solo studio album by New Zealand rapper Mareko. It was released in 2003 via Dawn Raid Entertainment. The album's title is a reference to a Samoan holiday that happens on the second Sunday in October.

Production was handled by the Ghetto Professionals, P-Money, Celph Titled, Cochise, Da Beatminerz, DJ Shan, Emile, E-Swift, John Chong-Nee, Scram Jones, The Beat Digglerz and The Beatnuts, with Brotha D and YDNA serving as executive produces. It features guest appearances from Celph Titled, Deceptikonz, DJ Sir-Vere, E-Swift, Inspectah Deck, J-Ro, Psycho Les, Roc Raida, Sadat X and Scram Jones. The album debuted at number 4 on the Official New Zealand Music Chart. Two of its singles, "Mareko (Here to Stay)" and "Stop Drop & Roll", also went on charted, reaching number 4 and 6, respectively, on the Official New Zealand Music Chart.

In March 2006, a double CD package was released, including a second instrumentals disc and two bonus tracks self-produced by Mareko. The album's sequel entitled White Sunday 2: The Book of Mark was released in 2008.

== Track listing ==
No.	Title	Producer(s)	Length
1.	"Espionage"	The Beat Digglerz	4:02
2.	"Oh Shit" (featuring Psycho Les)	The Beatnuts	4:19
3.	"Street Rap" (featuring Inspectah Deck)	V.I.C.	3:44
4.	"Mareko (Here to Stay)"	V.I.C.	3:55
5.	"Why Is That?"	Da Beatminerz	4:19
6.	"White Sunday Sermon"		1:52
7.	"Legacy"	John Chong-Nee	3:47
8.	"City Line"	P-Money	5:54
9.	"Big Dummy" (featuring Celph Titled)	Celph Titled	3:49
10.	"Don't Need Protection" (featuring Scram Jones and Roc Raida)	Scram Jones	4:24
11.	"Suburban Legend"	DJ Shan	3:31
12.	"Let Y'all Know" (featuring J-Ro and E-Swift)	E-Swift	3:44
13.	"This Is Me"	Emile	3:18
14.	"My Lady"	Cochise	4:43
15.	"Major Flavour" (featuring Sadat X and DJ Sir-Vere)	Ghetto Pros.	4:12
16.	"Stop, Drop and Roll" (featuring the Deceptikonz)	P-Money	3:54
17.	"Espionage" (Instrumental)		4:05
18.	"Oh Shit" (Instrumental)		4:07
19.	"Street Rap" (Instrumental)		3:52
20.	"Mareko (Here to Stay)" (Instrumental)		4:00
21.	"Why Is That" (Instrumental)		4:22
22.	"Legacy" (Instrumental)		3:51
23.	"City Line" (Instrumental)		5:57
24.	"Big Dummy" (Instrumental)		3:51
25.	"Don't Need Protection" (Instrumental)		4:27
26.	"Suburban Legend" (Instrumental)		3:33
27.	"Let Y'all Know" (Instrumental)		3:44
28.	"This Is Me" (Instrumental)		3:23
29.	"My Lady" (Instrumental)		4:44
30.	"Major Flavour" (Instrumental)		4:15
31.	"Stop, Drop and Roll" (Instrumental)		3:55
32.	"Crunch" (featuring the Deceptikonz)	Mareko	4:00
33.	"99 Bottles"	Mareko	3:58
Total length:			2:13:31

== Charts ==
Chart (2003)	Peak position
New Zealand Albums (RMNZ)	4
