= The Best Kept Secret (Alphrisk album) =

Studio album by Alphrisk
- Released: October 2004
- Genre: Hip hop
- Label: Dawn Raid Entertainment; Clientele Records

Alphrisk chronology
| Elimination (2002) | The Best Kept Secret (2004) |

Professional ratings
Review scores
| Source | Rating |
|---|---|
| Amplifier New Zealand | (favourable) |

The Best Kept Secret is the debut solo album of New Zealand hip-hop artist, Alphrisk, of the Deceptikonz released in 2004. It contained the single Sunshine, which peaked in the New Zealand Singles Chart at number 8.

== Track listing ==
1. "Fifteen Islands"
2. "Guess Who's Here"
3. "Capital SA" featuring Savage
4. "Move Forward"
5. "Sunshine" featuring Adeaze
6. "I Think I Found Her"
7. "The A-Men"
8. "Fo’ Sho’" featuring Scram Jones and Mareko
9. "Hands Up"
10. "My People" featuring Mareko
11. "The Circus" featuring Deceptikonz and Breakinwreckwordz
12. "The Best Kept Secret"
