= I Love You (Aaradhna album) =

Studio album by Aaradhna
- Released: May 8, 2006
- Genre: R&B
- Length: 46:47
- Label: Dawn Raid

Aaradhna chronology
I Love You (2006)	Sweet Soul Music (2008)

Singles from I Love You
- 1. "Down Time" Released: January 23, 2006; 2. "I Love You Too" Released: September 4, 2006; 3. "Shake (Remix)" Released: September 7, 2006

I Love You is the debut studio album by New Zealand musical recording artist Aaradhna released on May 8, 2006. The first single "Down Time", entered the New Zealand RIANZ Singles Chart at #4 on January 23, 2006, and peaked at #3. The third single "I Love You Too", peaked at #5.

== Track listing ==
Track listing and song credits adapted from ASCAP and Spotify.

No.	Title	Writer(s)	Length
1.	"Faith"	Aaradhna Patel; Nathan Holmes; Danny Leaosavai'i	3:55
2.	"I Love You Too"	Patel; Holmes; Leaosavai'i	3:31
3.	"I'm Never"	Patel; Holmes; Leaosavai'i	3:45
4.	"Down Time"	Patel; Holmes; Leaosavai'i; Logovi'i Tupa'i	3:34
5.	"Please Say You Do"	Patel; Leaosavai'i; Vasily Zolotarev	3:21
6.	"Shake"	Patel; Holmes; Leaosavai'i	3:31
7.	"Knowing You"		3:40
8.	"I Love You"	Patel	3:28
9.	"Why"	Patel; Holmes	3:51
10.	"Diggin' Your Love"	Patel; Ernest Franklin	3:35
11.	"Secret Lover"	Patel; Aaron Ngawhika	3:12
12.	"I'm a Fighter"	Patel; Holmes; Leaosavai'i	3:51
13.	"Shake (Remix)" (feat. Mareko)	Patel; Holmes; Leaosavai'i	3:28
Total length:			46:47

== Charts ==
Chart (2006)	Peak position
New Zealand Albums (RMNZ)	13
