= I Do Believe (Tha Feelstyle song) =

"I Do Believe (Tha Remix)"

Single by Tha Feelstyle

from the album Sione's Wedding (soundtrack)
- Released: January 2006
- Recorded: 2006
- Genre: hip hop
- Label: Dawn Raid Entertainment

"I Do Believe (Tha Remix)" is a single by New Zealand hip-hop artist Tha Feelstyle, released in 2006. It was created as the title song for the movie Sione's Wedding, and features Mareko, Flowz, Manuel Bundy & Lapi Mariner.

The song spent 8 weeks on the New Zealand music charts, peaking at 17.

== Track listings ==
1. I Do Believe (Tha Remix) (Radio Edit)
2. Suga ea!
3. I Do Believe (Tha Remix) (Instrumental)
