= Sweet Soul Music (Aaradhna album) =

Studio album by Aaradhna
- Released: February 14, 2008
- Recorded: 2007
- Genre: R&B
- Label: Dawn Raid Entertainment

Aaradhna chronology
I Love You (2006)	Sweet Soul Music (2008)	Treble & Reverb (2012)

Sweet Soul Music is the second studio album by New Zealand musical recording artist Aaradhna, released in 2008 on Valentine's Day.

== Track listing ==
1. "Didn't I (Blow Your Mind This Time)"
2. "I Want You Back"
3. "Betcha By Golly Wow"
4. "You Are the Sunshine of My Life"
5. "I Wish It Would Rain"
6. "Bring It On Home to Me"
7. "Ain't Nothing Like the Real Thing" (featuring Adeaze)
8. "Let's Get It On"
9. "Let's Stay Together"
10. "Natural Woman"
11. "Ain't Too Proud to Beg"
12. "Heatwave"
13. "Just My Imagination (Running Away with Me)"
14. "Warrior"

== Charts ==
Chart (2008)	Peak position
New Zealand Albums (RMNZ)	17
