= Message to My Girl =

1984 song by Split Enz

Single by Split Enz

from the album Conflicting Emotions
- B-side: "Kia Kaha (Ever Be Strong)"
- Released: January 1984
- Recorded: 1983
- Genre: New wave · rock
- Length: 4:01
- Label: Mushroom Records
- Songwriter: Neil Finn

Split Enz singles chronology
"Strait Old Line" (1983)	"Message to My Girl" (1984)	"I Wake Up Every Night" (1984)

Music video
- "Message to My Girl" on YouTube

"Message to My Girl" is a song by New Zealand art rock group Split Enz. It was released in January 1984 as the second single from their album Conflicting Emotions.

In 2001, the song was voted by members of APRA as the 36th best New Zealand song of the 20th century.

During the 2006 Split Enz tour, Neil Finn dedicated the song to his wife Sharon.

== Track listing ==
1. "Message to My Girl" – 4:01
2. "Kia Kaha (Ever Be Strong)" – 3:35

== Personnel ==
- Neil Finn – vocals, piano, guitar
- Noel Crombie – vocals, percussion
- Nigel Griggs – vocals, bass
- Eddie Rayner – keyboards
- Ricky Fataar – drums

== Charts ==
=== Weekly charts ===
Chart (1984)	Peak position
Australia (Kent Music Report)	12
Netherlands (Dutch Top 40)	13
New Zealand (Recorded Music NZ)	28

=== Year-end charts ===
Chart (1984)	Peak position
Australia (Kent Music Report)	91

== Certifications ==
Region	Certification	Certified units/sales
New Zealand (RMNZ)	Platinum	30,000^{‡}
^{‡} Sales+streaming figures based on certification alone.

== ENZSO version ==
"Message to My Girl"

Single by ENZSO

from the album ENZSO
- Released: 1995
- Genre: Pop rock
- Label: Sony/Epic
- Songwriter: Neil Finn
- Producers: Dave Woodcock; Eddie Rayner

ENZSO singles chronology
"Poor Boy" (1995)	"Message to My Girl" (1995)

When Split Enz member Eddie Rayner collaborated with the New Zealand Symphony Orchestra for the project ENZSO in 1995, they made a song cover and Finn once again provided the lead vocals. The re-recording was converted into more of a ballad version than the original.

=== Track listing ===
1. "Message to My Girl" - Performed by Neil Finn
2. "Stranger Than Fiction" - Performed by Tim Finn, Neil Finn and Sam Hunt
3. "Time for a Change" - Performed by Tim Finn

=== Charts ===
Chart (1996)	Peak position
Australia (ARIA Charts)	56
