= Down Time =

2006 single by Aaradhna

Single by Aaradhna

from the album I Love You
- Released: 9 January 2006
- Length: 3:35
- Label: Dawn Raid; Universal Music New Zealand
- Songwriters: Holmes; Leaosavaii; Patel; Tupa'i
- Producers: Brotha D; Nate D

Aaradhna singles chronology
"Love Declaration" (2005)	"Down Time" (2006)	"Shake" (2006)

"Down Time" is a song by New Zealand R&B singer Aaradhna, released as her debut solo single in 2006. It entered the New Zealand Singles Chart at number four on 23 January 2006 and peaked at number three. It finished 2006 as New Zealand's 13th-most successful single and was certified double platinum by Recorded Music NZ for sales and streaming figures exceeding 60,000 units.

== Charts ==
=== Weekly charts ===
Chart (2006)	Peak position
New Zealand (Recorded Music NZ)	3

=== Year-end charts ===
Chart (2006)	Position
New Zealand (RIANZ)	13

== Certifications ==
Region	Certification	Certified units/sales
New Zealand (RMNZ)	2× Platinum	60,000^{‡}
^{‡} Sales+streaming figures based on certification alone.
