= For Today (Netherworld Dancing Toys song) =

Single by Netherworld Dancing Toys

from the album Painted Years
- B-side: "Old Friends"
- Released: 1985
- Studio: Marmalade (Wellington)
- Genre: Pop
- Length: 5:12; 4:00 (single edit)
- Label: Virgin
- Songwriter(s): Malcolm Black; Nick Sampson
- Producer(s): Nigel Stone

Netherworld Dancing Toys singles chronology
"The Real You" (1984)	"For Today" (1985)	"Soul Searching" (1985)

"For Today" is a song by the New Zealand band Netherworld Dancing Toys, released through Virgin Records in 1985 as the lead single from their debut studio album Painted Years. It reached No. 3 in the Official New Zealand Music Chart, won Single of the Year at the New Zealand Music Awards, and has since become regarded as a "Kiwi classic."

== Background and development ==
The majority of "For Today" was written by band member Nick Sampson while he was living with his grandmother in Waitara in late 1984 and early 1985, working an annual summer job at a freezing works. Fellow band member Malcolm Black rewrote a verse after Sampson presented his composition to the rest of the Netherworld Dancing Toys. As with the rest of Painted Years, the song was produced by Nigel Stone and recorded at Marmalade Studios in Wellington.

The guest vocals of Annie Crummer became a particularly well-known part of the track and made the then 19-year-old a New Zealand household name. The singer has since commented on the unexpected power of her vocal performance, saying "something just erupted in [her]" and that she "just opened [her] mouth and this demon came out." Brass duo The Newton Hoons (consisting of saxophonist Chris Green and trumpeter Mike Russell) and backing vocalist Kim Willoughby (who would later perform with Crummer in When the Cat's Away) also feature on the track. Willoughby and Crummer are furthermore present in the song's music video, set in a recording studio and on a Cook Strait ferry, alongside the Netherworld Dancing Toys.

== Track listing ==
7-inch single

- "For Today" (edit) – 4:00
- "Old Friends" – 4:10

12-inch single

- "For Today" – 5:12
- "Old Friends" – 4:10
- "For Today" (edit) – 4:00

== Charts ==
=== Weekly charts ===
Chart (1985)	Peak position
New Zealand (Recorded Music NZ)	3

=== Year-end charts ===
Chart (1985)	Position
New Zealand (Recorded Music NZ)	32
