= Hook-up =

Hook-up has several meanings:

- Making a connection between components in a system
  - An electrical connector
  - A connection to water, sewer, or electrical utilities at a campsite
- Meet up, or making a connection between people
  - Slang term for courtship, especially of short duration
  - A one-night stand
  - Casual relationship or casual sex
  - Hookup culture
- In urban slang, a discount
- In urban slang, a drug dealer

== Arts and entertainment ==
- Hooking Up, a collection of essays and short stories by American author Tom Wolfe
- "Hook Up", song by Dawn Raid All-Stars 2004
- Hooking Up (film), a 2020 American comedy-drama film starring Brittany Snow and Sam Richardson

== Other ==
- Hook-Ups, an American skateboard brand
