= Southside Story 2: International =

Studio album by Various artists
- Released: June 2001
- Recorded: Various times
- Genre: Pop
- Length: ?
- Label: Dawn Raid Entertainment

Various artists chronology
Southside Story (2000)	Southside Story 2: International (2001)

Southside Story 2: International is a New Zealand compilation album released by Dawn Raid Entertainment in 2001.

== History ==
Southside Story 2: International was released in June 2001 through Dawn Raid Entertainment as well as King Distribution. Since the release of the first compilation in 2000, Dawn Raid had expanded into a clothing business, opened a streetwear store and a barbershop.

Around this time the founders of Dawn Raid Entertainment Brotha D & Y.D.N.A had begun taking trips overseas to America to investigate the music scene, it was in this environment that the new album was created. With connections made in LA and N.Y, Dawn Raid licensed tracks from Jymini, hooked in Canadian star Kardinal Offishall, and spent a lot of time establishing the services of underground New York artists such as Ghetto Rustlaz, Prince Domonique and Harlem's own B.A.G.S. The compilation also included musicians from New Zealand.

The Deceptikonz debuted their lyrical frenzy on "Elimination" and "Beware", which ended up getting them voted for the best new group at the bFM Awards 2001.

== Track listing ==
1. Intro - Brotha D
2. Elimination - Deceptikonz
3. Where We're Goin - Ghetto Rustlaz
4. Girlz Pimp 2 - Jymini
5. 2000 Beyond - K.A.O.S
6. Unstoppable - Ill Semantics
7. I Know - Lyrical Lord
8. Connect - DJ Sirvere featuring Mareko and Scribe
9. MIC T.H.U.G.S - Kardinal Offishall
10. Bang Bang - Jymini
11. Southside Souljahz - 275
12. Runnin Thangs - K.A.O.S
13. Who Run This - B.A.G.S
14. Verbal Assault - Ill Semantics
15. Beware - Deceptikonz
16. Game Of Death - Prince Domonique
