= Poor Boy (Split Enz song) =

Song written by Tim Finn

Single by Split Enz

from the album True Colours
- B-side: "Missing Person (Live)"
- Released: 1980
- Recorded: Melbourne, 1979
- Genre: New wave
- Length: 3:28
- Label: Mushroom Records
- Songwriter: Tim Finn
- Producer: David Tickle

Split Enz singles chronology
"What's the Matter with You" (1980)	"Poor Boy" (1980)	"One Step Ahead" (1980)

"Poor Boy" is a song written by Tim Finn and recorded by Split Enz for their 1980 True Colours album. It was released as a single in the UK only.

== The song ==
The lyrics concerned a young man who had fallen in love with a girl on another planet, who he had only discovered existed when tuning his radio, and his regret that they will never meet face to face. The song made use of an ethereal keyboard solo by Eddie Rayner.

== Reception ==
Bernard Zuel said "Poor Boy" was "ostensibly a straight pop song but one that can't hide its oddness."

== In popular culture ==
In 2009 a Melbourne Theatre Company production of the same name redeveloped the song's themes, with the other-worldly character presented as the ghost of a car accident.

== Track listing ==
Released in the United Kingdom only.

1. "Poor Boy" 3:28
2. "Missing Person (Live)" 3:39

== Personnel ==
- Tim Finn - vocals
- Neil Finn - vocals, guitar
- Noel Crombie - percussion
- Malcolm Green - drums
- Nigel Griggs - bass
- Eddie Rayner - vocals, keyboards

== ENZSO version ==
"Poor Boy"

Single by Enzso

from the album Enzso
- Released: 1995
- Label: Sony/Epic
- Producers: Dave Woodcock; Eddie Rayner

Enzso singles chronology
"Poor Boy" (1995)	"'Message to My Girl'" (1995)

Dave Dobbyn singles chronology
"Naked Flame" (1995)	"Poor Boy" (1995)	"Beside You" (1997)

"Poor Boy" is a song by Enzso, released as the first single from their album Enzso. With the B-sides "I See Red", which is available on the album, and "Albert of India".

=== Track listing ===
1. "Poor Boy" - Dave Dobbyn
2. "I See Red" - Tim Finn
3. "Albert of India" - Eddie Rayner
