= For Today (disambiguation) =

For Today is an American Christian metalcore band.

For Today may also refer to:

- "For Today" (song), by Ayaka
- "For Today" (Netherworld Dancing Toys song)
