= Deceptikonz =

New Zealand hip hop group

- Origin: Auckland, New Zealand
- Genre: Hip hop
- Years active: 1996–present
- Label: Dawn Raid Entertainment
- Members: Mareko; Savage; Devolo; Alphrisk

The Deceptikonz are a New Zealand hip hop group formed in the South Auckland suburb of Manurewa in 1996 which consists of Savage, Devolo, Alphrisk and Mareko. Their debut album was Elimination released in 2002.

== History ==
The group's debut was on the underground album of 2001 Southside Story 2: International, with the tracks "Elimination" and "Beware". At the 2001 95bFM Music Awards, the album was nominated for best hip hop album of the year, and the Deceptikonz were nominated for Best New Group despite not having officially released a single.

Band member Mareko was subsequently crowned Best MC in New Zealand after winning the National Battle for Supremacy contest.

The Deceptikonz debut release was initially slated as the 6-track EP Verbal Abuse, but a decision was made to upgrade the EP to the full-length (13-track) album, Elimination.

The production team for Elimination included DJ P-Money and John Chong-Nee of gold-selling group AKA Brown.

The first single, "Fallen Angels", featuring DJ P-Money was followed by "More Than Meets the Eye" (much like their own name, a take on the Transformers motto). "Fallen Angels" features members of the Auckland City Choir, while "More Than Meets the Eye" is more funk-oriented.

"Broken Home", a solo song by group member Savage is about his biological father and shows a raw, personal side.

Member Alphrisk released his debut solo album The Best Kept Secret in 2004. Mareko released his debut solo album White Sunday in 2003, Savage released his debut solo album Moonshine in 2005, and Devolo released his debut solo album Heaven & Hell in 2008.

== Discography ==
=== Albums ===
Year	Title	Details	Peak chart positions
Year	Title	Details	NZ
2002	Elimination	Label: Dawn Raid Entertainment; Catalogue: 99122	4
2006	Heavy Rotation	Label: Dawn Raid Entertainment; Catalogue: 99773, DRECD009	—
2010	Evolution: Past, Present, Beyond	Label: Dawn Raid Entertainment; Catalogue: DRCD018	26
2022	In Perpetuity	Label: Savage Entertainment	—
"—" denotes a recording that did not chart or was not released in that territory.

=== Singles ===
Year	Title	Peak chart positions	Album
Year	Title	NZ	Album
2001	"Fallen Angels" feat. P-Money	—	Elimination
2002	"More Than Meets the Eye"	—	Elimination
2002	"Broken Home"	—	Elimination
2002	"U Want Beef"	—	Elimination
2003	"Stop, Drop and Roll" (as Mareko feat. the Deceptikonz)	6	White Sunday
2004	"Hook Up" (as the Dawn Raid All-Stars)	9	Non-album single
2006	"Don't Front on Me"	—	Heavy Rotation
2015	"Blood in Blood Out" feat. David Dallas	—	Non-album single
2022	"One Time"	15	In Perpetuity
2022	"Verbal Abuse 2.0" feat. R.E.S. & SWIDT	—	In Perpetuity
"—" denotes a recording that did not chart or was not released in that territory.
