= Sandra Kailahi =

New Zealand journalist, author, playwright and film producer

Sandra Maria Kailahi is a New Zealand journalist, author, playwright and film producer.

== Biography ==
Kailahi was selected for the 2005 Pasifika Playwright Development Forum run by Playmarket and Auckland City Council, and also took part in Playmarket's Playwright Studio in 2007 where she was mentored by Fiona Samuel.

Kailahi has a Master of International Communication from Unitec Institute of Technology. Her thesis, Tongan women talking about their lives in leadership in New Zealand : a participatory visual methodological approach to talanoa, gender and culture, was published in 2017.

In broadcasting Kailahi was part of the formation of Radio 531 PI, a semi-commercial Pacifika radio station in Auckland and she has worked for Radio New Zealand. She has worked in television with Tagata Pasifika as a reporter for 11 years, Fair Go for three years and also TVNZ 7, Te Karere and One News. Kailahi is of Tongan and Pākehā German descent. She was groundbreaking learning reporting at a time when there were no Pasifika reporters on mainstream television and limited stories of Pasifika communities.

Kailahi's other work roles have included strategic communications manager at the Alliance Community Initiatives Trust.

=== Selected creative work ===
Kailahi published a book in 2007 with Eimi Tamua called Pasifika Women: Our Stories in New Zealand (2007), interviews with 20 women. Kailahi's first play On a Different Shelf was presented at the Herald Theatre in the Aotea Centre in 2008. It was produced by the Stamp programme at The Edge, directed by Katrina Chandra and performed by Christina Bristow, Fiona Collins, Cherie James and Jenni Heka.

Kailahi created a screen production company Kingston Productions and their first short film that she produced was in 2018 called The Messiah written by Vela Manusaute. Her first feature documentary was in 2019, For My Father's Kingdom which premiered at the Berlin Film Festival. It screened in New Zealand at the New Zealand International Film Festival, and has themes of mental wellbeing, resiliency, faith, love and fatherhood in a Tongan community and features Saia Mafile'o and his children.

Meet Munch Jr. is a Loading Docs short documentary directed by Ali Cowley and produced by Kailahi about an autistic teenager who creates a cartoon character puppet. In 2020 Coconet aired her six-part web series Brutal Lives which was the first Tongan drama series produced. In 2023 Kailahi produced the film Uproar.

== Boards ==
In the film and broadcasting sector roles on boards Kailahi has held include as trustee of the National Pacific Radio Trust, trustee of the Pacific Islands Film & Television board (PIFT) and in 2019 Carmel Sepuloni as the New Zealand Associate Minister for Arts, Culture and Heritage appointed Kailahi to the board of the New Zealand Film Commission.

In the museum sector Kailai has been the chair of the Pacific Advisory Group at Auckland War Memorial Museum and a member of the Auckland Museum Trust Board.

Kailahi was part of the Strong Public Media Business Case Governance Board formed in 2021 by the government to investigate the possible merger of Radio New Zealand and TVNZ into a new public media entity. Other members included Glen Scanlon, Michael Anderson, Bailey Mackey, William Earl, John Quirk and Trisha Dunleavy.

== Awards ==
- The New Zealand Suffrage Centennial Medal 1993
- Nominated for Best Pasifika Programme: for Brutal Lives – Mo'ui Faingata'a, 2021 New Zealand Television Awards
