= Enzso (album) =

ENZSO

Studio album by Enzso
- Released: 5 November 1996
- Recorded: 1996
- Genre: Orchestral
- Length: 73:01
- Label: Sony/Epic
- Producer: Dave Woodcock, Eddie Rayner

Enzso chronology
ENZSO (1996)	ENZSO 2 (1999)

Professional ratings
Review scores
Source	Rating
Allmusic	3/5 stars

ENZSO is the debut album by the ENZSO project led by Eddie Rayner. The orchestral recording sessions were held at Symphony House in Wellington and National Radio Studios for the New Zealand Youth Choir.

== Track listing ==
1. "Poor Boy" performed by Dave Dobbyn
2. "Message to My Girl" performed by Neil Finn
3. "I Hope I Never" performed by Annie Crummer
4. "Straight Old Line" performed by Neil Finn
5. "Stuff and Nonsense" performed by Neil Finn
6. "Albert of India" performed by Eddie Rayner
7. "My Mistake" performed by Dave Dobbyn
8. "Voices" performed by Neil Finn
9. "I See Red" performed by Tim Finn
10. "Under the Wheel" performed by Sam Hunt
11. "Dirty Creature" performed by Tim Finn
12. "Stranger Than Fiction" performed by Tim Finn, Neil Finn, Sam Hunt + "Time for a Change" performed by Tim Finn

== Notes ==
- Some versions have a slightly different track listing. 13 tracks are listed, but "Stranger Than Fiction" and "Time for a Change" are joined together as one long track, making for a total of 12.
- "Albert of India" (Instrumental) is performed by Eddie Rayner, it is also included in the ENZSO "Poor Boy" Single CD.
- "I Hope I Never" is also included in Annie Crummer's compilation album, Shine: The Best of Annie Crummer (2002)

== Charts ==
=== Weekly charts ===
Weekly chart performance for ENZSO
Chart (1996/97)	Peak position
Australian Albums (ARIA)	4
New Zealand Albums (RMNZ)	2

=== Year-end charts ===
Year-end chart performance for ENZSO
Chart (1996)	Position
Australia (ARIA) Albums Chart	33
New Zealand (RIANZ)	7

== Certifications and sales ==
Region	Certification	Certified units/sales
Australia (ARIA)	Platinum	70,000^{^}
New Zealand (RMNZ)	Platinum	15,000^{^}
^{^} Shipments figures based on certification alone.
