= Mareko (Here to Stay) =

Single by Mareko
- Released: August 2003
- Recorded: 2003
- Genre: hip hop
- Label: Dawn Raid Entertainment
- Songwriter(s): Joell Ortiz; Victor Padilla; Mark Sagapolutele

Mareko singles chronology
"Mareko (Here to Stay)" (2003)	"Stop, Drop and Roll" (2003)

"Mareko (Here to Stay)" is the debut single by New Zealand hip hop artist Mareko released in 2003. The song reached No. 4 in New Zealand.

== Song information ==
Mareko is the Samoan word for Mark.

== Track listing ==
1. "Mareko (Here to Stay)"
2. "Mareko (Here to Stay) (Instrumental)"
3. "Stop, Drop & Roll" (featuring Deceptikonz)
4. "Stop, Drop & Roll (Instrumental)"

== Charts ==
=== Year-end charts ===
Chart (2003)	Position
New Zealand (Recorded Music NZ)	41
