= SWIDT =

Hip-hop collective, Onehunga, New Zealand (debut 2017)

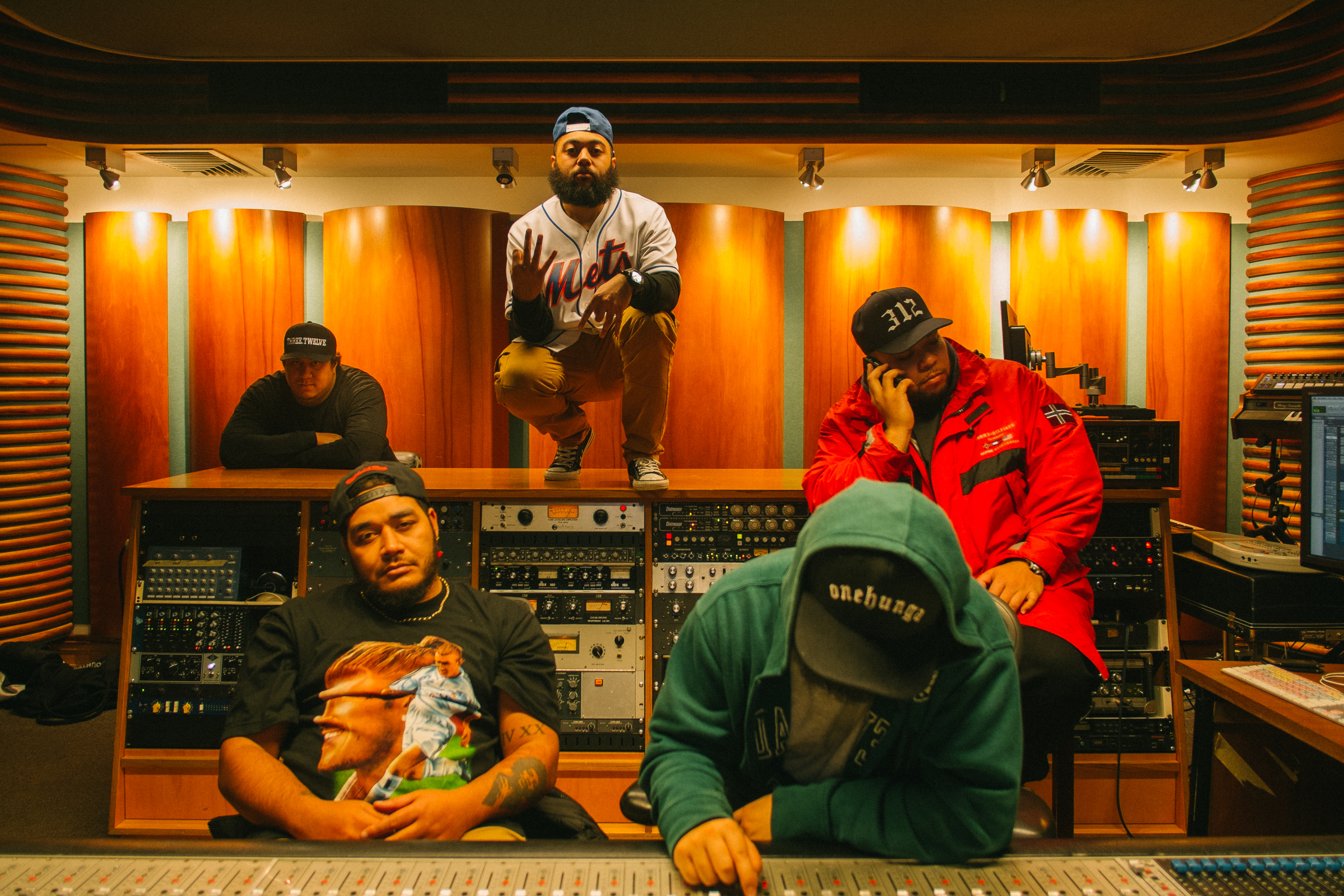
- SWIDT working on their debut album Stoneyhunga at Roundhead Studios

Background information
- Origin: Onehunga, New Zealand
- Genre: hip hop
- Years active: 2016–present
- Label: Universal Music New Zealand
- Members: Boomer; INF; Jamal; SmokeyGotBeatz; SPYCC
- Past members: A.Z.A
- Website: swidt.co.nz

SWIDT (/ˈswɪdɪt/ SWID-it); See What I Did There?) are a hip-hop collective from Onehunga, New Zealand. SmokeyGotBeatz debut project SWIDT vs Everybody was listed as No.16 in The New Zealand Herald's 20 Best Albums of 2016. They released their official debut album STONEYHUNGA, dedicated to their home suburb of Onehunga, in July 2017. Members of the collective include SPYCC, SMOKE, INF, Boomer Tha God and JAMAL.

SWIDT were nominated for both the Critics Choice Award, and Best Urban/Hip-Hop Album at the 2016 New Zealand Music Awards. At the Awards, R&B singer Aaradhna Jayantilal Patel refused her award for Best Urban/Hip-Hop Album, claiming that the two disparate categories had been placed together for racial reasons. She gave her award to SWIDT. In her speech refusing the award, Patel described SWIDT as 'the future of hip hop'.

STONEYHUNGA reached number 4 in the New Zealand album charts. SWIDT have been nominated for 6 awards this year leading the nominations list at the 2017 New Zealand Music Awards. The Onehunga group is up for Godfrey Hirst Album of the Year, Vodafone Single of the Year, Best Group, Best Hip Hop Artist, and Vodafone People's Choice – as well as Massey University Best Producer at the Artisan Awards for band member SmokeyGotBeatz.

== Discography ==
=== Studio albums ===
Title	Album details	Peak chart positions
Title	Album details	NZ
Stoneyhunga	Released: 18 November 2016; Label: SWIDT, Universal Music New Zealand; Format: CD, digital download, streaming	4

=== Extended plays ===
Title	Album details	Peak chart positions
Title	Album details	NZ
Stoneyhunga: The Bootleg EP	Released: 9 February 2018; Label: SWIDT, Universal; Format: Digital download, streaming	31
The Most Electrifying	Released: 27 July 2018; Label: SWIDT; Format: Digital download, streaming	19
Good Things Come in Threes	Released: 22 October 2020; Label: SWIDT; Format: Digital download, streaming	—
312 Day	Released: 2 December 2021; Label: SWIDT; Format: Digital download, streaming	—

=== Mixtapes ===
Title	Album details	Peak chart positions
Title	Album details	NZ
SmokeyGotBeatz Presents: Swidt vs Everybody	Released: 13 May 2016; Label: SWIDT; Format: CD, digital download, streaming	11

=== Singles ===
Title	Year	Peak chart positions		Certifications	Album
Title	Year	NZ Hot	NZ Artist	Certifications	Album
"Alfred & Church"	2017	—	—		Stoneyhunga
"Little Did She Know"	2017	—	20		Stoneyhunga
"Close One" (featuring CJ Fly)	2017	—	—		Stoneyhunga
"Tonight" (featuring Bailey Wiley)	2017	—	—		Stoneyhunga
"Player of the Day"	2017	—	—		Stoneyhunga
"Conquer"	2018	—	—		Stoneyhunga: the Bootleg EP
"Who Run It"	2018	—	—		The Most Electrifying
"Preacher Man"	2019	—	—		Non-album singles
"Who R U"	2019	—	—		Non-album singles
"Wonders" (featuring B Wise & Mikey Dam)	2020	—	—		Good Things Come in Threes
"Seize the Day" (featuring Savage)	2021	—	—		Non-album singles
"Bunga"	2021	—	—		Non-album singles
"Kelz Garage" (featuring Lomez Brown)	2021	—	5	RMNZ: Gold	312 Day
"RSVP"	2022	—	—		Non-album singles
"Youphoria" (featuring High Hoops)	2023	18	—		Non-album singles
"—" denotes a recording that did not chart.
