= Devolo (singer) =

New Zealand hip hop artist

- Genre: Hip hop
- Occupations: Singer; songwriter
- Years active: 1996–present
- Label: Dawn Raid Entertainment
- Member of: Deceptikonz
- Website: Devolo's Web Profile

David Puniani is a Tongan born, New Zealand hip hop recording artist from South Auckland, best known as a member of the hip hop group Deceptikonz. He is signed to the Dawn Raid Entertainment music label and in 2009 he was "Best Pacific Male Artist" at the Pacific Music Awards.

== Background ==
In 2008, his debut single "Somebody" became a top 10 hit on the NZ iTunes top songs for all genres and #1 on NZ iTunes top hip hop downloads. Later that year, his hit single "Too Shy" jumped from #38 to #6 in one week on New Zealand’s RIANZ Top 40 Singles Chart.

In 2009, the pop group The Pussycat Dolls asked Devolo to do a remix of their forthcoming single "Bottle Pop". In 2009 Devolo featured on David Dallas' single "Indulge Me", which charted at #34.

His debut solo album Heaven & Hell was released on 2 March 2009, but it failed to make the charts.

== Discography ==
=== Albums ===
| Date | Title | Label | Charted | Country |
|---|---|---|---|---|
| 2009 | Heaven & hell | Dawn Raid Entertainment | - | - |

=== Singles ===
| Year | Single | Album | NZ Singles Chart | Certification |
|---|---|---|---|---|
| 2008 | "Somebody" | Heaven & Hell | - | - |
| 2008 | "Too Shy" | Heaven & Hell | 6 | - |
| 2009 | "Feels Like Magic" | Non-album single | - | - |
| 2009 | "Can't Let You Go" | Heaven & Hell | - | - |
Featured
| 2009 | "Indulge Me" (with David Dallas) | Something Awesome | 34 | - |
| 2009 | "Bottle Pop" (with The Pussycat Dolls) | Doll Domination | 17 | - |
