= Netherworld Dancing Toys =

New Zealand band

- Origin: Dunedin, New Zealand
- Years active: 1982–1985
- Labels: Flying Nun Records; Virgin Records
- Past members: Malcolm Black; Nick Sampson; Graham Cockroft; Brent Alexander; Annie Crummer; Kim Willoughby; Grant Hughson

Netherworld Dancing Toys, often simply known as The NDTs, was a New Zealand band from Dunedin formed in 1982. In 1985, their single "For Today" reached number 3 in the New Zealand singles chart.

== History ==
The group formed at the University of Otago. The band members included Malcolm Black, Nick Sampson, Graham Cockroft, Brent Alexander and later Annie Crummer and Kim Willoughby. The original brass section was composed of Otago students including Alistair Perry, Matthew Trbuhovic and former chief information officer for NSW health Michael Rillstone (Mick Rillstone). The band's name is from a Roxy Music song "Spin Me Round" from their Manifesto album: "A nether world dancing toy/I'm wired for sound..." .

The band drew full houses frequently at Dunedin venues, notably the Captain Cook and Oriental Taverns, and were a popular student dance band. Musical influences were varied ranging from Dexy's Midnight Runners-styled brassy new soul, to classic Motown and ska. The band quickly developed a suite of original music which was distinctive in sound despite several brass section lineup changes.

In 1983, they played at Sweetwaters Music Festival and in 1984 they supported Blam Blam Blam on tour and a double sided LP of the concert at Mainstreet, Auckland was released.

Don McGlashan produced "The Real You"/"Standing in the Rain"/"New Zealand Love Song" which was released in November 1984.

In 1985 "For Today" reached No. 3 in the singles chart and the Netherworld Dancing Toys won five categories at the 1985 New Zealand Music Awards. Malcolm Black and Nick Sampson won the 1985 APRA Silver Scroll for "For Today".

In the early 2000s their song, "For Today" received renewed prominence when it was used as an advertisement for New Zealand Post and at one stage for a driving safety campaign, and is also included on the soundtrack of the film Sione's Wedding. In 2015 the song was used in a Pak n Save advertisement celebrating 30 years in business. For Today was released the same year as the Pak 'n Save brand was founded.

Malcolm Black became a music industry lawyer. In The Mechanics of Popular Music, A New Zealand Perspective he says of the band's demise, "We were university graduates who had a number of different options and wanted security and a regular pay packet..." Graham Cockroft is CFO of Contact Energy. Black died in Auckland on 10 May 2019.

== Discography ==
=== Albums and EPs ===
Date of Release	Title	Label	Charted	Country	Catalog Number
Albums
1983	The Trusted Ones 12"	Flying Nun Records	-	-	NDT 002
1984	The Blam Blam Blam Story/Netherworld Dancing Toys	CBS Records	-	-	
1984	The Real You	Virgin Records	-	-	
1985	Painted Years	Virgin Records	-	-	
1989	Everything Will Be Alright	-			
1996	For Today - The Best Years	Columbia Records	-	-	
EPs
1983	Netherworld Dancing Toys 12""	Flying Nun Records	10	-	NDT 001
1984	Song And Dance 12""	Flying Nun Records	33	-	NDT 002

=== Featured appearances ===
The group have appeared on a few compilations and soundtracks since the 1980s. The following is a list of these albums that have featured tracks by Netherworld Dancing Toys.

- (2002) – Nature's Best 2 ( label unknown ) – "For Today"
- (2004) – Nature's Best DVD ( label unknown ) – "For Today"
- (2006) – Sione's Wedding OST ( Dawn Raid Entertainment ) – "For Today"

=== Singles ===
Year	Single	Album	NZ Singles Chart	Certification
1985	"For Today"	Painted Years	3	-

== Bibliography ==
- Chunn, Mike and Chunn, Jeremy, The Mechanics of Popular Music, A New Zealand Perspective, GP Publications, 1995. ISBN 1-86956-130-9
- Dix, John, Stranded in Paradise, Penguin, 2005. ISBN 0-14-301953-8
- Eggleton, David, Ready To Fly, Craig Potton, 2003. ISBN 1-877333-06-9
