= Kelz Garage =

2021 single by SWIDT

Single by SWIDT featuring Lomez Brown

from the album 312 Day
- Released: 2 December 2021
- Genre: Reggae, Hip hop
- Length: 3:55
- Label: SWIDT
- Songwriter(s): Amon McGoram; Daniel Latu; Lomez Brown; Samuel Verlinden
- Producer(s): Isiah Libeau

SWIDT singles chronology
"Bunga" (2021)	"Kelz Garage" (2021)	"RSVP" (2022)

Lomez Brown singles chronology
"Kainga (Home)" (2021)	"Kelz Garage" (2021)	"Spiritual Healing" (2022)

Music video
- "Kelz Garage" on YouTube

"Kelz Garage" is a song by New Zealand hip-hop group SWIDT. Originally an instrumental interlude on their 2017 album Stoneyhunga, the song was re-recorded with singer Lomez Brown and released as a single from their EP 312 Day. The song was a commercial success, receiving a gold certification and was one of the top 20 songs by New Zealand artists for 2022.

== Background and composition ==
"Kelz Garage" began as an instrumental on SWIDT's debut studio album Stoneyhunga (2017). Kelz is a friend of the band members, who is known for hosting drinks in his garage.

== Release and promotion ==
A new version of the song featuring Lomez Brown was released as the first track of SWIDT's three song EP 312 Day in December 2021.

The song was part of a music video directed by Connor Pritchard, which was a medley of the three tracks from 312 Day in December 2021. In May 2022, a stand-along music video for the song was created, in a collaboration with Spark New Zealand and Samsung, showcasing illustrations by Harris Keenan. SWIDT and Lomez Brown performed the song live on Breakfast, The Project, and released a live performance video recorded at Roundhead Studios on the band's YouTube channel, that they performed together with R&B group Village90.

== Critical reception ==
Chris Schulz of The New Zealand Herald described the original instrumental from Stoneyhunga as "screaming out for more". Omni Arona of Craccum saw it as the highlight of the EP, describing it as "capturing the vibe of chatting shit with your friends on a Friday night". Reviewers from Sniffers similarly saw the song as the EP's standout track, describing it as a "reggae-infused Pasifika drink-up anthem" with "tropical atmospheres".

The song won Best Pacific Song at the 2022 Pacific Music Awards.

== Credits and personnel ==
Credits adapted from Tidal.

- Lomez Brown – featured artist, additional vocals, songwriter
- Daniel Latu – songwriter
- Isiah Libeau – producer, engineer, mixer, mastering engineer
- Amon McGoram – songwriter
- SWIDT – vocals
- Samuel Verlinden – songwriter

== Charts ==
=== Weekly charts ===
Chart (2022)	Peak position
New Zealand Artist Singles (Recorded Music NZ)	5

=== Year-end charts ===
Chart (2022)	Position
New Zealand Artist Charts (Recorded Music NZ)	19

== Certifications ==
Certifications and sales for "Kelz Garage"
Region	Certification	Certified units/sales
New Zealand (RMNZ)	Gold	15,000^{‡}
^{‡} Sales+streaming figures based on certification alone.
