= Enzso =

Orchestral project

ENZSO
- Origin: New Zealand
- Genres: Orchestral, rock
- Years active: 1995–1999
- Labels: Sony, Epic
- Past members: New Zealand Symphony Orchestra; Eddie Rayner; Dave Dobbyn; Annie Crummer; Neil Finn; Tim Finn; Sam Hunt; Jon Stevens; Boh Runga; Margaret Urlich; Dame Kiri Te Kanawa

ENZSO was an orchestral project started by former Split Enz keyboardist Eddie Rayner. It combines the New Zealand Symphony Orchestra with contemporary pop singers to perform Split Enz songs.

== History ==
The project began with Eddie Rayner. He wanted something more from the old Split Enz songs, and doing orchestral arrangements seemed perfect. Creating the arrangements on his synthesiser, with help from Dave Woodcock, Eddie approached Mark Keyworth of the New Zealand Symphony Orchestra to ask the orchestra to play his arrangements; Keyworth gladly agreed.

With conductor Peter Scholes, the New Zealand Symphony Orchestra, Dave Dobbyn, Annie Crummer, Sam Hunt, Neil Finn, Tim Finn and the New Zealand Youth Choir, they recorded and released their first album in 1996 simply titled ENZSO. Again in 1999 ENZSO recorded a second album titled ENZSO 2.

A film of the collaboration was made by director Justin Pemberton called ENZSO: Dirty Creature.

== Discography ==
=== Albums ===
Title	Details	Peaks		Certifications
Title	Details	NZ	AUS	Certifications
ENZSO	Released: 5 November 1996; Label: Epic, Sony	2	4	RMNZ: Platinum; ARIA: Platinum
ENZSO 2	Released: 16 February 1999; Label: Epic, Sony	25	–	

=== Singles ===
Year	Single	Peaks		Album
Year	Single	NZ	AUS	Album
1995	"Poor Boy"	29	–	ENZSO
1995	"Message to My Girl"	–	56	ENZSO
