= ENZSO 2 =

Studio album by Enzso
- Released: 16 February 1999
- Recorded: 1999
- Genre: Orchestral
- Length: 73:01
- Label: Sony/Epic
- Producer: Dave Woodcock, Eddie Rayner

Enzso chronology
ENZSO (1995)	ENZSO 2 (1999)

Professional ratings
Review scores
Source	Rating
Allmusic	2.5/5 stars

ENZSO 2 is the second release by the ENZSO project led by Eddie Rayner. The orchestral recording sessions were held at Symphony House in Wellington and National Radio Studios for the National Youth Choir. The cover art continues with the orchestral theme from the previous album. Unlike the first ENZSO album, Tim and Neil Finn did not make appearances.

== Track listing ==
1. "Pioneer" (Instrumental)
2. "Six Months in a Leaky Boat" (Instrumental)
3. "History Never Repeats" performed by Jon Stevens
4. "One Step Ahead" performed by Boh Runga
5. "The Devil You Know" performed by Dave Dobbyn
6. "Shark Attack" performed by Sam Hunt
7. "I Walk Away" performed by Jon Stevens
8. "Semi-Detached" performed by Margaret Urlich
9. "Maybe" performed by Dave Dobbyn
10. "Bon Voyage" performed by Dame Kiri Te Kanawa
11. "Frenzy" (Instrumental)

== Charts ==
=== Weekly charts ===
Chart (1999)	Peak position
New Zealand Albums (RMNZ)	25
