= Bernard Tairea =

Cook Island broadcaster

Bernard (Bernice) Tairea (1970s - 24 December 2023) was a broadcaster in New Zealand and the Cook Islands. He had a 30-year career in broadcasting and was a major contributor to Cook Island language broadcasting in New Zealand through Pacific Media Networks.

== Biography ==
Tairea was born in the 1970s in Dunedin, New Zealand. He gained education in the Cook Islands, Fiji, and Australia. Tairea completed his schooling at Tereora in the Cook Islands. His first broadcasting experience was at age 11, on Teen Scene Radio for Radio Cook Islands. His later work experience in the Cook Islands included with Telecom and the Rarotongan Beach Resort & Spa. In the Cook Islands he was part of the Taakoka Dance Troupe.

In 2002 Tairea moved back to New Zealand and soon after started working for Radio 531PI, and helped establish Niu FM. Tairea was a host and producer of Pacific Media Networks' Cook Islands Language Show for many years. He was an advocate for young people to have an interest in Pasifika languages and supported quality broadcasting in language programmes and also mainstream media.

Tairea also contributed to the Pasifika Festival for 20 years including as the Cook Islands village co-ordinator.

== Death ==
Tairea died on 24 December 2023. Fellow broadcaster Seumanu Te’eva Matāfai acknowledged Tairea's long service for the Cook Islands and Pacific communities.
