= Getting Stronger =

2004 single by Adeaze and Aaradhna

Single by Adeaze featuring Aaradhna

from the album Always & for Real
- Released: August 2004
- Length: 3:06
- Label: Dawn Raid Entertainment
- Songwriters: Nainz Tupa'i; Viiz Tupa'i

Adeaze singles chronology
"How Deep Is Your Love" (2004)	"Getting Stronger" (2004)	"Tears in Heaven" (2004)

Aaradhna singles chronology
"Getting Stronger" (2004)	"They Don't Know" (2005)

Audio
- "Getting Stronger" on YouTube

"Getting Stronger" is a song written and performed by New Zealand R&B and soul duo Adeaze. It is a duet with fellow New Zealand singer Aaradhna, who was credited as a co-star for the single release due to her recent signing with Dawn Raid Entertainment. A song about finding one's inner strength, "Getting Stronger" was released as the second single from Adeaze's debut album, Always & for Real, in August 2004. It received heavy radio airplay and gave both acts their first and only number-one single in New Zealand. A music video directed by Kezia Barnett was made to promote the song.

== Release and critical reception ==
"Getting Stronger" was released as a CD single in New Zealand in August 2004, following several weeks of heavy airplay. The CD contains the full version of "Getting Stronger" as well as instrumental and a cappella versions. Critically, music writer Martyn Pepperell called the track an "infectious, platinum-certified slow jam". At the 2005 Pacific Music Awards, the song was nominated for APRA Best Pacific Song, losing to Tha Feelstyle's "Su'amalie".

== Commercial performance ==
Before the CD's release, the song charted on New Zealand's RIANZ Singles Chart on airplay alone, debuting at number 26 on 9 August 2004 and jumping to number five the following week, once the CD was in stores. Afterwards, the song rose to number three on 23 August, then topped the chart on 30 August. It gave Adeaze their third top-10 single and Aaradhna her first, as well as both acts' highest- and longest-charting single in New Zealand, staying in the top 50 for 20 weeks. It ended 2004 as New Zealand's 22nd-most-successful single and was certified triple platinum by Recorded Music NZ (RMNZ) in November 2024 for sales and streaming figures exceeding 90,000 units. According to NZ On Screen, the track was the second-most-played song on New Zealand radio by a native act in 2004.

== Music video ==
The music video for "Getting Stronger" was filmed in June 2004 and was released to TV the following month. Directed by Kezia Barnett, the video shows Aaradhna in a tour bus singing into a big mirror while her reflection sings back certain lyrics on its own. After singing the first chorus into a hairbrush, Aaradhna leaves the bus and meets up with Adeaze, who are revealed to be apparitions, in front of a filming studio. The three then appear in the studio, where they are filmed singing the rest of the song in the room depicted on the cover artwork.

== Charts ==
=== Weekly charts ===
Chart (2004)	Peak position
New Zealand (Recorded Music NZ)	1

=== Year-end charts ===
Chart (2004)	Position
New Zealand (RIANZ)	22

== Certifications ==
Region	Certification	Certified units/sales
New Zealand (RMNZ)	3× Platinum	90,000^{‡}
^{‡} Sales+streaming figures based on certification alone.
