= Bottle Pop =

Single by the Pussycat Dolls featuring Snoop Dogg or Devolo

from the album Doll Domination
- Released: February 23, 2009
- Studio: Chalice (Los Angeles); Irvine Spot (Irvine); Record Plant (Los Angeles)
- Genre: Electronica
- Length: 3:30
- Label: Interscope
- Songwriters: Sean "The Pen" Garrett; Fernando Garibay; Nicole Scherzinger; Calvin Cordazor Broadus
- Producers: Garrett; Garibay

The Pussycat Dolls singles chronology
"I Hate This Part" (2009)	"Bottle Pop" (2009)	"Jai Ho! (You Are My Destiny)" (2009)

Snoop Dogg singles chronology
"Day Dreaming" (2008)	"Bottle Pop" (2009)	"Hot Girl" (2009)

Music video
- "Bottle Pop" on YouTube

"Bottle Pop" is a song by American girl group the Pussycat Dolls for their second studio album Doll Domination (2008). It was written and produced by Sean Garrett and Fernando Garibay, with additional songwriting by group's lead singer Nicole Scherzinger. The song features American rapper Snoop Dogg, whom they previously collaborated with on "Buttons" (2006). It is an electronica song that uses sexual innuendo and has been compared to works of Ciara, Flo Rida, Petey Pablo, Britney Spears, and Gwen Stefani. The single was released in Australia, Germany, and New Zealand between February and March. In the latter country, a remix featuring rapper Devolo was released, replacing Dogg for its local release.

"Bottle Pop" received ambivalent reactions from contemporary music critics; some were receptive of the song's production and picked it as one of the highlights of Doll Domination, whilst others criticized Snoop Dogg's appearance, labeling it as sluggish. The song reached number one on the US Dance Club Songs and peaked at number 17 in Australia and New Zealand. An accompanying music video for the song was directed by Thomas Kloss and features the Pussycat Dolls performing the song in extravagant make-up and outfits. It was included on the set list for their Doll Domination Tour (2009).

== Recording and composition ==
"Bottle Pop" was written and produced by Sean Garrett and Fernando Garibay, with additional production by Clubba Langg. Lead singer Nicole Scherzinger also contributed to the songwriting with coming up with the song's bridge; she took inspiration from Brandon Flowers of the Killers as she "wanted to make it a little bit more rock-y". Garrett previously worked with the Pussycat Dolls on PCD's fourth single, "Buttons" (2006), which also features Snoop Dogg. The vocals were recorded by Miles Walker with the assistance of Mike Hogue, Chris Kasych, and Brian Schunck at Chalice Recording Studios in Los Angeles, California, and at The Record Plant in Hollywood, California. Dogg appears courtesy of Doggy Style Records and Geffen Records, whose vocals were recorded by Chris Jackson at the Irvine Spot in Irvine, California. The keyboards are played by Kennard Garrett and Raymond "Rayza" Oglesby who also handled the additional drum programming. All instrumentation and programming were carried out by Garrett and Garibay. The song was mixed by Tony Maserati at Cannan Road Studios in New York City.

"Bottle Pop" is an electronica song that runs for three minutes and 30 seconds. Production is set to 133 beats per minute. Fraser McAlpine of BBC Radio 1 opined that rhythmically it borrows from Flo Rida's "Low" (2007), Ciara's "Goodies" (2004), and Petey Pablo's "Freek-A-Leek" (2003), but with the Pussycat Dolls' signature sensual sound. Moreover, Nick Levin from Digital Spy compared the sound to material from Britney Spears's Blackout (2007). Lyrically, the song uses sexual innuendo with Scherzinger adopting "breathy vocals", which were compared to Gwen Stefani by Yahoo Music's Jamie Gill.

== Release and reception ==
A remix of "Bottle Pop" featuring New Zealand rapper Devolo was released as a digital download on February 23, 2009, in New Zealand. Interscope Records requested for a local rapper to replace Dogg in its regional release. In March 2009, a two-track version was available for digital download in Australia, while in Germany an extended play (EP) was released consisting of remixes of "Bottle Pop".

New York Daily News critic Jim Farber wrote that "Bottle Pop" has "a moronic hook [listeners] can't resist". Mariel Concepcion from Billboard magazine opined that "Bottle Pop" induces the listeners with "visceral thrills". Nick Bond of MTV Australia and Levine of Digital Spy regarded the song as one of the musical highlights of Doll Domination, with the former describing "pneumatic". Spence D. of IGN described the song as "insidious" adding "it's straight Mac 'n Cheese, ultimately not the most healthy choice, but kind of tasty nonetheless". The Province's Stuart Derdeyn wrote that the song "boasts a [Dogg] rap that he could've come up with in his sleep;" nonetheless he highlighted the song as one of the album's best tracks for Garret's "sharp" production. Nic Oliver of musicOMH agreed with Derdeyn equating Dogg's contribution to someone who is sleepwalking, adding that the lyrics were written by a "sophomore student on a weekend bender". Rudy Klapper from Sputnikmusic deemed Dogg's guest spot as "one of the weaker ones of his career" adding "the track's lackluster chorus deflate[s] any energy he might have afforded them". Similarly, a reviewer from Entertainment.ie commented that Dogg lowered himself "to new levels of cheese" with his contribution. Stephen Thomas Erlewine of Allmusic also criticized the rapper's appearance, labeling it as "phoned-in". Rashod Ollison of The Baltimore Sun used the same phrase as Erlewine when describing Dogg's appearance, adding he "[does] nothing to elevate the calculated [track]".

"Bottle Pop" first appeared at number 88 on the Canadian Hot 100 chart of October 11, 2008. Following its single release in New Zealand, the remix featuring Devolo entered at number 19, denying Dogg's 19th chart appearance and giving the Dolls their ninth charting single in the territory. In the following week it peaked at number 17. In Australia, the song debuted at number 81 on the ARIA Singles Chart and went on to peak at number 17, four weeks later. "Bottle Pop" debuted at number 53 on Billboard's US Dance Club Songs chart for the week ending March 14, 2009. After nine weeks ascending the chart, the track went on to top the chart for the week ending May 16, 2009, after its position at number two the previous week. This gave the Dolls their fifth consecutive number-one in as many tries and became Dogg's fourth consecutive chart-topper.

== Promotion ==
Thomas Kloss directed the music video for "Bottle Pop" in early January. Speaking to MTV News, Scherzinger elaborated that the video focuses on dance. "It's gonna be so much fun. It's gonna be a dance video. Obviously, you can tell by our wardrobe, it's going to be very colorful and fun ... freaky fun! You guys are going to be wanting to pop some bottles after this one." The music video premiered on February 1, 2009 and uses an alternative version of the song that doesn't feature Snoop Dogg. Jocelyn Vena of MTV described the group's styling as a "lethal combination of barely there costumes, big hair and lots of makeup". The Pussycat Dolls first performed "Bottle Pop" during Dick Clark's New Year's Rockin' Eve with Ryan Seacrest '09 that was broadcast live by ABC on December 31, 2008. The song was included on the set list for the Dolls' headlining Doll Domination Tour (2009).

== Track listings ==
- CD single / digital download (2-track)
1. "Bottle Pop" (Album Version) — 3:32
2. "Bottle Pop" (Moto Blanco Club Mix) — 6:53
- Digital download (Devolo Mix Version)
1. "Bottle Pop" (Devolo Mix Version) — 3:31
- Digital download (3-track)
1. "Bottle Pop" (Album Version) — 3:30
2. "Bottle Pop" (Video Version) — 3:00
3. "Bottle Pop" (Dave Audé Club Mix) — 8:31
- Digital download (Remixes)
1. "Bottle Pop" (Dave Audé Radio Mix) — 3:41
2. "Bottle Pop" (Moto Blanco Radio Mix) — 3:07
3. "Bottle Pop" (Moto Blanco Club Mix) — 6:51
4. "Bottle Pop" (Moto Blanco Dub Mix) —6:38
5. "Bottle Pop" (Digital Dog Extended Mix) — 4:03
6. "Bottle Pop" (Digital Dog Radio Mix) — 3:01
7. "Bottle Pop" (Digital Dog Extended Mix II) — 4:03
8. "Bottle Pop" (Digital Dog Radio Mix II) — 3:01

== Credits and personnel ==
Credits adapted from the liner notes of Doll Domination and Universal Music Publishing.

Recording

- Recorded at Chalice Studio B (Los Angeles, California); The Record Plant (Hollywood, California); Irvine Spot (Irvine, California)
- Mixed at Canaan Road Studios (New York City)

Personnel

- Calvin Cordazor "Snoop Dogg" Broadus – songwriter
- Fernando Garibay – songwriter, producer, instrumentation, programming
- Kennard Garrett – keyboards
- Sean "The Pen" Garrett – songwriter, producer, instrumentation, programming
- Mike Hogue – assistant recording
- Chris Kasych – assistant recording
- Clubba Langg – co-producer
- Tony Maserati – mixer
- Raymond "Rayza" Oglesby – keyboards, additional drum programming
- Nicole Scherzinger – songwriter
- Brian Schunck – assistant recording
- Miles Walker – recording
- Matt Wheeler – recording (Snoop Dogg's vocals)

== Charts ==
=== Weekly charts ===
Weekly peak performance for "Bottle Pop"
Chart (2009)	Peak position
Australia (ARIA)	17
Australian Urban (ARIA)	5
Belgium (Ultratip Bubbling Under Flanders)	9
Canada Hot 100 (Billboard)	88
New Zealand (Recorded Music NZ) Devolo Mix	17
UK Physical Singles (OCC)	80
US Dance Club Songs (Billboard)	1

=== Year-end charts ===
Year-end chart performance for "Bottle Pop"
Chart (2009)	Position
Australian Urban (ARIA)	43
US Dance Club Songs (Billboard)	21

== Release history ==
Release dates and formats for "Bottle Pop"
Region	Date	Format(s)	Version(s)	Label(s)	Ref.
New Zealand	February 23, 2009	Digital download	Devolo Mix	Universal Music	
Australia	March 6, 2009	Digital download	Original	Universal Music	
Germany	March 13, 2009	Digital download (EP)	Remixes	Universal Music	

== See also ==
- List of number-one dance singles of 2009 (U.S.)
