= Heaven & Hell (Devolo album) =

Studio album by Devolo
- Released: November 3, 2008
- Recorded: 2008
- Genre: Hip hop
- Label: Dawn Raid Entertainment

Heaven & Hell is the debut solo-album by New Zealand/Hip-Hop artist Devolo. The album's first single "Somebody" became a top 10 hit on the NZ iTunes top songs for all genres and #1 on NZ iTunes top hip hop downloads. The second single "Too Shy" jumped from #38 to #6 in one week on New Zealand’s RIANZ Top 40 Singles Chart. The album's third single was released one year after the original released of the album, it reached #6 on the IMNZ Top 10 Airplay.

== Track listing ==
1. "King David"
2. "Somebody"
3. "Too Shy"
4. "Can't Let You Go" (Ft. Lemuel)
5. "Good Day"
6. "Take It Back"
7. "Let Me In" (Ft. TJ)
8. "Heaven & Hell"
9. "Bring It"
10. "God Chose Me" (Ft. Savage)
11. "Fresh Til My Death" (Ft. Mareko)
12. "I Wanna Know" (Ft. TJ)
13. "Think About You"
14. "Thank you"
