= Street Rap =

Single by Mareko
- B-side: "Don't Need Protection"
- Released: 12 December 2003
- Genre: Hip hop
- Label: Dawn Raid Entertainment
- Songwriter(s): J Hunter; Mark Sagapolutele
- Producer(s): V.I.C.

Mareko singles chronology
"Stop Drop & Roll" (2003)	"Street Rap" (2003)	"I Do Believe (Tha Remix)" (2006)

"Street Rap" is a single by New Zealand hip-hop artist Mareko which features Wu-Tang Clan member Inspectah Deck and was released in 2003.

== Track listing ==
- Side A
1. "Street Rap" (Clean) featuring Inspectah Deck
2. "Street Rap" (Street) featuring Inspectah Deck
3. "Street Rap" (Instrumental)
- Side B
1. "Don't Need Protection" (Clean) featuring Scram Jones & Roc Raida
2. "Don't Need Protection" (Street) featuring Scram Jones & Roc Raida
3. "Don't Need Protection" (Instrumental)
