= Dawn Raid Entertainment =

New Zealand hip-hop record company

Dawn Raid Entertainment is a record label based in Papatoetoe, South Auckland, New Zealand. It has signed many New Zealand hip hop and R&B artists such as Savage, Adeaze, Aaradhna, The Deceptikonz, Devolo and Ill Semantics. The founders of Dawn Raid Entertainment announced the closure of the recording label on 19 April 2007 due to liquidation.

By June 2007, due to new owners, the label started operating again. Artists represented include Savage, Mareko, The Deceptikonz, Horsemen Family, Sweet & Irie.

At its peak, Dawn Raid Entertainment was home to many gold and platinum-selling New Zealand hip hop and R&B artists.

== History ==
School friends Danny "Brotha D" Leaosavai'i and Andy Murnane founded Dawn Raid Entertainment in 1999. The label's name was a reference to the dawn raids of the 1970s and 1980s that disproportionately targeted members of the Pasifika community in New Zealand. They started selling T-shirts at a market in Ōtara to raise capital. In 2007, the label went into liquidation for a few months.

In 2020, Oscar Kightley directed the documentary Dawn Raid, to be distributed by Universal and released in New Zealand cinemas on 21 January 2021.

== Sponsorship ==
In May 2004, Dawn Raid became a sponsor for the Telecom subsidiary company Boost Mobile and released a single Hook Up featuring both the prominent and the unknown talent of Dawn Raid Entertainment. Currently, Hook Up is still the theme for Boost Mobile with some of their signed musicians doing voiceovers for the ads.

== Label Artists ==
- Monsta Ganjah (The Regime)
- Savage
- Sweet & Irie (Reggae Band)
- Devolo
- Aaradhna
- Adeaze
- FRISKO
- Brotha D
- Deceptikonz
- DJ Peter Gunz & Tikelz
- Horsemen Family
- Mareko
- Ill Semantics
- DJCXL
- R.E.S.
- K.A.O.S.

== Discography ==
=== Albums ===
The following is a list of albums and singles released under the Dawn Raid label. The first album released under Dawn Raid was a compilation titled Southside Story which was released in April 2000 and featured undiscovered artists such as Ill Semantics, 4 Corners, Native Sons, K.A.O.S., Adeaze, Live Live and the co-founder of Dawn Raid, Brotha D.

| Date of Release | Title | Artist | Charted | Country | Certification |
|---|---|---|---|---|---|
Albums
| April 2000 | Southside Story | Various Artists | - | - | |
| May 2001 | Southside Story 2: International | Various Artists | - | - | |
| March 2002 | Elimination | Deceptikonz | # 2 | - | |
| November 2002 | Theory of Meaning | Ill Semantics | # 38 | - | |
| July 2003 | White Sunday | Mareko | # 4 | - | Gold |
| May 2004 | Always and For Real | Adeaze | # 1 | - | 2 X Platinum |
| October 2004 | Red Eye Society (also under Clientele Records) | R.E.S. | - | - | |
| October 2004 | The Best Kept Secret (also under Clientele Records) | Alphrisk | - | - | |
| April 2005 | Moonshine | Savage | # 2 | - | Platinum |
| January 2006 | Street Dreams | DJ Peter Gunz & Tikelz | # 10 | - | |
| March 2006 | Sione's Wedding OST | Various | # 14 | - | Gold |
| May 2006 | I Love You | Aaradhna | # 13 | - | |
| 2 October 2006 | Good Musik | Ill Semantics | - | - | |
| October 2006 | Heavy Rotation | Deceptikonz | - | - | |
| October 2007 | Brotha D & The Dawn Raid Family - Element of Surprise | Various Artists | - | - | |
| January 2008 | Horsemen Family - My Shout: The Album | Various Artists | - | - | |
| February 2008 | Sweet Soul Music | Aaradhna | - | - | |
| April 2008 | White Sunday 2: The Book of Mark | Mareko | - | - | |
| November 2008 | Heaven & Hell | Devolo | - | - | |
| December 2008 | Savage Island | Savage | # 10 | - | |
| July 2009 | Localize It | Sweet & Irie | # 10 | - | |
| March 2010 | Brotha D & The Dawn Raid Family - Volume 2 | Various Artists | - | - | |
| March 2010 | Pasifika: The Collection | Various Artists | # 1 | - | |
| July 2010 | Evolution: Past, Present, Beyond | Deceptikonz | # 26 | - | |
| October 2010 | Pacific Coast Highway | MONSTA | - | - | |
| October 2010 | Savage Presents The Tribal Council | Various Artists | - | - | |
| March 2011 | Pasifika: The Collection Volume 2 | Various Artists | # 1 | - | |
EPs
| May 2003 | Mareko Is The Future - Dawn Raid Mix Tape | Mareko | - | - | |
| May 2003 | Blood on the BBQ Mixtape | Mareko & Savage | - | - | |
| December 2003 | Street Rap | Mareko featuring Inspectah Deck | - | - | |
| April 2006 | We Back Motherf***az | Deceptikonz | - | - | |
| March 2008 | Live at the Apollo Mixtape | Mareko | - | - | |
| May 2010 | Allow Me To Re-Introduce Myself | MONSTA | - | - | |

=== Singles ===
| Year | Artist | Single | Album | Charted | Certification |
|---|---|---|---|---|---|
| 2003 | Ill Semantics featuring Betty Anne | "Watching You/Highway" | Theory of Meaning | # 22 | - |
| 2003 | Mareko | "Mareko (Here To Stay)" | White Sunday | # 4 | Gold |
| 2003 | Adeaze | "A Life With You" | Always and For Real | # 3 | Platinum |
| 2003 | Mareko featuring the Deceptikonz | "Stop, Drop and Roll" | White Sunday | # 6 | Gold |
| 2004 | Adeaze | "How Deep Is Your Love" | Always and For Real | # 6 | Gold |
| 2004 | Dawn Raid All-Stars | "Hook Up" | - | #9 | - |
| 2004 | Adeaze featuring Aaradhna | "Getting Stronger" | Always and For Real | *#1 (NZ) | Gold |
| 2005 | Savage | "Swing" | Moonshine | *#1 (NZ) | Platinum |
| 2005 | Alphrisk | "Sunshine" | The Best Kept Secret | # 8 | - |
| 2005 | Savage | "Moonshine" | Moonshine | *#1 (NZ), #9 Aust | Platinum NZ |
| 2005 | Savage featuring Aaradhna | "They Don't Know" | Moonshine | # 3, #26 Aust | Gold NZ |
| 2006 | Aaradhna | "Down Time" | I Love You | # 3 | Gold |
| 2006 | Tha Feelstyle featuring Mareko, Flowz; Manuel Bundy & Lapi Mariner | "I Do Believe" | Sione's Wedding OST | # 17 | - |
| 2006 | Aaradhna | "Shake" | I Love You | - | - |
| 2006 | Aaradhna | "I Love You Too" | I Love You | *#5 (NZ) | - |
| 2006 | Deceptikonz | "Don't Front On Me" | Heavy Rotation | - | - |
| 2006 | Ill Semantics | "On And On" (featuring Lemuel) | Good Musik | # 38 | - |
| 2007 | Brotha D feat Sweet & Irie | "Take It out South" | Brotha D & The Dawn Raid Family - Element of Surprise | # 8 | GOLD |
| 2007 | Horsemen Family | "Drink With Us" | My Shout: The Album | - | - |
| 2008 | Horsemen Family feat Sweet & Irie | "Feels Like Magic" | My Shout: The Album | # 8 | GOLD |
| 2008 | Mareko | "Gotta Go" | White Sunday 2: The Book of Mark | - | - |
| 2008 | Sweet & Irie | "Mama, Don't Cry" | Localize It | - | - |
| 2008 | Aaradhna | "Betcha By Golly Wow" | Sweet Soul Music | - | - |
| 2008 | Mareko | "Record of the Year" | White Sunday 2: The Book of Mark | - | - |
| 2008 | Devolo | "Somebody" | Heaven & Hell | - | - |
| 2008 | Beat Kamp | "Rap Game Remix" | Single | - | - |
| 2008 | Sweet & Irie | "My Girl" | Localize It | - | - |
| 2008' | Savage | " SWING " US REMIX feat Soulja Boy Tell'em | SAVAGE ISLAND | # 45 US | RIAA 2 X Platinum |
| 2008 | Devolo | " Too Shy" | Heaven & Hell | # 6 | - |
| 2008 | Mareko Feat. J.Williams | "Them Eyes" | White Sunday 2: The Book of Mark | - | - |
| 2009 | Savage Feat Angel & Baby Bash | "Wild Out (ChoooHooo)" | Savage Island | # 6 | GOLD |
| 2009 | Savage Feat Rock City | "Hot Like Fire" | Savage Island | # 26 | GOLD |
| 2009 | Sweet & Irie | "Sweet & Irie" | Localize It | - | - |
| 2009 | Savage Feat Rock City | "I Love The Islands" | Savage Island | - | - |
| 2009 | Sweet & Irie | "Jenny" | Localize It | - | - |
| 2009 | Frisko Feat. Aaradhna | "Music (Makes The World Go Around)" | Brotha D & The Dawn Raid Family Volume 2 | # 15 | - |
| 2010 | Devolo | "Rocker Girl" | Brotha D & The Dawn Raid Family Volume 2 | - | - |
| 2010 | Deceptikonz Feat. Adeaze | "Evolution" | Evolution: Past, Present, Beyond | - | - |
| 2010 | MONSTA | "Long Beach Raised Me" | Pacific Coast Highway | - | - |
| 2010 | MONSTA Feat. Yukmouth & Ganxsta Ridd | "Wesperados" | Pacific Coast Highway | - | - |
| 2010 | MONSTA Feat. J-Boog | "This Is Love" | Evolution: Past, Present, Beyond | # 22 | GOLD |
| 2010 | MONSTA Feat. Aaradhna | "Like You" | Pacific Coast Highway | - | - |

== See also ==
- Lists of record labels
