= Annie Crummer =

New Zealand singer

Annie Crummer MNZM
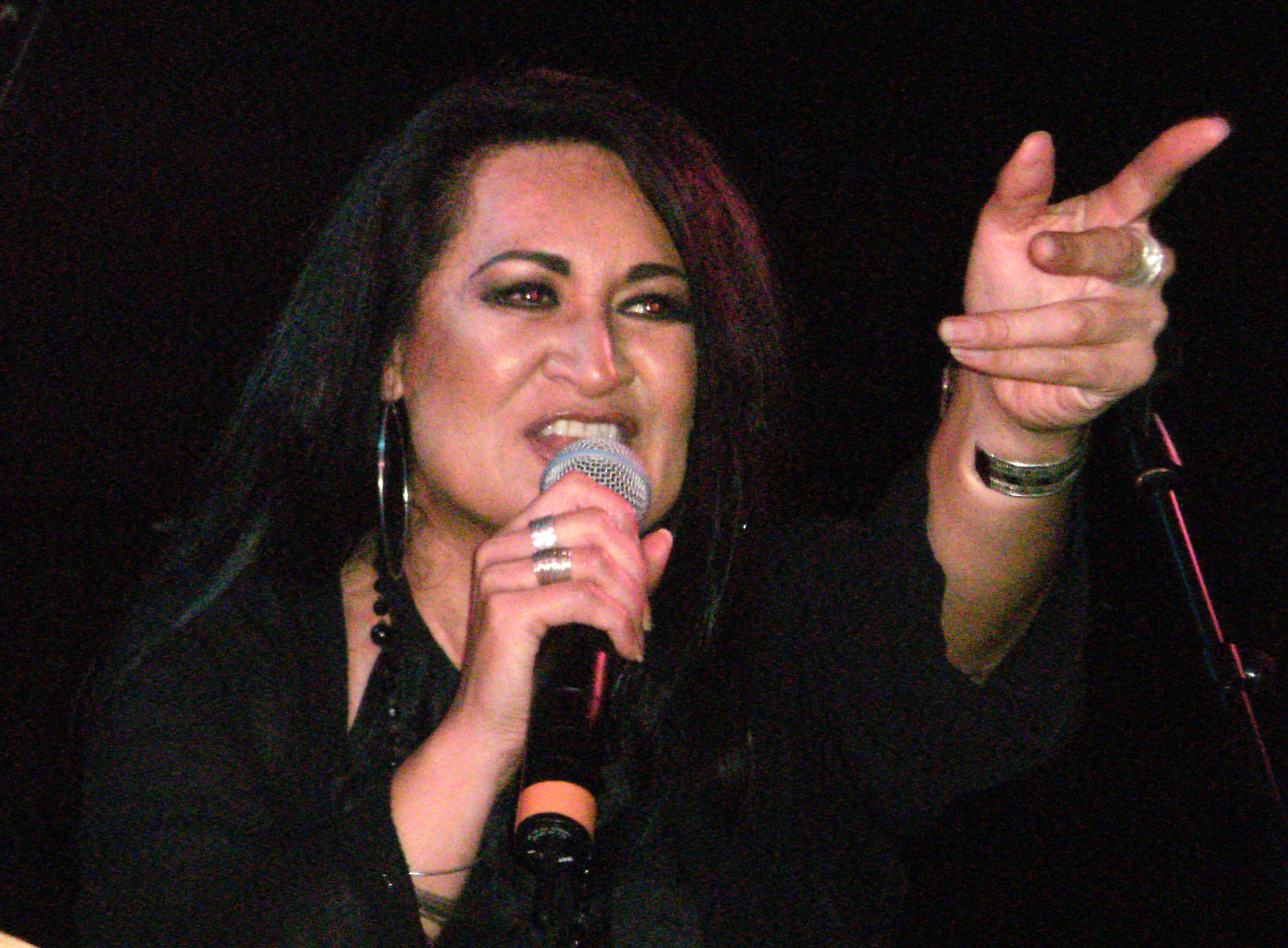
- Crummer at Bar Bodega, Wellington, 2011

Background information
- Born: Anne Crummer; 1966 (age 59–60)
- Origin: New Zealand
- Genre: Pop
- Years active: 1982–present
- Website: www.anniecmusic.com

Anne Crummer MNZM (born 1966) is a New Zealand pop singer and songwriter of Cook Islands descent who has seen success in both a solo career and as part of various musical groups.

Crummer represented New Zealand at the 1987 ABU Popular Song Contest with the song "It's That What Friends Are For", placing third.

== Biography ==
Crummer grew up in West Auckland. Her father, Will Crummer, a Cook Islander, was one of her strongest musical influences. Her mother Tangi is Tahitian. Crummer was a precocious singer, performing at Cook Island nightclubs and shopping mall talent quests. At the age of 9, Will Crummer tried to interest her in piano lessons and took her to singing coach Sister Mary Leo, but Crummer preferred to learn from her father. She attended Avondale College, leaving at the age of "15 years and two months" to focus on a singing career. She appeared on the TV talent show Opportunity Knocks, won, and released her first single at the age of 16.

At the age of 18 Crummer stood out as a guest vocalist in the Netherworld Dancing Toys hit song "For Today", which was Single of the Year at the 1985 New Zealand Music Awards. She was one of the five founders of the all-female band When The Cat's Away in 1986; their cover of the 1969 Blue Mink song "Melting Pot" topped the charts in New Zealand, and the band won Group of the Year in the 1989 New Zealand Music Awards. Crummer has also performed with Herbs. Crummer released her first solo album, Language, in 1992, and her second, Seventh Wave (co-written with Barbara Griffen) in 1996. Seventh Wave was completed at Prince's studio, Paisley Park.

She recorded the Split Enz song "I Hope I Never" as part of the ENZSO project in 1996. In 1993 she had a role on New Zealand soap opera Shortland Street and recorded a single "Keeping Up the Love Thing", which featured on the show. She has performed with Australian singers John Farnham and Jimmy Barnes, and toured Australia for a month with Sting, singing on stage with him on "Let Your Soul Be Your Pilot". In 1996, she was chosen as the supporting act for Michael Jackson's New Zealand tour.

Crummer was diagnosed with dyslexia as an adult and says she cannot read or write or read music, but she credits her dyslexia with giving her a heightened sense of musical appreciation. She did one semester of Cook Islands Māori language at the University of Auckland in 2000.

Part of her work in the music industry has been mentoring in song writing and performing, including in prisons and for Smokefree Rock Quest. In 2014 she was a musical mentor for prisoners in the Māori Television series Songs from the Inside.

On stage, she was a soloist in the musical Rent in Australia and New Zealand, and played the Killer Queen in We Will Rock You (WWRY) in Melbourne in 2005. The Australian production of WWRY toured throughout Australia, New Zealand, Asia, and South Africa. Crummer reprised her role in 2019. She is currently working on her third album, Project Annie C.

== Honours and awards ==
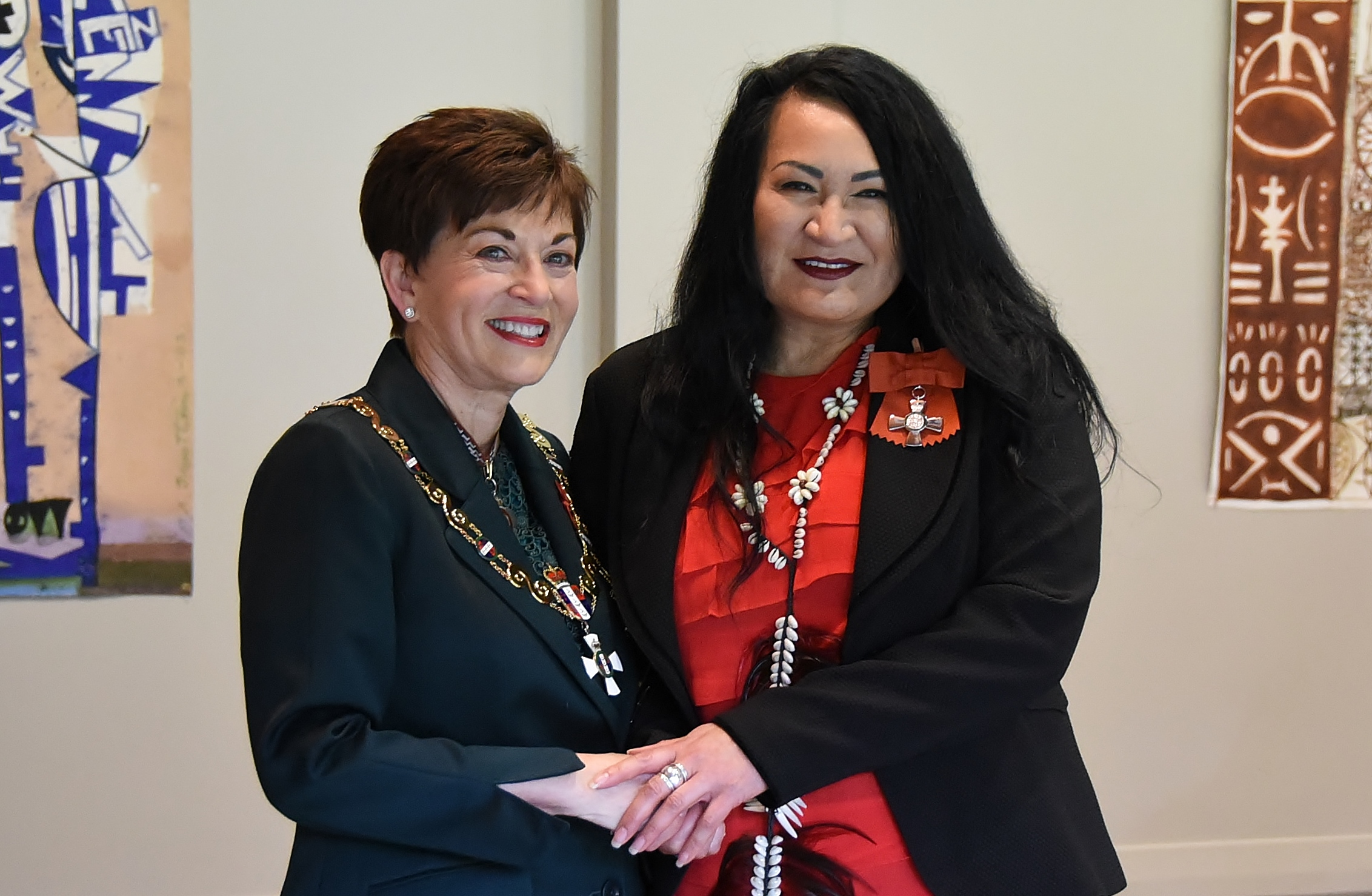
Crummer (right), after her investiture as Member of the New Zealand Order of Merit by the governor-general, Dame Patsy Reddy, in 2017

Crummer was awarded Best Female Artist at the New Zealand Music Awards in 1993, and nominated for the same category at the ARIA Music Awards in Australia in 1996. In 2011 Crummer was awarded Senior Pacific Artist Award at the Creative New Zealand Arts Pasifika Awards. In the same year she also received a Lifetime Achievement Award at the Pacific Music Awards.

Crummer was appointed a Member of the New Zealand Order of Merit for services to music in the 2017 Queen's Birthday Honours.

In December 2021 Crummer and the other four members of When the Cats Away were inducted into the New Zealand Music Hall of Fame at the Aotearoa Music Awards in recognition of their contributions to New Zealand music.

== Discography ==
Date	Title	Label	Chart		Certification	Catalog Number
Date	Title	Label	NZ	AUS	Certification	Catalog Number
Albums
1992	Language	WEA International	9	—	–	4509912062
1996	Seventh Wave	Warner Music	5	28	–	0630159462
2002	Shine: The Best of Annie Crummer	Warner Music (NZ)	23	—	–	0927482502
Featured
1996	ENZSO (with ENZSO)	Epic Records	2	4	AUS: Platinum	
2001	Live in Paradise (with When The Cat's Away)	EMI	7	—	NZL: Platinum	537030

=== Compilation appearances ===
The following albums have featured tracks by Crummer.

- (1996) – In The Neighbourhood (Warner Music) – Language
- (1998) – New Zealand Compositions (Centre For New Zealand Music) – I Hope I Never (with ENZSO)
- (2011) – Shoebox Lovesongs: the Rarotongan Music of Will Crummer (Ode Records)

=== Singles as main artist ===
Year	Title	Peak chart positions		Album
Year	Title	NZ	AUS	Album
1982	"Once Or Twice"	16	—	Non-album single
1992	"See What Love Can Do" (featuring Herbs)	3	—	Language
1992	"Language"	1 (Note: "Language" was number one in Italy for 3 weeks, Spain 2 weeks, New Zealand 7 weeks, Hawaii 10 weeks, Samoa 1 week, United Kingdom 7 weeks, and Japan 5 weeks.)		Language
1992	"See Forever"	—	—	Language
1993	"Seven Waters"	18	—	
1993	"Let It Shine"	11	—	Non-album single
1996	"State of Grace"	8	52	Seventh Wave
1996	"U Soul Me"	21	48	Seventh Wave
1997	"I Come Alive"	—	—	Seventh Wave
2002	"Love Not War"	46	—	Non-album single
2010	"Had It Comin'"	—	—	Non-album single
2010	"Let It Fly"	—	—	
2010	"Ocean Moon (1st Tide Mix)"	—	—	
"—" denotes a recording that did not chart or was not released in that territory.

=== Singles as featured artist ===
Year	Title	Peak chart positions		Album
Year	Title	NZ	AUS	Album
1985	"For Today" (with the Netherworld Dancing Toys)	3	—	Painted Years
1986	"Ngoi Ngoi" (with the Pātea Māori Club)	—	—	Poi E
1988	"Melting Pot" (with When the Cat's Away)	1	103	Non-album single
1988	"New Zealand Expo Song: God Defend New Zealand" (as the Pātea Māori Club)	—	—	Non-album single
1989	"Free Ride" (with When the Cat's Away)	12	—	Non-album single
1993	"Keeping Up the Love Thing" (as The Katene Sisters)	3	—	Non-album single
1996	"I Hope I Never" (as part of ENZSO)	—	—	ENZSO
2003	"Another One Bites the Dust" (with Queen)	—	—	Non-album single
"—" denotes a recording that did not chart or was not released in that territory.
