= Dawn Raid All-Stars =

New Zealand musical group

- Origin: New Zealand
- Genre: Hip hop
- Years active: 2004
- Label: Dawn Raid Entertainment
- Past members: Mareko; Savage; Femme Fatale; Alphrisk; DJ Sirvere

Dawn Raid All-Stars are a New Zealand hip hop musical collaboration between Dawn Raid Entertainment and Boost Mobile which brought together all the artists of Dawn Raid as a collective group in 2004.

== Discography ==
=== Singles ===
Year	Single	Album	NZ Singles Chart	Certification
2004	"Hook Up"		9	-
