= Lemuel =

- Pronunciation: /ˈlɛmjuːl/
- Gender: Male

Origin
- Origin: Hebrew
- Meaning: "devoted to God"

Lemuel is a Hebrew name, meaning "devoted to God", which may refer to:

== In religion ==
- Lemuel (biblical king), mentioned in the Book of Proverbs, Chapter 31
- Lemuel (Book of Mormon), the second eldest of Lehi's sons and the brother of Laman, Sam, Nephi, Jacob and Joseph

== People ==
- Lemuel Francis Abbott (c. 1760 – 1802), English portrait painter
- Lemuel Amerman (1846–1897), member of the U.S. House of Representatives from Pennsylvania
- Lemuel H. Arnold (1792–1852), 12th Governor of Rhode Island and United States congressman
- Lemuel Benton (1754–1818), American planter and politician, member of the U.S. House of Representatives from South Carolina
- Lemuel J. Bowden (1815–1864), American lawyer, politician and U.S. senator from Virginia
- Lemuel de Bra (1884–1954), American writer
- Lemuel G. Brandebury (1810–1875), first chief justice of the Supreme Court of the Utah Territory
- Lemuel Carpenter (c. 1808 – 1859), one of the first Anglo-American settlers in what is now the Los Angeles area, entrepreneur and rancher
- Lemuel Chenoweth (1811–1887), American carpenter, legislator and self-taught architect
- Lemuel Cushing Jr. (1842–1881), Canadian lawyer and politician
- Lemuel D. Evans (1810–1877), American politician and Chief Justice of the Texas Supreme Court
- Lemuel L. Foster (1891–1981) American civil servant, community leader, business executive
- Lemuel Grant (1817–1893), American engineer, businessman, land speculator and civic leader
- Lemuel Haynes (1753–1833), African American religious leader and slavery opponent
- Lemuel Jenkins (1789–1862), American lawyer and member of the U.S. House of Representatives from New York
- Lemuel McPherson Christian (1913–2000), Dominican composer
- Lemuel Mathewson (1899–1970), U.S. Army lieutenant general
- Lemuel Owen (1822–1912), shipbuilder, banker, merchant, politician and the second Premier of Prince Edward Island, Canada
- Lemuel P. Padgett (1855–1922), member of the U.S. House of Representatives from Tennessee
- Lemuel Paynter (1788–1863), member of the U.S. House of Representatives from Pennsylvania
- Lemuel Penn (1915–1964), African-American lieutenant colonel murdered by members of the Ku Klux Klan
- Lemuel E. Prowse (1858–1925), merchant and politician in Prince Edward Island, Canada
- Lemuel E. Quigg (1863–1919), U.S. Representative from New York
- Lemuel Sawyer (1777–1852), Congressional Representative from North Carolina
- Lemuel Shaw (1781–1861), Chief Justice of the Massachusetts Supreme Court, member of the Massachusetts House of Representatives and state senator
- Lemuel C. Shepherd Jr. (1896–1990), United States Marine Corps four-star general and 20th Commandant of the Marine Corps
- Lemuel Smith (born 1941), serial killer
- Lemuel Smith (cricketer) (1880–1927), English cricketer
- Lemuel F. Smith (1890–1956), Virginia lawyer and judge
- Lemuel Stetson (1804–1868), U.S. Representative from New York
- Lemuel Stinson (born 1966), former National Football League cornerback
- Lemuel Todd (1817–1891), member of the U.S. House of Representatives from Pennsylvania
- Lemuel John Tweedie (1849–1917), Canadian politician and 10th Premier of New Brunswick
- Lemuel Whitman (1780–1841), U.S. Representative from Connecticut
- Lemuel M. Wiles (1826-1905), American landscape painter.
- Lemuel Williams (1747–1828), U.S. Representative from Massachusetts
- Lemuel Wilmarth (1835–1918), French painter and founded of Art Students League of New York
- Lemuel Allan Wilmot (1809–1878), Canadian lawyer, politician, and judge

== Fictional characters ==
- Lemuel Gulliver, protagonist of Gulliver's Travels
- Lemuel "Lemmy" Barnet, in the BBC Radio science fiction programme Journey into Space
- Lemuel "Chipper" Barnet, in the BBC Radio science fiction programme Space Force
- Lemuel "Lemmy" Caution, special agent / private detective created by Peter Cheyney
- Lemuel Dorcas, a Marvel Comics character
- Lemuel Idzik, on the American television show Oz
- Lemuel (Camp Lazlo), in the American animated television series Camp Lazlo
- Lemuel, an antagonist in the American animated television series Fanboy & Chum Chum
- Lemuel Siddons, in the movie Follow Me, Boys!
