= Keeping Up the Love Thing =

1993 song by The Katene Sisters

Song by The Katene Sisters
- Released: 1993
- Length: 3:27
- Label: Warner
- Songwriter(s): Annie Crummer; Barbara Griffin

"Keeping Up the Love Thing" is the debut single and sole release by New Zealand novelty group The Katene Sisters, consisting of singer Annie Crummer alongside actresses Nancy Brunning and Lisa Crittenden. Created as part of a 1993 storyline in the soap opera Shortland Street, a show in which Brunning and Crittenden played major roles, the song was later released commercially through WMG and reached the top 3 of the New Zealand singles chart in August 1993.

== Background and development ==
Brunning and Crittenden belonged to the sixteen original cast members of Shortland Street present from its 1992 inception. Respectively, they starred as nurses Jaki Manu and Carrie Burton. "Keeping Up the Love Thing" transpired from a story involving Manu's past involvement in a vocal trio called The Katene Sisters with two of her cousins, one of which (Marlene Katene) was played by Crummer. Plans for the trio to reunite for a talent show at a bar were put into jeopardy, however, when the other cousin fell ill at the last minute. Burton took her place for the group's performance of "Keeping Up the Love Thing," a past hit of theirs, though they wound up ultimately not winning the contest.

The track was written by Crummer and Barbara Griffin, formerly of the Holidaymakers. Brunning initially felt hesitant about it receiving a commercial release but was convinced of its merit by Crittenden; "Keeping Up the Love Thing" went on to additionally receive a music video, portraying The Katene Sisters performing the song in a recording studio.

== Track listing ==
New Zealand cassingle

1. "Keeping Up the Love Thing" (radio edit)
2. "Keeping Up the Love Thing" (Wireless remix)
3. "Keeping Up the Love Thing" (karaoke mix)

== Charts ==
Chart (1993)	Peak position
New Zealand (Recorded Music NZ)	3
