= Stop, Drop and Roll (song) =

Single by Mareko featuring Deceptikonz
- Released: November 2003
- Recorded: 2003
- Genre: Hip hop
- Label: Dawn Raid Entertainment

Mareko singles chronology
"Mareko (Here to Stay)" (2003)	"Stop, Drop and Roll" (2003)	"Hook Up" (2004)

"Stop, Drop and Roll" is a song by New Zealand hip hop artist Mareko featuring the Deceptikonz. The single was released in 2003 and hit No. 6 on the New Zealand charts.

The music video for the song was directed by Sophie Findlay and is a "humorous take" on various army films like Full Metal Jacket. In it, Mareko (playing the Commanding Officer) and his troops (the Deceptikonz) bark orders and harass recruits.

== Track listings ==
1. "Stop, Drop & Roll"
2. "Stop, Drop & Roll (Instrumental)"
3. "Stop, Drop & Roll (41:30 Remix)" (featuring Deceptikonz, Scribe & Flowz)
4. "Stop, Drop & Roll" (Video)
