= Malcolm Black =

New Zealand musician and lawyer (1961–2019)

Malcolm Black ONZM
- Born: Malcolm James Prentice Black; 10 February 1961
- Died: 10 May 2019 (aged 58) Auckland, New Zealand
- Occupation: Lawyer

Malcolm James Prentice Black ONZM (10 February 1961 – 10 May 2019) was a New Zealand musician and lawyer. He was a member of 1980s Dunedin band, Netherworld Dancing Toys, and was the first specialist music industry lawyer in New Zealand.

== Early life and family ==
Born in 1961, Black was the son of James Alexander Prentice Black and Lesley Grace Wardell. He grew up in the Dunedin suburb of Waverley, and was educated at Otago Boys' High School. He went on to graduate with a law degree from the University of Otago. Black was twice married, first to artist Tracey Tawhiao, with whom he had two children, and later to Julia, with whom he had two more children.

== Netherworld Dancing Toys ==
Black played in several bands while still at high school, and joined Netherworld Dancing Toys in 1982 as a singer and guitarist during his second year at university. In 1985, the band released the single "For Today", which reached number 3 in the New Zealand singles chart, and has subsequently been described an "alternative national anthem". Black and Nick Sampson won the 1985 APRA Silver Scroll for the song, but the group disbanded not long after.

== Legal and music industry career ==
In 1986, Black joined Auckland law firm Russell McVeagh, before returning to the University of Otago three years later to study for a master's degree and work as a lecturer. He also ran a music consultancy and began representing bands including Straitjacket Fits, The Chills, and The Verlaines. Three years later, Black returned to Auckland, without having completed his master's, and established Sinclair Black, a specialist entertainment law firm, with Mick Sinclair in 1989. In 1996, Black joined Sony Music New Zealand as director of artist and repertoire after the departure of Paul Ellis, and worked with artists including Che Fu, Dave Dobbyn, and Bic Runga.

Black was involved in a review of NZ on Air in 2002, and in 2004 he set up Les Mills Music Licensing, supplying music for use in gyms in 80 countries. He left Sony in 2009 to work in artist management, and co-managed Crowded House and Neil Finn.

Black served on the APRA AMCOS board of directors.

== Later life and death ==
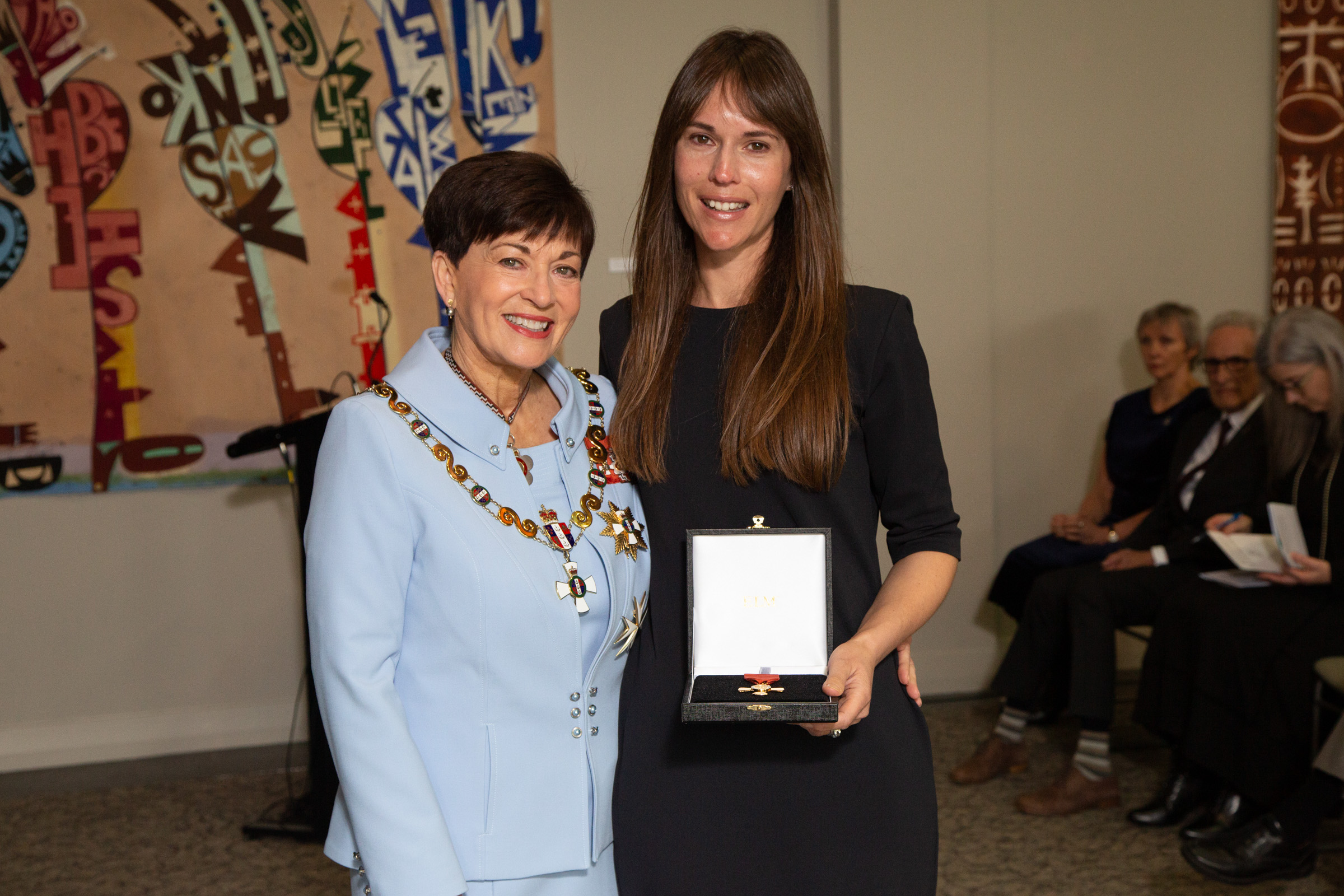
Julia Black (right) accepts the insignia of ONZM on behalf of her late husband, from the governor-general, Patsy Reddy, in September 2019

Black was diagnosed with bowel cancer after attending the 2017 APRA Silver Scroll Awards in Dunedin. In 2018, he performed "For Today" with a reformed Netherworld Dancing Toys at the APRA Silver Scrolls, and in 2019 he recorded an album, "Songs for My Family". In the 2019 New Year Honours, Black was appointed an Officer of the New Zealand Order of Merit, for services to the music industry. He died from bowel cancer in Auckland on 10 May 2019.
