= Dave Woodcock =

English footballer

Personal information
- Full name: David Keith Woodcock
- Date of birth: 13 October 1966 (age 60)
- Place of birth: Shardlow, England
- Height: 5 ft 11 in (1.80 m)
- Position: Midfielder

Youth career
- Sunderland

Senior career*
| Years | Team | Apps | (Gls) |
| 1984–1985 | Sunderland | 0 | (0) |
| 1985–1987 | Darlington | 27 | (2) |
- Newcastle Blue Star
| 19??–1992 | North Shields | | |
| 1992–199? | Bridlington Town | | |
- Bishop Auckland

Managerial career
- 1998–2007: Darlington Railway Athletic
- 200?–2009: Darlington Railway Athletic
- * Club domestic league appearances and goals

David Keith Woodcock (born 13 October 1966) is an English former footballer who made 27 appearances in the Football League playing as a midfielder for Darlington in the mid-1980s.

== Life and career ==
Woodcock was born in Shardlow, Derbyshire. He began his football career as an apprentice with Sunderland, but left the club without having played for the first-team, and signed for Darlington, newly promoted to the Football League Third Division, in August 1985. Over the next two seasons, he played 27 league matches, around half of which as a substitute, and scored twice. At the end of his second season, Darlington were relegated back to the Fourth Division, and Woodcock left.

He played non-league football for clubs including Newcastle Blue Star, North Shields, Bridlington Town, with whom he won the FA Vase and the Northern Premier League First Division title in 1993, and Bishop Auckland.

His playing career was ended by a badly broken leg in the mid-1990s, and he resumed working in football in 1998 as manager of Darlington Railway Athletic, where he stayed for ten of the next eleven years.
