= Aaradhna =

New Zealand singer, songwriter and recording artist

- Born: Aaradhna Jayantilal Patel; 27 October 1983 (age 43)
- Origin: Porirua, Wellington, New Zealand
- Genres: R&B, soul, pop
- Occupations: Singer, songwriter, record producer
- Instruments: Vocals, keyboard
- Years active: 2004–present
- Labels: Dawn Raid Entertainment, Republic Records

Aaradhna Jayantilal Patel (born 27 October 1983), known professionally as Rotrang, is a New Zealand singer, songwriter, and musical recording artist. She made her musical debut in 2004 featuring on the single "Getting Stronger" with the group Adeaze which peaked at number one on the official New Zealand Singles Chart.

== Early years ==
Aaradhna is a New Zealander of Samoan and Indian descent. Her father Jayanti Patel is an Indian from Navsari, Gujarat, India and her mother Sia'a Patel is Samoan from the villages of PapaSataua, Falealupo-uta & Auala. Aaradhna is the eldest of five. She first showed singing aspirations at the young age of 11, singing along with her mother to traditional Samoan and country songs. She would try to imitate the songs she heard in Bollywood movies that she and her father watched and also went to festivals that her father performed at. Aaradhna began writing her own music at the age of 11; she entered her first talent quest at the age of 13 making it into the finals. She joined the school choir at Porirua College had got kicked out for rebelling, but went on to form a five-piece girl group called "Lovera".

== Career ==
Her debut album I Love You, entered the top 20 RIANZ and has various songs featured on feature films including the top 5 single "They Don't Know" featuring New Zealand hip-hop star Savage on Sione's Wedding and had also had another feature on the movie It's a Free World with her original song "Faith". Aaradhna released a club-inspired song alongside Australian producer, DJ & artist Paul Mac in late 2006 titled Love Declaration. The song features on Mac's album Panic Room. In Australia the single reached No. 31 on the local charts.

=== 2008–present ===
Her album Sweet Soul Music, a throw-back to the soul classics including The Jackson 5 cover "I Want You Back" was released on iTunes and various music stores in New Zealand on 14 February 2008 coinciding with Valentine's Day.

In 2011 she began working on her third studio album under Dawn Raid Entertainment. She released the single "Wake Up" in August 2012, and the album Treble & Reverb was later released in November. It was a finalist for the 2013 Taite Music Prize.

Patel's fourth studio album titled Brown Girl was released in July 2016. The album explored her own experience of casual racism in New Zealand. The album debuted at number one in New Zealand and also cracked the albums chart of Switzerland. In November 2016, the performer gave away her hip-hop award at the 2016 New Zealand Music Awards, believing that she had "been placed in this category, because I'm brown". She opined that "you can't give a singer an award for Best Hip Hop artist".

== Discography ==
Aaradhna discography
- Studio albums: 4
- Soundtrack albums: 6
- Singles: 3
- Music videos: 7
- Featured singles: 9

=== Studio albums ===
Title	Details	Peak chart positions		Certifications
Title	Details	NZ	AUS	Certifications
I Love You	Released: 8 May 2006; Label: Dawn Raid Entertainment; Formats: CD, digital download	13	—	RMNZ: Gold
Sweet Soul Music	Released: 14 February 2008; Label: Dawn Raid Entertainment; Formats: CD, digital download	17	—	
Treble & Reverb	Released: 9 November 2012; Label: Dawn Raid Entertainment; Formats: CD, digital download	14	—	RMNZ: Platinum
Brown Girl	Released: 22 July 2016; Label: Dawn Raid Entertainment; Formats: CD, digital download	1	73	RMNZ: Platinum
Sweet Surrender	Released: 15 November 2024; Label: SIAATNT; Formats: Digital download	—	—	
"—" denotes an album that did not chart or was not released.

=== Singles ===
==== As lead artist ====
Title	Year	Chart Positions	Certifications	Album
Title	Year	NZ	Certifications	Album
"Down Time"	2006	3	RMNZ: 2× Platinum	I Love You
"I Love You Too"	2006	5	RMNZ: Platinum	I Love You
"Wake Up"	2012	12	RMNZ: Platinum	Treble & Reverb
"Lorena Bobbitt"	2012	—		Treble & Reverb
"Great Man"	2013	—		Treble & Reverb
"Brown Girl"	2016	— (Note: "Brown Girl" did not enter the NZ Top 40 Singles Chart, but peaked at number 3 on the NZ Heatseekers Singles Chart.)	RMNZ: Gold	Brown Girl
"She"	2023	—		Sweet Surrender
"Mango Tree"	2024	— (Note: "Mango Tree" did not enter the NZ Top 40 Singles Chart, but peaked at number 13 on the NZ Hot Singles Chart.)		Sweet Surrender
"—" denotes an album that did not chart or was not released.

==== As featured artist ====
Title	Year	Chart Positions	Certifications	Album
Title	Year	NZ	Certifications	Album
"Getting Stronger" (Adeaze featuring Aaradhna)	2004	1	RMNZ: 3× Platinum	Always and for Real
"They Don't Know" (Savage featuring Aaradhna)	2005	3	RMNZ: 6× Platinum	Moonshine
"Love Declaration" (Paul Mac featuring Aaradhna)	2005	—		Panic Room
"Spin1" (Che Fu featuring Aaradhna)	2006	20	RMNZ: Gold	Hi-Score - The Best Of Che Fu
"Turn It Around" (David Dallas featuring Aaradhna)	2009	—		Something Awesome
"With You in My Bed" (Isaac Aesili featuring Aaradhna and Buff1)	2009	—		Eye See
"Music (Makes the World Go Around)" (Frisko featuring Aaradhna)	2009	15		Non-album single
"Say Yeah" (P-Money featuring David Dallas and Aaradhna)	2010	—		Everything
"Like You" (Monsta featuring Aaradhna)	2011	—		Pacific Coast Highway
"Is That Enough" (Sons of Zion featuring Aaradhna)	2017	—	RMNZ: 2× Platinum	Vantage Point
"—" denotes an album that did not chart or was not released.

=== Other certified songs ===
Title	Year	Certifications	Album				
Title	Year	Certifications	Album	"Bring It On Home to Me"	2008	RMNZ: Gold	Sweet Soul Music
"I'm Not The Same"	2012	RMNZ: Gold	Treble & Reverb				
"Forever Love"	2016	RMNZ: 3× Platinum	Brown Girl				
