= Hook Up =

Single by Dawn Raid All-Stars
- Released: 2004
- Recorded: 2004
- Genre: Hip hop
- Label: Dawn Raid Entertainment

Savage singles chronology
| "Not Many - The Remix" (2003) | "Hook Up" (2004) | "Swing" (2005) |

"Hook Up" is a collaborative single by the artists signed under New Zealand record label Dawn Raid Entertainment under the name Dawn Raid All-Stars released in 2004.

The premise of the single was also to promote Boost Mobile and has been used as the background music for their advertisements.

== Track listing ==
1. "Hook Up"
2. "Hook Up" (Instrumental)
3. "Hook Up" (Video)

== Charts ==
| Chart (2004) | Peak Position |
|---|---|
| New Zealand (Recorded Music NZ) | 9 |
