= Adeaze =

New Zealand R&B/soul duo

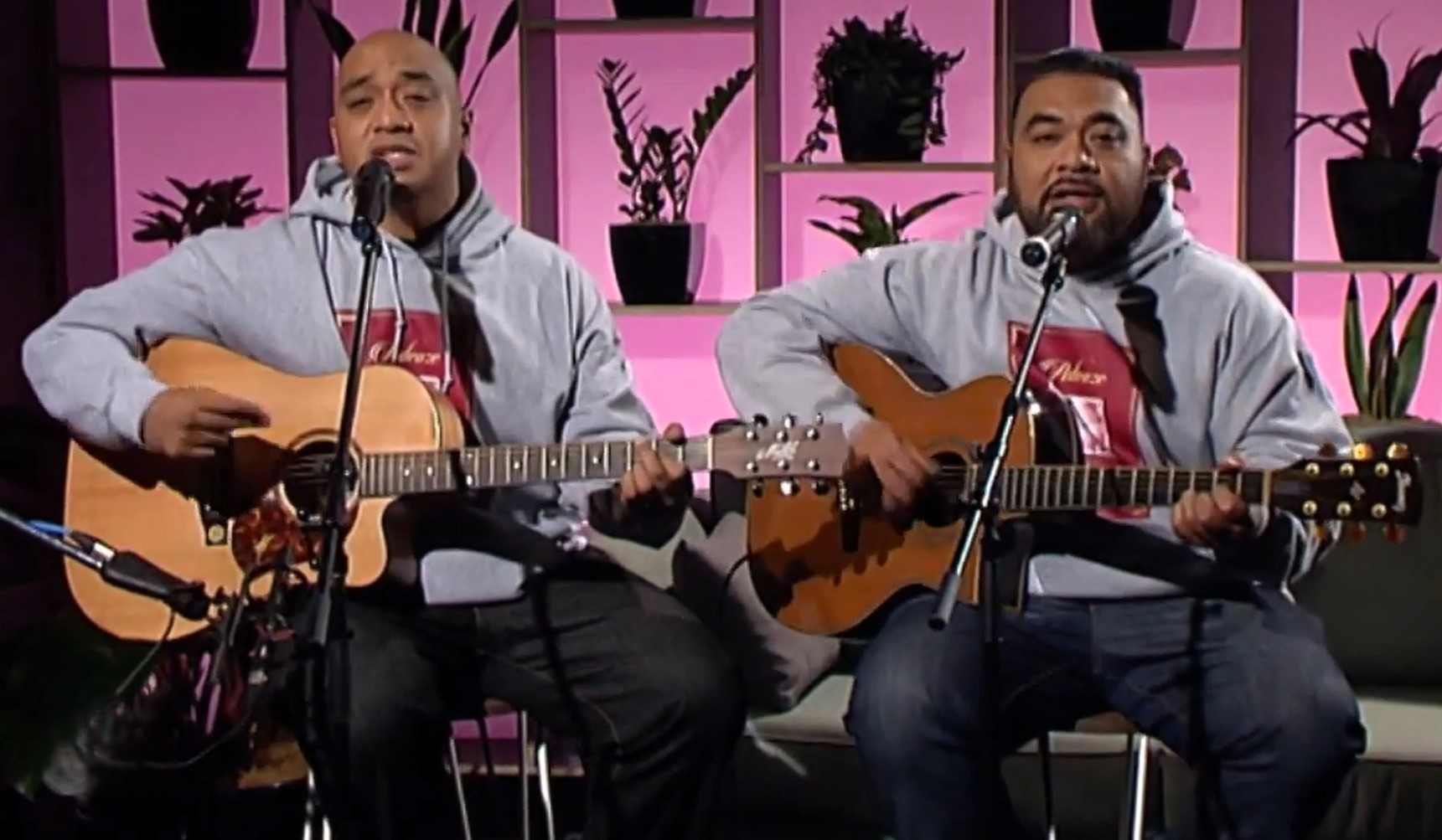
- Adeaze in 2018

Background information
- Origin: Auckland, Auckland Region, New Zealand
- Genres: R&B, reggaesoul
- Instruments: Guitar, vocals
- Years active: 2003–present
- Label: Dawn Raid Entertainment
- Members: Nainz Tupai; Viiz Tupai

Adeaze are a New Zealand R&B/soul duo of brothers Nainz and Viiz Tupai. The group's debut album, Always and for Real, was released in 2004 and topped the album chart in New Zealand.

== History ==
Brought up playing music in the church, the brothers used the time wisely crafting their skills with different instruments and live performance. Their passion for music continued and Adeaze performed eagerly at various church and school functions, during their adolescent years. The brothers attended Mangere College in Auckland New Zealand with a quick stint at Otahuhu College. In 1999 the brothers attended Excel School of Performing Arts and received Diplomas in Performance graduating at the top of the class, followed by a national tour of New Zealand with the students of Excel. The same year Adeaze caught the attention of Brotha D from Dawn Raid, who recognising the talent got the duo to record two songs for the upcoming compilation Southside Story (Dawn Raids Debut Album).

The duo released their debut album Always and for Real in 2004, which includes the number-one hit "Getting Stronger", their cover version of Bee Gees's song "How Deep Is Your Love", and "A Life with You"—which is sampled for Mariah Carey's "Your Girl" from the 2005 album, The Emancipation of Mimi. The album reached the number one position on the New Zealand album charts in 2004.

Then the duo released the second album, Rise and Shine, in 2011.

In a May 2008 Rip It Up interview, Former New Zealand Prime Minister Helen Clark stated Adeaze were her favourite New Zealand music group.

== Discography ==
Adeaze discography
- Studio albums: 1
- Singles: 4
- Music videos: 2
- Featured singles: 1

=== Studio albums ===
Title	Album details	Peak chart positions	Certifications
Title	Album details	NZ	Certifications
Always and for Real	Released: 3 May 2004; Label: Dawn Raid Entertainment; Format: CD, digital download	1	NZ: 3× Platinum
Rise and Shine	Released: 2011	—	

=== Singles ===
Title	Year	Peak Chart Positions	Certifications	Album
Title	Year	NZ	Certifications	Album
"A Life With You"	2003	3		Non-album singles
"Hook Up" (with Dawn Raid All-Stars)	2004	9		Non-album singles
"How Deep Is Your Love"	2004	—	RMNZ: Platinum	Always and for Real
"Getting Stronger" (featuring Aaradhna)	2004	1	RMNZ: 3× Platinum	Always and for Real
"Tears in Heaven"	2004	—		Always and for Real
"—" denotes releases that did not chart or were not released in that country.

=== Other certified songs ===
Title	Year	Certifications	Album
"Memory Lane"	2004	RMNZ: 2× Platinum	Always and for Real
