= Tha Feelstyle =

- Born: Kas Futialo; Samoa
- Origin: Auckland, New Zealand
- Genre: Hip hop
- Years active: 1987–present
- Label: Festival Mushroom Records
- Website: www.facebook.com/pages/THA-FEELSTYLE/118823123469

Kas Futialo, known by the stage name Tha Feelstyle, is a New Zealand hip hop artist of Samoan descent. His first album was Break It To Pieces in 2004. Tha Feelstyle was born in Samoa and moved to New Zealand in the 1980s. He raps in English as well as the Samoan language.

== History ==
Tha Feelstyle entered his first rap competition in 1987 and under the name of RIQ was part of the Wellington hip hop duo Rough Opinion with Samoan rapper K.O.S. In the 1990s, he was a member of The Overstayers which included King Kapisi and DJ Raw (aka Ian Seumanu). He has also worked with Andy Morton (aka The Submariner) an experienced producer in Auckland who has worked with various New Zealand artists including King Kapisi and Che Fu. The music video for Tha Feelystyle's award-winning single Suamalie/Ain't Mad at You was filmed in Samoa and directed by New Zealand filmmaker Chris Graham, the director of feature film Sione's Wedding. The track also featured in the movie. In 2009, Tha Feelstyle toured New Zealand with King Kapisi. In 2008, Tha Feelstyle released the Samoan-language album Lokokasi. In March 2011, he released his third album Good Morning Samoa, at the Pasifika Festival. Good Morning Samoa was nominated for three awards at the 2012 Pacific Music Awards - for Best Pacific Male Artist, Best Pacific Language album, and Best Pacific Music Album.

== Awards ==
Year	Nominee / work	Award	Result
2005	Tha Feelstyle - Break It To Pieces	Pacific Music Awards - Best Pacific Male Artist	Won
2005	Tha Feelstyle - Break It To Pieces	Pacific Music Awards - Best Pacific Urban Artist	Won
2005	Kas Futialo and Ian Seumanu - "Su'amalie"	Pacific Music Awards - APRA Best Pacific Song	Won
2005	Kas Futialo, Andy Morton, Grant Osborne & Andrew B. White - Break It To Pieces (Tha Feelstyle)	New Zealand Music Awards - Best Album Cover	Won
2005	Tha Feelstyle – Break It To Pieces	New Zealand Music Awards - Breakthrough Artist of the Year	Nominated
2005	Tha Feelstyle – Break It To Pieces	New Zealand Music Awards - Best Urban/Hip Hop Album	Nominated
2012	Kas Futialo (aka Tha Feelstyle), Good Morning Samoa	New Zealand Music Awards - Best Pacific Music Album	Won
