= Mareko =

New Zealand hip hop artist

- Born: Mark Kolani Sagapolutele; 15 June 1981 (age 45)
- Origin: New Zealand
- Genre: Hip hop
- Occupations: Rapper; singer; songwriter
- Years active: 1996–present
- Label: Dawn Raid Entertainment

Mark Sagapolutele (born 15 June 1981), best known by his stage name Mareko, is a New Zealand hip hop recording artist from South Auckland.

== Career ==
Mareko's career began as a member of the Deceptikonz, a South Auckland rap crew. The group won accolades in 2001, receiving nominations for several New Zealand music awards. Mareko released a solo album, White Sunday, in 2003, which peaked at #4 in New Zealand. Two singles from the album hit the New Zealand singles charts that year: "Mareko (Here to Stay)" (#4) and "Stop, Drop and Roll" (#6; credited to Mareko feat. Deceptikonz). In 2006, Mareko returned to the charts with a guest appearance on Tha Feelstyle's #17 single, "I Do Believe (Tha Remix)".

== Discography ==
=== Albums ===
Year	Title	Details	Peak chart positions
Year	Title	Details	NZ
2003	White Sunday	Label: Dawn Raid Entertainment	4
2008	White Sunday 2: The Book of Mark	Label: Dawn Raid Entertainment	—
2022	Untitled: Act I (with Ricky Paul Muzik)	Label: Self-released	32
"—" denotes a recording that did not chart or was not released in that territory.

==== Mixtapes ====
- Mareko Is the Future (2003) Dawn Raid Entertainment

=== Singles ===
Year	Title	Peak chart positions	Album
Year	Title	NZ	Album
2003	"Mareko (Here to Stay)"	4	White Sunday
2003	"Stop, Drop and Roll" (feat. Deceptikonz)	6	White Sunday
2003	Street Rap	—	White Sunday
2006	"I Do Believe (Tha Remix)" (Tha Feelstyle feat. Mareko, Flowz, Lapi Mariner & Manuel Bundy)	17	Sione's Wedding soundtrack
2007	"Gotta Go"	—	White Sunday 2: The Book of Mark
2008	"Record of the Year"	—	White Sunday 2: The Book of Mark
2009	"Them Eyes"	39	White Sunday 2: The Book of Mark
"—" denotes a recording that did not chart or was not released in that territory.
