= Aotearoa Music Awards for Best Hip Hop Artist and Best Soul/RnB Artist =

Annual New Zealand music award

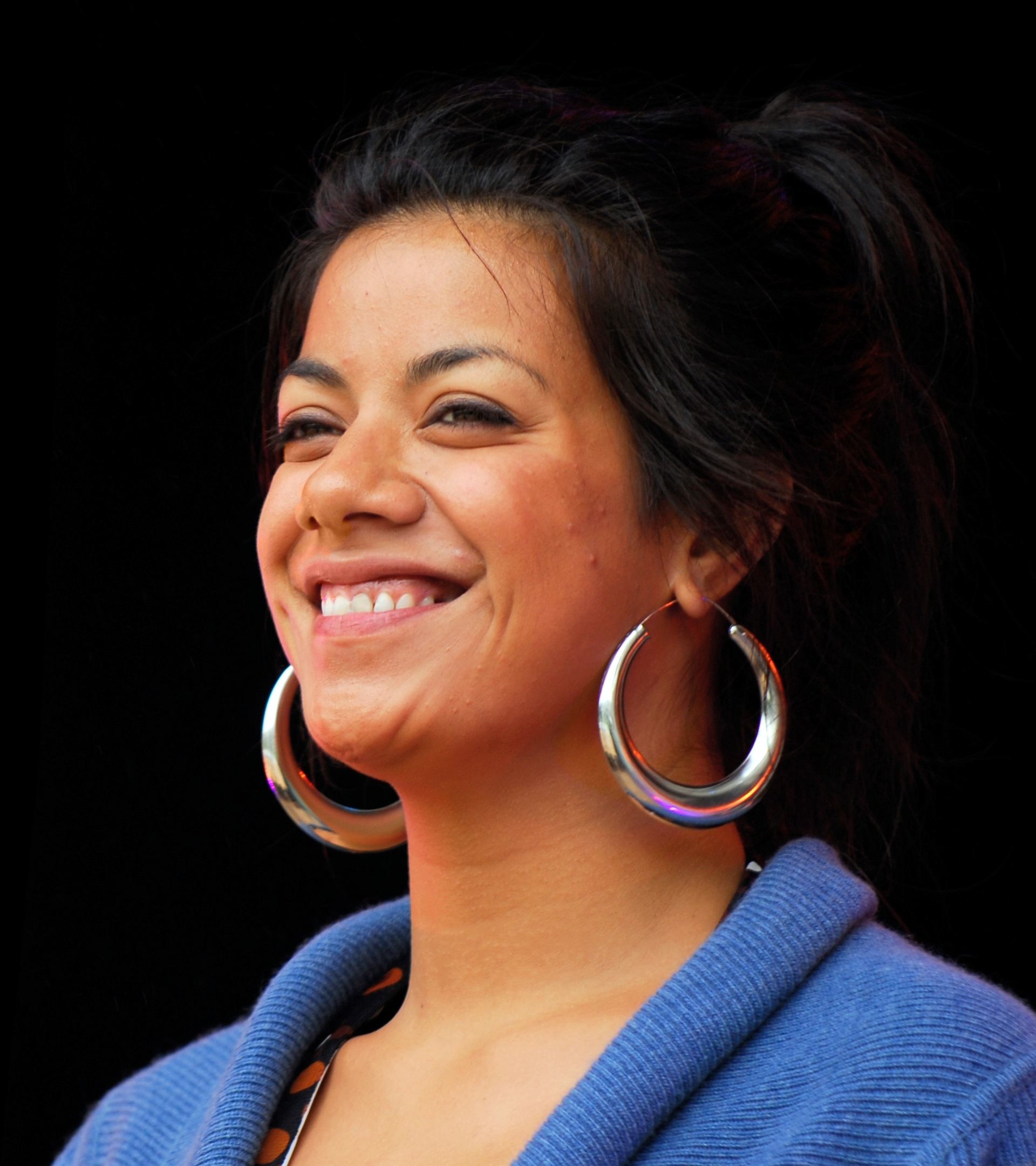
Ladi6 has won the award twice, for her albums Time Is Not Much and The Liberation Of....

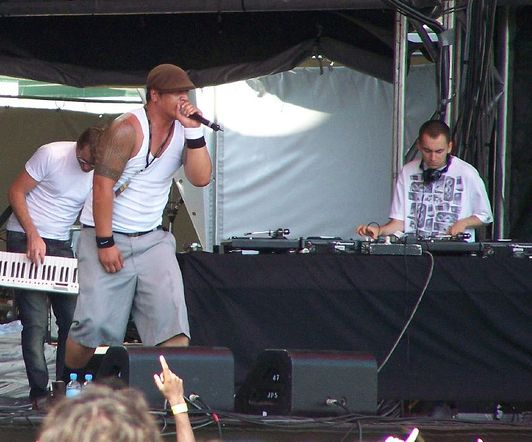
Scribe (centre) has won the award twice and P-Money (right) has won once.

Best Hip Hop Artist and Best Soul/RnB Artist are two Aotearoa Music Awards that honour New Zealand music artists for outstanding recordings of the genres of hip hop, and soul or R&B. The award was first awarded in 2002 as Best R&B/Hip Hop Album, and in 2003 it was called Best Urban Album. In 2004 it moved to Best Urban/Hip Hop Album. In 2017 the award was split into two separate awards: Best Hip Hop Artist and Best Soul/RnB Artist. The entry criteria were also changed to require either an album or a minimum of five single releases in the eligibility period.

== Controversy ==
In 2016, the award was presented to Aaradhna her album Brown Girl. She refused to accept the award, saying she felt the inclusion of both R&B music and hip hop in the same "urban" category was due to racial stereotyping and that she felt as a pop/R&B artist, she shouldn't be in the same category as hip hop acts. Aaradhna informally awarded the Tui to fellow nominee SWIDT for their album SmokeyGotBeatz Presents SWIDT vs EVERYBODY. Recorded Music NZ still lists Aaradhna as the winner of the category.

Recorded Music NZ CEO Damian Vaughan responded to the incident, saying that "urban" was an industry term used by New Zealand radio, but that the Urban/Hip Hop category would be reevaluated before the 2017 awards. As a result, the Best Urban/Hip Hop Album category was reevaluated ahead of the 2017 New Zealand Music Awards. The award was split into two genre categories: Best Hip Hop Artist and Best Soul/RnB Artist.

== Recipients ==
=== Best R&B/Hip Hop Album (2002) ===
Year	Winner	Album	Other finalists	Ref.
2002	Che Fu	Navigator	Dark Tower – Canterbury Drafts	

=== Best Urban Album (2003) ===
Year	Winner	Album	Other finalists	Ref.
2003	Nesian Mystik	Polysaturated	Deceptikonz – Elimination; P-Money – Big Things	

=== Best Urban/Hip Hop Album (2004 to 2016) ===
Year	Winner	Album	Other finalists	Ref.
2004	Scribe	The Crusader	King Kapisi – 2nd Round Testament; Mareko – White Sunday	
2005	P-Money	Magic City	Tha Feelstyle – Break It To Pieces; Savage – Moonshine	
2006	Frontline	Borrowed Time	Nesian Mystik – Freshmen; Opensouls – Kaleidoscope	
2007	PNC	Rookie Card	4 Corners – The Foundations; Deceptikonz – Heavy Rotation	
2008	Scribe	Rhyme Book	Mareko – White Sunday 2: The Book Of Mark; Young Sid – The Truth	
2009	Ladi6	Time Is Not Much	Savage – Savage Island; Smashproof – The Weekend	
2010	David Dallas	Something Awesome	J. Williams – Young Love; Young Sid – What Doesn't Kill Me...	
2011	Ladi6	The Liberation Of...	David Dallas – The Rose Tint; PNC – Man on Wire	
2012	Home Brew	Home Brew	Adeaze – Rise & Shine; Savage – Mayhem & Miracles	
2013	Aaradhna	Treble & Reverb	At Peace – Girl Songs; P-Money – Gratitude	
2014	David Dallas	Falling Into Place	Ladi6 - Automatic; PNC - The Codes	
2015	Janine and the Mixtape	XX	Diaz Grimm – Osiris; The Doqument– Black Canvas – Wall & Piece	
2016	Aaradhna (Note: While the 2016 award was formally awarded to Aaradhna for Brown Girl, she refused to accept it and informally presented it to fellow nominee SWIDT.)	Brown Girl	SWIDT – SmokeyGotBeatz Presents SWIDT vs EVERYBODY; PNC – The Luke Vailima EP	

=== Best Hip Hop Artist (2017 to current) ===
Year	Winner	Other finalists	Ref.
2017	SWIDT	David Dallas; Kings; SWIDT	

=== Best Soul/RnB Artist (2017 to current) ===
Year	Winner	Other finalists	Ref.
2017	TBA	Ladi6; Teeks; Tommy Nee	
