= Everything (P-Money album) =

Studio album by P-Money
- Released: 3 May 2010 (NZ); 18 June 2010 (AU)
- Recorded: 2008–09
- Genre: Pop rap; electronic music
- Length: 47:58
- Label: Dirty Records (NZ); Central Station (AU)
- Producer: Callum August (exec.); P-Money (also exec.)

P-Money chronology
Magic City (2004)	Everything (2010)	Gratitude (2013)

Singles from Everything
- 1. "Everything" Released: 2008

Everything is the third studio album by New Zealand music producer P-Money. It was released on 3 May 2010 in New Zealand and on 18 June 2010 in Australia on Central Station. Production was handled entirely by P-Money, who also served as executive producer together with Callum August. It features guest appearances from Vince Harder, Con Psy, PNC, Scribe, Aaradhna, Meryl Cassie, Mz J, and Milan Borich of Pluto.

The album peaked at number 25 on the NZ Official Top 40 Albums, and was nominated for 'Best Electronica Album' at the 2010 New Zealand Music Awards. It was supported by a hit single "Everything", which peaked at number one in New Zealand and was nominated for 'Single of the Year' at the 2009 New Zealand Music Awards.

== Track listing ==
No.	Title	Writer(s)	Length
1.	"Everything" (featuring Vince Harder)	Charles Vincent Harder; Peter James Wadams; Sam Luke Hansen	3:39
2.	"Say Yeah" (featuring David Dallas and Aaradhna)	David Keith Dallas; Aaradhna Jayantilal Patel; Wadams; Benjamin Regester	3:45
3.	"The Soul"	Wadams	4:01
4.	"Big Things Pt. 2" (featuring Scribe, PNC and David Dallas)	Jeshua Luafutu; Hansen; Dallas; Wadams	3:21
5.	"Falling Down" (featuring Milan Borich)	Milan Lovre Borich; Wadams	2:56
6.	"Weak" (featuring Vince Harder)	Harder; Wadams	3:17
7.	"Love Alone" (featuring Vince Harder)	Harder; Wadams; Regester	4:33
8.	"Dance with You" (featuring PNC, Vince Harder, Meryl Cassie and Mz J)	Hansen; Harder; Wadams	3:28
9.	"Greenlight" (featuring Scribe)	Luafutu; Wadams	3:17
10.	"Angels"	Wadams	3:48
11.	"Love Alone Remix" (featuring Vince Harder and David Dallas)	Harder; Dallas; Wadams; Regester	3:10
12.	"Everything Rap Remix" (featuring Scribe, David Dallas, PNC and Vince Harder)	Luafutu; Dallas; Hansen; Harder; Wadams	3:26
13.	"Everything (Blame Remix)" (featuring Vince Harder)	Harder; Wadams; Hansen	5:17
Total length:			47:58

Notes

- "Falling Down" is based on samples from "Silently Falling" by Chris Squire on his 1975 album Fish Out of Water

== Charts ==
Chart (2010)	Peak position
New Zealand Albums (RMNZ)	25
