= Something Awesome =

Studio album by David Dallas
- Released: September 19, 2009
- Recorded: 2008–2009
- Genre: Hip hop, Rap
- Label: Dirty Records
- Producer: P-Money, 41, Fire & Ice

David Dallas chronology
Something Now (2008)	Something Awesome (2009)	The Rose Tint (2011)

Singles from Something Awesome
- 1. "Indulge Me" Released: February 17, 2009; 2. "Big Time" Released: July 6, 2009; 3. "I Get The Feelin" Released: December 7, 2009

Something Awesome is the debut solo studio album by New Zealand rapper David Dallas, released on September 19, 2009. It is his first album following his work with Frontline under the stage name Con Psy.

Production was handled by Fire & Ice, 41 and P-Money. It features guest appearances from Aaradhna, PNC, Young Sid, Devolo, Niko & Jordache.

The album won 'Best Urban/Hip Hop Album' at the 2010 New Zealand Music Awards and was shortlisted for the inaugural Taite Music Prize.

== Release ==
The album was released on September 19, 2009, through Dirty Records, debuting at #20 on the New Zealand Albums Chart.

== Singles ==
The album's first official was "Indulge Me", featuring Devolo, released on 17 February, 2009. It peaked at #34 on the New Zealand Singles Chart, charting for 3 weeks.

The second single, "Big Time", was released on 6 July, 2009. It received a co-sign from Kanye West via his personal blog.

The third single, "I Get The Feelin" featuring Niko, was released on 7 December, 2009.

== Track listing ==
No.	Title	Producer(s)	Length
1.	"Big Time"	41	3:50
2.	"Front To Back"	Fire & Ice	3:34
3.	"Ain't None Left"	Fire & Ice	3:26
4.	"Indulge Me" (feat. Devolo)	Fire & Ice	3:09
5.	"Turn It Round" (feat. Aaradhna)	41	3:21
6.	"First Time" (feat. Young Sid, Jordache & Niko)	P-Money & 41	5:52
7.	"I Get The Feeling" (feat. Niko)	41	2:57
8.	"In The Mood" (feat. PNC)	Fire & Ice	3:58
9.	"Runaway"	41	3:12
10.	"Your Thing"	41	3:08
11.	"Slow Down"	Fire & Ice	4:14
12.	"Never Met"	Fire & Ice	3:22
13.	"Ever Ever (bonus track)"	P-Money	2:51

== Charts ==
Chart (2009)	Peak position
New Zealand Albums (RMNZ)	20
