= Bazooka Kid =

Studio album by PNC
- Released: 2009
- Genre: Hip hop
- Label: Dirty Records
- Producers: P-Money, Fire & Ice, 41, Official, Chris Laupama, Evan Short, Beat Kamp Muzic, JSquared, David Atai

Singles from Bazooka Kid
- 1. "Moonlight" Released: 17 December 2007; 2. "Find Me" Released: 28 April 2008; 3. "Take Me Home" Released: 1 September 2008; 4. "Tonight" Released: 4 May 2009; 5. "1/2 Kast" Released: 22 October 2009

Bazooka Kid is the second studio album by New Zealand rapper PNC. It was released on 2 June 2009.

== Critical reception ==
A review in Stuff described it as "the best local hip-hop album [they'd] heard since Che Fu and King Kapisi released their debuts; or at least since The [sic] Feelstyle.

== Track listing ==
No.	Title	Producer(s)	Length
1.	"Intro"	Fire & Ice	2:26
2.	"Bazooka's Theme"	41 & Evan Short	3:35
3.	"Find Me" (feat. Chong Nee)	Chris Laupama	3:59
4.	"Moonlight"	Official	3:09
5.	"What's up"	P-Money	2:51
6.	"V.S.O.P" (feat. David Dallas)	Beat Kamp Muzic	4:30
7.	"Gone" (feat. Che Fu)	Fire & Ice	4:59
8.	"Take Me Home" (feat. Mz J)	41	3:47
9.	"Tonight"	41	3:30
10.	"It Doesn't Matter"	JSquared	3:45
11.	"New Day" (feat. Tyra Hammond)	JSquared	4:45
12.	"1/2 Kast"	David Atai	3:47
