= The Rose Tint =

Studio album by David Dallas
- Released: 5 May 2011
- Recorded: 2010–11
- Genres: Hip hop; Rap
- Labels: Dirty Records, Duck Down Music, Dawn Raid Entertainment
- Producers: Dan "Exile" Mawby; Fire & Ice; 41; P-Money; M-Phazes

David Dallas chronology
Something Awesome (2009)	The Rose Tint (2011)	Falling into Place (2013)

Singles from The Rose Tint
- 1. "Take a Picture" Released: 25 July 2011

Professional ratings
Review scores
Source	Rating
The New Zealand Herald	4/5
XXL	4/5 (XL)

The Rose Tint is the second solo studio album by New Zealand rapper David Dallas. It was released as a free download via DatPiff on 5 May, 2011 through Duck Down Music, Dirty Management and Dawn Raid Entertainment. It serves as his first release since signing to New York City based record label Duck Down Music.

Production was handled by Fire & Ice, Dan "Exile" Mawby, 41, P-Money and M-Phazes. It features guest appearances from US rappers Buckshot, Freddie Gibbs, Tayyib Ali & Kid Daytona alongside New Zealand artists Che Fu, PNC, Pieter T and others.

The album was nominated for 'Album of the Year' and 'Best Urban/Hip Hop Album' at the 2011 New Zealand Music Awards, 'Best Pacific Music Album' at the 2012 Pacific Music Awards and shortlisted for the 2012 Taite Music Prize.

== Recording ==
In late 2010, Dallas signed with New York City based record label Duck Down Music, in a partnership deal with Dirty Records and Dawn Raid Entertainment and subsequently moved to New York. Dallas recorded material for the album while living in an apartment in Harlem with P-Money, collaborating with American rappers Buckshot, Freddie Gibbs, Tayyib Ali and Kid Daytona.

== Release ==
The album was released as a digital only free download on 5 May, 2011, via DatPiff. Dallas explained the rationale behind releasing the album as a free download: "that's ultimately what you need, you want people to hear it. You think, would you rather a thousand people heard it or would you rather sell it to one hundred?".

The album was downloaded more than 8,000 times within its first 24 hours of release and by November 2011 had been downloaded over 50,000 times.

A retail deluxe edition featuring four additional tracks, a new M-Phazes remix of "Til Tomorrow" and an additional Disc 2 containing instrumentals of all tracks was released on 8 November in North America and 14 November worldwide. It debuted at #3 on the New Zealand Albums Chart, becoming New Zealand's highest-selling hip hop album of 2011.

== Track listing ==
The Rose Tint
No.	Title	Writer(s)	Producer(s)	Length
1.	"Start Looking Around"	David Keith Dallas; Dan Mawby	Dan "Exile" Mawby	3:43
2.	"Say No More"	Dallas; Aaron Iose Iusitini; Jordan Mathew Iusitini	Fire & Ice	3:23
3.	"Take a Picture"	Dallas; A. Iusitini; J. Iusitini	Fire & Ice	3:52
4.	"Caught in a Daze" (featuring Freddie Gibbs)	Dallas; Fredrick Tipton; A. Iusitini; J. Iusitini	Fire & Ice	4:57
5.	"Nothing to Do (With You)" (featuring Pieter T)	Dallas; A. Iusitini; J. Iusitini	Fire & Ice	3:33
6.	"Life Is..." (Interlude)	Dallas; A. Iusitini; J. Iusitini	Fire & Ice	3:00
7.	"Til' Tomorrow" (Remix)	Dallas; Mark Landon	M-Phazes	3:20
8.	"Ain't Perfect" (featuring Jordache)	Dallas; A. Iusitini; J. Iusitini	Fire & Ice	4:05
9.	"Sideline" (featuring Che Fu)	Dallas; A. Iusitini; J. Iusitini	Fire & Ice	3:50
10.	"Dream"	Dallas; Nick MacLaren	41	3:42
11.	"Postcard"	Dallas; A. Iusitini; J. Iusitini	Fire & Ice	4:12
12.	"Make Up" (featuring PNC)	Dallas; Sam Hansen; Peter Wadams	P-Money	3:39
13.	"Ain't Coming Down" (featuring Buckshot)	Dallas; Kenyatta Blake; A. Iusitini; J. Iusitini	Fire & Ice	4:01

The Rose Tint: Deluxe Edition
No.	Title	Writer(s)	Producer(s)	Length
14.	"Feel Like Oasis" (featuring Tayyib Ali & Kid Daytona)	Dallas; Tayyib Ali; Austin Donawa; A. Iusitini; J. Iusitini	Fire & Ice	5:11
15.	"Not Enough" (featuring Jordache)	Dallas; A. Iusitini; J. Iusitini	Fire & Ice	3:46
16.	"10 Foot Tall"	Dallas; A. Iusitini; J. Iusitini	Fire & Ice	3:25
17.	"Couldn't Walk a Mile"	Dallas; A. Iusitini; J. Iusitini	Fire & Ice	3:25

The Rose Tint: Deluxe Edition (Disc 2)
No.	Title	Length
18.	"Start Looking Around" (Instrumental)	3:43
19.	"Say No More" (Instrumental)	3:23
20.	"Take a Picture" (Instrumental)	3:52
21.	"Caught in a Daze" (Instrumental)	4:57
22.	"Nothing to Do (With You)" (Instrumental)	3:33
23.	"Life Is... (Interlude)" (Instrumental)	3:00
24.	"Ain't Perfect" (Instrumental)	4:05
25.	"Sideline" (Instrumental)	3:50
26.	"Dream" (Instrumental)	3:42
27.	"Postcard" (Instrumental)	4:12
28.	"Make Up" (Instrumental)	3:39
Total length:		1:47:24

Notes

- There are two versions of the album's seventh track: the original version of "Til' Tomorrow" appears on the standard version, while the M-Phazes-produced version appears as "Til' Tomorrow (Remix)" on the deluxe version.

Sample credits

- Track 3 contains an interpolation from "Saturate" written by Thomas Rowlands and Edmund Simons and performed by The Chemical Brothers.

== Charts ==
Chart (2011)	Peak position
New Zealand Albums (RMNZ)	3

== Release history ==
Release dates and formats for The Rose Tint
Region	Date	Format	Edition	Label	Ref.
Worldwide	5 May 2011	Digital download	Standard	Dirty, Duck Down, Dawn Raid	
North America	8 November 2011	CD, Digital download	Deluxe	Dirty, Duck Down, Dawn Raid	
Various	14 November 2011	CD, Digital download	Deluxe	Dirty, Duck Down, Dawn Raid	
