= Man on Wire (album) =

Studio album by PNC
- Genre: Hip hop
- Label: Dirty Records
- Producer: Fire & Ice, Forty One

Singles from Man on Wire
- 1. "Let Your Lover Know"; 2. "Murderer"; 3. "That Kinda Guy"

Man On Wire is the third studio album by New Zealand rapper PNC. It was released on April 18, 2011.

== Track listing ==
No.	Title	Producer(s)	Length
1.	"Intro"	Fire & Ice
2.	"Murderer"	Fire & Ice
3.	"Let Your Lover Know" (featuring The Checks)	Forty One
4.	"Champagne Gang" (featuring David Dallas)	Fire & Ice
5.	"That Kinda Guy"	Forty One
6.	"She Got It" (featuring Te Awanui Reeder)	Forty One
7.	"Be with You" (featuring Vince Harder)	Forty One
8.	"Smile" (featuring Joe London)	Fire & Ice
9.	"Slow Motion" (featuring Homebrew & Jordache)	Fire & Ice
10.	"Another Night"	Forty One
11.	"The Flame" (featuring Jessie Gurunathan)	Forty One
12.	"I Want It All"	Fire & Ice
