= Backpack Travels =

BackPack Travels

Studio album by Buckshot & P-Money
- Released: June 24, 2014
- Genre: Hip-hop
- Length: 30:05
- Label: Dawn Raid; Dirty; Duck Down
- Producer: Andy Murnane (exec.); Buckshot (exec.); Callum August (exec.); Drew "Dru-Ha" Friedman (exec.); P-Money (also exec.)

Buckshot chronology
The Solution (2012)	BackPack Travels (2014)	Rise of da Moon (2019)

P-Money chronology
Gratitude (2013)	BackPack Travels (2014)

Professional ratings
Review scores
Source	Rating
HipHopDX	3.5/5
The New Zealand Herald	4/5 stars
RapReviews	7.5/10

BackPack Travels is a collaborative album by American rapper Buckshot and New Zealand music producer P-Money. It was released on June 24, 2014, via Dawn Raid Entertainment/Dirty Records/Duck Down Music. Production was handled entirely by P-Money, who also served as executive producer together with Buckshot, Andy Murnane, Callum August and Drew "Dru-Ha" Friedman. It features guest appearances from Chelsea Reject, CJ Fly, David Dallas, Joey Bada$$, Raz Fresco, Steele and T'Nah Apex.

The album was supported by three music videos: "Flute", which was directed by Guy Blelloch and released on May 22, 2014, "Sweetest Thing", which was also directed by Blelloch and released on the same day with the album, and "Just Begun", which was released on August 14, 2014. The song "Killuminati" was previously included on P-Money's 2013 album Gratitude.

== Track listing ==
All music is composed by Peter 'P-Money' Wadams.

No.	Title	Writer(s)	Length
1.	"Crown Intro"	Kenyatta Blake; Peter James Wadams	1:40
2.	"Just Begun" (featuring Raz Fresco)	Blake; Rasquiz Johnson; Wadams	2:53
3.	"Flute" (featuring Joey Bada$$ and CJ Fly)	Blake; Jo-Vaughn Virginie; Chaine Downer; Wadams	3:40
4.	"Sweetest Thing" (featuring T'nah Apex)	Blake; Christine Dorothy Alexandre; Wadams	3:26
5.	"Clear Light" (featuring Chelsea Reject)	Blake; Chelsea Alexander; Wadams	3:00
6.	"Red Alert"	Blake; Wadams	2:27
7.	"We In Here" (featuring David Dallas)	Blake; David Dallas; Wadams	3:18
8.	"Killuminati"	Blake; Wadams	3:22
9.	"The Choice"	Blake; Wadams	2:36
10.	"This Is My World" (featuring Steele)	Blake; Darrell Yates Jr.; Wadams	3:43
Total length:			30:05

== Charts ==
Chart (2014)	Peak position
New Zealand Albums (Top 20 NZ)	14
US Current Album Sales (Billboard)	197
US Top R&B/Hip-Hop Albums (Billboard)	34
US Top Rap Albums (Billboard)	19
US Heatseekers Albums (Billboard)	8
