= Borrowed Time (Frontline album) =

Studio album by Frontline
- Released: 31 October 2005
- Genre: Hip hop
- Length: 63:54
- Labels: Dirty Records; Warner Music
- Producer: Nick "41" McLaren

Frontline chronology
What You Expect? (2004)	Borrowed Time (2005)

Singles from Borrowed Time
- 1. "Breathe with Me" Released: 2005; 2. "Lost in Translation" Released: 3 July 2006

Borrowed Time is the first studio album by New Zealand hip hop duo Frontline (David "Con Psy" Dallas and Nick "41" McLaren). It was released on 31 October 2005 in New Zealand.

== Release and promotion ==
Borrowed Time was released in New Zealand by Dirty Records on 31 October 2005. Frontline embarked on the Line Em Up Tour, on which they performed in six New Zealand cities from 21 October 2005 to 11 November 2005, and were supported by P-Money, PNC and D-Form. The album was released to the United Kingdom 7digital store by Warner Music New Zealand on 18 March 2006.

"Breathe with Me" was released in 2005 as the first single from the album. It reached number sixteen on the New Zealand Singles Chart. "Lost in Translation", which features Charene, was released on 3 July 2006 and followed by tour of nine New Zealand cities from July to September 2006. Frontline were accompanied on the tour by PNC, DForm, Louie Knuxx and Charene. "Lost in Translation" reached number twenty-two on the New Zealand Singles Chart.

== Reception ==
Gareth Shute of NZ Musician praised Con Psy's "snappy punchlines" on the album. A panel of music journalists from The New Zealand Herald picked Borrowed Time as the fourteenth-best album of 2005. At the 2006 New Zealand Music Awards, Borrowed Time was nominated in the category of Breakthrough Artist of the Year, and won Best Urban/Hip Hop Album.

Borrowed Time entered the New Zealand Albums Chart at number twenty-seven on 7 November 2005, and fell off the chart the following week.

== Track listing ==
1. "Borrowed Time" - 0:55
2. "Ready" - 4:15
3. "Breathe with Me" - 3:53
4. "Lost in Translation" - 5:59
5. "What Was You Thinkin?" - 4:02
6. "Gonna Get It" - 3:42
7. "Screw Loose" - 4:57
8. "Onto Something" - 3:49
9. "Hold'em" - 3:26
10. "Please Go" - 4:11
11. "Night Time" - 4:47
12. "We Ain't Done" - 3:45
13. "Routine" - 4:15
14. "Walk with You" - 6:16
15. "Time Is Now" - 5:42
