= Frontline (band) =

New Zealand hip hop music group

- Origin: Auckland, New Zealand
- Genre: Hip Hop
- Label: Dirty Records
- Members: David Dallas; Nick "41" MacLaren

Frontline are a New Zealand hip hop music group formed in 2001.

== History ==
Frontline is a two-man hip hop team: Samoan-European MC David Dallas (also known as Con Psy) and producer and DJ Nick Maclaren DJ 41:30. Con Psy won the 2003 Auckland MC Battle for Supremacy, and 41 has won the 2000 Auckland ITF Championships.

After meeting in 2001 in Auckland, the pair formed some tracks together and released a mixtape, What You Expect?. During this time Maclaren produced tracks for artists including the Deceptikonz and Mareko, while Dallas completed a BSc in computing. Without any formal broadcasting or distribution, the mixtape sold over 1000 copies.

The duo hooked up with premier New Zealand DJ P Money (also known as Peter Wadams). He signed Frontline to his co-owned record label, Dirty Records. He then offered Dallas' skills to Scribe's multi#1 single "Not Many-The Remix!" featured on Scribe's five times platinum album The Crusader.

In 2004, P-Money's second album, Magic City, saw three appearances by Dallas: "Get Up Slow", "Get Back" (also featuring Dirty Records labelmate PNC) and "321 Remix" (also featuring Skillz and PNC). He also appears on the Breakin Wreckwordz mixtapes Breakin Wreckwordz Vol 1. and Fuck Music, Sirvere's Major Flavours collective and Breakinwreck artist Louie Knuxx's album Wasted Youth. 41 produced PNC's mixtape Ohhhhh On The PNC Tip.

Frontline released their debut studio album Borrowed Time in October 2005. The album has produced the singles "Breathe With Me", "What 'Was You Thinkin'", "Hold 'Em" and "Lost In Translation".

In February 2006 Frontline supported 50 Cent and G-Unit on their NZ Tour. In March 2006, Frontline and P-Money opened for Linkin Park's Mike Shinoda and his side-project/band Fort Minor at the Australia and New Zealand shows.

Frontline went on to win Best Hip Hop / Urban Album at the 2006 New Zealand Music Awards for Borrowed Time.

== Discography ==
=== Albums ===
==== Studio albums ====
Date of release	Title	Label	Charted	Country	Catalog number
2005	Borrowed Time	Dirty Records	26		

==== Mixtapes ====
Date of release	Title
2004	What You Expect

=== Singles ===
Year	Single	Album	NZ Singles Chart	Certification
	"Not Many The Remix*" (with Scribe and Savage)		#2(NZ)	-
	"Breathe with Me"		#16(NZ)	-
	"What Was You Thinkin'"		-	-
	"Hold 'Em"		-	-
2006	"Lost in Translation"		#21(NZ)	-
