= My Shit (Scribe song) =

Single by Scribe

from the album Rhyme Book
- Released: 11 August 2007
- Genre: Hip hop
- Length: 4:26
- Label: Dirty Records, Warner Music
- Songwriter: 10Aciouss
- Producer: 10Aciouss

Scribe singles chronology
"Dreaming" / "So Nice" (2004)	"My Shit" (2007)	"F.R.E.S.H." (2007)

"My Shit" is a song from Scribe's second studio album, Rhyme Book. It was the first single from the album in New Zealand, and the second in Australia. The song was released in both countries on 11 August 2007. The song's lyrics contain references to the end of the world.

== Critical reception ==
The Dominion Post's reviewer said that "My Shit" sounds "like an aural business card...[and]...a very weak version of 50 Cent". Jody Macgregor of Allmusic and Rebecca Barry from The New Zealand Herald called the song "a second-rate sequel to...'Not Many'", reusing its theme.

== Video ==
The music video for "My Shit" was directed by Chris Graham, and premiered on 12 August 2007 on New Zealand music channel C4. The video features many New Zealand celebrities and key locations of downtown Auckland, New Zealand. The end of the video features a short snippet of his second New Zealand release, "F.R.E.S.H.".

== Chart performance ==
"My Shit" debuted on the New Zealand Singles Chart at number six, rising to its peak position of number four two weeks later. It fell off the chart after a total of nine weeks.

== Track listing ==
CD single and Digital EP

1. "My Shit" (clean version)
2. "My Shit"
3. "My Shit" (instrumental)
4. "My Shit" (a cappella)

Digital download

1. "My Shit" – 4:26
