= Rookie Card (album) =

Studio album by PNC
- Genres: hip hop, rap
- Label: Dirty Records
- Producers: P-Money, Fire & Ice, 41, Official, Chong Nee

Singles from Rookie Card
- 1. "Just Roll"; 2. "P-N-Whoa"; 3. "Who Betta Than This"; 4. "Saturday Getaway"

Rookie Card is the debut studio album by New Zealand rapper PNC. It was released in New Zealand in 2006 and won best Hip Hop/Urban album in 2007 at the New Zealand Vodafone Music Awards.

The track "P-N-Woah" sampled The Staple Singers song, "This is Our Night", while "Just Roll" was made up almost entirely of quotes from 1990s songs.

== Track listing ==
No.	Title	Producer(s)	Length
1.	"Only Child Style"	Fire & Ice	3:39
2.	"Bomb!" (feat. P-Money)	P-Money	3:01
3.	"Stress Relief" (feat. Che Fu & Perceive)	41	5:13
4.	"Saturday Getaway" (feat. Awa (of Nesian Mystik))	Fire & Ice	3:57
5.	"Just Roll"	P-Money & Official	3:34
6.	"Who Betta Than This"	41	4:17
7.	"Dead Pioneers" (feat. Scribe)	Fire & Ice	4:24
8.	"Love Letter Interlude"	Fire & Ice	2:17
9.	"What I Do"	Fire & Ice	3:30
10.	"Miss You" (feat. Chong Nee)	41 & Chong Nee	4:22
11.	"P-N-Woah"	41	3:33
12.	"Memory Lane"	P-Money	4:17
13.	"The King"	P-Money	4:15
14.	"Dizzy" (feat. David Dallas)	41	7:26

== Sources ==
- Digirama.co.nz
