= Everything (P-Money song) =

Single by P-Money featuring Vince Harder

from the album Everything
- Released: September 2008
- Genre: R&B, soul
- Length: 3:39
- Label: Dirty
- Songwriters: P-Money; Vince Harder; S Hansen
- Producer: P-Money

P-Money singles chronology
"Stop the Music" (2003)	"Everything" (2008)	"Angels" (2009)

"Everything" is a single released by New Zealand music producer P-Money. It features vocals by Vince Harder. It was released to the UK market on 7 September 2009 on 3 Beat Blue.

== Release and chart performance ==
The single was released in New Zealand in September 2008 debuting at No. 40 on the RIANZ New Zealand Singles Chart, and peaked at No. 1 on 13 October. Vince Harder, the vocalist of the song, is known for portraying the lead role of Simba in the Australian version of The Lion King stage production.

The song was certified Gold in New Zealand with sales of 7,500+ after eight weeks and has currently spent 23 weeks on the chart.

== Music video ==
The music video was directed by Rebecca Gin and P-Money and was produced by Fish 'N' Clips.

The concept was that having music around is like having a 'shoulder buddy', and he feels like he has a friend, even if his real-life relationship failed to blossom. Unfortunately, his music player was stolen, taking his shoulder buddy away from him, and leaving P-Money alone in the middle of the alley with only his unplugged headphones on.

== Track listing ==
iTunes single

1. "Everything" (feat. Vince Harder) – 3:38
2. "Everything" (feat. Vince Harder) [Instrumental] – 3:38
3. "Everything" (feat. Vince Harder) [Acapella] – 3:20

iTunes Remixes EP

1. "Everything" (Rap Remix) [feat. Scribe, David Dallas, PNC & Vince Harder] – 3:28
2. "Everything" (Magik Johnson Vocal Mix) – 4:55
3. "Everything" (Magik Johnson Dub) – 5:44

== Charts ==
=== Weekly charts ===
Weekly chart performance for "Everything"
Chart (2008)	Peak position
Australia (ARIA)	85
New Zealand (Recorded Music NZ)	1
UK Singles (OCC)	138

=== Year-end charts ===
Year-end chart performance for "Everything"
Chart (2008)	Position
New Zealand (RIANZ)	11

== Certifications ==
Region	Certification	Certified units/sales
New Zealand (RMNZ)	3× Platinum	90,000^{‡}
^{‡} Sales+streaming figures based on certification alone.
