= Stand Up (Scribe song) =

Single by Scribe

from the album The Crusader
- A-side: "Not Many" (double A-side)
- Released: 2003
- Genre: Hip-hop
- Length: 4:14
- Label: Dirty Records
- Songwriters: Malo Luafutu, Peter Wadams

Scribe singles chronology
"Stand Up" / "Not Many" (2003)	"Not Many – The Remix!" / "Stand Up" (2003)	"Dreaming" / "So Nice" (2004)

Audio sample
- file; help

"Stand Up" is the debut single by New Zealand rapper Scribe, from his 2003 album, The Crusader. It was released as a double A-side with "Not Many".

== Critical reception ==
Russell Baillie from The New Zealand Herald said that "'Stand Up' is the sound of young New Zealand in 2003".

"Stand Up" won Single of the Year at the 2004 New Zealand Music Awards ('Tuis'), and was also a finalist for the Highest Selling New Zealand Single.

== Commercial reception ==
The song entered the New Zealand Singles Chart at number five, later peaking at the top spot. It sold over 1,000 copies in the week following its release. It spent a total of twelve weeks at number one, and became the top single of 2003. This is the most weeks at number one by a New Zealand artist, and the second most for any song, tied with Freddie Fender's "Wasted Days and Wasted Nights". During its run at number one, The Crusader was released and debuted at number one on the New Zealand Albums Chart. This was the first time in the charts' histories that a New Zealand artist simultaneously topped the singles and albums chart. In its tenth charting week, it was certified platinum.

In 2010, the list of the top 10 New Zealand singles of the 2000s (decade) was compiled. "Stand Up"/"Not Many" was the third best-selling single of the decade. Scribe was the only artist with two singles on the list, with "Stop the Music" listed at number nine.

== Music video ==
The music video for "Stand Up" was shot in Auckland, and directed by Chris Graham. New Zealand On Air and Dirty Records funded the production of the video.

A judging panel by Television New Zealand rated the video the fourth best New Zealand music video, calling it a "Kiwi classic" and "one of the turning points in the commercialisation and mainstream acceptance of local hip-hop." It won the C4 Best Music Video award at the New Zealand Music Awards.

== Track listing ==
CD single

1. "Stand Up" – 4:14
2. "Not Many" – 3:40
3. "Stand Up" (radio edit) – 3:40
4. "Stand Up" (instrumental) – 4:14
5. "Stand Up" (a cappella) – 2:57
6. "Stand Up" (video)

12" Vinyl

A-Side

1. "Not Many" (album version)
2. "Not Many" (instrumental)

B-Side

1. "Stand Up" (album version)
2. "Stand Up" (instrumental)

== Credits ==
- Chris Chetland – mixing
- P-Money – mixing, production
- Scribe – vocals
- Evan Short – guitar

Source: Discogs

== Charts ==
=== Year-end charts ===
Chart (2003)	Position
New Zealand (Recorded Music NZ)	1

== See also ==
- List of number-one singles from the 2000s (New Zealand)
