= Magic City (P-Money album) =

Studio album by P-Money
- Released: April 2004
- Genre: Hip hop
- Length: 59:34
- Label: Dirty
- Producer: Callum August (exec.); P-Money (also exec.)

P-Money chronology
Big Things (2001)	Magic City (2004)	Everything (2010)

Singles from Magic City
- 1. "Stop The Music" Released: October 2004; 2. "Keep On Callin'" Released: January 2005

Magic City is the second studio album by New Zealand music producer P-Money. It was released in late 2004 through Dirty Records with distribution via Festival Mushroom Records. Production was handled entirely by P-Money, who also served as executive producer together with Callum August. It features guest appearances from Con Psy, Scribe, Aasim, PNC, Skillz, Sauce Money, Jatis, Akon, Capone, Mystro, Roc Raida and Tyna.

The album debuted at number 2 on the NZ Official Top 40 Albums, and was certified Gold by the Recording Industry Association of New Zealand on the same day. On 20 December 2004 it was certified Platinum. In 2005, it won 'Best Hip Hop Release' at bNet NZ Music Awards and 'Best Urban Album' at RIANZ New Zealand Music Awards.

It was supported by singles: "Stop the Music" and "Keep on Callin'", which both went charted on the Official New Zealand Music Chart at number 1 and number 23, respectively. "Stop the Music" won 'Best Hip-Hop Single' at Australian Urban Music Awards in 2006.

== Track listing ==
No.	Title	Writer(s)	Length
1.	"Intro"		0:13
2.	"3,2,1" (featuring Skillz)	Donnie Lewis; Peter James Wadams	4:08
3.	"We! (Dem Ni99az)" (featuring Aasim and Capone)	Leroy Watson; Kiam Holley; Wadams	5:10
4.	"Keep on Callin'" (featuring Akon)	Aliaune Thiam; Wadams	3:33
5.	"Two Step" (featuring Jatis)	Antoine Raimon Rogers; Antonio Laray Sawyer; Wadams	4:08
6.	"I Had None" (featuring Mystro)	Kevin Amarfio; Wadams	2:59
7.	"Get Back" (featuring PNC and Con Psy)	Sam Luke Hansen; David Keith Dallas; Wadams	5:11
8.	"Represent" (featuring Roc Raida)	Wadams; Anthony Williams	2:09
9.	"Turn It Up" (featuring Tyna and Scribe)	Taina Rangi Keelan; Malo Ioane Luafutu; Wadams	3:52
10.	"Get Money" (Interlude)	Todd Eric Gaither; Wadams	0:24
11.	"Easy" (featuring Sauce Money)	Gaither; Wadams	3:40
12.	"Get Up Slow" (featuring Con Psy)	Dallas; Wadams	3:43
13.	"Anyway" (featuring Aasim and Bobby Creekwater)	Wadams	3:53
14.	"Driven" (featuring Scribe)	Luafutu; Wadams	4:15
15.	"Stop the Music" (featuring Scribe)	Luafutu; Wadams	5:09
16.	"3,2,1 Remix" (featuring PNC, Con Psy and Skillz)	Hansen; Dallas; Lewis; Wadams	5:03
Total length:			56:33

Bonus instrumental disc
No.	Title	Writer(s)	Length
17.	"Intro" (Instrumental)	Wadams
18.	"3,2,1" (Instrumental)	Wadams
19.	"We! (Dem Ni99az)" (Instrumental)	Wadams
20.	"Keep on Callin'" (Instrumental)	Wadams
21.	"Two Step" (Instrumental)	Wadams
22.	"I Had None" (Instrumental)	Wadams
23.	"Get Back" (Instrumental)	Wadams
24.	"Turn It Up" (Instrumental)	Wadams
25.	"Easy" (Instrumental)	Wadams
26.	"Get Up Slow" (Instrumental)	Wadams
27.	"Anyway" (Instrumental)	Wadams
28.	"Driven" (Instrumental)	Wadams
29.	"Stop the Music" (Instrumental)	Wadams

== Charts ==
Chart (2004)	Peak position
New Zealand Albums (RMNZ)	2

== Certifications ==
Region	Certification	Certified units/sales
New Zealand (RMNZ)	Platinum	15,000^{^}
^{^} Shipments figures based on certification alone.
