= Gratitude (P-Money album) =

Studio album by P-Money
- Released: 17 May 2013
- Genre: Hip hop
- Length: 38:43
- Labels: Dawn Raid; Dirty; Duck Down
- Producer: P-Money (also exec.)

P-Money chronology
Everything (2010)	Gratitude (2013)	Backpack Travels (2014)

Professional ratings
Review scores
Source	Rating
The New Zealand Herald	3/5

Gratitude is the fourth studio album by New Zealand record producer P-Money. It was released on 17 May 2013 through Dawn Raid Entertainment, Dirty Records and Duck Down Music. It features guest appearances from Nicole Wray, Aaradhna, At Peace, Blaison Maven, Buckshot, Buff1, Fashawn, Freddie Gibbs, Havoc, Like, MiBBs, Monsta G, M.O.P., Roc Marciano, Skyzoo, STS and Talib Kweli.

The album peaked at number twenty-three on the Official New Zealand Music Chart dated 27 May 2013. The following week it moved to number thirty-seven, and then fell off the chart. It has been nominated for Best Urban/Hip Hop Album at the 2013 New Zealand Music Awards, but lost to Aaradhna's Treble & Reverb.

It was supported by the lone single "Welcome to America", which was released on 26 February 2013 via SoundCloud as free download.

== Background and content ==
P-Money moved to New York City in June 2012 after signing a deal with American record label Duck Down Music. Working with a larger record label allowed him to select from wider range of guest vocalists for his tracks. On Gratitude, P-Money reverts to hip hop music, after the dance-oriented Everything (2010); he says it was inspired by the hip hop music he listened to growing up, and he was reminded of that music by Duck Down. Some tracks are R&B-influenced. The title was P-Money's "way of saying thank you to everyone who has ever offered a helping hand".

Gratitude features funk riffs and New York-influenced horn, keys and strings. A deluxe edition was later released, which includes a second disc with instrumental versions of all fifteen tracks.

== Track listing ==
No.	Title	Writer(s)	Length
1.	"Gratitude Intro"	Peter Wadams	0:34
2.	"Welcome to America" (featuring Skyzoo and Havoc)	Wadams; Gregory Taylor; Kejuan Muchita	3:13
3.	"The Hardest" (featuring M.O.P.)	Wadams; Eric Murray; Jamal Grinnage	3:04
4.	"Break It Down" (featuring Freddie Gibbs and Fashawn)	Wadams; Fredrick Tipton; Santiago Leyva	2:57
5.	"11th Break"	Wadams	0:36
6.	"Celebration Flow" (featuring Aaradhna and Talib Kweli)	Wadams; Aaradhna Patel; Talib Kweli Greene	4:37
7.	"Reminisce" (featuring Blaison Maiven)	Wadams; Nana Opong	3:41
8.	"Silver Beat"	Wadama	0:27
9.	"Say It Again" (featuring Monsta G, Like and MiBBs)	Wadams; D'Andre Lino; Gabriel Stevenson; Michael Stevenson	3:03
10.	"Killuminati" (featuring Buckshot)	Wadams; Kenyatta Blake	3:22
11.	"Honey" (featuring Nicole Wray and Buff1)	Wadams; Nicole Wray; Jamall Bufford	2:38
12.	"My Baby" (featuring STS and Nicole Wray)	Wadams; Wray; Don Carlos Price	3:07
13.	"I Know Interlude"	Wadams	0:34
14.	"The Professional" (featuring Roc Marciano)	Wadams; Rahkeim Meyers	2:41
15.	"Finding God" (featuring @Peace)	Wadams; Lui Tuiasau; Tom Scott	4:09
Total length:			38:43

== Charts ==
Chart (2013)	Peak position
New Zealand Albums (RMNZ)	23
New Zealand Albums (Top 20 NZ)	6
