= 4 Corners (group) =

New Zealand hip hop group

- Origin: Hamilton, New Zealand
- Genres: Hip-Hop
- Years active: 1998 - present
- Members: MC Hepaklyps; MC Koma; DJ Omega B

4 Corners is a New Zealand Hip-Hop group formed in 1998. Their songs On the Down Low and By My Side charted on New Zealand's top 40 in 2005 and 2006 respectively.

== History ==
The name 4 Corners originates from the 4 elements of the Hip Hop culture: MCing (rapping), DJing, breaking (breakdancing) and graffiti art (Graf). 4 Corners consists of two MC's, Koma and Hepaklypz, with DJ Omega B, and was formed in 1998 with members from different groups within Hamilton.

They were featured on P-Money's album "Big Things" & DJ Sir-Vere's Major Flavours 4 which has gone triple platinum. They also performed live on DJ Sir-Vere's set for the Missy Elliott concert. In January 2005 they filmed their first music video (In the game 4 life) in Wellington at the Bodyrock festival. At the start of 2006 4 Corners also made it into the Top 3 (over 70 bands entered) for the Coke Tunes competition to open the Edgefest 2006.

Since their formation 4 Corners have featured on various TV programmes like Coast and Tuhono on Maori Television as well as Mai Time and Space. They have also performed at events such as the bNet Awards (Akl), Big Day Out (Akl), NZ ITF Finals (Akl), Body Rock (Wgtn), Respect Festival (Wgtn), Aotearoa Hip Hop Summits (Chch & Akl), Beat Street (Ham), Orientation (Ham) Resolution (Whitianga), Coyote Tour (Tga & Wgtn), DMC DJ Comp (Wgtn), Reprezent (Akl), DJ Revolution (Chch). They have toured nationwide with Nesian Mystik and Misfits of Science.

They have also supported top NZ acts such as Che Fu, King Kapisi, P-Money, Deceptikonz, Footsouljahs, Frontline & Scribe on his stand up tour also guest appearances with Scribe at the De La Soul, Q-Bert & 50 Cent concerts.

In 2005, a partnership was formed with independent label Disruptiv Music to release 4 Corners debut album. The first single and video through Disruptiv, 'On the Downlow' was released at the end of 2005. This single charted on the NZ Top 40.

They completed their album in York Street Studios at the end of March 2006. The Foundations featuring Che Fu, Ladi 6, Tyra Hammond, Maia Rata and beats from P-Money, DJ Militia, Fire and Ice and DJ Ali. Sales on the album were less than expected.

In 2007 they were also nominated for best hip hop/urban album at the New Zealand Music Awards and their manager, Ayesha Kee, won Upcoming Manager of the Year - Regional at the NZ Music Managers’ Forum's Managers Awards for her work with the band. They were also the second foreign music act to perform in Laos after Danish rock act Michael Learns To Rock. Where they headlined the act and performed to about 10,000 people.

== Members ==
- MC Hepaklypz
- MC Koma
- DJ Omega B
- DJ Militia

== Discography ==
Date of Release	Title	Label	Charted	Country	Certification
2006, 2007	The Foundations	Grindin		New Zealand, Australia	
