= This Is Our Night (disambiguation) =

"This Is Our Night" is a 2009 song by Sakis Rouvas, or the Greek version "Pio Dinata".

This Is Our Night may also refer to:

- "This Is Our Night", song by The Staples Singers, Gary Goetzman & Mike Piccirillo 1984, also sampled on Rookie Card (album)
- "This Is Our Night", song by Anita Perras and Tim Taylor
- "This Is Our Night", song by Julee Cruise from The Voice of Love
- "Baby, Come Over (This Is Our Night)", song by Samantha Mumba
- "This Is Our Night", song by Isabel Pantoja on Cambiar Por Ti
- "This Is Our Night", song by Half Japanese from 1997 album Heaven Sent
