= Big Things (album) =

2002 album by P-Money

Studio album by P-Money
- Released: 17 March 2002
- Genre: Hip hop
- Length: 40:40
- Label: Dirty; Kog Transmissions
- Producer: P-Money

P-Money chronology
Big Things (2002)	Magic City (2004)

Singles from Big Things
- 1. "Big Things" Released: 2002

Big Things is the debut studio album by New Zealand music producer P-Money. It was released on 17 March 2002 through Dirty Records/Kog Transmissions. Produced entirely by P-Money, it features guest appearances from Scribe, 4 Corners, Unique, Che Fu, Deceptikonz, Patriarch, Hazaduz and Tyna.

The album peaked at number 7 on the NZ Official Top 40 Albums, and was certified Gold by the Recording Industry Association of New Zealand on 8 September 2008. It won 'Best Hip Hop Release' at bNet NZ Music Awards in 2002.

== Track listing ==
No.	Title	Length
1.	"Intro: Prelude to Big Things"	0:53
2.	"Scribe 2001" (featuring Scribe)	3:48
3.	"Touch Somethin'" (featuring Deceptikonz)	4:23
4.	"The Xpedition" (featuring 4 Corners)	3:31
5.	"Stay Dirty" (featuring Unique)	2:40
6.	"Gamble" (Interlude)	1:28
7.	"Synchronize Thoughts" (featuring 4 Corners and Scribe)	3:46
8.	"Big Things" (featuring Mareko, Patriarch, Koma, Hepaklypz, Hazaduz, Unique, Tyna, Savage, Che Fu and Scribe)	3:45
9.	"The Freshmaker" (featuring Scribe)	2:01
10.	"Remember?" (featuring Scribe)	4:58
11.	"Sunshine Remix" (featuring Scribe)	3:56
12.	"Outro"	1:20
13.	"Fade Away (P-Money Mix)" (featuring Che Fu)	4:11
Total length:		40:40

enhanced CD bonus videos
No.	Title	Length
14.	"Scribe 2001" (Video 1)
15.	"Synchronize Thoughts" (Video 2)

== Charts ==
Chart (2002–2003)	Peak position
New Zealand Albums (RMNZ)	7

== Big Things Instrumentals ==
Big Things Instrumental

Studio album Instrumental by P-Money
- Released: May 2003
- Genre: Instrumental hip hop
- Length: 47:39
- Label: Dirty; Kog Transmissions
- Producer: P-Money

P-Money chronology
Big Things Instrumental (2003)	Magic City Instrumentals (2005)

Professional ratings
Review scores
Source	Rating
The New Zealand Herald	4/5 stars

Big Things Instrumentals is the instrumental version of P-Money's first studio album Big Things. It was released in May 2003 through Dirty Records/Kog Transmissions.

=== Track listing ===
No.	Title	Length
1.	"Scribe 2001" (Instrumental)	3:48
2.	"Touch Somethin'" (Instrumental)	4:23
3.	"The Xpedition" (Instrumental)	3:29
4.	"Stay Dirty" (Instrumental)	2:40
5.	"Gamble" (Extended Version)	2:40
6.	"Synchronize Thoughts" (Instrumental)	3:44
7.	"Big Things" (Instrumental)	3:45
8.	"The Freshmaker" (Instrumental)	2:00
9.	"Remember?" (Instrumental)	4:56
10.	"Sunshine Remix" (Instrumental Remix)	3:57
11.	"Fade Away Remix" (Instrumental Remix)	4:10
12.	"Unique Will Get Ill" (Instrumental)	3:28
13.	"Sixteens" (Instrumental Edit)	1:27
14.	"God With the Flow" (Instrumental)	3:05
Total length:		47:39

Bonus tracks
No.	Title	Length
15.	"God With the Flow" (Aasim)
16.	"Sixteens" (Crud Luv & Crime Fam)
17.	"My Choice" (Tyna)
18.	"Sunshine (Original Mix)" (Scribe)
19.	"Touch Somethin' (DJ Shan Remix)" (featuring Deceptikonz)
20.	"Stay Dirty (Dubious Brothers Remix)" (featuring Unique)
21.	"Scribe 2001" (Ali Remix)

=== Charts ===
Chart (2003)	Peak position
New Zealand Albums (RMNZ)	26

== Certifications ==
Region	Certification	Certified units/sales
New Zealand (RMNZ)	Gold	7,500^{^}
^{^} Shipments figures based on certification alone.
