= Rhyme Book =

Studio album by Scribe
- Released: 29 September 2007
- Genre: Hip hop
- Length: 54:52
- Label: Dirty Records

Scribe chronology
| The Crusader (2003) | Rhyme Book (2007) |

Singles from Rhyme Book
- 1. "My Shit" Released: August 2007; 2. "F.R.E.S.H." Released: September 2007; 3. "Say It Again" Released: November 2007

Rhyme Book is the second studio album by New Zealand rapper Scribe. It follows on from his 2003 award-winning album, The Crusader. It was released on 29 September 2007.

== Background and release ==
In an interview with The New Zealand Herald's Scott Kara, Scribe said, "I really put a lot of thought into [Rhyme Book] and because I'd come from Scribe the rap star, I really wanted this album to be Scribe the dude next door. The real me rather than the guy on TV." Musically, he wanted to record "a lot of different kinds of songs so in a way there's something in there for everyone. It's like a box of chocolates." On Breakfast, Scribe said that "it's a good collection of...different types of hip hop...that's why I called it Rhyme Book because it kinda represents my rhyme book." He also wanted to show his growth and flexibility as an artist since The Crusader with different types of songs.

Dirty Records and Warner Music released the album in New Zealand and Australia on 29 September 2007.

== Critical reception ==
Rhyme Book
Review scores
| Source | Rating |
|---|---|
| Allmusic | 3.5/5 stars |
| The Dominion Post | 2/5 stars |
| The New Zealand Herald | 3/5 stars |

Rhyme Book received mixed reviews from critics. Allmusic's Jody Macgregor gave the album three-and-a-half out of five stars, describing it as "world-class, almost" because of a "few songs [that] hold Rhyme Book back from being a real classic". Rebecca Barry of The New Zealand Herald said that Rhyme Book was not of the same calibre as The Crusader, but called it "a quality album that exposes a more thoughtful scribe on Scribe". The reviewer from The Dominion Post was let down, and viewed the album as "a desperate attempt to be considered the Aotearoa version of Kanye West," and rated it two stars out of five."

Rhyme Book won the Best Pacific Male Artist Award at the 2008 Pacific Music Awards, and the award for Best Urban/Hip Hop Album at the 2008 New Zealand Music Awards. It was also nominated as the Album of the Year, losing to Flight of the Conchords' self-titled, debut album.

== Commercial reception ==
Rhyme Book debuted on the New Zealand Albums Chart at its peak position of number four, and spent a total of four weeks on the top forty chart. In Australia, the album debuted at number nine of the Australian Albums Chart, slipping to number eighteen the next week. After a total of four weeks in the top fifty, it fell off the chart.

== Track listing ==
| No. | Title | Producer | Length |
|---|---|---|---|
| 1. | "Jeremiah 1" | Fire & Ice | 3:23 |
| 2. | "Don't Look Back" | Fire & Ice | 4:41 |
| 3. | "My Shit" | 10Aciouss | 5:43 |
| 4. | "Champion" | 10Aciouss | 3:54 |
| 5. | "A.W.O.L." (featuring Ladi 6 and John Luafutu) | Unknown (Twice As Nice) | 3:39 |
| 6. | "Put Your Hand Up" (featuring PNC) | Nick '41' Maclaren | 5:25 |
| 7. | "Say It Again" (featuring Tyra Hammond) | Fire & Ice | 4:21 |
| 8. | "Let Me Ride" (featuring David Dallas) | Fire & Ice | 3:16 |
| 9. | "Babygirl" | 10Aciouss | 3:33 |
| 10. | "Be Alright" (featuring Talib Kweli) | Fire & Ice | 4:29 |
| 11. | "F.R.E.S.H." | 10Aciouss | 3:24 |
| 12. | "Rhymebook" | 10Aciouss | 5:12 |
| 13. | "The Return of the King" | DMAIN EVENT | 3:53 |
