= So Nice (Scribe song) =

Single by Scribe featuring Ladi 6

from the album The Crusader
- A-side: "Dreaming"
- Released: 2004
- Genre: Hip-hop
- Songwriter(s): Malo Luafutu, Peter Wadams

Scribe singles chronology
"Not Many – The Remix!" / "Stand Up" (2003)	"Dreaming"" / "So Nice" (2004)	"My Shit" (2007)

"So Nice" is a hip-hop song by New Zealand rapper Scribe. Featuring singer Ladi 6, the song was released as a double A-side with "Dreaming".

== Chart performance ==
"Dreaming"/"So Nice" debuted on the New Zealand Singles Chart at number forty-eight, rising to the top spot five weeks later. The song spent one week at number one, and slipped out of the chart after a total of twenty-one weeks.

== Track listing ==
1. "Dreaming"
2. "So Nice" (radio edit) [featuring Ladi 6]
3. "Dreaming" (instrumental)
4. "So Nice" (instrumental)
5. "So Nice" (a cappella) [featuring Ladi 6]

== Credits ==
- Chris Chetland – mixing
- Chris Macro – recording
- Chip Matthews - bass
- P-Money – mixing, production

Source:Discogs
