= Borrowed Time =

Borrowed Time may refer to:

== Music ==
- Borrowed Time (Diamond Head album), 1982
- Borrowed Time (Frontline album), 2005
- "Borrowed Time" (John Lennon song), 1984
- "Borrowed Time" (Styx song), 1979
- "Borrowed Time", song by AC/DC, a B-side of the single "Moneytalks"
- "Borrowed Time", song by Nicole from Make It Hot (album)

== Other media ==
- "Borrowed Time" (Dark Angel), a 2002 television episode
- "Borrowed Time" (Holby City), a 2001 television episode
- Borrowed Time (video game), a 1985 adventure game
- Borrowed Time (film), a 2016 short film directed by Pixar artist Andrew Coats and Lou Hamou-Lhadj

== See also ==
- On Borrowed Time, a 1939 film starring Lionel Barrymore
- On Borrowed Time, a 1937 novel by Lawrence Edward Watkin, basis for the film
