= Dreaming (Scribe song) =

Single by Scribe

from the album The Crusader
- A-side: "So Nice"
- Released: 2004
- Genre: Hip hop
- Length: 4:17
- Label: Dirty Records, Festival Mushroom Records
- Songwriters: Malo Luafutu, Peter Wadams
- Producer: P-Money

Scribe singles chronology
"Not Many – The Remix!" / "Stand Up" (2003)	"Dreaming" / "So Nice" (2004)	"My Shit" (2007)

"Dreaming" is the third single from Scribe's debut album, The Crusader. In New Zealand, it was released as a double A-side with "So Nice". Lyrically, the song is about Scribe's childhood aspirations. It had commercial success in New Zealand and Australia, appearing on the singles charts of both countries, and topping the former.

"Dreaming" was included on Pasifika - The Collection, compiled by the managers of the Pasifika Festival. The compilation album debuted at number one on the New Zealand Music Compilations Chart.

== Background ==
"Dreaming"
The beginning of the song's chorus with aspirational lyrics, creating an "autobiographical out-from-under theme".

According to Russell Baillie from The New Zealand Herald, the production of "Dreaming" by P-Money gives the song "a mix of askew soul-sweetness". "Dreaming" is about Scribe's childhood ambitions, which gives it an "autobiographical out-from-under theme...without sounding cliched or tryhard".

== Music video ==
The music video for "Dreaming" was directed by Chris Graham. Funding was provided by New Zealand On Air. It opens with shots of clouds moving across the sky in a time-lapse style, followed by Scribe writing a song, and later recording it. He then raps with friends in an urban area. The video is interspersed with childhood pictures of Scribe and others.

== Chart performance ==
"Dreaming"/"So Nice" debuted on the New Zealand Singles Chart at number forty-eight, rising to the top spot five weeks later. The song spent one week at number one, and slipped out of the chart after a total of twenty-one weeks.

In Australia, "Dreaming" debuted at number twenty-four on the Australian Singles Chart. It later peaked at number twenty-three, before falling off the chart after twelve weeks.

== Certifications ==
Region	Certification	Certified units/sales
New Zealand (RMNZ)	4× Platinum	120,000^{‡}
^{‡} Sales+streaming figures based on certification alone.

== Track listing ==
1. "Dreaming"
2. "So Nice" (radio edit) [featuring Ladi 6]
3. "Dreaming" (instrumental)
4. "So Nice" (instrumental)
5. "So Nice" (a cappella) [featuring Ladi 6]

== Credits ==
- Chris Chetland – mixing
- Chris Macro – recording
- P-Money – mixing, production

Source:Discogs

== See also ==
- List of number-one singles from the 2000s (New Zealand)
