= Vince Harder =

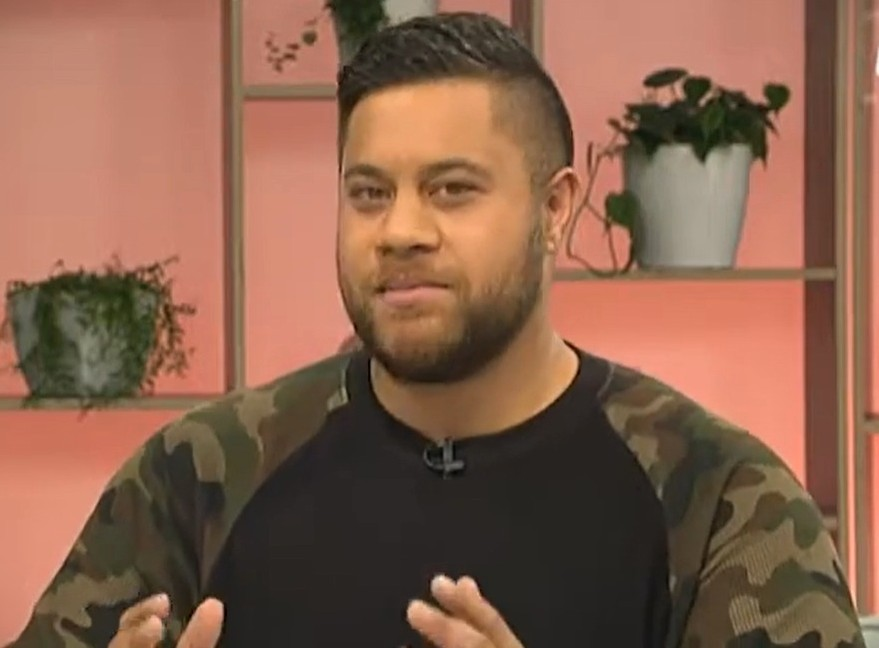
- Harder in 2016

Background information
- Born: Charles Vincent Harder; 9 April 1982 (age 44)
- Origin: Auckland, New Zealand
- Genres: Pop, R&B
- Instruments: Vocals
- Labels: Illegal Musik, Harder Music Group
- Website: www.vinceharder.com

Vince Harder (born Charles Vincent Harder; 9 April 1982) is a New Zealand R&B/pop recording artist and producer. He is most notable for the 2008 song "Everything" with P-Money, which reached number one in New Zealand on the New Zealand Singles Chart in 2008. In May 2010, he released the single "Say This With Me" which peaked at number 39 on the singles chart.

The latest album release by Harder is his fourth album HORIZON which he released in 2022.

== Early life ==
Vince was born and raised in West Auckland, New Zealand.

== Career ==
=== 2004–2008: Early career ===
In 2004, at the beginning of his career, Harder played the lead role as 'Simba' in the Australian stage production of The Lion King.

In 2005, he was the last contestant eliminated in the Australian TV version of The X Factor.

=== 2008–2010: Everything, early performances and single releases ===
In 2008, Harder was featured on the song "Everything", with New Zealand music producer P-Money. Harder was also a co-writer for the song. The song reached number one in New Zealand charts throughout 2008.

Harder was the main support slot on Teddy Riley's Blackstreet arena tour of Australia & New Zealand in 2009. Harder has also been a headline performer for New Zealand's Coca-Cola Christmas in the Park concerts in Christchurch and Auckland.

On 17 November 2008 he released his first solo single, "Strobelight", which he wrote and produced. In April 2009 he released a single named "Lyrical Love" which was a Top 20 hit in New Zealand. The video for "Lyrical Love" was filmed in various Auckland nightclubs.

=== 2011–2012: The Space Between Us and Titanium ===
In May 2010 for the first single on his debut album, he released "Say This With Me". Harder then released his debut album, The Space Between Us in 2011. The second single that he released for the album was, "I Want This Forever".

In 2012 he wrote and produced the number one hit song, "Come On Home" for New Zealand boy band sensation, Titanium.

=== 2013–present: Later career and releases ===
In 2015 he produced a new song named "Shot Me Down" which was a song on his 2016 EP release, Rare Vision. In 2016, Harder won best male artist, urban artist and best producer for Rare Vision at the 2016 Vodafone Pacific Music awards.

In 2018, Harder released another EP, Colours. This followed by his second album, Covers and Mash Ups Vol 1 which was released the same year.

On 18 October 2019 he performed halfway through the first day of the Downer Nines Rugby League World Cup in Australian city Parramatta.

In 2020, Harder released his third studio album, Visions.

In 2021, Harder was a panelist for the reboot of the 1990s New Zealand music reality TV show, Popstars. The same year Harder appeared on Stan Walkers 2021 album Te Arohanui. He also served as a co-writer and producer for the album.

His fourth studio album, Horizon (stylised as HORIZON) was released in 2022.

== Discography ==
Vince Harder discography
- Studio albums: 4
- Extended plays: 2
- Singles: 4
- Featured: 3

=== Albums ===
| Title | Details |
|---|---|
| The Space Between Us | Released: March 2011; Label: Illegal Music; Format: CD, digital download |
| Rare Vision (EP) | Released: 10 June 2016; Label: Harder Music Group |
| Colours (EP) | Released: 27 July 2018; Label: Harder Music Group; Format: CD, digital download |
| Covers and Mash Ups Vol 1 | Released: 14 December 2018; Label: Harder Music Group; Format: CD, digital download |
| Visions | Released: 24 April 2020; Label: Harder Music Group; Format: CD, digital download |
| Horizon (HORIZON) | Released: 2 December 2022; Label: Harder Music Group; Format: CD, digital download |

=== Singles ===
==== As lead artist ====
List of singles as lead artist, with selected chart positions, showing year released and album name
| Title | Year | Peak chart positions | Album |
| Title | Year | NZ | Album |
|---|---|---|---|
| "Say This with Me" | 2010 | 39 | The Space Between Us |
| "Not Gonna Let Go" | 2018 | — (Note: "Not Gonna Let Go" did not enter the NZ Top 40 Singles Chart, but peaked at number 29 on the NZ Hot Singles Chart.) | Colours |
| "Closer" (with Abby Lee) | 2021 | — (Note: "Closer" did not enter the NZ Top 40 Singles Chart, but peaked at number 39 on the NZ Hot Singles Chart.) | Non-album singles |
| "Love Will Find You" | 2022 | — (Note: "Love Will Find You" did not enter the NZ Top 40 Singles Chart, but peaked at number 38 on the NZ Hot Singles Chart.) | Non-album singles |
"—" denotes a recording that did not chart or was not released in that territory.

==== As featured artist ====
List of singles as featured artist, with selected chart positions and certifications, showing year released and album name
| Title | Year | Peak chart positions | Certifications | Album |
| Title | Year | NZ | Certifications | Album |
|---|---|---|---|---|
| "Everything" | 2008 | 1 | RMNZ: Platinum | Everything |
| "Love Alone" | 2009 | — | | Everything |
| "Far from Here" | 2012 | — | | non-album single |
"—" denotes a recording that did not chart or was not released in that territory.
