= The Crusader (album) =

Studio album by Scribe
- Released: 16 October 2003
- Genre: Hip hop
- Length: 45:30
- Label: Dirty Records
- Producer: P-Money

Scribe chronology
The Crusader (2003)	Rhyme Book (2007)

Singles from The Crusader
- 1. ""Stand Up"/"Not Many" Released: August 2003; 2. "Not Many – The Remix!"/"Stand Up" Released: December 2003; 3. "Dreaming"/"So Nice" Released: January 2004

The Crusader is the debut studio album by New Zealand rapper Scribe. Scribe recorded his debut album in 2003. Dirty Records released the album, with distribution through Festival Mushroom Records.

== Critical reception ==
Andrew Hughes of NZ Musician called The Crusader "undoubtedly the best NZ hip-hop album to date, consistent the whole way through".

The Crusader won Album of the Year, Best Urban/Hip-hop Album and Best Male Solo Artist at the New Zealand Music Awards in 2004.

== Commercial reception ==
The Crusader debuted at number one on the New Zealand Albums Chart, slipping to number two the next week. It spent a total of thirty weeks on the chart, eventually being certified five times platinum after having over 75,000 copies shipped. The week that the album entered the chart, "Stand Up"/"Not Many", the first single off the album, was number one on the New Zealand Singles Chart. This was the first time in the charts' histories that a New Zealand artist simultaneously topped the singles and albums chart.

In Australia, the album debuted on the Australian Albums Chart at number forty-four. Ten months later, it peaked at number twelve. It was certified platinum, shipping over 70,000 copies.

== Singles ==
All of the singles from the album were double A-sides. The first, "Stand Up/"Not Many", spent twelve weeks at number one on the New Zealand Singles Chart. It was certified double platinum. The second single was "Not Many – The Remix"/"Stand Up". It included a remix of "Not Many", and "Stand Up", and went to number two on the New Zealand Singles Chart. It also appeared on the Australian Singles Chart, peaking at number twenty-one. It later went gold in Australia. "Dreaming"/"So Nice" was the third single, and also topped the New Zealand Singles Chart. It peaked at number twenty-three on the Australian Singles Chart.

== Track listing ==
1. "Not Many" – 3:43
2. "Been This Way" – 3:37
3. "Dreaming" – 4:17
4. "My Lady" (P-Money remix) – 3:56
5. "The Crusader" – 2:32
6. "Scribe UnLTD" – 3:46
7. "Too Late" – 3:34
8. "Stronger" (featuring Tyna) – 3:41
9. "Stand Up" – 4:13
10. "Not Many – The Remix!" (featuring Savage and Con Psy) – 3:45
11. "So Nice" (featuring Ladi 6) – 4:45
12. "My Lady" (K.J.T. remix) – 3:41

Enhanced CD bonus
1. "Stand Up" (music video)
2. "Not Many – The Remix! (music video)

== Personnel ==
- Ali – production
- Chris Chetland – mixing
- JoJo – production
- Chip Matthews – bass
- P-Money – production
- Scribe – production, vocals
- Shan – production

Source:Discogs

== See also ==
- List of number-one albums in 2003 (New Zealand)
