= 2007 New Zealand Music Awards =

Annual New Zealand music awards ceremony

- Awarded for: Excellence in New Zealand music
- Sponsored by: Vodafone
- Date: 18 October 2007
- Location: Aotea Centre, Auckland
- Country: New Zealand
- Reward: Tui award trophy
- Website: http://www.nzmusicawards.co.nz

Television/radio coverage
- Network: C4

The 2007 New Zealand Music awards took place on 18 October at the Aotea Centre in Auckland, which also included the first inductee into the New Zealand Music Hall of Fame. A number of awards were presented at parallel ceremonies (the NZ Radio Awards, Technical Awards, Gold Guitar Awards, Pacific Music Awards, Auckland Folk Festival, and the Wellington International Jazz Festival).

Multiple winners on the night included The Mint Chicks with five awards (including guitarist Ruban Nielson's Best Cover), Hollie Smith with three awards and Evermore with two.

== Awards and nominees ==
Winners are listed first and highlighted in boldface.

Key
† – Non-technical award
‡ – Technical award

*Album of the Year†	Single of the Year†
**The Mint Chicks – Crazy? Yes! Dumb? No!**; Brooke Fraser – Albertine; Evermore – Real Life; Hollie Smith – Long Player; Opshop – Second Hand Planet	**Evermore – Light Surrounding You**; Brooke Fraser – Deciphering Me; Liam Finn – Second Chance; Opshop – Maybe; The Tutts – K
Best Group†	Best Male Solo Artist†
**The Mint Chicks – Crazy? Yes! Dumb? No!**; Evermore – Real Life; Opshop – Second Hand Planet	**Tim Finn – Imaginary Kingdom**; Paul McLaney – Edin; Greg Johnson – Anyone Can Say Goodbye
Best Female Solo Artist†	Breakthrough Artist of the Year†
**Hollie Smith – Long Player**; Brooke Fraser – Albertine; Hayley Westenra – Treasure	**Hollie Smith – Long Player**; Liam Finn – Second Chance; Atlas – Crawl
Highest Selling Nz Album†	Highest Selling Nz Single†
**Brooke Fraser – Albertine**	**Atlas – Crawl**
Radio Airplay Record of the Year†	Best Rock Album†
**Brooke Fraser – Deciphering Me**	**The Mint Chicks – Crazy? Yes! Dumb? No!**; Evermore -Real Life; Opshop – Second Hand Planet
Best Urban / Hip Hop Album†	Best Dance / Electronica Album†
**PNC – Rookie Card**; Deceptikonz – Heavy Rotation; 4 Corners – The Foundations	**Shapeshifter – Soulstice**; Bulletproof – Shake The Foundations; State of Mind – Take Control
Best Aotearoa Roots Album†	Best Music Video†
**Hollie Smith – Long Player**; The Black Seeds – Into The Dojo; Age Pryor – Shanks' Pony	**Sam Peacocke – Crazy?Yes!Dumb?No! (The Mint Chicks)**; Angus Sutherland & Liam Finn – Second Chance (Liam Finn); Stephen Tolfrey – Maybe (Opshop)
Peoples Choice Award†	International Achievement Award†
**Opshop**; Evermore; Brooke Fraser; The Black Seeds	**Evermore**
Outstanding Contribution to the Growth of NZ Music on Radio†	Best Producer‡
**Noel McIntosh – Bayrock** (Awarded at the NZ Radio Awards, April 2007)	**Jeremy Toy & Hollie Smith – Long Player (Hollie Smith)** (Presented at the Technical Awards on 12 September); Nick Roughan & Shayne Carter – "There My Dear" (Dimmer); Chris Nielson/ Kody Nielson /Ruban Nielson – "Crazy? Yes! Dumb? No!" (The Mint Chicks)
Best Engineer‡	Best Album Cover‡
**Chris van de Geer – Parlour Games (Revolver)**(Presented at the Technical Awards on 12 September); Clint Murphy – Second Hand Planet (Opshop); Mike Gibson – Long Player (Hollie Smith)	**Ruban Neilson – Crazy? Yes! Dumb? No! (The Mint Chicks)**(Presented at the Technical Awards on 12 September); Dylan Pharazyn – There My Dear (Dimmer); Tim Gummer – "View From Olympus" (John Psathas)
Best Classical Album†	Best Maori Album†
**John Psathas – View From Olympus**; New Zealand Symphony Orchestra and James Judd – Lilburn – Orchestral Works; Dame Kiri Te Kanawa – Kiri Sings Karl	**Richard Nunns & Hirini Melbourne – Te Whaiao: Te Ku Te Whe Remixed**; Adam Whauwhau – Tukuna Mai; Toi Hautu – Na Te Atua
Best Gospel / Christian Album†	Best Country Music Album†
**Rapture Ruckus – I Believe**; Magnify – Alive Within; Hannah Donald – Unfinished Journey	Presented at the Gold Guitar Awards, 1 June 2007: **Topp Twins – Flowergirls & Cowgirls**; Johnny Possums Good Time Hootin' Band – Tickets; Warren Love Band – Warren Love Band
Best Pacific Music Album†	Best Folk Album†
**Spacifix – Much Love** (Presented at the Pacific Music Awards, 31 May 2007); Vaniah Toloa – Tukua; Amene – In Your Name We Pray	**Ben The Hoose – The Little Cascade** (Presented at the Auckland Folk Festival, 26 – 29 January 2007); Bob Bickerton – The Likes of Us; The Warratahs – Keep On
Best Jazz Album†	Legacy Award†
**Charmaine Ford – Busy Silence** (Presented at the Wellington International Jazz Festival, 6 November 2007); Kevin Clark – Zahara; Whirimako Black – Soul Sessions	**Johnny Devlin**

== New Zealand Music Hall of Fame ==
This year was the first to include an award for the New Zealand Music Hall of Fame, a split award shared between RIANZ and APRA. The first inductee was Johnny Devlin.
