= Stop the Music (P-Money song) =

2003 single by P-Money & Scribe

Single by P-Money and Scribe

from the album Magic City
- Released: 2004
- Genre: Hip hop, Rap Rock
- Label: Dirty
- Songwriters: Peter James Wadams; Malo Ioane Luafutu; Sam Luke Hansen; Taina Rangi Keelan
- Producer: P-Money

P-Money singles chronology
"Stop the Music" (2004)	"Keep on Callin'" (2005)

Music video
- "Stop The Music" on YouTube

"Stop The Music" is a song by New Zealand music producer P-Money featuring fellow rapper Scribe. Written by Scribe, P-Money, Sam "PNC" Hansen and Taina "Tyna" Keelan, it was produced by P-Money. It was released as the lead single from P-Money's second studio album Magic City in late 2004 through Dirty Records with distribution via Festival Mushroom Records under exclusive license for the territories of Australia and New Zealand. The song peaked at number one in New Zealand, and was certified Platinum on 6 December 2004 by the Recording Industry Association of New Zealand. It also reached number seven in Australia, and won 'Best Hip-Hop Single' at the 2006 Australian Urban Music Awards. The track made use of samples of Jury by Trapeze.

== Track listing ==
No.	Title	Length
1.	"Stop the Music" (Radio Edit)	3:13
2.	"Stop the Music" (Album Version)	5:07
3.	"Stop the Music" (Instrumental)	5:07

== Personnel ==
- Peter "P-Money" Wadams – main artist, songwriter, producer
- Malo "Scribe" Luafutu – featured artist, songwriter
- Taina "Tyna" Keelan – guitar, songwriter
- Sam "PNC" Hansen – additional vocals, songwriter
- Oli Harmer – additional vocals

== Charts ==
=== Weekly charts ===
Chart (2004–2005)	Peak position
Australia (ARIA)	7
Australian Urban (ARIA)	5
New Zealand (Recorded Music NZ)	1

=== Year-end charts ===
Chart (2004)	Position
New Zealand (RIANZ)	12
Chart (2005)	Position
Australia (ARIA)	38

== Certifications ==
Region	Certification	Certified units/sales
Australia (ARIA)	Gold	35,000^{^}
New Zealand (RMNZ)	Platinum	10,000^{*}
^{*} Sales figures based on certification alone.^{^} Shipments figures based on certification alone.
