= Not Many =

Single by Scribe

from the album The Crusader
- A-side: "Stand Up"
- Released: 2003
- Recorded: 2003, Kog Transmissions, Auckland, New Zealand
- Genre: Hip-hop
- Length: 3:43 (original); 3:45 (remix)
- Label: Dirty Records, Festival Mushroom Records
- Songwriters: Scribe, P-Money
- Producer: P-Money

Scribe singles chronology
"Stand Up" / "Not Many" (2003)	"Not Many – The Remix!" / "Stand Up" (2003)	"Dreaming" / "So Nice" (2004)

Audio sample
- file; help

Remix cover

"Not Many" is a hip hop single by New Zealand rapper Scribe, taken from his debut album, The Crusader. It was released as a double A-side with "Stand Up".

== Background and recording ==
"Not Many" was written by Scribe and P-Money. Chip Matthews performed bass and P-Money produced the track. It was recorded by Chris Macro and mixed by Chris Chetland and P-Money at Kog Transmissions. According to P-Money, "Not Many" was recorded and mixed in less than six hours.

== Remix ==
A remix was released, titled "Not Many – The Remix!", featuring Savage and Con Psy. The remix went to number two on the New Zealand Singles Chart for two weeks, then slipped out of the chart. It also appeared on the Australian Singles Chart for twenty-eight weeks, peaking at number twenty-one. In Australia, the remix was certified gold. The song is the entrance theme song for Auckland-born MMA fighter, Dan Hooker. The song was also used by New Zealand NASCAR driver Shane van Gisbergen as his entrance music for the 2025 Bass Pro Shops Night Race.

== Reception ==
"Not Many" won the APRA Silver Scroll, an award for songwriting, at the 2004 ceremony. One of the judges said, "The winner was a stand-out, from the killer opening bars to the brattish bravado of the chorus." At the 2004 New Zealand Music Awards, "Not Many - The Remix!" won the Songwriter of the Year award.

The song entered the New Zealand Singles Chart at number five, later peaking at the top spot. It spent a total of twelve weeks at number one, and became the top single of 2003. During its run at number one, The Crusader was released, and debuted at number one on the New Zealand Albums Chart. This was the first time in the charts' histories that a New Zealand artist simultaneously topped the singles and albums chart. In its tenth charting week, it was certified platinum. It has since been certified double platinum, and sold over 20,000 copies.

In 2010, the list of the top 10 New Zealand singles of the 2000s (decade) was compiled. "Stand Up"/"Not Many" was the third best-selling single of the decade.

== Music video ==
No music video was shot for the original track, however one was made using the remix version of the song. The video was directed by Chris Graham. Savage and Con Psy appeared in the video.

In August 2011, following the Christchurch earthquake, the video was remade with Scribe travelling around the central city red zone and featuring host of residents' faces, including Mayor Bob Parker.

== Track listings ==
=== Original ===
CD single

1. "Stand Up" – 4:14
2. "Not Many" – 3:40
3. "Stand Up" (radio edit) – 3:40
4. "Stand Up" (instrumental) – 4:14
5. "Stand Up" (a cappella) – 2:57
6. "Stand Up" (video)

12" Vinyl

A-Side

1. "Not Many" (album version)
2. "Not Many" (instrumental)

B-Side

1. "Stand Up" (album version)
2. "Stand Up" (instrumental)

=== Remix ===
CD single

1. "Not Many" – The Remix
2. "Not Many" – The Remix (radio edit)
3. "Not Many"
4. "Not Many" (instrumental)
5. "Not Many" (a cappella)
6. "Stand Up" (album mix)

12" Vinyl

A-Side

1. "Not Many" – The Remix (album version)
2. "Not Many" – The Remix (instrumental)

B-Side

1. "Not Many" – The Remix (radio edit)
2. "Not Many" – The Remix (a cappella)

== Charts ==
=== Year-end charts ===
Chart (2003)	Position
New Zealand (Recorded Music NZ)	1

== Certifications ==
Region	Certification	Certified units/sales
New Zealand (RMNZ)	3× Platinum	90,000^{‡}
^{‡} Sales+streaming figures based on certification alone.

== Release history ==
Country	Version	Format	Date	Label
Australia	Remix	CD single	26 April 2004	Festival Records

== See also ==
- List of number-one singles from the 2000s (New Zealand)
