= F.R.E.S.H. =

Single by Scribe

from the album Rhyme Book
- Released: 8 September 2007
- Genre: Hip hop
- Length: 3:26
- Label: Dirty Records
- Songwriter(s): Malo Luafutu, Tenei Kesha
- Producer(s): 10Aciouss

Scribe singles chronology
"My Shit" (2007)	"F.R.E.S.H." (2007)	"Say It Again" (2008)

"F.R.E.S.H." was the second single released from Scribe's second studio solo album, Rhyme Book. It was released on 8 September 2007.

"F.R.E.S.H." stands for "Forever Rhyming Eternally Saving Hip hop".

== Composition ==
"F.R.E.S.H."
A sample of the song's chorus, with hoofbeats and heavy drums

"F.R.E.S.H." was written by Scribe and 10Aciouss. The song opens with horse hoofbeats, which producer 10Aciouss originally recorded from a horse travelling on cobblestones. It incorporates elements of southern hip hop, and uses echoing drums, dirty synth beats and a heavy bassline. Jody Macgregor of Allmusic noted the "F.R.E.S.H." as one of the highlights of Rhyme Book.

== Music video ==
The music video for "F.R.E.S.H" was directed by Chris Graham, who is mentioned in the song. In the first sixty seconds of the clip there are approximately 100 cuts used. At the end of the music video there is a short snippet of Scribe's previous single, "My Shit". This is similar to the end of the "My Shit" video which features a snippet of "F.R.E.S.H.".

== Chart performance ==
"F.R.E.S.H." debuted on the New Zealand Singles Chart at number twenty-five. In its eighth and final charting week, it peaked at number twenty-four. The song also appeared on the Australian Singles Chart, debuting and peaking at number thirty. It slipped off the chart after a total of seven weeks.

== Track listing ==
Digital EP

1. "F.R.E.S.H." - 3:26
2. "My Shit" - 4:26
3. "F.R.E.S.H." (instrumental) - 3:26
4. "F.R.E.S.H." (a cappella) - 2:49
5. "On My Way" (featuring Maia Rata) - 3:37
