= 2006 New Zealand Music Awards =

Annual New Zealand music awards ceremony

- Awarded for: Excellence in New Zealand music
- Date: 18 October 2006
- Location: Aotea Centre, Auckland
- Country: New Zealand
- Reward: Tui award trophy
- Website: http://www.nzmusicawards.co.nz

Television/radio coverage
- Network: C4

The 2006 New Zealand Music Awards took place on 18 October 2006 at the Aotea Centre in Auckland. The best Jazz album was presented at the New Zealand Jazz Festival in November.

Bic Runga, the Bleeders and Fat Freddy's Drop each won two awards each. Dave Dobbyn won his 15th award as a musical artist.

== Awards and nominees ==
The Maori Album awards were merged into one category.

Winners are listed first and highlighted in boldface.

Key
† – Non-technical award
‡ – Technical award

Album of the Year†	Single of the Year†
**Bic Runga – Birds**; Don McGlashan – Warm Hand; Dave Dobbyn – Available Light; Concord Dawn – Chaos By Design; Elemeno P – Trouble in Paradise	**Pluto – "Long White Cross"**; Bic Runga – "Winning Arrow"; Goldenhorse – "Out of the Moon"; Mt Raskil Preservation Society feat. Hollie Smith – "Bathe in the River"; The Feelers – "Stand Up"
Best Group†	Best Male Solo Artist†
**Elemeno P – Trouble in Paradise**; Bleeders - As Sweet As Sin; Fly My Pretties – The Return of Fly My Pretties	**Dave Dobbyn – Available Light**; Don McGlashan - Warm Hand; Che Fu – Beneath The Radar
Best Female Solo Artist†	Breakthrough Artist of the Year†
**Bic Runga – Birds**; Aaradhna – I Love You; Anika Moa – Stolen Hill	Bleeders – As Sweet As Sin; Aaradhna – I Love You; Frontline – Borrowed Time
Highest Selling NZ Album†	Highest Selling NZ Single†
**Fat Freddy's Drop – Based on a True Story**	**Rosita Vai – "All I Ask"**
Radio Airplay Record of the Year†	Best Rock Album†
**The Feelers – "Stand Up"**	Bleeders – **As Sweet As Sin**; Blindspott – End The Silence; Elemeno P – Trouble in Paradise
Best Urban / Hip Hop Album†	Best Dance / Electronica Album†
**Frontline – Borrowed Time**; Nesian Mystik – Fresh Men; Opensouls – Kaleidoscope	**Concord Dawn – Chaos By Design**; Recloose – Hiatus on the Horizon; Sola Rosa – Moves On
Best Aotearoa Roots Album†	Best Music Video†
**Fly My Pretties – The Return of Fly My Pretties**; Anika Moa – Stolen Hill; Rhombus – Future Reference	**Mark Williams – "Wandering Eye" (Fat Freddy'S Drop)**; Alyx Duncan -"Fuji" (Minuit); Adam Jones – "Long White Cross" (Pluto)
Peoples Choice Award†	Best Producer‡
**Fat Freddy's Drop**; Pluto; Frontline; Elemeno P; Bic Runga; Goodnight Nurse	**Bic Runga – Birds**; Don McGlashan, Sean Donnelly, Ed McWilliams – Warm Hand (Don McGlashan); David Holmes & Paul McLaney – Like Stray Voltage (Gramsci)
Best Engineer‡	Best Album Cover‡
**Andre Upston – Birds (Bic Runga)**; Andrew Spraggon / Angus McNaughton – Moves On (Sola Rosa); Lee Prebble – The Return of Fly My Pretties (Fly My Pretties)	**Chris Knox – As Sweet As Sin (Bleeders)**; Joe Garlick – The Return of Fly My Pretties (Fly My Pretties); Stephen Tolfrey – End The Silence (Blindspott)
Best Classical Album†	Best Maori Album†
**Tower Voices New Zealand – Spirit of the Land**; Bridget Douglas and Rachel Thomson – Taurangi; The New Zealand Trio – Spark	**Te Reotakiwa Dunn – Te Reotakiwa Dunn**; Mahara Tocker – Hurricane's Eye; Rodger Cunningham – Toto
Best Gospel / Christian Album†	Best Country Music Album†
**Juliagrace – Juliagrace**; Mumsdollar – A Beautiful Life; Shooting Stars – Over The Water	**Shane Warner – Absolutely**; Jacqui Watson -Uncut; Ron Mitchell – Low Down Country
Best Pacific Music Album†	Best Folk Album†
**Mt Vaea Band – Mama**; JXN & LavaBoyKila – First off the Plane; Annie Puletiuatoa – Childhood	**Lorina Harding – Clean Break**; Chris Priestley – Uncovered: A Collection Of New Zealand Folk Songs; Sean Kelly & Friends – See The Light
Best Jazz Album†	Outstanding Contribution to the Growth Of NZ Music on Radio†
**The Vaughn Roberts Big Band – Grrreat Stufff!**; Colin Hemmingsen – The Rite of Swing; Paul Dyne – Shelter of the Ti Tree	David Innes

== Performers ==
Live Performances on the night

- Frontline & Aaradhna performed "Lost in Translation"
- The Bleeders performed "Out of Time"
- Elemeno P & Friends (Carly Binding, Boh Runga and Brad Carter) performed "S.O.S" (Lani Purkis was absent from the awards and this performance as she had just given birth)
- Bic Runga performed "Say After Me"
- Concord Dawn performed "Broken Eyes"
- Don McGashen & Hollie Smith performed "Bathe in the River"
