= Coke Tunes =

Digital Music platform

Coke Tunes was an online music store in New Zealand run by the Coca-Cola Amatil. Coke Tunes had over 700,000 tracks as of January 1, 2006. Coke Tunes used Microsoft's digital rights management and Windows Media Audio 9.1.

Coke Tunes was, at one time, New Zealand's largest music store. It closed in May 2007.

== Compatibility ==
Since Coke Tunes used Microsoft's DRM technology, Apple iPod users could not listen to downloaded tracks because iTunes cannot convert DRM protected Windows Media Audio files.

The music store could only be accessed via Microsoft's Internet Explorer browser due to the use of embedded Windows Media Player to sample tracks.
