= Scribe (rapper) =

New Zealand rapper

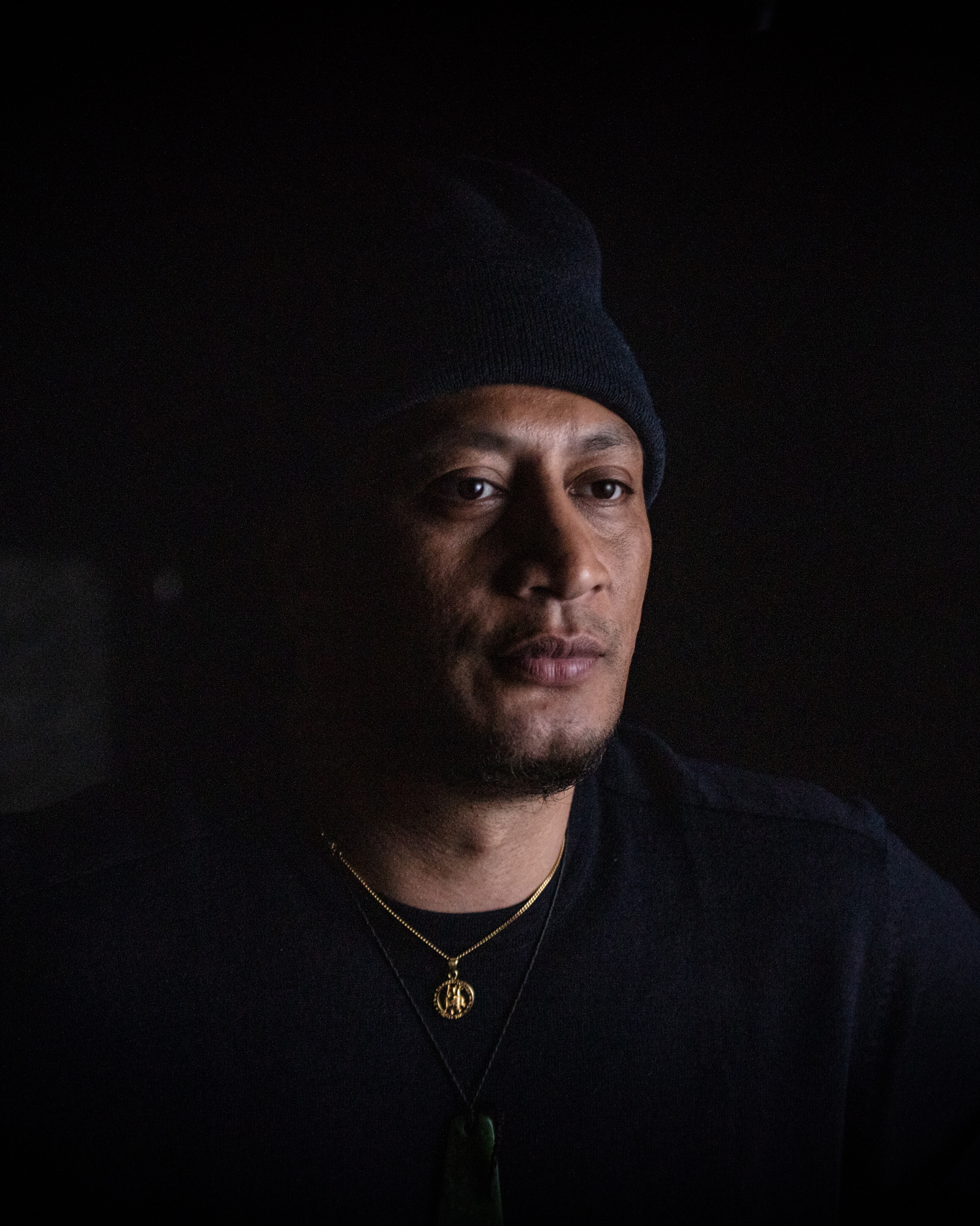
- Scribe in 2019

Background information
- Born: Malo 'Scribe' Luafutu or Jeshua Ioane Luafutu; 29 May 1979 (age 47); Christchurch, New Zealand
- Origin: Christchurch, New Zealand
- Genre: NZ Hip hop
- Occupation: Rapper
- Instruments: Vocals
- Years active: 1995–present
- Label: Dirty Records

Malo Ioane Luafutu, also called Jeshua Ioane Luafutu (born on 29 May 1979), and better known by his stage name Scribe, is a New Zealand rapper of Samoan descent. He achieved two solo number ones on the singles chart from his debut album, The Crusader, which was released in 2003 in New Zealand and later certified four times platinum. He also reached number one as a featured artist on P-Money's 2004 song "Stop the Music", and in 2010 on R&B singer J.Williams' single "You Got Me".

== Early life ==
Scribe was born Malo Loane Luafutu on 29 May 1979 in Christchurch, New Zealand, to Caroline 'Carol' Luafutu and Fa'amoana John Luafutu. He grew up in the suburb of Philipstown, Christchurch.

== Career ==
With the initial focus on the song "Stand Up", director Chris Graham gave the video for the single the energy of a rock video. He invited music guests, DJs and even the general public to participate as extras in the video. The song debuted at number 6 on the New Zealand top 40 singles chart and soon rose to number 1. The single spent 12 (non-consecutive) weeks at number one.

Dirty Records released Scribe's debut album "The Crusader" in New Zealand in October 2003 with distribution through Festival Mushroom Records. The album went gold within hours and platinum within days. It sold 60,000 copies in New Zealand, which is four times platinum status in that country.

Scribe followed the success of the album with the limited-edition release of "Not Many – The Remix!" featuring guest vocals from MCs Savage and Con Psy which peaked at No. 2. He then released a new single, "Dreaming" in January 2004; this also reached No. 1.

Scribe took a break from new singles and toured the country on the Hook It Up tour before he returned in late 2004 with a new single off P-Money's "Magic City" album called "Stop the Music", again reaching No. 1.

In 2005, he opened for the Beastie Boys at shows in Australia.

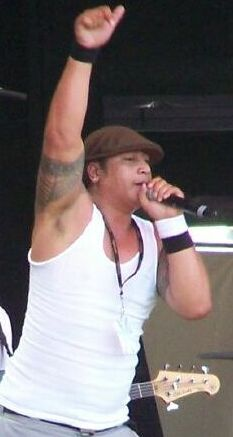
Scribe performing at Big Day Out in 2007

=== Rhyme Book ===
Scribe's second studio album, titled "Rhyme Book", was released by Scribe in Australia on 29 September 2007 and in New Zealand on 1 October 2007. "Rhyme Book" did not sell as well as its predecessor. It featured collaborations with New York hip-hop artist Talib Kweli (of Reflection Eternal and Black Star fame) on the track "Be Alright".

The first single off the album in New Zealand, "My Shit", had its video premiere on 12 August 2007 on local music channel C4. "F.R.E.S.H." was the second single released in New Zealand. The first single in Australia however was "F.R.E.S.H.", followed by "My Shit". The third single in both countries, "Say It Again", features Scribe's cousin Tyra Hammond.

=== Scribe Is Dead ===
After a decade hiatus, Scribe released a single titled "Non Attachment" which will feature on the forthcoming independently released album "Scribe Is Dead", originally announced for release in 2024. This effectively shelved his third album "Therapy" that was announced in 2011 but never released.

A second single for the album, titled "Glowstick", was released at the end of 2023. A third song, "Do or Die, Don’t or Die", was premiered in late April 2024. Scribe said in an interview with Rolling Stone that it would be his final album.

On 5 September 2025 the album was released.

== Personal struggles and addictions ==
In 2011, in an interview on Campbell Live, Scribe described how he became addicted to drugs, alcohol and gambling between 2005 and 2007 following lacklustre sales of his second album, "Rhyme Book". His addiction led to his family denying him access to money. He decided to pawn off the platinum awards he had won with his debut album.

In November 2011 Scribe was arrested in Wellington for disorder and released after being formally warned. Scribe said his arrest was illegal, but he admitted he was "dissing" the police but that "their ego couldn't handle it".

Following the assault on cricketer Jesse Ryder in late March 2013, Scribe took to Twitter, implying that Ryder was somehow responsible because his behaviour was not "humble" enough for someone visiting Christchurch. He further noted that "Cantabrians don't beat people up for no reason." Scribe's comments were widely vilified on Twitter and numerous blogs, with many posters alluding to Scribe's role in the violent, unprovoked assault on Phil Armstrong in 2004 as further evidence that he condones violence. Ryder later jokingly thanked Scribe for his "support".

In August 2018, Scribe was imprisoned for two months after breaching his curfew by performing in Motueka. He was released on 29 October. He was later due in court on 13 December for methamphetamine possession and breach of protection order.

== Christchurch earthquake ==
Scribe released a remix of his single "Not Many" to show support for the victims of the 2011 Christchurch earthquakes. "Not Many Cities" features Scribe rapping in different parts of the CBD's red zone, with altered lyrics such as "I don't know any city" instead of "I don't know anybody". Although his video received positive attention from the media, there was outcry from some Christchurch residents who claimed it was unfair that Scribe was allowed in the red zones when red zone business owners were not.

Shortly after the remix's release, Scribe announced that he was working on a third album, titled "Therapy", but it was later shelved.

== Family ==
Scribe is the cousin of other prominent Samoan New Zealand musicians Ladi6 and Tyra Hammond of The Opensouls. His father is Fa'amoana John Luafutu, who wrote the 2022 film A Boy Called Piano, directed by Nina Nawalowalo. Scribe's brother Matthias Luafutu is an actor.

Scribe, Matthias and their father John also collaborated with Tom McCrory and Nina Nawalowalo on the stage play A White Guitar in 2015, which was an autobiographical story that did an eight-city sold-out tour in 2016.

== Discography ==
=== Studio albums ===
Year	Album	Peak chart positions		Certifications
Year	Album	NZ	AUS	Certifications
2003	The Crusader: Released: 16 October 2003; Label: Dirty	1	12	RMNZ: 4× Platinum; ARIA: Platinum
2007	Rhyme Book: Released: 1 October 2007; Label: Dirty	4	9	RMNZ: Gold
2025	Scribe Is Dead: Released: 5 September 2025; Label: Scribe World Music Group			

=== Major album guest appearances ===
- P-Money – Big Things (2002) (six songs)
- Concord Dawn – Uprising (2003) (one song)
- P-Money – Magic City (2004) (three songs)
- P-Money – Everything (2010) (three songs)

=== Singles ===
Year	Single	Peak chart positions		Certifications	Album
Year	Single	NZ	AUS	Certifications	Album
2003	"Stand Up"/"Not Many"	1	—	RMNZ: Platinum	The Crusader
2003	"Not Many – The Remix!"/"Stand Up"	2	21	ARIA: Gold	The Crusader
2004	"Dreaming"/"So Nice"	1	23	RMNZ: 4× Platinum	The Crusader
2007	"My Shit"	4	—		Rhyme Book
2007	"F.R.E.S.H."	24	30		Rhyme Book
2007	"Say It Again" (featuring Tyra Hammond)	—	—		Rhyme Book
2011	"Not Many Cities"	36	—		Non-album single
2022	"Non Attachment"	?	?		Scribe is Dead
2023	"Glowstick"	?	?		Scribe is Dead
2024	"Do or Die, Don’t or Die"	?	?		Scribe is Dead
"—" denotes a single that did not chart or achieve certification

==== As featured artist ====
Year	Title	Peak chart positions		Certifications	Album
Year	Title	NZ	AUS	Certifications	Album
2004	"Stop the Music" (P-Money featuring Scribe)	1	7	RMNZ: Platinum; ARIA: Gold	Magic City
2010	"You Got Me" (J. Williams featuring Scribe)	1	—	RMNZ: Platinum	Young Love (Collector's Edition)
2010	"Fresh Boyz" (Nesian Mystik featuring Scribe)	—	—		99 A.D.
2010	"Christmas Wrapping" (Dominic Harvey featuring Scribe)	6	—		
2015	"The Pigeon Song" (Guy Williams featuring Scribe)	2	—		

== Awards and nominations ==
=== ARIA Music Awards ===
The ARIA Music Awards are a set of annual ceremonies presented by Australian Recording Industry Association (ARIA), which recognise excellence, innovation, and achievement across all genres of the music of Australia. They commenced in 1987.

Year	Nominee / work	Award	Result	Ref.
2026	3%, Fred Leone and Scribe (rapper)|Scribe – Fox League 2025: Finals Footy (Fox Sports Australia)	Best Use of an Australian Recording in an Advertisement	Nominated	
