= P-Money =

New Zealand DJ and record producer

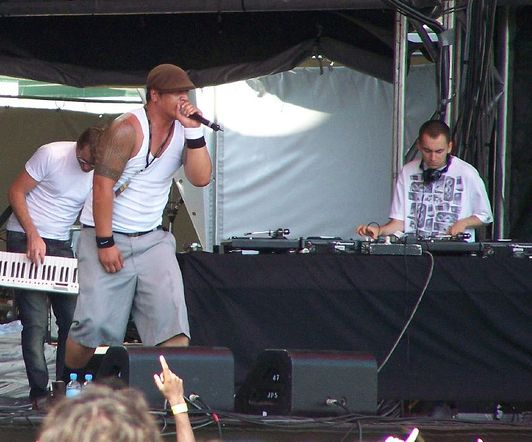
- P-Money (right) performing with Scribe at the Big Day Out in 2007

Background information
- Born: Peter Wadams; New Zealand
- Origin: Papakura, Auckland, New Zealand
- Genres: Hip hop; R&B; dance; electronic
- Occupations: DJ; record producer; songwriter
- Years active: 1990s–present
- Labels: Dirty Records; Dawn Raid Entertainment; Duck Down Music
- Website: pmoneymusic.com

Peter Wadams, known professionally as P-Money, is a New Zealand DJ, record producer and songwriter from Auckland. Emerging from New Zealand's hip-hop and turntablism scene, he became one of the country's most prominent hip-hop producers of the 2000s. He is best known for his work with Scribe, including production on The Crusader and the singles "Stand Up", "Not Many" and "Dreaming", as well as his own singles "Stop the Music" and "Everything".

P-Money's debut album, Big Things, was released in 2002 and reached number seven on the New Zealand Albums Chart. His second studio album, Magic City reached number two in New Zealand, while its single "Stop the Music", featuring Scribe, reached number one in New Zealand and number seven in Australia.

In 2008, P-Money released "Everything", featuring Vince Harder which reached number one in New Zealand. He later collaborated with American rapper Buckshot on the 2014 album Backpack Travels, which charted on Billboard's United States rap albums chart. P-Money also achieved major international success as a co-writer and producer of Starley's single "Call on Me", which APRA AMCOS recognised after surpassing one billion streams across major services including Spotify, Apple Music and YouTube.

== Early life and background ==
Wadams grew up in Papakura, Auckland. As a child and teenager, he was influenced by American hip-hop acts including Run-DMC, Public Enemy, N.W.A and Geto Boys, as well as hip-hop magazines such as The Source. He became interested in DJing after hearing scratching and turntablism on rap records, later experimenting with a turntable, cassette deck and mixer before receiving a second turntable and drum machine from his father.

During the 1990s, Wadams became active in Auckland's hip-hop community through student radio, DJ competitions and local performances. He was associated with 95bFM's Trueschool Hip Hop Show, where he connected with figures including DLT, Otis Frizzell, Mark Williams and DJ Sir-Vere.

== Career ==
=== DJ battles and early recognition ===
Before becoming widely known as a producer, P-Money built his reputation as a battle DJ and turntablist. In 2001, he represented New Zealand at the DMC World DJ Championships and placed third equal, behind Plus One and Klever and alongside Kentaro.

His early DJ work led to wider involvement in New Zealand hip hop. At the inaugural Aotearoa Hip-Hop Summit in Christchurch in 2000, he reconnected with South Island artists and met Christchurch rapper Scribe, with whom he would later form one of the defining producer-rapper partnerships in New Zealand hip-hop history.

=== 2001–2003: Big Things and work with Scribe ===
P-Money's early production credits included four tracks on Che Fu's 2001 album Navigator. In 2002, he released his debut studio album, Big Things, through Dirty Records. The album reached number seven on the New Zealand Albums Chart and was later certified platinum in New Zealand.

Big Things helped introduce a wider audience to Scribe, who appeared on the album. In 2003, P-Money produced seven of the twelve tracks on Scribe's debut album The Crusader including "Stand Up", "Not Many" and "Dreaming". "Stand Up" topped the New Zealand charts for 12 weeks as a double A-side single with "Not Many". P-Money won Producer of the Year at the 2004 New Zealand Music Awards for his work on The Crusader.

=== 2004–2007: Magic City and mainstream success ===
P-Money released his second studio album, Magic City, in 2004. The album featured New Zealand and international artists including Scribe, PNC, David Dallas, Akon, Sauce Money, Capone, Bobby Creekwater and Roc Raida. It reached number two on the New Zealand Albums Chart and was certified double platinum in New Zealand.

The album's lead single, "Stop the Music", featuring Scribe, reached number one in New Zealand and number seven in Australia. It was certified platinum by Recorded Music NZ. The follow-up single "Keep on Callin", featuring Akon, reached number 23 in New Zealand.

At the 2005 New Zealand Music Awards, P-Money won Best Male Solo Artist and Best Urban / Hip Hop Album for Magic City.

=== 2008–2012: Everything and electronic-oriented production ===
In 2008, P-Money released "Everything", featuring Vince Harder. The song reached number one in New Zealand, number 85 in Australia and number 138 in the United Kingdom. It was certified platinum in New Zealand.

His third studio album, Everything was released in 2010 and reached number 25 on the New Zealand Albums Chart. The album reflected a broader dance and electronic influence while retaining elements of hip hop and R&B.

=== 2013–2015: Gratitude, Duck Down Music and BackPack Travels ===
P-Money released Gratitude in 2013. The album marked a return to sample-based hip hop and included collaborations with Talib Kweli, Havoc, M.O.P., Buckshot, Freddie Gibbs, Fashawn, Skyzoo, Aaradhna and At Peace. Gratitude reached number 23 on the New Zealand Albums Chart.

In 2014, P-Money released Backpack Travels, a collaborative album with American rapper Buckshot. The album was released through Duck Down Music, Dirty Records and Dawn Raid Entertainment, and was produced entirely by P-Money. It reached number 14 on the New Zealand Artists Albums Chart and number 19 on Billboard's Top Rap Albums chart.

In 2015, P-Money curated and supervised the soundtrack for the New Zealand feature film Born to Dance.

=== 2016–present: International songwriting success and later work ===
P-Money achieved one of his most internationally successful credits as a co-writer and producer of "Call on Me" by Australian singer Starley. Released in 2016 as Starley's debut single, the song became a global hit after receiving a remix by Australian producer Ryan Riback.

APRA AMCOS recognised Starley and P-Money on its 1,000,000,000 List after "Call on Me" surpassed one billion streams across major services including Spotify, Apple Music and YouTube. The organisation reported that the song spent much of 2017 on charts around the world, including top-ten positions in the United Kingdom, United States, Austria, Czech Republic, Denmark, Germany, Ireland, Netherlands, Norway, Scotland and Switzerland. In the United Kingdom, "Call on Me" reached number six on the Official Singles Chart and number four on the Irish Singles Chart. APRA AMCOS also reported that the song achieved multi-platinum certifications in multiple countries, including diamond status in France, 5× platinum in Sweden, and triple platinum in Australia and Canada.

P-Money continued to work as a producer, songwriter, remixer and DJ in the late 2010s and 2020s. His later releases and collaborations include "Hey Hey", "Midnight Groove" with Ella Monnery, "Our Worlds" with Otosan and Kings, and remixes for artists including Kora, Mollie Collins and Elipsa.

== Artistry and influence ==
P-Money's work is rooted in hip hop, DJ culture and turntablism. His early production style drew from sample-based hip hop and East Coast rap, while later work incorporated R&B, dance, house and electronic influences.

In a 2013 profile, NZ Musician described Wadams as a producer, label owner, mentor and musician who had played a major role in New Zealand hip hop for more than a decade.

== Dirty Records ==
P-Money established Dirty Records in 2001 with business partner Callum August. The label became closely associated with the rise of commercially successful New Zealand hip hop through releases by P-Money, Scribe, David Dallas & PNC

== Production and songwriting credits ==
Selected production and songwriting credits
Year	Artist	Work	Role / notes	Ref.
2001	Che Fu	Navigator	Production on four tracks.	
2002	P-Money	Big Things	Debut studio album; featured Scribe and other New Zealand hip-hop artists.	
2003	Scribe	The Crusader	Produced seven tracks, including "Stand Up", "Not Many" and "Dreaming".	
2004	P-Money featuring Scribe	"Stop the Music"	New Zealand number-one single; top-ten single in Australia.	
2008	P-Money featuring Vince Harder	"Everything"	New Zealand number-one single.	
2013	P-Money	Gratitude	Featured Talib Kweli, Havoc, M.O.P, Buckshot, Freddie Gibbs, Skyzoo, Aaradhna and @Peace.	
2014	Buckshot and P-Money	BackPack Travels	Collaborative album released through Duck Down Music.	
2016	Starley	"Call on Me"	Co-writer and producer. The song became an international hit and was recognised by APRA AMCOS after surpassing one billion streams across major services.	

== Awards and recognition ==
Year	Award or recognition	Work	Result	Ref.
2001	DMC World DJ Championships	—	Third place equal	
2004	New Zealand Music Awards – Producer of the Year	The Crusader by Scribe	Won	
2004	New Zealand Music Awards – Songwriter of the Year	"Not Many – The Remix!"	Won	
2005	bNet New Zealand Music Awards – Best Hip-Hop Release	Magic City	Won	
2005	New Zealand Music Awards – Best Urban / Hip Hop Album	Magic City	Won	
2005	New Zealand Music Awards – Best Male Solo Artist	Magic City	Won	
2009	New Zealand Music Awards – Single of the Year	"Everything"	Nominated	
2010	New Zealand Music Awards – Best Electronica Album	Everything	Nominated	
2019	APRA AMCOS 1,000,000,000 List	"Call on Me"	Recognised	

== Discography ==
=== Studio and collaborative albums ===
Albums and major chart positions
Title	Details	Peak chart positions			Certifications
Title	Details	NZ	NZ Artists	US Rap	Certifications
Big Things	Released: 2002; Label: Dirty Records; Format: CD, digital	7	—	—	RMNZ: Platinum
Big Things Instrumentals	Released: 2003; Label: Dirty Records; Format: CD	26	—	—	—
Magic City	Released: 2004; Label: Dirty Records / Dawn Raid Entertainment; Format: CD, digital	2	—	—	RMNZ: 2× Platinum
Everything	Released: 2010; Label: Dirty Records; Format: CD, digital	25	—	—	—
Gratitude	Released: 2013; Label: Dirty Records / Duck Down Music; Format: CD, digital	23	—	—	—
Backpack Travels with Buckshot	Released: 2014; Label: Dirty Records / Duck Down Music / Dawn Raid Entertainment; Format: CD, digital	—	14	19	—

=== Extended plays ===
Title	Details
The Baddest with Gappy Ranks	Released: 2014; Label: Dirty Records / Dawn Raid Music; Format: Digital download, streaming

=== Singles ===
Singles and chart positions
Year	Title	Credited artist(s)	Peak chart positions					Certifications	Album
Year	Title	Credited artist(s)	NZ	NZ Hot	NZ Hot Aotearoa	AUS	UK	Certifications	Album
2001	"Sunshine"	P-Money featuring Scribe	—	—	—	—	—	—	Non-album single
2001	"Scribe 2001"	P-Money featuring Scribe	—	—	—	—	—	—	Big Things
2002	"Synchronize Thoughts"	P-Money featuring 4 Corners and Scribe	—	—	—	—	—	—	Big Things
2004	"3,2,1" / "Get Back"	P-Money featuring Con Psy, PNC and Skillz	—	—	—	—	—	—	Magic City
2004	"Stop the Music"	P-Money featuring Scribe	1	—	—	7	—	RMNZ: Platinum	Magic City
2005	"Keep on Callin"	P-Money featuring Akon	23	—	—	—	—	—	Magic City
2008	"Everything"	P-Money featuring Vince Harder	1	—	—	85	138	RMNZ: Platinum	Everything
2009	"Angels"	P-Money	—	—	—	—	—	—	Everything
2010	"Love Alone"	P-Money featuring Vince Harder	—	—	—	—	—	—	Everything
2010	"Say Yeah"	P-Money featuring David Dallas and Aaradhna	—	—	—	—	—	—	Everything
2012	"Kinda Lovin"	P-Money and Dan Aux	—	—	—	—	—	—	Non-album single
2012	"Turn Me Out"	P-Money featuring Mayavanya and Kaleena Zanders	—	—	—	—	—	—	Non-album single
2013	"Celebration Flow"	P-Money featuring Aaradhna and Talib Kweli	—	—	—	—	—	—	Gratitude
2014	"New Love"	CTFD and P-Money	—	—	—	—	—	—	Non-album single
2014	"Flute"	Buckshot and P-Money featuring Joey Badass and CJ Fly	—	—	—	—	—	—	Backpack Travels
2014	"Baddest"	P-Money and Gappy Ranks	—	—	—	—	—	—	The Baddest
2020	"Secret Lover (P-Money House Mix)"	Kora	—	37	6	—	—	—	Non-album remix
2020	"Hey Hey"	P-Money	—	—	10	—	—	—	Non-album single
2021	"Midnight Groove"	Ella Monnery and P-Money	—	—	20	—	—	—	Non-album single
2022	"Our Worlds"	Otosan, P-Money and Kings	—	29	3	—	—	—	Non-album single
2023	"Shut It Down (P Money Remix)"	Mollie Collins and Elipsa	—	—	8	—	—	—	Non-album remix

"—" denotes a recording that did not chart, was not released in that territory, or for which no reliable chart source has been identified.

== Film work ==
Year	Film	Role	Ref.
2015	Born to Dance	Soundtrack curator	

== See also ==
- New Zealand hip hop
- Scribe
- Dirty Records
- Dawn Raid Entertainment
- David Dallas
