= Dirty Records =

New Zealand independent record label

- Founded: 2001
- Founder: Peter "P-Money" Wadams; Callum August
- Genre: Hip hop
- Country of origin: New Zealand
- Location: Auckland
- Official website: www.dirty.co.nz

Dirty Records is an Auckland-based New Zealand independent record label, focusing primarily on hip hop music. It was founded in 2001 by music producer Peter "P-Money" Wadams and his business partner Callum August.

Dirty Records has been described as "one of the stand-out success stories of a thriving music scene".

== Artists ==
- P-Money
- Scribe
- PNC
- Frontline
- David Dallas

== Albums ==
- Unique: Jerry 4 W.A. (2002)
- P-Money: Big Things (2001), Big Things Instrumentals (2002), Magic City (2004), Unreleased Joints & Remixes (2007)
- Scribe: The Crusader (2003), Rhymebook (2007)
- PNC: Ooooooh...On The PNC Tip - Mixtape (2005), Rookie Card (2006), Bazooka Kid (2009)
- Frontline: What You Expect? (2004), Borrowed Time (2005)
- David Dallas: Something Awesome (2009)

== See also ==
- List of record labels
