= PNC (rapper) =

New Zealand rapper

- Also known as: Sam Hansen
- Born: Samuel Hansen
- Origin: Palmerston North, New Zealand
- Genres: Hip hop; rap
- Occupations: Rapper; songwriter
- Years active: 2003–present
- Labels: Dirty Records; Flair Ultra Music
- Website: soundcloud.com/pnc-1

Samuel Hansen, known professionally as PNC, is a New Zealand rapper and songwriter from Palmerston North. His stage name refers to Palmerston North City. He first gained attention in the early 2000s through the New Zealand underground hip-hop scene before signing to P-Money's Dirty Records.

PNC appeared on several tracks from P-Money's 2004 album Magic City, including "Get Back" and the "3,2,1" remix, and later released his debut album, Rookie Card, in 2006. The album produced the top-20 New Zealand singles "Just Roll" and "PNWhoa!" and won Best Urban / Hip Hop Album at the 2007 New Zealand Music Awards.

His later releases include Bazooka Kid (2009), Man On Wire (2011), Under the Influence (2012), The Codes (2014), The Luke Vailima EP (2016) and the Unbothered Rapper project beginning in 2024. The Spinoff has described Bazooka Kid as "one of the most singular hip hop albums ever released in New Zealand".

== Early life and background ==
Hansen is from Palmerston North, New Zealand. His stage name, PNC, is an acronym of Palmerston North City. He has discussed being of mixed Samoan and Pākehā / Palagi background, including through songs such as "Half Kast" from Bazooka Kid.

PNC first gained underground attention performing with Breaking Wreckwordz. His early unofficial single "Day in the Life" topped the bFM charts, and his early work brought him to the attention of New Zealand hip-hop figures including P-Money.

== Career ==
=== 2003–2005: Underground work and P-Money collaborations ===
PNC emerged in the early 2000s within the New Zealand underground hip-hop scene. Muzic.NZ describes him as first gaining notoriety with "Day in the Life", before appearing on tracks from P-Money's 2004 album Magic City. These appearances included "Get Back" and the "3,2,1" remix, alongside artists such as David Dallas.

His early collaborations with P-Money helped lead to a contract with Dirty Records. During this period he also appeared on New Zealand hip-hop compilations and guest tracks, positioning him within the post-The Crusader wave of commercially visible New Zealand rap.

=== 2006–2008: Rookie Card and New Zealand Music Award win ===
PNC released his debut studio album, Rookie Card, in 2006 through Dirty Records. The album reached number 30 on the New Zealand Albums Chart.

The album's singles included "Just Roll", which reached number 11 on the New Zealand Singles Chart, and "PNWhoa!", which reached number 17. Muzic.NZ described "Who Betta Than This" as an underground success. In 2007, Rookie Card won Best Urban / Hip Hop Album at the New Zealand Music Awards. That same year, PNC was also nominated at the Pacific Music Awards for Best Pacific Hip Hop Artist and Best Pacific Male Artist.

=== 2009–2010: Bazooka Kid and expanded sound ===
PNC released his second album, Bazooka Kid, in 2009. The album reached number 18 on the New Zealand Albums Chart and spent three weeks in the chart. Its singles included "Tonight", which reached number 35 on the New Zealand Singles Chart.

Muzic.NZ reported that Bazooka Kid received strong reviews from New Zealand publications, including four-star reviews from The New Zealand Herald and The Dominion Post, and a five-star review in Real Groove. In a 2019 retrospective interview, The Spinoff described the album as one of the most singular hip-hop albums released in New Zealand, noting its heavy 1980s influence, large synthesiser sounds, hard drums and dense lyrical delivery. The same article highlighted songs such as "Intro" and "Half Kast" as examples of the album's personal and identity-focused writing.

In 2009, PNC also collaborated with drum and bass group State of Mind on "City on Fire", which Muzic.NZ described as a local and international club anthem.

=== 2011–2013: Man On Wire, Under the Influence and independent label ===
PNC released his third studio album, Man On Wire, in 2011. The album reached number 39 on the New Zealand Albums Chart. Muzic.NZ reported that the album led to another Best Hip-Hop Album nomination.

In 2012, PNC collaborated with producer Matt Miller on Under the Influence, released as a free download. Muzic.NZ reported that the project received more than 20,000 downloads. The same year, he supplied entrance music for Sonny Bill Williams' fight against Clarence Tillman III, reworking Drake's "The Motto" into "SBW Theme".

In 2013, PNC left Dirty Records and established the independent label Flair Ultra Music.

=== 2014–2016: The Codes and The Luke Vailima EP ===
PNC released The Codes in 2014. The album reached number 16 on the New Zealand Albums Chart. NZ Musician described the album as a stylistic shift that incorporated dance and electronic elements while retaining PNC's lyrical focus.

The Codes was nominated for Best Urban / Hip Hop Album at the 2014 New Zealand Music Awards, alongside David Dallas's Falling into Place and Ladi6's Automatic.

In 2016, PNC released The Luke Vailima EP. The New Zealand Music Commission described the project as earning another Best Urban Hip-Hop Album nomination. The Aotearoa Music Awards archive lists The Luke Vailima EP as a finalist in the 2016 Urban / Hip Hop category.

After this period, PNC shifted more of his focus to behind-the-scenes work and earned an honours degree in psychology, while continuing to release music including "Heil Maria" and "Ring Bells".

=== 2017–2023: Later singles and study ===
PNC released standalone singles in the late 2010s, including "Iverson 01" and "Too Easy". The songs continued a pattern of sports references in his music, following earlier tracks such as "Sonny Bill 04" and "Jonah 95".

In a 2019 interview with The Spinoff, Hansen discussed the long-term reputation of Bazooka Kid, his mixed-ethnicity identity, the difficulty of sustaining a rap career in New Zealand, and his later study of psychology. The article described Under the Influence and The Luke Vailima EP as essential parts of the New Zealand rap canon.

=== 2024–present: Unbothered Rapper era ===
In 2024, PNC returned with new music under the project title Unbothered Rapper. The project included the singles "Mazda Familia", "SJ 23", "Zig Zag" and "We On".

"Zig Zag", featuring David Dallas and produced by Matt Miller, entered the Hot NZ Singles Chart at number three. The release marked PNC and David Dallas's first collaboration in eight years. The music video was directed by Stacy Tapsell and was supported by NZ On Air. Muzic.NZ reported that "We On", the fourth single from Unbothered Rapper, re-entered the Hot NZ Singles Chart in 2024.

In 2026, PNC released Unbothered Rapper II, a five-track EP.

== Artistry and themes ==
PNC is known for a fluid, technical rap style and hook-driven songwriting. Muzic.NZ described him as a "true songwriter" with writing credits on New Zealand top-ten singles, including P-Money's number-one singles "Stop the Music" and "Everything".

His lyrics often include sports references, personal reflection, social observation and references to his Palmerston North background. Songs such as "Half Kast" and "Intro" from Bazooka Kid address family, class and mixed-ethnicity identity. In the same retrospective, PNC said Bazooka Kid reflected a period when he was trying to find himself as a writer and artist.

Musically, Bazooka Kid has been noted for its 1980s-influenced synthesiser sound, while The Codes incorporated more dance and electronic elements.

== Legacy and influence ==
PNC is regarded as one of the key New Zealand rappers to emerge after the early-2000s commercial breakthrough of New Zealand hip hop associated with Scribe, P-Money, Dirty Records and Dawn Raid Entertainment. His debut album Rookie Card won a New Zealand Music Award, while later projects such as Bazooka Kid, Under the Influence and The Luke Vailima EP have been cited by New Zealand music writers as important works in the local rap canon.

== Discography ==
=== Studio albums and EPs ===
Albums and EPs, with selected chart positions
Title	Details	Peak chart position
Title	Details	NZ
Rookie Card	Released: 2006; Label: Dirty Records; Format: CD, digital	30
Bazooka Kid	Released: 2009; Label: Dirty Records; Format: CD, digital	18
Man On Wire	Released: 2011; Label: Dirty Records; Format: CD, digital	39
Under the Influence	Released: 2012; Label: Flair Ultra Music; Format: Digital download	—
The Codes	Released: 2014; Label: RookieKid; Format: CD, digital	16
The Luke Vailima EP	Released: 2016; Label: Independent; Format: Digital download, streaming	—
Unbothered Rapper II	Released: 2026; Label: Independent; Format: Digital download, streaming	—

=== Mixtapes ===
Title	Year	Notes
Ohhhh.....On the PNC Tip	2005	Early mixtape release.

=== Singles ===
Selected singles and chart positions
Year	Title	Artist credit	Peak chart positions			Album / project
Year	Title	Artist credit	NZ	NZ Hot	NZ Hot Aotearoa	Album / project
2003	"Day in the Life"	PNC	—	—	—	Non-album single
2006	"Just Roll"	PNC	11	—	—	Rookie Card
2006	"Who Betta Than This?"	PNC	—	—	—	Rookie Card
2007	"PNWhoa!"	PNC	17	—	—	Rookie Card
2007	"Saturday Getaway"	PNC featuring Awa	—	—	—	Rookie Card
2008	"Moonlight"	PNC featuring Zeisha Fremaux	—	—	—	Bazooka Kid
2008	"Find Me"	PNC featuring Chong Nee	—	—	—	Bazooka Kid
2008	"Take Me Home"	PNC featuring Mz J	—	—	—	Bazooka Kid
2009	"Tonight"	PNC	35	—	—	Bazooka Kid
2009	"1/2 Kast"	PNC	—	—	—	Bazooka Kid
2011	"Let Your Lover Know"	PNC featuring The Checks	—	—	—	Man On Wire
2011	"Murderer"	PNC	—	—	—	Man On Wire
2011	"That Kinda Guy"	PNC	—	—	—	Man On Wire
2016	"All I See"	PNC	—	—	—	The Luke Vailima EP
2016	"Sonny Bill 04"	PNC	—	—	—	The Luke Vailima EP
2016	"Hova Song"	PNC	—	—	—	The Luke Vailima EP
2016	"Jonah 95"	PNC	—	—	—	The Luke Vailima EP
2017	"Iverson 01"	PNC	—	—	—	Non-album single
2017	"Too Easy"	PNC	—	—	—	Non-album single
2024	"Mazda Familia"	PNC	—	—	—	Unbothered Rapper
2024	"SJ 23"	PNC	—	—	—	Unbothered Rapper
2024	"Zig Zag"	PNC featuring David Dallas	—	—	3	Unbothered Rapper
2024	"We On"	PNC	—	—	11	Unbothered Rapper

"—" denotes a recording that did not chart, was not released in that territory, or for which no reliable chart source has been identified.

=== Selected featured appearances ===
Year	Song	Artist	Project
2004	"3,2,1" remix / "Get Back"	P-Money featuring PNC and David Dallas	Magic City
2005	"Move Make Way"	Tyree featuring Savage and PNC	Sione's Wedding soundtrack
2007	"Put Your Hands Up"	Scribe featuring PNC	Rhymebook
2008	"Think Twice"	Aotearoa All Stars	Non-album single
2008	"Everything" rap remix	P-Money featuring PNC, David Dallas, Vince Harder and others	Everything
2009	"City on Fire"	State of Mind featuring PNC	Faster Than Light
2009	"In the Mood"	David Dallas featuring PNC	Something Awesome
2015	"Team, Ball, Player, Thing"	#KiwisCureBatten featuring Lorde, Kimbra, Brooke Fraser and others	Non-album charity single

== Awards and nominations ==
Year	Award	Work	Result	Ref.
2007	New Zealand Music Awards – Best Urban / Hip Hop Album	Rookie Card	Won	
2007	Pacific Music Awards – Best Pacific Hip Hop Artist	Rookie Card	Nominated	
2007	Pacific Music Awards – Best Pacific Male Artist	Rookie Card	Nominated	
2014	New Zealand Music Awards – Best Urban / Hip Hop Album	The Codes	Nominated	
2016	New Zealand Music Awards – Best Urban / Hip Hop Album	The Luke Vailima EP	Nominated	

== See also ==
- New Zealand hip hop
- P-Money
- David Dallas
- Dirty Records
- Dawn Raid Entertainment
