= David Dallas =

New Zealand rapper and songwriter

- Also known as: Con Psy
- Born: Papatoetoe, Auckland, New Zealand
- Origin: Auckland, New Zealand
- Genres: Hip hop; rap
- Occupations: Rapper; songwriter
- Years active: 2001–present
- Labels: Dirty Records; Dawn Raid Entertainment; Duck Down Music; Mean As Music; Hobby
- Formerly of: Frontline
- Website: daviddallas.com

David Dallas is a New Zealand rapper and songwriter from Papatoetoe, Auckland. Of Samoan and New Zealand European descent, he first performed under the name Con Psy as one half of the hip-hop duo Frontline, before releasing solo music under his own name from 2008.

Dallas first gained wider attention through Frontline and his appearance on Scribe's commercially successful "Not Many – The Remix!" / "Stand Up", alongside Savage and P-Money. The single reached number two in New Zealand and number 21 in Australia, where it was certified gold by the Australian Recording Industry Association.

His solo releases include the EPs Something Now (2008), Buffalo Man (2012) and Vita (2024), and the albums Something Awesome (2009), The Rose Tint (2011), Falling into Place (2013) and Hood Country Club (2017).

His 2013 single "Runnin'" reached number seven on the New Zealand Singles Chart and number one on the Aotearoa Singles Chart, and became one of his most widely recognised songs internationally through use in sports media, video games, film and streaming.

Dallas has won multiple New Zealand and Pacific music awards, including Best Urban / Hip Hop Album at the 2010 New Zealand Music Awards for Something Awesome, Best Male Solo Artist and Best Urban / Hip Hop Album at the 2014 New Zealand Music Awards for Falling into Place, and Best Hip Hop Artist at the 2025 Aotearoa Music Awards for Vita. He also created and curated the Red Bull 64 Bars platform, which became an important showcase for emerging New Zealand rappers.

== Early life and background ==
Dallas was born in Papatoetoe, Auckland, and is of Samoan and New Zealand European heritage. He grew up in South Auckland and developed an early interest in hip hop through his older brother, who played hip-hop music around the house.

Dallas studied computer science at the University of Auckland, graduating with a Bachelor of Science in 2003. He later credited university with helping him develop discipline and perseverance, while also noting that his interest in computers, online music communities and home recording software helped lead him into music-making. In 2003, he won the Auckland MC Battle for Supremacy as an unknown performer.

== Career ==
=== 2001–2006: Frontline and Con Psy ===
Dallas formed Frontline in 2001 with producer and DJ Nick "41" Maclaren. At the time, Dallas performed under the name Con Psy. Frontline released the independent street album What You Expect?, which sold more than 1,200 copies without formal distribution before the duo signed with Dirty Records.

In 2003, Dallas appeared as Con Psy on Scribe's "Not Many – The Remix!" / "Stand Up", alongside Savage and P-Money. The single reached number two on the New Zealand Singles Chart and number 21 on the Australian Singles Chart, and was certified gold in Australia. The remix became one of the key releases of New Zealand hip hop's early-2000s mainstream breakthrough.

Frontline released the album Borrowed Time in 2005. The album reached number 27 on the New Zealand Albums Chart. Its singles included "Breathe with Me", which reached number 16 in New Zealand, and "Lost in Translation", which reached number 22. Borrowed Time won Best Urban / Hip Hop Album at the 2006 New Zealand Music Awards.

=== 2008–2010: Solo debut and Something Awesome ===
Dallas began recording and performing under his given name in 2008. His debut solo EP, Something Now, was released in 2008 through Dirty Records. His debut solo album, Something Awesome, followed in 2009 and reached number 20 on the New Zealand Albums Chart. AudioCulture reported that the album also reached number one on the New Zealand iTunes album chart.

Something Awesome won Best Urban / Hip Hop Album at the 2010 New Zealand Music Awards and was shortlisted for the inaugural Taite Music Prize. In 2010, Kanye West posted the music video for Dallas's song "Big Time" on his website, helping bring Dallas to a wider international hip-hop audience. Later that year, Dallas signed with New York hip-hop label Duck Down Music in partnership with Dawn Raid Entertainment and Dirty Management.

=== 2010–2012: United States activity, Duck Down and The Rose Tint ===
Dallas's first United States visit was in 2010, when he performed at South by Southwest in Austin, Texas. Around this period, his music attracted attention from American hip-hop blogs, including Kanye West's website, which posted the music video for "Big Time". After signing with New York label Duck Down Music, Dallas divided his time between Auckland and New York City.

Dallas released The Rose Tint in 2011 as a free download. The album was downloaded more than 50,000 times before receiving a deluxe commercial release in New Zealand, Australia and North America. It reached number three on the New Zealand Albums Chart. UnderTheRadar reported that the album received more than 8,000 downloads within its first 24 hours of release.

During the Rose Tint period, Dallas was based in New York City and worked to build a United States audience. The album included collaborations with American rappers Freddie Gibbs on "Caught in a Daze", Buckshot on "Ain't Coming Down", and Kid Daytona and Tayyib Ali on "Feel Like Oasis". AudioCulture noted that "Caught in a Daze" helped boost Dallas's stateside profile and that its video contrasted Gibbs's home life in Los Angeles with Dallas in South Auckland. The video for "Life Is..." was shot in New York while Dallas was living there.

Dallas also received coverage from United States hip-hop media during this period. UnderTheRadar reported that he had been covered by sites including NahRight, 2DopeBoyz, XXL, The Source and ThisIs50, and that he had been voted MTV Iggy's Artist of the Week in an MTV U.S. online poll. The same source reported that his "Big Time" video had been added to rotation across MTV networks in the United States. XXL reviewed The Rose Tint in June 2011, describing the album as an overseas expansion for Dallas after the New Zealand success of Something Awesome and highlighting "Caught in a Daze" with Freddie Gibbs as an album standout.

In 2011, Dallas recorded and performed "So Close Now", the entrance theme for the American Samoan WWE tag team The Usos. In 2012, he released Buffalo Man, an EP built around songs inspired by, sampled from or interpolating Jamiroquai's catalogue. In September and October 2012, he toured the United States opening for American duo Aer. A 2016 Vice profile of P-Money described Dallas's United States period as including videos filmed in Los Angeles and New York, spot dates alongside Just Blaze and Pharoahe Monch, and work on the American media circuit; it also stated that "Caught in a Daze" appeared in the new artist section of BET's 106 & Park.

In 2021, Dallas marked the tenth anniversary of The Rose Tint with a limited vinyl pressing and a four-date New Zealand anniversary tour with his band The Daylight Robbery.

=== 2013–2016: Falling into Place, "Runnin'" and international visibility ===
Dallas released his third solo album, Falling into Place, in 2013. The album reached number two on the New Zealand Albums Chart. The album was released through Dawn Raid Entertainment, Dirty Records and Duck Down Music, and Billboard described it as Dallas's first conventional retail release in the United States. It featured production from Fire & Ice and 41 and guest appearances from artists including Freddie Gibbs, Sid Diamond, Ruby Frost, PNC, Mareko, Spycc and Rokske.

The album's lead single, "Runnin'", reached number seven on the New Zealand Singles Chart and number one on the Aotearoa Singles Chart. It was later described by NZ Musician as a platinum-selling single. The follow-up single "The Wire", featuring Ruby Frost, reached number 11 in New Zealand and number one on the Aotearoa Singles Chart, and was described by NZ Musician as a gold-charting follow-up.

"Runnin'" became Dallas's most internationally visible track. Billboard reported in 2013 that the song had been used on ESPN's Monday Night Football, in the trailer for Madden NFL 25, on the FIFA 14 soundtrack and in Major League Baseball coverage. In February 2014, Billboard included Dallas in a list of New Zealand artists who could make a "Lorde-like leap" internationally. The song later appeared in the 2022 Netflix film Hustle, after which it re-entered the New Zealand Hot Singles Chart at number 20.

At the 2014 New Zealand Music Awards, Dallas won Best Male Solo Artist and Best Urban / Hip Hop Album for Falling into Place. At the 2014 Pacific Music Awards, he won Best Pacific Male Artist and Best Pacific Urban Artist, and "Runnin'" received the NZ On Air Radio Airplay Award.

In February 2014, Dallas performed on the Auckland date of Eminem's Rapture tour at Western Springs Stadium.

=== 2015–present: 64 Bars and curatorial work ===
In 2015, Dallas created and curated Red Bull 64 Bars with Red Bull Music Studios Auckland. The series asks rappers to perform 64-bar verses without conventional song structures such as hooks, and became a showcase for emerging and established New Zealand hip-hop artists. The Spinoff described the series as a local rite of passage for underground New Zealand rappers, noting that it had helped expose artists including JessB, MELODOWNZ, Raiza Biza and SWIDT's INF to wider audiences.

The project expanded beyond New Zealand, including a Tokyo edition in 2018. In 2019, Red Bull Music presented 64 Bars Live in Auckland, curated by Dallas and featuring artists from the series.

=== 2017–2023: Hood Country Club and later singles ===
Dallas released Hood Country Club in 2017. The album reached number 10 on the New Zealand Albums Chart and number four on the New Zealand Artists Albums Chart. The album included the singles "Fit In", "Probably" and "This Is It". NZ Musician described Hood Country Club as an album that widened Dallas's subject matter, touching on politics, cultural identity, authenticity and personal experience.

In 2017, Hood Country Club was nominated for Album of the Year and Best Hip Hop Artist at the New Zealand Music Awards, while "Fit In" was nominated for Single of the Year. In 2020 and 2021, Dallas released standalone tracks including "Training Montage" and "42 Below". "42 Below" reached number two on the Hot 20 Aotearoa Singles chart in 2021.

=== 2024–present: Vita ===
Dallas released the EP Vita in 2024. The title is an abbreviation of his Samoan name Tavita. Pacific Music Awards material described the project as a return home, written while Dallas was based back in the South Auckland house where he grew up following the death of his brother. The project was produced by 41, Dallas's former Frontline collaborator.

Vita reached number 23 on the New Zealand Albums Chart and number six on the New Zealand Artists Albums Chart. The single "All Gas" reached number 14 on the Hot 20 Aotearoa Singles chart.

In December 2024, Dallas toured the project in New Zealand on the Fafo: Vita tour with PNC. At the 2025 Aotearoa Music Awards, he won Best Hip Hop Artist for Vita. He was also nominated for Best Pacific Hip Hop Artist at the 2025 Pacific Music Awards.

In 2025, Dallas and American rapper Oddisee released "Midas", which reached number five on the Hot 20 Aotearoa Singles chart.

== Artistry and themes ==
Dallas's music is rooted in hip hop and often reflects South Auckland life, cultural identity, ambition, self-doubt, family, sport and the pressure of success. His early career with Frontline placed him within the Dirty Records and early-2000s New Zealand hip-hop movement, while his solo career expanded into international collaborations through Duck Down Music and United States recording sessions.

In a 2015 AudioCulture interview, Dallas described early home recording, hip-hop forums and online music communities as crucial to how he began making music. He also discussed the emotional weight of songs such as "Southside" and the importance of writing material that reflected his own experience. NZ Musician later described Hood Country Club as expanding his writing into questions of authenticity, identity and social pressure.

== Legacy and influence ==
Dallas is regarded as one of the major figures in modern New Zealand hip hop, first through Frontline and the Dirty Records era, then through solo albums including The Rose Tint and Falling into Place. The Spinoff described 64 Bars as a platform that helped expose a generation of New Zealand rappers to larger audiences, with Dallas acting as curator and mentor within the format.

Dallas's United States period also formed part of a wider internet-era push for New Zealand hip hop overseas. A 2016 Vice profile of P-Money described Dallas, P-Money, Fire & Ice and others as using online hip-hop networks, American media appearances, United States collaborations and touring to reach audiences outside New Zealand.

== Discography ==
=== With Frontline ===
Albums with Frontline
Title	Details	Peak chart position
Title	Details	NZ
What You Expect?	Released: 2001; Label: Independent; Format: CD	—
Borrowed Time	Released: 2005; Label: Dirty Records; Format: CD, digital	27

=== Solo albums ===
Solo albums, with selected chart positions
Title	Details	Peak chart position
Title	Details	NZ
Something Awesome	Released: 2009; Label: Dirty Records / Dawn Raid Entertainment; Format: CD, digital	20
The Rose Tint	Released: 2011; Label: Dirty Records / Dawn Raid Entertainment / Duck Down Music; Format: CD, digital, LP	3
Falling into Place	Released: 2013; Label: Dirty Records / Dawn Raid Entertainment / Duck Down Music; Format: CD, digital	2
Hood Country Club	Released: 2017; Label: Mean As Music; Format: CD, digital	10

=== Extended plays ===
Extended plays, with selected chart positions
Title	Details	Peak chart position
Title	Details	NZ
Something Now	Released: 2008; Label: Dirty Records; Format: Digital	—
Buffalo Man	Released: 2012; Label: Dirty Records / Dawn Raid Entertainment / Duck Down Music; Format: Digital	—
Vita	Released: 2024; Label: Hobby; Format: Digital, streaming, LP	23

=== Remix and other projects ===
Title	Year	Details	Ref.
Purple Tinted	2012	Remix project with 41 based on material from The Rose Tint.	
Loosies	2021	Collection of standalone tracks released by Dallas.	

=== Singles ===
Selected singles and chart positions
Year	Title	Artist credit	Peak chart positions		Certifications	Album / project
Year	Title	Artist credit	NZ	NZ Aotearoa	Certifications	Album / project
2005	"Breathe with Me"	Frontline	16	—	—	Borrowed Time
2006	"Lost in Translation"	Frontline	22	—	—	Borrowed Time
2009	"Indulge Me"	David Dallas featuring Devolo	34	—	—	Something Awesome
2013	"Don't Want the World"	David Dallas	—	11	—	Buffalo Man
2013	"Runnin'"	David Dallas	7	1	NZ: Platinum	Falling into Place
2013	"The Wire"	David Dallas featuring Ruby Frost	11	1	NZ: Gold	Falling into Place
2017	"Probably"	David Dallas	—	15	—	Hood Country Club
2017	"Fit In"	David Dallas	—	—	—	Hood Country Club
2020	"Training Montage"	David Dallas	—	—	—	Loosies
2021	"42 Below"	David Dallas	—	—	—	Loosies
2024	"All Gas"	David Dallas	—	—	—	Vita
2025	"Midas"	David Dallas and Oddisee	—	—	—	Non-album single

"—" denotes a recording that did not chart, was not released in that territory, or for which no reliable chart source has been identified.

== Awards and recognition ==
Year	Award	Work	Result	Ref.
2006	New Zealand Music Awards – Best Urban / Hip Hop Album	Borrowed Time with Frontline	Won	
2010	New Zealand Music Awards – Best Urban / Hip Hop Album	Something Awesome	Won	
2010	Taite Music Prize	Something Awesome	Shortlisted	
2011	New Zealand Music Awards – Album of the Year	The Rose Tint	Nominated	
2011	New Zealand Music Awards – Best Urban / Hip Hop Album	The Rose Tint	Nominated	
2012	Taite Music Prize	The Rose Tint	Shortlisted	
2012	Pacific Music Awards – Best Pacific Male Artist	The Rose Tint	Won	
2014	Taite Music Prize	Falling into Place	Finalist	
2014	New Zealand Music Awards – Best Male Solo Artist	Falling into Place	Won	
2014	New Zealand Music Awards – Best Urban / Hip Hop Album	Falling into Place	Won	
2014	Pacific Music Awards – Best Pacific Male Artist	Falling into Place	Won	
2014	Pacific Music Awards – Best Pacific Urban Artist	Falling into Place	Won	
2014	Pacific Music Awards – NZ On Air Radio Airplay Award	"Runnin'"	Won	
2017	New Zealand Music Awards – Album of the Year	Hood Country Club	Nominated	
2017	New Zealand Music Awards – Best Hip Hop Artist	Hood Country Club	Nominated	
2017	New Zealand Music Awards – Single of the Year	"Fit In"	Nominated	
2025	Aotearoa Music Awards – Best Hip Hop Artist	Vita	Won	
2025	Pacific Music Awards – Best Pacific Hip Hop Artist	Vita	Nominated	

== See also ==
- New Zealand hip hop
- Scribe (rapper)
- P-Money
- Dirty Records
- Dawn Raid Entertainment
- Duck Down Music
