= Pacific Music Awards =

Annual New Zealand music award

- Awarded for: Excellence in Pacific music in New Zealand
- Sponsored by: Vodafone NZ
- Location: Vodafone Events Centre, Auckland
- Country: New Zealand
- Presented by: Pacific Music Awards Committee
- First award: 2005
- Website: http://www.pacificmusicawards.org.nz

The Pacific Music Awards are an annual New Zealand music award ceremony since 2005 that honours excellence in Pacific music in New Zealand. The awards honour musicians who primarily work in the Pacific Island style of music from the Cook Islands, Fiji, Niue, Samoa, Tonga, Tokelau or Tuvalu, and also in urban and gospel genre categories.

== Organisation ==
The Pacific Music Awards are run by the Pacific Music Awards Committee, which was founded in 2004 with the goal of establishing and running an annual awards for the Pacific music community in New Zealand. The inaugural event was part of the Pasifika Festival, and after that has been separate. In 2008 a charitable trust was registered called the Pacific Music Awards Trust. In 2022 the Trust's Officers were: Sina Wendt, Petrina Togi-Sa'ena, Ngaire Fuata, Pati Umaga and the Reverend Muamua Strickson – Pua. The purpose is stated as: "To create and manage an event that acknowledges the success of Pacific artists, celebrates and promotes excellence in Pacific Music and encourages young Pacific musicians to aspire to a high level of achievement."

== Awards ==
As of the 2014, 12 awards are given. The Best Pacific Music Album award is part of the annual Recording Industry Association of New Zealand (RIANZ) New Zealand Music Awards. Previously called the Polynesian Music Tui award, the award was renamed and the presentation was moved to the Pacific Music Awards in 2005. The Tui trophy is one of three genre awards that are presented at specialist award ceremonies, separate from the main New Zealand Music Awards ceremony, however the winner is also recognised at the main NZMA ceremony later in the year.

The Pacific Music Awards also include the Lifetime Achievement Award, which is given to an individual or group who has made a significant contribution to Pacific music, and the Phillip Fuemana Most Promising Artist Award, which honours an upcoming individual or group.

== Ceremonies ==
=== 2005 Pacific Music Awards ===
The 2005 awards were held on Friday 11 March 2005 as part of the annual Pasifika Festival held in Western Springs, Auckland. Hip hop artist Tha Feelstyle won three of the six contestable awards. The Lifetime Achievement Award was given to producer and community figure Phil Fuemana, who died two weeks before the ceremony.

Winners and nominees

Best Pacific Female Artist Award	Best Pacific Male Artist
**Sara-Jane Auva'a – Sara-Jane**; Anna Williams – "Searching"; Kat Theo – "Waiting"	Sponsored by NZ Music Industry Commission: **Tha Feelstyle – Break It To Pieces**; Dei Hamo – "We Gon' Ride"; Scribe – "Dreaming"
Best Pacific Group	Best Pacific Urban Artist
Sponsored by Radio 531PI: **Adeaze – Always and for Real**; Ardijah – Journey (Aere"anga); D1 Family – Koko Luv	Sponsored by Niu FM: **Tha Feelstyle – Break It To Pieces**; Dei Hamo – We Gon' Ride; Scribe – Dreaming
APRA Best Pacific Song	Best Pacific Music Album — Tui Award
**Kas Futialo and Ian Seumanu – "Su'amalie"**; Nainz Tupa'i & Viiz Tupa'i – "Getting Stronger"; Ryan Monga – "Journey (Aere'anga)"	**Ardijah – Journey**; Aniseto Falemoe – Afe O Maila Ole Alofa; Ephraim – Moemoea o Avaiki
Lifetime Achievement Award
No finalists were announced in this category.: **Phillip Fuemana**

=== 2006 Pacific Music Awards ===
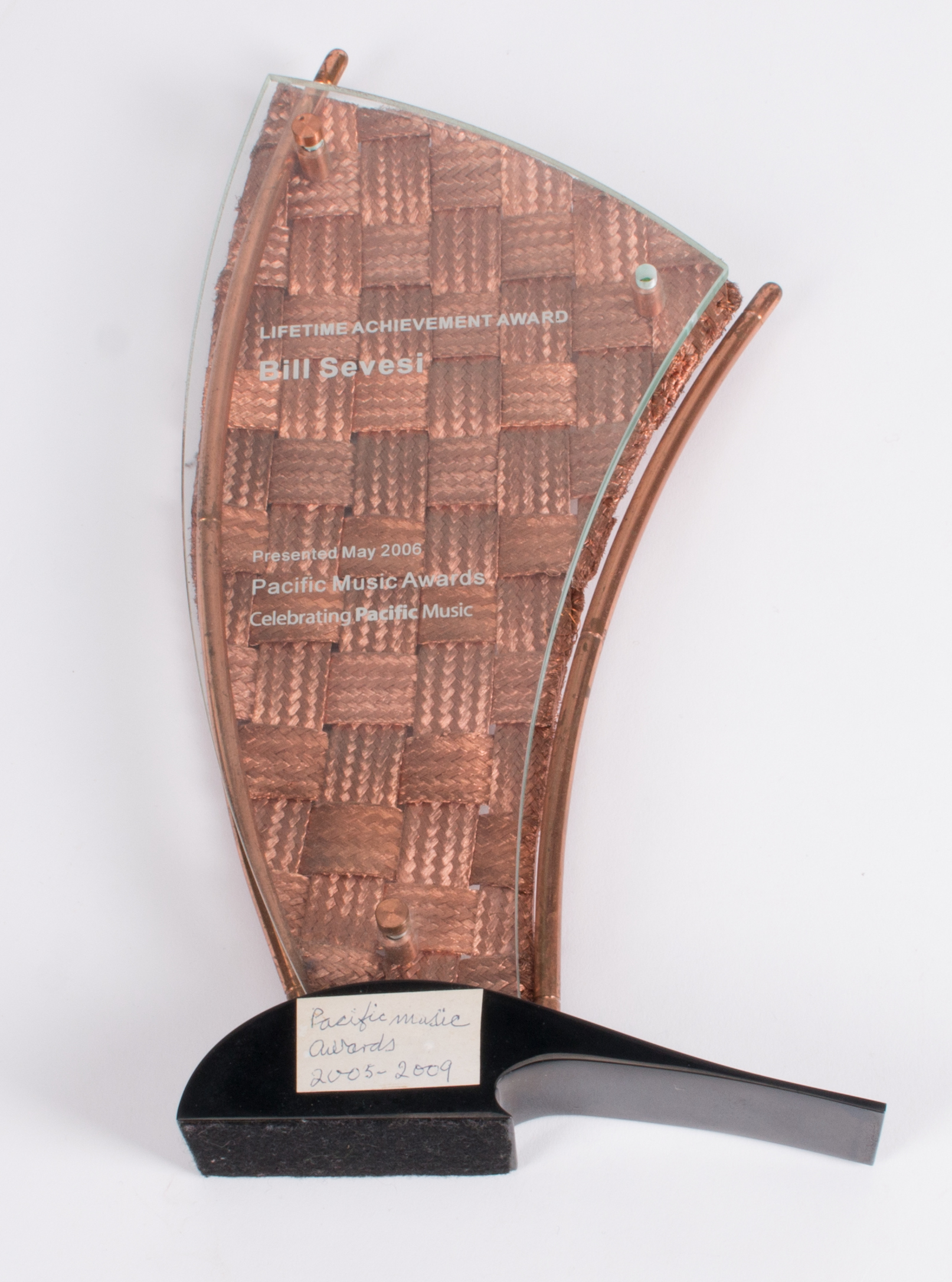
Lifetime Achievement Award awarded to Bill Sevesi, made from copper, glass and plastic to resemble a sail

The 2006 awards were held on Friday 12 May 2006 at the TelstraClear Pacific Events Centre in Manukau, Auckland. The awards were moved from March to May to coincide with New Zealand Music Month. No longer held as part of the Pasifika festival, the awards venue moved to the TelstraClear Pacific Events Centre in Manukau. The Phillip Fuemana Most Promising Artist Award was added, in honour of the late music producer.

Best Pacific Female Artist Award	Best Pacific Male Artist
**Annie Puletiuatoa – Childhood**; Rosita Vai – Golden; Sara-Jane Auva'a – Rejoice	Sponsored by NZ Music Industry Commission: **Dei Hamo – First Edition**; King Kapisi – Dominant Species; Savage – Moonshine
Best Pacific Group	Best Pacific Urban Artist
Sponsored by Radio 531PI: **Mt Vaea – Mama**; Beatrootz – "No DJz"; Cydel – "Luv Iz"	Sponsored by Niu FM: **Dei Hamo – First Edition**; King Kapisi – Dominant Species; Savage – Moonshine
APRA Best Pacific Song	Best Pacific Music Album — Tui Award
**Savage – "Swing"**; Beatrootz – "No DJz"; Cydel – "Luv Iz"	**Mt Vaea Band – Mama**; JXN & LavaBoyKila – First off the Blane; Annie Puletiuatoa – Childhood
Lifetime Achievement Award	Phillip Fuemana Most Promising Artist Award
No finalists were announced in this category.: **Bill Sevesi**	No finalists were announced in this category.: **Richard Recalde**

=== 2007 Pacific Music Awards ===
The 2007 awards were held on Thursday 31 May 2007 at the TelstraClear Pacific Events Centre in Manukau, Auckland. Boy band Spacifix won three of the six contestable awards.

Best Pacific Female Artist Award	Best Pacific Male Artist
Sponsored by Counties Manukau DHB/Smokefree: Aaradhna — I Love You; Sara-Jane Auva"a – Merry Christmas; Sara Halatutavaha – Tau Fuata Niue	Sponsored by NZ Music Industry Commission: **Chong Nee – "Just Getting By On Love"**; JXN – "Fuata Niue"; PNC – Rookie Card
Best Pacific Group	Best Pacific Urban Artist
Sponsored by Radio 531PI: **Spacifix – Much Love**; Ill Semantics – Good Musik; Nesian Mystik – Freshmen	Sponsored by Niu FM: **Chong Nee – Just Getting By On Love**; Ill Semantics – Good Musik; PNC – Rookie Card
APRA Best Pacific Song	Best Pacific Music Album — Tui Award
**Spacifix – "Gotta Get Like This"**; Aaradhna – "I Love You Too"; Vaniah Toloa – "Tukua"	**Spacifix – Much Love**; Amene – In Your Name We Pray; Vaniah Toloa – Tukua
Lifetime Achievement Award	Phillip Fuemana Most Promising Artist Award
No finalists were announced in this category.: **The Yandall Sisters**	No finalists were announced in this category.: **Vela Manusaute**

=== 2008 S^{3} Pacific Music Awards ===
From 2008 to 2010, the awards were known as the S^{3} Pacific Music Awards, with the Pacific road safety organisation S^{3} the naming-rights sponsor for three years. The 2008 awards were held on Thursday 29 May 2008 at the TelstraClear Pacific Events Centre in Manukau. A new People's Choice category was added to the awards, with the public voting on the shortlist of all finalists on the PMA website.

Best Pacific Female Artist Award	Best Pacific Male Artist
Sponsored by Pacific Blue: **Lole – The Movement**; Delani – "Butterflies"; Zeisha Fremaux – "Secret Game"	Sponsored by NZ Music Commission: **Scribe – Rhyme Book**; Kas Futialo – Lokokasi; Vaniah Toloa – E Le Galo Oe
Best Pacific Group	Best Pacific Urban Artist
Sponsored by Radio 531PI: **Te Vaka – Olatia**; Three Houses Down – Dreadtown; Cydel – Soul Finder	Sponsored by Niu FM: **Cydel – Soul Finder**; PNC – "P-N-Whoa!"; Scribe – Rhyme Book
APRA Best Pacific Song	Best Pacific Music Album — Tui Award
**Scribe – "Say It Again"** **(Luafutu/Hammond/Iusitini/Iusitini/Mushroom Music Publishing)**; Three Houses Down – "DandyMan" (Puriri/Pome'e); Ill Semantics feat. Adeaze – "Take It Slow" (Arona/Moore/Tupa"i/Tupa"i/Holmes)	Sponsored by S³: **Te Vaka – Olatia**; Three Houses Down – Dreadtown; Cydel – Soul Finder
People's Choice Best Pacific Artist Award	Lifetime Achievement Award
Sponsored by Manukau City Council No finalists were announced in this category.: **Three Houses Down**	Sponsored by Manukau Institute of Technology No finalists were announced in this category.: **Sione Aleki**
Phillip Fuemana Most Promising Artist Award
No finalists were announced in this category.: **Matthew Salapu-Faiumu**

=== 2009 S^{3} Pacific Music Awards ===
The 2009 S^{3} Pacific Music Awards were held on Saturday 23 May 2009 at the TelstraClear Pacific Events Centre in Manukau, Auckland. Pop group Nesian Mystik won the most awards, with four wins. An award for Best Pacific Gospel Album was added to the honours.

Best Pacific Female Artist Award	Best Pacific Male Artist
Sponsored by Pacific Blue: **Ladi6 – Time Is Not Much**; Angela Afeaki – Tongan Rendezvous; Iva Lamkum – Iva Lamkum EP	Sponsored by NZ Music Commission: **Devolo – Heaven & Hell**; Mareko – White Sunday 2: The Book of Mark; Vince Harder – "Strobe Light"
Best Pacific Group	Best Pacific Urban Artist
Sponsored by Radio 531PI: **Nesian Mystik – Elevator Musiq**; Cydel – "There"s a Place"; Horsemen Family – My Shout	Sponsored by Niu FM: **Nesian Mystik – Elevator Musiq**; **Devolo – Heaven & Hell**; Ladi6 – Time Is Not Much
APRA Best Pacific Song	Best Pacific Music Album — Tui Award
**Nesian Mystik – "Nesian 101"** **(Atai/Manukau/McNulty/Reeder/Rikiau/Strickson‐Pua)**; Angela Afeaki – "Happy Happy Tonga" (A. Afeaki/W. Afeaki/J. Afeaki); Ladi6 – "Walk Right Up" (K. Tamati/B. Park)	Sponsored by S³: **Nesian Mystik – "Elevator Musiq"**; Angela Afeaki – "Tongan Rendezvous"; Ladi6 – "Time is Not Much"
Best Pacific Gospel Album	People's Choice Best Pacific Artist Award
**Oyster Music (Various Artists) – The Gospel According to...**; St Pauls Methodist Church Otara – 2008 Choir; South Auckland Community Church Band – Set Us Free	Sponsored by Manukau City Council: **South Auckland Community Church Band**; Angela Afeaki; Cydel; Devolo; Horsemen Family; Iva Lamkum; Ladi6; Mareko; Nesian Mystik; Oyster Entertainment; St Paul's Methodist Church Otara; Vince Harder
Lifetime Achievement Award	Phillip Fuemana Most Promising Artist Award
Sponsored by Manukau Institute of Technology: **Tigilau Ness**	No finalists were announced in this category.: **Sweet & Irie**

=== 2010 S^{3} Pacific Music Awards ===
The 2010 S^{3} Pacific Music Awards were held on Saturday 29 May 2010 at the TelstraClear Pacific Events Centre in Auckland. South Auckland group Three Houses Down took out two prizes. The People's Choice Award was not given in 2010 due to "an irregularity in the voting which compromised the results." A new prize was introduced for the most Radio Airplay.

Best Pacific Female Artist Award	Best Pacific Male Artist
Sponsored by Pacific Blue: **Erakah – "Wonderful"**; Bella Kalolo – "Walk To Change"; MzJ -" That Gurl"	Sponsored by NZ Music Commission: **J. Williams – Young Love**; Malcolm Lakatani – Quote Unquote; Savage – Savage Island
Best Pacific Group	Best Pacific Urban Artist
Sponsored by Radio 531PI: **Te Vaka – Haoloto**; Smashproof – The Weekend; Three Houses Down – Break Out	Sponsored by Niu FM: **Savage – Savage Island**; J. Williams – Young Love; Smashproof – The Weekend
APRA Best Pacific Song	Best Pacific Music Album — Tui Award
**Three Houses Down – "Kanikapila" (Tonga Vaea & Three Houses Down)**; Malcolm Lakatani – "Nukututaha" (Malcolm Lakatani/Napa Lakatani); Te Vaka – "Te Mavaega" (Opetaia Foa"i)	Sponsored by S³: **Three Houses Down – Break Out**; Savage – Savage Island; Te Vaka – Haoloto
Best Pacific Gospel Album	Radio Airplay Award
Sponsored by Manukau City Council: **Ivoga Green & Niu Ta"ala – Quiet Intensity**; Mutalau Ululauta Matahefonua Trust - Taofi Lologo Tolu, Tau Lologo Tapu Tokiofa Mutalau"; Purpose Defined – Called To Battle	Sponsored by NZ On Air No finalists were announced in this category.: **Smashproof – "Brother"**
Lifetime Achievement Award	Phillip Fuemana Most Promising Artist Award
Sponsored by Manukau Institute of Technology No finalists were announced in this category.: **Ardijah**	No finalists were announced in this category.: **Luap**

=== 2011 Polynesian Blue Pacific Music Awards ===
In 2011 the awards were known as the Polynesian Blue Pacific Music Awards after airline Polynesian Blue became the naming rights sponsor. The awards were held on 28 May 2011 at the TelstraClear Pacific Events Centre. A new award for Best Pacific Language was introduced.

Best Pacific Female Artist Award	Best Pacific Male Artist
Sponsored by Nautilus Foundation: **Ladi6 – The Liberation Of...**; Bella Kalolo – "What Love Can Do"; Erakah – "In or Out"	Sponsored by NZ Music Commission: **Vince Harder – "Say This With Me"**; J. Williams – "You Got Me"; Young Sid – What Doesn"t Kill Me
Best Pacific Group	Best Pacific Urban Artist
Sponsored by Radio 531PI: **Nesian Mystik – 99AD**; The Hypnotics – The Hypnotics EP; Pacific Underground – Island Summer	Sponsored by Niu FM: **Ladi6 – The Liberation Of...**; Nesian Mystik – 99AD; Vince Harder – "Say This With Me"
APRA Best Pacific Song	Best Pacific Music Album — Tui Award
**Nesian Mystik – "Sun Goes Down"** **(D Atai/V Rikiau/H Manukau/D McNulty/Te A Reeder, F Strickson-Pua)**; Adeaze – "Got My Girl For Life" (F Tupaa"i/L Tupaa"i); Tha Feelstyle – "Sometimes When It Rains" (K Futialo/J Ferguson/N Ngatae/F Tupaa"i/L Tupaa"i)	Sponsored by Polynesian Blue: **Nesian Mystik – 99AD**; Ladi6 – The Liberation Of...; Pacific Underground – Island Summer
Best Pacific Gospel Album	Radio Airplay Award
**Mutalau Ululauta Matahefonua Trust Choir -** **Lologo Tapu Tokiofa Mutalau – Niue. Taofi Lologo 4**; Harbourside & Various Artists – A Very Kiwi Christmas; JMA Productions & Various Artists – Reflections of the Soul	No finalists were announced in this category.: **J. Williams feat Scribe for "You Got Me"**
Best Pacific Language	Peoples Choice Best Pacific Artist Award
Sponsored by Tagata Pasifika: **Koile – "Te Hua"**; Pacific Underground – Island Summer; Taura Mani – I Runga Taua	Sponsored by Auckland Council: **Nesian Mystik**; Adeaze; Bella Kalolo; Erakah; Harbourside & Various Artists; The Hypnotics; J. Williams; JMA Productions & Various Artists; Koile; Ladi6; Mutalau Ululauta Matahefonua Trust Choir; Pacific Underground; Taura Mani; Tha Feelstyle; Vince Harder; Young Sid
Lifetime Achievement Award	Phillip Fuemana Most Promising Artist Award
Sponsored by Manukau Institute of Technology No finalists were announced in this category.: **Annie Crummer**	No finalists were announced in this category.: **Grace Ikenasio**

=== 2012 Pacific Music Awards ===
The 2012 awards were held on 31 May 2012 at the TelstraClear Pacific Events Centre in Auckland. Auckland R&B duo Adeaze won three awards. The 2012 awards did not have a naming-rights sponsor. The Radio Airplay Award category was dropped from the awards.

Best Pacific Female Artist Award	Best Pacific Male Artist
Sponsored by Nautilus Foundation: **Bella Kalolo – Without the Paper**; Iva Lamkum – "Raise Your Glass"; MzJ – Love Changes Everything	Sponsored by NZ Music Commission: **David Dallas – The Rose Tint**; Kas Futialo – Good Morning Samoa; Stks – Rhythm & Brown
Best Pacific Group	Best Pacific Urban Artist
Sponsored by Radio 531PI: **Adeaze – Rise & Shine**; Te Vaka – Havili; The Hypnotics – "Coincidence"	Sponsored by Niu FM: **Adeaze – Rise & Shine**; David Dallas – The Rose Tint; Stks – Rhythm & Brown
APRA Best Pacific Song	Best Pacific Music Album — Tui Award
**Adeaze – "Paradise" (F Tupa'i/L Tupa'i)**; David Dallas – "Take A Picture" (D Dallas/A Iustini/J Iustini/T Rowlands/E Simons); Ria – "Over You" (A Numia/E Ensink)	Sponsored by Polynesian Blue: **Kas Futialo – "Good Morning Samoa"**; Adeaze – Rise & Shine; David Dallas – The Rose Tint
Best Pacific Gospel Album	Best Pacific Language
**Mutalau Ululauta Matahefonua Trust Choir -** **"Lologo Tapu Tokiofa Mutalau Niue – Taofi Lologo 5"**; Erakah – "Infatuated"; Samoan Autalavou P.I.P.C. Newton – "Lota Nu'u Moni"	Sponsored by Tagata Pasifika: **Kas Futialo – "Good Morning Samoa"**
Peoples Choice Best Pacific Artist Award
Sponsored by Auckland Council: **Ria**; 2PouzFynist; Adeaze; Bella Kalolo; David Dallas; Iva Lamkum; Kas Futialo; Mutalau Ulalauta Matahenfonua Trust Choir; MzJ; P.I.P.C. Newton – Samoan Autalavou; Stks; Te Vaka; The Hypnotics
Lifetime Achievement Award	Phillip Fuemana Most Promising Artist Award
Sponsored by Manukau Institute of Technology No finalists were announced in this category.: **Keil Isles**	No finalists were announced in this category.: **Giant Killa**

=== 2013 Pasefika Proud Pacific Music Awards ===
The 2013 awards were held on 30 May 2013 at the TelstraClear Pacific Events Centre in Auckland. From 2013 the awards are known as the Pasefika Proud Pacific Music Awards, with the government-run Family & Community Services community support programme Pasefika Proud the new naming-rights sponsor. The Best Pacific Gospel Album was dropped from the 2013 awards, the Radio Airplay Award category was added back, and new category Best Pacific Music Video was added. The theme for the year's awards is "honouring Pacific women". The awards were dominated by Aaradhna, who won six awards.

Winners are listed first and highlighted in boldface.

Best Pacific Female Artist Award	Best Pacific Male Artist
Sponsored by Nautilus Foundation: **Aaradhna – Treble & Reverb**; Iva Lamkum – Black Eagle; Ria – The One	Sponsored by NZ Music Commission: **Swiss – Slow Wind**; Savage – Mayhem & Miracles; Vaniah Toloa – Tofi O Tamatane
Best Pacific Group	Best Pacific Urban Artist
Sponsored by Radio 531PI: **Tomorrow People – One**; Home Brew – Home Brew; The Hypnotics – Give It Time	Sponsored by Niu FM: **Aaradhna – Treble & Reverb**; Iva Lamkum – Black Eagle; Swiss – Slow Wind
APRA Best Pacific Song	Best Pacific Music Album — Tui Award
**Aaradhna – Wake Up**; Iva Lamkum – Doo Bop; Swiss – Slow Wind	Sponsored by Pasefika Proud: **Aaradhna – Treble & Reverb**; Home Brew – Home Brew; Tomorrow People – One
Best Pacific Language	Best Pacific Music Video
Sponsored by Tagata Pasifika: **Vaniah Toloa – Tofi O Tamatane**; Mangere Congregational Church of Jesus – Ia Outou Vivi'I; Mr Tanoa – My Sweat & Tears	Sponsored by NZ On Air: **Aaradhna – Lorena Bobbitt**; Iva Lamkum – Doo Bop; Vince Harder – Far From Here
Radio Airplay Award	Peoples Choice Best Pacific Artist Award
Sponsored by NZ On Air: 1. **Aaradhna – "Wake Up"**; 2. Brooke Fraser "Something in the Water"; 3. Swiss "Slow Wind"; 4. Deach feat. Jae'O "Slow It Down"; 5. Donell Lewis feat. Fortafy "Missing My Love"	Sponsored by Auckland Council: **Swiss – Slow Wind**; Aaradhna – Treble & Reverb; Home Brew – Home Brew; Iva Lamkum – Black Eagle; Mangere Congregational Church of Jesus – Ia Outou Vivi'I; Mr Tanoa – My Sweat & Tears; Ria – The One; Savage – Mayhem & Miracles; The Hypnotics – Give It Time; Tomorrow People – One; Vaniah Toloa – Tofi O Tamatane; Vince Harder – Far From Here
Lifetime Achievement Award	Phillip Fuemana Most Promising Artist Award
No finalists were announced in this category.: **Mavis Rivers**	No finalists were announced in this category.: **Cilla**

=== 2014 Vodafone Pacific Music Awards ===
The 2014 awards were held on Thursday 8 May 2014 at the Vodafone Events Centre (the new name of the TelstraClear Pacific Events Centre) in Auckland. The awards were known as the Vodafone Pacific Music Awards, with Vodafone New Zealand as the new naming-rights sponsor. The Radio Airplay award was again dropped from the 2014 awards, and the new category Best International Pacific Artist was added. The event celebrated the 10th anniversary of the awards.

Winners are listed first and highlighted in boldface.

Best Pacific Female Artist Award	Best Pacific Male Artist
Sponsored by Trillian Trust: **Bella Kalolo – Time and Space**; Ladi6 – Automatic; MzJ – You Make Me Smile	Sponsored by NZ Music Commission: **David Dallas – Falling Into Place**; Mark Vanilau – Dark Horizon; Swiss – Lucky Man
Best Pacific Group	Best Pacific Urban Artist
Sponsored by Radio 531PI: **Sol3 Mio – Sol3 Mio**; BrownHill – First Love; Tomorrow People – One.5	Sponsored by Niu FM: **David Dallas – Runnin'**; King Kapisi – "Crush"; Ladi6 – "Ikarus"
Best Pacific Song	Best Pacific Music Album — Tui Award
Sponsored by APRA: **Mark Vanilau – "Giant of the Sea"**; David Dallas – Runnin'; Ladi6 – "Ikarus"	Sponsored by Auckland Council: **Sol3 Mio – Sol3 Mio**; David Dallas – Falling Into Place; Ladi6 – Automatic
Best Pacific Language	Best Pacific Music Video
Sponsored by Tagata Pasifika: **Kelemete & Kiligi Ta"ale – Penina Lalelei o Samoa**; Fiafia Band – "Pepelo"; YFC Alumni NZ Choir – "Amuia le Tagata"	Sponsored by NZ On Air: **King Kapisi – "Crush"**; David Dallas – Runnin'; Ladi6 – "Ikarus"
Best International Pacific Artist Award	Peoples Choice Best Pacific Artist Award
Sponsored by Flava: **Fiji Born & Raised II – "The ReBirth"**; Kalaga'la – "Aimons Nous"; Spawnbreezie – "Perfect"	Sponsored by Vodafone NZ: **Lifestyle**
Lifetime Achievement Award	Phillip Fuemana Most Promising Artist Award
Sponsored by Manukau Institute of Technology No finalists were announced in this category.: **Che Fu**	No finalists were announced in this category.: **Musical Island Boys**

=== 2015 Vodafone Pacific Music Awards ===
The 2015 awards were held on Saturday 13 June at the Vodafone Events Centre. Auckland duo Cydel won three awards and rap trio Smashproof won two awards. The Radio Airplay Award was brought back and a Special Recognition Award was presented to popera trio Sol3 Mio.

Winners are listed first and highlighted in boldface.

Best Pacific Female Artist Award	Best Pacific Male Artist
Sponsored by Virgin Australia: **Erakah – Organised Chaos**; Lole Usoalii-Hickey – "Get Over"; Mz J – "Sparkle"	Sponsored by NZ Music Commission: **TJ Taotua – Magnified**; K.One – "I Wanna Tell You"; King Kapisi – "Welcome Back"
Best Pacific Group	Best Pacific Urban Artist
Sponsored by Radio 531PI: **Cydel – Memoirs of a Midnight Cowboy**; Three Houses Down – "On My Heart"; Tomorrow People – "Again & Again"	Sponsored by Niu FM: **Cydel – Memoirs of a Midnight Cowboy**; Sid Diamond – "Speakers Blown"; Team Dynamite – Shepherds Delight
Best Pacific Song	Best Pacific Music Album — Tui Award
Sponsored by APRA: **Smashproof – "Survivors"**; Andrew Faleatua – "Samoa Forever"; Cydel – "I Love You"; Team Dynamite – "Coconut Lime"	Sponsored by Recorded Music NZ: **Cydel – Memoirs of a Midnight Cowboy**; Team Dynamite – Shepherds Delight; Fiafia Band – Siva Siva Maia
Best Pacific Language	Best Pacific Music Video
Sponsored by Tagata Pasifika: **Word of Life South Auckland Choir – "Toele I La'u auaunaga"**; Aumua Toafa Ai'i Te'o – "It"s my turn – O lo'u taimi"; Fiafia Band – "Siva Siva Maia"	Sponsored by NZ On Air: **Smashproof – "Survivors" (Director Chris Graham)**; Coco Solid – "Heaven's Gate" (Director Coco Solid); Team Dynamite – "Coconut Lime" (Director Eddy Fifield)
Best International Pacific Artist Award	Peoples Choice Best Pacific Artist Award
Sponsored by Flava: **Maryanne Ito – "Waking Up"**; Common Kings – "Before You Go"; Mahi – "Kissing You"	Sponsored by Vodafone NZ: **Three Houses Down – "On My Heart"**; Andrew Faleatua – "Samoa Forever"; Aumua Toafa Ai'i Te'o – "Its my turn – O lo'u taimi"; Coco Solid – "Heaven"s Gate"; Common Kings – "Before You Go"; Cydel – "Memoirs of a Midnight Cowboy"/"I Love You"; Erakah – "Organised Chaos"; Fiafia Band – "Siva Siva Maia"; K.One – "I Wanna Tell You"; King Kapisi – "Welcome Back"; Lifestyle (of Worship) – "Your Will Be Done"; Lole Usoalii-Hickey – "Get Over"; Mahi – "Kissing You"; Maryanne Ito – "Waking Up"; Mz J – "Sparkle"; Sid Diamond – "Speakers Blown"; Smashproof – "Survivors"; Team Dynamite – "Shepherds Delight"/"Coconut Lime"; TJ Taotua – "Magnified"; Tomorrow People – "Again & Again"; Word of Life South Auckland Choir – "Toele I La'u auaunaga"
Lifetime Achievement Award	Phillip Fuemana Most Promising Artist Award
Sponsored by Manukau Institute of Technology No finalists were announced in this category.: **Herbs**	No finalists were announced in this category.: **Donell Lewis**
Special Recognition Award	Radio Airplay Award
No finalists were announced in this category.: **Sol3 Mio**	Sponsored by NZ On Air No finalists were announced in this category.: **Brooke Fraser – "Kings + Queens"**

=== 2016 Vodafone Pacific Music Awards ===
The 2016 awards were held on Thursday 9 June at the Vodafone Events Centre. The theme for 2016 was "Don't forget your history, nor your destiny". R&B singer Vince Harder won three awards, and Pacific performance group Te Vaka won two. The Best Pacific Gospel Artist category was awarded for the first time since 2012, and new category Best Producer was added to the awards.

Winners are listed first and highlighted in boldface.

Best Pacific Female Artist Award	Best Pacific Male Artist
Sponsored by Virgin Australia: **Annie Grace – The Journey**; Rosie – Everything"s Rosie; Tree – "Sweet Lovin"	Sponsored by NZ Music Commission: **Vince Harder – Rare Vision**; Beau Monga – "King and Queen"; K.One – Out of Thin Air
Best Pacific Group	Best Pacific Urban Artist
Sponsored by Radio 531PI: **Sol3 Mio – On Another Note**; Te Vaka – Amataga; Tomorrow People – Bass & Bassinets	Sponsored by Niu FM: **Vince Harder – Rare Vision**; Beau Monga – "King and Queen"; Ill Semantics – Trillogy
Best Pacific Song	Best Pacific Music Album — Tui Award
Sponsored by APRA: **Te Vaka – "Papua I Sisifo" (written by Opetaia Foa"i)**; Annie Grace – "E Le Galo" (written by Annie Tonumali"i and Pearl Va"afusuaga); Mal Lakatani – "Fiti Lagakali" (written by Mekemiliani Ikinepule and Malakamu Lakatani)	Sponsored by Recorded Music NZ: **Te Vaka – Amataga**; Annie Grace – The Journey; Sol3 Mio – On Another Note
Best Pacific Language	Best Pacific Gospel Artist
Sponsored by SunPix: **Tha Feelstyle – "Sasa"**; Mal Lakatani – "Fiti Lagakali"; Te Vaka – Amataga	**TJ Taotua – "Firstly"**; Annie Grace – The Journey; Revere – "Set Apart"
Best Pacific Music Video	Best Producer
**Team Dynamite – "Cosmos ReUp" (Directed by Eddy Fifield)**; K.One – "So Good" (Directed by Kaleb Vitale & Mark Arona); Vince Harder – "Shot Me Down" (Directed by Shae Sterling)	Sponsored by MAINZ: **Vince Harder with "Start Again"/Rare Vision (produced by Vince Harder)**; Ill Semantics – Trillogy (produced by Nox, Yorel, CXL); K.One – Out of Thin Air (produced by Nox); Rosie – Everything"s Rosie (produced by Dee Letoa); Tomorrow People – Bass & Bassinets (produced by Avina Kelekolio & Tana Tupai)
Best International Pacific Artist Award	Radio Airplay Award
**Common Kings – Hits & Mrs**; Ezra James – "Runaway"; Makisi – "Famili"	Sponsored by Flava: **Savage with "Freaks"**
Lifetime Achievement Award	Phillip Fuemana Most Promising Artist Award
Sponsored by Manukau Institute of Technology No finalists were announced in this category.: **Pacific Underground**	No finalists were announced in this category.: **Mikey Mayz**
Special Recognition Award	Special Recognition Award
No finalists were announced in this category.: **Savage**	No finalists were announced in this category.: **Linda and Vika Bull**
Peoples Choice Best Pacific Artist Award
Sponsored by Vodafone NZ: **Ill Semantics – Trillogy**; Annie Grace – The Journey; Beau Monga – "King and Queen"; Common Kings – Hits & Mrs; Ezra James – "Runaway"; K.One – Out of Thin Air; Makisi – "Famili"; Mal Lakatani – "Fiti Lagakali"; Revere – "Set Apart"; Rosie – Everything"s Rosie; Sol3 Mio – On Another Note; Team Dynamite – "Cosmos ReUp"; Te Vaka – Amataga; Tha Feelstyle – "Sasa"; TJ Taotua – "Firstly"; Tomorrow People – Bass & Bassinets; Tree – "Sweet Lovin"; Vince Harder – Rare Vision

=== 2017 awards ===
- **Best Pacific Group** – Three Houses Down
- **Best Pacific Male Artist** – KINGS
- **Best Pacific Female Artist** – Aaradhna
- **Best Pacific Urban Artist** – KINGS
- **Best Pacific Song** – 'Brown Girl' by Aaradhna
- **Best Pacific Language Song** – 'Tulou Tagaloa' by Olivia Foa'i
- **Best Pacific Gospel Artist** – Annie Grace
- **Best Pacific Music Video** – 'Welcome to the Jungle' – Aaradhna. Directed by Sophie Findlay
- **Best International Pacific Artist** – J Boog
- **Best Producer** – KINGS
- **NZ on Air Radio Airplay Award** – KINGS
- **Lifetime Achievement Award** – Brother Love
- **Phil Fuemana Award for Most Promising Artist** – Tommy Nee
- **People's Choice Best Pacific Artist Award** – Three Houses Down ft General Fiyah
- **Special Recognition Award** – Outstanding Achievement – Opetaia Foa'i

=== 2018 awards ===
- Best Pacific Female Artist Award: Ladi6 "Royal Blue 3000 EP"
- NZ Music Commission Best Pacific Male Artist Award: Noah Slee "Otherland"
- Pacific Media Network Best Pacific Urban Artist Award: Noah Slee "Otherland"
- Pacific Media Network Best Pacific Group Award: Tomorrow People "Lock Me Up"
- NZ On Air Best Pacific Music Video Award: Samson Rambo "Here To Stay"
- APRA Best Pacific Song Award: General Fiyah "Here To Stay"
- SunPix Best Pacific Language: Tomorrow People "Sa"ili Le Alofa"
- Auckland Council Best Pacific Gospel Artist Award: EFKS Te Atatu Junior Youth – "Fa"afetai Le Atua"
- Flava Best International Pacific Artist Award: Tenelle "For The Lovers"
- Recorded Music NZ Best Pacific Music Album Award: Ladi6 "Royal Blue 3000 EP"
- SIT/MAINZ Best Producer Award: Parks, Brandan Haru & Julien Dyne "Royal Blue 3000 EP"
- Vodafone People's Choice Award: General Fiyah
- NZ On Air Radio Airplay Award: Brooke Fraser "Therapy"
- NZ On Air Streaming Award: Kings "We"ll Never Know"
- Philip Fuemana Most Promising Pacific Artist: Poetik
- Special Recognition Award For Outstanding Achievement: Otara Music & Arts Centre (OMAC)
- Manukau Institute of Technology Lifetime Achievement Award: Punialava"a

=== 2019 awards ===
- Auckland Council Best Pacific Female Artist Award: Razé – "Not About You"
- NZ Music Commission Best Pacific Male Artist Award: Kings – Lov3 & 3go
- PMN Best Pacific Group Award: Tomorrow People – BBQ Reggae
- PMN Best Pacific Gospel Artist Award: Adeaze – A Mother's Love
- Base FM NZ & Island Base FM Samoa Best Pacific Hip Hop Artist Award: SWIDT – The Most Electrifying
- Best Pacific Soul/RnB Artist Award: Razé – "Not About You"
- Pato Entertainment Best Pacific Roots/Reggae Artist: Tomorrow People – BBQ Reggae
- Flava Best International Pacific Artist Award: Jaro Local – Dakini Tangarareh
- SIT/MAINZ Best Producer Award: Kings & 10A – Lov3 & 3go
- NZ On Air Best Pacific Music Video: Villette "Money" – Directed by Parker Howell, Baron VR
- APRA Best Pacific Song: Kings – "6 Figures" Written by Kingdon Chapple-Wilson
- SunPix Best Pacific Language: Punialava"a Yesterday, Today & Tomorrow O ananafi, O nei ma Taeao
- Recorded Music NZ Best Pacific Music Album Award: Tomorrow People – BBQ Reggae
- Phillip Fuemana Award – Most Promising Pacific Artist: Melodownz
- NZ On Air Radio Airplay Award: WINNER: General Fiyah feat Three Houses Down – "Here To Stay"
- NZ On Air Streaming Award: Kings – "Don"t Worry About It"
- SunPix People's Choice Award – Best Pacific Artist: Tomorrow People
- Manukau Institute of Technology Lifetime Achievement Award: Her Majesty Queen Sālote Tupou lll

=== 2020 awards ===
- Best Pacific Female Artist: Olivia Foa"i – "Candid"
- Best Pacific Male Artist: Poetik – "Hamofied 2" EP
- Best Pacific Group: Church & AP – "Teeth"
- Best Pacific Music Video: Disciple Pati – The Boy Who Cried Woman
- Best Pacific Song: Lani Alo – Alo I Ou Faiva (written by Metitilani Alo & Livingstone Efu)
- Best Pacific Language: Olivia Foa"i – "Candid"
- Best Pacific Hip Hop Artist: Church & AP – "Teeth"
- Best Pacific Soul/R&B Artist: Jordan Gavet – "Hesitation"
- Best Pacific Roots/Reggae Artist: Tomorrow People – Fever feat. Fiji
- Best Pacific Gospel Artist: Lani Alo – Alo I Ou Faiva
- Best International Pacific Artist: Josh Tatofi
- Best Pacific Music Album: Olivia Foa"I – "Candid"
- Best Producer: Dera Meelan (Church & AP – "Teeth")
- Phillip Fuemana Award – Most Promising Pacific Artist: Victor J Sefo
- Radio Airplay Award: Church & AP – Ready or Not
- Streaming Award: Kings – 6 Figures
- People's Choice Award – Best Pacific Artist: HP Boyz
- Special Recognition Award: Jawsh685
- Lifetime Achievement Award: Daniel Rae Costello

=== 2021 awards ===
2021 Pacific Music Awards finalists and winners in bold.

AUCKLAND COUNCIL BEST PACIFIC FEMALE ARTIST

- **Jordan Gavet** – Do Better
- Lou"ana – "Moonlight Madness"
- Tree – "Mrs Tree"

NZ MUSIC COMMISSION BEST PACIFIC MALE ARTIST

- **Hawkins –** Can"t Leave It Alone/Streetlights/Fireflies/I Couldn"t Tell It All
- Kings – Help Me Out
- **Melodownz** – Fine

FLAVA BEST PACIFIC GROUP

- Church & AP – "At Thy Feet"
- **Shepherds Reign** – Aiga
- **STNDRD – "**Keep it STNDRD"
- **Team Dynamite –** Dragon Fruit ft. **Louis Baker**

NZ ON AIR BEST PACIFIC MUSIC VIDEO

- Kings – Help Me Out – directed by Kings
- Tree – Afio Ane Loa – directed by **Tree Manu & Quincy Filiga**
- **Vallé** – Trip Advisor – directed by **Jadon Calvert**

APRA BEST PACIFIC SONG

- Jawsh 685 – Savage Love (Laxed -Siren Beat) – written by **Joshua Nanai,** Phil Greiss, Jason Derulo, Jacob Kasher Hindlin
- Kings – Help Me Out – written by **Kingdon Chapple-Wilson, Matt Sadgrove, Sam Eriwata, Joel Latimer**
- Team Dynamite – Dragon Fruit ft Louis Baker – written by **Tony Sihamau, Lance Fepuleai, Harry Huavi,** Louis Baker

SUNPIX BEST PACIFIC LANGUAGE

- **Loopy Tunes Preschool Music –** Umukisia
- **Samson Squad –** Taviri/Manea/Te Kuki Airani
- Shepherds Reign – Aiga
- Tree – "Mrs Tree"

BASE FM NZ & ISLAND BASE FM SAMOA BEST PACIFIC HIP HOP ARTIST

- Church & AP – "At Thy Feet"
- **Diggy Dupé – "**That"s Me, That"s Team"
- Melodownz – Fine

BEST PACIFIC SOUL/R&B ARTIST

- **Emily Muli** – Self Care
- Lepani – "In the Moment"
- Lou"ana – "Moonlight Madness"

BEST PACIFIC ROOTS/REGGAE ARTIST

- **Lomez Brown** – "The Feels & Groove"
- **Raggadat Cris** – Nay Sayers
- **Victor J Sefo –** My Everything/Is It Bad/Want To/Like

531PI BEST PACIFIC GOSPEL ARTIST

- **Erakah** – How You Love Me
- **Marley Sola** – Lift Your Head High
- **TY** – Never Too Far/Drive

NIU FM BEST INTERNATIONAL PACIFIC ARTIST

- **DJ Noiz** – Amelia ft **Kennyon Brown, Donell Lewis,** Victor J Sefo
- **J Boog –** Siva Mai feat Siaosi
- **Mr Cowboy** – Daddy Toe Sau
- **Tenelle – "**This Is X"

RECORDED MUSIC NZ BEST PACIFIC MUSIC ALBUM

- Lepani – "In the Moment"
- Lou"ana – "Moonlight Madness"
- Tree – "Mrs Tree"

BEST PRODUCER

- Jawsh 685 – Savage Love (Laxed -Siren Beat) – producer: Jawsh 685
- Lepani – "In the Moment" – producers: Lepani, **Rory Noble, Ambian & Sleo, Devin Abrams**
- Lou"ana – "Moonlight Madness" – producer **Nathan Judd**

=== 2022 awards ===
2022 Pacific Music Awards finalists and winners in bold.

AUCKLAND COUNCIL BEST PACIFIC FEMALE ARTIST

- **Emily Muli – "Break"**
- Mo Etc. – Oceanbed
- Tree – "No Fear ft Junior Soqeta"

NZ MUSIC COMMISSION BEST PACIFIC MALE ARTIST

- Diggy Dupé – "WEON"
- **Kings** **- Raplist, "Young 4Eva"**
- Poetik – Poetik Justice

FLAVA BEST PACIFIC GROUP

- **SWIDT** – "**Seize the Day ft Savage", "Kelz Garage", "312 Day"**
- Team Dynamite – Respect The Process
- Tomorrow People – 21

NZ ON AIR BEST PACIFIC MUSIC VIDEO

- **Diggy Dupé, choicevaughan & P. Smith** **- "Ain't The Same ft. Melodownz & Summer Vaha'akolo" – Directed by Tom Hernv and Timēna Apa**
- House of Misfits – "Tā Te Manawa" – Directed by Abigail Dougherty
- Vallé – "Swing Low" – directed by Connor Pritchard

APRA BEST PACIFIC SONG

- Kings – "Young 4Eva" – written by Kingdon Chapple-Wilson
- Samson Squad – "Amene" – Written by Jacob Samson, Tautape Samson & Jayjay Samson
- **SWIDT – "Kelz Garage" – written by Daniel Latu, Amon McGoram, Isaiah Libeau, Lomez Brown, Samuel Verlinden**

SUNPIX BEST PACIFIC LANGUAGE

- **Kas Futialo – Grandmasta Kas**
- Lani Alo – "Tua i manu"
- Samson Squad – "Kainga", "Amene"
- Shepherds Reign – "Nga Ao E Rua feat. Swizl Jager""

BASE FM NZ & ISLAND BASE FM SAMOA BEST PACIFIC HIP HOP ARTIST

- Poetik – Poetik Justice
- **SWIDT – "Seize the Day ft Savage", "Kelz Garage", "312 Day"**
- Team Dynamite – Respect The Process

BEST PACIFIC SOUL/R&B ARTIST

- Emily Muli – "Break"
- **Sam V – "Wired", "Biker Boy"**
- TJ Taotua – Overdue

BEST PACIFIC ROOTS/REGGAE ARTIST

- Foundation – "Closer"
- Sammielz – "Okay"
- **Tomorrow People – 21**
- Victor J Sefo – "Pele Ea", "Ride", "Shots"

531PI BEST PACIFIC GOSPEL ARTIST

- **Anthem – Anthem**
- House of Misfits – "Tā Te Manawa"
- Tree – "No Fear ft Junior Soqeta"

NIU FM BEST INTERNATIONAL PACIFIC ARTIST

- Bina Butta & Kennyon Brown – "Lady Love"
- Jaro Local – "Kamanda Amanda", "First Time", "Single Papa", "25 Minutes"
- **Lisi – "Good Life", "Dreams", "Til the Death", "Baby We On"**

RECORDED MUSIC NZ BEST PACIFIC MUSIC ALBUM

- Diggy Dupé, choicevaughan & P. Smith – The Panthers OST
- Kings – Raplist
- **Tomorrow People – 21**

BEST PRODUCER

- **Diggy Dupé, choicevaughan & P. Smith – The Panthers OST – producers: Diggy Dupé, choicevaughan, P Smith**
- Team Dynamite – Respect The Process – producer: Harry (Haz Beats) Huavi
- Tomorrow People – 21– producers: IKON MUSIC – Avina Kelekolio, Hennie Tui, Tana Tupai

=== 2025 awards ===
The 2025 awards were held on 21 August at the Due Drop Events Centre in Manukau, Auckland.

- Best Pacific Female Artist: Aaradhna – Sweet Surrender
- Best Pacific Male Artist: Shane Walker – "Coasty Girl", "Maori in Me", "Iesu", "Let Me Be Your Man", "The Lord is Watching You", "Believe"
- Best Pacific Group: A.R.T – "When He Was Mine (Pele Fo'i Mai)", "Easy"
- Best Pacific Language: Opetaia Foa'i & Moana 2 Artists – "Tulou Tagaloa (Sei e Va"ai Mai)", "My Wish For You (Innocent Warrior), "Finding the Way", "Mana Vavau", "We"re Back (Te Vaka version), "Nuku O Kaiga"
- Best Pacific Gospel Artist: Brotherhood Musiq – 'Open The Eyes of My Heart'
- Best Pacific Hip Hop Artist: Kenzie from Welly – "Hold Ya Head", "Queendom"
- Best Pacific Soul/RnB Artist: Sam V – "90's Fine", "Rolling Your Eyes"
- Best Pacific Roots/Reggae Artist: Lomez Brown – UNDER-RATED
- Best Pacific Music Video: Tha Movement – "The Lecture", director Samson Rambo
- Best Producer: Astro, EDYONTHEBEAT, Sam V – "90's Fine", "Rolling Your Eyes", Sam V
- Best Pacific Song: Shane Walker "Believe"
- Best International Pacific Artist: The 046 – "Music is Everything", "Lifetime", "Young Free & Reckless", "Hustle Hard" "All In"
- Best Pacific Music Album: Jordyn with a Why – Hibiscus Moon, Love & Justice

=== 2026 awards ===
The 2026 awards were held on 12 August at the Due Drop Events Centre in Manukau, Auckland.

- Best Pacific Female Artist: Iva Lamkum – "Don't Mind If I Do"
- Best Pacific Male Artist: Sam V – Take A Chance On V: Deluxe, "Small Taste", "Pay No Mind"
- Best Pacific Group: A.R.T – Nana's Garage (EP), Blank Canvas (EP)
- Best Pacific Language: Taonepuna Lakatani, Malcolm Lakatani & Pacific Kids Learning –"Ulihega", "Vevela Mai He Lā"
- Best Pacific Gospel Artist: Signature Choir – Reach the Sky EP
- Best Pacific Hip Hop Artist: Kenzie from Welly – Greenstone Door
- Best Pacific Soul/RnB Artist: Sam V – Take A Chance On V: Deluxe, "Small Taste", "Pay No Mind"
- Best Pacific Roots/Reggae Artist: Three Houses Down – Lovers Roots EP
- Best Pacific Song: Sam V – "Small Taste"
- Best Pacific Music Video: Shepherds Reign – "Samoa Mo Samoa" (Director: Twayne Laumua)
- Best Producer: Brent Park-Tamati & Brandon Haru – Le Vā (Ladi6)
- Best International Pacific Artist: Fiji – "Daydream"
- Best Pacific Music Album: Scribe – Scribe is Dead
