= Noma Sio-Faiumu =

Samoan event producer and arts manager

- Born: 1950s Upolu, Samoa
- Occupations: Arts manager, events coordinator, administrator, community leader
- Notable work: APO (Auckland Philharmonia Orchestra) Remix the Orchestra (2013) & co-founder and managing director of 37hz Productions (2017 - present)
- Spouse: Matthew Sapalu-Faiumu (2012 - Present)
- Children: 3
- Awards: Special Recognition Award at Creative New Zealand's Pasifika Arts Awards (2017)
- Website: anonymouz.com

Noma Sio-Faiumu is an event producer and arts manager of Samoan descent based in Onehunga, New Zealand. She has worked for over 30 years as an arts administrator within the New Zealand arts industry. Her work is cross-cultural and spans a wide social spectrum facilitating multidisciplinary art projects independently and for leading arts organisations. Within arts administration, Sio-Faiumu served as the lead facilitator for the APO (Auckland Philharmonia Orchestra) Remix the Orchestra for a decade. The show received an International Music Council Musical Rights Award from the United Nations in 2013. Within the New Zealand music industry she is a founding member of the Pacific Music Awards (2005). She received a special recognition award at Creative New Zealand's Pasifika Arts Awards for her contributions within the Pacific community (2017).

== Early life ==
Born in the 1950s in Upolu, Samoa to Samoan parents from the villages of Satupuala and Lotofaga, Sio-Faiumu is one of nine siblings. Her family migrated to New Zealand in the late 1960s and settled in South Auckland. They settled after a journey from Samoa to Fiji on the Tofua boat, followed by a flight from Fiji to Auckland. They first lived in Māngere, then Ōtāhuhu, before settling in Ōtara when Sio-Faiumu was six years old.

Sio-Faiumu's earliest connection to the arts is her mother playing the piano around Christmas when she was young. Raised in a deeply religious Mormon-Catholic family that valued tradition and Fa'asamoa, she actively participated in church activities and sang in choirs. As a child, Sio-Faiumu helped her parents with their cleaning jobs. Her and her family would clean hotels like the Criterion and the Star Hotels in Ōtāhuhu.

Growing up in Ōtara, Sio-Faiumu's home became a pit stop for other families from her villages in Samoa who chose to migrate to New Zealand. Her family would assist them in finding jobs, completing visa papers, securing housing and provided meals. Despite facing dawn raids twice during her childhood, Sio-Faiumu was immersed in a diverse multicultural Pacific community. She learnt from community leaders like Terina Ricky and Tui Va Kolo. These experiences taught her the significance of honouring tradition and ancient processes from an early age.

She attended Mayfield Primary School, Beds Intermediate, and Sir Edmund Hillary College. During her time at Sir Edmund Hillary College, Sio-Faiumu joined a band named Karma and began her lifelong relationship with Otara Music and Arts Centre through a youth development program. Her itinerant teachers, Teina Bennioni and Peter Hoera, were local musicians respected in the Pasifika-South Auckland music scene.

== Biography ==
Upon leaving high school Sio-Faiumu became a vocalist for various live bands in the late 1980s to late 1990s. The bands would work a circuit that was both local and national which included places like Tamaki Tavern, the Tribesman pad, the Black Power pad, Duke Wellington and Cleos at the time. Prior to her becoming an arts manager, Sio-Faiumu cites while on tour with South Auckland band, the Emeralds, watching their female drummer and manager in negotiations with venue holders. During this time as an artist Sio-Faiumu had her first experience with arts management while on a national tour with a more prominent band. The first part of the band's tour was spent in their accommodation as their manager failed to inform venues that they would be performing. During a two-week layover in Masterton Sio-Faiumu was nominated by her band members to become the manager for the remainder of the tour, from Masterton to Invercargill and back to Auckland.

Following her work as a vocalist, in 1997 Sio-Faiumu began working as a centre coordinator for the Otara Music and Arts Centre. During this time she would have her first interaction and begin her friendship with her future husband and collaborator Matthew Salapu-Faiumu / Anonymouz. She would then leave in 2001 and take a job as creative director of Wahine Malosi Charitable Trust until 2005. Alongside other prominent people within the Pacific music community Sio-Faiumu founded the annual Pacific Music Awards (2005). She also began serving as the director of operations for her husband's sound design company Anonymouz in 2005 and would stay in this position until 2017 when the company would shift their branding and become 37hz Productions of which Sio-Faiumu is a co-founder and managing director to the present day. In late 2005 she left the Wahine Malosi Charitable Trust and began a position as the personal assistant to the national director of Te Wananga o Aotearoa - School of Performing Arts.

Following her time at Te Wananga o Aotearoa Sio-Faiumu would begin her decade long involvement with the Auckland Philharmonia Orchestra. While employed there from 2006 to 2016 she would hold various roles such as personal assistant to the CEO, office manager, board secretary and Pacific Island community liaison. She was a lead facilitator for their annual youth music programme, APO: Remix the Orchestra, which ran for the course of her term there. It was a highly successful programme for musically talented kids from South Auckland to engage with classical and contemporary music. It produced many successful figures in Pacific New Zealand music including, David Dallas, Dei Hamo, Frisko, Erhmen, Tyree and Anonymouz. At the end of the programme, the children and mentors hold a large showcase performance. In 2013 her show was one of three to receive a prestigious Musical Rights Award from the United Nations' International Music Council.

Whilst working with Auckland Philharmonia Orchestra Sio-Faiumu was also working at RAN Events as an Events Producer which she began in 2006 and left in 2017. She cites in 2012 a career highlight of hers was playing a role in the introduction of the Sistema Aotearoa Programme to her Otara Community. It is a programme to help uplift the Otara community by introducing the children on the area to classical music and then training them in classical instruments. This helped to create a young orchestra that was ready to compete on a national level. The Sistema Aotearoa headquarters are within the Otara Music and Arts Centre.

From 2016 to 2020 Sio-Faiumu became a contracted Project Coordinator for the annual Auckland Arts Festivals Whanui Programme. The programme was a collaborative effort between the Auckland Arts Festival and Auckland communities, featuring five projects celebrating creative intergenerational conversations. In 2018 as part of the Whanui Programme she produced the show 4 THA LUMANA'I which was a live performance exploring parallels between traditional Samoan customs and contemporary Hip Hop art forms. Sio-Faiumu cites another career highlight when she was a part of the team who founded the Manukau Secondary Schools Performing Arts Awards which is now Stand up Stand out / SUSO showcase (2016).

In 2019 Sio-Faiumu was hired as co-chair / Toihau Matarua of SOUNZ: Centre for New Zealand Music.

For the New Zealand Festival of the Arts in 2021 Sio-Faiumu produced the work Resample Tatau by Anonymouz with their company 37hz Productions.

== Awards ==
- 2013 - APO (Auckland Philharmonia Orchestra) Remix the Orchestra received an International Music Council (IMC) Musical Rights Award from the UN
- 2017 - Recipient of a Special Recognition Award at Creative New Zealand's Pasifika Arts Awards

== Career ==
Work Catalogue
Year	Company	Role
1997 - 2001	Otara Music and Arts Centre (OMAC)	Centre Coordinator
2002 - 2005	Wahine Malosi Charitable Trust	Creative Director
2005	Pacific Music Awards (PMAC)	Founding member of the Pacific Music Awards
2005 - 2006	Te Wananga o Aotearoa - School of Performing Arts	Personal Assistant to the National Director
2005 - 2017	Anonymouz	Served as the Director of Operations at Anonymouz from 2005 to 2017
2006 - 2016	Auckland Philharmonia Orchestra	Held various roles from 2006 to 2016, including Personal Assistant, Office Manager, and Pacific Island Community Liaison.
2006 - 2016	Auckland Philharmonia Orchestra - Remix the Orchestra	Lead facilitator of the Auckland Philharmonia Orchestra's award-winning programme, Remix the Orchestra
2008 - 2017	RAN Events	Events Producer
2012	Sistema Aotearoa Program	Played a role in supporting the introduction of the Sistema Aotearoa program into the Ōtara community, helping build a nationally ready-to-compete orchestra.
2016 - 2020	Auckland Arts Festival - Whanui Programme (Contracted)	Project Coordinator for the Whanui Programme
2016	Otara Music and Arts Centre	Being a part of the team who initiated the Manukau Secondary Schools Performing Arts Awards which is now Stand up Stand out (SUSO)
2017–present	37Hz Productions	Co-founded and currently serves as the managing director of 37 Hz Productions, a digital creative production company, since 2017
2018	4 THA LUMANA'I	Producer of 4 THA LUMANA'I
2019–present	SOUNZ Centre for New Zealand Music	Co-chair / Toihau Matarua of the Board of SOUNZ
2021	New Zealand Festival of the Arts - 37 Hz Productions: Resample Tatau	Produced Resample Tatau with her co-founded production company 37hz Productions.
