= Chong Nee =

New Zealand singer-songwriter and producer

Chong-Nee
- Birth name: Matakite John Chong-Nee
- Born: October 1975 (age 49)
- Origin: New Zealand
- Genres: hip hop, rhythm and blues, pop
- Occupation(s): Singer songwriter music producer
- Instrument: Singing
- Labels: Handmade Records
- Website: Chongnee.com

Matakite John Chong Nee, better known by his stage name Chong Nee, is a New Zealand hip hop and R&B singer-songwriter and producer.

Widely regarded as one of New Zealand's top musicians, he has produced songs for many New Zealand artists including Pieter T, Che Fu, Dei Hamo, PNC, Dave Dobbyn, AKA Brown and the Deceptikonz as well as for himself.

Chong-Nee has won awards such as the 2007 APRA professional development award and best male artist and best Hip Hop artist at the 2007 Pacific Music Awards. He has achieved six top-20 NZ airplay chart hits for his solo album Just Getting By On Love.

Chong-Nee won the 2007 APRA Professional Development Award.

Chong-Nee is in the making of his third album, entitled THE CARNIVAL, the first single, "THE FIGHT", is scheduled to release 23 February 2015.

He is of Chinese, Samoan, and Māori ancestry. He has five children.

== Discography ==
=== Albums ===
- Just Getting By on Love (2006)
- Chong Nee & Friends (2010)
- THE CARNIVAL (TBA)

=== Singles ===
Writer

- "We Gon' Ride", performed by Dei Hamo
- "Explode", performed by Dei Hamo

Performer

- "Thin Line"
- "Scenario"
- "Walk My Way"
- "More Than You Know"
- "You Got My Heart"
- "Black Widow"
- "Find Me", with PNC
