= Tomorrow People (band) =

New Zealand reggae band

- Origin: Wellington, New Zealand
- Genre: Reggae
- Years active: 2010–present
- Label: Quaver Entertainment (Independent) Previously Illegal Musik / Warner Music
- Members: Avina Kelekolio (percussion, vocals) Tana Tupai (lead keys, BVs); Fredwyn Kisona (lead vocals); Te Aranga Savage (lead vocals); Duane Te Whetu (drums); Hennie Tui (bass) Snow Chase (vocals, guitar)
- Past members: Liam Va'ai Lio Fili; Kenape Saupese; Hamo Dell; Daniel Sugrue; Elia Feterika; Analote Faletolu; La'i Lepou; Aaron Davey; Marcus Abraham; Luke Whaanga; Johanna Beazley; Sianne Dougherty; Aroha Owens; Greer Samuel; Kahui Toby Kevin Malagamali'i
- Website: http://www.tomorrowpeople.co.nz

Tomorrow People is a seven-piece New Zealand reggae band that formed in 2010. Their debut album One was released on 1 June 2012 under Illegal Musik / Warner Music and debuted at Number One on the New Zealand charts. It was later certified Gold. They have also released an EP called One.5 in 2014, and a full-length album called Bass & Bassinets in 2015. Their EP "BBQ" Reggae was released in January 2018 and debuted at number one in New Zealand.

== History ==
=== Early years ===
Tomorrow People began as a studio project in 2010 between four friends who were in a previous band together. Avina Kelekolio (production, toasting), Lio Fili (bass, production), Tana Tupai (keys) and Liam Va'ai (vocals) all played together in the covers band Terakey, and in their spare time they recorded some songs at Avina's home studio setup in Wellington. Once they had a handful of original songs, the group uploaded their music to YouTube. The social media public had a listen to "One More Time", "Jammin" and "Sundown Girl" and it was not long before they were asked if they could play some live shows.

As they did not have a live band at the time, Elia Feterika (drums), Analote Faletolu (vocals), Aaron Davey (guitar) and La'i Lepou (keys) were recruited to make up the original line up of Tomorrow People. Their first show was an opening slot for New Zealand roots reggae band Three Houses Down in Masterton.

=== 2012: ONE ===
The band's debut album was entirely written by the original four members. Avina Kelekolio did the overall production while the others contributed ideas in Avina's home studio. Mixing and mastering was all done in-house. The first single to be released was "Feel Alright" featuring Hawaiian band Kolohe Kai and although it was a collaboration, the song was done entirely via sending files and ideas back and forth between New Zealand and Hawaii. The song was one of the first reggae songs to be played on urban radio in New Zealand. A trend which continues to this day. 10 songs from this album were released to radio between 2010 and 2012.

Before the release of the album, original member Liam Va'ai had left the band to focus on other things. Despite being co-credited with majority of the album, he does not appear in any of the band's music videos.

The album ONE stayed in the New Zealand music charts for a span of 52 weeks. It was certified Gold, won a Waiata Music Award and a nomination for Pacific Album of the Year VPMA, and Best Roots Album and the NZVMA. End of year official charts placed the album at #9 across all genres.

=== 2013: ONE.5 ===
In 2013, Tomorrow People released an 8-track EP titled ONE.5. This was to be an extension of the original "ONE" album. With new members on board, they varied their style and incorporated elements of R&B and pop into some of their songs. Hennie Tui contributed his R&B style which can be heard on the songs "So Far" and "All I Wanna Do". The first song to be released was "So Far" and it gave a new direction to the band. The EP also gave spotlight to new vocalists Kenape Saupese (Kensau), Luke Whaanga and Johanna Tepania.

=== 2015: Bass & Bassinets ===
Bass & Bassinets represented a new start and refresh of the band. With only three members remaining from the ONE album, the band varied their approach to songwriting. With new members Hamo Dell, Daniel Sugrue and Marcus Abraham on board, there was a range of different styles being brought to the table. Avina Kelekolio took on the task of production while Tana Tupai was the executive producer with focus on the overall sound. As the band wanted to collaborate more with other musicians, they enlisted the skills of Sammy Johnson, Sons of Zion, Francis Kora, Paua, Lion Rezz, Papa Pablo and The Prxfile for songwriting and collaborations.

=== 2018: "BBQ" Reggae ===
In late 2017, Tomorrow People decided to release their 4th offering exclusively at New Zealand's biggest reggae festival 'One Love'. Consisting of 6 originals and 2 language songs, the EP climbed quickly to No.1 on the NZ Official Top 40 charts. From there, the EP gave the band a Waiata Music Award, five Vodafone Pacific Music Awards, a New Zealand Music 'Tui' and a nomination for Best Roots Artist at the 2018 VNZMA. The effort also earned co-managers Tana Tupai and Avina Kelekolio an MMF Music Managers award for Best Self-Managed Artist. Featuring on the EP is Jamaican artist Conkarah.

=== 2021: 21 ===
In December 2021, Tomorrow People released their third full-length album consisting of 16 tracks. They released these songs throughout the year as part of their "First Fridays" campaign. This 'waterfall release' method was the first of its kind, and it allowed the band to effectively release 12 singles along with 1 album.

== Discography ==
=== Albums ===
Title	Album details	Peak chart position
Title	Album details	NZ
ONE	Released: 1 June 2012; Label: Illegal / Warner; Format: CD, digital download; 13 tracks + 1 iTunes bonus track; Certified Gold	1
ONE.5	Released: 22 November 2013; Label: Illegal / Warner; Format: CD, digital download; 8 tracks	6
Bass & Bassinets	Released: 13 November 2015; Label: Illegal / Warner; Format: CD, digital download; 13 tracks + 1 iTunes bonus track	1
BBQ Reggae	Released: 29 January 2018; Format: CD, digital download; 8 tracks	1

=== Singles released ===
Year	Single	Vocalist(s)	Album
2010	"Jammin"	Liam Va'ai	ONE
2010	"Sundown Girl"	Liam Va'ai / Avina Kelekolio	ONE
2011	"One More Time"	Liam Va'ai / Avina Kelekolio	ONE
2011	"Feel Alright" (featuring Kolohe Kai)	Liam Va'ai / Roman De Peralta	ONE
2011	"Tonight"	Liam Va'ai / Avina Kelekolio	ONE
2011	"Have Yourself a Merry Little Christmas"	Liam Va'ai / Greer Samuel	Illegal Musik – For Christmas EP
2012	"Better Place"	Liam Va'ai / Avina Kelekolio	ONE
2012	"Souljah Feeling" (featuring Chad Chambers)	Luke Whaanga / Chad Chambers	ONE
2012	"Take It Away"	Kenape Saupese	ONE
2013	"Irie Music"	Luke Whaanga	ONE
2013	"Souljah Feeling" (House of Shem Remix)	Luke Whaanga / Chad Chambers / Te Omeka Perkins	Single only
2013	"You Give Me Something" (Duet Remix)	Johanna Tepania / Kenape Saupese / Avina Kelekolio	ONE.5 EP
2013	"So Far"	Kenape Saupese	ONE.5 EP
2014	"Fly Away" (featuring Tyna Keelan)	Kenape Saupese	ONE.5 EP
2014	"Given Up"	Johanna Tepania / Avina Kelekolio	ONE.5 EP
2014	"Daydreamer"	Luke Whaanga	ONE.5 EP
2014	"Again & Again"	Kenape Saupese / Avina Kelekolio	Bass & Bassinets
2015	"No Rush"	Kenape Saupese / Avina Kelekolio	Bass & Bassinets
2015	"No Rush" (Papa Pablo Remix)	Kenape Saupese / Avina Kelekolio	Bass & Bassinets
2015	"Get It Back"	Hamo Dell	Bass & Bassinets
2016	"Independent Girl"	Kenape Saupese / Avina Kelekolio	Bass & Bassinets
2016	"Train to Nowhere" (featuring Paua)	Marcus Abraham / Jay Whitmore	Bass & Bassinets
2016	"Writing's On The Wall" (featuring Fran Kora)	Marcus Abraham / Francis Kora	Bass & Bassinets
2016	"Chance Go By"	Hamo Dell	Bass & Bassinets
2017	"This Feeling" (featuring Sons of Zion)	Kenape Saupese / Sam Eriwata	Bass & Bassinets
2017	"Even Though"	Kenape Saupese	Bass & Bassinets
2017	"Lock Me Up"	Marcus Abraham / Kenape Saupese / Avina Kelekolio	BBQ Reggae
2017	"Don't Wanna Fight It"	Kenape Saupese / Marcus Abraham	BBQ Reggae
2018	"Don't Wanna Fight It" (Poly Reo Remix)	Kenape Saupese / Marcus Abraham / Hamo Dell	Single only
2018	"No Good"	Hamo Dell	BBQ Reggae
2018	"Kua To Te Ra" (No Good - Te Reo)	Hamo Dell	Single only
2019	"Where I Stand" (featuring Conkarah)	Kenape Saupese / Conkarah / Avina Kelekolio	BBQ Reggae
2019	"Fever" (featuring Fiji)	Hamo Dell / George 'Fiji' Veikoso	Single only
2020	"Fever" - The Island Remixes	Hamo Dell / George 'Fiji' Veikoso / Wayno / Molo Try / Eono / Jaro Local	Fever - The Island Remixes EP
2021	"Lose Track Of Time"	Te Aranga Savage	Single only - First Fridays
2021	"Rere Te Wa"	Te Aranga Savage	Single only
2021	"Just A Little Bit"	Snow Chase / Avina Kelekolio	Single only - First Fridays
2021	"My Guy" (featuring Wayno)	Te Aranga Savage / Wayne La'ai	Single only - First Fridays
2021	"Show Me"	Kenape Saupese	Single only - First Fridays
2021	"Don't Worry Baby"	Te Aranga Savage	Single only - First Fridays
2021	"Say My Name"	Fredwyn Kisona / Avina Kelekolio	Single only - First Fridays
2021	"Your Man"	Fredwyn Kisona	Single only - First Fridays
2021	"Vows"	Snow Chase	Single only - First Fridays
2021	"Rise Up"	Snow Chase / Fredwyn Kisona	Waiata Anthems Vol. 2
2021	"Give It To Me" (featuring Fiji)	Te Aranga Savage / George 'Fiji' Veikoso	Single only - First Fridays
2021	"Better Off Alone"	Snow Chase	21
2021	"Da da da da da"	Te Aranga Savage	21
2021	"See You One Day"	Fredwyn Kisona	21
2021	"Oku Ra"	Snow Chase	Single only
2022	"Give In To Me - Remix"(featuring Rex Atirai & Fiji)	Te Aranga Savage / Rex Atirai / George 'Fiji' Veikoso	Single only
2023	"Slow Up" (with Justin Wellington)	Justin Wellington	Single only
2023	"A Little Bit More"	Fredwyn Kisona	Single only
2023	"Best Of My Love"	Fredwyn Kisona	Single only
2023	"It's You" (with STNDRD & Canaan Ene)	STNDRD / Fredwyn Kisona	Single only
2023	"Ki Raro" (with Rex Atirai)	Rex Atirai / Avina Kelekolio	Single only

=== Featured appearances ===
Release	Album	Artist	Track
2013	Universal Love	Sons of Zion	Superman
2013	Aotearoa Reggae All Stars (single only)	Various Artists	Sensitive to a Smile
2013	Be with You – Remix (single only)	Deach	Be with You
2014	Raggamuffin VIII	Various Artists	Souljah Feeling
2015	One Love: The Very Best of Aotearoa Reggae	Various Artists	Take It Away
2016	One Love 2016	Various Artists	Again & Again
2018	Love Her Mind (Single)	Israel Starr	Love Her Mind

== Awards ==
Year	Award	Nominated work	Category	Result
2012	Waiata Maori Music Awards	"ONE"	Best Roots Reggae Album	Won
2012	New Zealand Music Awards	"ONE"	Best Roots Album	Nominated
2013	Vodafone Pacific Music Awards	"ONE"	Best Pacific Group	Won
2013	Vodafone Pacific Music Awards	"ONE"	Best Pacific Album	Nominated
2013	Waiata Maori Music Awards	"Souljah Feeling (Remix)	Best Music Video	Nominated
2014	Waiata Maori Music Awards	"ONE.5"	Best Urban Roots Album	Nominated
2014	Waiata Maori Music Awards	"Daydreamer"	Best Music Video	Nominated
2014	Vodafone Pacific Music Awards	"ONE.5"	Best Pacific Group	Nominated
2015	Vodafone Pacific Music Awards	"Again & Again"	Best Pacific Group	Nominated
2016	Vodafone Pacific Music Awards	"Bass & Bassinets"	Best Pacific Group	Nominated
2016	Vodafone Pacific Music Awards	"Bass & Bassinets"	Best Producer	Nominated
2017	Vodafone Pacific Music Awards	"Writings on the Wall"	Best Pacific Group	Nominated
2017	New Zealand Music Awards	"Lock Me Up"	Best Roots Artist	Nominated
2018	Vodafone Pacific Music Awards	"Lock Me Up"	Best Pacific Group	Won
2018	Vodafone Pacific Music Awards	"Sa'ili Le Alofa"	Best Language Song	Won
2018	Waiata Maori Music Awards	"BBQ Reggae"	Best Roots Reggae	Won
2018	New Zealand Music Awards	"BBQ Reggae"	Best Roots Artist	Nominated
2019	Pacific Music Awards	"BBQ Reggae"	Best Roots Reggae Artist	Won
2019	Pacific Music Awards	"BBQ Reggae"	Best Pacific Group	Won
2019	Pacific Music Awards	"BBQ Reggae"	People's Choice	Won
2019	New Zealand Music Awards	"BBQ Reggae"	Best Pacific Album	Won
2020	Pacific Music Awards	"Fever"	Best Pacific Group	Won
2021	Aotearoa Music Awards	First Fridays	Best Roots Reggae Artist	Nominated
2022	Pacific Music Awards	"21"	Best Pacific Album	Won
2022	Pacific Music Awards	"21"	Best Pacific Group	Nominated
2022	Pacific Music Awards	"21"	Best Roots Reggae Artist	Won
2022	Pacific Music Awards	"21"	Best Producer	Nominated
2022	Waiata Maori Music Awards	"21"	Best Music Video	Nominated
2022	Waiata Maori Music Awards	"21"	Best Group	Nominated
2022	Waiata Maori Music Awards	"21"	Best Roots Reggae Album	Nominated
