= Spacifix =

New Zealand band

- Origin: West Auckland, New Zealand
- Genres: Funk, soul, blues, R&B, reggae, ska
- Years active: 2003–present
- Labels: Ocean Entertainment

Spacifix is a New Zealand funk/soul/R&B and reggae boy group from West Auckland, New Zealand. They formed in April 2003 with the view of entering the Smokefree Pacifica Beats national competition. Aged between 13 and 18 years they won the competition first time up. Until April 2005, the band played a number of festivals and concerts and increased their fan base in West Auckland.

In March 2006 Spacifix signed a management agreement with Ocean Entertainment Ltd, a management team dedicated to taking New Zealand music on to the world stage. World Fresh (Director Ondrej Havas) commissioned Spacifix to write and record the 2006 40-hour Famine soundtrack – Spread da Word. A television series commissioned with TVNZ was produced – Henderson To Hollywood – following the band's preparation for a major opportunity in Los Angeles, U.S.

Spacifix have recorded Sunshine Day and it has been released to radio and television.

Sunshine Day was selected by NZ On Air to be distributed to all radio programmers on their February Hit Disc release.

On 8 March 2006 Spacifix supported UB40 in their Tongan concert and performed to a crowd of over 10,000 people. Telecom chose Spacifix to launch the Telecom Music Store to promote the new cellphone download phenomenon. Spacifix appeared as virtual holograms in Telecom's downtown store in Queen Street throughout May, June and July in the hours of darkness.

They have released two more singles; "Gotta get Like This", and more recently, "Make things Right" released on Tuesday 20 February 2007.

In August 2007 Spacifix released 'Old Skool Remix (feat. AMG). The song received heavy radio support.

July 2008: Spacifix returned from touring Europe, UK and Australia. They performed to a huge audience of around 34,000 at the Christian music festival EO Youth Day in the Netherlands and the show was broadcast to over 1 million viewers throughout Holland. Upon their visit, the band's self-titled EP has become available in stores throughout Holland.

2009 has seen the band move to Brisbane, Australia.

== Television appearances ==
During the first half of 2006 Spacifix performed on the following television shows:

- December 2005: Tagata Pacifica – TV2
- January 2006: Disney TV – TV2
- February 2006: Mai Time – TV2
- March 2006: Coast TV – Maori TV and TV3
- April 2006: Pacific Beat Street – TV3
- May 2006: Studio 2 – TV2
- April 2007: Good Morning – TV1
- April 2007: Parachute 2007 Highlights – C4
- June 2007: Good Morning – TV1
- June 2007: Studio 2 Saturdays – TV2

Plus many more...

== Performances ==
Spacifix live performances are electric, known for their quirky flair, upbeat funky sound and groovy dance moves. Their gigs include:

- March 2006: Pasifika 2006 – Air New Zealand stage and APRA stage.
- April 2006: Titirangi Music Festival
- May 2006: Spacifix performed as live in-flight entertainment on a chartered Air New Zealand flight to celebrate the beginning of NZ Music Month. This had never been done before in New Zealand.
- May 2006: Thrive conference – Performed at closing.
- May 2006: Pacific Music Awards
- August/Oct 2006: Smokefree Pacifica Beats competition – Guest performance at regional competitions and finals.
- April 2007: Official Opening, Vector Arena, Auckland. Appearing on the same bill as Daniel Bedingfield, Goldenhorse, Che Fu, Don McGlashan and Hollie Smith, Sir Howard Morrison (performed "I Believe I Can Fly" with him)
- July/August 2007: Christina Aguilera's Back to Basics Tour, they were to be the support act for the two dates in Auckland, but the shows were cancelled due to the singer's illness.
- December 2007: Spacifix performed at the 20th annual Woodford Folk Festival in Queensland, Australia.
- June 2008: EO Youth Day – expected audience of 35,000 people in the Gelredome Soccer Stadium, The Netherlands. They performed together with Delirious? and Starfield.
- October 2011: Polyfest, Australia – Performed alongside Katchafire, Nesian Mystik, 1814, Che Fu, J. Boog, Maisey Rika, Three Doors Down, Hot Rain, Sons of Zion and Mark Lowndes for Australia's biggest Polynesian Music Festival.

== Discography ==
=== Albums ===
Year	Title	Details	Peak chart positions
Year	Title	Details	NZ
2006	Much Love	Released: 1 October 2006; Label: Worldfresh Records	—
"—" denotes a recording that did not chart or was not released in that territory.

=== Singles ===
Year	Title	Peak chart positions	Album
Year	Title	NZ	Album
2006	"Sunshine Day"	11	Much Love
2006	"Gotta Get Like This"	—	Much Love
2006	"Make Things Right"	—	Much Love
2007	"Old Skool"	—	Much Love
2011	"Oh No!"	—	Non-album single
"—" denotes a recording that did not chart or was not released in that territory.
