= First Edition (Dei Hamo album) =

Studio album by Dei Hamo
- Released: 2005
- Genre: Hip hop
- Label: Universal Music; Hiruys Records
- Producer: Matt "Matty J" Ruys

First Edition is the first album by the New Zealand hip-hop artist, Dei Hamo released in 2005. The album charted at #13 on the New Zealand Albums Chart.

== Track listing ==
1. "Intro"
2. "To Tha Floor"
3. "Make It Hot"
4. "Explode", featuring Crystal
5. "This Is My Life", featuring Chong Nee
6. "Do Work"
7. "Whateva"
8. "Hot Girl 05"
9. "We Gon' Ride"
10. "The Kissing Game", featuring Crystal
11. "Home Invasion", featuring Boh Runga
12. "In the Name"
13. "Pillow Talk"
14. "Cry Again", featuring Tim Finn
15. "A True Story"
16. "Outro"
17. "Hot Girl" (Bonus Track)
