= Maryanne Ito =

American musician

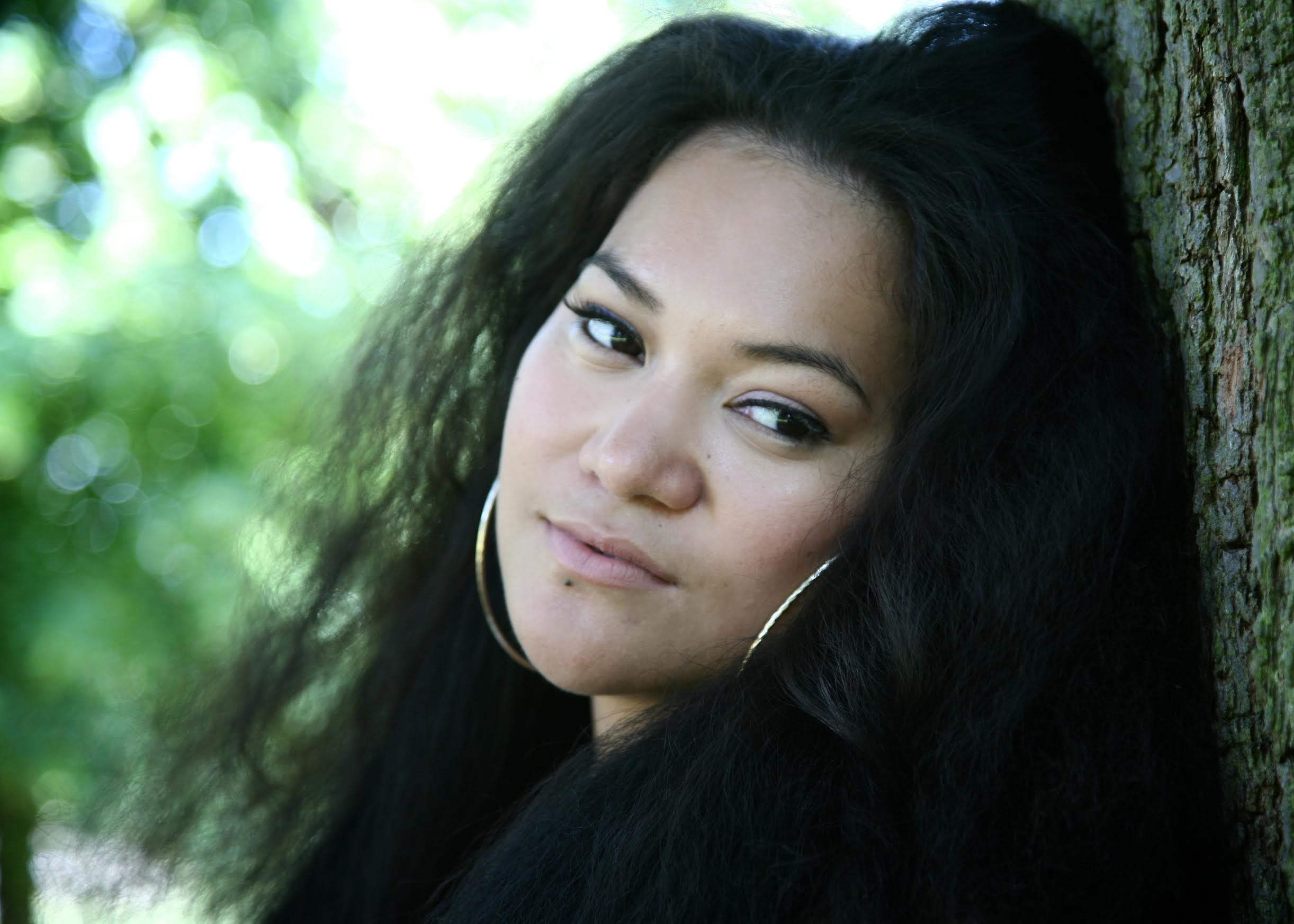

Background information
- Born: Maryanne Ito; 1983 (age 41–42); Fort Riley, Kansas, U.S.
- Origin: Honolulu, Hawaii, U.S.
- Genres: Soul, neo soul, jazz, R&B, hip hop
- Occupation(s): Vocalist, songwriter, performer
- Instrument: Vocals
- Years active: 2006–present
- Website: www.maryanneito.com/Maryanneito/Welcome.html

Maryanne Ito is an American soul singer, songwriter, and performer based in Honolulu, Hawaii. Blending genres such as neo soul, soul, hip hop, jazz, and R&B, she has been writing and performing since 2006 and collaborating with musicians such as Slapp Symphony and DJ Bennie James. In 2014 she released her debut album Waking Up, which peaked at No. 4 on the UK Soul Chart. The album incorporates diverse styles, with Star Advertiser calling her voice "distinctive, sweet and sexy."

She has toured Hawaii with The Astatine Collective as support, and in the summer of 2015 she toured Europe, performing at venues such as Radio6 in Amsterdam, Band on the Wall in Manchester, the Jazz Cafe in London, and Hare & Hounds in Birmingham. In May 2015, Waking Up was named the Best R&B Album of the Year at the Na Hoku Hanohano Awards, and the following month Ito was named Best Pacific/ International Artist at the Pacific Music Awards.

== Biography ==
=== Early life and career ===
Maryanne Ito was born in 1983 in Fort Riley, Kansas. Of Japanese and Samoan descent, she was raised in California, American Samoa, and Honolulu, Hawaii. In 2006 Ito served as a backup singer on a track for her elder brother Bless'd Chil', which attracted the attention of James Westbrook and led to Ito collaborating with the production duo called Slapp Symphony. They released the track "With You," with later became the lead single on Slapp Symphony's album Lands of the Lost, which won a Hawaii Music Award. In 2009 she performed at the Hawaii Music Awards, and also had a television appearance on Living Local With The Baraquios.

She continued writing songs that blended styles such as neo soul, jazz, R&B, hip hop, and neo-reggae, also performing about Hawaii. In 2011 she wrote "Waking Up," again produced by Slapp Symphony, and also released the non-album single "Compare 2 U," a collaboration with Dyvon and Fool's Scholarship. Among other performances, in 2011 she opened for Blackstar at the Hawaii Theatre. She opened for hip hop artist Jean Grae in 2012, and also performed at Queen Supreme, Poly Girls Rock, and The Hawaii Food Bank's Annual Hunger Walk.

Ito performed at events such as Nesian Fest, Nesian Winter Groove, and the High Chief XL Memorial Salute in 2013, and by that time she was touring with a backup band. The group, dubbed The Astatine Collective, consists of Freeze as DJ, Sub Z on MPC and audio engineering, Deesarono as a contributing vocalist, songwriter, and multi-instrumentalist (drums, keyboards, and guitar), JT on bass, and King David on drums. The group continued to tour with Ito into 2014, and as of May 16, 2014, she had toured the Pacific Northwest of the United States.

=== 2014: Waking Up ===
Throughout the beginning of 2014 Ito continued to write for other artists, while also working on her debut album. Engineered at Primaphonix Studio by DJ Sub-Zero, a number of producers and sound engineers were brought in to help on her debut, with several guest artists such as guitarist David Yamasaki contributing as well. Titled Waking Up, an official release party for the album was held in April 2014, hosted by her long-term collaborator DJ Bennie James. The official release took place in June, and the album peaked at No. 4 on the UK Soul Chart six weeks after being released. On October 13, 2014, the album was still holding its position on the UK Soul Chart at No. 30. John Berger of the Star Advertiser gave the album a positive review, explaining that some of the tracks have "slow rhythms, introspective lyrics and heavy, solid bass lines." Berger also praised the timbre of her voice, calling it "distinctive, sweet and sexy."

She toured Hawaii in support of the album, and in October 2014 she and local group The Astatine Collective performed at Hallowbaloo. She was also a performer at the Great Chefs Fight Hunger Gala put on as a charity event by the Hawaii Food Bank on March 21, 2015. On May 23, 2015, Waking Up was named the Best R&B Album of the Year at the Na Hoku Hanohano Awards. On June 6, 2015, she performed live with a backing band for Hawaii Public Radio and a private audience at Atherton Studio. Afterwards she took part in the Musicconnex tour of Europe, with the Dutch acid-jazz band Tristan, performing throughout June at venues such as Bizz'Art in Paris, Radio6 and Sugar Factory in Amsterdam, Band on the Wall in Manchester, the Jazz Cafe in London, and Hare & Hounds in Birmingham. On June 13, 2015, Ito was named Best Pacific/International Artist at the Pacific Music Awards.

== Personal life ==
As of 2014 Ito is based in her hometown of Honolulu.

== Awards and nominations ==
Year	Award	Nominated work	Category	Result
2015	Na Hoku Hanohano Awards	Waking Up	Best R&B Album of the Year	Won
2015	Pacific Music Awards	Maryanne Ito	Best Pacific/International Artist	Won

== Discography ==
=== Albums ===
Albums by Maryanne Ito
Year	Album title	Release details	Charts
Year	Album title	Release details	UK Soul
2014	Waking Up	Released: June 5, 2014; Label: Self-released; Format: CD, digital	4

=== Collaborative mixtapes ===
Collaborative mixtapes with Maryanne Ito
Year	Album	Notes
2013	Stone Groove Family DJs Presents: So Silky Smooth, I Love Dilla ft Ms. Maryanne Ito	With Dilla

=== Singles ===
Incomplete list of songs by Maryanne Ito
Year	Title	Album	Release details
2006	"I Found U" (with Bless Chil')	Non-album single	
2008	"With U"	Landz Of The Lost	Prod. by Slapp Symphony
2011	"Compare 2 U" (with Dyvon, Fool's Scholarship)	Non-album single	
2011	"Waking Up"	Drown Em In Beats, Save Em With Rhymes	Prod. by Slapp Symphony
2012	"Peaceful" (with Chastise)	Non-album single	Produced by DJ Bennie James
2012	"Sure Shot Love" (ft. Jemere Morgan)	Non-album single	Self-released (December 31, 2012)
2013	"Lit" (with Kwalified and Listen & Share)	Non-album single	
2014	"How I Feel (DJ Bennie James Radio Edit)"	Waking Up	June 5, 2014
2014	"How I Feel"	7 track single	September 16, 2014

== See also ==
- List of singer-songwriters
