= Jordan Gavet =

- Born: Jordan Gavet; 1988 or 1989
- Genres: Pop; R&B; soul
- Occupation: Singer
- Instrument: Vocals
- Years active: 2019–present
- Label: Sony Music New Zealand

Jordan Gavet is a New Zealand R&B singer of Samoan descent. Gavet debuted as a musician in 2019 through Sony Music New Zealand after over a decade of releasing demos to SoundCloud and YouTube. In 2023, her song "He Said", originally a demo from 2008, became a hit in New Zealand.

== Biography ==
Gavet was born in Sydney, Australia, and spent her early life in Avondale in West Auckland, New Zealand. Gavet identifies most strongly as Samoan; her father is Samoan, and her mother has Samoan, English, Portuguese and Tokelauan heritage. Her parents were both born and raised in New Zealand, and her dad worked as a musician. Gavet moved back to Sydney for high school.

She began songwriting at 17, and in 2008 her father encouraged her to post a demo of her song "He Said" online. Gavet gained notoriety on SoundCloud and YouTube in the late 2000s and 2010s. In 2014, Gavet was featured on the album Blank Canvas: Wall & Piece by The Doqument, and on "One Night" by Fiji in 2015.

Gavet's SoundCloud was discovered by New Zealand hip-hop DJ P-Money in 2017, which led to her signing a record deal. In 2019, Gavet opened for Stan Walker during his New Zealand tour, and debuted as a soloist in 2019, with the single "Hesitation". At the 2020 Pacific Music Awards, Gavet won the award for Best Pacific Soul/R&B Artist due to "Hesitation".

In 2021, Gavet released her debut extended play Smoke, on which she collaborated with Australian R&B producer Willstah. At the 2021 Pacific Music Awards, Gavet won the Best Pacific Female Artist award, due to one of the singles released from Smoke, "Do Better". In late 2022, Gavet released a studio version of "He Said", which originated as a demo on her SoundCloud in 2008. The song was a hit in New Zealand in 2023, reaching number nine on the New Zealand artists' singles chart.

== Inspirations ==
Gavet's musical influences include Prince, D'Angelo, Tina Turner and Pharrell Williams.

== Discography ==
=== Extended plays ===
Title	Album details
Smoke	Released: 19 February 2021; Label: Sony Music New Zealand; Format: Digital download, streaming

=== Singles ===
==== As lead artist ====
Title	Year	Peak chart positions		Album
Title	Year	NZ Hot	NZ Artist	Album
"Hesitation"	2019	—	—	Smoke
"Away"	2019	—	—	Smoke
"Do Better"	2020	—	—	Smoke
"Smoke" (featuring CG Fez)	2021	28	—	Smoke
"He Said"	2022	15	8	Non-album singles
"My Girl" (with JKing)	2024	32	14	Non-album singles
"—" denotes a recording that did not chart.

==== As featured artist ====
Title	Year	Album
"Crazy" (DJ Peter Gunz featuring Jordan Gavet)	2011	Non-album singles
"One Night" (Fiji featuring Jordan Gavet)	2015	Non-album singles

=== Guest appearances ===
Title	Year	Other artists	Album
"We On"	2014	The Doqument	Blank Canvas: Wall & Piece
"I Am the Colour"	2022	Stan Walker, Scribe	All In
