= Paradise, Hawaiian Style (song) =

Song by Elvis Presley

from the album Paradise, Hawaiian Style
- Released: 1966
- Recorded: July 27, 1965
- Length: 2:39
- Songwriter(s): Bill Giant; Bernie Baum; Florence Kaye

"Paradise, Hawaiian Style" is a song first recorded by Elvis Presley as part of the soundtrack for his 1966 motion picture Paradise, Hawaiian Style.

Its first release on record was in 1966 on the soundtrack album Paradise, Hawaiian Style.

Another significant use of the song, apart from the initial movie, was it opening the world's first concert broadcast via satellite in 1973 called Aloha from Hawaii. The studio recording was used in the opening images, the song was not performed live in the actual concert.

== Writing and recording ==
The song was written by Bill Giant, Bernie Baum, and Florence Kaye.

Presley recorded it on July 27 at the soundtrack recordings for the Paramount movie Paradise, Hawaiian Style (that took place on July 26–27 and August 2–4, 1965 at the Radio Recorders studio in Hollywood, California. The vocal master is a splice of takes 4 and 3.

== Track listings ==
7-inch EP Paradise, Hawaiian Style by Elvis Presley with The Jordanaires (RCA Victor, New Zealand)

A1. "Paradise - Hawaiian Style" (Giant, Baum, Kaye)
A2. "This Is My Heaven" (Giant, Baum, Kaye)
B1. "Drums of the Islands" (Polynesian Culture Centre, Tepper, Bennett)
B2. "Stop Where You Are" (Giant, Baum, Kaye)
