= Lolenese Usoaliʻi-Hickey =

Samoan New Zealand singer

- Occupation: Singer
- Awards: 1997: New Zealand Music Award for most promising female vocalist; * 2008: Best female artist at the Pacific Island Music Awards * 2012: Best Polynesian female artist worldwide at the International Polynesian Music Awards

Lolenese Usoaliʻi-Hickey is a Samoan New Zealand singer.

== Biography ==
Usoaliʻi-Hickey was raised in Porirua, New Zealand and moved to Auckland in 1994.

In 1995, she released five singles with Papa Pacific and Warner Music. In 2004, she moved to Samoa and established her own record label, focusing on traditional Samoan music. The same year, she was a founding member of the Pacific Island Music Awards in New Zealand. She also founded the Samoan Music Awards in 2010.

Her song Tu I Luga was used as boxer David Tua's entrance music in his fight against Shane Cameron in 2009.

=== Awards ===
In 1997 she won the New Zealand Music Award for most promising female vocalist. In 2008 she won best female artist at the Pacific Island Music Awards and in 20ame=":0" /> 12 she won best Polynesian female artist worldwide at the first International Polynesian Music Awards.<ref n
