= Pieter T =

PT
- Born: Pieter Tuhoro; 24 August 1987 (age 39); Hamilton, New Zealand
- Origin: Auckland, New Zealand
- Genre: R&B
- Years active: 2009–present
- Label: Handmade Records
- Website: www.pietert.com

Pieter Tuhoro (born 1987), known by his stage name Pieter T, is a New Zealand R&B singer and music producer. He was originally a member in the short lived music group, Boyband in 2006. Pieter T made his solo musical debut in 2009 with the single Cold Nights followed by the singles, Stay With Me, Can't Stop Loving You and Something Else which peaked at number six on the NZ Radio Charts. His latest release is the single the Business feat. PNC and Dei Hamo off his debut album Life, Love and Lessons.

== Career ==
In 2006, Pieter won a radio station competition on The Edge to become a member in a manufactured New Zealand boy band. As part of the group he was given the nickname, (Hot Boy). Since the band disbanded early 2007, he has been the only member to continue pursuing a music career.

In late 2008, Pieter met NZ urban artist Chong Nee who co-signed him to Kog Mastering / trading as Handmade Records. Kog Studio quickly starting working alongside him as he brought in producers such as Rahxx, Paurini Wiringi and David Nesian to create tracks for his debut album.

== Album ==
Pieter moved to Auckland from Hamilton in 2009. He is signed to Handmade Records. "Life, Love and Lessons" is his first studio album.

He commented on the writing process for the album:

I wrote the album this way, because it's something that almost every person will face at one time or another in their life. How their story plays out is entirely up to them. I don't wish to condone people’s actions with relationship, but rather highlight topics that I think people will relate too. Hopefully at least one of the songs of the album will mean something to them at one point or another:—Pieter T

'Life, Love and Lessons' includes collaborations with artists and producers including, Chong Nee, Aaradhna, PNC, Dei Hamo, Truth, Vince Harder and Rachel Fraser. Pieter writes his own songs, he has also musically produced each track on the album.

Pieter's first self released single 'Cold Nights' is still heavily requested on NZ radio. The summer release 'Business' leapt up the charts without a music video. 'Can't Stop Loving You', peaked at number 9 on the radio charts. The single 'Something Else' hit the charts peaking at #6. His latest single is "Let You Go".

The entire album was recorded Mixed and mastered at Kog Studio, in Auckland. It was released on 20 June 2010. Due to demand he will be touring with Dei Hamo and Smashproof nationwide in August 2011.

== Discography ==
Pieter T discography
- Studio albums: 2
- Singles: 10
- Music videos: 2

=== Singles ===
Year	Title	NZ peak chart position	Album
2009	"Cold Nights"	—	Non-album single
2009	"Something Else"	37	Non-album single
2009	"Stay With Me"	—	Non-album single
2010	"Can't Stop Loving You"	—	Life, Love and Lessons
2010	"Business" (featuring Dei Hamo and PNC)	—	Life, Love and Lessons
2011	"Let You Go"	—	Life, Love and Lessons
2011	"Quite Like You" (featuring Aaradhna)	—	Life, Love and Lessons
2011	"My Baby"	30	Completion
2012	"Make Believe" (featuring Sid Diamond)	—	Completion
2012	"It Would Be You"	—	Completion
2013	"Right Here (Your Love)"	—	Completion

=== Albums ===
- 2010 – Life, Love and Lessons
- 2013 – Completion (#34 NZ)
- 2018 – Goliath
