= Paradise, Hawaiian Style (soundtrack) =

Soundtrack album by Elvis Presley
- Released: June 1, 1966
- Recorded: July–August 1965
- Studio: Radio Recorders (Hollywood)
- Genres: Pop, Hawaiian
- Length: 22:20
- Label: RCA Victor
- Producers: David Weichman, Thorne Nogar

Elvis Presley chronology
Frankie and Johnny (1966)	Paradise, Hawaiian Style (1966)	Spinout (1966)

Professional ratings
Review scores
Source	Rating
AllMusic	1/5 stars

Paradise, Hawaiian Style is the thirteenth soundtrack album by American singer and musician Elvis Presley, released by RCA Victor in mono and stereo, LPM/LSP 3643, on June 1, 1966. It is the soundtrack to the 1966 film of the same name starring Presley. Recording sessions took place at Radio Recorders in Hollywood, California, on July 26 and 27, and August 2, 1965. It peaked at number 15 on the Top LP's chart.

== Background ==
Presley found himself in 1965 recording soundtrack albums for films that were almost a year away from release – gone were the days when the turnaround time from the final session for Elvis Is Back! to its arrival in the shops was less than one week. While working on this album, his most recent film in the theaters was Tickle Me, and Presley had completed three more movies since then. With titles like "A Dog's Life" and "Queenie Wahine's Papaya" he openly ridiculed the material, wasting time before finally approaching the microphone to do the job. He begrudgingly accepted songs given him that he would have rejected outright years earlier. He always finished the work, but in essence Presley had become a hired hand in his own career. Popular music, and particularly Rock n' Roll, was in a state of total change as an art form and Presley was 'lost in Hollywood'.

== Content ==
No singles were issued from songs on Paradise, Hawaiian Style. Ten songs were recorded at the sessions for the soundtrack, but only nine were used in the film. The omitted song, "Sand Castles", was included on the album to bring the running order to ten tracks. Sales for the album were under 250,000, a new low for Presley's LP catalogue. The good news was the single issued in June 1966 two days before the album, the 1945 Victor Young standard "Love Letters" backed with Clyde McPhatter's 1958 rhythm and blues hit "Come What May". It made a respectable number 19 on the Billboard Hot 100, and at least reflected Presley's actual tastes away from obligations to the soundtrack recordings. It was also his first contemporary record release in three years since "(You're the) Devil in Disguise" in June 1963, arriving in stores less than two weeks after it was recorded. Fijian musician Isireli Racule would write and compose the initial version of Drums of the Islands under the alias "Bula Laie", with his version of the song, which both was made in the Hawaiian language and used the melody of Fiji welcome song "Bula Maleya", then eventually translated into English. Additional versions of Racule's rendition of the song were also recorded in the Fijian language and several other Polynesian languages.

== Reissues ==
In 2004 Paradise, Hawaiian Style was reissued on the Follow That Dream label in a special edition that contained the original album tracks along with numerous alternate takes.

== Track listing ==
=== Original release ===
Side one
No.	Title	Writer(s)	Recording date	Length
1.	"Paradise, Hawaiian Style"	Bill Giant, Bernie Baum, Florence Kaye	July 27, 1965	2:39
2.	"Queenie Wahine's Papaya"	Bill Giant, Bernie Baum, Florence Kaye	July 27, 1965	1:35
3.	"Scratch My Back (Then I'll Scratch Yours)"	Bill Giant, Bernie Baum, Florence Kaye	July 26, 1965	2:16
4.	"Drums of the Islands"	Isireli Racule (original writer and composer, used name "Bula Laie"), Sid Tepper and Roy C. Bennett (English dub only)	July 26, 1965	2:34
5.	"Datin'"	Fred Wise and Randy Starr	July 26, 1965	1:23

Side two
No.	Title	Writer(s)	Recording date	Length
1.	"A Dog's Life"	Ben Weisman and Sid Wayne	July 27, 1965	1:59
2.	"House of Sand"	Bill Giant, Bernie Baum, Florence Kaye	July 27, 1965	2:04
3.	"Stop Where You Are"	Bill Giant, Bernie Baum, Florence Kaye	July 27, 1965	2:06
4.	"This Is My Heaven"	Bill Giant, Bernie Baum, Florence Kaye	July 27, 1965	2:36
5.	"Sand Castles" (bonus track)	David Hess and Herb Goldberg	August 2, 1965	2:58

=== 2004 Follow That Dream CD reissue ===
Original tracks
No.	Title	Length
1.	"Paradise, Hawaiian Style"	2:39
2.	"Queenie Wahine's Papaya"	1:34
3.	"Scratch My Back"	2:15
4.	"Drums of the Islands"	2:33
5.	"Datin'"	1:22
6.	"A Dog's Life"	1:58
7.	"House of Sand"	2:03
8.	"Stop Where You Are"	2:04
9.	"This Is My Heaven"	2:34
10.	"Sand Castles" (bonus track)	2:58

Previously released outtakes
No.	Title	Length
11.	"This Is My Heaven" (take 4)	3:01
12.	"A Dog's Life" (takes 4, 5, 6)	5:45
13.	"Datin'" (takes 6, 7, 8, 11, 12)	3:23
14.	"This Is My Heaven" (take 7)	2:48

Previously unreleased outtakes
No.	Title	Length
15.	"Drums of the Islands" (takes 4, 5)	3:37
16.	"Queenie Wahine's Papaya" (take 5)	1:57
17.	"Stop Where You Are" (take 1)	2:40
18.	"House Of Sand" (take 3 plus intro)	4:44
19.	"Paradise, Hawaiian Style" (takes 4, 1)	4:04
20.	"Scratch My Back" (take 1)	2:29
21.	"A Dog's Life" (take 8)	2:06
22.	"Sand Castles" (KOV take 1)	3:06
23.	"Datin'" (takes 1, 2, 3, 4)	3:20
24.	"This Is My Heaven" (takes 1, 2, 3)	3:56

== Personnel ==
- Elvis Presley – vocals
- The Jordanaires – backing vocals
- The Mello Men – backing vocals (on "Drums Of The Islands")
- Bernal Lewis – steel guitar
- Scotty Moore – electric guitar
- Barney Kessel – electric guitar
- Charlie McCoy – acoustic guitar
- Howard Roberts – electric guitar ("Sand Castles")
- Allan Hendrickson – electric guitar ("Sand Castles")
- Larry Muhoberac – piano
- Ray Siegel – double bass
- Keith Mitchell – bass guitar ("Sand Castles")
- D.J. Fontana – drums
- Hal Blaine – drums
- Milt Holland – drums
- Victor Feldman – drums ("Sand Castles")

== Charts ==
Album

Year	Chart	Position
1966	Billboard Pop Albums	15
