= All In (Stan Walker album) =

Studio album by Stan Walker
- Released: 19 August 2022
- Studio: Roundhead Studio
- Length: 69:29
- Label: Sony
- Producer: Devin Abrams; Matt Sadgrove; Stan Walker; HAMLEY; Hugh Lake; Simon Gooding; Aaron Ferrucci; Canaan Ene

Stan Walker chronology
Te Arohanui (2021)	All In (2022)

Singles from All In
- 1. "Don't Worry Baby" Released: 6 August 2022; 2. "Come Back Home" Released: 22 October 2021; 3. "Human" Released: 17 December 2021; 4. "Feelings" Released: 3 June 2022; 5. "Cold Nights" Released: 15 July 2022; 6. "The One You Want (60s Song)" Released: 19 August 2022

All In is the seventh studio album by New Zealand singer Stan Walker, released on 19 August 2022 by Sony Music New Zealand. It was announced on 22 June 2022.

A Deluxe edition was released on 1 September 2023, featuring a second disc.

== Track listing ==
Disc 1
No.	Title	Writer(s)	Length
1.	"All In"		3:33
2.	"Bullet"	Soraya LaPread; Walker	2:39
3.	"Best Friend"	Walker; Villette Dasha	3:42
4.	"You Like It"	Walker; Dasha	2:53
5.	"Mockingbird" (with Kings)	Kingdon Chapple-Wilson; Walker	3:22
6.	"Remember Us" (featuring JoJo)	Devin Abrams; Joanna Levesque; Nat Dunn; Walker	3:44
7.	"The One You Want (60s Song)" (featuring JessB)		2:54
8.	"Feelings" (featuring Kings)		3:23
9.	"I Am the Colour" (featuring Jordan Gavet and Scribe)		4:16
10.	"If You Love Me" (featuring Fatai)	Bradley J. Green; James Hamley; Hugh Lake; Walker; Thandolwethu Sikwila	3:53
11.	"Never Be Alone"	Hamley; Jess Bear; Walker	3:11
12.	"Cold Nights" (Pacific Heights featuring Stan Walker and Larissa Lambert)	Devin Abrams; Dani Brillhart; Colton Jones; Neil MacLeod; Matthew Young	3:06
13.	"Human" (featuring Vince Harder and Louis Baker)	Harder; Walker	3:16
14.	"Come Back Home"	Abrams; Matthew Sadgrove; Matiu Walters; Walker	3:20
15.	"Don't Worry Baby" (with Celina Sharma)	Aaron Ferrucci; Conor Maynard; Kali McLoughlin; Celina Sharma; Walker	3:08
16.	"Matemateāone"	Abrams; Isiah Ngawaka; Mikey Dam; Ruth Smith; Stan Walker	2:49
Total length:			53:09

Disc 2
No.	Title	Writer(s)	Length
1.	"Choose" (with Hamo Dell)	Matt Sadgrove; Walker	3:49
2.	"Bigger"	Michael Jade; Ryan Lewis; Ashton Parson; Walker	2:56
3.	"Tua" (featuring Ibanez Maeva)		3:07
4.	"Give"	Matiu Walters; Walker	3:18
5.	"Come Back Home" (featuring Canaan Ene (Canaan Ene remix))		3:10
Total length:			16:20

Deluxe edition Disc 2
No.	Title	Length
1.	"The One You Want / Baby It's You" (featuring JessB) (Live at Big Fan)	4:08
2.	"I Am the Colour" (featuring Jordan Gavet and Scribe) (Live at Big Fan)	6:14
3.	"Never Be Alone" (Live at Big Fan)	3:40
4.	"You Like It" (Live at Big Fan)	3:01
5.	"Remember Us" (featuring JoJo) (Live at Big Fan)	3:46
6.	"Choose" (with Hamo Dell)	3:49
7.	"Bigger"	2:56
8.	"Tua" (featuring Ibanez Maeva)	3:07
9.	"Give"	3:18
10.	"Come Back Home" (featuring Canaan Ene) (Canaan Ene remix))	3:10

== Charts ==
=== Weekly charts ===
Chart performance for All In
Chart (2022)	Peak position
New Zealand Albums (RMNZ)	3

=== Year-end charts ===
Year-end chart performance for All In
Chart (2022)	Position
New Zealand Artist Albums (RMNZ)	15

== Certifications and sales ==
Region	Certification	Certified units/sales
New Zealand (RMNZ)	Gold	7,500^{‡}
^{‡} Sales+streaming figures based on certification alone.
