= Canaan Ene =

New Zealand producer and videographer

- Born: Canaan Ene Ponifasio; May 17, 1998 (age 28)

YouTube information
- Channel: Canaan Ene
- Genre: Reggae Music
- Views: 5.90 million

Canaan Ene is a New Zealand musician, producer and videographer. He is most known for producing reggae music. He is currently based in South Auckland.

== Early life ==
Ene, who is of Samoan descent with familial ties to the villages of Malie, Leauvaʻa, Vaieʻe, and Saleaula, was raised playing music in church. Ene attended King's College After leaving high school, he pursued a career in videography before venturing back into music in 2020.

== Career ==
Ene is a music producer.

=== 2020-2022 ===
Ene launched a TikTok series entitled "Every Song Is A Reggae Song," in which he remixes popular songs in a reggae style. Initially conceived as a way to pass time during the COVID-19 pandemic, the series quickly went viral, prompting Ene to pursue it as a full-time career.

In 2021, he collaborated with NZ singer Stan Walker on an official reggae remix for his track "Come Back Home". The song went on to be released on Stan Walker's seventh studio album "All In" in 2022.

=== 2023-2024 ===
In March 2023, Ene released a reggae cover of Bruno Mars' "Talking To The Moon", featuring New Zealand vocalist Wayno. The song peaked at #14 on the Aotearoa Music Charts

In June 2023, Ene released a reggae cover of Men At Work's "Down Under" with Hawaiian band Kapena. Ene was also nominated in three categories at the Pacific Music Awards for "Best Pacific Language", "Best Pacific Roots/Reggae Artist' and "NZ On Air Best Pacific Music Video".

In October 2023, Ene released "It's You", an original reggae song with Australian-based rap group STNDRD and reggae band Tomorrow People, which peaked at #4 on the Aotearoa Music Charts.

In 2024, he released the single "Fijian Lewa", a collaborative release with Fijian artist Kuki and Jamaican artist Conkarah.

=== 2025-2026 ===
In January 2026, Ene collaborated with band Son & Water on their single “SAW,” their fourth project together. The song reached No. 2 on the Hot 40 chart, No. 1 on the Hot 20 Aotearoa chart, and No. 3 on YouTube’s Trending chart. It surpassed 400,000 streams on Spotify within 20 days of release.
