= George Veikoso =

Musical artist known as Fiji (1970–2025)

George "Fiji" Veikoso
- Veikoso in concert in 2024

Background information
- Also known as: Fiji; George Fiji
- Born: George Brooks Veikoso; 10 May 1970; Tailevu Province, Fiji
- Died: 24 July 2025 (aged 55) Suva, Fiji
- Genres: Reggae; world; R&B; ska; jazz; hip-hop
- Occupations: Singer-songwriter; musician
- Instrument: Vocals
- Years active: 1987–2025
- Label: Indigenous Alliance

George Brooks Veikoso (10 May 1970 – 24 July 2025), known professionally as Fiji, was a Fijian singer-songwriter, musician, producer and occasional actor. He was from Buretu, Nakelo in the Tailevu Province and both of his parents had Tongan & Fijian ancestry. He grew up in the urban area of Raiwaqa in Fiji before moving to Hawaiʻi.

== Early life ==
Born on 10 May 1970 in Tailevu, Fiji, Veikoso's first professional singing appearance earned him $5 from the audience. He liked singing in the church as a child. He credited three relatives for helping him reach his goals including his uncle, Isireli Racule who worked on Elvis Presley's Drums of the Islands, his other uncle and Fijian jazz star, Sakiusa Bulicokocoko and Paul Stevens. Racule wrote and composed the original, non-English version of Drums of the Islands in Polynesian languages while using the name "Bula Laie." Veikoso joined Fijian band Rootstrata in 1987 but left the same year for Hawaiʻi due to the 1987 Fijian coups d'état.

== Career ==
In 1998 Veikoso won the Na Hoku Hanohano Award for Male Vocalist of the year and Favorite Entertainer of the year.

He earned numerous other industry accolades and awards including "Favorite Entertainer of the Year" and "People's Choice Award". FIJI's collaboration on the "Island Warriors" compilation album earned a Grammy-nomination for Best Reggae Album in 2002.

Fiji also co-wrote and sang the season 11 theme song "Let Me Be the One" with Glenn Medeiros and Carlos Villalobos for the TV show, Baywatch and he acted in the 2002 surfer film Blue Crush.

He produced and released many albums during his career, including "Evolution", "Born and Raised" and "Grattitude". One of his all-time and most popular songs is "Lia".

In 2014, he was awarded the Best Pacific International Artist Award at the Pacific Music Awards.

In December 2021, he won the Pacific Music Awards, Manukau Institute of Technology Lifetime Achievement Award for his decades-long contribution to the Polynesian reggae scene.

In 2023, Fiji's catalogue surpassed over 500 million streams on digital streaming platforms.

In September 2024, Veikoso hosted Homecoming Fiji, a two-day concert at the King Charles Park in Nadi, Fiji. The event featured an international lineup that included Maoli, J Boog, and Josh Tatofi, among others. According to estimates, the concert contributed approximately FJD$1,000,000 to Fiji's local economy.

Following the success of his Homecoming Concert, Fiji's Deputy Prime Minister Viliame Gavoka pledged the ministry's support for Veikoso's later endeavours and called on stakeholders to collaborate for an even bigger showcase of Fijian artistry.

== Death ==
Veikoso died in Suva, Fiji on 24 July 2025, at the age of 55. On 11 August, his family and estate announced via Instagram they'd be livestreaming his funeral service the following day for fans worldwide. The funeral was streamed on Veikoso's official YouTube channel. Veikoso was laid to rest at Lovonilase Cemetery in Suva following a funeral service at the Vodafone Arena attended by hundreds. Among those present were musicians Tenelle, Danny Kennedy, Finn Gruva, and Canaan Ene, as well as the Burebasaga High Chief Ro Teimumu Kepa, Deputy Prime Minister Viliame Gavoka, Minister for Justice Siromi Turaga, and former heavyweight boxer David Tua.

A tribute concert in his memory held at the Waikiki Shell in Honolulu on 13 September drew 28,500 people including overflow attendees in Kapiʻolani Park.

== Discography ==
=== Charted albums ===
List of charted albums, with selected details
| Title | Details | Peak chart positions |
| Title | Details | NZ |
|---|---|---|
| Born and Raised | Released: 1996; Label: Precise | 36 |
| Grattitude | Released: 2000; Label: Precise | 50 |
| Born and Raised II: The Rebirth | Released: 2013; Label: Precise | 18 |

=== Charted songs ===
| Title | Year | Peak chart positions | Album |
| Title | Year | NZ | Album |
|---|---|---|---|
| "Sweet Darlin'" | 1996 | 21 | Born and Raised |
| "Jowenna" | 2004 | 20 | Independence Day |
| "Come On Over" (featuring Papa) | 2006 | 33 | Xperience |
| "Morning Ride" | 2006 | 30 | Xperience |
| "Lonely Days" (featuring Boog) | 2013 | 15 | Born and Raised II: The Rebirth |
| "One Way" | 2025 | 6 | |
| "Daydream" | 2025 | — (Note: "Daydream" did not enter the NZ Top 40 Singles Chart, but peaked at number 18 on the NZ Hot Singles Chart.) | Non-album singles |
| "Cruise" (Remix) (with Lomez Brown and Finn Gruva) | 2025 | — (Note: "Cruise" (Remix) did not enter the NZ Top 40 Singles Chart, but peaked at number 10 on the NZ Hot Singles Chart.) | Non-album singles |
