= John Pulu =

Television presenter and broadcast journalist

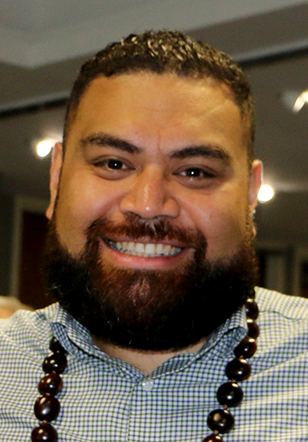
- Pulu in 2020
- Education: Bachelor of communication studies, Auckland University of Technology
- Occupations: Broadcast journalist, television presenter, reporter, and director, community advocate
- Years active: 2010–present
- Known for: Televsion presenter and reporter for Tagata Pasifika

Pulu speaks on PMC Pacific Media Freedom in 2012

External videos
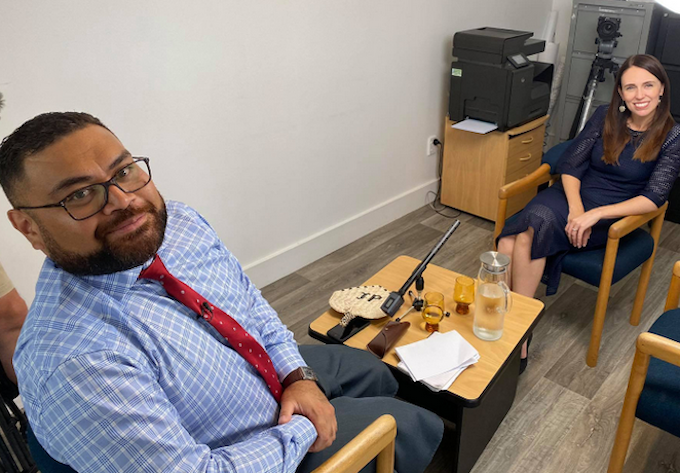
- John Pulu interviews Jacinda Ardern, RNZ, 2021
- PMN interview with John Pulu 20260304, Pacific Media Network, 2026
- What does the Tongan language mean to you? - John Pulu, Bluwave TV, 2019
- John Pulu #LIVE in Ōtāhuhu with Mate Ma’a Tonga old boys, Tagata Pasifika, 2018
- Connecting our Voices with John Pulu, Pasifika Wire, 2025

John Pulu is a New Zealand television presenter, broadcast journalist, reporter, and director, best known for his work on the TVNZ Pacific current affairs programme Tagata Pasifika.

== Early life and education ==
Pulu is of Tongan and Fijian descent and grew up in Auckland, New Zealand. Pulu is from the The Kingdom of Tonga. His family is from the suburb of Kolomotu‘a on the island of Tongatapu, as well as to the suburb of Holopeka within the Ha‘apai islands in Tonga. Additionally, he also has links to the Lau Islands of Fiji.

While in high school, he interned at Tagata Pasifika, which motivated him to pursue a career in media.

He enrolled at the Auckland University of Technology (AUT), where he completed a Bachelor of Communication Studies with a major in television. His studies included practical training across various production disciplines, including camera operation, directing, and presenting. During his undergraduate studies, he produced the short cultural documentaries The Modern Afo of Tonga and Kava Commune, the latter exploring the customs of traditional Tongan kava ceremonies within New Zealand. During his final year, he received an AUT and Pacific Islands Media Association scholarship. He graduated in 2010, receiving both the Spasifik Magazine prize and the Pacific Media Centre Storyboard Award for diversity journalism.

He graduated in 2010. After completing his degree, he transitioned into professional television journalism, securing a permanent role as a director and reporter for Tagata Pasifika.

== Career ==
Following his graduation, Pulu joined SunPix, the production company responsible for broadcasting Tagata Pasifika.

He began working as a reporter for the programme, covering issues affecting Pacific communities both within New Zealand and across the broader Pacific region. His broadcast portfolio includes coverage of community governance, cultural preservation, regional climate issues, and language initiatives. Over his tenure, he transitioned into the role of studio co-presenter alongside Marama T-Pole.

Pulu serves as a master of ceremonies for Pacific diaspora cultural events, awards nights, and community functions throughout New Zealand.
