= Matthew Salapu-Faiumu =

New Zealand composer and music producer

Matthew Salapu-Faiumu Anonymouz
- Occupations: Producer, Composer, Sound Designer, Creative Director, Co-Founder of 37hz Productions
- Notable work: APO: Remix the Orchestra (2013) Resample: Guahan (2016) 4 THA LUMANA'I (2018)
- Spouse: Noma Sio Faiumu (2012 - Present)
- Awards: Pacific Music Awards - Most Promising Artist (2008) International Music Council's Musical Rights Award - APO: Remix the Orchestra (2013)
- Website: https://anonymouz.com/

Matthew Salapu-Faiumu, aka Anonymouz, is a composer and sound/music/video producer of Samoan descent, based in Onehunga, New Zealand. Matthew-Salapu under the name Anonymouz has been a pioneering figure within the Pacific NZ music industry for over 15 years. Within the New Zealand and Pacific music industry, he was a founding member of the Pacific Music Awards (2005) and won a Phillip Fuemana Award, Most Promising Artist in 2008. He was appointed by the Auckland Philharmonia Orchestra to be the Music Director for their APO Remix the Orchestra programme (2013). The show received an International Music Council (IMC) Musical Rights Award from the United Nations (2013). He was commissioned by NZ Pacific Radio stations Radio 531 PI & NIU FM to create their new imaging music which still plays every four minutes to the present day (2014). He was a part of the Aotearoa delegation that attended the Festival of Pacific Arts in Guåhan, Guam (2016). There he presented his 20-minute soundscape work Resample: Guahan to much praise.

Anonymouz has continued to have his work commissioned by prominent artists and art companies over his career. These include, Auckland Art Gallery, Auckland Theatre Company, Black Grace, Auckland Transport, Auckland Council, Royal NZ Ballet and Massey University.

Anonymouz is currently co-director of his arts production company 37hz Productions. He shares the running of the company with his wife and managing director Noma Sio-Faiumu since 2017.

== Awards, residencies and notable achievements ==
- Founding Member of the Pacific Music Awards (2005)
- Recipient of the Phillip Fuemana Award, Most Promising Artist at the Pacific Music Awards (2008)
- One of six of Prime Minister John Key's NZ Artist delegation where they took a trip to Samoa for the 50th anniversary of independence celebrations (2012)
- Music Director of APO: Remix the Orchestra the year the show received an International Music Council (IMC) Musical Rights Award from the UN (2013)
- Recipient of the Emerging Pacific Artist Award at Creative NZ Arts Pasifika Awards (2016)
- Nominated for the Best Producer Award at the Pacific Music Awards (2018)
- Recipient funding for Music Development from NZ on Air (2021)
- Won Sound Designer of the Year at the Wellington Theatre Awards for his work on UPU (2021)
- Recipient of a Massey University Toi Rauwharangi Pacific Arts Residency (2021)

== Work catalogue ==
Music production
Year	Artist	Track title	Features	Role
2010	Anonymouz	Anticipatin'	The Hypnotics	Anonymouz second single, self-produced
2011	The Hypnotics	Amour	-	Producer
2012	LAYBAQ	Mangere Summertime	Dok2	Producer
2012	The Hypnotics	Some Say	-	Producer
2012	ERMEHN	Trained to Kill (Album)	Selected Artists	Producer
2013	ERMEHN	As Real As It Gets	FaceKilla, Young Sid, Mr Sicc, Dok2	Producer
2013	LAYBAQ	Sincerely Yours	Rosita Vai, Magnique Choir	Producer
2014	Anonymouz	An Artistic Response to the Teina Pora Case	Ermehn, Tha Movement, Mareko, Teva, Che Fu, Devolo, Dok2, Poetik, Laybaq, Mr Sicc	An independent collective artistic response to the controversial Teina Pora case
2014	ERMEHN	Livin' In The Hood	Mr Sicc, Teva, DG	Producer
2014	LAYBAQ	Soul Food Sunday	Tha Movement, Tree Vaifale	Producer
2015	Tha Movement	Daddy Loves You	-	Producer
2016	Machete District	Oriana	Mz J	Producer
2017	LaCoco	Free To Be Remix	-	Producer
2017	Tha Movement	No Doubt About It	-	Producer
2017	SNARE	Vodka and Vaniah	LaCoco	Producer
2017	Anonymouz & Dok2	These Summer Days	Devolo, Swiss	Producer and vocalist
2018	Tha Movement	MASTA	Poetik, MC Arme, SMV,King Kapisi, Mareko, Kas The Freestyle	Producer. This song was also featured on the Blockbuster Fast and Furious Presents: Hobbs and Shaw Soundtrack
2018	Tha Movement	The Undisciplined Son EP	Selected Artists	Producer
2019	Anonymouz	Māngere Peace Vigil for Christchurch: Be Right There	Mangere community members	Response to the 2019 Christchurch Mosque shooting. Produced by Anonymouz
2019	Lani Alo	Alo i ou Faiva	Livingstone Efu	Produced and Directed under 37 Hz Productions
2019	SNARE	Leasing Lingos	Hamokane, Kas The Freestyle, Gfes	Director and Producer
2020	SNARE	Oasis (Se'i Loa)	-	Director and Producer
2020	Tha Movement	Unwind	Mr Sicc	Produced, Visual Director
2023	SNARE	Leai Se Paga	-	Producer and vocalist

Composition / sound design
Year	Artist / company	Title	Work
2012	Anonymouz	Return to Hawaiki	Soundscape
2014	Pacific Media Network - 531PI & NIU FM	n/a	Composed and Produced the 90 second imaging music still in use to this present day.
2014	Anonymouz	RESAMPLE: SOUTH AUCKLAND	Soundscape
2015	Te Oro Community	n/a	Permanent public soundscapes installation
2015	Favona Primary School	Jonah Lomu Tribute	Sound Production for a group of Favona Primary School students tribute to Jonah Lomu
2016	Festival of Pacific Arts 2016 - Aotearoa Delegation	RESAMPLE: GUAHAN	Soundscape
2017	Waka Kotahi NZ Transport Agency - Innovation Hub	Te Aramua Future Streets	Award Winner Video sound composition
2018	Black Grace Dance Company & Anonymouz	Under the Au'	Creative Director / Music and Visual Producer collaborating with four Black Grace dancers, Isitolo Alesana, SNARE and Dok2.
2019	Jeremy Leatinu'u	When the Moon sees the Sun	Composer. The piece was presented at the 2019 Honolulu Biennial.
2020	New Zealand Government	Covid-19 Updates: Pacific Language Translation	Anonymouz alongside Areta Tanoa'i were commissioned by the Ministry of Health to translate the COVID-19 updates into 9 Pacific languages
2021	New Zealand Government	NZ Government Official Dawn Raid Apology	Produced the opening sound design for the event
2021	37 Hz Productions - Anonymouz	RESAMPLE: TATAU	Soundscape
2022	Ministry for Pacific Peoples	Dawn Raids Apology Commemoration at Ngati Whatua Orakei Marae	Commemorating his contributions to the event
2023	COP 28 Conference Pasifika Voices 23'	They Taking Pictures of us in the Water	Creative Director, Music Producer, Music Mixer, Videographer and Editor in collaboration with Audrey Brown Pereira

Film, theatre and exhibitions
Year	Type	Artist / company	Title	Role
2010	TV Show	Drum Productions / TVNZ	Pacific Beat St	Created the Pacific Beat St theme song
2011	Short Film	The Uso Bike Ride	Riding for my Father - The Uso Bike Ride Story	Produced Soundtrack
2014	Short Film	New Zealand Film Commission - Fresh Shorts	Rising Dust - Ancestors Dance Scene	Composed and Performed music. Working alongside Paris Goebel and The Royal Family Dance Crew.
2014	Short Film	Mangere Arts Centre	Tusalava by Len Lye	Created a new soundtrack over the 1929 abstract animation film alongside composers, Matatumua Opeloge Ah Sam and Poulima Salima
2015	Theatre Show	Bats Theatre	2080	Sound Designer
2016	Visual EP	Anonymouz & 100+ Mangere-Otahuhu community members	My Neighbourhood: Mangere-Otahuhu Visual Music EP	Director and Producer
2018	Theatre Show	Auckland Arts Festival - Whanui Programme	4 THA LUMANA'I	A theatre show led by Anonymouz about finding the parallels between traditional Samoan customs and contemporary hip-hop artforms
2018	Short Film	Te Papa Tongarewa: Museum of NZ	Len Lye	A retrospective on Len Lye featuring Anonymouz's previous work on Tusalava by Len Lye
2018	Dance Theatre	Black Grace Dance Company	Crying Men	Composer
2018	Exhibition	Otara Music and Arts Centre	OMAC 30 - Sustain the Wairua	Curator
2020	Theatre Show	Silo Theatre	UPU	Sound Designer
2020	Video Series	Mangere Arts Centre - Nga Tohu o Uenuku	Te Huritau Tekau Video Series - 10 Year Anniversary	Videographer and Sound Designer
2021	TV Show	FRESH TV / TVNZ	Fresh TV Theme Music	Commissioned to create a new theme song for FRESH TV
2021	Showcase	Giant Steps	Artist in Resonance	Performance Showcase
2022	Installation Showcase	Yuki Kihara for the Venice Biennale '22	Paradise Camp	Producer of Kihara's music and digital sonic branding for her NZ representative showcase at the Venice Biennale.
2022	Exhibition	Anonymouz / 37 Hz Productions	Lean into the Pain: Archives of a Tatau Thesis	Multi-Media Installation
2023	Dance Theatre	Black Grace Dance Company	Paradise Rumour	Composer

Workshops / mentoring
Year	Company / organisation / institution	Work
2010 - 2016	Auckland Philharmonia Orchestra	Multiple roles including: Music Director, Mentor, Composer for APO: Remix the Orchestra over his involvement with the programme
2012	Auckland Museum	IamGI project - In response to the Auckland Macro Report (2011) Anonymouz mentors six groups of youth on how to make a soundscape in relation to their home of Glen Innes.
2015	Vodaphone Events Centre Schools Programme	Mentoring Onehunga High School students on music composition as a part of The Moovit Dance Project
2016	Vodaphone Events Centre Schools Programme	Mentoring Onehunga High School students on music composition as a part of The Moovit Dance Project
2018	Haeata School	Mentoring students in music production
2019	TAUTAI Fresh Horizons Music Production Workshop	Mentoring high school students around Wellington on sound production and music mixing and documenting for TAUTAI
2019	TAUTAI Pacific Arts Trust	First Fridays Creative Presentation
2020	Te Kura Toi Whakaari o Aotearoa: NZ Drama School	Mentoring the graduating third year students in sound production and music mixing to create their own works
2022	Impact Hub Waikato	Youth Music Workshop
2023	Impact Hub Waikato	Youth Music Workshop. Led the creation of a music video for the song He Kakano Ahau. The programme was very successful and saw a 12% increase in participants' well-being across the youth groups.

Videography
Year	Title	Work
2015	Aganu'u Fa'asamoa 101 Melbourne	Documenting the first-of-its-kind event
2019	Is That Us? - Indigenous Pride	Mentoring high school students around Wellington on sound production and music mixing and documenting for TAUTAI
2019	Protect Ihumatao	Documenting the protests at Ihumatao
2019	Southside Talanoa Series	Documenting the talanoa
2020	Black Lives Matter Solidarity March	Documenting the protest

Guest speaking / judge
Year	Event
2017	Guest Judge for the Rep Fm & AYEBRO collaboration event 'Rep Your Beats'
2022	AMPS South Auckland
2023	The Pasifika Innovation and Entrepreneurship Talanoa run by the University of Auckland Business School's Centre for Innovation and Entrepreneurship
2023	Toipoto Creative Careers Programme
