= Hare and Hounds, East Sheen =

Pub in East Sheen, London

Coordinates: 51°27′54.0″N 0°15′52.7″W

Hare and Hounds

General information
- Type: Public house
- Location: Upper Richmond Road, East Sheen, in the London Borough of Richmond upon Thames, England

Listed Building – Grade II
- Official name: Hare and Hounds public house
- Designated: 25 May 1983
- Reference no.: 1253017

The Hare and Hounds is a Young's public house at Upper Richmond Road, East Sheen, in the London Borough of Richmond upon Thames. It is Grade II listed. A former coaching inn, it was built by an unknown architect in the early 19th century. It has a 1930s interior and an extensive garden.
