= Tagata Pasifika =

New Zealand television programme

- Presented by: John Pulu; Marama T-Pole
- Country of origin: New Zealand
- Original language: English

Production
- Executive producer: Taualeo'o Stephen Stehlin
- Producers: John Utanga; Ngaire Fuata
- Running time: 30 minutes

Original release
- Network: TV One
- Release: 4 April 1987 – present

Tagata Pasifika is an English language New Zealand programme which screens on TVNZ's TV ONE and on Māori Television, first broadcast in 1987. This programme is made to specifically meet the niche market of New Zealand's Pacific Islander (Pasifika) population.

== Content ==
Tagata Pasifika features current events from both New Zealand and Polynesia. The show features report coverage of Pacific Island cultural events such as the annual Pasifika festival along with arts and profiles.

== Naming ==
Tagata Pasifika was first coined in the mid 1980s as a reference to people with genealogical connections to islands within Melanesia, Polynesia, Micronesia, French Polynesia and all others scattered throughout the Pacific Ocean but had chosen to live in Aotearoa New Zealand and identified Aotearoa New Zealand as their home base. There has been some dispute over the correct spelling of 'Pasifika', sometimes spelt Pasefika, Pacifica, Pacifika. Tagata Pasifika is generally accepted as correct and publicly reinforced by the Television New Zealand programme now also known by the same name but was previously spelt Tangata Pasifika.

Samoan = Pasefika Tongan = Pasifiki

== Reporters ==
- John Utanga (Cook Islands)
- Marama T-Pole (Tuvalu)
- John Pulu (Tonga)
- Soana Aholelei (Tonga)
- Karima Fai'ai (Samoa)
- Alistar Kata (Cook Islands)
- Johnson Raela (Cook Islands)
- Taylor Aumua (Fijian Samoa)
- Moana Makapelu Lee (Niuean/Cook Islands)
