= AKA Brown =

New Zealand music group

AKA Brown was a New Zealand music group.

They achieved success in their native country.
