= New Zealand Music Commission =

New Zealand arts agency

New Zealand Music Commission.

The New Zealand Music Commission (NZMC) (Māori: Te Reo Reka o Aotearoa) is a government funded arts agency committed to growing New Zealand music business, both domestically and internationally. It is governed by a board of trustees made up of members representing most areas of the New Zealand music industry, including musicians & managers through the Music Managers Forum (MMF), independent labels through Independent Music NZ (IMNZ), major labels through the Recording Industry Association of NZ (RIANZ), and songwriters through the Australasian Performing Right Association (APRA.)

== Activities ==
Their range of projects include NZ Music Month, free legal advice service Music Law, the collection of statistics on the local industry, and seminar events such as Warrant of Fitness (featuring expatriate NZ music industry practitioners and other international speakers) – all aimed at building the NZ music infrastructure and up-skilling music industry practitioners in aspects such as management, touring, knowledge of copyright and other industry topics.

For NZ artists embarking on an international career, the 'Outward Sound' team assists with financial grants for those looking to develop business offshore and increase their exports. Their focus is primarily on international music market development, working in conjunction with the artists’ managers. They are also responsible for co-ordinating the NZ presence at key offshore events – including the MIDEM trade fair in Cannes, France, the South by Southwest conference in Austin, Texas, and the CMJ Music Marathon in New York City.

The Commission’s Education team works with the Ministry of Education to provide services and resources for the secondary school music curriculum, including interactive CD/DVD resources. In addition to this, the Musicians Mentoring and Bands Mentoring In Schools (the latter in partnership with Smokefree Rockquest) programme offers students the practical opportunity to learn intensively from their heroes, as well as providing professional development opportunities for teachers.

The Commission also run the New Zealand Music Month, an annual celebration of New Zealand's music, which takes place each May. The NZ Music Commission works in partnership with a wide range of organisations associated with the NZ music industry, including the Recording Industry Association of NZ (RIANZ), Australasian Performing Right Association (APRA), NZ On Air, Radio Broadcasters Association (RBA), Independent Music NZ (IMNZ) and Music Managers Forum (MMF), to coordinate activity during NZ Music Month. During 2000, the event increased playtime of New Zealand music from 10% to 23%.
