= Dei Hamo =

- Also known as: Hamo, Sani Sagala
- Born: Sanerivi Sagala
- Origin: Auckland, New Zealand
- Genre: Hip hop
- Occupations: Rapper; singer; songwriter; record producer; director
- Years active: 2003-present
- Label: Aviator Music

Sanerivi "Sani" Sagala (born 24 August 1974), better known by his stage name Dei Hamo, is a New Zealand rapper, producer and director.

Dei Hamo, which can be translated as "The Samoan", has won various awards for his chart-topping music and his first album First Edition, released in 2005. He lives in Māngere, Auckland.

== Background ==
Dei Hamo's musical career spans more than 15 years. He was part of the Proud hip hop tour and has worked with some of New Zealand's top musicians and performers, including Boh Runga, Tha Feelstyle and DJ Sammy B. He has supported a number of international acts including The Black Eyed Peas and Busta Rhymes.

Dei Hamo went to Aorere College, Papatoetoe in the late 1980s where he was first exposed to the hip hop genre. Hamo spent his days and nights perfecting his craft, later claiming to have written a song a day.

Having a passion for film and directing, in 2010 he was asked by a close friend Amy Raumati (also known as Lady Sheeq) to direct a music video for her. Dei Hamo agreed and has since directed music videos for other artists. He directs the music videos under his real name, Sani Sagala, as he aims to write and direct movies in the near future.

== Music ==
In 2004, Dei Hamo's first single "We Gon' Ride" spent five consecutive weeks at number one on New Zealand's music chart, and three months in the top 10. The track went platinum. It also reached the top 40 in Australia. Later singles have included "This Is My Life" and "Cry again", the latter containing lyrics from Split Enz's song "I Hope I Never" performed by Tim Finn.

== Discography ==
Dei Hamo discography
- Studio albums: 1
- Soundtrack albums: 1
- Singles: 5
- Music videos: 3
- Featured singles: 1

=== Albums ===
Year	Title	Details	Peak chart positions
Year	Title	Details	NZ
2005	First Edition	Released: 31 March 2005; Label: Hiruys; Catalogue: 9825885	13
"—" denotes a recording that did not chart or was not released in that territory.

=== Singles ===
Year	Title	Peak chart positions		Album
Year	Title	NZ	AUS	Album
2004	"We Gon' Ride"	1	31	First Edition
2005	"To Tha Floor"	5	—	First Edition
2005	"This Is My Life"	38	—	First Edition
2005	Cry Again (featuring Tim Finn)	—	—	First Edition
2008	"Let's Fly"	—	—	Non-album single
2009	"Lyka Teen"	—	—	Non-album single
2010	"Hold U Down"	—	—	Non-album single
2011	"Mama Say" (Candice Rhind & Dei Hamo)	—	—	Non-album single
2011	"Right Here"	—	—	Non-album single
"—" denotes a recording that did not chart or was not released in that territory.

== Awards ==
Year	Nominee / work	Award	Result	Ref.
2005	Dei Hamo - First Edition	New Zealand Music Awards - Breakthrough Artist of the Year	Nominated	
2005	Dei Hamo - "We Gon' Ride	New Zealand Music Awards - Highest Selling New Zealand Single	Won	
2005	Chris Graham "We Gon' Ride" (Dei Hamo)	New Zealand Music Awards - Best Music Video	Won	
2005	Dei Hamo - "We Gon' Ride"	Pacific Music Awards - Best Pacific Male Artist	Nominated	
2005	Dei Hamo - "We Gon' Ride"	Pacific Music Awards - Best Pacific Urban Artist	Nominated	
2006	Dei Hamo - First Edition	Pacific Music Awards - Best Pacific Male Artist	Won	
2006	Dei Hamo - First Edition	Pacific Music Awards - Best Pacific Urban Artist	Won	

== Videography (as director) ==
Music videos directed by Sani Sagala (Dei Hamo) include:

Year	Artist	Song
2010	Amy Raumati	"Becos of Love"
2010	Devolo featuring. Erakah and Dei Hamo	"Lost Love"
2011	Pieter T	"Forever"/"Fix That"
2011	DJ Sirvere featuring JR K One Mareko and J. Williams	"Major Flavors"
2011	Tyree	"I Want It All"
2012	"Ahorangi" featuring Young Sid	"Pounamu"
2012	Amy Raumati featuring Ayla	"The Calling"
2012	PROVOKAL	"The Recipe Freestyle"
2012	XY featuring Dei Hamo	"Wait Until Tonight"
2012	Big Ka$h	"Cloze Off"
2012	Deach featuring Pieter T	"Be With You"
2013	Queen Shirl'e featuring D Love	"I Got You"
2013	Jae'O	"Find You"
2013	Stunna	Ain't No Thang
2013	MC AJ featuring Cookie	"Make You Mine"
2013	Drew featuring Tyree	"Tonight"
2013	Deach	"Be With You" Remix
2013	Pieter T starring Frankie Adams	"Right Here"
2013	Villains	"Volatile"
2013	Villains	"Volatile" Yuck Mix
2013	Deach featuring Pieter T	"Tell No Lie"
2013	Smashproof	"Forever"
2013	Pieter T	"Rumours"
2013	Abbie	Over You
2013	Smashproof	L.A.B
2014	Tyree featuring Jae'O	"I'm Ready"

== See also ==
- New Zealand hip hop
