= We Gon' Ride =

"We Gon Ride"

Single by Dei Hamo
- Released: 27 August 2004
- Recorded: 2004
- Genre: Rap/Hip-Hop
- Label: HiRuys Records
- Songwriter: Chong Nee

Dei Hamo singles chronology
"We Gon Ride" (2004)	"To Tha Floor" (2004)

"We Gon Ride" is a single by New Zealand rapper, Dei Hamo, released in 2004. On the singles charts, it peaked at # 1 in New Zealand and at # 31 in Australia.

== Music video ==
Ex New Zealand rugby/league star Matthew Ridge can be seen in the music video for the song.

== Track listings ==
CD single - (HiRuys 9823484)

1. "We Gon Ride" (Radio Edit)
2. "Hot Girl" (Single Edit)
3. "Pop Dat '03"
4. "We Gon Ride" (Instrumental)
5. "We Gon Ride" (A Capella)

== Charts ==
Chart (2004–05)	Peak position
Australia (ARIA)	31
New Zealand (Recorded Music NZ)	1
