= 2010 New Zealand Music Awards =

Annual New Zealand music awards ceremony

- Awarded for: Excellence in New Zealand music
- Sponsored by: Vodafone
- Date: 7 October 2010
- Location: Vector Arena, Auckland
- Country: New Zealand
- Hosted by: Shannon Ryan; Ben Hurley
- Website: http://www.nzmusicawards.co.nz

Television/radio coverage
- Network: C4

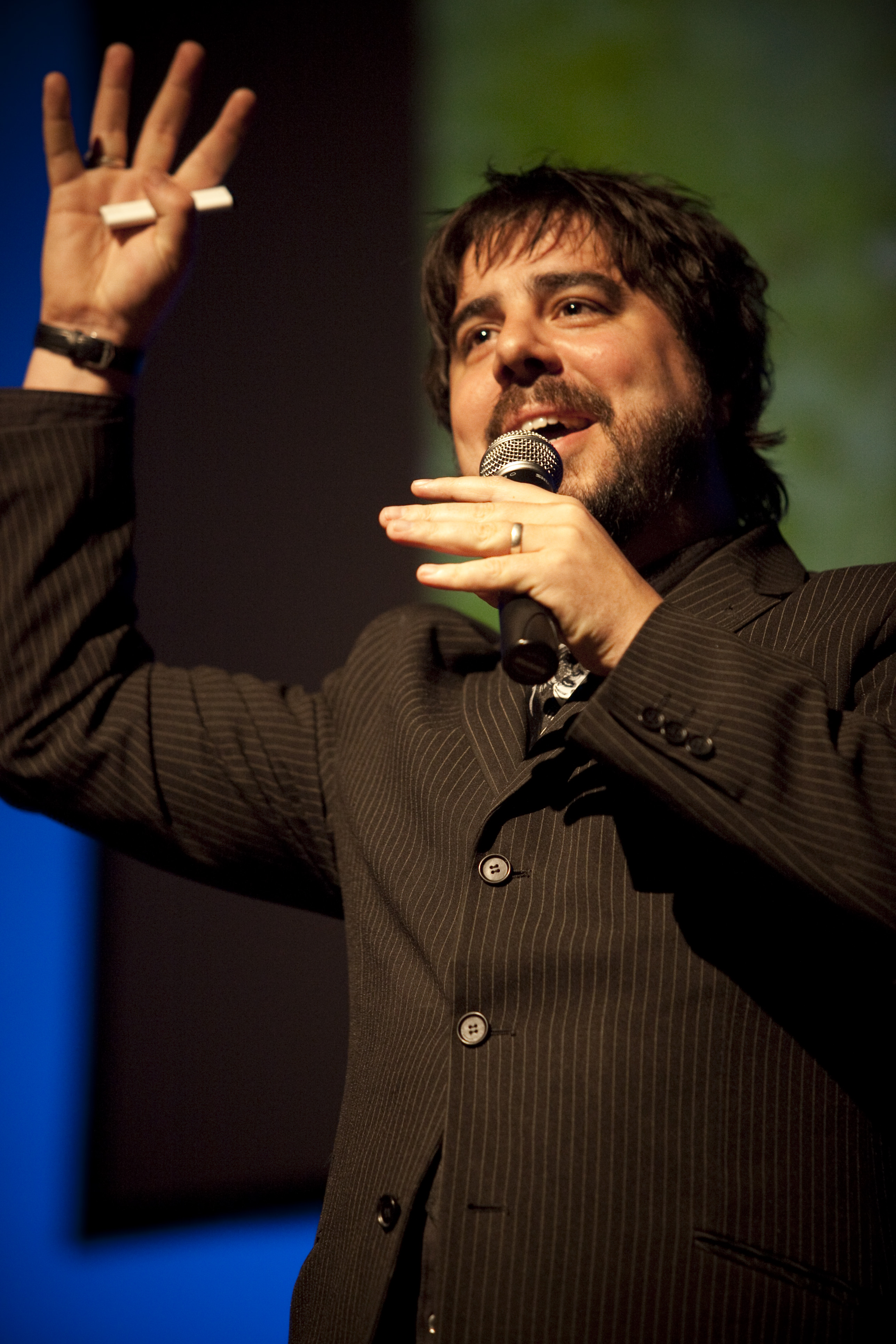
Ben Hurley co-hosted the awards.

The 2010 New Zealand Music Awards was the 44th holding of the annual ceremony featuring awards for musical artists based in or originating from New Zealand. Finalists for the three technical awards were announced on 16 August 2010 with winners announced on 1 September, the date on which finalists for 16 'non-technical' categories were revealed. Five 'non-technical' awards were presented without a group of finalists being selected. The awards ceremony took place on 7 October 2010 at Vector Arena, Auckland. Hosted by television presenter Shannon Ryan and comedian Ben Hurley, the ceremony was broadcast on television channel C4. Various musicians, most of whom had been nominated for awards, performed songs on the awards night.

Gin Wigmore and Dane Rumble each received six nominations, while The Phoenix Foundation received eight nominations, including three in technical categories. Wigmore's album Holy Smoke won three of the categories in which it was nominated, including Album of the Year, as well as the award for the highest selling New Zealand album. New Zealand-born Australian Idol winner Stan Walker won the People's Choice Award, as well as three awards featuring no finalists. "Just a Little Bit" by Kids of 88 was awarded the title of Single of the Year. Shihad won the Legacy Award, and were inducted into the New Zealand Music Hall of Fame.

== Nominees and winners ==
Winners are listed first and highlighted in boldface.

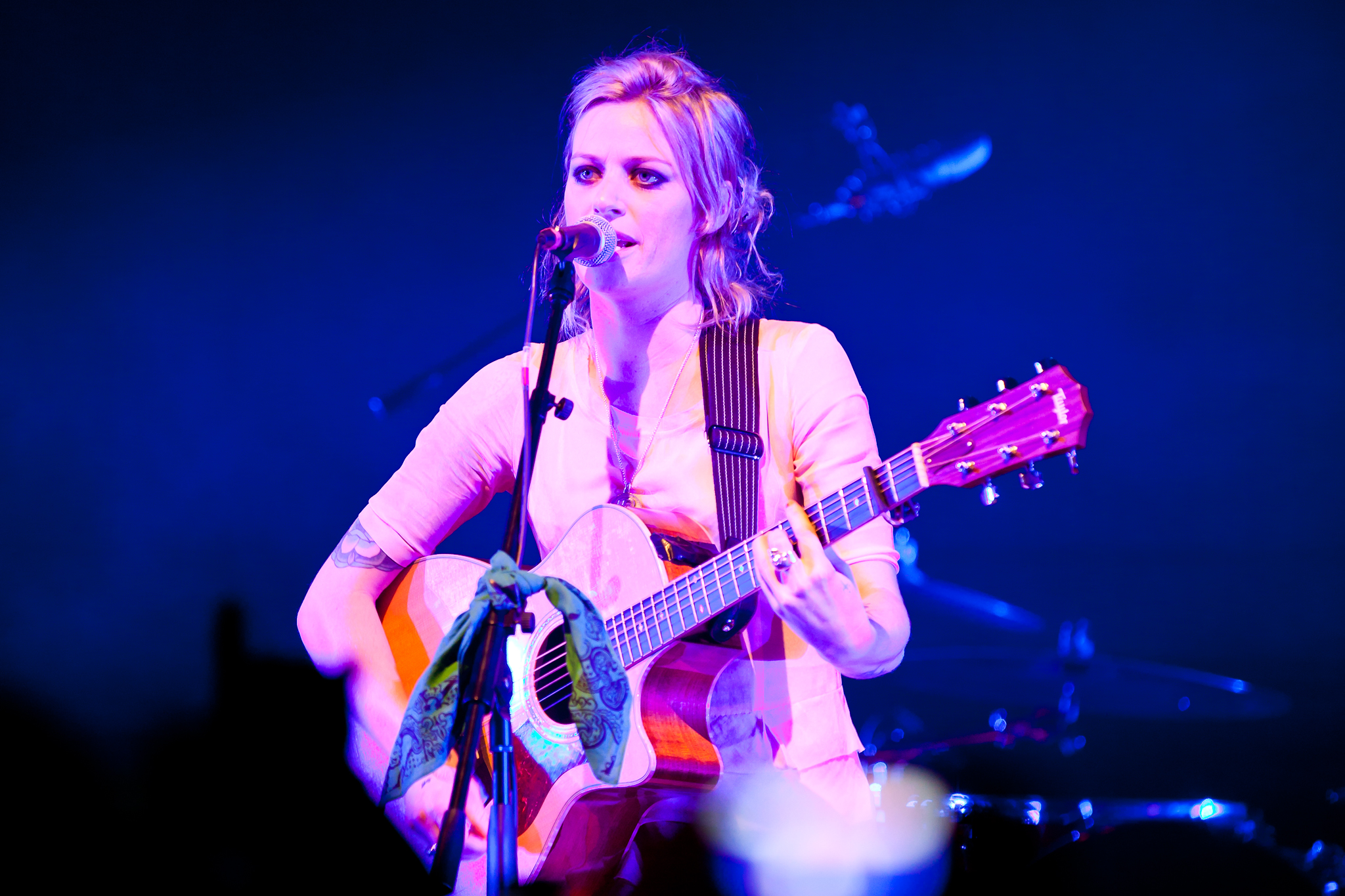
Gin Wigmore was nominated for six awards, winning four.

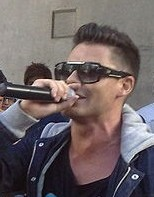
Dane Rumble was nominated in six categories, winning Best Male Solo Artist.

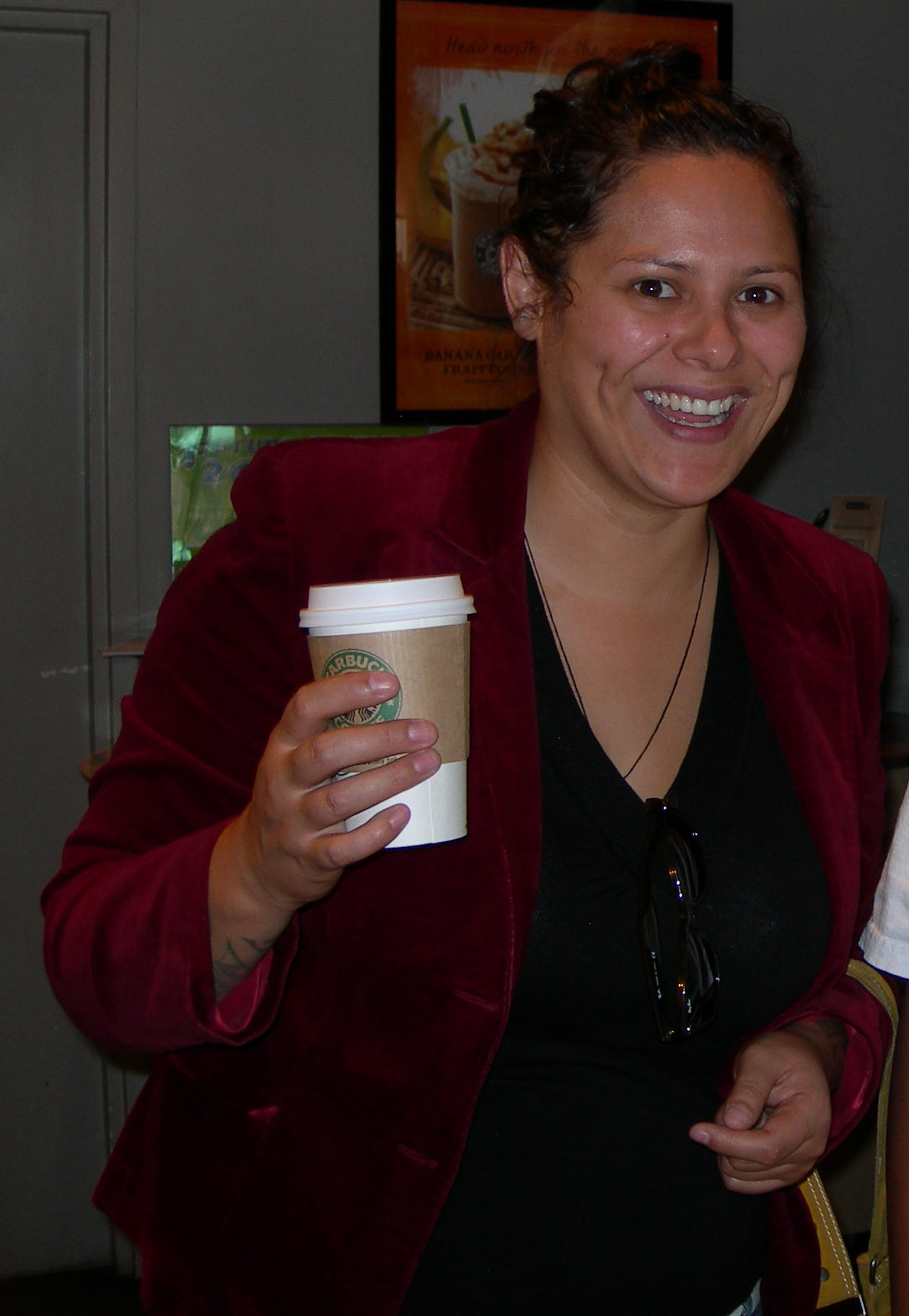
Anika Moa's Love in Motion won Best Female Solo Artist, as did her previous album, In Swings the Tide.

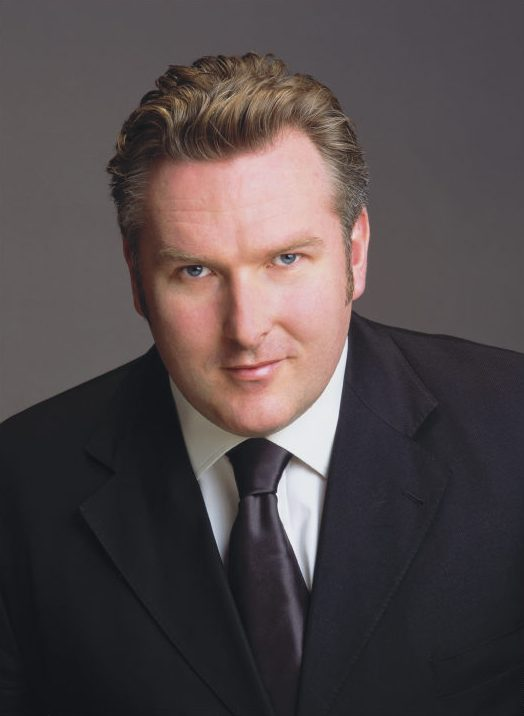
Simon O'Neill won Best Classical Album with Father & Son: Wagner Scenes & Arias.

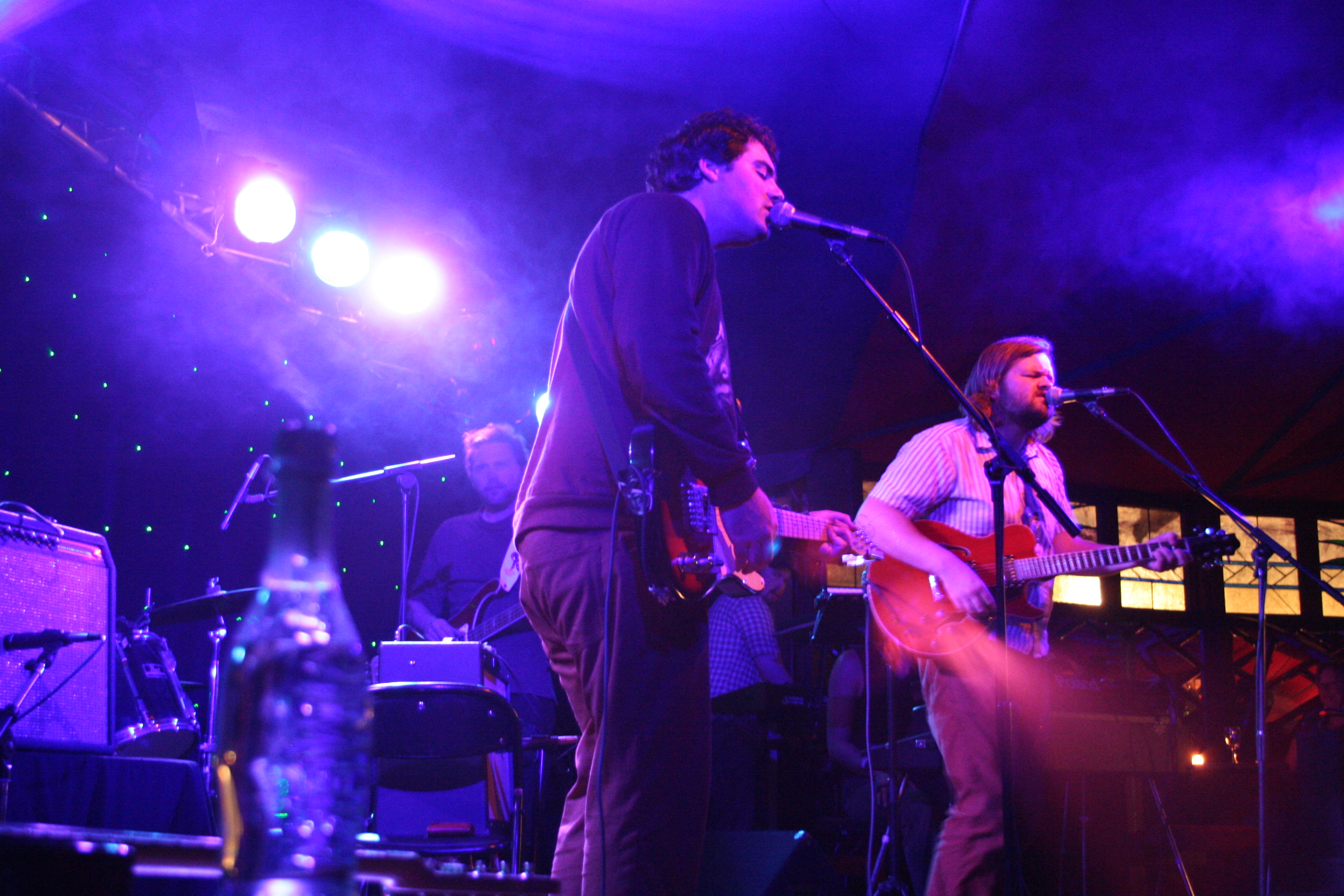
The Phoenix Foundation's album Buffalo won all three technical awards for its album cover, engineering and production

Key
† – Non-technical award
‡ – Technical award

Album of the Year†	Single of the Year†
Sponsored by Vodafone: **Gin Wigmore – Holy Smoke**; Anika Moa – Love in Motion; Dane Rumble – The Experiment; Shapeshifter – The System Is a Vampire; The Phoenix Foundation – Buffalo	Sponsored by Vodafone: **Kids of 88 – "Just a Little Bit"**; Dane Rumble – "Cruel"; Gin Wigmore – "Oh My"; J.Williams featuring Scribe – "You Got Me"; The Phoenix Foundation – "Buffalo"
Best Group†	Breakthrough Artist of the Year†
Sponsored by Steinlager: **The Phoenix Foundation – Buffalo**; Shapeshifter – The System Is a Vampire; The Checks – Alice by the Moon	Sponsored by Pacific Blue Airlines: **Gin Wigmore – Holy Smoke**; Artisan Guns – Autumn; Dane Rumble – The Experiment
Best Male Solo Artist†	Best Female Solo Artist†
**Dane Rumble – The Experiment**; Connan Mockasin – Please Turn Me Into the Snat; J.Williams – Young Love	Sponsored by Mazda: **Anika Moa – Love in Motion**; Gin Wigmore – Holy Smoke; Hollie Smith – Humour and the Misfortune of Others
Best Rock Album†	Best Pop Album†
Sponsored by PPNZ: **The Checks – Alice by the Moon**; Dimmer – Degrees of Existence; The Phoenix Foundation – Buffalo	**Gin Wigmore – Holy Smoke**; Anika Moa – Love in Motion; Dane Rumble – The Experiment
Best Urban / Hip Hop Album†	Best Aotearoa Roots Album†
**David Dallas – Something Awesome**; J.Williams – Young Love; Young Sid – What Doesn't Kill Me...	Sponsored by Kiwi FM: **Opensouls – Standing In The Rain**; Fly My Pretties – A Story; Hollie Smith – Humour and the Misfortune of Others
Best Music Video†	Best Electronica Album†
Sponsored by C4: **Tim van Dammen – "Just a Little Bit" (Kids of 88)**; Nathan Hickey – "Buffalo" (The Phoenix Foundation); Sam Peacocke – "Sleepeater" (Shihad)	**Jay Bulletproof – Soundtrack To Forever**; P-Money – Everything; Shapeshifter – The System Is a Vampire
Best Gospel / Christian Album†	Best Classical Album†
**Edwin Derricutt – Three Hours South**; John Michaelz – Walk on Water; Magnify – Wonderland	**Simon O'Neill – Father & Son: Wagner Scenes & Arias**; John Psathas – UKIYO; NZTrio – Flourishes; Strike Percussion – Sketches
Peoples' Choice Award†	Critics' Choice Prize†
Sponsored by Vodafone: **Stan Walker**; Gin Wigmore; Dane Rumble; Kids of 88; Shapeshifter	Sponsored by Gravity Coffee: **Street Chant**; The Naked and Famous; Home Brew
Highest selling New Zealand Single†	Highest selling New Zealand Album†
No finalists were announced in this category.: **Stan Walker – "Black Box"**; At the time of the awards, "Black Box" had been certified double platinum, denoting over 30,000 sales.	No finalists were announced in this category.: **Gin Wigmore – Holy Smoke**; At the time of the awards, Holy Smoke had been certified triple platinum, denoting over 45,000 shipments.
Radio Airplay Record of the Year†	International Achievement Award†
No finalists were announced in this category. Sponsored by New Zealand On Air: **Stan Walker – "Black Box"**	No finalists were announced in this category.: **Stan Walker**
Legacy Award†	Best Album Cover‡
No finalists were announced in this category. Sponsored by The New Zealand Herald: **Shihad**	**Paul Johnson – Buffalo (The Phoenix Foundation)**; Rebekah Atkins, Kieran Rynhart, Mikee Tucker and Anita Liu – A Story (Fly My Pretties); Ryan Marx – Everything (P-Money)
Best Engineer‡	Best Producer‡
Sponsored by the Music and Audio Institute of New Zealand (MAINZ): **Lee Prebble – Buffalo (The Phoenix Foundation)**; Andre Upston – Magnetic (Miriam Clancy); Lee Prebble – A Story (Fly My Pretties)	Sponsored by the Music and Audio Institute of New Zealand (MAINZ): **The Phoenix Foundation – Buffalo (The Phoenix Foundation)**; Jeremy Toy – Standing In The Rain (Opensouls); Lee Prebble and Barnaby Weir – A Story (Fly My Pretties)

== Presenters and performers ==
=== Presenters ===
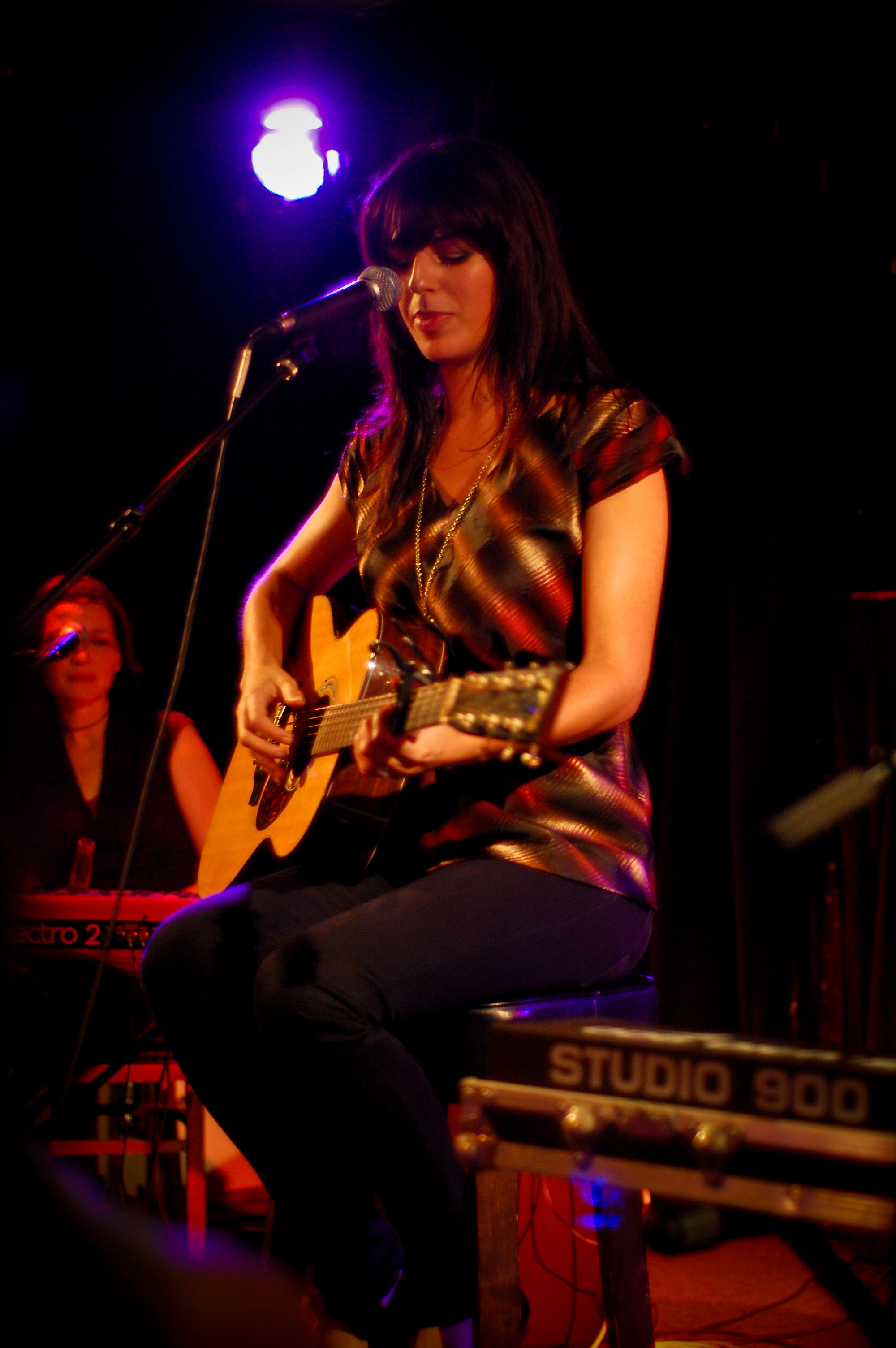
Brooke Fraser co-presented two awards, having won five awards in previous years.

Presenters of awards at the ceremony:

- Irish Boyzone singer Ronan Keating and New Zealand pop musician Brooke Fraser presented the awards for Album of the Year and Single of the Year.
- Actress Rose McIver and musician Liam Finn presented the awards for Best Group, Best Male Solo Artist and Best Female Solo Artist.
- Actress Robyn Malcolm and songwriter Don McGlashan presented the awards for Best Pop Album, Best Rock Album and Breakthrough Artist of The Year.
- Newsreader Sam Hayes and footballers Winston Reid and Tim Brown presented the awards for Best Urban / Hip Hop Album, Best Aotearoa Roots Album and Best Electronica Album.
- Entertainment reporter Kate Rodger presented the award for Best Music Video.
- Film and television producer Dave Gisbon presented the awards for Gospel / Christian Album and Best Classical Album.
- Rugby league players Lance Hohaia and Micheal Luck and the Vodafone 'Voice of the People' winner (Note: The Vodafone 'Voice of the People' was a competition open to the public to co-present the People's Choice Award.) presented the People's Choice Award.

=== Performers ===
Performers at the ceremony:

- Dane Rumble, Stan Walker and J.Williams sang an 'Illegal mashup', a medley which included parts of "Choose You", "You Got Me", "Black Box", "Everything (Take Me Down)" and "Takes Me Higher".
- Pop singer Anika Moa sang "Running Through the Fire (Storm)", the lead single from her album, accompanied by Julia Deans.
- David Dallas performed his song "Til Tomorrow".
- "Buffalo" was given by indie rock band The Phoenix Foundation.
- Pop duo Kids of 88 played their award-winning single "Just a Little Bit".
- Gin Wigmore gave her number, "Oh My".
- 'Luger Boa and friends' sang a Shihad tribute.
