= New Zealand top 50 singles of 2009 =

This is a list of the top 50 singles in 2009 in New Zealand, as listed by the Recording Industry Association of New Zealand (RIANZ).

== Chart ==
Smashproof's "Brother" was the longest-running song in 2009, peaked at number one in eleven weeks in a row. The Black Eyed Peas's "I Gotta Feeling" and Keri Hilson's "Knock You Down" behind "Brother" for longest-running at number one, with 9 weeks and 6 weeks. Beyoncé's "Halo" was the longest-running in the chart this year, spent 33 weeks inside the chart. Black Eyed Peas' "I Gotta Feeling" and Smashproof's "Brother" tied in the second place, with 29 weeks and Taylor Swift's "Love Story" in the third place with 27 weeks.

Keyp
† – Song of New Zealand origin (Note: Whether or not a song is of New Zealand origin is determined by the RIANZ)

Rank	Artist	Title
1	The Black Eyed Peas	"I Gotta Feeling" from the album, The E.N.D.
2	Smashproof featuring Gin Wigmore	"Brother"† from the album, The Weekend
3	David Guetta featuring Akon	"Sexy Bitch" from the album, One Love
4	Ke$ha	"Tik Tok" from the album, Animal
5	The Black Eyed Peas	"Boom Boom Pow" from the album, The E.N.D.
6	Jason Mraz	"I'm Yours" from the album, We Sing, We Dance, We Steal Things
7	Flo Rida featuring Ke$ha	"Right Round" from the album, R.O.O.T.S.
8	Beyoncé Knowles	"Halo" from the album, I Am... Sasha Fierce
9	Beyoncé Knowles	"Sweet Dreams" from the album, I Am... Sasha Fierce
10	Keri Hilson featuring Kanye West & Ne-Yo	"Knock You Down" from the album, In a Perfect World...
11	Jason Derulo	"Whatcha Say" from the album, Jason Derulo
12	Jay Sean featuring Lil Wayne	"Down" from the album, All or Nothing
13	Taylor Swift	"Love Story"
14	Soulja Boy Tell 'Em featuring Sammie	"Kiss Me Thru the Phone" from the album, ISouljaBoyTellem
15	Lady Gaga	"Poker Face" from the album, The Fame
16	A R Rahman featuring The Pussycat Dolls	"Jai Ho" from the Slumdog Millionaire soundtrack
17	Miley Cyrus	"Party in the U.S.A." from the extended play, the Time Of Our Lives
18	Cobra Starship featuring Leighton Meester	"Good Girls Go Bad" from the album, Hot Mess
19	Stan Walker	"Black Box"† from the album, Introducing... Stan Walker
20	Pitbull	"I Know You Want Me (Calle Ocho)" from the album, Rebelution
21	T.I. featuring Justin Timberlake	"Dead and Gone" from the album, Paper Trail
22	Cascada featuring Carlprit	"Evacuate the Dancefloor" from the album, Evacuate the Dancefloor
23	Linkin Park	"New Divide" from the Transformers: Revenge of the Fallen soundtrack
24	J Williams	"Ghetto Flower"† from the album, Young Love
25	Taylor Swift	"You Belong with Me" from the album, Fearless
26	Owl City	"Fireflies" from the album, Ocean Eyes
27	Eminem	"We Made You" from the album, Relapse
28	The Black Eyed Peas	"Meet Me Halfway" from the album, The E.N.D.
29	Lady Gaga	"Bad Romance" from the album, The Fame Monster
30	Gin Wigmore	"Oh My"† from the album, Holy Smoke
31	Beyoncé Knowles	"Single Ladies (Put a Ring on It)" from the album, I Am... Sasha Fierce
32	Kids of 88	"My House"† from the album, Sugarpills
33	Jordin Sparks	"Battlefield" from the album, Battlefield
34	Savage featuring Baby Bash	"Wild Out (Chooo Hooo)"† from the album, Savage Island
35	Basshunter featuring DJ Mental Theo's Bazzheadz	"Now You're Gone" from the album, Now You're Gone – The Album
36	David Guetta featuring Kelly Rowland	"When Love Takes Over" from the albums, One Love & Here I Am
37	Tiki Taane	"Always on My Mind"† from the album, Past, Present, Future
38	Green Day	"21 Guns" from the album, 21st Century Breakdown
39	J Williams featuring Lavina Williams	"Stand with You"† from the album, Young Love
40	Eminem	"Beautiful" from the album, Relapse
41	Lady Gaga	"Paparazzi" from the album, The Fame
42	Ladyhawke	"My Delirium"† from the album, Ladyhawke
43	Miley Cyrus	"The Climb" from the Hannah Montana: The Movie soundtrack
44	Eric Hutchinson	"Rock & Roll" from the album, Sounds Like This
45	Nesian Mystik	"Mr Mista"† from the album, Elevator Musiq
46	Akon featuring Colby O'Donis & Kardinal Offishall	"Beautiful" from the album, Freedom
47	Kings of Leon	"Use Somebody" from the album, Only By The Night
48	Evermore	"Hey Boys & Girls (Truth of the World Part 2)"† from the album, Truth Of The World: Welcome To The Show
49	Midnight Youth	"All On Our Own"† from the album, The Brave Don't Run
50	Smashproof	"Ordinary Life"† from the album, The Weekend

== Top 20 singles of 2009 by New Zealand artists ==
Rank	Artist	Title
1	Smashproof featuring Gin Wigmore	"Brother"
2	Stan Walker	"Black Box"
3	J. Williams	"Ghetto Flower"
4	Gin Wigmore	"Oh My"
5	Kids of 88	"My House"
6	Savage featuring Baby Bash	"Wild Out (Chooo Hooo)"
7	Tiki Taane	"Always on My Mind"
8	J. Williams featuring Lavina Williams	"Stand with You"
9	Ladyhawke	"My Delirium"
10	Nesian Mystik	"Mr Mista"
11	Evermore	"Hey Boys & Girls (Truth of the World Part 2)"
12	Midnight Youth	"All On Our Own"
13	Smashproof	"Ordinary Life"

*Numbers 14 to 20 are currently unavailable
