= The Experiment (Dane Rumble album) =

Studio album by Dane Rumble
- Released: 29 March 2010
- Recorded: Beaver Studios; York Street Studio
- Genre: Pop rock
- Length: 40:53
- Labels: Rumble; Warner; Hussle
- Producers: Dane Rumble; Jonathan Campbell

Singles from The Experiment
- 1. "Always Be Here" Released: 16 February 2009; 2. "Don't Know What to Do" Released: 12 July 2009; 3. "Cruel" Released: 23 November 2009; 4. "Everything (Take Me Down)" Released: 12 April 2010; 5. "What Are You Waiting For?" Released: 30 August 2010

The Experiment is the only studio album by New Zealand singer-songwriter Dane Rumble. Released by Rumble Music and Warner Music on 29 March 2010, it follows two years after the split of his hip hop group Fast Crew. Rumble found it difficult to write music for himself, and therefore deviated to the pop rock genre. The Experiment includes elements of dance-pop and pop rap, and lyrically focusses on personal issues. Rumble produced the album with Jonathan Campbell. In July 2010 Rumble embarked on The Edge Winter Jam: The Experiment Tour, which had him perform in Auckland, Wellington and Christchurch.

The Experiment received mixed to positive reviews from music critics; some praised its catchiness while others labelled it "chart fodder". The record received nominations in four categories at the 2010 New Zealand Music Awards, and won the Rumble the award for Best Male Solo Artist. The Experiment debuted at number one on the New Zealand Albums Chart, and was certified gold by the Recording Industry Association of New Zealand (RIANZ). Five singles were released from the album: top-ten hits "Don't Know What to Do" and "Cruel", and "Always Be Here", "Everything (Take Me Down)" and "What Are You Waiting For?".

== Background ==
Rumble's hip hop group, Fast Crew, released their second studio album, Truth, Lies & Red Tape, in 2008. The band split soon afterwards, and Rumble decided to pursue a solo musical career, and taught himself to play the guitar. He began writing material for his album, but he found that he could no longer write hip hop. "Hip hop was just wearing really thin for me because it's really quite macho. 'I'm wicked because of this. I'm the best because of that'. It's a lot of talking yourself up," Rumble said. He began to write songs inspired by his own experiences and emotions, which allowed him to explore other musical genres. He explained that when he wrote songs for the album, he began by creating a chord progression using his guitar, which evolved into the tune's basic melody, after which he would determine its theme. Other songs were conceived by Rumble humming a tune during everyday activities, then recording it onto his iPhone so as to not forget it. The tune would later be refined to a full-fledged song. According to Rumble, writing music was the hardest component of the album's making. "Always Be Here" was the first song Rumble completed, which he sent to record label Warner Music NZ, thereby commencing his solo career.

Rumble organised a band of his friends, rather than the standard practice of contracting out to professional studio musicians. Scott Nicholls played drums, Ben White played guitar, Alistair Wood played keyboard instruments and Rumble's brother Josh played bass. White and Wood had previously played music with Fast Crew. The band spent three months recording the album's music; drums were recorded at York Street Studio, Auckland, while the remainder of the recording took place at Beaver Studios, Auckland. Rumble co-produced The Experiment with Jonathan Campbell, who also engineered the record. Rumble said he put a lot of time and effort into the album; "I really wanted to write a world class record, I didn't want to come out with some half-pie thing."

== Composition ==
"Cruel"
The album's third single features synth riffs, creating a dance-pop environment.

The Experiment is a pop rock album, featuring guitar and synth riffs, and incorporates elements of dance-pop, pop rap and power pop. Some parts of the album contain auto-tuned vocals, and the record has been described as having an "international" feel. Rumble said that this was because he and Campbell made sure that the album "sounded big [so that] it could compete on the world stage". Thematically, The Experiment is "about love, heartbreak, getting what he wants and knowing he is in charge of his own destiny", although "Let You Down" is "quite dark and weighty". Many of the song's discuss Rumble's own life experiences; some are reflective while others "just try to get other people enthused about what they're doing with their lives". "Always Be Here" discusses maintaining a romantic relationship while constantly travelling, and "What Are You Waiting For?" is "about being motivated and assessing your own life, which is exactly what happened to [Rumble]".

== Release and promotion ==
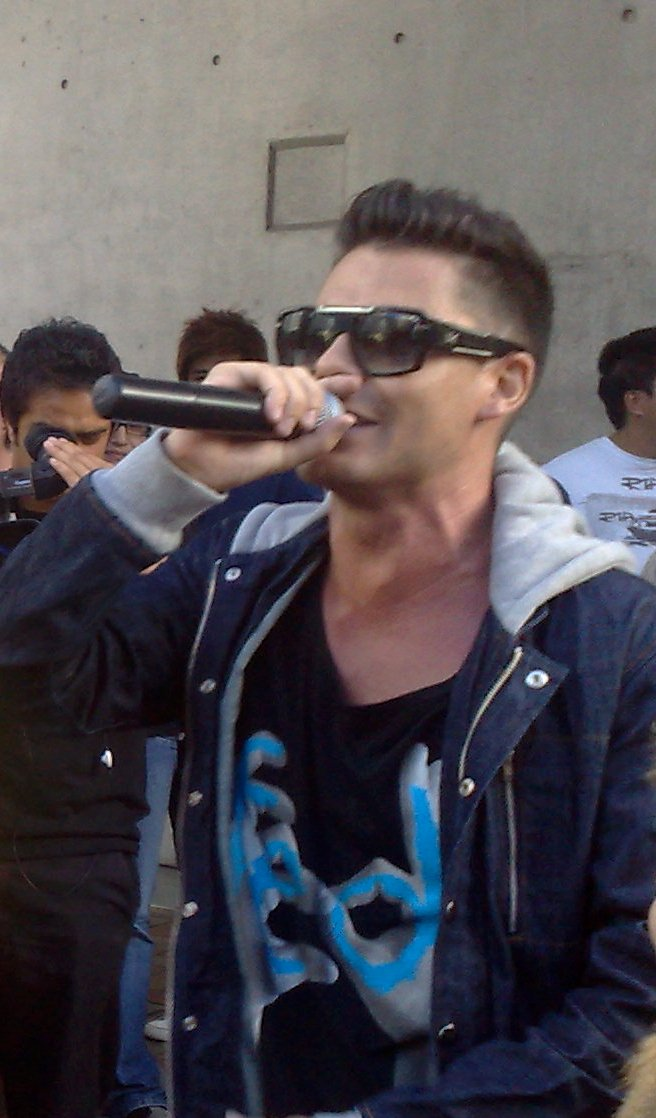
Rumble performing a free concert at the Sky Tower to promote the launch of The Experiment

On 26 March 2010, Rumble performed a free album launch concert at the Sky Tower in Auckland. The Experiment was released in New Zealand on 29 March 2010 by Rumble Music—Rumble's own record label—and Warner Music New Zealand. An Australian release followed on 1 April 2011, by Rumble Music and Hussle Recordings. Rumble embarked on The Edge Winter Jam: The Experiment Tour. Sponsored by radio station The Edge, it also featured appearances by J.Williams, Kidz in Space and Ivy Lies; it was later announced that American rapper B.o.B would join the line-up. The tour commenced on 15 July 2010 at Telstra Events Centre, Auckland. The second stop was at TSB Bank Arena, Wellington on 16 July, while the final show was on 17 July at Christchurch's Westpac Arena. The Wellington and Christchurch dates were rescheduled; the shows were originally booked for 8 and 9 July, respectively.

=== Singles ===
"Always Be Here" was released on 16 February 2009, becoming Rumble's debut solo single. It peaked at number thirteen on the New Zealand Singles Chart, and was certified gold by the RIANZ in December 2009. It also entered the ARIA Dance Chart at number nineteen. On 16 December 2009 "Don't Know What to Do" was released, which reached number ten on the New Zealand Singles Chart, and was also certified gold.

"Cruel" became the third single from The Experiment on 23 November 2009. A version of the song featuring a rapped interlude was released the same day, and is used in its music video. Reaching number three on the New Zealand Singles Chart and receiving a platinum certification from the RIANZ, "Cruel" became Rumble's most commercially successful single. Following the album's release "Everything (Take Me Down)" was released on 12 April 2010; it peaked at number twenty on the New Zealand Singles Chart. "What Are You Waiting For?" was released on 30 August 2010 as The Experiment's final single, but failed to chart.

== Reception ==
=== Critical reception ===
Professional ratings
Review scores
Source	Rating
Bay of Plenty Times	(favourable)
The Dominion Post	1/5 stars
The Nelson Mail	2.5/5 stars
The New Zealand Herald	4/5 stars
Rip It Up	4/5 stars
The Press	(favourable)

Jacqueline Smith of The New Zealand Herald gave The Experiment four out of five stars, and praised its mainstream appeal and the variation within the album. Rip It Up's Matt Ruys awarded The Experiment four out of five stars, calling it "arguably one of the best New Zealand male pop records of the new millenium". The Press' Vicki Anderson wrote, "This is one experiment that seems to have worked out for Dane Rumble". Kristin Macfarlane from the Bay of Plenty Times was very favourable in her review of the album, and lauded its catchy tunes. She noted that many radio-friendly songs become repetitive, however that does not apply to those on The Experiment. Conversely, The Nelson Mail's Nick Ward gave the album two-and-a-half stars, dismissing the radio-friendly nature of the album and describing it as "chart fodder". Simon Sweetman of The Dominion Post gave The Experiment one star out of five and wrote, "This [album] will be shoved down people's faces as being great new music from New Zealand and it's not. It's horrible."

The Experiment was nominated in four categories at the 2010 New Zealand Music Awards: Album of the Year, Breakthrough Artist of the Year, Best Male Solo Artist and Best Pop Album. It won the award for Best Male Solo Artist, while Gin Wigmore's Holy Smoke took out the other three categories.

=== Commercial performance ===
The Experiment debuted atop the New Zealand Albums Chart on 5 April 2010, replacing Lady Gaga's The Fame Monster. In its second charting week it slipped to number three, with Slash's self-titled album taking the number one spot, and was certified gold by the Recording Industry Association of New Zealand (RIANZ) on 11 April 2010, denoting shipments of 7,500 units. The album's last week in the chart was on 30 August 2010, having lasted twenty weeks on the top forty chart, including four in the top ten.

== Track listing ==
No.	Title	Writer(s)	Length
1.	"Always Be Here"	Dane Rumble	3:45
2.	"What Are You Waiting For?"	J. Little, Rumble	3:20
3.	"Just Don't Care"	Rumble	3:38
4.	"Live a Lie"	Rumble	3:16
5.	"Cruel" (non-rap version)	Samuel King, Te Awanui Reeder, Rumble	4:01
6.	"Gonna Be Mine"	Rumble	3:27
7.	"Don't Know What to Do"	Rumble	3:54
8.	"Everything (Take Me Down)"	Rumble	4:06
9.	"Breathe"	Rumble	3:20
10.	"Let You Down"	Rumble	4:09
11.	"One Last Time"	Rumble	3:57
Total length:			40:53

New Zealand iTunes Store bonus
No.	Title	Length
12.	"Cruel" (Kyle Bourke remix)	7:59

Australia iTunes Store bonus
No.	Title	Length
12.	"Cruel" (Silver Sneakerz vocal edit)	5:52

== Personnel ==
Credits for The Experiment, adapted from Allmusic:

- Laural Barrett – backing vocals
- Sharaine Barrett – backing vocals
- Barny Bewick – design, logo design
- Jonathan Campbell – accordion, additional production, drum engineering, engineering, mixing, production, programming, synthesiser
- Matt Coleman – management
- Joseph Faris – guitar
- Haylee Fisher – backing vocals
- Troy Goodall – photography
- Simon Gooding drum engineering, engineering
- Dave Goodison – guitar
- Simon Holloway – assistance, mastering
- Lawrence Katz – guitar
- Philip Kim – synthesiser
- Sam King – synthesiser
- Patrick Kuhtze – drums
- Steve Roberts – drum engineering, engineering
- Dane Rumble – logo design, production, synthesiser, vocals
- Michael Tahafe – drums, guitar
- Hayden Taylor – engineering
- Ben White – guitar
- Alister Wood – synthesiser
- Vitaly Zolotarev – mixing

== See also ==
- List of number-one albums in 2010 (New Zealand)
