= Illegal Musik =

- Parent company: Warner Music New Zealand
- Genre: Hip-hop, R&B
- Location: New Zealand
- Official website: www.illegalmusik.co.nz

Illegal Musik is a New Zealand lifestyle company with a primary focus on music and entertainment. Its success started via its development of R&B singer J.Williams and has grown to include a wide range of artists from various genres. It currently has a partnership with Warner Music. Illegal Musik's record label headquarters and music albums are based in New Zealand.

== Company history ==
Illegal Musik was founded by CEO Mark Arona and business partner Eddie Bennet in 2007. Their first two signings, J.Williams and Erakah, received Best Male and Best Female Artist Awards, at the 2010 Pacific Island Music Awards.

The label's production house is managed by Inoke Finau "N.O.X" (lead guitarist of Rock Band Junipah).

Through a partnership with New Zealand company 3D Live and Director Damien Caine, Illegal Musik produced the first all LIVE 3D Music Video for artist J.Williams 'You Got Me'. They received an award for innovation in New Zealand Music in 2010. The single also received 'Best Hip-Hop Video' at the Juice TV Awards (May 2010).

The label has also signed a partnership with Warner Australia and have released three singles from J.Williams 'You Got Me' (2010), 'Take Me Higher (Illegal Remix)' (2011), and 'Live It Up' (2011).

== Notable artists ==
Illegal Musik has signed artists from different genres.

- DJCXL - member of Ill Semantics
- Erakah - R&B singer, best known for her collaboration with J.Williams on the single, "Your Style"
- Vince Harder - R&B singer, best known for his collaboration with P-Money
- J.Williams - R&B singer, who had a No.1 single, "You Got Me"
- K.One - rapper
- Tyson Tyler - rapper
- Brooke Duff - pop singer, best known for her single "Till The End"
- Junipah - rock band
- Erin Simpson - TV presenter

== Previous artists ==
- Titanium (Pop boy band, best known for their number one single, Come On Home.)

== Discography ==
=== Albums ===
!Year of Release	Title	Artist	Charted	Certification
Albums
2006	"Good Music"	Ill Semantics	—18	—
2009	"Young Love"	J.Williams	6	Gold

=== Singles ===
Year of Release	Title	Artist	Charted	Certification
Singles
2008	"Blow Your Mind"	J.Williams	13	—
2008	"Set It Off"	J.Williams	36	—
2009	"Ghetto Flower"	J.Williams	5	Platinum
2009	"Infatuated"	Erakah	—	—
2009	"Stand With You"	J.Williams (featuring Lavina Williams)	6	Gold
2009	"Wonderful"	Erakah	—	—
2009	"Your Style"	J.Williams (featuring Erakah)	16	—
2010	"My Love"	DJCXL (featuring The Gift and J.Williams)	—	—
2010	"You Got Me"	J.Williams (featuring Scribe)	1	2× Platinum
2010	"Say This With Me"	Vince Harder	39	—
2010	"Takes Me Higher"	J.Williams (featuring Dane Rumble)	2	Platinum
2010	"Day and Night"	Erakah (featuring JR)	—	—
2010	"Never"	K.One (featuring Junipah)	—	—
2010	"Alone No More"	Vince Harder (featuring K.One)	—	—
2010	"Natural"	DJCXL (featuring Erakah and K.One)	—	—
2010	"Night of Your Life"	J.Williams (featuring K.One)	4	Gold
2010	"Walking Away"	K.One (featuring Jason Kerrison)	38	—
2010	"In or Out"	Erakah (featuring K.One)	—	—
2010	"Summer Dayz"	Vince Harder (featuring Young Sid)	—	—
2010	"I Like It"	Illegal Banditz (featuring Brooke Fowler and K.One)	—	—
2011	"I Want This Forever"	Vince Harder	—	—
2012	"Come On Home"	Titanium	1	2× Platinum

== See also ==
- List of record labels: I–Q
