= Always Be Here =

Single by Dane Rumble

from the album The Experiment
- Released: 16 February 2009
- Genre: Pop rock; synth rock
- Length: 3:45
- Label: Hussle; Rumble; Universal
- Songwriter: Dane Rumble
- Producer: Jonathan Campbell

Dane Rumble singles chronology
"Always Be Here" (2009)	"Don't Know What to Do" (2009)

"Always Be Here" is a song by New Zealand singer-songwriter Dane Rumble. It was released by Rumble Music on 16 February 2009 as the first single from his debut solo studio album, The Experiment (2010). "Always Be Here" was the first song that Rumble wrote for The Experiment that he liked. A pop rock and synth rock song, it discusses the dilemma of balancing a busy work schedule and a romantic relationship.

"Always Be Here" was noted by The Dominion Post's Simon Sweetman as the best track from The Experiment, and it reached number thirteen on the New Zealand Singles Chart and was certified gold by the Recording Industry Association of New Zealand (RIANZ). It also reached number ninety-four on the Australian Singles Chart. A music video was filmed for "Always Be Here" and was directed by Ivan Slavov; it shows Rumble's girlfriend leaving him after his career means he spends little time with her.

== Background and composition ==
"Always Be Here"
A sample of the song, illustrating its guitar-founded pop rock and synth rock melody

After his hip hop band Fastcrew split, Rumble decided to explore other genres for his debut solo album The Experiment. "Always Be Here" was described by Rumble as "the first song I finished [writing for The Experiment] that I liked". Rumble sent a demo to New Zealand On Air, who awarded him a grant for new recording artists. The demo was developed by record producer Jonathan Campbell before release. The track was released digitally by Rumble Music on 16 February 2009 in New Zealand. In Australia, "Always Be Here" was sent to classic rock and contemporary hit radio by Hussle Recordings and Universal Music Australia on 26 July 2010, and was released as a digital download by Hussle Recordings and Rumble Music on 27 August 2010. The song was released internationally by Rumble Music on 20 June 2011 as a digital download.

"Always Be Here" is a guitar-based pop rock and synth rock song, and contains hip hop influences. Simon Sweetman from The Dominion Post noted that the song's riff is similar to that of "Jessie's Girl" by Rick Springfield. Lyrically, "Always Be Here" is about "the balancing act of life on the road with a long-term relationship".

== Reception ==
The Dominion Post's Simon Sweetman heavily criticised songs on The Experiment for all sounding similar, but picked "Always Be Here" as a distinct tune. "Always Be Here" debuted on the New Zealand Singles Chart at number thirty-three on the chart of 2 March 2009. On 20 April, it peaked at number thirteen. "Always Be Here" spent twenty-one weeks on the chart, and exited in July 2009. On 20 December 2009 the song was certified gold by the Recording Industry Association of New Zealand (RIANZ). "Always Be Here" entered the Australian Singles Chart at number ninety-four on 6 September 2010, and fell off the chart the following week. "Always Be Here" spent four weeks on the Australian Hitseekers Chart in September 2010, and peaked at number four.

== Music video ==
The accompanying music video for "Always Be Here" was directed by Ivan Slavov. It begins with Rumble driving along a motorway while speaking on his cellular telephone; his girlfriend is seen at home alone as the telephone conversation ends. Looking depressed, she picks at her meal before falling asleep. Rumble returns home and talks to his girlfriend, who does not reply. The next day she packs her belongings and leaves; when Rumble returns in the afternoon to find his girlfriend gone he reminisces on their relationship with flashbacks. Throughout the video scenes of Rumble and a backing band playing the song in front of brightly lit backdrops are intercut, along with a contemplative Rumble wearing a blue singlet. The "Always Be Here" video was the fourth most-watched New Zealand music video on YouTube in 2009.

== Track listing ==
Australian digital download

1. "Always Be Here" – 3:45
2. "Always Be Here" (Luke B Remix) – 4:51

Other digital download

1. "Always Be Here" – 3:45

== Charts and certifications ==
Chart (2009–10)	Peak position
Australian Singles Chart	94
Australian Hitseekers Chart	4
New Zealand Singles Chart	13

Country	Certification
New Zealand	Gold

== Release history ==
Country	Date	Format	Label
New Zealand	16 February 2010	Digital download	Rumble
Australia	26 July 2010	Classic rock	Hussle; Universal
Australia	26 July 2010	Contemporary hit radio	Hussle; Universal
Australia	27 August 2010	Digital download	Hussle; Rumble
Austria	20 June 2011	Digital download	Rumble
Belgium	20 June 2011	Digital download	Rumble
Brazil	20 June 2011	Digital download	Rumble
Colombia	20 June 2011	Digital download	Rumble
Denmark	20 June 2011	Digital download	Rumble
Finland	20 June 2011	Digital download	Rumble
Germany	20 June 2011	Digital download	Rumble
Hong Kong	20 June 2011	Digital download	Rumble
Honduras	20 June 2011	Digital download	Rumble
Israel	20 June 2011	Digital download	Rumble
Italy	20 June 2011	Digital download	Rumble
Luxembourg	20 June 2011	Digital download	Rumble
Malaysia	20 June 2011	Digital download	Rumble
Mauritius	20 June 2011	Digital download	Rumble
Mexico	20 June 2011	Digital download	Rumble
Netherlands	20 June 2011	Digital download	Rumble
Norway	20 June 2011	Digital download	Rumble
Poland	20 June 2011	Digital download	Rumble
Portugal	20 June 2011	Digital download	Rumble
Russia	20 June 2011	Digital download	Rumble
Singapore	20 June 2011	Digital download	Rumble
Sweden	20 June 2011	Digital download	Rumble
Switzerland	20 June 2011	Digital download	Rumble
Taiwan	20 June 2011	Digital download	Rumble
Thailand	20 June 2011	Digital download	Rumble
Turkey	20 June 2011	Digital download	Rumble
United Kingdom	20 June 2011	Digital download	Rumble
United States	20 June 2011	Digital download	Rumble
