= Brooke Duff =

New Zealand recording artist and songwriter

- Born: 27 November 1991 (age 34); Christchurch, New Zealand
- Origin: Auckland, New Zealand
- Genre: Pop
- Occupation: Singer-songwriter
- Instrument: Vocals
- Years active: 2009–present
- Labels: Illegal Musik, Warner Music Group

Brooke Duff (born 27 November 1991) is a New Zealand recording artist and songwriter. She was discovered by Illegal Musik, who eventually signed her to the record label, along with its counterpart Warner Music Group. Duff released her debut single, "Till the End" in July 2012. The single reached number nine on the New Zealand Singles Chart.

== Early life and career ==
Brooke Duff was born in Christchurch, New Zealand in 1991. Duff has been singing since the age of ten through her Church, but she moved to Australia for her career. She was recognised while she was singing at Melbourne's Beaumaris Theatre with a school production, and was the lead role in 'Patsi' and the role of Wendy in 'Peter Pan'. At the same time, she was selected as one of 50 youth singers from around Australia to form the Australian Youth Choir in 2003. According to sources, she is Christian. She was brought to the attention of Illegal via mutual friends in late 2009 and Head of A&R, Mark Arona, opted for a long-term strategic approach to her career development. She had attended Riccarton High School in Christchurch.

=== 2011–present: Musical career and Till the End ===
Around early 2010, she has been working with the Illegal Musik team building her music catalogue and industry experience. She has been fortunate to feature and collaborate on tracks with the Illegal Banditz and K.One. Then in 2011, she moved to Auckland due to the 2011 Christchurch earthquake, which caused devastation in the city. She performed at the "Band Together" concert to help fundraising the earthquake, with a total of 140,000 Cantabarians attending, becoming her biggest performance to date. Duff was featured on K.One's single "Bring That Beat Back", which ultimately peaked at one on the New Zealand iTunes Hip Hop Charts.

In 2012, Duff released her first single entitled "Till the End" on 13 July 2012. The song was produced by Vince Harder and NOX, both originating from the Illegal Musik production house. The song debuted at number nine on the New Zealand Singles Chart (which features singles from New Zealand artists), becoming Duff's first top ten single. The song rose to number two, and had officially charted on the New Zealand Singles Chart at number twenty-seven.

Brooke discussed the concept of "Till the End":

Till The End is about the journey of moving up to Auckland to follow my dreams, and having that special person who stuck by me not matter what – and even followed me up so I can do what I love.

A fan had asked Duff if an accompanying music video will be produced for the single, which she replied; "Yes! We've already shot it, just waiting to release it! Keep an eye out! :) can't wait to show you all! #excited". In an interview with The Edge, she was asked if she was in production with an upcoming studio album, which she replied; "You'll have to wait and see....". It was officially confirmed by RIANZ that she would be releasing an album at the end of 2012.

== Influences and musical style ==
While interviewed with Glassons Blog, she was asked what music inspires her and she said "I guess when you're making pop music you tend to listen to other pop artists, Katy Perry, Rihanna, Taylor Swift, Beyoncé, Jessie J. But I also love artists like Emeli Sande, Frank Ocean, Jazmine Sullivan [...] I go through music fads where I will only listen to a particular artist, at the moment it's Kimbra (another fellow NZ musician)."

In trends and fashion, she responded that she is a huge fan of Jeffery Campbell for his "shoes". She also said "You seriously feel like you could conquer anything in them [BlackMilk Collections] they're super shiny, nice and stretchy and they always get comments." She cites Blake Lively and The Olsen Twins as fashion influences.

== Discography ==
=== Extended plays ===
Album	Album details	Peak Positions		Certifications (sales thresholds)
Album	Album details	NZ	NZ Artist	Certifications (sales thresholds)
Kaleidoscope	Released: 29 November 2013; Label: Illegal Musik; Format: Digital download	25	6	–

=== Singles ===
==== As lead artist ====
Year	Single	Peak Positions		Album	Certifications (sales thresholds)
Year	Single	NZ	NZ Artist	Album	Certifications (sales thresholds)
2012	"Till the End"	23	2	Kaleidoscope	–
2012	"Say To You"	–	10	Kaleidoscope	–
2013	"The Real You" (feat. K.One)	–	14	Kaleidoscope	–
2013	"Something New"	–	20	Kaleidoscope	–

==== As featured artist ====
Year	Single	Album
2011	"Bring That Beat Back" (K.One featuring Brooke Duff)	—N/a
2013	"SameYou" (K.One featuring Brooke Duff)	—N/a

== Tours ==
- Come on Home Tour (2012)
