= Night of Your Life =

Night of Your Life may refer to:

- Night of Your Life (J. Williams song), 2010
- Night of Your Life (David Guetta song), 2011
