= Don't Know What to Do (disambiguation) =

"Don't Know What to Do" is a 2019 song by Blackpink.

Don't Know What to Do may also refer to:

- "Don't Know What to Do" (Dane Rumble song), 2009
- "Don't Know What to Do", a song by Betty Boo from Boomania, 1990
- "Don't Know What to Do (Don't Know What to Say)", a song by Ric Segreto, 1982
