= Till the End =

Till the End may refer to:

- "Till the End", song by Toto from Fahrenheit
- Till the End (Brooke Duff song)
- Till the End (Vern Gosdin song)
- Till the End (album), a 2015 album and title track by Phinehas
- Till the End (TV series), a 2023 Singaporean television series
- "Til the End", a 2004 song by Lloyd Banks from The Hunger for More
- "Til the End", a 2010 song by Tinchy Stryder from Third Strike
- "'Til the End", a 2015 song by Jeremy Camp from I Will Follow

== See also ==
- Until the End (disambiguation)
