= I Got =

2004 single by Fast Crew

Single by Fast Crew

from the album Set the Record Straight
- B-side: "Suburbia Streets"
- Released: May 2004
- Genre: New Zealand hip hop
- Length: 3:54
- Label: King Music
- Songwriters: Jon Thorne; Dane Rumble; Diablo Deville; Jeremy Kent-Johnston; Rebekah Benner
- Producer: Jerome Fortune

Fast Crew singles chronology
"Mr Radio" (2002)	"I Got" (2004)	"It's the Incredible" (2004)

Music video
- "I Got" on YouTube

"I Got" is a song by New Zealand hip hop group Fast Crew, released in May 2004 as the first single from their debut album, Set the Record Straight (2004). It propelled the group to stardom in New Zealand, peaking at number four on the New Zealand Singles Chart and spending 23 weeks in the top 50. In 2005, the song charted in Australia, where it reached number 22 on the ARIA Singles Chart.

== Release and reception ==
Following performances at major music festivals such as the Big Day Out and rallying support from the underground hip hop community, Fast Crew began to achieve mainstream success in 2002 following the release of their debut single, "Mr Radio", and "I Got" was released in May 2004 as the first single from their 2004 album, Set the Record Straight. "I Got" debuted at number 26 on the New Zealand Singles Chart on 31 May 2004 and slowly rose up the chart, peaking at number four for two weeks in July and August. Their newfound success earned ovations from audiences as they supported several international musical acts, including Missy Elliott and Busta Rhymes. The single was eventually certified gold by the Recording Industry Association of New Zealand (now Recorded Music NZ) for selling over 5,000 copies. It was New Zealand's 17th best-selling single of 2004.

On 16 May 2005, the song was released in Australia. On 29 May, it debuted and peaked at number 22 on the ARIA Singles Chart, then spent the next eight weeks descending the listing, making a re-appearance at number 49 on 14 August 2005. The Elite Fleet remix of "I Got" found popularity at Australian clubs, peaking at number four on the ARIA Club Tracks chart and finishing 2005 as the 36th-most-successful club hit.

== Track listings ==
New Zealand CD single

1. "I Got" – 3:54
2. "I Got" (instrumental) – 3:54
3. "Suburbia Streets" (radio edit) – 4:24
4. "Suburbia Streets" (instrumental) – 4:24
5. "I Got" (video)

Australian CD single

1. "I Got" – 3:54
2. "Whoa There I Go Again" – 3:56
3. "Make the World Spin" – 4:56
4. "I Got" (Bump City remix) – 3:30
5. "I Got" (Elite Fleet remix) – 3:53
6. "I Got" (The Magic Number remix) – 3:49
7. "I Got" (video)

== Charts ==
=== Weekly charts ===
Chart (2004–2005)	Peak position
Australia (ARIA)	22
Australian Club Chart (ARIA)	4
Australian Urban (ARIA)	13
New Zealand (Recorded Music NZ)	4

=== Year-end charts ===
Chart (2004)	Position
New Zealand (RIANZ)	17

Chart (2005)	Position
Australian Club Chart (ARIA)	36

== Certifications ==
Region	Certification	Certified units/sales
New Zealand (RMNZ)	Gold	5,000^{*}
^{*} Sales figures based on certification alone.

== Release history ==
Region	Date	Format	Label	Ref.
New Zealand	May 2004	CD	King Music	
Australia	16 May 2005	CD	Warner Music Australia	
