= Walking Away (K.One song) =

Single by K.One featuring Jason Kerrison
- Released: 8 November 2010
- Length: 3:39
- Label: Illegal Musik
- Songwriter(s): B Husband, J Kerrison, K Vitale & I Finau

K.One singles chronology
"Natural" (2010)	"Walking Away" (2010)	"Night of Your Life" (2010)

"Walking Away" is a single by New Zealand rapper K.One. It features Jason Kerrison from Opshop.

== Music video ==
The music video for "Walking Away" was directed by Anthony Plant and shows K.One and Jason Kerrison walking. K.One going forwards and Kerrison backwards. The pair pass each other and by the end of the music video they are where the other one started.

== Chart performance ==
Walking Away debuted on the RIANZ charts at number 38.
