= You Got Me (J. Williams song) =

Single by J. Williams featuring Scribe

from the album Young Love (Collectors Edition)
- Released: 8 February 2010
- Genre: R&B
- Length: 3:45
- Label: IllegalMusik; Warner
- Songwriters: J.Williams, Scribe, Inoke Finau

J. Williams singles chronology
"Your Style" (2009)	"You Got Me" (2010)	"Takes Me Higher" (2010)

Scribe singles chronology
"F.R.E.S.H." (2007)	"You Got Me" (2010)	"Fresh Boyz" (2010)

Australian and Japanese cover

"You Got Me" is a single by New Zealand R&B singer J. Williams featuring Scribe, released in February 2010. Young Love (Collectors Edition) features the track. The single went to number one in New Zealand five weeks after its debut, and was certified gold the week after.

== Release ==
"You Got Me" was written by Williams, Scribe and Inoke Finau. Williams has said that he wrote the song for his former girlfriend, Larissa Brown. It was released by Illegal Musik in New Zealand on 8 February 2010, and in Japan on 27 June 2012, and by Warner Music Australia in Australia on 16 July 2010.

== Reception ==
"You Got Me"
Williams singing the chorus, followed by the beginning of Scribe's verse

At the 2010 New Zealand Music Awards, "You Got Me" was nominated for Single of the Year, but lost to "Just a Little Bit" by Kids of 88.

"You Got Me" entered the New Zealand Singles Chart at number twelve on 15 February 2010. On 15 March 2010 it reached number one, where it spent four consecutive weeks. On 21 March 2010 the song was certified gold by the Recording Industry Association of New Zealand for having sold 7,500 copies. "You Got Me" exited the singles chart in July, having lasted a total of 22 weeks. It has since been certified double platinum, denoting 30,000 sales. The song was placed at number one on the year-end singles chart. "You Got Me" also topped the NZ radio airplay chart on 17 and 24 May 2010. In May 2011 it won the Radio Airplay Award at the Pacific Music Awards.

== Music video ==
The music video was directed by Damien Caine, who was also executive producer and chief editor. A 3-D version of the music video was released. Most of the video is taken up by Williams dancing in a room of billiard tables, at first with backup dancers, then later with Scribe. At the 2010 Juice TV Awards, "You Got Me" won Best Hip Hop Video and the Innovation Award.

== See also ==
- List of number-one singles in 2010 (New Zealand)
- List of number-one radio airplays in 2010 (New Zealand)
