= Erakah =

New Zealand R&B and soul singer

- Genres: R&B, soul
- Label: Illegal Musik

Erakah is a New Zealand R&B and soul singer. In 2009, she featured on R&B singer J.Williams single "Your Style" of his album Young Love. Inspired by Soul music Erakah states Alicia Keys, Lily Allen, Beyoncé and Brandy as influences on her musical style. She released her debut album, Infatuated, on 21 March 2011. Erakah is now a regular backup singer for Stan Walker. In 2011, she performed at Mika's Aroha Mardi Gras TV Special.

== Discography ==
=== Studio albums ===
Year	Album details
2011	Infatuated: Released: 21 March 2011; Label: Illegal Musik; Formats: CD, digital download

=== Singles ===
Year	Title	Album
2009	"Infatuated" (featuring Temple Jones)	Infatuated
2009	"Wonderful"	Infatuated
2010	"Day & Night" (featuring JR)	Infatuated
2010	"In Or Out" (featuring K.One)	Infatuated
2011	"Hold You Near"	Infatuated

==== Featured singles ====
Year	Title	NZ chart	Album
2009	"Your Style" (J.Williams featuring Erakah)	16	Young Love
2010	"Natural" (DJ CXL featuring Erakah and K.One)	—	non-album single

=== Music videos ===
Year	Title	Director
2009	"Infatuated"	Ivan Slavov
2009	"Wonderful"	Ivan Slavov
2010	"Day & Night"	Liam Williams

== Awards and nominations ==
Pacific Music Awards

Year	Nominee / work	Award	Result
2010	"Wonderful"	Best Pacific Female Artist	Won
