= Takes Me Higher =

Single by J. Williams featuring Dane Rumble
- Released: 25 May 2010
- Genre: Hip-hop, R&B, electropop
- Length: 3:51
- Label: Illegal Musik/Warner
- Songwriter(s): I. Finau, D. Rumble, J. Williams

J. Williams singles chronology
"You Got Me" (2010)	"Takes Me Higher" (2010)	"Night of Your Life" (2010)

Dane Rumble singles chronology
"Everything (Take Me Down)" (2010)	"Takes Me Higher" (2010)	"What Are You Waiting For?" (2010)

Audio sample
- file; help

"Takes Me Higher" is a single by New Zealand R&B and hip-hop singer J. Williams, released in May 2010. It features pop singer Dane Rumble.

== Writing and release ==
"Takes Me Higher" was co-written by Williams, Rumble and I. Finau. The single was released as a digital download at the iTunes Store and Digirama on 25 May 2010.

Takes Me Higher is Dane Rumble's 4th consecutive No.1 on the NZ40 Airplay chart. The last time an artist had 4 no.1 singles on this chart was Brooke Fraser back in 2005.

== Composition ==
"Takes Me Higher" is a R&B and pop ballad. It contains small amounts of auto-tune. Williams sings the chorus and the first verse, while Rumble sings the second verse. Both singers share the final verse.

== Music video ==
The music video premiered on 28 June 2010 on Select Live.

== Chart performance and certification ==
Chart (2010)	Peak position
Germany (GfK)	75
New Zealand (Recorded Music NZ)	2

== Titanium version ==
Titanium covered "Takes Me Higher" and included it as the B-side to their first single, "Come On Home".
