= Your Style =

Single by J. Williams featuring Erakah

from the album Young Love
- Released: 9 November 2009
- Genre: R&B
- Length: 3:28; 3:51 (remix)
- Label: IllegalMusik/Warner
- Songwriters: J Williams, I Finau, K Bennison

J. Williams singles chronology
"Stand with You" (2009)	"Your Style" (2009)	"You Got Me" (2010)

Erakah singles chronology
""Wonderful"" (2009)	""Your Style"" (2009)	""Day & Night"" (2010)

"Your Style" is the fifth single from J. Williams' debut album, Young Love. The song features Erakah. The official remix also features Tyree., and is on the Collector's Edition of Williams' album.

== Music video ==
The music video uses the remixed track, featuring both Erakah and Tyree. It was released on 14 December 2009.

== Chart performance ==
Chart (2009)	Peak position
New Zealand Singles Chart	16
