= Alice by the Moon =

Studio album by The Checks
- Released: June 8, 2009 (New Zealand)
- Genres: Blues, rock
- Length: 50:09
- Label: Pie Club Records

The Checks chronology
Hunting Whales (2007)	Alice by the Moon (2009)

Alice by the Moon is the second full-length studio release from The Checks and the first released on their own label.

== Background ==
The album was recorded by the band in February and March 2009 at The Lab Studios in Auckland. It was released on June 8, 2009, in New Zealand and went to number 13 on the NZ Top 40 Album Charts. The first single You and Me was released to radio airplay late in March, and a video followed in May. Alice by the Moon was followed with a string of sell-out shows over New Zealand, and also led to the band gaining major slots at both the Rhythm & Vines Festival on New Year's Eve 2009 and at the Auckland leg of the Big Day Out. The album was met with very positive reviews with one review calling it "Intoxicating, raucous and beautifully distorted". The album was one of the five shortlisted for the inaugural Taite Music Prize in 2010.

== Track listing ==
1. "Bagheera"
2. "You and Me"
3. "Crows"
4. "Ballroom Baby"
5. "Back of the Restaurant"
6. "Any Man Here Will Run You In"
7. "God Birds"
8. "Till The Dance Is Over"
9. "Isabella"
10. "Get Off The Stage Man"
11. "Let Your Lover Know"
12. "Wait In The Summer"
13. "Hold My Head"

Tracks 1, 6, 7, 8, 9, 10, and 13 by Sven Petterson and Edward Knowles. Tracks 2 and 12 by Callum Martin and Sven Petterson. Tracks 3, 4, and 11 by Callum Martin, Sven Petterson and Edward Knowles. Tim Bern and Haddon Smith feature on Tracks 1, 5 and 12. Hannah Curwood features on Tracks 8 and 13.
