= Wonderful (Erakah song) =

Single by Erakah
- Released: 21 September 2009
- Genre: Pop music, R&B
- Length: 4:02
- Label: Illegal Musik/Warner
- Songwriter(s): I Finau, K Bennison, D Love
- Producer(s): DLOVE, NOX

Erakah singles chronology
"Infatuated" (2009)	"Wonderful" (2009)	"Your Style" (2009)

"Wonderful" is the second single by New Zealand pop and R&B singer Erakah. It was released by Illegal Musik on 21 September 2009.

Erakah won the Best Pacific Female Artist award at the 2010 Pacific Music Awards for "Wonderful".

== Music video ==
The music video for "Wonderful" was directed by Ivan Slavov. It shows Erakah reminiscing about her failed romance, before she and her boyfriend got back together.
