= Ghetto Flower =

Single by J. Williams

from the album Young Love
- Released: 16 March 2009
- Genre: R&B
- Length: 3:52
- Label: IllegalMusik/Warner
- Songwriter(s): L Williams, J Williams, I Finau

J. Williams singles chronology
| "Set It Off" (2008) | "Ghetto Flower" (2009) | "Stand With You" (2009) |

"Ghetto Flower" is the third single from J. Williams' debut studio album, Young Love written by his sister, Lavina Williams, known as a member of New Zealand 90s girl band, MaVelle. The single was released on 16 March 2009.

== Chart performance ==
The single entered the New Zealand Singles Chart of 30 March 2009 at 28th position, and peaked at 6th position for 3 non-consecutive weeks in April and May 2009.

| Chart (2009) | Peak position |
|---|---|
| New Zealand Singles Chart | 5 |

=== Year-end charts ===
| Chart (2009) | Ranking |
|---|---|
| New Zealand Singles Chart | 24 |
