= Blow Your Mind (J. Williams song) =

Single by J. Williams

from the album Young Love
- Released: 11 August 2008
- Genre: Hip hop, rap, R&B
- Length: 3:41
- Label: IllegalMusik/Warner
- Songwriter(s): J Williams, I Finau

J. Williams singles chronology
"Blow Your Mind" (2008)	"Set It Off" (2008)

"Blow Your Mind" is the debut single from New Zealand R&B singer J. Williams. It features on his debut album, Young Love. It was released digitally on 11 August 2008. The single debuted on the RIANZ singles chart on 15 September 2008 at number 19. It later peaked at number 13.
