= Until the End =

Until the End may refer to:

- Until the End (Kittie album), or the title song
- Until the End (Eleine album)
- Until the End (Coldrain EP)
- "Until the End" (Breaking Benjamin song)
- "Until the End" (Norah Jones song)
- "Until the End", a song by All Shall Perish on the album Awaken the Dreamers
- "Until the End", a song by Asking Alexandria on the album From Death to Destiny
- "Until the End", a song by Avenged Sevenfold on the album Live in the LBC & Diamonds in the Rough
- "Until the End", a song by Frozen Crown on the album Call of the North
- "Until the End", a song by Heavenly on the album Sign of the Winner
- "Until the End", a song by Hypocrisy from Hypocrisy
- "Until the End", a song by Limp Bizkit, a non-album track from Results May Vary
- "Until the End", a song by Myrath from Wilderness of Mirrors
- "Until the End", a song by The Nightwatchman from Axis of Justice: Concert Series Volume 1
- "Until the End", a song by Xandria from Sacrificium

== See also ==
- Til the End (disambiguation)
