= Till the End (Brooke Duff song) =

"Till The End"

Single by Brooke Duff

from the album Kaleidoscope
- B-side: "Featuring K.One [Remix]"
- Released: 13 July 2012
- Recorded: 2012
- Genre: Pop rock, dance-pop
- Length: 3:40
- Label: Illegal Musik, Warner Music
- Songwriters: Brooke Duff, I Finau, Vince Harder
- Producers: NOX, Vince Harder

Brooke Duff singles chronology
"'Bring That Beat Back'" (2011)	"Till The End" (2012)

"Till The End" is a song by New Zealand recording artist and songwriter Brooke Duff, which is expected to be due off her upcoming solo work. The production of the song was handled by NOX and Vince Harder, both New Zealand known musicians. Musically, the song is a pop-oriented song while the lyrical content talks about Duff leaving her hometown with her lover. The song was released on 13 July 2012 along with its remix and has so-far received positive reviews from music critics. The song peaked at number nine on the New Zealand Singles Chart. The accompanying music video was released on 20 August 2012.

== Background and composition ==
Till The End is about the journey of moving up to Auckland to follow my dreams, and having that special person who stuck by me not matter what - and even followed me up so I can do what I love.

—The story behind "Til The End"

Before being known as a solo singer, Duff performed live throughout New Zealand as well as feature in the group Illegal Banditz and on the track ‘Bring That Beat Back’ with K.One, who is also a featuring artist to the remix. She was brought to the attention of the record label Illegal Musik, via mutual friends in late 2009 and Head of A&R, Mark Arona, opted for a long-term strategic approach to her career development. Before starting production of "Til The End", in the last 18 months she has been working with the Illegal Musik team building her music catalogue and industry experience, so she started collaborating with K.One and Illegal Banditz to build her career experience.

When Duff moved away from Christchurch, due to the after effects of the 2011 Christchurch earthquake, she recorded the song in Auckland in the Illegal Musik Studios. Musically, the song is a dance-pop inspired song. The song was written by Duff, while production was handled by Illegal Musik's production house members NOX and Vince Harder, who is also a musician. Lyrically, the song is about her departure from her hometown of Christchurch after the earthquakes and her journey to make a life for herself & her partner in a new city. According to Illegal Musik, they wanted to "catapult the song into the stratosphere." Her first fan cover was also released as well.

== Reception and promotion ==
"Til The End" was released digitally via iTunes on 13 July 2012. An additional remix, which features Illegal Musik member K.One was released on iTunes the same day. Additionally, "Til The End" received positive reviews from New Zealand music critics. ZM Radio premiered the song on 11 July 2012, and called the song "HUGE". Creme Magazine had said the song featured "Bursting beats". ClassicHits.co.nz said the song isn't a "overnight pop sensation".

Currently, "Til The End" is New Zealand's highest played song on New Zealand radio stations. Her parent record label, Warner Music Group had announced that the first 100 people who deem there voucher code to the NZ magazine Creme, they will receive a free digital download of it.

== Chart performance ==
"Til The End" debuted at number nine on the New Zealand NZ Singles Chart on the issue date of 23 July 2012. The song stayed there for two consecutive weeks, becoming Duff's first top ten single, but fell out after its second week. The song re-entered at number twelve on the issue date of 13 August 2012, and fell to fourteen the next week. The song is currently peaking at number two on the NZ Singles Chart.

After the music video had broadcast, sales for the single had increased to peak inside the top fifty on iTunes. It then rose to number five in its sixth week. The song debuted at number twenty-seven on the Official New Zealand Singles Chart. The song was placed at 16th as the Top Selling NZ Singles of 2012, by the Recording Industry Association of New Zealand.

== Music video ==
In an interview with The Edge, they asked about a music video, where she replied; "The video is coming out very soon... but if you want a sneak peek check out my Facebook page for photos of the video shoot." A picture was uploaded on 20 July for the single, where it featured a car on a beach front. A fan asked her on Twitter about the music video. She replied confirming the music video is finished.

On 20 August 2012 the music video was released. It featured Duff singing, and enjoyed time with her boyfriend on the beach in Kaikōura. It featured her singing and walking on a mountain and featured them with friends. Basically the video shows her and her boyfriend moving away from her parents home, who originated in Christchurch to move away to somewhere else.

=== Live performances ===
On 24 August 2012 Duff performed the song live on NZ TV channel Four. She then performed the single on What Now. Duff is expected to perform the song on the "TitaniumMusik" tour with the New Zealand group Titanium. She then performed the song live on The Edge.

== Track listing ==
Digital download
No.	Title	Length
1.	"Til The End"	3:40
Total length:		3:40

Digital download (remix)
No.	Title	Length
1.	"Til The End" (Remix featuring K.One)	3:40
Total length:		3:40

== Charts and certifications ==
Chart (2012)	Peak Position
New Zealand NZ Singles (RIANZ)	2
New Zealand (RIANZ)	23

== Release history ==
Region	Date	Format	Label
New Zealand	13 July 2012	Digital Download	Illegal Musik
New Zealand	13 July 2012	Digital Download (Remix version)	Illegal Musik
