= Ivy Lies =

New Zealand rock band

- Origin: New Zealand
- Genres: Alternative rock Pop rock Pop punk
- Instruments: Vocals, guitar, drums, keyboard, bass guitar
- Years active: 2006–present
- Label: Warner
- Members: Emla Palmer; Lisa Blatchford; Rosie O'Connell

Ivy Lies is an all-female New Zealand rock band. They are best known for their hit single "Addicted". Band members are Emla Palmer (lead vocals/rhythm guitar), Lisa Blatchford (bass/vocals), and Rosie O'Connell (drums).

== History ==
=== Early work ===
In 2001 when Emla, Lisa and Rosie were 14 years old they decided to form a band called "Starlett" in their hometown of Christchurch. Years later the band caught a lot of attention performing at bars in their area and a performance at the "RockQuest" competition led to a record deal with Sony BMG. At the time the girls released two singles, "What I Had‟, which went straight to a Top 5 Radio hit and "Let It Go‟, which placed at number 15.

=== 2008–present ===
In 2008 the girls relocated to Auckland where they met Mihka and changed the band name to Ivy Lies. In mid-2009 the girls travelled to Los Angeles to record their album with producer Clif Magness and then in December 2009 their single "Addicted" was released and went to number 8 on RIANZ (the New Zealand charts). Addicted also went to number one for artist and video on the Myspace music charts for December 2009. In January 2010, they played a series of open-air concerts in New Zealand as part of the Coca-Cola Bands on the Beach tour. The band also played on the radio station The Edge's Sausage Fest 2010, along with acts such as Midnight Youth, Dane Rumble and David Dallas. The single "Never Enough" was officially released on iTunes on 12 April 2010. The music video for Never Enough premiered on New Zealand television on 16 April on the C4 music channel. The single "I Lie Awake" was released on iTunes on 16 August 2010. They also supported You Me at Six on their concert in Auckland on 21 September 2010. The fourth single "Highway" was released on 14 February 2011. On 7 January 2011, the band officially announced on their Facebook that Mihka had left the band. Their debut album "Little Mind Games" was released on 28 February 2011.

== Discography ==
Ivy Lies discography
- Studio albums: 1
- Singles: 4
- Music videos: 6

=== Albums ===
- Little Mind Games (2011)

=== Singles ===
Year	Title	Peak chart positions	Album
Year	Title	NZ	Album
2009	"Addicted"	20	Little Mind Games
2010	"Never Enough"	—	Little Mind Games
2010	"I Lie Awake"	—	Little Mind Games
2011	"Highway"	—	Little Mind Games
"—" denotes a recording that did not chart or was not released in that territory.

== Band members ==
- Emla Palmer – lead vocals, rhythm guitar (2006–present)
- Lisa Blatchford – bass guitar, backing vocals (2006–present)
- Rosie O'Connell – drums (2006–present)

== Former members ==
- Mihka Chee – lead guitar, backing vocals (2008–2010)
