= The Checks (band) =

New Zealand rock band

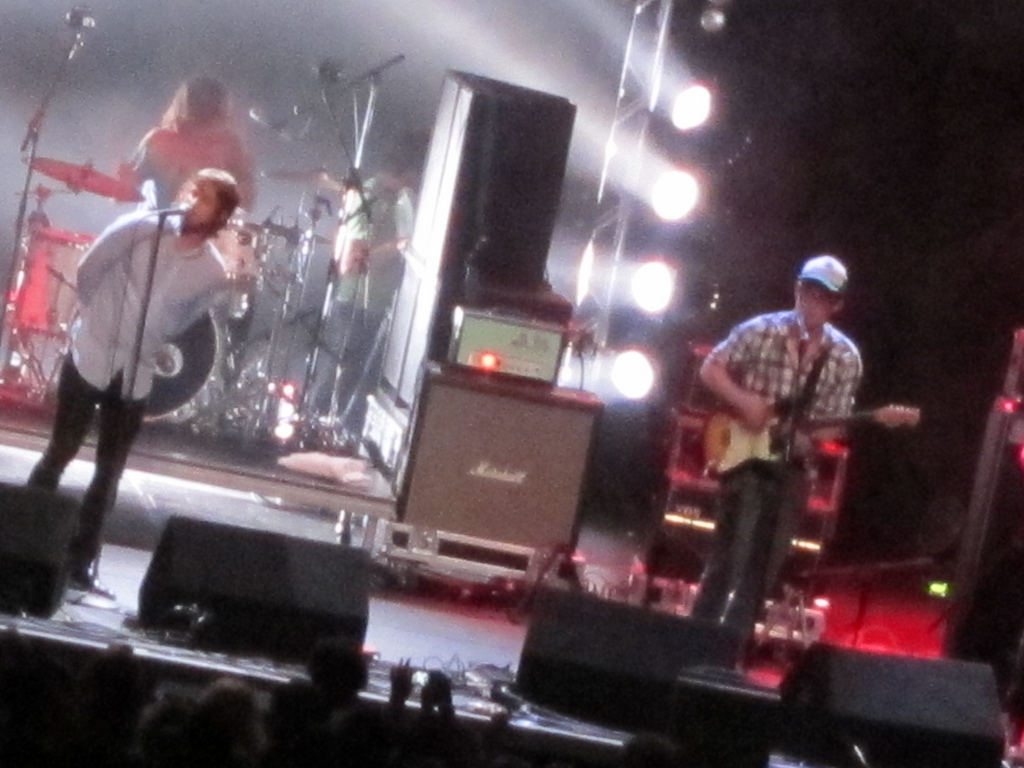
- The Checks at Homegrown, Wellington, February 2012

Background information
- Origin: North Shore, Auckland
- Genres: Rock, garage rock
- Years active: 2002–2012
- Labels: Full Time Hobby, Pie Club Records
- Past members: Edward Knowles; Sven Pettersen; Callum Martin; Karel Chabera Jr. Jacob Moore
- Website: thechecks.net

The Checks were a New Zealand rock band known for blues-driven, high-energy rock. The group released three albums, Hunting Whales, Alice by the Moon and Deadly Summer Sway and toured extensively before splitting up in 2012.

== History ==
The Checks were formed in 2002 when Takapuna Grammar School friends Ed Knowles, Sven Pettersen, Karel Chabera, Jacob Moore and Callum Martin came together over a mutual love of music. The newly formed band got their first break by impressing bFM breakfast DJ Hugh Sundae, and went on to win the Auckland regional finals of the Smokefreerockquest, qualifying them for the 2003 finals. In 2004 the group won Most Promising New Act at the bNet Music Awards, and then picked up the Most b.Net Radio Play award for their song "Mercedes Children" in 2005. The Checks reputation grew and with only one single released, the group were personally selected by R.E.M. to open for them on their 2005 New Zealand tour, and were invited by NME editor Conor McNicholas to join the NME New Music Tour of the UK in 2005.

The Checks were signed for a four-album deal with UK record label Full Time Hobby (through Sony/BMG UK) and moved to England to record their debut LP. Hunting Whales was released in October 2007 and spent four weeks in the New Zealand album charts, peaking at number 21. Despite some success in the UK, Full Time Hobby records could no longer support the band. The Checks could not sustain living in the UK and return to New Zealand, recording under their own label, Pie Club Records. As well as touring in New Zealand, Australia, Europe and the United States, the Checks also played support gigs for The Hives, Oasis, Jet, Muse, The Killers and AC/DC.

In 2008 the group recorded new song "There is a Field", released as a non-album digital download, before recording their self-produced second album Alice by the Moon in Auckland in early 2009. Alice by the Moon was released in June 2009 to critical acclaim and peaked at number 13 in the New Zealand album charts. In 2010 Alice by the Moon was shortlisted for the Taite Music Prize and won Rock Album at the 2010 NZ Music Awards, with the Checks also being nominated for Best Group.

The group recorded their third album Deadly Summer Sway in 2011 which was also released to favourable reviews. The group released a trilogy of music videos for the songs "Candyman Shimmer", "Ready To Die" and "Perfect Lover", directed by the Trophywife collective.

In August 2012, the Checks announced they were breaking up. No reason was given for the split.

== Members ==
- Edward Knowles – vocals
- Sven Pettersen – lead guitar
- Callum Martin – guitar, backing vocals
- Karel Chabera Jr. – bass guitar
- Jacob Moore – drums, backing vocals

== Discography ==
=== Albums ===
Year	Title	Details	Peak chart positions
Year	Title	Details	NZ
2007	Hunting Whales	Released: 1 October 2007; Label: Full Time Hobby/Sony BMG	21
2007	Take Me There EP	Released: 9 June 2007; Label: Full Time Hobby/Sony BMG	—
2009	ZM Live Lounge: The Checks EP	Released: 2 June 2009; Label: Pie Club Records	—
2010	Alice by the Moon	Released: 3 September 2010; Label: Pie Club Records	13
2011	Deadly Summer Sway	Released: 11 November 2011; Label: Pie Club Records	25

=== Singles ===
Year	Title	Peak chart positions	Album
Year	Title	NZ	Album
2005	"What You Heard"	21	Hunting Whales
2007	"Take Me There"	—	Hunting Whales
2007	"Hunting Whales"	—	Hunting Whales
2008	"There is a Field"	—	'Non-album single'
2009	"You and Me"	12	Alice by the Moon
"—" denotes a recording that did not chart or was not released in that territory.

=== Music videos ===
Year	Music video	Director(s)
2005	"What You Heard"	Dylan Pharazyn
2006	"Hunting Whales"	
2007	"Take Me There"	Diamond Dogs
2007	"What You Heard"	Diamond Dogs
2007	"Tired From Sleeping"	Sam Peacocke
2008	"Terribly Easy"	Ian Hart
2008	"There is a Field"	Benjamin Rood
2009	"You and Me"	Tim van Dammen
2009	"Til the Dance Is Over"	Tim van Dammen
2010	"Ballroom Baby"	Benjamin Rood
2011	"Candyman Shimmer"	Trophywife/Ian Hart
2011	"Ready To Die"	Trophywife
2012	"Perfect Lover"	Trophywife and the Filth Collective

== Awards ==
Year	Nominee / work	Award	Result
2004	The Checks	bNet Music Awards - Most Promising New Act	Won
2005	"Mercedes Children"	bNet Music Awards - Most b.Net Radio Play	Won
2005	"What You Heard"	NZ Music Awards - Breakthrough Artist of the Year	Won
2010	Alice by the Moon	NZ Music Awards - Best Group	Nominated
2010	Alice by the Moon	NZ Music Awards - Best Rock Album	Won
2010	Alice by the Moon	Taite Music Prize - Finalist	Nominated
2012	Deadly Summer Sway	NZ Music Awards - Best Rock Album	Won
