= J. Williams (singer) =

- Born: Joshua Elia Williams; 3 September 1986 (age 40); Māngere, Auckland
- Origin: South Auckland, New Zealand
- Genres: R&B, hip hop
- Instruments: Vocals, guitar
- Years active: 2008–present
- Labels: Illegal Musik; Warner Music New Zealand
- Website: myspace.com/jwilliamsmusik

Joshua Elia Williams (born 3 September 1986), known by his stage name J. Williams, is a New Zealand R&B recording artist and professional hip-hop dancer. He made his musical debut in 2008 with "Blow Your Mind" which peaked at number 13 on the New Zealand Singles Chart. In early 2009 his debut album Young Love was released with the single "You Got Me" featuring Scribe. It was certified platinum and became the #1 selling single of 2010 in New Zealand.

== Early life and education ==
Joshua Elia Williams was born in Auckland, New Zealand His father is of Samoan descent and his mother of Fijian descent. He attended Weymouth Intermediate School in Weymouth, South Auckland and attended James Cook High School in Manurewa.

He compares his upbringing to that of the Jackson 5 family, as his father was very strict regarding religion and music. Williams' has two younger sisters, Keziah and Ezra, and two older sisters, Emily and Lavinia, who have both appeared on Australian Idol in 2005 (runner-up) and 2006 (top-8), respectively.. In 2023, his younger sister, Ezra, finished runner-up on season 12 of The Voice Australia.

== Career ==
Williams was a member of the hip hop street dance group originally called Dziah (now known as Prestige). In 2006 Dziah represented New Zealand at the World Hip Hop Dance Championships in Los Angeles. They came second to the current champions, the Philippine All Stars. In 2008 at the same competition, this time as Prestige, they came fourth.

From 2008 to March 2011 Williams received over NZ$100,000 in funding from the taxpayer-funded New Zealand On Air. This included $50,000 to produce the album, and multiple grants to make music videos.

=== 2008 – 2010: Young Love ===
In September 2008 "Blow Your Mind" was released as the lead single from Williams' debut album. It peaked at number 13 on the New Zealand Singles Chart. Second single "Set it Off", was released to commercial radio stations in early 2009 and charted at number thirty six. In March 2009, Williams released his third single, "Ghetto Flower", which peaked at number 5 on the same chart. The song was certified Gold in New Zealand on 9 June 2009, selling over 7,500 copies. and was written by his sister, Emily Williams. The fourth single, "Stand with You", was released in June 2009, and peaked at number 6 in New Zealand, becoming his second consecutive top-10 single. It featured his sister, Lavina Williams. The song was certified Gold in New Zealand on 13 September 2009, selling over 7,500 copies.

On 13 July 2009 Williams released his debut album, Young Love. The album debuted at number five on the New Zealand Top 40 Albums Chart and was certified gold. On 9 November 2009 Williams released his fifth single from the album, "Your Style" which featured New Zealand singer, Erakah. The single peaked at number 16 on the New Zealand Singles Chart.

In February 2010, Williams released sixth single "You Got Me", featuring New Zealand rapper Scribe. The single peaked at number one on the New Zealand Singles Chart, and was certified Platinum. In December 2010, it was declared that "You Got Me" was the #1 selling single of 2010 in New Zealand.

=== 2010 – present ===
On 25 May 2010 Williams released "Takes Me Higher", which features pop singer Dane Rumble. The single only had a digital release. It peaked at number two on the New Zealand Singles Chart. In December 2010, "Takes Me Higher" was declared the #19 best seller of 2010 in New Zealand. "Night of Your Life" was released on 11 October 2010 and received a gold certification. In 2010 Williams toured Germany.

In 2012, Williams was the supporting act for New Zealand boy band, Titanium on their Come On Home Tour.

== Personal life ==
Williams and his partner Larissa Brown separated shortly before the birth of their child Ryder, and stories of alcohol-fuelled violence emerged. Williams stepped down from his post as Rugby World Cup ambassador. Williams underwent counselling, and in 2012 rekindled a relationship with his high school sweetheart, Renee Marriot.

== Discography ==
J. Williams discography
- Studio albums: 1
- Singles: 11
- Music videos: 10
- Featured singles: 3

=== Studio albums ===
Year	Album details	NZ chart	Certifications (sales thresholds)
2009	Young Love: Released: 13 July 2009; Label: Illegal Musik, Warner; Formats: CD, digital download	5	NZ: Gold

=== Singles ===
Year	Title	NZ peak chart position	Certifications (sales thresholds)	Album
2008	"Blow Your Mind"	13	—	Young Love (and Collector's Edition)
2008	"Set It Off"	36	—	Young Love (and Collector's Edition)
2009	"Ghetto Flower"	5	NZ: Platinum	Young Love (and Collector's Edition)
2009	"Stand with You" (featuring Lavina Williams)	6	NZ: Gold	Young Love (and Collector's Edition)
2009	"Your Style" (featuring Erakah)	16	—	Young Love (and Collector's Edition)
2010	"You Got Me" (featuring Scribe)	1	NZ: Platinum	Young Love (and Collector's Edition)
2010	"Takes Me Higher" (featuring Dane Rumble)	2	NZ: Platinum	TBA
2010	"Night of Your Life" (featuring K.One)	4	NZ:Gold	TBA
2011	"Want to Rule the World" (featuring K.One)	29	—	TBA
2011	"Live It Up"	—	—	TBA
2013	"Never Let Go" (featuring DJ Lenium)	—	—	TBA

==== As featured artist ====
Year	Title	NZ peak chart position
2008	"Them Eyes" (Mareko featuring J. Williams)	39
2010	"My Love" (DJ CXL featuring J. Williams and The Gift)	—
2011	"She's a Killer" (K.One featuring J. Williams)	26
2017	"Wide Awake" (BAR9 featuring Paradigm Shift & J. Williams)	—

=== Music videos ===
Year	Title	Director
2008	"Blow Your Mind"	
2008	"Set It Off"	
2009	"Ghetto Flower"	Ivan Slavov
2009	"Stand with You"	Ivan Slavov
2009	"Your Style"	Ivan Slavov
2010	"You Got Me"	Damien Caine
2010	"Takes Me Higher"	Ivan Slavov
2010	"Night of Your Life"	Anthony Plant

== Awards and nominations ==
Year	Type	Award	Result
2010	APRA Awards	APRA Silver Scroll ("You Got Me" with Scribe)	Nominated
2010	New Zealand Music Awards	Vodafone Single of the Year ("You Got Me")	Nominated
2010	New Zealand Music Awards	Best Male Solo Artist (Young Love)	Nominated
2010	New Zealand Music Awards	Best Urban/Hip-Hop Album (Young Love)	Nominated
2010	Pacific Music Awards	Best Pacific Urban Artist	Nominated
2010	Pacific Music Awards	Best Pacific Male Artist	Won
