= Don't Know What to Do (Dane Rumble song) =

Single by Dane Rumble

from the album The Experiment
- Released: 16 February 2009 (New Zealand)
- Genre: Electropop, dance-pop
- Length: 3:53
- Label: Rumble Music/Warner
- Songwriter(s): D. Rumble

Dane Rumble singles chronology
"Always Be Here" (2009)	"Don't Know What to Do" (2009)	"Cruel" (2009)

Australian Cover

"Don't Know What to Do" is a song by New Zealand singer Dane Rumble, released as the second single from Rumble's debut solo album, The Experiment. The track was released as a digital single in February 2009.

== Single information ==
Rumble says the song is about his love/hate relationship with music. "I've experienced so many ups and downs in this game... and I still can't stop." Dane once again worked with Ivan Slavov for the music video, who had already directed the video for "Always Be Here". The song was sent to Australian contemporary hit radio on 29 November 2010.

"Don't Know What to Do" debuted on the New Zealand Singles Chart on 27 July 2009 at #36. The song has so far peaked at number 10, becoming Rumble's second consecutive top 20 single as a solo artist and his first top ten hit.

"Don't Know What to Do" also debuted on the Top 40 the same week Dane's previous single "Always Be Here" drops out of the Top 40.

On 31 January 2010, "Don't Know What to Do" was certified Gold with sales of over 7,500 in New Zealand.

== Music video ==
The music video for "Don't Know What to Do" was released at the iTunes Store on 16 February 2009, the same day as the single and "Always Be Here".

== Promotional events ==
- 24 August 2009 – More FM Radio
- 25 August 2009 – ZM Radio Interview
- 18 September 2009 – The Transmission Room Gig
- 24 September 2009 – The Edge Nudie Nuptials Performance
- 24 September 2009 – Juice Bar Gig
- 26 September 2009 – C4 Top 40 Countdown

== Chart performance ==
Chart (2009)	Peak position
NZ Singles Chart	10
NZ Top 100 Airplay Chart	9
NZ Pop Airplay Chart	7
NZ Adult Contemp. Chart	11
NZ Most Added Chart	5
NZ40 Singles Chart	1
C4 Music Video Chart	9
Juice TV Music Video Chart	13
