= Cruel (Dane Rumble song) =

Single by Dane Rumble

from the album The Experiment
- Released: 23 November 2009 (digital)
- Genre: Electropop, dance-pop, rap
- Length: 3:52 (non-rap version); 4:04 (rap version)
- Label: Rumble Music/Warner
- Songwriters: D. Rumble, S. King, T. Reeder

Dane Rumble singles chronology
"Don't Know What to Do" (2009)	"Cruel" (2009)	"Everything (Take Me Down)" (2010)

"Cruel" is a pop rock track by New Zealand singer Dane Rumble. "Cruel" is the third solo single by Rumble, which was released as a digital download single on 23 November 2009. "Cruel" became Rumble's third consecutive top 20 hit in New Zealand, peaking at #3 on the Official New Zealand Singles Chart. The single was certified Platinum on 22 March 2010, selling over 15,000 copies.

== Single information ==
Rumble announced he had shot the music video for his new track on Tuesday 6 October, a week later he confirmed that the title would be "Cruel" and would be added to radio stations over the next few weeks. It was sent to Australian contemporary hit radio on 21 February 2011.

Rumble previewed "Cruel" on the C4TV Weekend Countdown.

The artwork for "Cruel" was shown on Dane Rumble's official Myspace page on 17 November.

After eight weeks on the singles chart, on 20 January, "Cruel" climbed to #5, making it Rumble's first solo top 5 hit in New Zealand. On 27 January, "Cruel" further climbed to #3 and was certified Gold, selling over 7,500 copies. On 15 February, Rumble released the Starving DJs remix of "Cruel" with alternative cover art. On 22 March 2010, "Cruel" was certified Platinum for selling over 15,000 copies throughout New Zealand.

== Music video ==
The video was directed by Ivan Slavov, who also directed "Always Be Here" and "Don't Know What to Do". It was released at the iTunes Store on 14 December 2009. The music video is about a man who left the girl of his dreams behind on earth. Through the video he declines every way she tries to contact him. At the end of the video when the girl arrives on the space ship she finds the man fleeing. In between these clips Dane Rumble and his band are seen singing and playing the instruments in space.

== Chart performance and certification ==
Chart (2009)	Peak position
New Zealand Singles Chart	3

Country	Certification	Sales
New Zealand	Platinum	15,000+

== Certifications ==
Certifications for "Cruel"
Region	Certification	Certified units/sales
New Zealand (RMNZ)	2× Platinum	60,000^{‡}
^{‡} Sales+streaming figures based on certification alone.
