= Set It Off (J. Williams song) =

Single by J. Williams

from the album Young Love
- Released: 27 October 2008
- Recorded: 2008
- Genre: Electropop
- Length: 3:20
- Songwriter(s): J Williams, L Williams & I Finau

J. Williams singles chronology
"Blow Your Mind" (2008)	"Set It Off" (2008)	"Ghetto Flower" (2009)

Set It Off is the second single from New Zealand R&B artist J. Williams. It was released on 27 October 2008. It debuted and peaked on the RIANZ charts at number 36 on 22 December 2008.
