= Everything (Take Me Down) =

Single by Dane Rumble

from the album The Experiment
- Released: 12 April 2010 (digital)
- Genre: Electropop, dance-pop
- Length: 3:48 (radio edit); 4:06 (album version)
- Label: Rumble Music/Warner
- Songwriters: D. Rumble, S. King, T. Reeder

Dane Rumble singles chronology
"Cruel" (2009)	"Everything (Take Me Down)" (2010)	"Takes Me Higher" (2010)

"Everything (Take Me Down)" is the fourth single taken from Dane Rumble's debut album The Experiment. The single was released digitally to iTunes and Digirama on April 12, 2010.

== Single information ==
Dane announced on The Edge radio station in late March that the fourth single would be "Everything (Take Me Down)" despite funding for a music video for "Gonna Be Mine" from New Zealand on Air.

The single was added as a digital single on 12 April 2010 on websites such as iTunes Store and Digirama.

"Everything (Take Me Down)" has so far peaked at #20 on the Official New Zealand Singles Chart after 4 weeks on the chart. "Everything" became Dane's 5th consecutive top 20 single following on from "Always Be Here" (#13, March 2009), "Don't Know What to Do" (#10, August 2009), "Cruel" (#3, December 2009) and "Takes Me Higher" (#2, June 2010).

== Music video ==
The video is of a teenage girl who takes her father's car and travels up to Auckland with two male friends to see Dane Rumble play live. There are scenes of Rumble performing live cut into the scenes of the three teens. When the girl arrives home the next morning she is greeted by her father shaking is head in disapproval of her taking the car without permission.

== Chart performance ==
Chart (2010)	Peak position
New Zealand Singles Chart	20
Radioscope Top 100	5
NZ Most Added to Radio Chart	1
NZ40 Singles Chart	1
NZ Pop Airplay Chart	8
NZ A/C Chart	3
