= Hunting Whales (album) =

Studio album by The Checks
- Released: October 1, 2007
- Label: Full Time Hobby
- Producer: Ian Broudie

The Checks chronology
| Hunting Whales (2007) | Take Me There (2007) |

Hunting Whales is the debut LP from New Zealand band The Checks. The album was released in New Zealand, United Kingdom, and Australia on 1 October 2007. It reached number 21 on the New Zealand albums chart. Hunting Whales was released in Germany and Switzerland on 23 November 2007. The album features the previously released singles "What You Heard" and "Take Me There".

== Track listing ==
1. Mercedes Children
2. Take Me There
3. What You Heard
4. Tired From Sleeping
5. Where Has She Gone
6. Terribly Easy
7. Honest Man
8. See Me Peter
9. Don't Wait
10. Hunting Whales
11. Memory Walking
