= Set the Record Straight (Fast Crew album) =

Studio album by Fast Crew
- Released: December 2004
- Genre: NZ hip hop, pop-rap
- Length: 58:21
- Label: Universal Music

Fast Crew chronology
Set the Record Straight (2004)	Truth, Lies & Red Tape (2008)

Alternative cover

Singles from Set the Record Straight
- 1. "I Got" Released: 2004; 2. "It's The Incredible" Released: 2004; 3. "Suburbia Streets" Released: 2005

Set the Record Straight is the debut album by New Zealand group, Fast Crew released in 2004.

It debuted on the New Zealand Albums Chart at number eleven, where it peaked. The album remained on the chart for 21 weeks.

== Track listing ==
1. "Intro"
2. "Set The Record Straight"
3. "Breath It In"
4. "It's The Incredible"
5. "Oops My Bad"
6. "Interlude"
7. "Don't Speak My Name"
8. "Suburbia Streets"
9. "Make It Hot"
10. "I Got"
11. "Interlude"
12. "Follow Close"
13. "Your World And Mine"
14. "Whoa There I Go Again"
15. "Make The World Spin"
16. "Under Pressure"
17. "Got What You Want"
18. "Push The Point"
19. "Smashin"
20. "Mr Radio Part II"

== Charts ==
Chart (2004/05)	Peak position
Australian Albums (ARIA Charts)	52
New Zealand	11
