= Night of Your Life (J. Williams song) =

Single by J. Williams featuring K.One
- Released: 11 October 2010
- Genre: R&B
- Length: 3:44
- Label: Illegal Musik
- Songwriter(s): I.Finau, J. Williams & K.Vitale

J. Williams singles chronology
"Takes Me Higher" (2010)	"Night of Your Life" (2010)

K.One singles chronology
"Walking Away" (2010)	"Night of Your Life" (2010)	"I Like It" (2010)

"Night of Your Life" is an R&B single by New Zealand singer J. Williams. It features vocals by rapper K.One.

== Music video ==
The music video was released on 5 November in New Zealand and is set at a poolside and shows J. Williams singing on a stage at night and also shows the singer dancing behind both a black and white background with Prestige. It was both directed and produced by Anthony Plant.

== Chart performance ==
"Night of Your Life" entered the New Zealand Singles Chart on 18 October 2010 at number four, which was its peak position. Making it Williams 5th Top 10 single.

== Charts ==
Chart (2010)	Peak position
New Zealand Singles Chart	4
