= Stand with You =

Single by J. Williams featuring Lavina Williams

from the album Young Love
- Released: 22 June 2009
- Genre: R&B
- Length: 4:13
- Label: IllegalMusik/Warner
- Songwriter(s): J Williams, L Williams, I Finau

J. Williams singles chronology
"Ghetto Flower" (2009)	"Stand with You" (2009)	"Your Style" (2009)

"Stand with You" is the fourth single from J. Williams' first studio album, Young Love. The song features Williams' sister, Lavina Williams.

== Music video ==
J. and Lavina Williams singing in Auckland

The music video was financially supported by New Zealand On Air. The music video starts with a teenaged boy window shopping, then walking through a train station, where he is met by a group of other boys who tease and bully him about a flier for a talent quest in his bag, before walking to a skating half-pipe, where he watches J. Williams dance. When invited to join in, he walks away. The boy walks home and teaches himself to hip-hop dance, intending to enter the talent quest. On the morning of the talent quest, the boy finds a pair of new shoes left by Williams. The video closes with the boy executing his dance routine, with the audience, including Williams, cheering for him. These scenes are all in black-and-white, except when the boy is performing his dance routine. This plot is interspersed with scenes of J. and Lavina Williams singing together (in colour) in Auckland locations, notably in front of the Sky Tower.

== Chart performance ==
The single entered the New Zealand Singles Chart of 20 June 2009 at 13th position, and peaked on both 10 and 24 August 2009, at 6th position. The song was later certified gold for selling 7,500+ digitally.

Chart (2009)	Peak position
New Zealand Singles Chart	6

=== End of year charts ===
Chart (2009)	Ranking
New Zealand Singles Chart	39
