= Fast Crew =

New Zealand hip hop group

- Origin: Auckland, New Zealand
- Years active: 1999–2008
- Label: AKrite Records
- Past members: Dane Rumble (1999–2008); Diablo Deville (1999–2008); DJ Alias (1999–2008); Jerome Fortune (1999–2007); Rebecca Le Harle (1999–2006); Gemma Copas (2006-2008)

Fast Crew (or fastCREW) were a New Zealand hip hop group consisting of five members – Dane Rumble (a.k.a. Kid Deft), Jeremy Kent-Johnston (a.k.a. Jerome Fortune), Brad Devcich (a.k.a. Diablo), Gemma Copas and Josh Thorne (DJ Alias).

Their first album, Set the Record Straight, and achieved gold status, and Fast Crew supported international artists such as Missy Elliott, Busta Rhymes, The Black Eyed Peas, D12, Chingy, and DMX, and played at the Big Day Out tours. After completing their second album, Truth, Lies & Red Tape, the band played their last concert and "a mutual decision to split the band was decided" in late 2008.

== History of the band ==
Fast Crew was formed in Auckland, New Zealand, in 1999, and after some experimentation, the group began playing live around Auckland. Their first single Mr Radio was released in 2002 and received high radio and television airplay.

In May 2004, Fast Crew released the single "I Got", which spent 23 weeks on the New Zealand Top 40 Singles Chart and achieved gold status. As a result of the success of "I Got", the group began to open for such international acts such as Busta Rhymes and Missy Elliott on their New Zealand tours and were signed as the first act on new independent central Auckland based record label AKrite Records, who entered into a deal with Universal Music to distribute the group's singles and album Set the Record Straight. "I Got" finished the year at No. 17 on the New Zealand Top 40 Chart for 2004.

While "I Got" spent time on the charts, Fast Crew began working on their first album Set the Record Straight and released their second single of the album, "It's the Incredible", in November.

The album Set the Record Straight was released in December 2004 and achieved gold status within a week of its release and a peak position of No. 11. With the release of the album the group toured New Zealand to promote it. The album also reached the top 100 in Australia and continued to rise up the charts with the success of the latest single release in Australia, "Suburbia Streets". The band also performed to rave reviews at music festival 'Big Day Out' Auckland and East Coast cities of Australia.

Fast Crew's third single from Set the Record Straight, called "Suburbia Streets", was released in March 2005 and reached a height of No. 10 in NZ.

With continued success in New Zealand Fast Crew entered Australia with "I Got" reaching No. 22 on the ARIAnet singles chart in May 2005, following the rise and success of fellow New Zealand rapper Scribe. In August the same year, It's the Incredible was also released in Australia, reaching No. 41. "Suburbia Streets" debuted on 20 February 2006 at No. 39 in the Australian charts.

The Fast Crew's efforts in breaking the Australian market were dealt a small blow in late 2005 after it was found that the group had used an unauthorised sample of the Eagles's song "Victim of Love" in their track "It's the Incredible". The album and single were immediately withdrawn in both the New Zealand and Australian markets. The album was re-released into the Australian market with a remix (sample free) version of "It's the Incredible".

Fast Crew received 3 nominations at the 2006 Australasian Urban Music Awards : Nominations for Best Hip Hop Single "I Got", Best Hip Hop Album Set the Record Straight and Best Hip Hop Group.

The group split up after Jeremy, the main producer left the Crew a year before they ended in late 2008.

== Truth Lies and Redtape ==
"What Happened to Yesterday (Full Mix)" is the first single off the album Truth Lies and Redtape which was re-released online (This occurred due to distributing issues of the album to the music stores) on 29 September 2008 and in stores 13 October 2008.

The latest single Fly was released 26 May 2008 but did not make it onto the New Zealand Music charts. Fast Crew also a third single off Truth Lies and Redtape titled Highs and Lows which was released early in 2009.

== Discography ==
Fast Crew discography
- Studio albums: 2
- Singles: 7

=== Albums ===
List of albums, with Australian chart positions
Title	Album details	Peak chart positions		Certifications (sales thresholds)
Title	Album details	NZ Chart	AUS	Certifications (sales thresholds)
Set the Record Straight	Released: December 2004; Label: Universal; Format: CD	11	52	NZ: Platinum
Truth, Lies & Red Tape	Released: 28 September 2008; Label: Universal; Formats: CD, digital download	—	—	
"—" denotes a title that did not chart, or was not released in that territory.

=== Singles ===
Year	Title	Chart peak positions		Album
Year	Title	NZ	AUS	Album
2002	"Mr Radio"	—	—	non-album single
2004	"I Got"	4	22	Set the Record Straight
2004	"It's the Incredible"	5	41	Set the Record Straight
2005	"Suburbia Streets"	10	31	Set the Record Straight
2007	"What Happened to Yesterday"	—	—	Truth, Lies & Red Tape
2008	"Fly"	—	—	Truth, Lies & Red Tape
2009	"Highs and Lows"	—	—	Truth, Lies & Red Tape
"—" denotes a title that did not chart, or was not released in that territory.
