= Suburbia Streets =

2005 single by Fast Crew

Single by Fast Crew

from the album Set the Record Straight
- Released: 2005
- Length: 4:24 (album version); 3:52 (radio edit)
- Label: King Music; Warner Music Australia
- Songwriter(s): Kent-Johnson; Devcich; Benner

Fast Crew singles chronology
"It's the Incredible" (2004)	"Suburbia Streets" (2005)	"What Happened to Yesterday" (2007)

"Suburbia Streets" is the third single released by New Zealand hip hop group Fast Crew, released in 2005 in New Zealand and in February 2006 in Australia. The song reached number 10 in New Zealand and number 31 in Australia

== Track listing ==
Suburbia Streets EP
No.	Title	Length
1.	"Suburbia Streets" (radio edit)	3:52
2.	"Suburbia Streets" (DJ Logikal remix)	3:55
3.	"Whoa There I Go Again"	3:56
4.	"Suburbia Streets" (instrumental)	4:24
5.	"Suburbia Streets" (A Cappella)	3:54

Physical EP only
No.	Title	Length
6.	"Suburbia Streets" (video)

== Charts ==
Chart (2005–2006)	Peak position
Australia (ARIA)	31
New Zealand (Recorded Music NZ)	10

== Release history ==
Region	Date	Format(s)	Label(s)	Ref.
New Zealand	2005	CD	King Music	
Australia	13 February 2006	CD	Warner Music Australia	
