= K.One =

New Zealand rapper

- Born: Kaleb Vitale
- Occupation: Rapper
- Instrument: Vocals
- Years active: 2010—Present
- Label: Illegal Musik

Kaleb "K.One" Vitale is a New Zealand rapper, currently signed to Illegal Musik. The most successful song of his career is featuring with J. Williams on "Night of Your Life" which reached number 4 on the RIANZ charts and received gold certification in 2010.

== Personal life ==
Kaleb is originally from Masterton, in the Wairarapa district of New Zealand, and previously made his living in the forestry industry. He has two daughters named Dream and Summer-Jade and also a son Kyrie.

== Music career ==
=== 2010 - present: debut album ===
"Never" featuring Junipah was released as the lead single for Vitale's debut album. His next single "Walking Away" featuring Jason Kerrison from Opshop made it to the RIANZ charts at number 38. He also made many singles as a featured artist from which all came from fellow label mates. The most successful one was his song with J. Williams on "Night of Your Life" which peaked at number 4 on the RIANZ charts and received a gold certification. There is also to be a single for his daughters on the album.

In 2012, K.One was the supporting act for New Zealand boy band, Titanium on their Come On Home Tour.

== Discography ==
K.One discography
- Singles: 2
- Mixtapes: 1

=== Studio albums ===
Year	Album details	NZ	Certifications (sales thresholds)
2012	Far from Home: Released October 2012; Label: Illegal Musik, Warner	21	

=== Mixtapes ===
Year	Title
2010	Welcome to the Bright Lights

=== Singles ===
Year	Title	NZ
2010	"Never" (featuring Junipah)	—
2010	"Walking Away" (featuring Jason Kerrison)	38
2011	"She's a Killer" (featuring J. Williams)	26
2014	"Love Don't Live Around Here"	

==== Featured singles ====
Year	Title	NZ	Album
2010	"Alone No More" (Vince Harder featuring K.One)	—	Non-album single
2010	"Natural" (DJ CXL featuring Erakah and K.One)	—	Non-album single
2010	"Night of Your Life" (J. Williams featuring K.One)	4	TBA
2010	"I Like It" (Illegal Banditz featuring Brooke Fowler and K.One)	—	Non-album single
2011	"Want to Rule the World" (J. Williams featuring K.One)	29	TBA
2015	"Team, Ball, Player, Thing" (#KiwisCureBatten featuring Lorde, Kimbra, Brooke Fraser, et al.)	2	Non-album single
