= Lavina Williams =

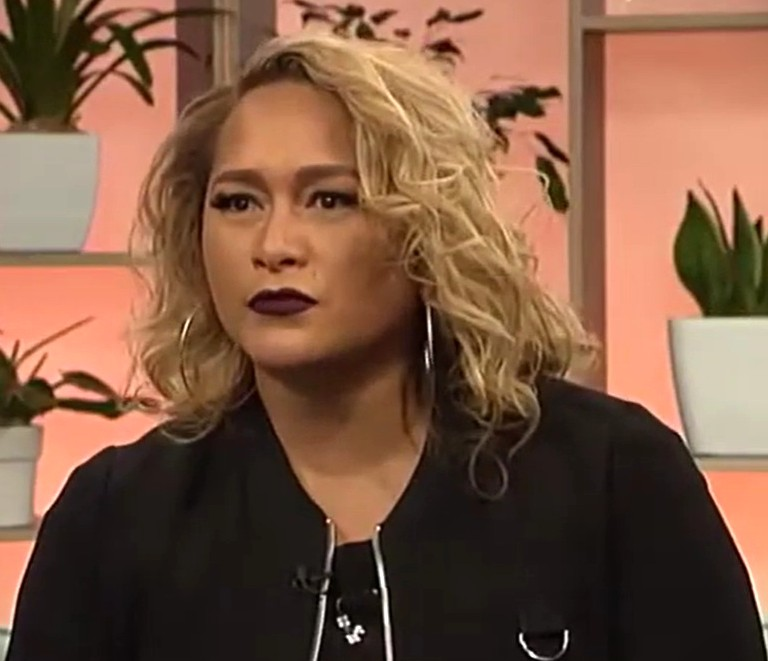
- Williams in 2017

Background information
- Also known as: Miss L Lavina Williams
- Born: Lavina Rose Williams; 13 June 1979 (age 47); Auckland, New Zealand
- Genres: RnB; Soul
- Occupations: Singer; Musical Theatre Actress
- Years active: 1996–present
- Member of: Ma-V-Elle
- Formerly of: Young Divas

Lavina Rose Williams (born 13 June 1979) is a New Zealand musical artist and musical theatre performer.

Williams began her career as a member of the 1990s the girl group Ma-V-Elle. The group had multiple songs in the New Zealand music charts, including Never Say Goodbye, Freedom, Show Me Heaven, and Three Flow.

In 2006, Williams competed in the 4th season of Australian Idol, finishing in the top 8 of the competition. Her younger sister, Emily Williams, was the runner-up in the prior third season (won by Kate DeAraugo).

Williams briefly joined her younger sister's girl group, Young Divas, in 2007, which also featured DeAraugo, Lavina's season four runner-up, Jessica Mauboy; season 1's Paulini; and season 2's Ricki-Lee Coulter. She has since pursued a musical theatre career, performing in The Lion King, Hairspray, Dreamgirls, and Sister Act.

As a singer, she has been the backing vocalist for many New Zealand artists including Ginny Blackmore and Stan Walker. She featured in her brother J. Williams's song Stand with You, which reached 6th in the New Zealand charts.

Williams has also featured in some of Mika Haka's singles, including Coffee and Loved Me A Man.

== Ma-V-Elle ==
The group formed at James Cook High School, Manurewa in the mid 1990s. Ma-V-Elle's name comes from the first names of the three members - Marina, Lavina and Maybelle. The group was originally managed by Tim Mahon. Their debut album Spoken To was released in 1997, with the trio touring nationally and internationally, including two performances at Ronnie Scott's Jazz Club in London.

Member Marina Davis left in 1998 for religious reasons, with Maybelle and Lavina continuing as a duo. The group released their second album, Angel in 1999, with a heavier, drum and bass-inspired sound. Both Maybelle Galuvao and Lavina Williams were nominated for the Most Promising Female Vocalist award at the 2000 New Zealand Music Awards, losing to Vanessa Kelly of Deep Obsession.

Ma-V-Elle performed together for the first time in 13 years with a surprise reunion at the 2013 Pacific Music Awards. The group released new single "Let's Go (To the Sky)" and performed at the Parachute music festival in January 2014.

== Australian Idol ==
Top 24: "(You Make Me Feel like) a Natural Woman" by Aretha Franklin
Top 12: "If I Ain't Got You" by Alicia Keys Bottom 2
Top 11: "Bring Me to Life" by Evanescence
Top 10: "Don't Leave Me This Way" by Thelma Houston Bottom 3
Top 9: "Too Much Heaven" by The Bee Gees
Top 8: "Best of My Love" by The Emotions Eliminated

== Notable performances ==
Williams has been a regular performer at Christmas in the Park. She performed in 2014, and returned in 2015 to sing a solo of Joy to the World and perform Aotearoa with Stan Walker. She also performed in 2016, 2017, 2018, and 2019.

She performed regularly at the Big Gay Out event at Coyle Park. She has performed in 2014, 2015, 2016 and 2017.

== Personal life ==
Williams is the older sister to J. Williams, Emily Williams and Ezra Williams.

She was born in New Zealand, and is of Samoan and Fijian descent.

== Discography ==
=== with Ma-V-Elle ===
==== Albums ====
- Spoken To (1997)
- Angel (1999)

==== Singles ====
Year	Title	Peak chart positions	Album
Year	Title	NZ	Album
1997	"Show Me Heaven"	36	Spoken To
1997	"Three Flow"	43	Spoken To
1997	"Depend On Me"	—	Spoken To
1998	"Freedom"	29	Spoken To
1998	"Love Is"	—	Spoken To
1998	"Angel"	—	Angel
1999	"Never Say Goodbye"	26	Angel
1999	"Don't Be So Shy"	—	Angel
2013	"Let's Go (To the Sky)"	—	Non-album single
"—" denotes a recording that did not chart or was not released in that territory.

=== Featured on ===
Year	Title	NZ peak chart position	Certifications (sales thresholds)	Album
2009	"Stand with You" (by J. Williams)	6	NZ: Gold	Young Love (and Collector's Edition)
2014	"Coffee" (by Mika Haka)	—	—	Non-Album Single
2016	"Loved Me A Man" (by Mika Haka)	—	—	Non-Album Single
2020	"Tahi" (by Mika Haka)	—	—	The Aroha Collective
2020	"Rima" (by Mika Haka feat. Yorke)	—	—	The Aroha Collective
2020	"Whitu" (by Mika Haka feat. Mokoera Te amo )	—	—	The Aroha Collective
2020	"Waru" (by Mika Haka)	—	—	The Aroha Collective
2020	"Iwa" (by Mika Haka feat. King Homeboy & Te amo)	—	—	The Aroha Collective

== Awards ==
Year	Award Ceremony	Award	Work	Art	Result	Ref
2000	New Zealand Music Awards	Most Promising Female	Lavina Williams	Music	Nominated	
2017	The Variety Artists Club of New Zealand Inc	Pacific Entertainment Award for Top Female Vocalist	Lavina Williams	Music	Won	
