= DJCXL =

New Zealand DJ and producer

- Origin: New Zealand
- Genre: Hip hop
- Label: Illegal Musik
- Member of: Ill Semantics
- Website: www.djcxl.com

DJCXL, is a New Zealand DJ, producer and member of the band Ill Semantics. He was the 2003 NZ Disco Mix Club Champion.

He has collaborated with many New Zealand and international artists on tracks including King Kapisi's "Second Round KO" and "Dazzling DJ" with Black Wall Street Japan's S.H.O.. He also remixed the Chicago producer Mulatto Patriot's "International Connection", which featured Eternia, De:Joeso and DJ Goersch.

His first album as a solo producer was due in late 2010. The first single from the album, "My Love", featured the R&B artist J Williams and the rapper The Gift. The track was released to New Zealand radio in the third week of January 2010.

In 2012, DJCXL was the supporting act for the New Zealand boy band Titanium on their Come On Home Tour.

== Discography ==
=== Albums ===
Date of release	Title	Label
2002	Theory of Meaning	Dawn Raid
2006	Good Music	Illegal Musik
