= Young Love (J. Williams album) =

Studio album by J. Williams
- Released: 13 July 2009
- Recorded: 2008–2009
- Genre: R&B, hip hop, rap
- Label: Illegal Musik, Warner Music Group
- Producer: Ill Semantics, NOX, MC Patriarch

Collector's Edition cover

Singles from Young Love
- 1. "Blow Your Mind" Released: 11 August 2008; 2. "Set It Off" Released: 27 October 2008; 3. "Ghetto Flower" Released: 16 March 2009; 4. "Stand with You" Released: 22 June 2009; 5. "Your Style" Released: 9 November 2009; 6. "You Got Me" Released: 8 February 2010

Young Love is the debut album by New Zealand R&B singer J. Williams, released on 13 July 2009 by Illegal Musik. It was a success, certified Gold by the Recording Industry Association of New Zealand (RIANZ). The album debuted on the New Zealand Albums Chart at number five, and has sold over 8000 copies.

== Recording and production ==
Described as an honest and open discourse into the life of Williams, the album, features guest appearances from fellow New Zealand rappers Mareko & Scribe, label mates Temple Jones, Erakah and D Love, plus a duet with his sister Lavina Williams.

== Reception ==
=== Critical reception ===
Dane Anderson of More FM said that on Young Love "Williams thrives, on the faster, more rhythmic songs...While the slower songs aren't quite up to the par of say Usher or Ne-Yo just yet, you can't deny the catchiness in them."

=== Commercial performance ===
Young Love peaked at its debut position of number five on the New Zealand Album Chart before falling out after eight weeks. It then re-entered the chart after the release of the Collectors Edition, and was certified Gold, selling over 7,500 copies. The album spent a total of twenty-eight weeks in the album chart.

== Singles ==
- "Blow Your Mind" peaked at number thirteen on the RIANZ New Zealand Singles Chart.
- "Set It Off" was released to commercial radio stations in early 2009, and it charted on the official RIANZ Top 40 singles chart, peaking at number thirty-six.
- "Ghetto Flower" peaked at number five on the RIANZ chart and was certified gold on 9 June 2009, as it has sold over 7,500 copies in New Zealand.
- "Stand with You" featured Williams' sister, Lavina Williams. It peaked at number six and was certified Gold after 10 weeks on the chart.
- "Your Style featured Erakah, and peaked at number sixteen on the New Zealand Singles Chart in its fourth non-consecutive week on that chart.
- "You Got Me", featuring rapper Scribe, peaked at number one on the RIANZ chart, and was certified in its sixth week of charting.

== Track listing ==
Standard edition
No.	Title	Length
1.	"Intro"	0:44
2.	"Ghetto Flower"	3:54
3.	"Set It Off"	3:38
4.	"Blow Your Mind"	3:48
5.	"Flavour"	3:57
6.	"Solideress" (featuring Temple Jones)	3:54
7.	"Vanilla Ladies" (D. Love)	4:04
8.	"Stand with You" (featuring Lavina Williams)	4:21
9.	"Beautiful (What If)"	4:05
10.	"Why"	4:07
11.	"Crazy Love"	3:57
12.	"Your Style" (featuring Erakah)	3:28
13.	"Till It's Gone"	4:01
14.	"Flavour" (Acoustic version)	3:56
Total length:		51:54

Collector's Edition (Disc One)
No.	Title	Length
1.	"Intro"	0:44
2.	"Ghetto Flower"	3:54
3.	"Set It Off"	3:38
4.	"Blow Your Mind"	3:48
5.	"Flavour"	3:57
6.	"Solideress" (featuring Temple Jones)	3:54
7.	"Vanilla Ladies" (D. Love)	4:04
8.	"Stand with You" (featuring Lavina Williams)	4:21
9.	"Beautiful (What If)"	4:05
10.	"Why"	4:07
11.	"Crazy Love"	3:57
12.	"Your Style" (featuring Erakah)	3:28
13.	"Till It's Gone"	4:01

Collector's Edition (Disc Two)
No.	Title	Length
1.	"You Got Me" (featuring Scribe)	3:45
2.	"Blow Your Mind" (Remix featuring D. Love)
3.	"Ghetto Flower" (Remix featuring D. Love)
4.	"Set It Off" (Remix featuring D. Love)
5.	"Ghetto Flower" (Mad Russian Remix)
6.	"Flavour (Unplugged)" (featuring Jakes & NOX)	3:54
7.	"Your Style" (Remix featuring Erakah and Tyree)	3:51
