= Juice TV Awards =

Music video award in New Zealand

- The logo of the Juice TV Awards in 2002
- Awarded for: Best in New Zealand music videos
- Location: Auckland
- Country: New Zealand
- First award: 2001
- Final award: 2011

Television/radio coverage
- Network: Juice TV

The Juice TV Awards was an annual New Zealand music video award presentation held by the now defunct New Zealand music video channel Juice TV (later Juice). The awards were founded in 2001 and initially honoured music videos from both New Zealand and international acts, however in 2004 the awards were limited to New Zealand artists only. Finalists were selected by Juice, with the winners chosen by public vote. No ceremony was held in 2009 and the awards were last held in 2011. Juice TV closed in 2015.

== Coke Juice TV Awards 2001 ==
The first Juice TV Awards were held in Auckland. Rock band Pluto performed.

Winners (incomplete)

- Best R&B Video: Christina Aguilera, Lil' Kim, Mýa and Pink - "Lady Marmalade"

== Coke 2002 Juice TV Awards ==
The 2002 awards were held on Monday 2 September at the Hilton Hotel in Auckland. The event included live performances from Goodshirt, Anika Moa, Heavy Jones Trio, Tadpole, Carly Binding, Nesian Mystik and Betchadupa.

Winners (incomplete)

- Best Video: Goodshirt - "Sophie"
- Breakthrough Video Artist: Blindspott - "Room to Breathe"
- Best Female Video: Anika Moa - "Falling in Love Again"
- Best Male Video: Che Fu "Misty Frequencies"
- Best Group Video: Incubus - "Are You In?"
- Best Electronic Video: Dirty Vegas "Days Go By"
- Best Hip Hop/R&B Video: Nesian Mystik - "It's On"
- Best Indie Video: Rubicon - "Happy Song"
- Best Pop Video: TBC
- Best R&B Video: Che Fu - "Random"
- Best Rock Video: TBC

== 2003 Juice TV Music Awards ==
The 2003 awards were held at Float Bar on Monday 1 September 2003. Acts who performed at the event included WBC, James Reid, and members of Elemeno P, Gramsci and 48 May. New Zealand acts won eight of the 11 awards.

Winners

- Video Artist of the Year: Justin Timberlake
- Breakthrough Video Artist: Scribe - "Stand Up"
- Best Solo Video: Bic Runga - "Something Good"
- Best Group Video: Elemeno P - "Verona"
- Best Hip Hop Video: King Kapisi - "U Can't Resist Us "
- Best Indie Video: dDub - "Give Up Your Love"; 48 May - "Fightback"
- Best RnB/Urban Video: Salmonella Dub - "Dancehall Girl"
- Best Rock Video: Evanescence - "Bring Me to Life"
- Best PlayStation 2 Game: Grand Theft Auto
- Coke Choice Award: Zed - "Starlight"

== 4th Annual Juice TV Awards (2004) ==
The 2004 awards were held on Monday 30 August 2004 at Float bar, Auckland. The event included an appearance from Killing Heidi and performances by Pluto and Mozelee. For the first time the 2004 awards were limited to New Zealand artists. The Juice'd Up! Award was decided by a live text vote.

Winners

- Best Video: Misfits of Science - "Fools Love"
- Breakthrough Video: Goodnight Nurse - "Loners"
- Best Solo Video: Brooke Fraser - "Saving the World"
- Best Group Video: Goodshirt - "Buck It Up"
- Best Electronic Video: Salmonella Dub - "Nu Steppa"
- Best Hip Hop Video: Scribe - "Not Many"
- Best Indie Video: Lucid 3 - "AM Radio"
- Best Rock Video: Sommerset - "Say What You Want"
- Best Urban Video: Katchafire - "Colour Me Life"
- Juice’d Up: 48May - "Leather and Tattoos"
- People's Choice Award: 48May - "Leather and Tattoos"

== Bacardi Juice TV Awards (2005) ==
The 2005 awards were held on Monday 29 August 2005 at The Studio in Auckland. For the first and only time, the awards included two general music categories - Album of the Year and Song of the Year, as well as the Special Lifetime Achievement Award. The event include performances from My Life Story, 48May, King Kapisi, Lucid 3, Fast Crew, Pluto and dDub. The winners were determined by public vote.

Winners

- Video of the Year: Steriogram - "Go"
- Breakthrough Video: My Life Story - "Falling Out"
- Best Electronic Video: Shapeshifter - "Long White Cloud"
- Best Hip Hop Video: Fast Crew - "Suburbia Streets"
- Best Indie Video: Tadpole - "Too Hard"
- Best Rock Video: Blindspott - "Yours Truly"
- Best Roots Video: The Black Seeds - "So True"
- Album of the Year: Shihad - Love Is the New Hate
- Song of the Year: 48May - "Home by 2"
- Special Lifetime Achievement Award for services to R.O.C.K: Sommerset

== 2006 Jim Beam Long Black Juice TV Awards ==
The 2006 awards were held on Monday 9 October 2006 at St Matthew-in-the-City church. Acts who performed at the event included Billy TK Junior, The Tutts, Tyree, Stylus, Gasoline Cowboy, Opshop, Autozamm, and PNC.

Winners

- Video of the Year: Sarah Brown - "Hands"
- Best Breakthru Video: The Tutts "K"
- Best Solo Video: Don McGlashan - "Miracle Sun"
- Best Group Video: Stellar - "Whiplash"
- Best Electronic Video: Minuit - "Suave As Sin"
- Best Hip Hop Video: King Kapisi - "Lollipop"
- Best Indie Video: Odessa - "Promises"
- Best Rock Video: Goodnight Nurse - "Death Goes To Disco"
- Best Roots Video: The Black Seeds - "Sometimes Enough"

== Juice TV Music Awards 2007 ==
The 2007 awards were held at the Transmission Room, Auckland. The event included performances from The Mint Chicks, Cornerstone Roots, Annabel Fay, Autozamm, Tahuna Breaks, Young Sid, The Exiles and Brian Platt.

Winners

- Video of The Year: Liam Finn – "Gather At The Chapel"
- Breakthrough Video: Kimbra – "Simply On My Lips"
- Best Solo Video: Brooke Fraser – "Deciphering Me"
- Best Group Video: Opshop - "Maybe"
- Best Electronic Video: Shapeshifter – "Electric Dream"
- Best Hip-Hop Video: Scribe – "F.R.E.S.H."
- Best Indie Video: Duchess – "Raglan City"
- Best Rock Video: Blindspott – "Lull"
- Best Roots Video: Katchafire "Frisk Me Down"

== 8th Annual Juice TV Awards (2008) ==
The 2008 awards were held on Tuesday 30 September at the Stamford Plaza. The event included appearances from Nathan King, Luke Thompson, Clap Clap Riot, The Feelers, Autozamm and Jonny Love. Future New Zealand prime minister John Key attended the function in the run-up to the 2008 general election.

Winners

- Top Video: 48May - "Car Crash Weather"
- Video Artist Of The Year: - Tiki Taane
- Breakthrough Video: Jonny Love - "Not The First Not The Last"
- Best Solo Video: Tiki Taane - "Always on My Mind"
- Best Group Video: Goodnight Nurse - "The Night"
- Best Hip Hop Video: Nesian Mystik - "Nesian 101"
- Best Rock Video: False Start - "Four Letter Lie"
- Best Roots/Eletronica Video: - Tahuna Breaks "Real Life"

== 2009 ==
No awards were presented in 2009.

== Grabaseat Juice TV Awards 2010 ==
The 2010 awards were held on Monday 31 May 2010 at the Windsor Castle in Auckland. The awards were moved to May from their usual autumn time in order to coincide with New Zealand Music Month. 60,000 votes were cast in total.

Winners

- Video of the Year: Dukes – "Vampires"
- Break Thru Video: Ivy Lies – "Addicted"
- Best Solo Video: Dane Rumble – "Cruel"
- Best Group Video: Midnight Youth – "Cavalry"
- Best Electronic Video: Kids of 88 – "Just a Little"
- Best Hip Hop Video: J. Williams featuring Scribe – "You Got Me"
- Best Indie Video: Crescendo Mafia – "I Told You So"
- Best Metal Video: In Dread Response – "Cannons at Dawn"
- Best Rock Video: Shotgun Alley – "Look At Me Now"
- Best Roots Video: Fat Freddy's Drop – "Pull the Catch"
- Innovation Award: J. Williams featuring Scribe – "You Got Me"

== Juice TV Awards 2011 ==
The 2011 awards were held in September 2011. New awards were added but the overall number of awards were reduced. For the first time since 2003, the awards were again open to international artists as well as New Zealanders. This was to be the final Juice TV Awards. The station closed in May 2015.

Winners

- Video of the Year: Katy Perry - "Last Friday Night (T.G.I.F.)"
- NZ Video of the Year: Zowie - "Broken Machine"
- Breakthru Video of the Year: Six60 - "Rise Up 2.0"
- Best Group Video: LMFAO - "Party Rock Anthem"
- Hottest Male: Bruno Mars
- Hottest Female: Katy Perry
