= Tadpole (disambiguation) =

A tadpole is the aquatic larval stage in the life cycle of an amphibian.

Tadpole or Tadpoles may also refer to:

== Transportation ==
- Tadpole (dinghy), a small boat
- Grumman G-65 Tadpole, an American prototype light amphibian airplane first flown in 1944
- Armstrong Whitworth Tadpole, a variant of the Westland Walrus reconnaissance aircraft of the 1920s
- Tadpole, a type of three-wheeled car
- Tadpole, a type of tricycle

== Places ==
- Tadpole Bridge, in Oxfordshire, England
- Tadpole Galaxy, a galaxy with a long tidal trail
- Mount Tadpole, Oates Land, Antarctica
- Tadpole Island, Graham Land, Antarctica

== Music ==
- Tadpole (band), a New Zealand band
  - Tadpole (album), an album by Tadpole
- Tadpoles (band), an American psychedelic rock band
- Tadpoles (album), an album by the Bonzo Dog Band

== Film and television ==
- Tadpole (film), a 2002 American film directed by Gary Winick
- "Tadpole" or Tad Reeves, a character in the Australian soap opera Neighbours
- one of the title characters of the American animated TV series Spunky and Tadpole, which aired from 1958 to 1961

== Other uses ==
- Tadpole (physics), a type of Feynman diagram
- Tadpole Computer, an American computer company
- Tadpole Bridge, across the River Thames in Oxfordshire, England
- Tadpole pupil, an abnormal eye condition
- "Tadpole", a nickname of Robert T. Smith (1918-1995), American World War II flying ace and Flying Tiger
- Tadpole, a UK term for a type of Aqua-lung

== See also ==
- Polliwog (disambiguation)
- Tadpole person
