= Gareth Thomas (musician) =

New Zealand musician (born 1971)

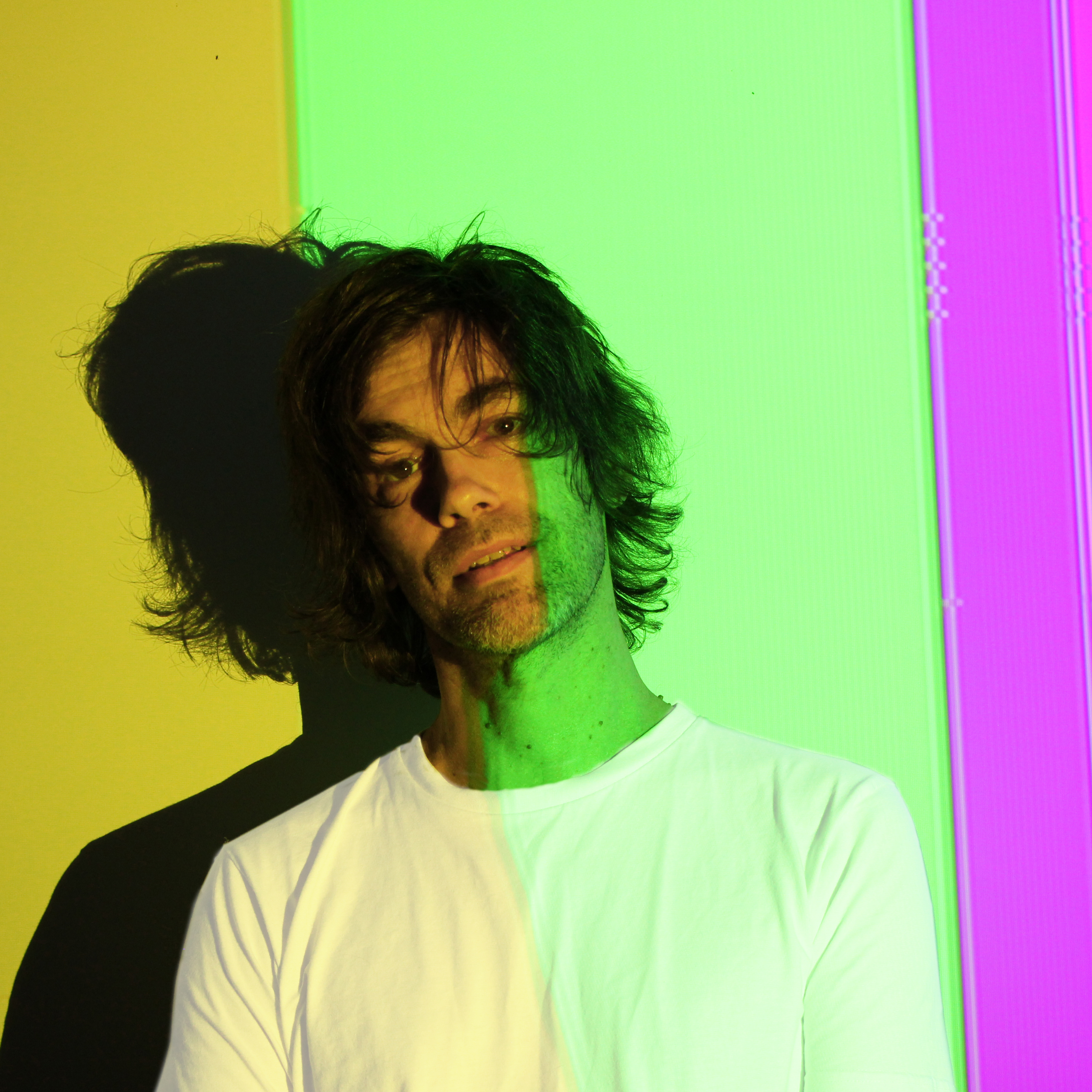
- Gareth Thomas

Background information
- Born: 7 September 1971 (age 54)
- Origin: Wellington New Zealand
- Genres: Indie Musician, music producer, songwriter, multi instrumentalist
- Instruments: Piano, vocals, synthesizers, guitars, bass, drum programming and saxophone
- Years active: 2001-present
- Publisher: Songbroker
- Member of: Goodshirt
- Formerly of: Fazerdaze
- Website: www.facebook.com/gareththomastunes/

Gareth Thomas is a New Zealand musician, songwriter, music producer, and architectural designer.

Thomas first became known as a member of the indie pop band Goodshirt, where he contributed as a writer and performer. He wrote the band’s 2002 single "Sophie", which reached number one on the New Zealand Singles Chart.

He later collaborated with other New Zealand artists, including working as a co-writer and co-producer with Amelia Murray of the AMA award winning band Fazerdaze for eight years. Thomas has also worked with musician and later Green Party MP Steve Abel during the period when Abel was developing his songwriting.

Since 2011 Thomas has released two albums and 11 singles under his own name. Alongside his music career, Thomas works part-time as an architectural designer.

== Early life ==
Gareth Thomas was born in Wellington New Zealand in 1971. He recognised the sounds of a piano in his father's Beatles and Split Enz records and in 1982 decided he wanted to learn how to play piano. His group KOTRAB won first place the national Westpac Schools Music Contest in 1987, Thomas excelled in music and art at NPBHS and he also enjoyed drama class after school. This drama club was where he met a girl from NPGHS called Sophie and he wrote a song about her. Thirteen years later that song became the Goodshirt break out single Sophie.

== Beginnings ==
When Thomas finished his Architectural degree at Auckland Uni he found himself a residency performing Irish music in his band called the Trouser Weasels. This band included his Elam Art School friends Rodney Fisher and Mike Beehre. The three of them talked about the power of music and naturally wanted to start writing and recording their own music. Inspired by the home recordings of Chris Knox, Thomas spent the bulk payment of his first private architectural job on recording equipment and a Pentium 486 computer. They set it all up in Rodney's garden shed, Murray Fisher joined in and Goodshirt was formed.

== Goodshirt ==
In 2001 Goodshirt's home recorded debut album was picked up by EMI. They earned local and international recognition with their eclectic songs and music videos directed by Supergroove's Joe Lonie. Thomas' song "Sophie" hit number one on the New Zealand Music Singles charts in 2002 and received Tui awards for Best Single, Best Song Writer and Best Video for Goodshirt. Silver Scroll nominations followed and the band had received accolades, from both indie and mainstream institutions, including a B-net award for Best New Act, with the two albums Good and Fiji Baby. legacy continues with "Sophie" being included in "The Great New Zealand Songbook" and in the TV series Anthems.

Nick Bollinger music writer, critic and contributor to RNZ said "Goodshirt's 2001 album Good is not just good. It's an essential New Zealand album"

Thomas still performs regularly with the other three founding members of Goodshirt to this day.

== Solo releases ==
Thomas released his first solo album Lady Alien in 2011 to critical acclaim with the Dominion Post giving it 5/5 stars, describing it as "Kiwi indie pop at its best" and Real Groove magazine as a work of "gorgeously understated supreme talent". The single Google Song received an honourable mention at the International Songwriting Competition in 2010 and Gone Cold won a first in the international Unsigned Only competition in 2015.

With his second solo release, the upbeat Fizzy Milk album, the accolades continued. "One of the best local albums of the year" – Lydia Jenkin, NZ Herald. Graeme Reid of Elsewhere said "Fizzy Milk sets a very high threshold for intelligent Kiwi pop albums this year – highly recommended". And there was another International Songwriting Competition honourable mention in 2016 for the single All Eyes In The Room.

== Other collaborations ==
=== Fazerdaze ===
In 2013 Thomas and Amelia Murray formed Fazerdaze. The band started in much the same way Thomas had started Goodshirt, in a garden shed. Thomas played bass and brought his friend Andrea Holmes (of Fang) in on drums to complete the 3-piece. Thomas then set up a home recording studio for Fazerdaze at his place in Morningside and showed Murray all the home recording techniques he had developed with Goodshirt. There they made the album 'Morningside' (mixed by Murray Fisher of Goodshirt), Thomas introduced Murray to Flying Nun Records owner Ben Howe who later signed Fazerdaze. For 8 years Thomas contributed significantly to the production and writing of almost all of the Fazerdaze songs including the break out singles Lucky Girl, Come Apart, Bigger and the APRA Silver Scroll top 5 finalist Cherry Pie.

The musical collaboration between Thomas and Murray concluded after having completed the EP Break and 8 of the 11 songs of the album "Soft Power" in 2021. Murray's publicity surrounding the releases did not reference Thomas’s musical contribution as co-producer and co-writer on the EP and album. There was no music credits to Thomas on the album sleeves, and no mention of Thomas in the Fazerdaze AMA award wins.

=== Steve Abel ===
From 1999 Thomas supported the song writing talent of Green Party MP Steve Abel. Thomas would accompany Steve's bare bones guitar style with piano and piano accordion, contributing production ideas and melodies to Abel's songs. They formed a "Super Group" with members of Goldenhorse and Pluto and called it the Chrysalids. Thomas recorded the albums "Little Death" and "Flax Happy" with Abel. Thomas contributed piano, piano accordion and drum production to Abel's song "Hospice for Destitute Lovers" that was a theme for Florian Habicht's art noir feature film Woodenhead. Thomas supported Abel's music pro bono and in return Abel thanked and credited him in his publicity.

== Architectural career ==
Thomas works part time as an Architectural Designer. He has contracted to large firms such as Jasmax, Warren & Mahoney and Architectus. Notably he won an NZIA award for Francis Group Architects with his design for Orewa Sports Facilities, was a key team member for Jasmax in the Auckland City Rail Link project and designed his parents' home in Akaroa while working with Athfield Architects.

== Style and influences ==
Thomas' music has been described as DIY Indie Pop. Reviewers often commenting on an "abundance of synthesizer hooks, singing bass lines with simple but smart arrangements" and "relatable lyrics that never stray into the trap of cliché" His songwriting inspiration originated from the succinct, colloquial poetry of New Zealand poet Sam Hunt who visited his school assembly in 1984. Likewise when he bought his first two records, Lou Reed's Transformer and New Sensations the observational, minimal, but personal lyrics had a huge effect on him. The angular, artful New Wave music of Split Enz shaped his teenage years. When his band Goodshirt toured with The Flaming Lips for the Big Day Out in 2004, the joy of their weird and wonderful performances left a lasting impression.

DISCOGRAPHY
ARTIST	TITLE	TYPE	DATE
Goodshirt	Good	Album	2001
	Fiji Baby	Album	2004
	Skinny Mirror	EP	2012
Gareth Thomas (solo)	Lady Alien	Album	2010
	Fizzy Milk	Album	2016
Fazerdaze	EP	EP	2014
	Morningside	Album	2017
	Break!	EP	2022
	Soft Power	Album	2024
Steve Abel	Little Death	Album	2005
	Flax Happy	Album	2009
The Gramophone Band	The Gramophone Band	Album	2017

SONG/VIDEO REFERENCES
ARTIST	TITLE	DATE	ACHIEVEMENTS
Goodshirt	Blowing Dirt	2001	
	Sophie	2002	2003 AMA for Best Single, Best Songwriter, Best Video 2002 Peaked at #1 in The New Zealand Singles Charts
	Green	2003	
Gareth Thomas (solo)	Google Song	2011	2010 Honourable Mention in the International Songwriting Competition
	Gone Cold	2015	2015 Winner in international Unsigned Only Competition
	All Eyes in The Room	2016	2016 Honourable Mention in the International Songwriting Competition
	I'd Like	2016	
	Wallow	2016	
	Weird Fever	2017	
	Wake Up	2020	
	My Dog	2020	
	Cyber Star	2021	
