= New Zealand top 50 singles of 2008 =

This is a list of the top 50 singles in 2008 in New Zealand, as listed by the Recording Industry Association of New Zealand (RIANZ).

== Chart ==
Songs in grey shading indicates a song of New Zealand origin.

Key
† – Song of New Zealand origin (Note: Whether or not a song is of New Zealand origin is determined by the RIANZ)

Rank	Artist	Title
1	Jordin Sparks featuring Chris Brown	"No Air" from the album, Jordin Sparks
2	Flo Rida featuring T-Pain	"Low" from the album, Mail On Sunday and Step Up 2: The Streets soundtrack
3	Tiki Taane	"Always on My Mind"† from the album, Past, Present, Future
4	Chris Brown	"Forever" from the album, Exclusive: The Forever Edition
5	Chris Brown	"With You" from the album, Exclusive
6	Lady Gaga	"Poker Face" from the album, The Fame
7	Usher featuring Young Jeezy	"Love in This Club" from the album, Here I Stand
8	Leona Lewis	"Bleeding Love" from the album, Spirit
9	Katy Perry	"I Kissed a Girl" from the album, One Of The Boys
10	Nesian Mystik	"Nesian 101"† from the album, Elevator Musiq
11	P-Money featuring Vince Harder	"Everything"† from the album, Everything
12	Lady Gaga featuring Colby O'Donis	"Just Dance" from the album, The Fame
13	Kid Rock	"All Summer Long" from the album, Rock n Roll Jesus
14	Basshunter featuring DJ Mental Theo's Bazzheadz	"Now You're Gone" from the album, Now You're Gone – The Album
15	Kings of Leon	"Sex On Fire" from the album, Only By The Night
16	Rihanna	"Take a Bow" from the album, Good Girl Gone Bad: Reloaded
17	T.I.	"Whatever You Like" from the album, Paper Trail
18	Lil Wayne featuring Static Major	"Lollipop" from the album, Tha Carter III
19	P!nk	"So What" from the album, Funhouse
20	Ne-Yo	"Closer" from the album, Year Of The Gentleman
21	Rihanna	"Disturbia" from the album, Good Girl Gone Bad: Reloaded
22	Rihanna	"Don't Stop The Music" from the album, Good Girl Gone Bad
23	Phil Collins	"In the Air Tonight" from the album, Face Value
24	T.I. featuring Rihanna	"Live Your Life" from the album, Paper Trail
25	Katy Perry	"Hot n Cold" from the album, One Of The Boys
26	Opshop	"One Day"† from the album, Second Hand Planet
27	Beyoncé Knowles	"If I Were a Boy" from the album, I Am... Sasha Fierce
28	Britney Spears	"Piece of Me" from the album, Blackout
29	Pussycat Dolls	"When I Grow Up" from the album, Doll Domination
30	Duffy	"Mercy" from the album, Rockferry
31	Madonna featuring Justin Timberlake & Timbaland	"4 Minutes" from the album, Hard Candy
32	Soulja Boy featuring Arab	"Yahhh!" from the album, souljaboytellem.com
33	Three 6 Mafia; Project Pat, Yung D & SuperPower	"Lolli Lolli (Pop That Body)" from the album, Last 2 Walk
34	The Veronicas	"Untouched" from the album, Hook Me Up
35	Estelle featuring Kanye West	"American Boy" from the album, Shine
36	Leona Lewis	"Better In Time" from the album, Spirit
37	Ne-Yo	"Miss Independent" from the album, Year Of The Gentleman
38	Jordin Sparks	"One Step at a Time" from the album, Jordin Sparks
39	Lil Mama featuring T-Pain and Chris Brown	"Shawty Get Loose" from the album, VYP: Voice Of The Young People
40	Metro Station	"Shake It" from the album, Metro Station
41	Keri Hilson	"Energy" from the album, In A Perfect World...
42	Flight of the Conchords	"The Distant Future"† from the extended play of the same name
43	Miley Cyrus	"See You Again" from the album, Hannah Montana 2: Meet Miley Cyrus
44	MGMT	"Electric Feel" from the album, Oracular Spectacular
45	Gabriella Cilmi	"Sweet About Me" from the album, Lessons To Be Learned
46	Chris Brown featuring Keri Hilson	"Superhuman" from the album, Exclusive: The Forever Edition
47	Usher	"Moving Mountains" from the album, Here I Stand
48	T-Pain	"Church" from the album, Epiphany
49	Soulja Boy	"Crank That" from the album, souljaboytellem.com
50	The Ting Tings	"That's Not My Name" from the album, We Started Nothing

== Top 20 singles of 2008 by New Zealand artists ==
Rank	Artist	Title
1	Tiki Taane	"Always On My Mind"
2	Nesian Mystik	"Nesian 101"
3	P-Money featuring Vince Harder	"Everything"
4	Opshop	"One Day"
5	Flight Of The Conchords	"The Distant Future"

- #6-20 are currently unavailable
