= Paul Matthews =

Paul Matthews may refer to:

- Paul Taunton Matthews (1919–1987), British theoretical physicist
- Paul Matthews (bishop) (1866–1954), Episcopal bishop of New Jersey
- Paul Matthews (musician) (born 1978), New Zealand musician, songwriter, and record producer
- Paul Matthews (poet), British poet featured in Children of Albion
- Paul Matthews (footballer) (1946–2026), English footballer
- Paul Matthews (filmmaker) (born 1957), British film producer, writer, and director
