= USS Osage (LSV-3) =

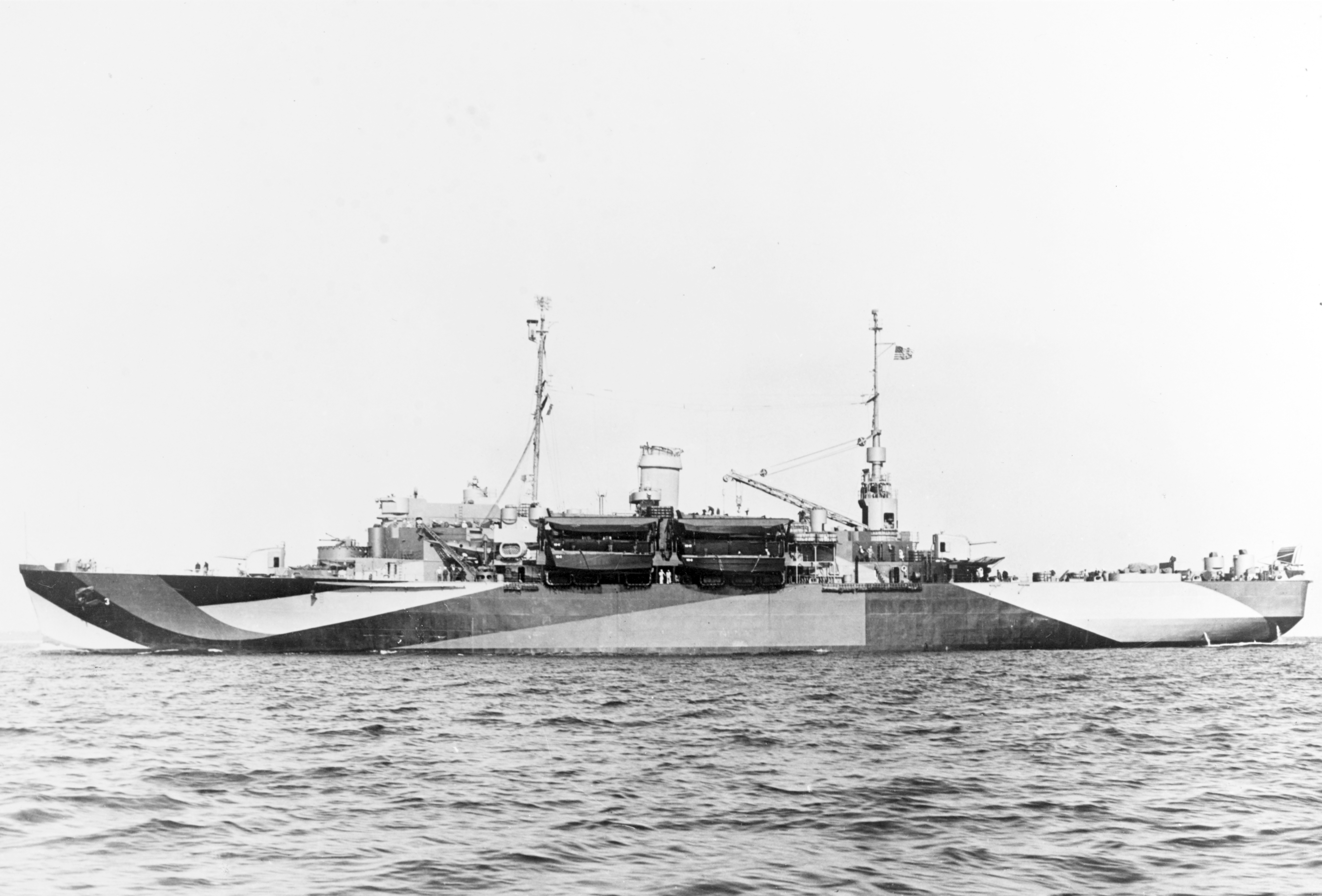
- USS Osage underway, wearing green-and-black camouflage, date and location unknown.

History

United States
- Name: USS Osage
- Builder: Ingalls Shipbuilding Corporation, Pascagoula, Mississippi
- Laid down: 1 June 1942, as AN-3 (Net laying ship)
- Launched: 1 December 1943
- Commissioned: 30 December 1944
- Decommissioned: 16 May 1947
- Reclassified: AP-108 (Transport), 1 May 1943; LSV-3 (Landing Ship Vehicle), 21 April 1944; MCS-1 (Mine Warfare Command and Support Ship), 18 October 1956
- Stricken: 1 September 1961
- Honours and awards: 1 battle star (World War II)
- Fate: Sold for scrapping, 11 December 1974

General characteristics
- Class & type: Osage-class vehicle landing ship
- Displacement: 4,626 long tons (4,700 t) light; 9,040 long tons (9,185 t) full
- Length: 458 ft (140 m)
- Beam: 60 ft 2 in (18.34 m)
- Draft: 20 ft (6.1 m)
- Propulsion: 4 × Combustion Engineering 2-drum boilers; 2 × General Electric geared turbines; 2 shafts
- Speed: 21 knots (39 km/h; 24 mph)
- Capacity: 19 × LVTs or 29 × DUKWs
- Troops: 122 officers, 1236 enlisted men
- Complement: 458 officers and enlisted men
- Armament: 2 × single 5"/38 caliber gun mounts (forward); 1 × twin 5"/38 caliber gun mount (aft); 4 × twin 40 mm guns; 20 × single 20 mm guns

USS Osage (AN-3/AP-108/LSV-3/MCS-3) was the lead ship of her class of vehicle landing ship built for the United States Navy during World War II. She was named after USS Osage, an "old monitor of the navy".

Laid down as netlayer AN-3 on 1 June 1942 at Pascagoula, Mississippi by the Ingalls Shipbuilding Corporation; redesignated as a transport, AP-108, on 1 May 1943; launched on 1 December 1943; sponsored by Mrs. Dorothy K. McHenry, wife of Lt. John A. McHenry, Officer in Charge of Construction (for both U.S. Navy and Maritime Commission vessels), Pascagoula; redesignated as a vehicle landing ship, LSV-3, 21 April 1944; and commissioned on 30 December 1944.

There is no clear record of the period from the launch of the ship till her commissioning but at some point in time during that period, the ship departed her builder's yard and was transferred to the Tampa Shipbuilding Company to be completed

== Service history ==
=== February–April 1945 ===
Following shakedown out of Galveston, Texas Osage embarked 703 officers and men of Casual Draft 2610 of the 126th Naval Construction Battalion and loaded 29 amphibian trucks (DUKW) at New Orleans. Transiting the Panama Canal on 8 February 1945 she continued on to Pearl Harbor for further amphibious training, conducted off Maui. On 17 March she sailed with vehicles and various units of the 10th Army units embarked, in company with attack transport Lauderdale and the submarine chasers PC-492 and PC-594. At Ulithi she joined Task Force 51 and continued on to Okinawa, arriving on 11 April. Despite repeated enemy air attacks, during which she frequently interrupted unloading operations to go to general quarters, laying smoke each night and opening fire as necessary to drive off Japanese planes when in range, Osage completed offloading within five days and on 16 April sailed for Saipan for provisioning, proceeding in company with Montauk.

=== April–August 1945 ===
Moving then to Peleliu, in the Palaus, she reached that place on 28 April 1945. She stood out the following day for Guam, Marianas Islands, and steamed unaccompanied, loaded with tank landing vehicles (LVTs) of the 726th Amphibious Tractor Battalion, and marines of the 4th Anti-Aircraft Battalion, USMC. Reaching her destination on 1 May, Osage unloaded trucks and disembarked troops, and after fueling and provisioning sailed from Apra Harbor to return to Saipan, arriving on 4 May, where she launched the remaining vehicles via her stern ramp, and began a period of post-voyage repairs to her main and auxiliary engines. For a little over a month, Osage awaited orders at Saipan, painting ship and conducting inspections and training, after which time she received orders to proceed to Nouméa, New Caledonia. Sailing on 6 June, the ship crossed the equator on 10 June at approximately 164º0' E, observing the event with appropriate ceremonies, during which time some 400 "pollywogs" received initiation into the realm of "King Neptune." Arriving at her destination on 15 June 1945 Osage received engine repairs at Nouméa, culminating in trials on 25 June, then embarked the men and loaded the vehicles and equipment of the 47th Naval Construction Battalion, taking departure for Guam on 6 July. Unloaded and ready for sea four days later, she departed Guam on 11 July, and after a brief pause at Saipan to load supplies, pushed on for San Francisco, reaching her destination on 25 July for voyage repairs at the Kaiser yard at Richmond, California. During that period of yard work, that coincided with the cessation of hostilities with Japan, she received repairs to her engines, a drydocking, general repairs, and a revision of her paint scheme from "green and black camouflage to over-all gray." She was ultimately reported "ready for sea" on 22 August.

=== August–October 1945 ===
Five days later, on 27 August 1945, with approximately 1,400 officers and enlisted men (United States Army) embarked, replacements for troops in the forward areas, Osage sailed for Ulithi, in the Western Carolines, arriving there on 10 September where she refueled, then continued her voyage to the Philippines, reaching Tacloban two days later to disembark almost half of her embarked soldiers. Underway for Manila on 14 September, the ship reached her destination two days later to disembark the balance of her passengers. Sailing on 21 September with nine officers and 496 enlisted infantry, field artillery, engineering, signal, quartermaster and chemical warfare division passengers, she reached Batangas later the same day, where she loaded 61 army vehicles. Having completed her work in the Philippines, Osage sailed for Japan in company with the attack cargo ship Betelgeuse and attack transport Oconto, the trio later joining with Task Group 34.8 to comprise a convoy of 23 ships and two escorts. The ship arrived in Tokyo Bay on 3 October, to discharge her passengers and cargo at Yokohama. Ordered thence to perform "Magic Carpet" duty, transporting veterans back to the United States, Osage sailed for Okinawa on 7 October. Receiving typhoon warnings while en route, the ship steered courses and speeds designed to evade the bad weather, and stood in to Buckner Bay on 11 October, where she embarked some 75 officers and over 1,600 enlisted men on 13 October for transportation to San Francisco and release from the naval service. She sailed for the west coast the same day.

=== October 1945 – June 1946 ===
Osage arrived at her destination on 26 October 1945 but would soon be underway on a return voyage to the Far East on 10 November. Calling first at Shanghai, China and then Buckner Bay, the ship returned to the West Coast immediately thereafter. Then, following a period of repairs at Portland that ended in mid-January 1946, the ship remained at San Pedro until 1 May, when she sailed for Panama. Although she had been earmarked for conversion to a net cargo ship, she remained a vehicle cargo ship due to the selection of Montauk for the change. After transiting the Panama Canal (9 to 12 May), Osage shed her port propeller on 12 May. She then put into New Orleans (16 May to 9 June), then moved to Mobile for overhaul, the availability of funds dictating when urgent repairs could be accomplished.

=== Decommissioning and sale, 1947–1975 ===
Osage was towed to Orange, Texas by Undaunted, where she was inactivated and placed out of commission, in reserve on 16 May 1947. Redesignated as a mine warfare command and support ship, MCS-3, effective 18 October 1956, in anticipation of a conversion under project SCB 123, Osage remained in reserve until delivered to the custody of the National Defense Reserve Fleet at Beaumont, Texas on 19 September 1960. Stricken from the Naval Vessel Register on 1 September 1961 the ship was delivered to the Maritime Administration, on permanent transfer, on 1 September 1962. Returned to the Navy for stripping on 8 November 1972 incident to her future disposal, she was returned to the Maritime Administration on 27 November 1973. Sold to Luria Brothers and Company, Inc. of Cleveland, Ohio on 11 December 1974, the ship was delivered to her purchasers on 6 January 1975 to be broken up.

Osage received one battle star for service in World War II.

== See also ==
- Net laying ship § 1930s
