= Paul Matthews (musician) =

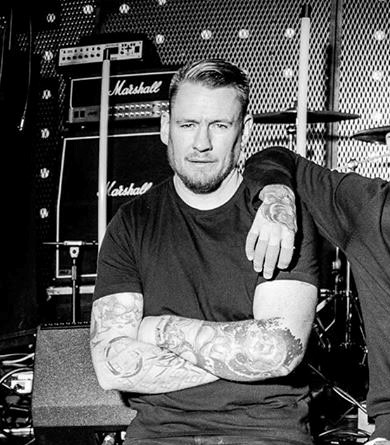
- Paul Matthews 2017

Background information
- Born: 24 October 1978 (age 47); High Wycombe, England
- Genres: Rock; Alternative Rock; EDM; Hard rock Drum and Bass
- Occupations: Songwriter, musician, producer
- Instruments: Bass guitar, Lead Guitar, Backing vocals
- Years active: 1997–present
- Labels: Sony, Plastic Head (UK), Kobalt Music Group
- Website: www.paulmatthewsmusicproductions.com

Paul Michael Matthews (born 24 October 1978) is a New Zealand musician, songwriter, and record producer based in London (UK). He co-founded I Am Giant in 2008 and is the band's bass guitarist and songwriter. He was also the bass guitarist for New Zealand bands Stylus and Tadpole. Matthews also began producing records in 2002 with Blindspott's Self-titled Triple Platinum debut album. Matthews has since produced music for Six 60, Opshop and Setting Fire to Stacey among others.

== Life and career ==
=== Early life ===
He was born in England, and his family moved to New Zealand when he was 2 1/2 years old. Matthews attended Rutherford High School (Now known as Rutherford College). It was here that Matthews began playing bass in a high school band called Rigmarole which would later evolve into the band Stylus.

Matthews studied Audio Engineering at SAE Institute and Contemporary Music Performance at Music and Audio Institute of New Zealand (MAINZ)

=== Stylus ===
Stylus was born from Matthews' high school band Rigmarole. In 1999 Rigmarole won an opportunity to record a single during a local Rockquest competition, the song So What was recorded at Auckland's Revolver studios and went on to get play-listed on The Rock and student radio throughout New Zealand. At the start of 2000 Stylus went on hiatus leading to Matthews joining fellow Auckland rock band Tadpole

=== Tadpole ===
In 2000 with Stylus going into Hiatus, Matthews joined Tadpole as bass guitarist. Tadpole had already released songs on New Zealand radio when Matthews joined the band. Tadpole released their debut album The Buddhafinger in mid-2000 which immediately debuted at #2 on the New Zealand Charts eventually going double platinum.

After touring with the band for two years Matthews left Tadpole to return to former band Stylus.

=== Stylus Return ===
Near the end of 2001 members of Stylus began writing new material, Matthews left Tadpole at the beginning of 2002 to concentrate solely on Stylus. Stylus released their debut album Painkillers in October 2003 which received rave reviews. Stylus toured with Alien Ant Farm and Blindspott during this time before releasing their sophomore album Gain Control in 2006 produced by Matthews and Stylus drummer Dave Rhodes. 2007 would bring about the end of Stylus. Matthews relocated to London with former Blindspott drummer Shelton Woolright.

=== I Am Giant ===
In 2008 Matthews as bass guitarist alongside Woolright on Drums formed I Am Giant. I Am Giant's first two albums with singer Edward Martin charted at #2 in the New Zealand Music Charts. I Am Giant ultimately would call it quits in 2018 after releasing third album Life In Captivity with their third singer, long time guitarist Aja Timu.

=== Other works ===
Matthews Produced, engineered and co-wrote New Zealand Idol (season 1) runner-up Michael Murphy's #1 Single "So Damn Beautiful" from his 2004 album No Place to Land

In 2010 Matthews alongside Shelton Woolright produced Six60 debut single Rise Up 2.0 It reached number 1 on the New Zealand Singles Chart and has been certified 2× platinum.

Matthews co-wrote "Arms" (2018) & "Aurora" (2020) the fourth & fifth studios album's from German post-hardcore band Annisokay

== Discography ==
=== As Musician ===
==== Tadpole ====
- The Buddhafinger (2000)
- The Medusa (2002)

==== Stylus ====
- Pain Killers (2003)
- Gain Control (2006)

==== I Am Giant ====
- The Horrifying Truth (2011)
- Science & Survival (2014)
- Life In Captivity (2018)

=== As producer ===
- Tadpole - The Buddhafinger (2000)
- Blindspott - Blindspott (2002)
- Mighty Scoop - Sunny Daze (2002 EP)
- Tadpole - The Medusa (2002)
- Foamy Ed - A Moments Need (2002 EP)
- Stylus - Painkillers (2003)
- Opshop - You Are Here EP (2004)
- Michael Murphy - No Place To Land (2004)
- Stylus - Gain Control (2006)
- Redline - Trapped Inside (2007)
- Just 1 Fix - The Price of Sellvation (2007)
- Take The Willing - Fight Music (2008)
- Taye Williams - Turn It Up (Single) (2008)
- Plastic Soup - King Of The Train EP (2009)
- I Am Giant - City Limits EP (2010)
- Six60 Rise Up 2.0 Single (2010)
- Setting Fire To Stacey - Love & War (2015 EP)
