= Broken Machine =

Broken Machine may refer to:

- Broken Machine (album), a 2017 album by Nothing but Thieves, or its title track
- "Broken Machine" (song), a 2010 song by Zowie
- "Broken Machine", a 1997 song by Steve Lukather from Luke
- "Broken Machine", a 2000 song by The Almighty from The Almighty
- "Broken Machine", a 2007 song by Electric Six from I Shall Exterminate Everything Around Me That Restricts Me from Being the Master
- Broken Machine, a rock band formed by Spencer Breslin
- A Broken Machine, a 1997 album by Crow
