= Fazerdaze =

New Zealand musician

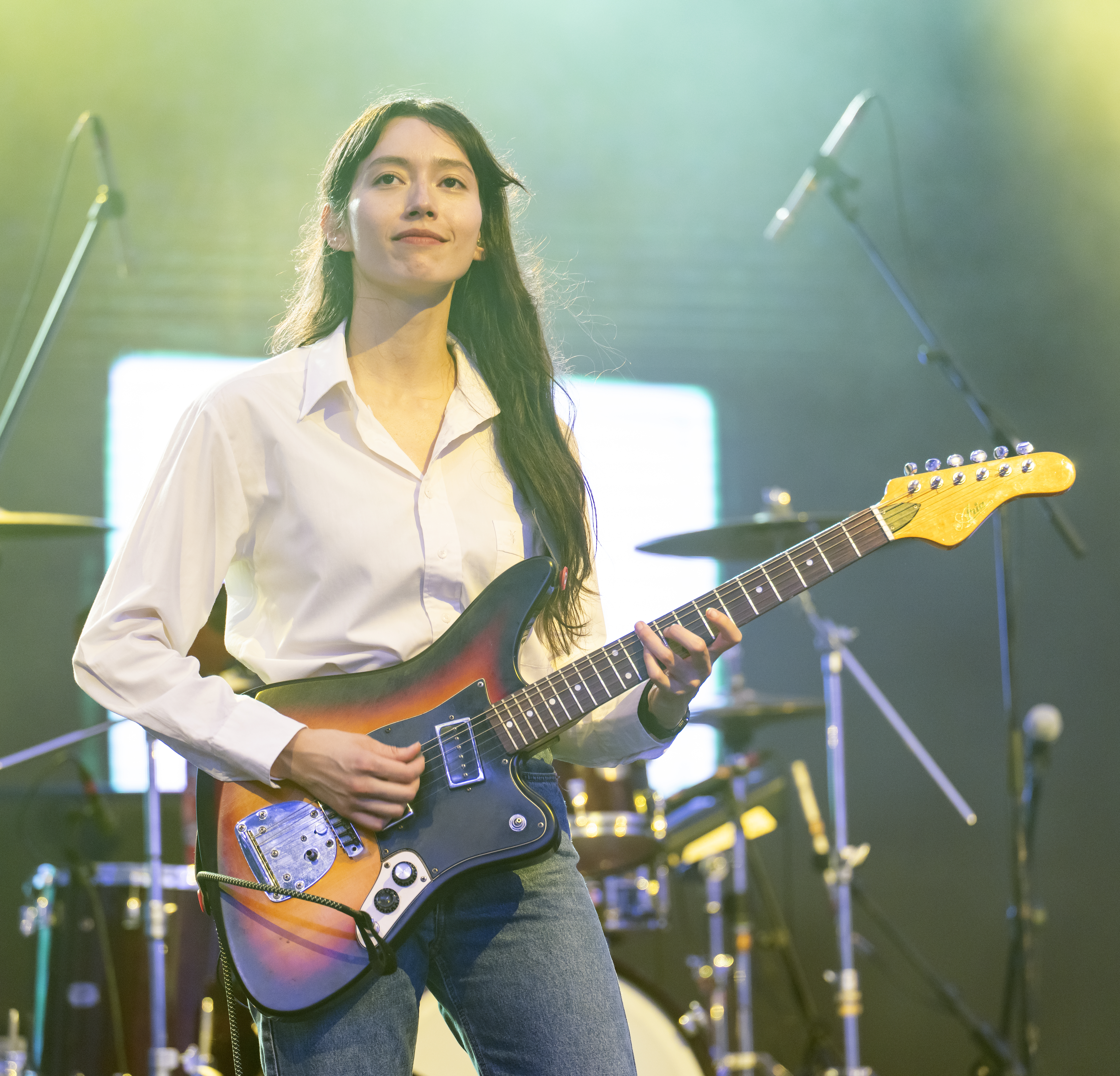
- Murray performing in Singapore at the Trifecta Music Festival in 2023

Background information
- Born: Amelia Rahayu Murray; January 19, 1993 (age 33); Wellington, New Zealand
- Genres: Dream pop, shoegaze, indie pop, indie rock
- Instruments: Vocals; guitar; bass guitar; keyboards
- Years active: 2014–present
- Labels: Flying Nun, section1, Buttrfly Records
- Website: fazerdaze.com

Amelia Rahayu Murray (born 19 January 1993) is a New Zealand singer-songwriter, producer, and multi-instrumentalist. She is best known for her musical project Fazerdaze.

Murray first gained acclaim in 2014 for Fazerdaze's self-titled debut EP. She gained further recognition in 2017 after releasing her debut album, Morningside. Its single, "Lucky Girl", became a viral hit. Following a period of burnout and personal challenges, she took a break from the music industry for several years and returned in late 2022 with Fazerdaze's second EP, Break!. Her second album, Soft Power was released on 15 November 2024 and received critical acclaim.

Fazerdaze's music is best known for its intimate, introspective lyrics and dreamy echo-laden production. Some of the genres associated with the project are dream pop, shoegaze and alternative rock.

== Early life ==
Murray was born in 1993 to an English-born New Zealand father and an Indonesian mother. She is the youngest of three siblings, and was raised in New Zealand's capital city, Wellington. Her interest in playing music began when she played her father's guitar at age 13. During her time at Onslow College, a Wellington high school with a vibrant music scene, she formed a band with her friends called The Tangle. The band eventually dissolved after they graduated from high school. Following the footsteps of renowned Kiwi-Asian artist Bic Runga, Murray then made the decision to pursue music as her career and moved to Auckland to study pop music at University of Auckland.

== Career ==
=== Fazerdaze EP: 2014–2016 ===
While attending university, Murray went to as many gigs as possible, and worked at the Flying Nun record store and NZ Musician magazine. During this time, she adopted the Fazerdaze moniker and began self-recording and self-releasing her own music. She performed at an open mic night that she did not realise was a competition, and won the chance to open for New Zealand indie pop band Goodshirt, where she met band member Gareth Thomas who she went on to collaborate with. Soon after, she recorded her self-titled debut EP in her bedroom studio in Auckland, with mixing assistance from Jonathan Pearce of The Beths. She self-released the EP in October 2014 and it received positive reviews. The EP's genre is described as bedroom pop. Upon the EP's release, Murray began playing at local shows by herself with backing tracks. Eventually, she met fellow New Zealand musicians and expanded Fazerdaze's live act into a full band with auxiliary members accompanying her. Fazerdaze began touring overseas, and opened for other artists' shows, such as Unknown Mortal Orchestra, Matt Corby and Connan Mockasin.

=== Morningside: 2017–2018 ===
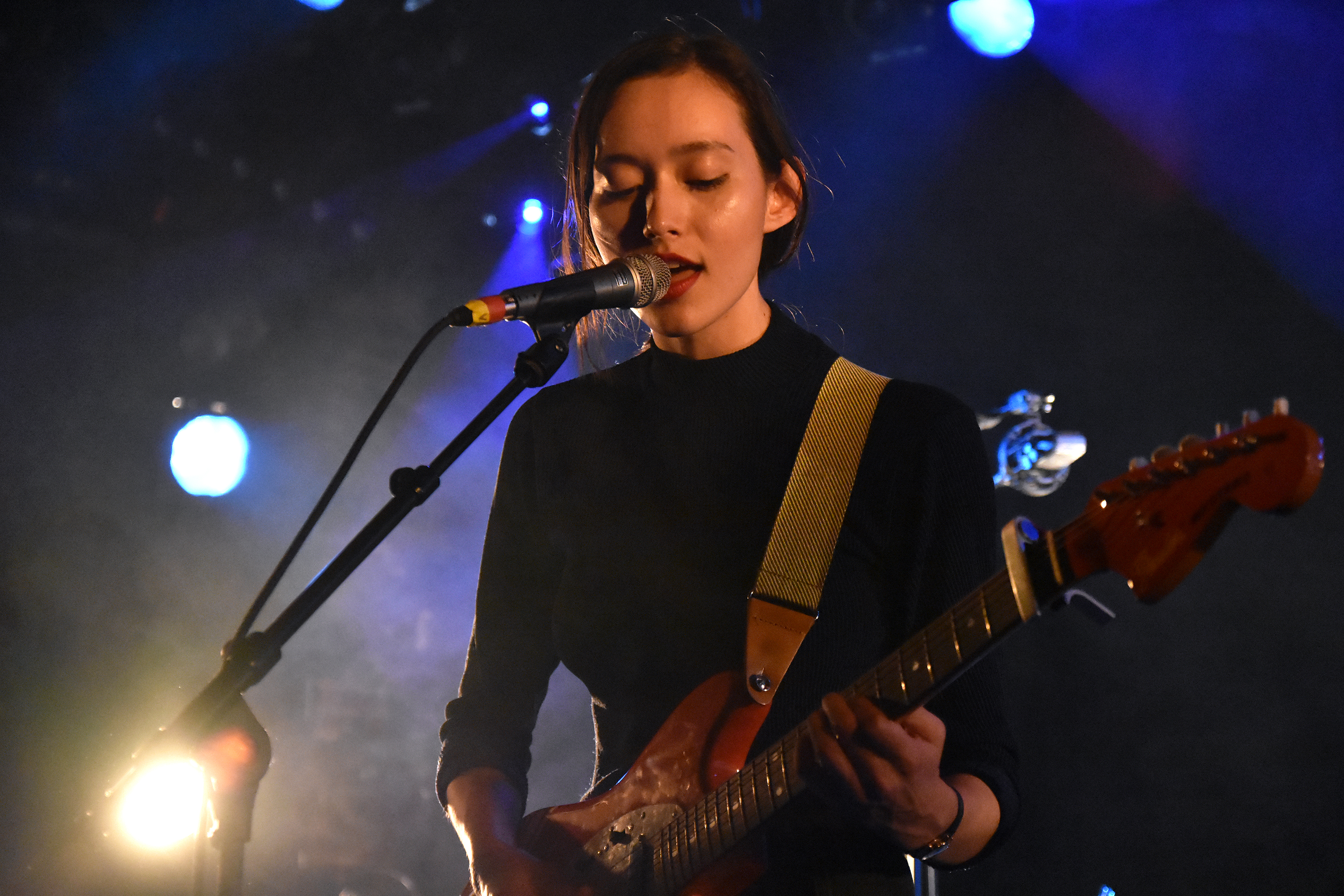
Murray performing at a live concert in France in May 2017

On 5 May 2017, Murray released Fazerdaze's debut album, Morningside. The album was named after the Auckland neighborhood of the same name where she used to live. (Note: Murray currently resides in Christchurch.) Morningside became a hit album with its viral single "Lucky Girl" that Murray wrote with Thomas. The single's music video was shot and directed by Samuel Kristofski and Murray edited the music video. Like her previous release, the album is also dubbed a bedroom pop record. The album launched Fazerdaze into international acclaim and widespread attention, leading to extensive international tours to support the album throughout 2017 until 2018. Murray experienced burnout from touring and felt pressured to release new music, which led to her hiatus.

=== Break!: 2022–2023 ===
Murray went on a hiatus from the music industry for several years, and she returned in 2022 with Fazerdaze's second EP, Break!. She completed the EP during a three-month long lockdown in New Zealand and stated that her hiatus has been instrumental in helping her return to music. Break! was released on 14 October 2022 and was well received by music critics. Musically, Break! is quite different from her previous work in that it include elements of dance pop and electronica. Fazerdaze appeared as a featured artist in a single by New Zealand rock band Voom, titled "Magic" in November 2022. The band's lead singer, Buzz Moller had contributed his songwriting in Break!. In early 2023, Fazerdaze released "Flood Into" as a standalone single, which had previously been available exclusively on the vinyl version of Break!. In September 2023, Murray released "Bigger", the lead single of her second album, Soft Power, ahead of her late 2023 tour in Australia, the UK, and Europe.

=== Soft Power: 2024–current ===
In May 2024, Fazerdaze was announced as the support act for Australian psychedelic rock band, Pond on their 2024 North American tour which was held from November until early December. On 10 September 2024, Murray announced the release date of Fazerdaze's sophomore album, Soft Power. Along with the announcement, she released "Cherry Pie", written with Thomas and Leroy Clampit. The song became Fazerdaze's first No. 1 hit on the NZ Hot Singles chart. In the following month, she released the third single from the album, titled "A Thousand Years" on 9 October 2024. Just before the album's release, Murray and her bandmate, Dave Rowlands of Clap Clap Riot, commenced on the tour with Pond on 12 November 2024. On 15 November 2024, Soft Power was released and received critical acclaim. The album's fourth and last single, "So Easy" was released with a music video uploaded to YouTube on the same day.

On 22 March 2025, Fazerdaze performed the entirety of Soft Power with older songs during a headlining show at The Powerstation, in Auckland. Fazerdaze won the Best Solo Artist and Album of The Year categories for Soft Power during the 58th Aotearoa Music Awards, which was held on 29 May 2025. This is her first time winning both awards.

== Artistry ==
Murray says she mostly prefers making music by herself, though she wrote and recorded consistently with Gareth Thomas from the first EP, Morningside Album, Break EP and the Softpower album. She has collaborated with other artists such as Moller and Runga, producers Aaron Short, Simon Gooding, and Emily Wheatcroft-Snape. Some of the musical genres linked to Fazerdaze are dream pop, bedroom pop, indie pop, alternative rock, indie rock and shoegaze. Murray's musical influences include alternative rock bands, such as Pixies, Blur and Nirvana.

== Session band members (live) ==
=== Current ===
Per Marty Duda; also adapted from Break! and Soft Power liner notes.

- Amelia Murray – lead vocals and guitar (2014–present)
- Dave Rowlands – guitar, keyboards, backing vocals (2022–present)
- Kathleen Tomacruz – bass guitar, backing vocals (2022–present)
- Oliver O'Loughlin – drums (2017–2018; 2022–present)

=== Former ===
According to Gareth Shute, David Farrier and Andy Hazel.

- Gareth Thomas – bass guitar (2014–2021)
- Andrea Holmes – drums (2014–2015)
- Mark Perkins – guitar, keyboards (2015–2017)
- Elliot Francis – drums (2015–2017)
- Benjamin Locke – bass guitar (2015–2017)
- Guy Cowan – bass guitar (2017–2018)
- Benjamin Tindall – guitar, keyboards (2017–2018)
- Carla Camilleri – keyboards, backing vocals (2022–2024)
- Indira Force – keyboards, backing vocals (2022)

== Discography ==
=== Studio albums ===
Title	Album details	Peak chart positions
Title	Album details	NZ
Morningside	Released: 5 May 2017; Label: Flying Nun; Format: LP, CD, digital download, streaming	23
Soft Power	Released: 15 November 2024; Label: Buttrfly Records (AU/NZ), section1 (ROW); Format: LP, CD, cassette, digital download, streaming	12

=== Extended plays ===
Title	EP details	Peak chart positions
Title	EP details	NZ
Fazerdaze EP	Released: 20 October 2014; Label: Self-released; Format: Digital download, streaming	—
Break!	Released: 14 October 2022; Label: section1, Flying Nun; Format: LP, digital download, streaming	24

=== Singles ===
Title	Year	Peak chart positions		Album
Title	Year	NZ Artist	NZ	Album
"Little Uneasy"	2015	—	—	Morningside
"Lucky Girl"	2017	—	—	Morningside
"Take It Slow"	2017	—	—	Morningside
"Come Apart"	2022	6	—	Break!
"Break!"	2022	12	—	Break!
"Flood Into"	2023	18	—	Break!
"Bigger"	2023	11	—	Soft Power
"Cherry Pie"	2024	1	37	Soft Power
"A Thousand Years"	2024	—	—	Soft Power
"So Easy"	2024	7	—	Soft Power
"Motorway"	2025	—	—	
"—" denotes a recording that did not chart or was not released in that territory.

=== Collaborations ===
- Aporia ft. Fazerdaze - "First Nail In The Coffin" (2018)
- Eyedress ft. Fazerdaze - "Window Eyes" (2018)
- Sparrows ft. Fazerdaze - "Gold in the Tide" (2019)
- The Phoenix Foundation - "Beside Yourself (with Fazerdaze)" (2021)
- Voom ft. Fazerdaze - "Magic" (2022)
