= Vampires (Dukes song) =

Single by Dukes

from the album Still Life
- Released: 26 June 2009 (digital)
- Genre: Rock, pop
- Length: 3:23
- Label: Play Nicely
- Songwriter: Matt Barus

Dukes singles chronology
"Time Is A Train" (2008)	"Vampires" (2009)	"Self Control" (2010)

"Vampires" is a pop/rock track by New Zealand rock band the Dukes. It's the first single to be taken from the Dukes forthcoming sophomore LP "Still Life", after the band decided against including their two previous singles on this release.

== Song information ==
"Vampires" was originally released as a digital download single on June 26, 2009 and then re-released online January 24, 2010.

The song was nominated at the APRA Silver Scroll Awards for New Zealand’s most prestigious songwriting award.

"Vampires" was performed live on the TV3 New Zealand 2009 Telethon "The Big Night In" on August 8, 2009.

An acoustic version of "Vampires" was included on their first acoustic EP, "Settle Down - Acoustic EP".

== Music video ==
The music video was produced by Fish 'n' Clips and shot by director James Solomon in mid-2009.

The video contains scenes of all members of the group throughout the clip reenacting various wounding horror scenes. The group are seen being wounded by various instruments with the blood being replaced by various summer fruits and vegetables and there is even a connection to "vampires" with various shots of the group singing with "blood" dripping from their mouths.

On New Zealand music video channels the video proved to be a Top 20 hit across the board, peaking at #4 on MTV NZ's Top 20, #13 on the Juice TV Top 20 Video Chart and #19 on the C4 Top 20 Video Chart.

At the 2010 Juice TV Awards "Vampires" was nominated and went on to win the award for the Video of the Year.

== Chart performance ==
"Vampires" became the Dukes first release to officially chart New Zealand, debuting at #32 on the RIANZ New Zealand Singles Chart. The song has gone on to be their first Top 10 hit charting at #9 on April 26, 2010.

On Monday May 23, 2010 "Vampires" was certified Gold in New Zealand after selling more than 7,500 units. It spent 16 weeks within the Top 40 last charting at #36 July 5, 2010.

Chart (NZ) (2010)	Peak position
RIANZ Singles Chart	9
RadioScope NZ40 Chart	5
RadioScope100	16
iTunes Top 100 Singles	4

=== Certifications ===
Country	Certification (sales thresholds)
New Zealand	Gold
