= Love Demolition =

Studio album by Zowie
- Released: May 11, 2012
- Genre: Pop, electro, punk
- Label: Sony BMG

Love Demolition is the debut album from New Zealand drummer, singer, song writer Zowie, (Zoe Fleury) released on May 11, 2012. Popjustice named Love Demolition one of the best albums of 2012.

== Track listing ==
1. "Love Demolition" (Zoe Fleury, L. Groves)
2. "You Treat Me (Like I'm Software)" (Fleury, Groves)
3. "Smash It" (Fleury, Harry)
4. "My Calculator" (Fleury, H. Jonback)
5. "Nothing Else" (Fleury, J. Quant)
6. "The Bang Bangs" (Fleury, Jonback)
7. "King of One Thing" (Fleury, Groves)
8. "Zip It Up" (Fleury, J. Severin, D.Lennevald)
9. "Anodyne" (Fleury, L. Howe, H. Robinson)
10. "Ping Ping" (Fleury, A. Kronlund, The Struts)
11. "Nasty Fun" (Fleury, T. Anderson)
12. "Idiotize" (Fleury, Quant)

Bonus tracks NZ

1. "Broken Machine" (Fleury, J. Pilbrow)
2. "Love or Hate" Feat: Sebastien Grainger (Death From Above 1979) (Fleury, S. Grainger)
3. "Bite Back" (Fleury, Anderson)
4. "Sugar Cone" (Fleury, T. Meredith, S. Soloman)

== Charts ==
Chart (2012)	Peak position
New Zealand Albums Chart	31

== Singles ==
"Broken Machine" was released as the first single from the album back in 2010. "Bite Back" was the next single released. "Smash It" was the third single, and the most internationally acclaimed. The latest single "My Calculator" is the fourth and final single so far to be released.
