= Still Life (Dukes album) =

Studio album by Dukes
- Released: November 8, 2010
- Recorded: 2007–2010
- Genre: Rock
- Length: 40:27
- Label: Play Nicely
- Producers: Godfrey De Grut, Andrew Buckton & Dukes

Dukes chronology
Lil Sunshine (2005)	Still Life (2010)

Singles from Still Life
- 1. "Vampires" Released: June 26, 2009; 2. "Self Control" Released: February 14, 2010; 3. "Time is a Train" Released: November 1, 2010

Still Life is the second album of rock band Dukes, and was released on November 8, 2010, through Play Nicely. The album features three singles, the gold NZ Top 10 hit "Vampires", "Self Control" and "Time is a Train".

== Background ==
The album was recorded at York St Studios & Studio 203 in Auckland, New Zealand. It was produced by Godfrey De Grut, Andrew Buckton & Dukes and engineered and mixed by Andrew Buckton. All songs were written by lead singer Matt Barus.

== Singles ==
- 'Vampires": In June 2009, the first single to be lifted off the album was released. The single performed well on the radio and television debuting on the New Zealand Singles Chart at #32. It peaked at #9 on the chart and was certified Gold (7,500 units).
- "Self Control": In February 2010, the album's second single was released.
- "Time is a Train": In November 2010, the new album version of "Time is a Train" was released as the album's third single.

== Track listing ==
1. "Time is a Train" - 2:59
2. "Where You Go" - 4:06
3. "Self Control" - 3:16
4. "Do You Listen" - 3:10
5. "Ooh Ooh" - 2:35
6. "Vampires" - 3:23
7. "Secrets" - 3:18
8. "One Way Ticket" - 3:44
9. "If I Have No Heart" - 3:46
10. "Little Brat" - 2:56
11. "Paper Heart" - 3:46
12. "Come Clean" - 3:28

== Chart performance ==
Chart (2010)	Peak position
New Zealand Albums Chart	26
