= DDub =

New Zealand band

dDub
- Origin: Auckland, New Zealand
- Genres: Dub, jazz, ska, reggae, roots
- Years active: 2003–present
- Labels: Vunderchick Records
- Members: Derek Browne; Matt Shanks; Chris Grant; Steve Fulford; Andrew Hall
- Past members: Tala Ofamooni; Duncan Taylor; Ben Campbell; Tim Atkinson
- Website: Official site

dDub is a band from New Zealand. Their style is rock-roots, reggae, soul-ska, and dub. They have played numerous outdoor festivals in New Zealand, including Splore, Queenstown Winter Festival, Soundsplash and Rhythm & Vines.

== Band members ==
- David Hodkinson – Bass
- Chris Grant – Drums/Backing Vocals
- Anthony Hunt – Keyboards
- Andrew Hall – Sax//Backing Vocals
- Neil Cording – Trumpet
- Mike Young – Trombone
- Dixon Nacey – Guitar

Former members

- Derek Wayne (D. W.) Browne – Lead Vocals/Guitar
- Steve Fulford – Guitar/Backing Vocals
- Matt Shanks – Bass/Backing Vocals
- Tala Ofamooni – Drums
- Duncan Taylor – Trombone
- Ben Campbell – Sax/Flute
- Tim Atkinson – Sax
- Finn Scoles – trumpet
- Jono Tan – trombone
- Christian Olliff - Drums
- Brent Strathdee - Bass
- James Topliss - Gongas/ Bongos/ Backing Vocals

== Discography ==
dDub has released one tour EP, two studio albums, and several singles, including "The Closer You Get, The Bigger I Look," a track written specifically for a project to raise awareness and understanding of dyslexia, released to celebrate Dyslexia Action Week 2009. Their songs have appeared on compilation albums in New Zealand as well. They are currently working on a third studio album, recently releasing the new single, "We Are The Ones" in December 2009.

Studio albums

- 2003: Limited Edition Winter Tour EP
- 2006: Awake At Dawn
- 2008: Medicine Man
- 2012: Natural Selection

== Death of Derek Browne ==
The lead vocalist Derek Browne died on 23 April 2019 after a six-month battle with prostate cancer. Prior to the diagnosis he had been able to climb trees for his work as an arborist. By the time he visited the doctor, he had fully developed stage 4 of the tumor. He was given the choice to undergo chemotherapy or to simply wait until his passing.
