= Sunken Water =

Studio album by Pluto
- Released: 22 October 2007
- Recorded: 2007
- Genre: Rock Alternative pop
- Label: Slow Rodriguez Records/EMI

Pluto chronology
Pipeline Under the Ocean (2005)	Sunken Water (2007)

Singles from Sunken Water
- 1. "French Grave" Released: 2007

Sunken Water is the third studio album by New Zealand rock band Pluto, released on 22 October 2007. It is the follow-up to the double platinum Pipeline Under the Ocean.

== Track listing ==
1. French Grave
2. Forgiveness
3. Waiting Watching
4. Rat-A-Tat
5. Nineteen Sixty Three
6. The Soul Is A Whore
7. Polaroid Girl
8. Decisions Decisions
9. Chemistry
10. The Volunteer
11. When The Water Sinks
12. Night Light
13. Cul De Sac (iTunes bonus track)
