= Polysaturated =

Studio album by Nesian Mystik
- Released: November 2002
- Genre: Hip-hop
- Label: Bounce Records

Nesian Mystik chronology
| Polysaturated (2002) | Freshmen (2006) |

Polysaturated is the debut album released by New Zealand hip-hop group, Nesian Mystik, in 2002. The album entered the New Zealand charts at number one, and was certified gold by the end of the first week of sales.

The song "For the People" was used in a Coca-Cola advertisement in New Zealand in 2003.

== Track listing ==
1. "Introduction"
2. "A Brief Reflection"
3. "Nesian Style"
4. "Brothaz"
5. "For the People"
6. "Let Me In"
7. "Roots Discussion" featuring J.P. Pulietu
8. "Unity"
9. "Soul Release" featuring Tyna Keelan
10. "It's On"
11. "Interlude"
12. "Operation F.O.B" featuring Che Fu
13. "Hectic"
14. "N.Z.H.I.P.H.O.P."
15. "Lost Visionz"

== Certifications ==
Certifications for Polysaturated
| Region | Certification | Certified units/sales |
|---|---|---|
| New Zealand (RMNZ) | 4× Platinum | 60,000^{‡} |
^{‡} Sales+streaming figures based on certification alone.
