= Freshmen (album) =

Studio album by Nesian Mystik
- Released: May 1, 2006
- Genre: Hip hop
- Length: 64:26
- Label: Bounce Records

Nesian Mystik chronology
Polysaturated (2002)	Freshmen (2006)	Elevator Musiq (2008)

Freshmen is the second album by New Zealand hip-hop group Nesian Mystik, released in 2006. The album entered the New Zealand charts at number 8, and was certified gold by the end of the first week with 7,500 sales.

== Track listing ==
1. "The Arrival"
2. "What's Next"
3. "Common Sense"
4. "Don't Worry"
5. "One Time"
6. "Rhythm"
7. "If It's Cool" (Features J.B from Tyna and J.B)
8. "Gone Did it"
9. "People"
10. "Robbin' Hood Heroes"
11. "Sail Away"
12. "Make Me Sweat"
13. "This Ain't A Love Song" (Features Shiban)
14. "9.2.5"
15. "So Good"
16. "Yours Sincerely"
