= If It's Cool =

Single by Nesian Mystik

from the album Freshmen
- Released: 2006
- Recorded: 2005
- Genre: hip hop

Nesian Mystik singles chronology
"Brothaz" (2005)	"If It's Cool" (2006)	"So Good" (2006)

"If It's Cool" is a single by the New Zealand hip-hop group, Nesian Mystik released in 2006.The song peaked at no.5 on the RIANZ chart. The song uses a sample from The Style Council's "Shout to the Top".

== Track listing ==
1. "If It's Cool" (Radio Mix)
2. "If It's Cool" (A Capella)
3. "If It's Cool"
