= Pipeline Under the Ocean (album) =

Studio album by Pluto
- Released: 7 February 2005
- Genre: Alternative Rock Pop
- Label: Slow Rodriguez Records/EMI

Pluto chronology
Redlight Syndrome (2001)	Pipeline Under the Ocean (2005)	Sunken Water (2007)

Pipeline Under the Ocean is the second studio album by the New Zealand rock band Pluto, released on 7 February 2005. A second version was released in late 2005 with the video clips for the songs "Radio Crimes", "Long White Cross" and "Dance Stamina".

== Track listing ==
1. Radio Crimes
2. Long White Cross
3. Madeline
4. 8 O'Clock
5. Dance Stamina
6. On Your Own
7. Baghdad Boy
8. Moja Rijeka
9. Baby Cruel
10. Rock n Roll
11. Perfectly Evil
12. Broken Hearted

== Special edition bonus videos ==
1. Radio Crimes
2. Long White Cross
3. Dance Stamina
