= Self Control (Dukes song) =

Single by Dukes

from the album 'Still Life'
- Released: 14 February 2010 (digital)
- Genre: Rock, pop
- Length: 3:15
- Label: Play Nicely
- Songwriter(s): Matt Barus

Dukes singles chronology
"Vampires" (2009)	"Self Control" (2010)

"Self Control" is a pop/rock track by New Zealand rock band the Dukes. It is the second single to be taken from the Dukes sophomore LP "Still Life". It will be the follow-up single to their New Zealand Top 10 single "Vampires".

== Song information ==
"Self Control" was released digitally on February 14, 2010 and sent to radio late April 2010 for a wide release in May.

The single was less commercially successful than their previous Top 10 hit. It did prove to have more success though on radio and in video format.

The song featured on the 2009 final episode of New Zealand soap Shortland Street. An acoustic version of "Self Control" was included on their first acoustic EP, "Settle Down - Acoustic EP".

== Music video ==
The video for "Self Control" was shot on locations throughout their local hometown of Christchurch, New Zealand in February 2010. Locations include local beach Taylor's Mistake, Lyttelton Harbour and Cathedral Square. The band along with extras are depicted as "toys" with the video seemingly being filmed "tilt shift miniature effect photography".

After being released online and on television, the video proved to be popular on new New Zealand Music video channel C42 TV, peaking at #13 on the May 9, 2010.

== Chart performance ==
Chart (NZ) (2010)	Peak position
RadioScope NZ40 Airplay Chart	10
RadioScope100	39
