= Juice TV (New Zealand) =

- Country: New Zealand

Programming
- Picture format: 16:9

Ownership
- Owner: Mood Media

History
- Launched: 1994
- Former names: Juice (2011–2015)

Links
- Webcast: Watch live
- Website: http://www.juicetv.live

Juice TV, is a 24-hour music television channel operating from the Rotorua suburb of Glenholme in New Zealand. The channel is available on the Mood platform and apps, channel 25 on Sky Television (since 2 December 2025) and channel 38 on the Freeview streaming app. It also broadcasts 18 hours a day on CH200, Kordia's local channel on Freeview terrestrial.

== History ==
The channel started in 1994 as a platform for new music videos and local DJs. It was a independently owned by the Wrightson family who had previously been shareholders in MAX. Juice originally launched as Juice TV on the Sky Orange channel which aired on Sky's UHF pay TV service (Aldi). In 1997, the channel began broadcasting 24 hours a day. In 1998 Juice TV began broadcasting exclusively on Sky Digital. The following year, the channel became encrypted on Sky's UHF platform (available only in Auckland) until being removed in 2002 due to lack of promotion from Sky and the unsustainable cost of its UHF frequency.

In February 1996, Juice TV presenter Nik Brown interviewed touring musician Jeff Buckley; footage from the interview was later featured in the 2025 documentary It's Never Over, Jeff Buckley.

Hosts have included Clare and Andy P (7–9pm weekdays), Virginie Le Brun (4–7pm weekdays), Haimona Ngata (12–2pm weekdays), Geoffrey Bell (7pm weekdays), Justin Brown, Glenn Paul, Bruce Earwaker, Amber, and Dayna Vawdrey. The station used an automated Omneon Spectrum media server playout system to operate 24 hours a day and was funded by advertising paying no access fees for carriage on SKY's platform. Juice TV was the only station to broadcast in the 16:9 aspect ratio in New Zealand until January 2011. From 2001 to 2011, Juice TV held an annual music video awards ceremony, the Juice TV Awards.

By the late 2010s, Juice TV was among the last remaining locally made music television channels in New Zealand, following the closure of competitors including C4 and its successor The Edge TV.

In 2011, Juice TV ceased broadcasting on the analogue platform. In November 2014, Juice TV rebranded to Juice with a new logo. On 15 May 2015 Juice was replaced by Garage TV, an action and adventure channel, which retained a Juice-branded programme as a half-hour presentation. Garage TV itself ceased over-the-air operations 31 July 2017 to become a streaming service.

In 2020, the Juice TV brand was purchased by Monarch Broadcasting Ltd, a New Zealand music company, which resurrected the TV channel, broadcasting 18 hours a day on CH200, Kordia's local channel on Freeview terrestrial. Subsequently In March 2024, Juice TV was made available as a standalone channel on the Freeview streaming app. On 2 December 2025, the channel returned to Sky, replacing MTV and returning as an independent channel to the platform after ten years.

On 2 December 2025, Juice TV returned to Sky Television on channel 25, alongside a companion channel, J2, on channel 26, replacing MTV Hits and MTV 80s.

== Shows ==
- NZOWN: A weekly music review show featuring the latest happenings in New Zealand's music scene.
- Discover.New.Music: A music video show featuring up and coming new artists and music videos.
- The Line Up: The hottest music video chart in NZ; as chosen by viewers.
- The Squeeze: A weekly video game review show.
- The Metal Bar: Heavy-Metal based music show music videos, news and gossip hosted by Riccardo.
- ZM on Juice: Local radio show ZM features on Juice.
- Transmission: Alternative music show.
- Girl & Boy: Clare & Andy P presenting weeknights; a Top 10 music video focus with humour, general banter and audience interaction.

== See also ==
- Juice TV Awards

== Suggested reading ==
- Philpott, Emma "Motivating The Video Makers", NZ Musician (Vol: 10, No: 8), Auckland, April/May 2003
