= Zowie =

- Also known as: Bionic Pixie
- Born: Zoe Bridey Fleury
- Origin: Auckland, New Zealand
- Genres: Synthpop, new wave, alternative rock
- Occupations: Singer-songwriter, drummer
- Instruments: Vocals, drums, guitar
- Years active: 2007—Present
- Label: Sony

Zoe Bridey Fleury (born 1986 or 1987) better known by her stage name Zowie, is a singer-songwriter and drummer from New Zealand. She formerly performed as Bionic Pixie until 2010, and was also part of the rock duo The Bengal Lights alongside Maeve Munro.

Fleury began performing as Zowie in 2010 preceding the release of her debut single "Broken Machine", which entered the Top 10 on the Official New Zealand Music Chart. Her 2012 debut album, Love Demolition, peaked at number 31 on the New Zealand Top 40 Album chart. Zowie has also toured as an opening act for artists including Katy Perry, The Kills and Peaches.

== Early and personal life ==
Zoe Fleury was born in New Zealand and grew up in Auckland. She is the daughter of musician Johnny Fleury. She began playing drums at the age of 11, and later went to school to study drumming, joining various punk rock bands and experimenting with screamo music and lyrics. She was a student of Northcote College.

== Career ==
=== Career beginnings ===
While studying at the Music and Audio Institute of New Zealand, Zowie formed the punk rock female duo The Bengal Lights with Maeve Munro. The duo recorded an EP but did not release it. After finishing school, Zowie continued to work in the band as well as study the music business by working at Universal Music Group and Warner Music Group. She later began writing her own music under the name Bionic Pixie, a character she created "by accident"; she first performed with the stage name in 2008. She released the electronic song titled "Toss the Coin" and was a performer at the 2009 Big Day Out in Auckland.

=== 2010–2011: Debut as Zowie ===
In January 2010, Zowie signed with Sony Music Australia. On 6 September 2010, Zowie released her debut single, "Broken Machine", produced by Michael Patterson. The single was released exclusively in New Zealand and became a local success, where it peaked at number 9 on the New Zealand Singles Chart. "Broken Machine" spent a total of 12 weeks on the chart. Following the success of the single, blogger Perez Hilton named Zowie "one of the Top 5 Artist to watch for in 2011".

Zowie's second single, "Bite Back", was her first single to be released outside of New Zealand, receiving a digital release in both Australia and the United States in April 2011. It failed to chart in the United States, but spent over 20 weeks on the Australian Dance Chart peaking at number 2.

In March 2011, Zowie toured with Mark Ronson and The Business. In May, she joined Katy Perry on the Australasian leg of her California Dreams Tour, performing 11 shows across Australia and New Zealand.

In anticipation of her debut album, Zowie released her first promotional single, "Smash It", on 16 September 2011. It was featured on the ABC show Pretty Little Liars later that year. In 2013, "Smash It" was also used as the theme song to season 2 of New Zealand comedy show Super City. A music video for the song was released in October 2011, featuring Zowie in various costumes and lighting. Zowie's third official single, "My Calculator", was released on 11 May 2012 in the United Kingdom. She worked on the song with songwriter Henrik Jonback.

=== 2012–present: Love Demolition ===
Zowie developed her debut album, Love Demolition, over a period of two years while traveling. She worked on the project in numerous countries including the United States, Australia, Sweden, England, and New Zealand; several of the album's tracks were recorded in Los Angeles. The album was written in collaboration with numerous songwriters including Jimmy Harry, Henrik Jonback, and Jonas Quant, among others.

Love Demolition was officially released on 11 May 2012 in New Zealand, where it debuted and peaked at number 31 on the Official Top 40 Albums charts for 1 week. It also spent 7 weeks on the Official Top 20 Aotearoa Albums charts, peaking at 7.

== Musical style and image ==
Zowie sometimes designs her own outfits and has been known to perform with different stage personas. Zowie describes these as "characters" and "alter egos", and stated in a 2010 interview that she was "not the girl on stage". She has described her Zowie stage persona as being "from the year 3000", and is inspired by 80s and 90s fashion and anime aesthetics.

Zowie's music has been described as electropop, synth-pop, and "edgy electronica" with a "punk-rock attitude". Her voice has been compared to that of Kesha and Katie White of The Ting Tings. In a 2012 interview, Zowie said that drumming is her "main love" and she tends to start her song-writing process with the beat. She has cited artists such as Nine Inch Nails and Gary Numan as inspirations, as well as the stylistic elements of new wave, synth-pop and rock. On her musical style, Zowie has said she enjoys "industrial" and "super dark" pop elements and wanted Love Demolition to be "dark and pretty."

== Discography ==
=== Studio albums ===
| Title | Album details | Peak chart positions |
| Title | Album details | NZ |
|---|---|---|
| Love Demolition | Released: 11 May 2012; Label: Sony; Format: LP, CD, digital download | 31 |

=== Singles ===
==== Official singles ====
List of singles, with selected chart positions, showing year released and album name
| Title | Year | Peak chart positions | | Certifications (sales threshold) | Album |
| Title | Year | AU Dance | NZ | Certifications (sales threshold) | Album |
|---|---|---|---|---|---|
| "Broken Machine" | 2010 | — | 9 | NZ: Gold | Love Demolition |
| "Bite Back" | 2011 | 2 | — | | Love Demolition |
| "My Calculator" | 2012 | — | — | | Love Demolition |
| "Feel Inside (And Stuff Like That)" Flight of the Conchords charity single | 2012 | — | 1 | NZ: platinum | |
"—" denotes releases that did not chart or were not released in that territory.
