= Queenstown Winter Festival =

Annual festival in New Zealand

Coordinates: 45°01′52″S 168°39′45″E

The Queenstown Winter Festival was an annual event held in and around the alpine New Zealand town of Queenstown. The festival was held annually from 1975 until its cancellation in 2023. It was sometimes referred to as "The Southern Hemisphere's biggest winter party".

Queenstown is a major winter destination, lying close to several of the southern hemisphere's major ski fields, among them The Remarkables, Cardrona, and Coronet Peak. During the 1970s, locals began organising a winter festival close to the beginning of each ski season, starting with a 1975 event organised by musician Peter Doyle and Laurie Wilde, manager of Eichardt's Hotel.

In the years since that time, the festival grew to the point where events spread over ten days each June, and attract over 40,000 people. The main part of the festival was the final four days, with free live entertainment in and around the town. Events at the festival were deliberately aimed at being both fun and unusual. A music and comedy programme was augmented by events ranging from a polar plunge to tug of war on skis. Other events at previous festivals have included New Zealand Ice Hockey League matches and the Peak-to-Peak endurance race. Fireworks and laser light displays were regularly held.

As of 2019, the festival was known as The Real Journeys Queenstown Winter Festival for sponsorship reasons. The festival was important to Queenstown's economy, bringing millions of dollars into the town.

In 2023 it was announced that the festival would not continue due to the unsustainable running costs

In 2025 NZSki announced they would attempt to revive the Winter Festival, starting in 2026 with small key events and growing over time.
