= Tadpole (album) =

Studio album by Tadpole
- Released: May 2, 2006
- Recorded: York St. Studios, 203 Studios
- Genre: Rock
- Length: 54:10
- Label: Benthouse Records
- Producer: Florian Sommer

Tadpole chronology
The Medusa (2002)	Tadpole (2006)

Singles from Tadpole
- 1. "Too Hard"; 2. "Yesterday"; 3. "Offering"

Tadpole is the third and final studio album by New Zealand rock band Tadpole. It was released on May 2, 2006.

This was the last album recorded by the band before they split up. The album's launch party in Auckland was also the band's final live performance.

== Track listing ==
All lyrics are written by Tadpole

No.	Title	Length
1.	"Control"	3:44
2.	"Yesterday"	4:34
3.	"Offering"	4:29
4.	"Too Hard"	3:32
5.	"Blessed"	3:56
6.	"Open Wounds & Bleeding Hearts"	3:25
7.	"The End"	4:25
8.	"Vanity"	2:47
9.	"Pretty"	4:23
10.	"This Broken Heart"	5:35
11.	"Compulsion"	3:03
12.	"Leave a Light On"	4:00
13.	"Glad Eye"	2:55
14.	"Angel Baby"	3:47
Total length:		54:10
