= Nesian Mystik =

New Zealand hip-hop/R&B group

- Origin: Auckland, New Zealand
- Genres: Hip hop, R&B
- Years active: 1999–2011
- Labels: Bounce Records, Arch Dynasty Records, Warner Music New Zealand
- Members: Te Awanui Reeder; Feleti Strickson-Pua; Donald McNulty; Junior Rikiau; David Atai; Heath Manukau
- Website: Nesian Mystik on Facebook

Nesian Mystik was a New Zealand hip-hop/R&B group which formed in 1999. The cultural backgrounds of its members united a remarkable diversity of Polynesia by bringing together Cook Island, Tongan, Samoan and Māori ancestry. As well as producing a record number of Top 10 New Zealand singles, Nesian Mystik supported international acts such as Robbie Williams, Missy Elliott, Shaggy and The Black Eyed Peas. The group officially disbanded in 2011 after a successful music career that included four commercially successful albums and numerous New Zealand Music Award nominations.

== History ==
In 1999, Nesian Mystik was formed in the music room of Auckland's Western Springs College. All members attended the school except Strickson-Pua who attended St Paul's College in Auckland. The band was originally named "Tropical Penguins" to enter a school talent competition. This group, consisting of Te Awanui "Awa" Reeder, Donny "Tha Kid Oldwun" McNulty, Junior "Junz" Rikiau, and David "Dmon Finguz" Atai were joined by Heathdale "Notiq" Manukau and Feleti "Sabre" Strickson-Pua before changing their name to Nesian Mystik in reference to their various diverse Polynesian backgrounds, and the influence of those on their gentle R&B/hip-hop music. The new lineup was more successful, winning the regional section of the Pasifika Beats competition.

=== Polysaturated (2002–2003) ===
In November 2002, the group released their debut album Polysaturated. The album debuted at number 1 on the New Zealand album chart and was certified Gold by the end of its first week of sales. Seven months after release, the album was still in the national top 10 charts and was certified four times Platinum. Polysaturated produced four successful top ten hits including 'Nesian Style', 'It's On', 'For The People' and 'Unity'. The fifth single, 'Brothaz' features on the soundtrack to the Polynesian film Sione's Wedding.

=== Freshmen (2005–2006) ===
November 2005 saw the release of Nesian Mystik's second album Freshmen, which entered the New Zealand Album Charts at number 8 with singles 'What's Next?', 'If It's Cool', "Robin Hood Heroes" and "So Good". Freshmen was certified Gold in the first week of release. Nesian Mystik describe it as "a feel good album, drawing influences from Old Skool, Soul, Funk, R&B and Hip Hop while upping the production sophistication and adding new flavas to the mix."

=== Elevator Musiq (2008–2009) ===
Nesian Mystik released their third album Elevator Musiq on 27 October 2008. The name stems from the idea that a musician has "made it" in the music business if their music is heard in an elevator. The name also reflects the group's drive to continually elevate their music and style to "the next level".

Elevator Musiq produced three top ten hits : "Nesian 101", "Dancefloor" and "Mr Mista" featuring Che Fu, Kimbra and Cydel. "Nesian 101" reached number one on the New Zealand RIANZ Singles Chart and was certified Platinum. "Dancefloor" peaked at number 10. "Mr Mista" was certified Gold and spent 17 weeks on the Top 40 Singles Chart where it peaked at number three. The release of "R.S.V.P.", which reached number 9 on the charts, marked the band's 10th Top Ten single in New Zealand, making them the first New Zealand artist to do so.

=== 99 A.D. (2009 – Present) ===
The band's fourth album, 99 A.D., was released 26 July 2010 from which the first single, "Sacrifice", was released in late 2009. A second single, "Sun Goes Down", peaked at number three on the New Zealand singles chart, their eleventh and final top ten single.

=== Farewell Tour (2011) ===
On 27 July 2010, Nesian Mystik performed live and farewelled fans on Close Up as they prepared to separate. The group's farewell tour included performances at Ragamuffin in February 2011 and the annual Homegrown Festival in March 2011.

Nesian Mystik holds the record for the most number of top-10 singles in the New Zealand singles chart by a New Zealand artist, with their 11 singles beating Crowded House in second place with six singles. Nesian Mystik's 11th top 10 single "Sun Goes Down" reached No.3 in February 2010.

== Awards ==
Aside from enjoying success in sales and radio airplay with their singles, the group collected numerous awards including:

| Year | Nominee / work | Award | Result |
|---|---|---|---|
| 2001 | Nesian Mystik | 2001 Mai Time Awards – Mataariki Award for Most Promising Up and Coming Act | Won |
| 2002 | | 2002 Juice TV Awards – Best Hip-Hop/RnB Video Award | Won |
| 2003 | Nesian Mystik | 2003 NZ Music Awards – Best Urban Group | Won |
| 2003 | Nesian Mystik | 2003 NZ Music Awards – Peoples Choice Award | Won |
| 2003 | "For The People" | 2003 APRA Silver Scroll Award | Won |
| 2003 | | 2003 bNet Awards – Best Hip Hop Release | Won |
| 2003 | | 2003 NZ Entertainment Awards – Album of the Year | Won |
| 2008 | "Nesian 101" | 2008 Juice TV Awards – Juice Hip Hop Music Video Award | Won |
| 2009 | Nesian Mystik | 2009 MTV Australia Awards – Best Kiwi Act | Won |
| 2009 | Nesian Mystik | 2009 Pacific Music Awards – Best Pacific Urban Artist | Won |
| 2009 | Nesian Mystik | 2009 Pacific Music Awards – Best Pacific Group | Won |
| 2009 | Elevator Musiq | 2009 Pacific Music Awards – Pacific Music Album | Won |
| 2009 | "Nesian 101" | 2009 Pacific Music Awards – APRA Best Song | Won |
| 2009 | Nesian Mystik | 2009 Waiata Māori Music Awards – Best Māori Urban Artist | Won |
| 2009 | Nesian Mystik | 2009 Waiata Māori Music Awards – Best Māori Pop Artist | Won |
| 2009 | "Nesian 101" | 2009 Waiata Māori Music Awards – Best Māori Song | Won |
| 2009 | Nesian Mystik | 2009 Waiata Māori Music Awards – Best Māori Songwriter | Won |

== Members ==
- Te Awanui 'Awa' Reeder (vocals)
- Feleti 'Sabre' Strickson-Pua (raps)
- Donny 'Tha Kid Oldwun' McNulty (raps)
- Junior 'Junz' Rikiau (raps, drums, ukulele)
- David 'Dmon' Atai (guitar, vocals)
- Heath 'Notiq' Manukau (turntables).

== Discography ==
Nesian Mystik discography
- Studio albums: 4
- Singles: 15

=== Studio albums ===
| Year | Title | RIANZ | |
| Year | Title | Chart | Certification^{A} |
|---|---|---|---|
| 2002 | Polysaturated: Released: November; Label: Bounce Records | 1 | 4× Platinum |
| 2006 | Freshmen: Released: 1 May; Label: Bounce Records | 8 | Gold |
| 2008 | Elevator Musiq: Released: 27 October; Label: Bounce Records | 12 | Gold |
| 2010 | 99 A.D.: Released: 26 July; Label: Arch Dynasty Records | 4 | Platinum |

=== Singles ===
| Year | Title | RIANZ | | Album |
| Year | Title | Chart | Certification^{A} | Album |
|---|---|---|---|---|
| 2001 | "Nesian Style" | 9 | Gold | Polysaturated |
| 2002 | "It's On" | 2 | Platinum | Polysaturated |
| 2002 | "For the People" | 5 | Gold | Polysaturated |
| 2003 | "Unity" | 7 | Gold | Polysaturated |
| 2003 | "Brothaz" | 13 | | Polysaturated |
| 2005 | "What's Next?" | 7 | Gold | Freshmen |
| 2006 | "If It's Cool" | 5 | Gold | Freshmen |
| 2006 | "So Good" | — | | Freshmen |
| 2006 | "Robbin' Hood Heroes" | — | Gold | Freshmen |
| 2008 | "Nesian 101" | 1 | Platinum | Elevator Musiq |
| 2008 | "Dancefloor" | 10 | | Elevator Musiq |
| 2008 | "Mr Mista" | 3 | Gold | Elevator Musiq |
| 2009 | "R.S.V.P." (featuring PNC) | 9 | | Elevator Musiq |
| 2009 | "Sacrifice" (featuring WISE) | — | | 99 A.D. |
| 2010" | "Sun Goes Down" | 3 | 3× Platinum | 99 A.D. |
| 2010" | "No. 1" | — | | 99 A.D. |
| 2010" | "Fresh Boyz" (featuring Scribe) | — | | 99 A.D. |
"—" denotes title that did not chart

- RIANZ albums and singles certifications:
  - Gold – 7,500 sales
  - Platinum – 15,000 sales
