= Fiji Baby =

Studio album by Goodshirt
- Released: 19 February 2004
- Studio: Cement Studios; The Lab, Auckland
- Genre: Rock, pop
- Length: 37:09
- Label: Cement; EMI Records
- Producer: Murray Fisher; Goodshirt

Goodshirt chronology
E.G. (EP) (2002)	Fiji Baby (2004)

Singles from Fiji Baby
- 1. "Buck it Up" Released: 2003; 2. "Cement" Released: 2004; 3. "Fiji Baby" Released: 2004; 4. "Lucy" Released: 2004

Fiji Baby is the second studio album by New Zealand four piece Goodshirt. The album spawned four singles; "Buck It Up", "Cement", "Fiji Baby" (#25 NZ), and "Lucy".

== Release information ==
- New Zealand: February 2004 - (Cement/EMI)
- Australia: September 2004 - (Cement/EMI)
- Canada: February 2005 - (Cement/EMI)

== Track listing ==
All tracks are written by Goodshirt.

No.	Title	Length
1.	"Not That Far"	4:01
2.	"Sand"	3:41
3.	"Buck it Up"	2:41
4.	"Dumb Day"	3:24
5.	"Cement"	2:37
6.	"My Racing Head"	3:21
7.	"How Will I See You"	3:28
8.	"Cold Body Blues"	4:07
9.	"Lucy"	3:57
10.	"Fall"	2:34
11.	"Fiji Baby"	3:13
Total length:		37:09

== Personnel ==
Credits adapted from the album's liner notes.

Goodshirt

- Rod Fisher – vocals, guitars, synths, percussion/claps
- Gareth Thomas – vocals, bass/lead synths, electric piano, organ, guitar
- Mike Beehre – drums, vocals, percussion/claps
- Murray Fisher – guitars, synths, loops/programming, vocals, percussion/claps

Technical personnel

- Goodshirt - production, art direction, design, artwork and photos
- Murray Fisher – production, engineering (all tracks except "Fall")
- Gareth Thomas – recording (on "Fall")
- Steve Smart – mastering
- Kelvin Soh – artwork
- The Wilderness – art direction and design
- Olli – assistance at The Lab, Auckland

== Charts ==
Chart (2004)	Peak Position
New Zealand Albums (RMNZ)	5
