= The Buddhafinger =

Studio album by Tadpole
- Released: June 1, 2000
- Genre: Rock
- Length: 43:51
- Labels: EMI Music New Zealand; Antenna Recordings
- Producer: Malcolm Welsford

Tadpole chronology
The Buddhafinger (2000)	Nothing New EP (2001)

Singles from The Buddhafinger
- 1. "Blind"; 2. "For Me"; 3. "Backdoor"; 4. "Alright"; 5. "No. 1"; 6. "Better Days"

The Buddhafinger is the debut album by New Zealand rock group, Tadpole, released on June 1, 2000. The album debuted in the Official New Zealand Top 40 Albums chart on August 20, 2000, and peaked at #2. The album spent a total of 44 weeks in the chart.

== Track listing ==
All lyrics are written by Tadpole.

No.	Title	Length
1.	"Intro"	0:30
2.	"Alright"	3:37
3.	"No. 1"	2:12
4.	"Blind"	2:51
5.	"Better Days"	4:10
6.	"For Me"	3:18
7.	"No Man"	3:18
8.	"Set To Fade"	3:52
9.	"Music Box"	5:21
10.	"You Know It"	3:31
11.	"Backdoor"	3:21
12.	"Kindred"	3:53
13.	"White Horsie"	4:08
Total length:		43:51

== Certifications ==
Region	Certification	Certified units/sales
New Zealand (RMNZ)	3× Platinum	45,000^{‡}
^{‡} Sales+streaming figures based on certification alone.
