= Autozamm =

New Zealand rock band

- Origin: New Zealand
- Genres: Rock and Roll, Alternative
- Years active: 2004–present
- Members: Mike Carpinter; Nick Major; Stephen Small; Richard Orr; Oliver Gordon
- Past members: Jasper De Roos; Craig Mason; Ben Litchfield
- Website: www.autozamm.co.nz

Autozamm is a New Zealand rock band from Auckland, that has supported international acts such as the Black Crowes, INXS and Silverchair. The band has appeared at events such as the Big Day Out, Homegrown and Southern Amp.

== Band members ==
- Ollie Gordon (bass)
- Nick Major (lead vocals, guitar)
- Mike Carpinter (guitar, vocals)
- Stephen Small (keyboards, vocals)
- Richard Orr (drums)

== "The Review" controversy ==
In 2010, amateur music blogger Simon Sweetman hit out at Autozamm in a blog post on NZ On Air music funding, describing the group "terrible" and saying "they certainly do little to reflect any distinctly New Zealand culture." In response to this, Autozamm released the single "The Review" in 2012, which hit out at Sweetman and other critics.

== Discography ==
=== Albums ===
Year	Title	Details	Peak chart positions
Year	Title	Details	NZ
2005	As for Now	Released: 8 August 2005; Label: Flaming Pearl Records	—
2008	Drama Queen	Released: 3 March 2008; Label: Hark Records	—
2010	5th Degree	Released: 11 October 2010; Label: Autozamm Music Limited	16
"—" denotes a recording that did not chart or was not released in that territory.

=== EPs ===
Year	Title	Details	Peak chart positions
Year	Title	Details	NZ
2004	A Shade of Brown	Released: 2004; Label: Flaming Pearl Records	—
"—" denotes a recording that did not chart or was not released in that territory.

=== Singles ===
Year	Title	Peak chart positions	Album
Year	Title	NZ	Album
2004	"Unstuck"	—	A Shade of Brown EP
2004	"You Don't Know Me"	—	A Shade of Brown EP
2005	"Down on Me"	—	As For Now
2005	"Sweet Love"	—	As For Now
2005	"Don't Worry"	—	As For Now
2006	"Ways to Run"	—	As For Now
2007	"Killer Shoes"	—	Drama Queen
2008	"Disco"	—	Drama Queen
2008	"Closer to Home"	—	Drama Queen
2009	"Drama Queen"	—	Drama Queen
2009	"Long Days"	—	Drama Queen
2010	"Want It Need It"	—	5th Degree
2010	"Breathe"	—	5th Degree
2011	"Waiting"	—	5th Degree
2012	"The Review"	—	Non-album single
"—" denotes a recording that did not chart or was not released in that territory.
