= Tadpole pupil =

Condition affecting the shape of the pupil

The eye is made up of the sclera, the iris, and the pupil, a black hole located at the center of the eye with the main function of allowing light to pass to the retina. Due to certain muscle spasms in the eye, the pupil can resemble a tadpole, which consists of a circular body, no arms or legs, and a tail.

When the pupil takes on the shape of a tadpole, the condition is called tadpole pupil. Tadpole pupil, also known as episodic segmental iris mydriasis, is an ocular condition where the muscles of the iris begin to spasm, causing the elongation, or lengthening, of parts of the iris. These spasms can affect any segment, or portion, of the iris and involve the iris dilator muscle. Contractions of the iris dilator muscle, a smooth muscle of the eye running radially in the iris, can cause irregular distortion of the pupil, thus making the pupil look tadpole shaped and giving this condition its name. Episodic segmental iris mydriasis was first described and termed "tadpole pupil" in 1912 by HS Thompson.

== Symptoms and signs ==
The primary symptom is pupillary distortion (changing of the size or shape of the pupil). Distortion can occur in any segment of the iris. One part of the iris is pulled to a peak, and then returns to normal after the episode. Other symptoms may include blurred vision, abnormal periocular sensations (unusual feelings around the eyes), migraines, and feelings of a chilled face. Some patients who demonstrate tadpole pupil symptoms also experienced Horner's syndrome or Adie's tonic pupil.

Tadpole pupil symptoms occur in episodes. Episodes are generally brief and less than 5 minutes, however, some episodes have been reported to last anywhere from 3 to 15 minutes. The episodes can occur multiple times a day for days, weeks, or months.

Studies show that a majority of those experiencing tadpole pupil are younger women from an age range of 24 to 48 years old, with no apparent health problems. Although women generally have the tadpole pupil, men are not unaffected by this disease and some have been reported to experience the symptoms.

== Diagnosis ==
Tadpole pupil is diagnosed and characterized by the abnormality of the pupil shape. The pupil can disorient itself in different ways before it returns to its original shape. For example, the pupil may stretch out to a 7 o'clock position, i.e. the pupil points in the same direction the hour hand on a clock would at 7 o'clock.

There are no specific tests or screenings that are performed to diagnose the tadpole pupil because of the briefness and randomness of the episodes. Some tests, however, are recommended by optometrists as part of an eye exam checkup. These tests include pharmacological testing (testing for an effective drug against a specific disease or condition), a complete ocular examination (a test that examines the entire eye), and video pupillography (recording and analysis of spontaneous pupil behavior in darkness). A test for Horner Syndrome is highly recommended to all the patients who have a history of tadpole pupil episodes because studies have linked the two conditions.

=== Common eye examinations for the pupil and internal eye ===
Corneal and Retinal Topography: computerized tests that maps the surface of the retina, or the curvature of the cornea.

Fluorescein Angiogram: evaluation of blood circulation in the retina.

Dilated Pupillary Exam: special drops expand the pupil, which then allows doctors to examine the retina.

Slit-Lamp Exam: By shining a small beam of light in the eye, eye doctors can diagnose cataracts, glaucoma, retinal detachment, macular degeneration, injuries to the cornea, and dry eye disease.

Ultrasound: Provides a picture of the eye's internal structure, and can evaluate ocular tumors, or the retina if its suffering from cataracts or hemorrhages.

== Treatments ==
Since the condition appears to slowly subside or diminish on its own, there are no specific treatments for this condition available.

Some precautions include regular visits to an ophthalmologist or optometrist and general testing of the pupil and internal eye through fundamental examinations (listed below). The examinations can determine if any of the muscles of the eye or retina, which is linked to the pupil, have any problems that could relate to the tadpole pupil condition.
