= The Medusa =

Studio album by Tadpole
- Released: 15 September 2002
- Genre: Rock
- Length: 44:55
- Labels: EMI Music New Zealand; Antenna Recordings
- Producer: Malcolm Welsford

Tadpole chronology
Nothing New EP (2001)	The Medusa (2002)	Tadpole (2006)

Singles from The Medusa
- 1. "Nothing New" Released: 2001; 2. "Now Today Forever" Released: 2002; 3. "Condition Chronic" Released: 2002

The Medusa is the second studio album released by New Zealand rock group, Tadpole on September 15, 2002. It was recorded over late 2001-early 2002 and was produced by Malcolm Welsford via Antenna Recordings.

== Cover art ==
The cover art features Greek mythology's Medusa designed by Geoff Smith at Outer Aspect, with additional artwork by Monique Facon. The 2002 pressings of the album cover were innovative, due to the use of a 3D hologram cover design. To save on costs, the cover from 2003 onward did not have the hologram, instead it included a booklet with lyrics.

== Chart performance ==
The Medusa entered the New Zealand Top 40 Albums chart and peaked at #10 on September 15, 2002. The album spent a total of nine weeks on the chart and became Tadpole's second album to reach the top 10.

== Track listing ==
Track listing adapted from Spotify. All tracks are written by Renée Brennan, Dean Lawton, and Chris Yong.

No.	Title	Length
1.	"Nothing New"	3:49
2.	"Frequency"	3:25
3.	"Just Not Rock 'n' Roll"	2:36
4.	"Everything Comes Around"	3:25
5.	"Condition Chronic"	4:09
6.	"World Without You"	4:22
7.	"Something Real (Na Na Song)"	3:15
8.	"Worn and Weary"	5:32
9.	"Now Today Forever"	4:35
10.	"Too Cruel"	3:12
11.	"Fast Stuff"	2:45
12.	"Always Be Mine"	3:50
Total length:		44:55

== Personnel ==
Personnel are adapted from the album's liner notes and AudioCulture.

=== Tadpole ===
- Renée Brennan – vocals
- Shannon Brown – bass guitar
- Dean "Dino" Lawton – drums
- Chris Yong – guitar

=== Additional personnel ===
- Monique Facon – additional artwork
- Paul Rhodes – musical direction
- Geoff Smith – 3D cover artwork
- Malcolm Welsford – production, engineering

== Charts ==
Chart (2002)	Peak position
New Zealand Albums (RMNZ)	10

== Certifications ==
Region	Certification	Certified units/sales
New Zealand (RMNZ)	Platinum	15,000^{‡}
^{‡} Sales+streaming figures based on certification alone.
