= Elevator Musiq =

Studio album by Nesian Mystik
- Released: 28 October 2008
- Genres: R&B
- Length: 60:46
- Label: Bounce/Universal

Nesian Mystik chronology
Freshmen (2006)	Elevator Musiq (2008)	99 A.D. (2010)

Singles from Elevator Musiq
- 1. "Nesian 101" Released: 9 June 2008; 2. "Dance Floor" Released: 8 September 2008; 3. "Mr Mista" Released: 15 December 2008; 4. "R.S.V.P." Released: 14 May 2009

Elevator Musiq is the third album released by New Zealand hip-hop group, Nesian Mystik on 28 October 2008 by Bounce/Universal Records. Album art work was done by New Zealand Street artist Misery. Guest Artists include PNC, Young Sid and Che Fu.

The album peaked at #12 on the New Zealand Top 40 charts.

== Track listing ==
1. "Can't Stop The Progress"
2. "Home Coming"
3. "Come And Get It"
4. "Damn"
5. "Just Be Me"
6. "Magazine Dreams"
7. "R.S.V.P" ft. PNC
8. "You Already Know" ft Young Sid
9. "I Don't Usually"
10. "Prospect"
11. "Mr Mista"
12. "Break Drop Flow"
13. "Nesian 101"
14. "Dance Floor"
15. "Game Over"

== Singles chart performance ==
Year	Single	New Zealand Top
2008	"Nesian 101"	1
2008	"Dance Floor"	10
2008	"Mr Mista"	3

== Certifications ==
Certifications for Elevator Musiq
Region	Certification	Certified units/sales
New Zealand (RMNZ)	2× Platinum	30,000^{‡}
^{‡} Sales+streaming figures based on certification alone.
