= NZCT Chamber Music Contest =

New Zealand youth music competition

The NZCT Chamber Music Contest (formerly known as the Westpac School Music Contest) is a classical music competition held annually in New Zealand for performers up to 19 years of age who are enrolled full-time at a New Zealand primary or secondary school. Groups of 3–8 students perform a work of up to 15 minutes. There are 4 rounds in the competition consisting of 14 District rounds, 3 Regional rounds, a National Semi-Final and a National Final.

The competition began in 1965 under the directorship of Arthur Hilton and is run by Chamber Music New Zealand. It is the longest-running youth music competition in the country.

== History ==
The contest grew out of conversations between cellist William Pleeth and Arthur Hilton, the director of the Music Federation of New Zealand (now Chamber Music New Zealand). The contest was first held in 1965 and involved 250 students from around the country. It was adjudicated by The Vienna Octet, one of the most prominent international chamber groups of the time, who “expressed pleasure at the quality of the performances”. The finalists received a medal and a long-playing record from the octet.

By 1971, the numbers had grown to 600 students and a composition section was added the following year. A vocal group award was created in 1978 but by 1987 the number of students had become so great that the contest was facing logistical challenges. Over 3000 students were involved by 1984, spread over 6 different sections of the competition. In 1988 the New Zealand Choral Federation began the Secondary Schools’ Choral Festival to encourage and inspire secondary school choral singing and lessen the workload of the Music Federation. The festival is now known as The Big Sing and involves 10,000 students from around New Zealand.

In 1988, the final was televised which helped raise the profile of the contest. In 1990, the winners of the instrumental and composition sections were interviewed on the Sunday morning programme as a part of the contest’s 25th anniversary celebrations. The contest final has been livestreamed, and broadcast by Radio New Zealand since 2015.

The contest celebrated its 50th anniversary in 2015. The Turnovsky Jubilee Ensemble toured New Zealand with Chamber Music New Zealand, made up of professional musicians who participated in the competition while at secondary school.

== Competition ==
The competition consists of 4 rounds. All entrants perform in one of 14 district rounds, held around New Zealand. At the completion of the District Rounds, a total of 12 District groups are selected to play at each of the three Regional Finals in Auckland, Wellington, and Christchurch (36 groups nationwide). The winning group from each district is automatically selected to perform in their Regional Final. 12 groups are then selected from the Regional Round to perform at the National Semi-Final, held in Auckland, Wellington, or Christchurch. The top 6 groups are then selected for the National final, held the following day in the same venue. The contest is held over 2 months from June to August annually.

Students are required to perform a work between 4 and 15 minutes of duration. To reach the National Semi-Final or National Final, multiple movements must be from the same work although this is not required for the District Rounds of the competition. Groups of 3–8 musicians can enter, with no more than one singer and no conductor. Each performer must have an individual part. Students cannot compete in more than 2 groups and groups must compete in the district in which they reside.

=== Adjudicators ===
There are up to 14 adjudicators involved in the instrumental section of the contest. They travel around the country individually to judge District and Regional rounds. There is a separate adjudicator for the composition section. The adjudicating panel generally consists of New Zealand residents, but it has been judged by an international panel before, such as the Doric Quartet in 2014.

=== Original composition section ===
An original Composition Section was added in 1972 to encourage young composers. Students are required to submit a score for a work with a duration of up to 15 minutes, involving 3–8 musicians. There is no limit to the number of entries one person can enter. The works are judged directly from the scores and the winning entry is performed at the National Final of the Chamber Music Contest.

=== Coaching ===
Beginning in 2005, Chamber Music New Zealand was able to offer free coaching sessions to groups entered in the competition, with funding granted by the Stout Trust. The Associated Board of the Royal Schools of Music has funded the coaching program since 2010. Coaching is mainly offered to groups outside of the main centres in recognition of the greater availability of high-level coaching in Auckland, Wellington, and Christchurch. Professional musicians are contracted to travel around secondary schools and coach the students on their chosen work in preparation for the contest. From 2007, coaching has also been offered to composition students.

=== Aim ===
From the beginning, the contest has “gone beyond medals and prizes”. It has been credited with inspiring generations of musicians to pursue a music career. A large proportion of New Zealand’s professional musicians participated in the contest while at school and many of these have gone on to tutor in the coaching program or have toured professionally with Chamber Music New Zealand.

Gillian Ansell, of the New Zealand String Quartet, said the following of the contest in 2015.

“Just by entering and participating with all your energy and commitment, makes you a kind of winner, so go into it with a very open mind and heart, and be engaged throughout the whole process, regardless of the outcome. And play with joy while you are performing, remembering the fact that you are giving a gift to everyone in the audience as well as the adjudicator, so their spirits can be moved, excited, uplifted by your performance.”

== Awards ==
District round awards
Award	Description
Best group overall	This award is presented to the group adjudicated as the best group overall in each District Round. The winning group is automatically selected to perform at one of the three regional finals. Each member of the group will receive a certificate at a later date acknowledging this achievement.
Highly commended	The adjudicator can name up to four other groups as highly commended in each district round. Each member of the group will receive a certificate at a later date acknowledging this achievement.
NZ music award (in association with SOUNZ and CANZ)	This award is presented in all districts where one or more New Zealand works are performed. Each member of the group will receive a certificate and the winning group will receive a SOUNZ Centre for New Zealand Music cash prize of $100.
Original composition performance award	This award is presented in all districts where one or more Original Composition Senior Section work is performed. Each member of the winning group will receive a certificate and the composer whose work is played will receive a SOUNZ Centre for New Zealand Music voucher to the value of $50.
KBB music award	Groups eligible for this award must contain wind and/or brass and/or percussion instrument(s). Each member of the group will receive a certificate and the group will receive a prize in the form of KBB gift cards, $50 per student.
Adjudicator’s award	Awarded at the adjudicator’s discretion to a group other than the winning one, which is worthy of a special mention. This group will receive certificates at a later date acknowledging this achievement.

Regional round awards
Award	Description
Regional final winner	This is awarded to the group adjudicated the best group overall in each Regional Final. All members of the group must reside in that region to be eligible for this award. Each member of the group will receive a certificate at a later date acknowledging this achievement.
Bronze award	All Regional Finalists receive the Bronze Award. All Bronze Award groups whose repertoire meets the Rules and Conditions will be considered for selection to National Semi-Finals. Each member of the group will receive a certificate at a later date acknowledging this achievement.

National finals and semi-finals
Award	Description	Amount
Platinum award	This award is presented to the overall winning group of the National Final.	$6000
Helen Young diamond award	This award is presented to the inaugural runner-up. Funded by the Deane Endowment Trust.	$2500
Joan Kerr gold award	This award is presented to each of the National Finalist groups.	$800
June Clifford silver award	This award is presented to the six national Semi-Finalist groups who do not progress to the National Final.	$500
National award for the best performance of a New Zealand work	This award is presented to a group playing a New Zealand work as part of the National Final. Funded by SOUNZ.	$500
National KBB music award	The group eligible for this award must contain wind and/or brass and/or percussion instrument(s) and play as part of the National Final. Funded by KBB Music.	KBB Music gift cards.

Composition awards
Award	Description
Overall winner	The national champion will be chosen from these regional winners and will be invited to have their composition performed by professional musicians at the National Finals.
Northern region winner	Includes compositions from Northland, Auckland, Bay of Plenty, Waikato, and East Coast.
Central region winner	Includes compositions from Taranaki, Hawke’s Bay, Whanganui, Manawatū, and Wellington.
Southern region winner	Includes compositions from Nelson/Marlborough, Canterbury, Otago, and Southland.
KBB composition award	Compositions eligible for this award must contain wind and/or brass and/or percussion instrument(s).
Large ensemble award	Awarded to a composition for 5–8 instruments.
Junior award	Awarded to an outstanding composition by a student in year 10 or below.
Newcomer award	Awarded to a first-time entrant of the composition section of the contest.

Historic awards
Award	Years awarded
Poster design	1965–1972
Large ensemble award (7–15 members)	1971–1986
Vocal ensemble award (7–15 members)	1978–1987

== Notable alumni ==
- Michael Houstoun – National Finalist 1969 & 1970.
- Donald Armstrong – Winner of the ‘Original Composition’ section in 1970 with his composition ‘Bits and Pieces’.
- Wilma Smith – Member of The Manukau String Quartet, national finalist in 1972.
- Brigid O'Meeghan – Member of Contempora Trio, overall winner in 1972.
- Jenny Wollerman – Member of Wellington Girls’ College Special Choir, overall vocal winner in 1980.
- Daniel Poynton – Winner of the ‘Elementary Original Composition’ in 1983.
- Justine Cormack – Member of Vienna Trio, overall winner in 1984.
- Sarah Watkins – Member of Vienna Trio, overall winner in 1984.
- Bridget Douglas – Contest participant 1985–1988
- Ashley Brown – Member of the Chalas Trio and Colla Voce, overall winners 1986 and 1988.
- Gretchen Dunsmore – Member of Euphonos, overall winner in 1990.
- Lara Hall – Member of Ivankaia Trio and Aucktet, overall winners in 1995 and 1996.
- Amalia Hall – Member of The Three Slippers and Nacio Para Tocar, overall winners in 2003 and 2004.
- Salina Fisher - Member of Felix Octet, Bedrich Quartet and The Genzmer Trio, overall winners in 2007, 2008 and 2010.
- Matthias Balzat – Member of Sollertinksy Trio, overall winner in 2013.
