= Goodshirt =

New Zealand music band

- Mike, Rodney, Gareth and Murray

Background information
- Origin: Grey Lynn, Auckland, New Zealand
- Genres: Indie rock; alternative rock; pop rock; rock
- Years active: 2000–2005, 2012–present
- Labels: CEMENT Records, Hark Entertainment

Goodshirt are an alternative/pop/rock band from Auckland, New Zealand. The band formed when keyboardist Gareth Thomas left his computer recording setup with the Fisher brothers, Rodney and Murray, for safe keeping.

While still a three piece, the band submitted their song "Green" to a track competition run by radio station 9inety6dot1. Subsequently, station manager Grant Hislop became their manager, and the band was rounded out with drummer Mike Beehre joining the fold.

"Sophie" by keyboard/bassist/vocalist Gareth Thomas was the fourth single from their debut album Good. It was a number one single in New Zealand. Good was released in Canada, Australia, and Japan.

A second album, Fiji Baby, was released in 2004. Like its predecessor, it reached number 5 in the New Zealand charts.

The band went on hiatus in 2005 when Rodney Fisher moved to London to work with Breaks Co-Op, but reunited in 2011, and in early 2012 they began playing again with support gigs for Hall & Oates and Icehouse as part of the A Day on the Green festival. In May 2012 Goodshirt released the new EP Skinny Mirror and including the singles "So Charming" and "Out of Our League".

In 2014, the band released a cover of "Sierra Leone" originally by Coconut Rough. It was made available as a free download through their SoundCloud band page, along with the release of an official music video on YouTube.

== Members ==
- Rodney Fisher – guitar and vocals
- Murray Fisher – guitar
- Gareth Thomas – keyboards/bass and vocals
- Mike Beehre – drums

== Music videos ==
Five videos were directed by Joe Lonie, including some that were shot in a single take. Lonie notes that at the height of their close creative relationship, "they even talked about me being an unofficial fifth member of the band."

Year	Music video	Director	Notes
2000	"Green" (version 1)	Florian Habicht	Set at a beach, the band are buried up to their necks in sand, surrounded by hula-hooping schoolgirls. Filmed in black and white.
2001	"Green" (version 2)	Joe Lonie	Filmed in one continuous take and upside down and sped-up. The band take turns using the sink in a bathroom, with all objects and liquids falling up.
2001	"Blowing Dirt" (version 1)	Joe Lonie	Set at a car wrecker and filmed backwards and in one continuous take, Rodney sings while a Mazda 929 is "un-smashed-up" in the background.
2001	"Blowing Dirt" (version 2)	Joe Lonie	Set at a car wrecker and filmed backwards and in one continuous take, Rodney sings while an Austin 1300 is "un-smashed-up" in the background.
2001	"Place to Be"	Joe Lonie	Shot in a continuous take and slowed down, the camera follows Rodney through an old building as he eats fruit while singing, coming across a series of unusual situations.
2002	"Sophie"	Joe Lonie	Filmed in a continuous take, a young woman listens to music on headphones, unaware that burglars (played by Goodshirt) are behind her, stealing everything in her flat. "Sophie" won Best Music Video at the 2003 New Zealand Music Awards.
2002	"Monotone"	Joe Lonie	Shot in a continuous take, with the camera circling a badminton court. The band are dressed as "Good" and "Evil" teams of badminton-playing beekeepers who seem unable to score a point.
2003	"Buck it Up"	Kezia Barnett	A bullied schoolboy experiences strange visions one day at school. "Buck It Up" won Best Group Video at the 2004 Juice TV Awards.
2004	"Cement"	Kezia Barnett	After pursuing his Rapunzel-like dream woman, Gareth finds himself trapped in a domestic gothic nightmare.
2004	"Fiji Baby"	Wade Shotter	Filmed primarily in a single hotel room set. Rodney checks into a fleabag hotel and messes around for a few hours.
2004	"Lucy"	Wade Shotter	A current affairs show host (played by former 60 Minutes host Amanda Millar) profiles three men who are smitten with Lucy, a famous model.
2011	"So Charming"	Helena Brooks	Dressed in sharp suits, the band members commit a number of anti-social acts and misdemeanours.
2012	"Out of our League"	Rodney Fisher	Rodney plays a man whose two young children build a giant kite around him and fly him in the sky, with Goodshirt playing the "pro kite champions" team.
2014	"Sierra Leone"	Tim Brown	Depicts a man struggling through a nightmarish, psychedelic desert environment. Heavily stylised and a departure from their previous video styles, combining film and animation techniques, with a nod to the original music video by Coconut Rough.

== Discography ==
=== Albums ===
Year	Title	Details	Peak chart positions	Certifications
Year	Title	Details	NZ	Certifications
2001	Good	Released: July 2001; Label: Cement Records, EMI; Catalogue: 5350602	5	NZ: Platinum
2004	Fiji Baby	Released: February 2004; Label: Cement Records, Capitol Records; Catalogue: 5770902	5	NZ: Gold
"—" denotes a recording that did not chart or was not released in that territory.

=== EPs ===
Year	Title	Details	Peak chart positions
Year	Title	Details	NZ
2002	E.G.	Australia release only	—
2012	Skinny Mirror	Released: 30 April 2012; Label: Cement Records, Hark Music; Catalogue: skinny2012	—
"—" denotes a recording that did not chart or was not released in that territory.

=== Singles ===
Year	Single	Peak chart positions	Album
Year	Single	NZ	Album
2000	"Green"	12	Good
2000	"Blowing Dirt"	13	Good
2001	"Place To Be"	50	Good
2001	"Sophie"	1	Good
2003	"Monotone"	31	Good
2004	"Buck It Up"	14	Fiji Baby
2004	"Cement"	—	Fiji Baby
2004	"Fiji Baby"	25	Fiji Baby
2004	"Lucy"	—	Fiji Baby
2012	"So Charming"	—	Skinny Mirror
2012	"Out of Our League"	—	Skinny Mirror
2014	"Sierra Leone" (Cover)	—	—

=== Featured appearances ===
Goodshirt has appeared on many compilations and soundtracks in both New Zealand and Australia.

- 2001 – Starf(Star)Ckers Cyber Garage Music from Planet Aotearoa (Antenna Recordings/EMI) – "Everyday"
- 2001 – Channel Z The Best of Vol. 2 (Warner Music) – "Blowing Dirt"
- 2001 – 100% Kiwi Rock (Warner Music) "Green"
- 2002 – Top of the Pops 2002 Vol. 2 (Universal Music) – "Sophie"
- 2002 – Channel Z: The Best of Vol. 3 (Universal Music) – "Green"
- 2003 – The Strip Soundtrack (Loop Recordings) – "Sophie"
- 2003 – Coleman Sessions Recorded Live at York Street (Warner Music) – "Green"
- 2004 – Hot Wheels: Hot Hits 4 (Shock Records) – "Blowing Dirt"
- 2004 – State of the Nation (EMI) – "Buck It Up"
- 2004 – Big Day Out 04 (Universal Music) – "Sophie"
- 2004 – Now That's What I Call Music 16 (EMI) – "Fiji Baby"
- 2004 – Triumph (Sony Music) – "Sophie"
- 2005 – Top of the Pops 2005 (Universal Music) – "Buck It Up"
- 2005 – Lazy Sunday 5 (EMI) – "My Racing Head"
- 2005 – Triple J – Like a Version: Vol. 1 (ABC Music) – "Gouge Away" (Pixies cover)
- 2006 – More Nature (Sony BMG) – "Sophie"
- 2007 – Outrageous Fortune Westside Rules (WM New Zealand) – "Buck It Up"
