= Tadpole (dinghy) =

Portable boat for sheltered waters

Development
- Name: Tadpole

Hull
- Type: Monohull
- LOA: 6 ft (1.8 m)
- Beam: 3 ft 6 in (1.07 m)

Rig
- Rig type: Gaff rig

Sails
- Total sail area: 30 sq ft (2.8 m^{2})

The Tadpole is a small dinghy with an approximate length of 6 feet (2 m) and an approximate beam of 3 1/2 feet. Its gaff rig has 30 square feet (3 m^{2}) of sail area.
