= Nesian 101 =

Single by Nesian Mystik

from the album Elevator Musiq
- Released: 2008
- Recorded: 2007
- Genre: Hip hop
- Length: 4:43
- Label: Bounce/Universal
- Songwriter(s): Te Awanui Reeder; Feleti Strickson-Pua; Donald McNulty; Junior Rikiau; David Atai; Heath Manukau
- Producer(s): Nesian Mystik

Nesian Mystik singles chronology
"Robbin' Hood Heroes" (2007)	"Nesian 101" (2008)	"Dancefloor" (2008)

"Nesian 101" is the first single released by New Zealand group Nesian Mystik from their album Elevator Musiq. The single was released in 2008, under Bounce/Universal Records.

The song was released as a single in 2008 where it debuted at #36 on the RIANZ New Zealand chart. It later reached #1 on the chart.

The single was certified platinum in New Zealand.

== Track listing ==
1. "Nesian 101" - 4:43
2. "Nesian 101" (video)

== Chart positions ==
Chart (2008)	Peak position
New Zealand RIANZ Singles Chart	1
