= Broken Machine (song) =

Single by Zowie

from the album Love Demolition
- Released: 6 September 2010
- Genre: Synthpop
- Length: 3:28
- Label: Sony
- Songwriter(s): Zowie, J Pilbrow

Zowie singles chronology
"Broken Machine" (2010)	"Bite Back" (2011)

"Broken Machine" is a song written and performed by New Zealand musician Zowie. It was released digitally on 6 September 2010.

== Music video ==
The song received an official music video in 2010; it was directed by Special Problems.

== Chart performance ==
"Broken Machine" debuted on the New Zealand Singles Chart at number 28 on the chart dated 20 September 2010. It reached its peak position of number 9 on the chart dated 18 October 2010, in its fifth week on the chart. The song spent a total of 12 weeks on the top 40.

== Track listing ==
Digital Single

1. "Broken Machine" – 3:28

Digital EP

1. "Broken Machine" (RAC Remix) – 3:32
2. "Broken Machine" (WAWA Remix) – 6:49
3. "Broken Machine" (Computers Want Me Dead Remix) – 4:08
