= Pluto (New Zealand band) =

New Zealand rock band founded in 1994

- Origin: New Zealand
- Genres: Alternative rock
- Years active: 1994–2009, 2015–present
- Label: 5 Moon Entertainment
- Members: Michael Franklin-Browne; Mike Hall; Milan Borich; Tim Arnold; Matthias Jordan

Pluto is a New Zealand rock band from Auckland. Their album Pipeline Under The Ocean, released in 2005 went double platinum on the RIANZ albums chart.

Pluto's nascent trajectory has covered the spectrum of the New Zealand musical stratosphere, bursting brightly onto the scene in 2001, but they broke up in 2009 when they were recording their fourth album.

In 2015, sparked by the discovery of a back-up session of the unfinished album, the group decided to reform. The album was set to be released in September 2019 under their own company, 5 Moon Entertainment. The first single produced by Nick Abbott ‘Oh My Lonely’ was released in July 2019 with their album release ‘IV’ following in September 2019.

== Band members ==
- Milan Borich (lead vocals, guitar)
- Tim Arnold (guitar, vocals)
- Michael Franklin-Browne (drums)
- Mike Hall (bass guitar, vocals)
- Matthias Jordan (keyboards, vocals)

== Band overview ==
Pluto mastered the art of the multi-layered rock sound – sometimes indie, moody and restrained, at other times hook-laden hand-clap pop, often angular, full-energy, anthemic rock. Through the mid-2000s, Pluto was at their zenith, consistently writing rock songs that traversed the musical landscape combining thoughtful, intelligent lyrics with sonic pop melodies to create evocative, memorable and seductive songs.

Pluto has produced three albums. Their first album, Redlight Syndrome, has a range of song types, starting with acoustic folk and ending with heavily distorted metal.

Between that and their next album, the band enjoyed minor highs and a few lows, but they found a collective voice on Pipeline Under The Ocean. The second album was released after much complication from touring and changing record companies. The album's name is derived from the Second World War Pipe-lines Under The Ocean – acronym PLUTO – which supplied fuel to Allied forces after D-Day. The songs are mostly rock and roll. Hits include "Long White Cross", "Dance Stamina" and "Baby Cruel". The album went double platinum and Pluto enjoyed successes at the 2006 New Zealand Music Awards, winning Single of the Year with "Long White Cross", as well as reaching the finals for the People's Choice Award, losing out to Fat Freddy's Drop.

In 2007, the band's lead singer, Milan Borich's version of the Alphaville song "Forever Young" was used in the Gregor Nicholas-directed TV commercials, part of Tourism New Zealand's "100% Pure New Zealand" campaign, which market New Zealand as "the youngest country on earth".

The band was looking at releasing another album in 2019 but this did not eventuate, although in July 2019, the single 'Oh My Lonely' was released as an EP, with a music video directed by Milan Borich and edited by Nick Abbott (who also produced the song). Milan also produced and directed their 'Hey Little' (2001) and 'Snake Charmer' (2010) videos.

== Discography ==
=== Albums ===
Year	Title	Peak chart position	Certification
Year	Title	NZ	Certification
Albums
2001	Redlight Syndrome: Label: Antenna Recordings	25	–
2005	Pipeline Under The Ocean: Release date: 7 February 2005; Label: EMI	13	NZ: 2× Platinum
2007	Sunken Water: Release date: 22 October 2007; Label: EMI; Catalogue no: 5057742	38	–
EPs
2019	Oh My Lonely: Single Release date: 6 July 2019; Label: 5 Moon Entertainment	–	–
EPs
2000	A1 A2: Label: Antenna Recordings	–	–

=== Featured appearances ===
The group's songs have appeared on the following compilations:

- (2000) – If Licks Could Kill (Antenna Music) – "Moscow Snow'" and "Field 11 Cows"
- (2001) – Live at Helen's (Festival Mushroom Records) – "Hey Little"
- (2004) – State of the Nation (EMI) – "Perfectly Evil"
- (2006) – Broken Dreams II (Warner Music) – "Long White Cross"
- (2006) – Rippon 06 (Loop Recordings) – "Dance Stamina"

"Long White Cross" from Pipeline Under the Ocean was used in the EA Sports computer game, Cricket 07.

=== Singles ===
Year	Title	Peak chart positions	Album
Year	Title	NZ	Album
2000	"Hey Little"	—	Redlight Syndrome
2000	"Moscow Snow"	—	Redlight Syndrome
2001	"She's Jive"	—	Redlight Syndrome
2001	"Stick With It"	—	Redlight Syndrome
2001	"Bananas in the Mist"	—	Redlight Syndrome
2005	"Long White Cross"	30	Pipeline Under The Ocean
2006	"Dance Stamina"	32	Pipeline Under The Ocean
2006	"Broken Hearted"	—	Pipeline Under The Ocean
2006	"Baby Cruel"	—	Pipeline Under The Ocean
2007	"French Grave"	—	Sunken Water
2009	"Snake Charmer"	—	
2019	"Oh My Lonely"	—	
"—" denotes a recording that did not chart or was not released in that territory.
