= Sophie (song) =

2002 single by Goodshirt

Single by Goodshirt

from the album Good
- Released: 2001
- Length: 3:44
- Label: Cement
- Songwriter: Gareth Thomas
- Producer: Goodshirt

Goodshirt singles chronology
"Place to Be" (2001)	"Sophie" (2001)	"Monotone" (2002)

Music video
- "Sophie" on YouTube

"Sophie" is a song by New Zealand band Goodshirt written, sung and produced by Gareth Thomas. Released as the fourth single from the band's debut studio album Good, the track became the band's only New Zealand number-one single in May 2002 and was the country's 18th-highest-selling single of the year.

== Music video ==
Filmed in a continuous take, the music video shows a young woman listening to music on headphones, unaware that burglars (played by Goodshirt) are behind her, stealing everything in her flat. The video won Best Music Video at the 2003 New Zealand Music Awards.

== Track listing ==
New Zealand CD single

1. "Sophie" (album version)
2. "Green" (demo)
3. "Melobeeda" (full length version)

== Charts ==
=== Weekly charts ===
Chart (2002)	Peak position
New Zealand (Recorded Music NZ)	1

=== Year-end charts ===
Chart (2002)	Position
New Zealand (RIANZ)	18
