= 48May =

New Zealand band

- Origin: Hamilton, New Zealand
- Genres: Pop rock; pop-punk
- Years active: 2004–2008
- Past members: Blackbeard; CaptainHook; Shannon Brown; Stan Bicknell; Jarod Brown

48May was a New Zealand pop rock group. The band consisted of Jon Austin, who went by the nickname 'Blackbeard' (vocals, guitar), Hook Stowers, who went by the nickname 'CaptainHook' (guitar, vocals), Stan Bicknell (drums, vocals) and Shannon Brown (bass, vocals). Hook and Jon went to Hamilton Boys' High School together, while Stowers in the year above, was the lead singer in the band The Grinners (previously called Lyon), while Shannon Brown is well known on the New Zealand music circuit for his roles in bands such as Tadpole.

The name "48May" came from their residence during university; at 48 May Street, in Hamilton. They achieved success within New Zealand including a place on the New Zealand leg of the 2005 Big Day Out and Edgefest05 tour, their first record (The Mad Love) going Gold in NZ, and their second record (Streetlights and Shadows) being released in Japan by Triple Vision followed by 48May touring through Japan with Four Year Strong and Every Avenue in support of the release. They also performed as support act for Alien Ant Farm, Simple Plan, Panic! at the Disco, and Steriogram, among others. They were also huge fans of famous pirates such as Blackbeard and Captain Hook.

48May split due to all members going their separate ways. Jon is now working in advertising in Sydney, married with a son; CaptainHook was Head Engineer at York Street Studio in Auckland, before moving to Melbourne to be Product Manager of Imaging Technology at Blackmagic Design; Stan is living in Tauranga; and, in 2010, Shannon studied at the University of Waikato, majoring in English and Theatre Studies. Shannon began a teaching career at Hamilton Boys' High School as head of drama in 2013. He is now the senior curriculum leader of drama at Rototuna High School.

== Band members ==
- Blackbeard a.k.a. Jonathan Austin Ho (vocals, guitar) (2004–2008)
- CaptainHook a.k.a. Hook Stowers (guitar, vocals) (2004–2008)
- Shannon Brown a.k.a. Adam Shannon Brown (bass, vocals) (2004–2008)
- Stan Bicknell a.k.a. Daniel Bicknell (drums, vocals) (2007–2008)
- Jarod Brown a.k.a. Daniel Jarod Brown (vocals, drums) (2004–2007)

== Discography ==
=== Albums ===
Year	Title	Details	Peak chart positions	Certifications
Year	Title	Details	NZ	Certifications
2004	The Mad Love	Released: 13 October 2004; Tour edition released: 2005; Label: FMR; Catalogue: 338332	19	NZ: Gold
2007	Streetlights and Shadows	Released: 30 April 2007; Label: Warner Music NZ; Catalogue: 5101170332	39	
"—" denotes a recording that did not chart or was not released in that territory.

=== Singles ===
Year	Title	Peak chart positions	Album
Year	Title	NZ	Album
2005	"Fightback"	—	The Mad Love
2005	"Come Back Down"	—	The Mad Love
2005	"Leather and Tattoos"	14	The Mad Love
2005	"Home By 2"	11	The Mad Love
2006	"Into the Sun"	—	The Mad Love
2006	"Things That Fall Apart" feat. Kid Deft from Fast Crew	—	The Mad Love
2006	"Nervous Wreck"	21	Streetlights and Shadows
2007	"Big Shock"	14	Streetlights and Shadows
2007	"The End"	—	Streetlights and Shadows
2007	"Car Crash Weather"	—	Streetlights and Shadows
"—" denotes a recording that did not chart or was not released in that territory.

== Awards ==
=== Juice TV Music Awards ===
- Best Indie Video ("Fightback") 2003
- Song of the Year ("Home by 2"): 2005
- ZM People's Choice Video ("Come Back Down") 2004
- Telecom Top Video ("Car Crash Weather") 2008
