= Polliwog (disambiguation) =

A polliwog is a tadpole, the offspring of an amphibian.

Polliwog or pollywog may also refer to:

- Binyah Binyah Polliwog, a character on the children's television series Gullah Gullah Island
- Pollywog, a sailor who has not crossed the Equator, in the Line-crossing ceremony initiation rite
- "The Pollywog", a song by Captain Bogg and Salty from Bedtime Stories For Pirates
- Polliwog Park, in Manhattan Beach, California
