= Tadpole (band) =

New Zealand band

- Origin: Auckland, New Zealand
- Genres: Alternative rock, nu metal, pop rock
- Years active: 1994 – 2006; 2024 – present
- Label: Precise Digital
- Members: Lauren Marshall; Dean Lawton; DJ Kritikl; Chris Yong
- Past members: Renée Brennan; Henry Penny; Paul Matthews; Andre Lynam-Smith; Greg W Baker

Tadpole is a New Zealand rock band from Auckland. The band formed in June 1994 by guitarist Taisia Huckle and drummer Mareea Paterson. The band broke apart in late 2006 after numerous changes to the line-up. Tadpole reformed with past members Chris Yong, Dean Lawton, Shannon Brown, and DJ Kritikl in March 2024.

== Career ==
=== Before 2000 ===
Before the band's formation and 1999, Tadpole went through many line-up changes. At one point, the members were all female except one. Vocalist Renée Brennan and drummer/manager Dean Lawton were stable members of the band since the late 1990s.

During that time, the singles "Blind" (radio release only, 1998), "For Me" (single release, 1999), and "Backdoor" (also a single release, 1999), were released.

In regards to the song "Backdoor", the band stated "[it] was about our struggle thus far to make it in the New Zealand music industry and the initial frustration of trying to get our music played on radio, TV, or anywhere really. The 'backdoor' part came about because we felt we were never going to be accepted by the student radio stations, we'd just have to come in through the back door somehow. And yes, for those who want to know, the metaphor of anal sex is intended. I liken our struggle to getting buggered over, and over, and over again. In a very loving and tongue-in-cheek way."

=== 2000–2002 ===
Their debut album The Buddhafinger, was released in New Zealand in 2000 and proved to be a hit, debuting at #2 on the Official New Zealand Top 40 Albums Chart. The 2000 line-up officially consisted of Renée Brennan (vocals), Dean Lawton (drums), Chris Yong (guitar), Paul Matthews (bass), and Kevin May AKA DJ Kritikl (turntablism). The latter would leave the lineup late in 2000, and the band reverted to a four-piece.

In January 2002, Paul Matthews left to concentrate on work with another New Zealand band, Stylus. After a few months of speculation, his place was taken by Hamilton bass player Shannon Brown, previously from the band Mama Said.

August 2002 came the follow-up album, The Medusa which was also a top 10 hit. In contrast with The Buddhafinger, The Medusa had "a much darker, at times menacing sound".

=== 2003–2006 ===
February 2003 brought significant upheaval to the band. Citing musical differences, both guitarist Chris Yong and bassist Shannon Brown left. They would join other bands, Redline and 48May respectively.

For months after Tadpole played sporadically with temporary guitar/bass parts, before settling on two new members, Henry Penny, and Ollie Gordon. This line-up had a lower level of activity during 2004–2005, playing four to five gigs at a time, rather than whole tours.

Tadpole toured several times in New Zealand and played gigs all around the world. In February 2005, their third album Tadpole was recorded; however, it took a year and a half for its release. During that time, the singles "Too Hard" and "Yesterday" were released to New Zealand radio and video stations.

=== Split ===
In June 2006, the band announced it was breaking up after a final Auckland concert and the release of their self-titled album Tadpole.

In November 2022 The Tadpole Collection (1994-2006) was released. This was a four-disc set collating their three released albums as well as a new album called Remains Of The Day (Rarities and Antiquities) which contained B-sides and other unreleased tracks.

=== 2024 Reformation ===
On 21 March 2024 it was announced that Tadpole had reformed and would tour with Devilskin on their 10th anniversary tour. Original singer, Renée Brennan, was not interested in reforming for the tour so guest vocalist, Emma Dilemma, filled in. Joining Dilemma and Chris Yong was Dean Lawton on drums, Shannon Brown on bass, and DJ Kritikl on the turntables. Later that year it would be announced they will be playing two shows in November and a surprise show beforehand in Auckland with new singer, Lauren Marshall.

=== 2025–Current ===
In August 2025, Tadpole released the single "George", an uptempo reworking of the classic 1994 Headless Chickens track, and the band's first new release in 19 years. The tracked was mastered by the Grammy Award winning Ted Jensen, and reached #12 on the Official Aotearoa Music Charts. That month the band also appeared at the Go Live Festival on 23 August 2025.

To mark the 25th anniversary of The Buddhafinger, the band toured New Zealand in late 2025, with dates including Spark Arena in Auckland, Whangārei, Christchurch, Mount Maunganui and New Plymouth. The anniversary was accompanied by a limited-edition double vinyl pressing comprising The Buddhafinger (Re-Ordered), a resequencing of the original album by DJ Kritikl, and The Buddhafinger Bootleg, a live recording taken from the album's 2000 release tour.

In February 2026 the band performed at Auckland Domain on a bill with Good Charlotte, Highly Suspect and Yellowcard, and were the subject of a Rolling Stone Australia/NZ feature ahead of the show. On 14 March 2026 they appeared at the Hokitika Wildfoods Festival on the West Coast.

On 15 May 2026, Tadpole released "Falling Into You", the band's first original composition since their 2006 self-titled album. The single was recorded largely at Old North Studios in Kumeu, with additional bass recorded in Greymouth while the band were touring the West Coast. It was mixed by Tiki Taane, with vocal production by Boh Runga, and mastering by Chris Chetland at Kog Studio. "Falling Into You" reached #3 on the New Zealand Rock Airplay chart, #4 on the Official Aotearoa Music Charts and #17 on the NZ Airplay chart, and received airplay on The Rock, Radio Hauraki and Bayrock FM.

Tadpole are scheduled to perform at the Brewtown Amped Up Festival in Upper Hutt on 24 October 2026, alongside Devilskin, Villainy, Head Like a Hole, Written by Wolves and The Boondocks. The band have stated that further singles and a new album are in progress.

== Discography ==
=== Albums ===
Year	Title	Peak Chart Positions	Certification
Year	Title	NZ	Certification
2000	The Buddhafinger: Antenna Records	2	RMNZ: 3× Platinum
2002	The Medusa: Antenna Records	10	RMNZ: Platinum
2006	Tadpole: Benthouse Records	-	

=== Compilations ===
Year	Title	Peak Chart Positions	Certification
Year	Title	NZ	Certification
2022	The Tadpole Collection (1994-2006): Tadpole Music NZ	4	-

=== Other ===
Year	Title	Peak Chart Positions	Certification
Year	Title	NZ	Certification
2022	Remains Of The Day (Rarities and Antiquities): Tadpole Music NZ	-	-

=== EPs ===
Year	Title	Peak Chart Positions	Certification
Year	Title	NZ	Certification
EPs
2001	Nothing New	-	-

=== Singles ===
Year	Title	Peak Chart Positions	Album
Year	Title	NZ	Album
1998	"Blind"	—	The Buddhafinger
1999	"For Me"	12	The Buddhafinger
1999	"Backdoor"	12	The Buddhafinger
1999	"Alright"	21	The Buddhafinger
2000	"No Man"	—	The Buddhafinger
2001	"Number One"	—	The Buddhafinger
2001	"Better Days"	—	The Buddhafinger
2001	"Nothing New"	23	The Medusa
2002	"Now Today Forever"	—	The Medusa
2002	"Condition Chronic"	—	The Medusa
2003	"Just Not Rock And Roll"	—	The Medusa
2003	"Always Be Mine"	—	The Medusa
2003	"Frequency"	—	The Medusa
2005	"Too Hard"	—	Tadpole
2005	"Yesterday"	—	Tadpole
2005	"Offering"	—	Tadpole
2023	"Set To Fade"	—	The Buddhafinger
2025	"George"	12	
2026	"Falling into you"	4	
