= Villainy (band) =

New Zealand alternative rock band

- Origin: Auckland, New Zealand
- Genre: Rock
- Years active: 2010–present
- Members: James Dylan; Neill Fraser; Dave Johnston; Thom Watts
- Website: http://www.villainymusic.com

Villainy is a rock band from Auckland, New Zealand. Formed in 2010 the band consists of James Dylan (bass guitar), Neill Fraser (vocals and guitar), Dave Johnston (drums and backing vocals) and Thom Watts (lead guitar).

Villainy are three-time winners of the NZ Music Award for Best Rock Album/Artist and have shared the stage with numerous local and international acts including AC/DC, Incubus, The Offspring, The Used, Papa Roach, Halestorm, Billy Talent and Seether.

== Band history ==
=== Beginnings ===
Villainy grew from the band Inverse Order from New Windsor, Auckland, an alt-rock group featuring Villainy members Thom Watts, Neill Fraser, and James Dylan. After recruiting drummer Dave Johnston, the band took the name Villainy during recording of their debut album with producer Tom Larkin. The band released their debut single "Alligator Skin" online in May 2011. It was playlisted on radio station The Rock and reached number one in the Radioscope New Zealand Rock Charts.

The band's second single "The Answer" was released in February, with the video following in May. In February the band was the sole support for Incubus at their two New Zealand arena shows. This was followed by a major centres tour in July 2012 with Luger Boa and Clap Clap Riot.

Their third single, "Gather Yourselves", was released in August 2012 and reached number one on the Radioscope New Zealand Rock Charts, matching the success of their debut.

=== Mode. Set. Clear. ===
Villainy's debut album Mode. Set. Clear. was recorded with producer Tom Larkin, primarily in the Melbourne suburb of Brunswick and also at Auckland's Roundhead Studios. It was released in New Zealand on 19 October 2012 with cover art by Storm Thorgerson. The album debuted at #8 on the RIANZ Album Charts and was the #1 New Zealand album.

In February 2012 Villainy supported Incubus at Vector Arena in Auckland. In February 2013 Villainy supported The Offspring and Billy Talent at Vector Arena. March 2013 saw them performing a late afternoon slot at Homegrown Music Festival in Wellington. The band then embarked on an eight-date New Zealand tour throughout the rest of that month and into April with New Plymouth band Rival State.

The third single off Mode. Set. Clear., "Another Time", was released late 2013 and continued Villainy's chart topping trend, also reaching #1 on the New Zealand Radioscope New Zealand Rock Charts. The album's final single "Ammunition" reached at least the #4 spot on the chart.

Villainy traveled to Australia in September 2013 for their first international shows performing showcases in Brisbane, Sydney and Melbourne including two performances at the annual Big Sound conference held in Brisbane's Fortitude Valley. Returning home Villainy toured New Zealand for second time in October performing 12 shows with Blacklistt followed by a win at the New Zealand Music Awards for Best Rock Album.

In the summer of 2014 Villainy appeared at the New Zealand leg of the annual Big Day Out festival and again at the Homegrown Music Festival.

=== Dead Sight ===
In June 2015 Villainy released "Syria". This was closely followed by "Safe Passage", the first official single from the new album, Dead Sight, which was released 18 September through Warner Music NZ. The album debuted at #4 on the New Zealand album charts, and "Safe Passage" reached #1 on the Radioscope New Zealand Rock Charts.

The band embarked on an Australian tour in November, and in December opened for AC/DC on the New Zealand leg of their tour performing to crowds of 60,000 at two stadium shows in Auckland and Wellington. In January Villainy performed to an estimated 10,000 people in Auckland's Grey Lynn Park and also again appeared at the Homegrown Festival in February.

In 2016, the Rock FM radio station's listener voted countdown, The Rock 1000+500, saw Villainy earn 10 tracks in the countdown, with the best being "Safe Passage", at 58. In November that year, Villainy won their second consecutive award for Best Rock Album at the 2016 New Zealand Music Awards with Dead Sight.

=== Raised in the Dark ===
In March 2018 Villainy released Tiny Little Island, this was followed by their second NZ stint with Incubus supporting them in Auckland and Christchurch. Villainy spent the rest of the year completing their upcoming record before touring NZ across spring with Shihad and releasing the second song from the upcoming album, IFXS. In March the band returned to the stage performing to a capacity crowd at Homegrown Festival. This also heralded the release of the single DREAMS and its music video, an homage to Wham!'s iconic Club Tropicana.

Raised in the Dark debuted at #2 on release in the NZ Top 40, beaten only by Ed Sheeran whose latest album was released in the same week. This was accompanied by a seven date sold out nationwide tour which included Villainy's first headline performance at Auckland's Powerstation. In The Rock radio stations annual Rock 1500 listener voted countdown Villainy came in at #9 with DREAMS. For the 2019 NZ Music Awards Villainy received nominations for Best Artwork and Best Rock Artist taking home Best Rock Artist, making this a hat-trick for the band. Villainy also performed their single DREAMS live at the awards.

== Discography ==
=== Studio albums ===
- Mode. Set. Clear. (2012)
- Dead Sight (2015)
- Raised in the Dark (2019)

=== EPs ===
- Beggar (2020)
- Dead Sides (2021)

=== Singles ===
List of singles, with selected chart positions
Title	Year	Peak chart positions		Album
Title	Year	NZ Rock Airplay	Radioscope Top 100	Album
"Alligator Skin"	2011	1	53	Mode. Set. Clear.
"The Answer"	2012	7	-	Mode. Set. Clear.
"Gather Yourselves"	2012	1	68	Mode. Set. Clear.
"Another Time"	2013	1	62	Mode. Set. Clear.
"Ammunition"	2014	4	84	Mode. Set. Clear.
"Safe Passage"	2015	1	72	Dead Sight
"Give Up The Ghost"	2015	3	86	Dead Sight
"Tiny Little Island"	2018	3	82	Raised in the Dark
"Raised in the Dark"	2019	2	-	Raised in the Dark
"DREAMS"	2019	1	92	Raised in the Dark
"-CUT-"	2019	1	78	Raised in the Dark
"Beggar"	2020	2	-	Raised in the Dark
"The Launch"	2022	1	64	Single
"Miles Away"	2024	1	61	Single
"Happy Waste"	2026	1	42	Single

== Awards ==
Year	Nominee / work	Award	Result
2013	Mode. Set. Clear.	NZ Music Awards - Best Rock Album	Won
2016	Dead Sight	NZ Music Awards - Best Rock Album	Won
2019	Raised in the Dark	NZ Music Awards - Best Rock Artist	Won
