= Homegrown Music Festival (New Zealand) =

Coordinates: 41.287256°S 174.779005°E

- Genre: Rock, indie, electronic, dub & roots
- Dates: April/March
- Locations: Wellington, New Zealand
- Years active: 2008 - present
- Website: homegrown.net.nz

Homegrown Music Festival has been held annually in New Zealand, since 2008. In 2026 the host city changed from Wellington to Hamilton. It showcases artists from New Zealand.

== 2008 ==
Saturday 26 April 2008

Line-up

Rock stage	Indie stage	Electronic stage	Dub & roots state
Shihad; Kora; Pluto; The Feelers; Opshop; Elemeno P; Goodnight Nurse; Autozamm; The Valves	The Mint Chicks; The Phoenix Foundation; The Checks; Motocade; So So Modern; The Rabble; The Coshercot Honeys	Concord Dawn; Minuit; Sunshine Soundsystem; Recloose and Tyna; Dick Johnson; Takas; Tim Phin	Salmonella Dub; The Black Seeds; Tiki; Cornerstone Roots; Ladi6; Little Bushman; Mike Fabulous

== 2009 ==
The 2009 festival was held on 14 March 2009. It was set across 5 stages along the waterfront and included 35 of New Zealand's premier bands and DJs.

Line-up

Rock stage	Indie stage	Electronic stage	Dub & roots state	Amphitheatre stage
Supergroove; Blindspott; Opshop; Evermore; Elemeno P; Goodnight Nurse; Streetwise Scarlett; Luger Boa	Head Like A Hole; Weta; Dimmer; The Checks; Fur Patrol; Bang! Bang! Eche!; Tiger Tones; Brain Slaves; Knave Knixx	Shapeshifter; State of Mind; Aural Trash; Tim Phin; Dick Johnson; Clarke Gayford; DJ Spragga (Sola Rosa)	Concord Dawn; Kora; The Black Seeds; Tiki; Tahuna Breaks; Katchafire	Dick Johnson vs Cool Kids Club; Nick D; DJ Reno; Sunshine Sound System; Manuel Bundy

== 2010 ==
The 2010 edition was called Vodafone Homegrown after the sponsors, Vodafone. It was held on 20 February, with the line-up announced on 14 September 2009.

Line-up

Rock stage	Indie stage	Electronic stage	Dub & roots state
Shihad; The Feelers; The Datsuns; Midnight Youth; Goodnight Nurse; Dane Rumble	The Mint Chicks; Liam Finn; Cut Off Your Hands; Pluto; The Checks; Bang Bang Eche; Motocade; Knives At Noon	Minuit; Antiform; Aural Trash; Tim Phin; Dick "Majik" Johnson; Nick D	The Black Seeds; Salmonella Dub; Ladi6; Katchafire; Opensouls; Sunshine Sound System; Manuel Bundy; Kora

== 2011 ==
The 2011 edition was named Jim Beam Homegrown after the sponsors, Jim Beam, and was held on 5 March 2011. It had a pop and RnB stage for the first time and had more acts than previous years.

Line-up

Jim Beam rock stage	Vodafone dub & roots stage	Vodafone pop & RnB stage	Nokia electronic stage	Redbull Studio live stage	Redbull amphitheatre stage
Blindspott; I Am Giant; Black River Drive; Midnight Youth; The Checks; The Feelers; Elemeno P	Shapeshifter; TrinityRoots; Tiki & the Dub Soldiers; Katchafire; Six60; Salmonella Dub; Sunshine Soundsystem; Jayson Norris	Nesian Mystik; Dane Rumble; J. Williams; Scribe vs. Savage; PNC; Kidz in Space; Ivy Lies; Motocade; Supermodel; DJ Logikal	State of Mind Live; The Upbeats; Optimus Gryme; Dick Johnson; Tim Phin; Clarke Gayford; Maya and Vanya	The Clean; Die! Die! Die!; The Phoenix Foundation; Cairo Knife Fight; Kids of 88; Coco Solid; Tommy Ill; The Ruby Suns; Artisan Guns; Family Cactus; DJ Lotion	3 on 3 Breaking; Downtown Brown; Jayson Norris; Brazilbeat Soundsystem

This was Blindspott's first gig since reforming.

This was one of Nesian Mystik's last ever gigs.

== 2012 ==
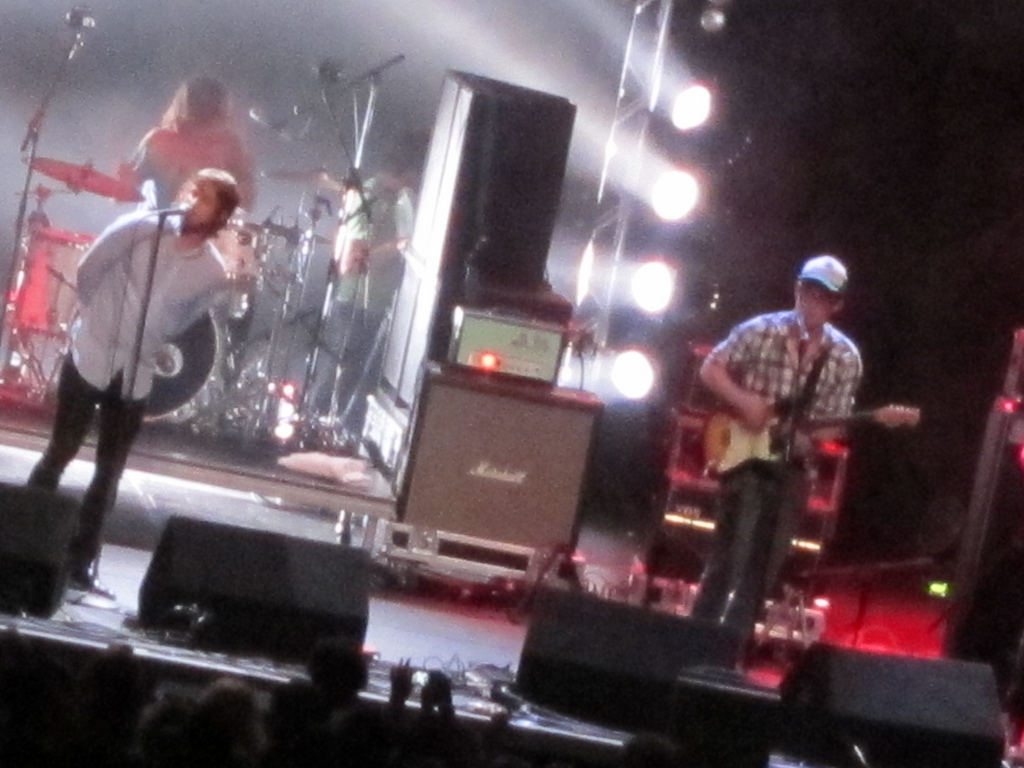
The Checks

The 2012 edition was on 18 February 2012. For the fifth consecutive year the festival was a sell out (17,000 tickets).

Line-up

Jim Beam rock stage	Vodafone dub & roots stage	Vodafone pop & RnB stage	Jim Beam electronic stage	Redbull lab	Redbull amphitheatre stage
Shihad; Blacklistt; The Feelers; Opshop; The Checks; The Thomas Oliver Band; Shotgun Alley; Black River Drive	Kora; Sunshine Soundsystem; Fat Freddy's Drop; The Black Seeds; DJ Sir-Vere; Six60; Sola Rosa; 1814	Kids of 88; Zowie; David Dallas; Smashproof; P-Money; K.One; Kidz In Space; Marek; Home Brew; Computers Want Me Dead	State of Mind Live; Optimus Gryme ft. Tiki; Bulletproof; Dick Johnson; Mayavanya; Kids of 88; Karn Hall	King Kapisi / Che Fu / Manuel Bundy; Minuit ft. Gamelan; The Adults; Ahoribuzz & Guests; Tiki acoustic set; Redbird Jnr; Concord Dawn vs. P-Money; Nick D & Yewala Sound System	Breakdancing; Juse1; Downtown Brown; Manuel Bundy

== 2013 ==
The 2013 edition was held on 2 March 2013. For the sixth consecutive year the festival was a sell out (17,000 tickets).

Line-up

Jim Beam Rock	Vodafone Pop/RnB	Red Bull Sound Lab	Vodafone Dub & Roots	Lipton Ice Tea Electronic	Red Bull Amphitheatre
Shihad; I Am Giant; King Cannons; Elemeno P; Villainy; Clap Clap Riot; Midnight Youth; Luger Boa	P-Money Showcase; Kids of 88; Zowie; Ruby Frost; David Dallas; Home Brew; Savage; Pieter T; PNC	Weird Together; DJ Sir Vere featuring Che Fu, PNC, K.One; Illegal Sound Clash; Cairo Knife Fight; All My Brothers; P Digsss & the Peacekeepers; The Babysitters Circus	Shapeshifter; Kora; The Black Seeds; Ladi6; Ahoribuzz; Katchafire; Thane Kirby vs Felix 5	Concord Dawn; The Upbeats featuring MC Tali; Minuit; Opiuo; Dick Johnson; North Shore Pony Club	Breakdancing contest; Juse1; Downtown Brown; DJ Spell

== 2014 ==
The 2014 edition was held on 15 February 2014. The festival included over 60 acts and organisers claimed it was "the most Kiwi music ever assembled in one place at one time".

Line-up

Dub & Roots	Rock	Red Bull Sound Lab	Lipton Ice Tea Electronic	Pop and RnB	Locally Sourced	Urban
Six60; Fat Freddys Drop; The Black Seeds; Katchafire; Ladi6; Sons of Zion; Sunshine Soundsystem; DJ Sir-Vere	Blacklistt; Gin Wigmore; The Feelers; Opshop; Head Like a Hole; Devilskin; Villainy; Fire at Will	The Adults; Cairo Knife Fight; Beastwars; Tiki Taane & Jayson Norris; Flash Harry All-star Jam; Thomas Oliver & Louis Baker; Deceptikonz; DJ Spell; DJ Redbird Jnr	State of Mind ft. MC Woody; Optimus Gryme ft. MC Tiki; Misfits of Zion; The Upbeats; P-Money vs. Dick Johnson; Weird Together; PleasePlease; Aroha	Nesian Mystik; Savage; P-Money; Smashproof; @Peace; Swiss, Donnell and Brownhill; Awa, PNC & Pieter T; Dane Rumble; Jupiter Project; Marek	Benny Tipene; The Digg; Totems; Paddy Fred; Vanessa Stacey; Eb and Sparrow; Phoebe Hurst; Jesse Sheehan	3 on 3 breaking; Triple S Graffiti Crew; DJ Battles; Juse1; DJ Stretchmark; Downtown Brown; DJ Spell

The lineup also included busking acts: Shay Horay, Mullet Man, Sport Suzie, Mr Fungus, Fraser Hooper, Wellington Batucada.

== 2015 ==
The 2015 edition was held on 7 March 2014. Tickets sold out and around 17,000 people attended the festival.

Line-up

Rock	Dub & Roots	Pop and RnB	Locally Sourced	Lipton Ice Tea Electronic	Sound Lab
Shihad; Blacklistt; Devilskin; I Am Giant; Villainy; Black River Drive; Silence the City; Ekko Park	Shapeshifter; Six60; Kora; Katchafire; Tomorrow People; Tahuna Breaks; Sunshine Soundsystem; DJ Sir-Vere	David Dallas; Deceptikonz; Sid Diamond; P Money; Sammy J; Ginny Blackmore; Jamie McDell; Benny Tipene; Jetski Safari ft. Helen Corry; Marek	Estere; Black City Lights; Drax Project; The Bone$; Pea Stew; Nomad; Ash Graham; A Girl Named Mo	Opiuo; Concord Dawn; The Upbeats; Dan Aux ft. Randa; The Peacekeepers ft. Tiki &PNC; Clarke & Aroha; Beat Mob	@Peace ft. Team Dynamite; Bongmaster; L.A.B. (Laughton & Brad Kora); Rhombus in Dub (DJ Set); Brockaflower; Raiza Biza, Young Tapz and Mzwetwo; Diaz Grimm ft. PNC, Spycc and INF; Downtown Brown; Donell Lewis and Brownhill

Homegrown 2015 introduced the Promenade stage, located on the Wellington waterfront with free access to the general public. Acts who performed on this stage were: Randa, Midnight Gallery, K+Lab, Tiki Taane (acoustic), J Brown & the Mic Smith, Third3ye, and Kid'n'Rei.
