= I Went to This Party and There Were 88 Guards with Guns =

Compilation album by Minuit
- Released: 2008
- Genre: Electronic
- Label: Dollhouse Records
- Producer: Minuit

Minuit chronology
The Guards Themselves (2006)	I Went to This Party and There Were 88 Guards with Guns (2008)	Find Me Before I Die a Lonely Death.com (2009)

I Went to This Party and There Were 88 Guards with Guns alternatively known as 88 Guards with Guns is a compilation album by New Zealand band, Minuit, that was released in 2008 to expand their fan base in Europe the United Kingdom.

The album's title is a play on the band's previous releases; The 88, The Guns EP and The Guards Themselves.

The songs excluded from this compilation were released on The 88 EP and The Guards Themselves EP.

== Track listing ==
1. "The Boy with the Aubergine Hair"
2. "Claire"
3. "Bury You in Brazil"
4. "Except You"
5. "Fuji"
6. "Lock the Doors, Block the Roads"
7. "Do Me In"
8. "Djordj"
9. "Suave as Sin"
10. "Am Em"
11. "Body-Shaped Box"
12. "Nymphs"
13. "A Room Full of Cute"
14. "Fake!"
15. "The Sum of Us"
16. "Menace [Snarler Mix]"
