= Dance Music Will Tear Us Apart =

EP by Minuit
- Released: November 2010
- Recorded: 2010
- Genre: Electronic
- Length: 24 mins
- Label: Tardus Music

Minuit chronology
Find Me Before I Die a Lonely Death.com (2009)	Dance Music Will Tear Us Apart (2010)	Dance Music Will Tear Us Apart, Again (2011)

Dance Music Will Tear Us Apart is an EP from New Zealand band Minuit released in 2010.

The EP was produced by 'Funknslocuts' (Ryan Beehre) and 'Gimme A C!' (Paul Dodge), in collaboration with lead singer Ruth Carr. The EP features remixes of previous Minuit releases, as well as unreleased tracks; "Stop Dancing" and "Suicide Bridge". It also includes the track "Of Regrets", a remix of "We're All Scared Professor" from the album The Guards Themselves (2006).

== Track listing ==
1. "Stop Dancing" Gimme A C!
2. "Out of Luck" Funknslocuts
3. "Suicide Bridge" Funknslocuts
4. "Queen of the Flies" Gimme A C!
5. "Of Regrets" Funknslocuts
6. "Aries" Gimme A C!
