= Red (Devilskin album) =

2020 album by Devilskin

Studio album by Devilskin
- Released: 3 April 2020
- Length: 58:11
- Label: Devilskin/Rhythm/DRM

Devilskin chronology
Be Like the River (2016)	Red (2020)

Singles from Red
- 1. "Endo" Released: 7 September 2018; 2. "All Fall Down" Released: 5 April 2019; 3. "Corrode" Released: 17 January 2020; 4. "Everybody's High But Me" Released: 20 March 2020; 5. "Sweet Release" Released: 28 August 2020

Red is the third studio album released by New Zealand alternative metal band Devilskin.

== Production ==
The album was primarily recorded at Roundhead Studios in Auckland in mid-2019, starting from a collection of 30 demo tracks. "Endo" was released as a single in 2018, and describes lead vocalist Jennie Skulander's experiences having an 11 centimetre endometrioma removed from her ovary. The song "Sweet Release" was inspired by the death of Nicky Autumn Stevens, and released as a single in 2020 in collaboration with Lifeline Aotearoa, to raise awareness about suicide prevention.

== Release and promotion ==
The album was announced on 17 January 2020, coinciding with the band's single "Corrode". The album was released on streaming and digital download internationally on 3 April 2020, with a physical CD and LP release following on 1 May 2020. After needing to cancel their international tour due to the effects of the COVID-19 pandemic, Devilskin held the Paint NZ Red tour in New Zealand in August and September 2020.

== Critical reception ==
Doug Peters of Ambient Light Blog praised the album, calling it "Devilskin's finest album to date". He felt that the album had a "bigger sound than their past releases", and that band members outside of Jennie Skulander were showcased moreso on Red then their previous albums. Peters also felt that there were some issues with Skulander's vocals on "Same Life", and that "Bright Lights" had sections which were not cohesive.

== Commercial reception ==
The album debuted at 8 on the New Zealand albums charts, reaching a peak of number two in May. Red spent a total of seven weeks in the top 40 albums chart. Red was the 13th most commercially successful album by a New Zealand artist in the country for 2020.

== Track listing ==
All tracks are written by Jennie Skulander, Nicholai Martin, Paul Martin and Tony Vincent

Red track listing
No.	Title	Length
1.	"Do You See Birds"	3:41
2.	"All Fall Down"	3:37
3.	"Corrode"	4:14
4.	"Eyes Red Heavy"	5:06
5.	"Same Life"	3:21
6.	"The Victor"	3:38
7.	"Blood & Bone"	4:16
8.	"Endo"	4:18
9.	"Bright Lights"	4:15
10.	"Sweet Release"	4:44
11.	"Be Like the River"	4:14
12.	"Everybody's High But Me"	2:42
Total length:		58:11

== Charts ==
Weekly chart performance for Red
Chart (2020)	Peak position
New Zealand Albums (RMNZ)	2
