= Rhythm & Vines =

Annual New Zealand music festival

Rhythm and Vines
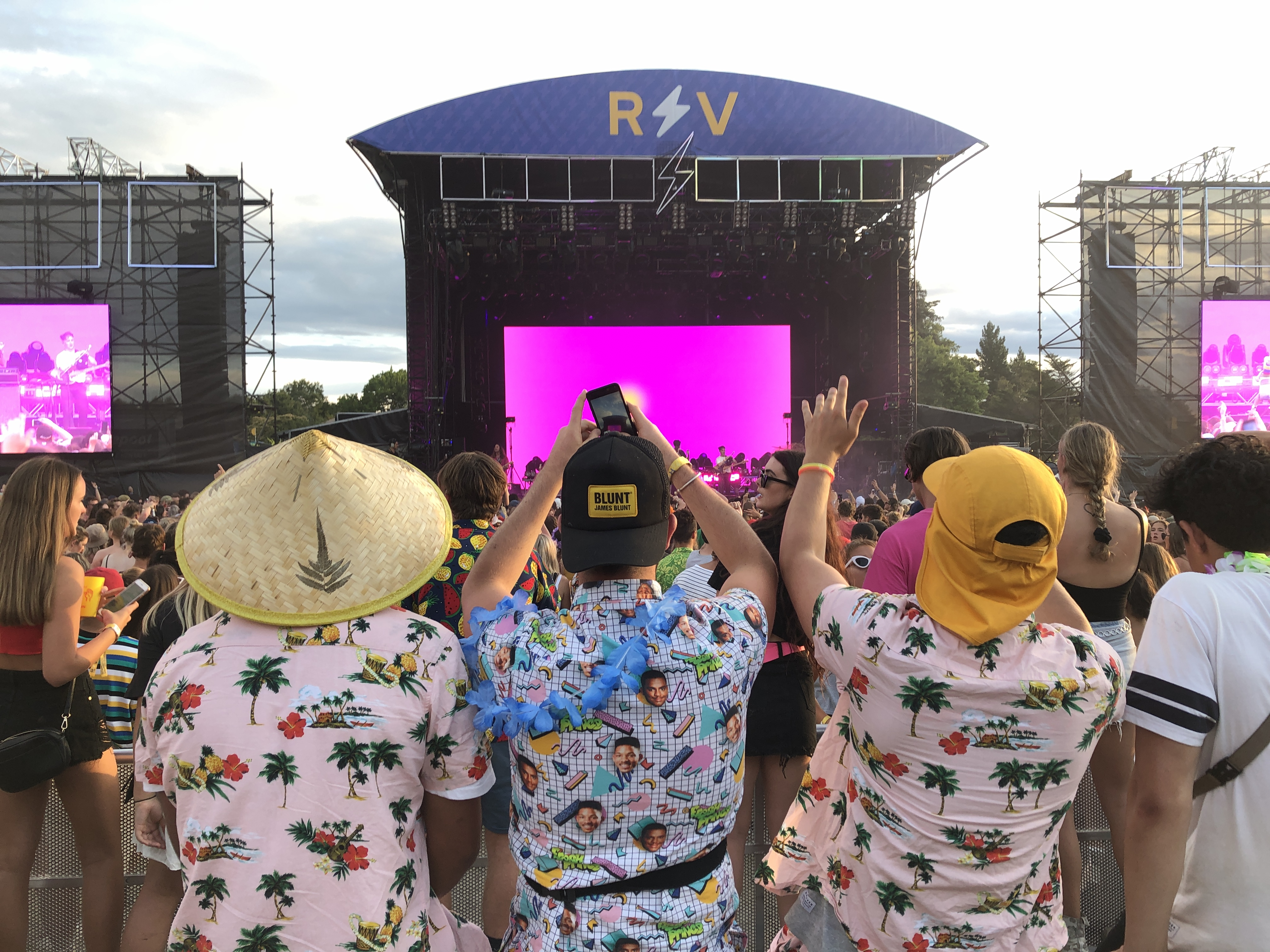
- Festival-goers at Rhythm & Vines 2018
- Dates: 29 December – 1 January (2003–2020, 2022–)
- Locations: Gisborne, New Zealand (2003–2020, 2022–2026)
- Years active: 2003–present
- Founders: Hamish Pinkham, Tom Gibson, and Andrew Witters
- Attendance: 21,000 (2018)
- Organizer: Rhythm Group Entertainment
- Website: www.rhythmandvines.co.nz

Rhythm and Vines (commonly known as R&V, RnV or Rhythm) is an annual music festival held at Waiohika Estate vineyard, 11 km (6.8 mi) northwest of Gisborne, New Zealand. The festival began in 2003 and was held for the one day of New Year's Eve until 2008 when it expanded to the three days of 29–31 December. In July 2026, Rhythm and Vines' organisers announced that the festival would move to a new undisclosed location in 2027.

== History ==
Rhythm and Vines was founded in 2003 by University of Otago friends Hamish Pinkham, Tom Gibson, and Andrew Witters. They wanted to hold an event for their university friends to celebrate the New Year in a safe and secure location where they would be entertained by New Zealand musicians. The festival has been held each year at Waiohika Estate, Witters' family home.

The first festival had one performance stage, featured dub/reggae/funk band The Black Seeds and was attended by 1800 guests. In 2004, a second stage was added and 5,500 people attended with dub/drum and bass/reggae/roots band Salmonella Dub the headline act. The 2005 event featured roots/dub/reggae/jazz/soul band Fat Freddy's Drop. The 2006 festival had four stages, featured overseas artists such as Mylo and attracted a crowd of 15,000 people.

In 2008, Rhythm and Vines expanded to a three-day event which allowed the organisers to contract bands that were not previously available. This was large factor in making the 2008–2009 festival line-up the strongest yet by far, with many renowned international acts on the bill. Accommodation for the festival is mostly provided by BW Summer Festival, a seven-day camping festival that features bands such as Flume, Kora, and State of Mind.

2010 saw Rhythm and Vines sell-out, hosting international acts such as N.E.R.D, Netsky, Chase & Status, Chromeo, Justice, Flying Lotus & Tinie Tempah along with New Zealand acts Shihad, The Naked and Famous and Dragon with a record breaking, capacity crowd of 25,000.

In 2014, Rhythm and Vines introduced the Arcadia Afterburner concert stage, brought in from Glastonbury Festival.

In 2017, Madeline Anello-Kitzmiller, from Portland, Oregon, was attending Rhythm and Vines; she was topless, having paid to have her breasts painted with glitter at a stall at the festival. While walking through the venue with a friend, a man came up behind her and groped one of her decorated breasts, then retreated to where he had been sitting. Anello-Kitzmiller and her friend retaliated by pouring a drink on the man and hitting him in the face four times. The incident, captured on video, went viral and made international news.

On 21 July 2026, the festival's organisers announced that Rhythm & Vines would move to a new undisclosed location in 2027. The festival will be hosted for the last time at Gisborne's Waiohika Estate in 2026.

== Line-ups ==
=== Episode 1 (2003) ===
Episode 1 took place on the last day of 2003. It featured The Black Seeds, The WBC, Soane, Blackbird, Paradigm, Paselode, Groundswell, Dejusa, Callam, Milk Milk Lemonade, BrazilBeat Sound System, Lophonix, and Shortcutz.

=== Episode 2 (2004) ===
Episode 2 took place on the last day of 2004. It featured Salmonella Dub, The Black Seeds, Cornerstone Roots, Greg Churchill, The WBC, Tommy, Skankamelia, Stevie G, and Andy & Tas (SYD).

=== Episode 3 (2005) ===
Episode 3 took place on the last day of 2005. It featured Salmonella Dub, Fat Freddy's Drop, The Black Seeds, Kora, Shapeshifter, Ladi 6, The WBC, Cornerstone Roots, dDub, and Taliband.

=== Episode 4 (2006) ===
Episode 4 took place on the last day of 2006. It featured Mylo, tj Katchafire, Kora, Spektrum, Shapeshifter, Ladi 6, Dick Johnson, Batucada Sound Machine, Skankamelia, One Million Dollars, Rhombus, Opensouls, Missing Link, Connan & the Mockasins, Blackbird, Electric Confectionaires, Sola Rosa, Hollie Smith, Mark De Clive-Lowe, State of Mind, Minuit, Sunrise Ceremony, Sunshine Sound System, Silverbeatz, Sandy Bay Sessions, DJ Lotion, Beat Company, Brazilbeat Sound System, Tim and Elm, DJ Phillips, Public Access, DJ Tapan, Cyril Orson, and The Rinse with DJ Moorhouse.

=== Episode 5 (2007) ===
Episode 5 took place on the last day of 2007. It featured New Young Pony Club, Scribe, Hollie Smith, Don McGlashan, M.A.N.D.Y., DJ T, State of Mind, MC Twincam, North Shore Pony Club, Automatic & Rik Blake, Blue King Brown, Concord Dawn, The Mint Chicks, The Checks, dDub, Jakob, The Tutts, Die! Die! Die!, Dick Johnson, Aural Trash (Greg Churchill & Angela Fiskin), Cyril Orson, DJ Philippa, Motocade, The Have, The Electric Confectionaires, Charlie Ash, Blackbird, Tropical Downbeat Orchestra, BrazilBeat Sound System, Ben Throp Trio, Skankamelia, Dubdoubt, and An Emerald City.

=== Episode 6 (2008) ===
Episode 6 took place on the last three days of 2008. It featured Public Enemy, The Kooks, Franz Ferdinand, Santigold, Late of the Pier (Cancelled), Jamie Lidell, DJ Nu-Mark, Mystery Jets, Shihad, Carl Cox, Ladyhawke, Fur Patrol, Digitalism, A-Trak, Adam Freeland, Ajax, An Emerald City, Anika Moa, Antix, Aquasky, DJ Audit, Bang Bang Eche, Batrider, Blackbird, The Black Seeds, Brain Slaves, Brazil Beat Soundsystem, Busy P and DJ Mehdi, Connan Mockasin, The Cribs, Cut Copy, Cut Off Your Hands, The Datsuns, Die! Die! Die!, Katchafire, Module, Motocade, P-Money, The Phoenix Foundation, The Ruby Suns, SJD, So So Modern, The Tutts, Unity Pacific, The Enright House, and Brain Slaves.

=== Episode 7 (2009) ===
Episode 7 took place on the last three days of 2009. It featured Moby, Empire of the Sun, John Butler Trio, The Checks, 2ManyDJ's (Live), Editors, Biffy Clyro (Cancelled), Roots Manuva, Future of the Left, LCD Soundsystem (DJ Set), Fake Blood, The Juan MacLean, The Proxy, Krafty Kuts, Major Lazer, Midnight Youth, Kora, Open Souls, Sola Rosa, Dane Rumble, Lisa Mitchell, P Money, White Rabbits, Ajax, Bag Raiders, Bang Gang, State of Mind, Emerson Todd, Dick Johnson, Antiform, PNC, Optimus Gryme, Family Cactus, Computers Want Me Dead, Emerald City, Dictaphone Blues, Bionic Pixie, Brand New Math, Six60, Blackbird, Dan Aux, Tim Richards, Joel Armstrong, Cam Robertson, Aural Trash, Logan Baker, Vital Soundsystem, Brazilbeat Soundsystem, Dan Farley, Bondi House DJ's, Dean Campbell, Jason Howson, Mikey Havok, P Vans, Nick D, R.I.A, Cool Kids Club, ThirtyEightFourty, Shirtpants, Maya & Vanya, Alex Bull, Aroha, Beat Mafia, Ange, DJ Hat, DJ Lotion, DJ Robba & MC Dreadeye, ELM, Flex, Snowy, and Jonas.

=== Episode 8 (2010) ===
Episode 8 took place on the last three days of 2010. It featured N.E.R.D., Justice, Shihad, Carl Cox, The Gaslamp Killer, Chase & Status (DJ set), Chromeo, Boys Noize, Erol Alkan, Netsky, Flying Lotus, Mystery Jets, High Contrast, Tinie Tempah, Miami Horror, Hollie Smith, Hudson Mohawke, Flip Grater, BARB, Bulletproof, P-Money, Electric Wire Hustle, Mt Eden Dubstep, Dick Johnson, Blackbird, Afternoon Raj, Dragon, Tim Richards, Chaos in the CBD, Optimus Gryme and Our:House Presents.

=== Episode 9 (2011) ===
Episode took place on the last three days of 2011. On 29 December, it featured Pendulum, Grandmaster Flash, Yuksek, Architecture in Helsinki, Zowie, Danny Byrd, Dick Johnson, The Ruby Suns, Die! Die! Die!, Nick D, Sampology (AV/DJ set), 1814, Ethnic Roots, Urulu, Chaos in The CBD, Philippa, Frank Booker, Grayson Gilmore, and Brazil Beat Sound System. On 30 December, it featured Calvin Harris, Erick Morillo, Cut Copy, A Skillz, Six60, Foreign Beggars, DJ Zinc, Busy P, 12th Planet, She's So Rad, JStar, Homebrew, Eddie Numbers, Julien Dyne, Aural Trash, Scratch 22, Earl Gateshead, Jesse Sheehan, and Jeremy Toy. On 31 December, it featured Example and DJ Wire, Skream and Benga, Youngman, Tiga, Netsky, Beardyman, The Jordan Luck Band, Jack Beats, Kids of 88, Electric Wire Hustle, David Dallas, Ruby Frost, Recloose, Jillionaire, People of Paris, Pikachunes, The Thomas Oliver Band, Antix Live, Our:House DJs, Tim Richards, Thomas Sahs, and Blackbird.

=== Episode 10 (2012) ===
Episode 10 took place on the last three days of 2012. It featured Kimbra, Knife Party, Netsky, Chase & Status, Mark Ronson, High Contrast, Logistics, Camo & Krooked, S.P.Y, MC Wrec, The Presets, Six60, araabMUZIK, tj Maya Jane Coles, Disclosure, Tame Impala, The Black Seeds, Chali 2na, P-Money, Ruby Frost, Parachute Youth, Two Cartoons, The Kaleidoscopes, Dan Aux, Eddie Numbers, and Five Mile Town.

=== Episode 11 (2013) ===
Episode 11 took place on the last three days of 2013. It featured a DJ set by Rudimental, Wiz Khalifa, Empire of the Sun, Shapeshifter, Flux Pavilion, Dynamite MC, Kill The Noise, Julio Bashmore, Hermitude, Chet Faker, Stanton Warriors, The Veils, Ayah Marar Live, Wilkinson, DJ Zinc, Hospitality presents: Camo & Krooked, High Contrast, Danny Byrd and Metrik, Mightyfools, Dusky, Soul Clap, Wolf + Lamb, Kode9, The Phoenix Foundation, David Dallas, @Peace, Concord Dawn, P-Money, Tahuna Breaks, Tomorrow People, Louis Baker, Weird Together, PleasePlease, Benny Tipene, The Remains, Aroha, Paprika and the Saltshakers, Boycrush, Chaos in the CBD, Connor Nestor, CTFD, Dan Aux Live, Daniel Farley, Diaz Grimm, DPTRCLB DJS, Frank Booker Live, High Hoops, Julien Dyne, Jetski Safari, Luke Walker, Matt Drake, MayaVanya, Sam Fitzgerald, Sam Hill, She's So Rad (special disco set), Stack and Piece, Sweet Mix Kids, The Beat Mafia, The Lost Boys, Jay Knight, Tim Richards, Times x Two, Tommy Flowers, and Young Tapz.

=== Episode 12 (2014) ===
Episode 12 took place on the last three days of 2014. It featured Chase and Status, Bastille, Netsky, Zane Lowe, Chet Faker, Danny Brown, Action Bronson, Just Blaze, Broods, Ta-Ku, Jagwar Ma, London Elektricity & MC Wrec, MØ, DC Breaks, P-Money, Mr. Carmack, Etc.!Etc.!, The Cuban Brothers, State of Mind, Addison Groove, Ayah Marar, PNC, DJ Zinc, Kink (live), Meta & The Cornerstones, Little May, Midland, The Funk Brothers, Estère, Kamandi, Team Dynamite, Third3Eye, Young Tapz, Yumi Zouma, and Holly Arrowsmith.

Rhythm and Vines introduced the Arcadia Afterburner concert stage.

=== Episode 13 (2015) ===
Episode 13 took place on the last three days of 2015. It featured Angus & Julia Stone, Astronaut, Barely Alive, Brendon Thomas & The Vibes, Concord Dawn, Cori Gonzalez-Macuer, Cut Snake, Dan Aux, Dave Dobbyn, David Dallas, Diaz Grimm, Dimension, Diskord, Dodge & Fuski, Dubloadz, Eastern Bloc, Emergency DJ Clint Golden Features, Ha The Unclear, Hollie Smith, Jamie Bowen, Jupiter Project, Kamandi, Kove, Matt Stellingwerf, Nero DJ Set, P-Money, Peking Duk, Pendulum DJ Set & Verse, PNC, Race Banyon, RL Grime, Sachi, Scribe, Slumberjack, Sniffers, State of Mind, Sticky Fingers, Sub Focus DJ Set & ID, Summer Thieves, Terace, The Black Club with Mac Mylo, Tim Phin, Virtual Riot, Will Wood, Wuki, Yung Lean, and Zeds Dead.

Headliner Mac Miller was scheduled to perform on the 29th, but cancelled a few days before the event.

=== Episode 14 (2016) ===
Episode 14 took place on the last three days of 2016. It featured Chance The Rapper, ZHU, Rüfüs Du Sol, Wilkinson, Netsky, Getter, GoldLink, Denzel Curry, Dusky, Skream, Hot Chip, AC Slater, S.P.Y, Savage, The Jordan Luck Band, P-Money, Sachi, Yoko-Zuna, Pacific Heights, Anna Coddington, Three, Houses Down, Bailey Wiley, Eno X Dirty, Montel2099, Stack & Piece, Heidi, Cut Snake, Aroha, Tali, Baynk, Chores, Dan Aux, Died in 69, Ian Munro, Lee Mvtthews, Maala, Name UL, Quix, Sniffers DJs, Kimbra, Culture Shock, Oscar Key Sung, Beat Mafia, Kinetic, Mitch James, Terace, Maribou State, Ocean Alley, Alae, Eastern Bloc, Ekko Park, Gromz, Kings, Summer Thieves, Wade Unlucky, Cases And Bad Breed and Slo:Wave.

=== Episode 15 (2017) ===
Episode 15 took place on the last three days of 2017. It featured artists and bands such as Schoolboy Q, 2manydjs, Baauer, Mura Masa, Client Liaison, Giggs, Michael Dapaah as Big Shaq, Netsky, Wilkinson, Sub Focus, Tiga, A-Trak, B.Traits, Boombox Cartel, Camo & Crooked, Cut Snake, DJ T., David Dallas, Dick Johnson, Felix da Housecat, High Contrast, Javi Bora, P-Money, and many more.

=== Episode 16 (2018) ===
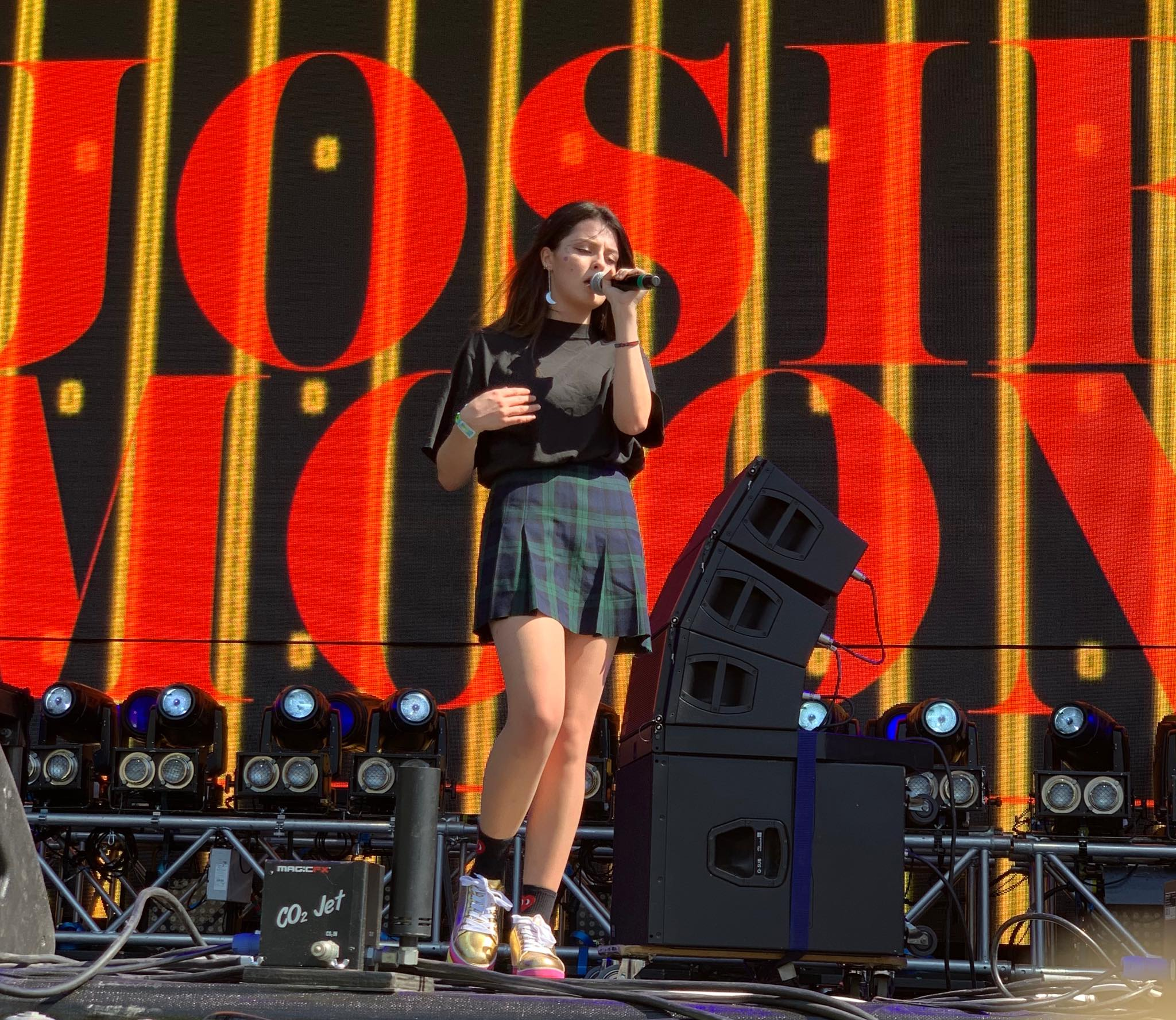
Josie Moon singing at Rhythm & Vines 2018

Episode 16 took place on the last three days of December 2018. It featured Vince Staples, Kyle, Juice Wrld, Flight Facilities, Duke Dumont, Bob Moses, Sonny Fodera, Tchami × Malaa, Bicep, Wilkinson, Sigma, Sasasas, Che Fu, James Zabiela, Openside and more.

=== Episode 17 (2019) ===
Episode 17 took place on the last three days of December 2019. It featured Disclosure, Alison Wonderland, Playboi Carti, RL Grime, Wilkinson, Andy C, Jauz, and Green Velvet.

=== Episode 18 (2020) ===
Episode 18 took place on the last three days of December 2020. It featured Benee, Fat Freddy's Drop, Quix, Montell 2099, Broods, Sachi, Alix Perez, Shapeshifter, Shihad, Dave Dobbyn, Lee Mvtthews, and State of Mind.

=== Episode 19 (2021) ===
Episode 19 was postponed to Easter 2022 after being postponed due to COVID-19, with the New Zealand Government making vaccine passports mandatory for attendees of Summer Festivals. It was originally scheduled to take place on the last three days in December 2021.

=== Episode 20 (2022) ===
Episode 20 took place on the last three days of December 2022. It featured Chase & Status, Camelphat, Andy C, Dimension (live), Bonobo (live), Skream, Alison Wonderland, Friction, and special guest Dizzee Rascal.

=== Episode 21 (2023) ===
Episode 21 took place on the last three days of December 2023. It featured Central Cee, Dom Dolla, Hedex, Wilkinson, Peking Duk, Delta Heavy, Sub Focus, and Becky Hill.

=== Episode 22 (2024) ===
Episode 22 took place on the last three days of December 2024. It featured Ice Spice, Pendulum (DJ Set), RL Grime, and Dave Dobbyn.

=== Episode 23 (2025) ===
Episode 23 took place on the last three days of December 2025. It featured Kid Cudi, Turnstile, Mozey, L.A.B, Maribou State, 070 Shake, Lee Mvtthews, Sota, Wilkinson, Cyril, Kanine, Notion, and Montell2099.

=== Episode 24 (2026) ===
Episode 24 will take place on the last three days of December 2026. It will feature John Summit, KI/KI, Netsky, 1991, Benee, Luude, Mall Grab, Dave Dobbyn, and Vince Staples.

It will be the last occurrence of the festival at its original Waiohika Estate venue before it moves to a new location in 2027.

== Rhythm & Alps ==
Rhythm & Alps (commonly known as R&A) is the South Island partner festival of Rhythm & Vines held in the Cardrona Valley, near Wānaka, New Zealand.

== Rhythm & Sands ==
Rhythm & Sands (commonly known as R&S) was the international partner festival of Rhythm & Vines held in Ko Pha-ngan, southern Thailand. It ran from 2011 to 2013.
