= Last Night You Saw This Band =

Studio album by Minuit
- Released: 21 December 2012
- Genre: Electronic
- Length: 39:55
- Label: Dollhouse Records
- Producers: Ryan Beehre & Paul Dodge

Minuit chronology
Find Me Before I Die a Lonely Death.com (2009)	Last Night You Saw This Band (2012)

Last Night You Saw This Band is the fourth album from New Zealand electronic band Minuit, which was released on 21 December 2012 by Dollhouse Records.

== Track listing ==
1. "Last Night You Saw This Band"
2. "Book of the Dead"
3. "Islands"
4. "What We Know"
5. "Good Ol' Days"
6. "The Love That Won't Shut Up"
7. "Ghost"
8. "Stories for Boys"
9. "Heaven"
10. "Warheads"
11. "Sisters on the Balcony"
12. "Sit Down Beside Me"
