= Sachi (band) =

New Zealand electronic music duo

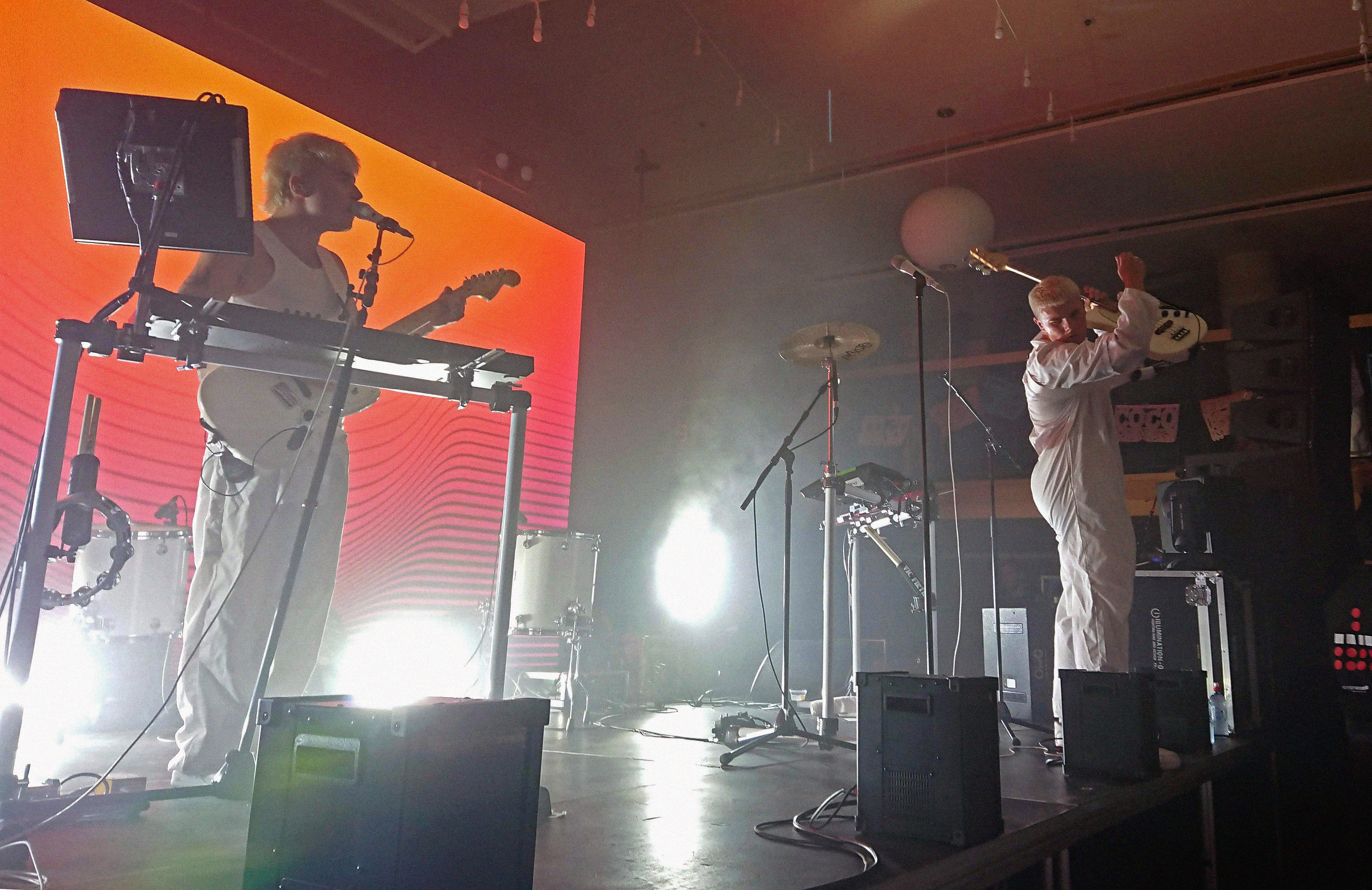
- Chrisp (left) and Thomas (right) in 2019

Background information
- Origin: Auckland, New Zealand
- Genres: EDM, pop, indie electronic
- Years active: 2014–present
- Label: Casablanca Records
- Publisher: Universal Music Group
- Members: Nick Chrisp; Will Thomas

Sachi (stylised as SACHI) are an electronic dance music duo from Auckland, New Zealand, composed of musicians Nick Chrisp (born 11 December 1997) and Will Thomas (born 22 March 1998).

Labelled one of New Zealand's most celebrated live acts, they are renowned for mixing live instruments into their DJ sets, and incorporating elements of indie electronic, house, and trap into their songwriting.

== Background ==
Chrisp and Thomas met in primary school and played in rock bands together before developing an interest in producing electronic and hip-hop music on Ableton in their early teens. At sixteen, they formed SACHI while at high school.

SACHI first gained prominence after throwing a USB demo through the car window of American producer Diplo outside an Auckland restaurant in November 2015; six months later he played one of their tracks on his BBC Radio 1 show.

Their first official release was their Lunch with Bianca EP in July 2016; its lead single, "South Central" with American rapper Duckwrth, was debuted by Zane Lowe on Beats 1. They followed up with a number of singles and their second EP, 2019's Nights With Ruby, collaborating with artists such as Mick Jenkins, E^ST, and Naïka. Their third EP, Breakfast With Ella, was released in 2021.

SACHI are renowned for their live performances in New Zealand, playing at major festivals including Rhythm and Vines, Bay Dreams, Homegrown, and Northern Bass, as well as touring internationally with Netsky. In 2022, they became the first New Zealand act to perform at Tomorrowland festival in Belgium.

== Discography ==
=== Extended Plays ===
Title	Year	Peak chart position		Ref.
Title	Year	NZ Top 40	Top 20 Aotearoa	Ref.
Lunch With Bianca	2016	18	4	
Nights With Ruby	2019	—	—	
Breakfast With Ella	2021	—	19	

=== Notable singles ===
Title	Year	Peak chart positions		Ref.
Title	Year	NZ Top 40	Top 20 Aotearoa	Ref.
"South Central" (feat. Duckwrth)	2016	—	—	
"No More" (feat. Zoe and Sysyi)	2016	—	11	
"Lowkey" (feat. Mick Jenkins)	2017	—	11	
"Ride" (feat. Thomston)	2017	—	14	
"Shelter" (feat. Nïka)	2017	—	4	
"Hollywood Angel" (feat. E^ST)	2018	—	—	
"Love Me Now" (feat. Cxloe)	2019	—	—	
"Sparking My Fire" (feat. ROE)	2019	—	—	
"Worst Behaviour" (feat. Sam DeRosa)	2019	37	19	
"Enchanté" (feat. Naïka)	2020	—	—	
"Take Me Back"	2021	—	—	
"Feel Good" (feat. Mali-Koa)	2023	—	—	
"Those Tears" (feat. Gudfella and BIM)	2023	—	—	
"Whole Again"	2023	—	15	
"405" (feat. LATASHÁ)	2024	—	—	
"Wildfire"	2024	—	—	
"Hand of God"	2024	—	—	
"Waiting All Night"	2025	—	—	

== Awards and nominations ==
Year	Award	Work(s) Nominated	Category	Result	Ref.
2016	Aotearoa Music Awards	Lunch With Bianca	Breakthrough Artist of the Year	Nominated	
