= Yours Truly (song) =

Single by Blindspott

from the album End The Silence
- Released: 8 April 2005
- Recorded: 2005
- Genre: Alternative metal
- Length: 3:29
- Label: Capitol

Blindspott singles chronology
"Yours Truly" (2005)	"Drown" (2006)

Music video
- "Yours Truly" on YouTube

"Yours Truly" is a single by Blindspott released in 2005. It is the fourth track on the band's second album, End the Silence. It peaked at number nine on the New Zealand singles chart.

== Track listing ==
1. "Yours Truly (Radio Edit)"
2. "Yours Truly (Alternate Ending)"
3. "Yours Truly (MPEG Video)"
