= Latashá =

American rapper, singer, and record producer

- Also known as: L.A.
- Born: Latasha Alcindor Brooklyn, New York, U.S.
- Genre: Hip hop
- Occupations: Rapper; singer; songwriter; record producer
- Years active: 2011–present
- Website: callmelatasha.com

Latashá (born Latasha Alcindor, 1988), also credited as LATASHA and known early in her career as L.A., is an American rapper, singer, songwriter, and record producer from Brooklyn, New York. Active in New York's independent hip hop scene since the early 2010s, she became known as an early adopter of non-fungible tokens (NFTs) in music, serving as head of community programming at the NFT platform Zora and founding the educational event series Zoratopia.

== Early life ==
Alcindor is Afro-Latina, of Panamanian, Jamaican, Puerto Rican, and Haitian descent, and grew up in the Flatbush neighborhood of Brooklyn, New York. She began performing in her early twenties while working day jobs, developing her live act at New York performance spaces including National Sawdust and The Shed.

== Career ==
=== Early releases (2011–2020) ===
Alcindor came to hip hop by way of performance art, and began releasing music in 2011 under the name L.A., derived from her initials, with the mixtapes The Presentation and The L.A. Riots: Mental Fatality. Performing as Latasha Alcindor, she went on to release the EP Spark (2014), Loosies & Blunts (2015), B(LA)K, and the 2017 mixtape Teen Nite at Empire, a concept record named after Brooklyn's Empire Roller Skating Center. She performed at festivals including South by Southwest and the Brooklyn Hip-Hop Festival, opened for artists including Big Sean, Princess Nokia, Ghostface Killah, and Q-Tip, and presented the performance piece All A Dream: Intro to LATASHA at the Brooklyn Museum. In 2018, Brooklyn Magazine named her in its "30 Under 30" list.

After relocating to Los Angeles, she released the singles "Who I Am" and "GoGo Wyne" in 2020. "Who I Am" was featured in the Netflix miniseries Self Made: Inspired by the Life of Madam C.J. Walker, whose soundtrack of Black women artists also included Janelle Monáe, Queen Latifah, and Little Simz; she credited the placement to her publishing work with the music licensing company Sugaroo!.

=== Web3 and Zora (2021–2023) ===
In February 2021, Latashá minted her first NFT, a music video for her 2017 song "Ilikedat..", on the platform Zora. NFT sales of her videos for "GoGo Wyne" and "Glo Up" generated nearly $100,000, and she was subsequently hired as Zora's head of community programming, founding Zoratopia, an educational event series held in cities across the United States and at gatherings such as NFT.NYC and Art Basel Miami.

Her advocacy for artist ownership through NFTs drew coverage from outlets including Time, Vice, BET, and Forbes, and nft now named her to its NFT100 list of influential figures in the space in 2023. She appeared in Minted, a documentary about the NFT market broadcast on PBS's Independent Lens. A trailer for her audiovisual project START HERE. was included in "My Body, My Business", a 2023 Sotheby's benefit auction curated by Pussy Riot founder Nadya Tolokonnikova, and in 2025 she held an artist residency at the Ace Hotel & Swim Club in Palm Springs, presenting the exhibition muva_nature during Coachella weekend.

=== Collaborations and Out Here (2022–present) ===
Latashá was featured on Pussy Riot's 2022 single "Laugh It Off" alongside VÉRITÉ, Honey Dijon's "Don't Be Afraid", and New Zealand duo SACHI's "405" (2024), a collaboration arranged by Nick Littlemore of Empire of the Sun.

In 2026, she released the singles "WAVE" and "PPNE" ahead of her next album; "WAVE" begins in the boom bap style of her earlier New York work before opening into more psychedelic production.

== Awards ==
Year	Award	Category	Result
2025	Hollywood Independent Music Awards	Producer/Production	Won

== Discography ==
=== Projects ===
- The Presentation (2011)
- The L.A. Riots: Mental Fatality (2011)
- Spark (2014)
- Loosies & Blunts (2015)
- B(LA)K
- Teen Nite at Empire (2017)

=== Selected singles ===
- "Ol' BK Soul" (featuring Radamiz, 2017)
- "Who I Am" (2020)
- "GoGo Wyne" (2020)
- "Laugh It Off" (Pussy Riot featuring VÉRITÉ and Latashá, 2022)
- "Don't Be Afraid" (Honey Dijon featuring Latashá, 2022)
- "405" (SACHI featuring Latashá, 2024)
- "WAVE" (2026)
- "PPNE" (2026)
