= Devilskin =

New Zealand alternative metal band

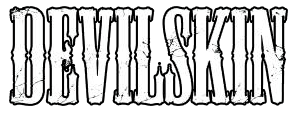

Background information
- Origin: Hamilton, New Zealand
- Genres: Alternative metal; heavy metal; hard rock
- Years active: 2010–present
- Labels: Devilskin Ltd; Rhythm; DRM; Rodeostar (worldwide releases)
- Members: Jennie Skulander; Tony Vincent; Paul Martin; Nic Martin
- Past members: Rob McWhanell
- Website: devilskin.co.nz

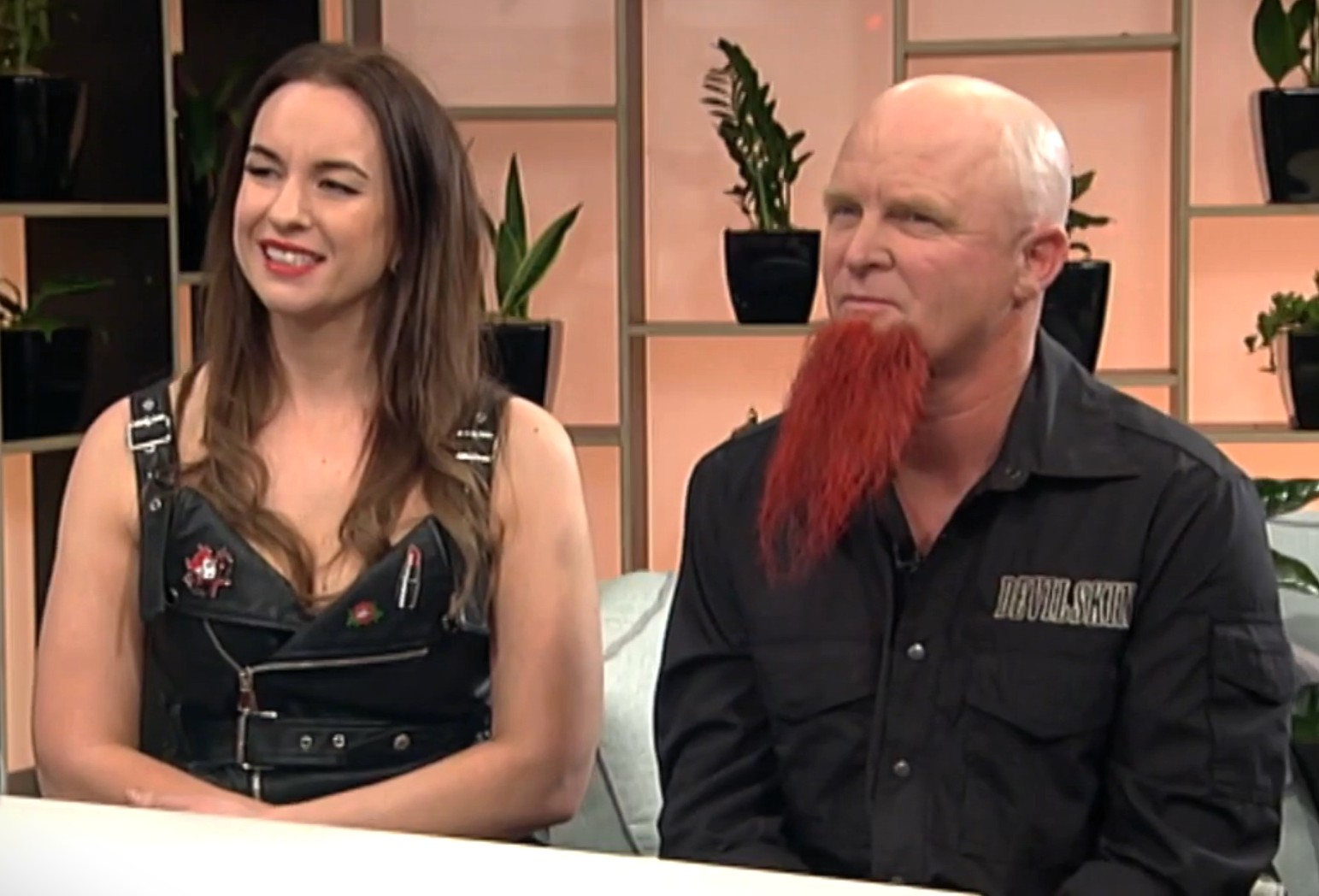
Left to right: Jennie Skulander, Tony "Nail" Vincent, in 2018

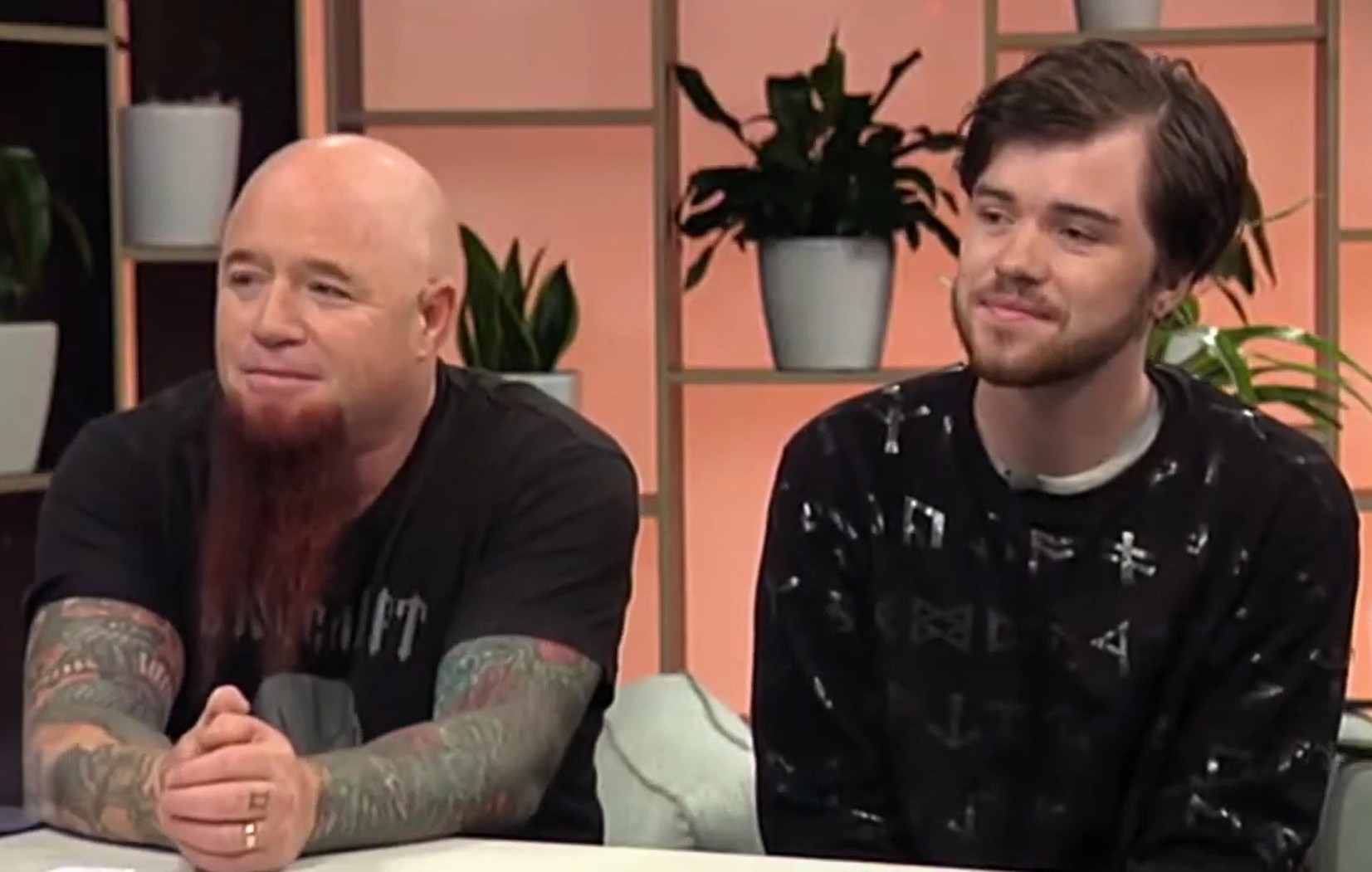
Left to right: Paul Martin, Nic Martin, in 2018

Devilskin is a four-piece alternative metal band from Hamilton, New Zealand, formed in June 2010. The band consists of lead vocalist Jennie Skulander, guitarist Tony "Nail" Vincent, bassist Paul Martin and drummer Nic Martin.

Devilskin's debut album, We Rise was released on 11 July 2014 and peaked at #1 on the Official New Zealand Music Chart, and spent 47 weeks in the chart. It was certified Platinum by Recorded Music NZ in March 2015. The band's sophomore album, Be Like the River, was released on 11 November 2016 and also peaked at #1.

== History ==
=== Early years (2010–2013) ===
Devilskin originated in Hamilton, New Zealand in 2010. Founding member Paul Martin was going through bands that were sent to him to play on his The Axe Attack radio show and found a demo from a Rotorua band called Slipping Tongue, with member Jennie Skulander on vocals. Martin bumped into Skulander in Hamilton in 2010, moving there after the breakup of Slipping Tongue. After much persistence from Martin, they both agreed to form a band, enlisting Nail Vincent from Chuganaut (one of Hamilton's leading hard rock bands) and local drummer, Rob McWhanell, to play drums for the band. After a few shows, Rob was involved in a motorcycle accident and need to have an operation, forcing Martin to "press-gang" his son, Nic Martin, into temporarily replacing him. The band then decided to take on Nic as the full-time drummer. With the band lineup settled, Vincent and Paul Martin solidified the Devilskin image by adopting their distinctive pink goatees.

Devilskin released 'Little Pills' on YouTube in 2012 to positive reviews, eventually getting second in the 2014 The Rock 1000, a countdown of the best 1000 rock songs as voted by listeners.

=== We Rise and subsequent tour (2014–2015) ===
The writing of material for We Rise occurred over a period of several years. The album was recorded within three weeks at York Street Studios in Auckland. In May 2014, Devilskin released the single 'Start a Revolution', peaking at 28 on the NZ Singles Chart. Following this they released their debut album, We Rise debuting at number 1 on the national album chart in 2014, knocking Ed Sheeran's X album off the top of the chart, and became the nation's biggest selling independent release of the year. By March 2015, We Rise went platinum, having sold over 15,000 copies, being the first NZ rock/metal album to do so since Shihad's Killjoy album 18 years prior. We Rise stayed in the national album Chart for 95 weeks from 2014 to 2016.

The band accompanied We Rise with the live CD/DVD Live At The Powerstation' which debuted at number 12 on the NZ Album Chart in December 2014 and stayed on the chart for eight weeks.

=== Mountains and Be Like the River (2015–2017) ===
After sold-out album tour for We Rise and an eight-date 'Summer Surrender' tour in late 2014, Devilskin went offshore to play a series of promotional gigs, where they attracted the attention of international record companies and festival organisers, where they played the iconic Whisky a Go Go. The band returned home after this tour, to record to release a follow-up single Mountains, recorded whilst they were over in England. Following the supporting Mountains and the Moon tour, the band went to England to finish fully recording their follow-up album, Be Like the River. The album's first single, "Pray" was released on 11 August 2016. The full album was later released on 11 November 2016, and peaked at #1 on the Official New Zealand Music Chart, like its predecessor. To follow the album release, Devilskin went on a promotional tour, opening for acts such as Airbourne and playing at festivals such as the Download Festival.

=== NZ/UK tour and new single (2018) ===
At the start of 2018, the band announced their New Year 2018 tour, with Skinny Hobos and Seas of Conflict as opening acts. The band also played some new material throughout this concert. On 28 June, Devilskin announced their New Zealand and European tours via their Facebook page. In an interview with Paul Martin, he said he would like to take some of the band's new material "on a road test", opening up the potential for new music from the band. An interview with lead singer Jennie Skulander also confirmed this.

On 7 September, Devilskin announced their new single "Endo". Skulander has stated the song is about her surgery for Stage 4 endometriosis. The song was also played throughout their NZ tour, along with some new material. This was followed up with the release of "All Fall Down" on 5 April.

=== Red (2020) ===
On 17 January 2020 Devilskin announced the forthcoming release of their third album Red, along with a new single, "Corrode". This was released to streaming platforms on 3 April 2020 with the plan to follow up with an appearance at Homegrown Music Festival and an international tour. However, due to the impact of the coronavirus pandemic in New Zealand this, along with physical disc copies, has been postponed.

=== Re-Evolution (2025) ===
On 11 July 2025, Devilskin released their fourth album, Re-Evolution.

== Musical style and influences ==
Lead singer Jennie Skulander has said that her influences include artists such as Mike Patton, Freddie Mercury, Ronnie James Dio, Cedric Bixler-Zavala, Claudio Sanchez and Jeff Buckley, to name a few. The band itself lists Saidaya, Subtract, 8 Foot Sativa, Cripple Mr Onion, Team Kill, World War Four and 8-Forty-8 as inspiration during the recording of their debut album; We Rise.

== Band members ==
=== Current members ===
- Jennie Skulander – lead vocals (2010–present)
- Tony 'Nail' Vincent – guitars, backing vocals (2010–present)
- Paul Martin – bass, backing vocals (2010–present)
- Nic Martin – drums, piano (2010–present)

=== Former members ===
- Robbie McWhannell – drums (2010)

== Awards and nominations ==
=== New Zealand Music Awards ===
- 2014: Best Rock Album – "We Rise" (nominated)
- 2014: Breakthrough Artist of the Year (nominated)
- 2014: Best Engineer – "Clint Murphy" (nominated)
- 2017: Best Rock Album – "Be Like the River" (won)
- 2017: Best Group (nominated)
- 2017: Best Engineer – "Clint Murphy" (won)

== Discography ==
=== Albums ===
Devilskin's debut album We Rise was ranked at number 8 on Recorded Music NZ's year-end album chart for 2014, and at number 40 for 2015.

Year	Title	Details	Peak chart positions	Certifications
Year	Title	Details	NZ	Certifications
2014	We Rise	Released: 11 July 2014; Label: Devilskin/Rhythm/DRM/Rodeostar (worldwide re-issue)	1	NZ: Platinum
2014	Live at the Powerstation	Released: 21 November 2014; Label: Devilskin/Rhythm/DRM	12	
2016	Be Like the River	Released: 11 November 2016; Label: Devilskin/Rhythm/DRM	1	NZ: Gold
2020	Red	Released: 3 April 2020; Label: Devilskin/Rhythm/DRM	2	
2025	Re-Evolution	Released: 11 July 2025; Label: Devilskin/Rhythm/DRM	1	

=== EPs ===
Year	Title	Details	Peak chart positions
Year	Title	Details	NZ
2024	Surfacing	Released: 3 May 2024; Label: Devilskin/Rhythm/DRM	4

=== Singles ===
Year	Title	Peak chart positions	Album
Year	Title	NZ	Album
2012	"Little Pills"	—	We Rise
2013	"Never See the Light"	—	We Rise
2014	"Start a Revolution"	28	We Rise
2014	"Fade"	—	We Rise
2015	"Mountains"	—	Be Like the River
2016	"Pray"	— (Note: "Pray" did not enter the NZ Top 40 Singles Chart, but peaked at number 7 on the NZ Heatseekers Singles Chart.)	Be Like the River
2016	"Grave"	—	Be Like the River
2017	"Believe in Me"	—	Be Like the River
2017	"Animal"	—	Be Like the River
2018	"Endo"	— (Note: "Endo" did not enter the NZ Top 40 Singles Chart, but peaked at number 8 on the NZ Hot NZ Singles Chart.)	Red
2019	"All Fall Down"	— (Note: "All Fall Down" did not enter the NZ Top 40 Singles Chart, but peaked at number 1 on the NZ Hot NZ Singles Chart.)	Red
2020	"Corrode"	—	Red
2020	"Everybody's High But Me"	— (Note: "Everybody's High But Me" did not enter the NZ Top 40 Singles Chart, but peaked at number 15 on the NZ Hot NZ Singles Chart.)	Red
2024	"Barracuda"	— (Note: "Barracuda" did not enter the NZ Top 40 Singles Chart, but peaked at number 23 on the NZ Hot NZ Singles Chart.)	Non-album singles
2025	"Half-Life of Dreams"	— (Note: "Half-Life of Dreams" did not enter the NZ Top 40 Singles Chart, but peaked at number 37 on the NZ Hot NZ Singles Chart.)	Non-album singles
