= Mode. Set. Clear. =

Studio album by Villainy
- Released: 19 October 2012
- Recorded: 2011–2012
- Studio: Studios in the City, Salt Studios, Melbourne, Roundhead Studios, Auckland, STL Audio, Wellington.
- Genre: Alternative rock, alternative metal
- Length: 49:16
- Producer: Tom Larkin

Villainy chronology
Mode. Set. Clear. (2012)	Dead Sight (2015)

Singles from Mode. Set. Clear.
- 1. "Alligator Skin"; 2. "The Answer"; 3. "Gather Yourselves"; 4. "Another Time"; 5. "Ammunition"

Mode. Set. Clear. is the debut album by New Zealand alternative rock band Villainy, released in New Zealand on 19 October 2012, and distributed by Universal Records. The album received the award for Best Rock Album at the 2013 New Zealand Music Awards.

== Track listing ==
No.	Title	Length
1.	"Alligator Skin"	4:00
2.	"Gather Yourselves"	3:53
3.	"Mode. Set. Clear."	5.16
4.	"Another Time"	4:49
5.	"The Answer"	4:09
6.	"Paradise Lost"	4:05
7.	"Money Mouth"	3:00
8.	"More Than You Can Do"	5:43
9.	"Monday Night Fright Night"	3:50
10.	"Ammunition"	4:46
11.	"Deliver Me"	5:31
Total length:		49:16

== Personnel ==
Adapted from the liner notes.

Villainy

- Neill Fraser – guitar, vocals, piano
- Dave Johnston – drums, percussion
- Thomas Watts – guitar
- James Dylan – bass

Production

- Tom Larkin – producer, mixing, recording, drums and percussion ("Paradise Lost)
- Ben Ehrenberg – engineer, additional production
- Jordan Stone – assistant engineer (Auckland)
- Ben Ehrenberg – mixing ("Monday Night Fright Night")
- Dave Johnston – additional recording (Auckland)
- Matt Keller – additional recording (Auckland)
- Luke Benge – upright piano ("Another Time" and "More Than You Can Do")
- John Ruberto – mastering
- Storm Thorgerson – cover design and photography
- Peter Curzon – cover design and photography
- Lee Baker – cover design and photography

== Charts ==
Chart (2012)	Peak position
New Zealand Top 20 New Zealand Albums Chart	1
New Zealand Top 40 Albums Chart	8
