= Paul Martin (radio presenter) =

New Zealand radio DJ and musician

Paul 'The Axeman' Martin
- Born: New Zealand
- Presenting career
- Show: The Axe Attack
- Station: The Rock
- Time slot: 8:00 p.m. – 11:00 p.m. Sunday
- Style: Disc jockey
- Country: New Zealand

Paul 'The Axeman' Martin is a New Zealand radio DJ and musician, and former DJ for The Rock. It began in Hamilton and later moved to Auckland. Over the years the station has been networked around New Zealand. The station broadcasts rock music from "the '80s, '90s and now".

== Career ==
Martin was one of The Rock's longest serving jocks, presenting, programming and producing his weekly metal show The Axe Attack on the Rock since 1992.

He has interviewed Slayer, Metallica, Fear Factory, Sepultura, Megadeth, Anthrax, Suicidal Tendencies, Lita Ford, Deftones, Rob Halford, Steve Vai and Max Cavalera.

He writes for New Zealand music Rip It Up magazine as well as Australia's Tattoos DownUnder. Martin started his own record label "HELLMAN RECORDS" to promote New Zealand music. His first CD release The Axe Attack New Zealand Metal Vol.1 boasts 16 New Zealand metal acts.

Until early 2006 he was a DJ at Hamilton metal bar, 6 Feet Under.

Martin is still based in Hamilton in the Waikato and used to commute to Auckland on Sundays to do the Axe Attack live.

== Affiliations ==
Martin is a member of NZ's Heavily Tattooed Club.

== Albums ==
Martin has released albums with Knightshade and Blackjack and currently plays in a new agro metal band World War Four. World War Four has supported notable acts such as Black Label Society, Down, Heaven and Hell, and Motorhead, and opened New Zealand's 1st International Guitar Festival 2008 alongside Uli Jon Roth (Scorpions), Alex Skolnick (Testament), Glenn Hughes (Deep Purple), Joe Satriani, Gilbey Clarke, Vernon Reid.

He also performs in The Fabulous Farrelli Bros with the rest of the Rock jocks and often pops up with cover band Head First.

In 2010, Martin joined New Zealand alternative metal band Devilskin as the band's bass player.
