= Bang! Bang! Eche! =

New Zealand alternative rock band

- Origin: Christchurch, New Zealand
- Genres: indie, alternative rock
- Years active: 2007–2013
- Members: T'Nealle Worsley; Charlie Ryder; James Sullivan; Zach Doney
- Website: bangbangeche.com

Bang! Bang! Eche! were an alternative rock band from Christchurch, New Zealand, active between 2007 and 2013.

== History ==
The band started playing shows in early 2007. Towards the end of 2007, the band wrote and recorded a self-titled demo EP. The EP placed in the Top 5 Most Added Albums on US College Radio. It also gained rotation on US radio station KEXP, with single "4 to the Floor" played widely. The band were also played heavily on Australian network Triple J, and had two number one songs ("4 to the Floor" and "Nikee") on the alternative New Zealand b.net radio network. The songs "4 to the Floor" and "Time Mismanagement" charted on the NZ Industry Radioscope chart for 21 weeks in 2008, peaking at #3 and #2 respectively.

In late 2008, the band toured the United States and Europe, while 2009 saw the band tour Australia, Europe and the United States extensively. This included slots at festivals including Rhythm and Vines, Big Day Out, Homegrown Music Festival, South By Southwest, The Great Escape, and CMJ for the second consecutive year.

The video for "(You & Me) As Thick As Thieves" was released in September 2009.

In November 2009, the band released the a second EP featuring songs recorded in between touring of that year. The lead single "Fist Full of Dollars" was Download of the Day on NME.com and Song of the Day on KEXP.org. The second single "You're A Jerk" placed in the NZ Radioscope chart for 9 weeks, peaking at #1. "Fist Full of Dollars", and 3rd single "Dirt in the Water" also placed in the Radioscope charts for 11 and 5 weeks respectively.

In 2010, the band toured the United States and Europe for three months before starting work on their debut album.

While playing at SXSW 2010, the band signed a publishing deal with Native Tongue Music Publishing.

The band was chosen as one of The 25 Best New Bands in the World by MTV in 2010.

In January 2011, the band performed at Big Day Out, an annual music festival held in several cities in Australia and New Zealand.

In 2013, the band released the "Ur The Best" EP, performing their final live show at the Darkroom, Christchurch.

== Discography ==
=== EP I [EP] (2008) ===
No.	Title	Length
1.	"4 TO THE FLOOR"	3:29
2.	"TIME MISMANAGEMENT"	3:15
3.	"(YOU & ME) AS THICK AS THIEVES II"	3:27
4.	"FINGERS IN THE TILL"	4:07

=== EP II [EP] (2009) ===
No.	Title	Length
1.	"BEAT UP THE CHILDREN"	1:54
2.	"FIST FULL OF DOLLARS"	3:52
3.	"YOU'RE A JERK"	4:17
4.	"DIRT IN THE WATER"	2:33

=== UR THE BEST [EP] (2013) ===
No.	Title	Length
1.	"Cough Cough"	2:22
2.	"Boy Scouts"	4:09
3.	"Boys Are Gonna Make You Cry"	3:41
