= End the Silence =

Studio album by Blindspott
- Released: May 29, 2006
- Recorded: 2005–2006
- Genre: Alternative metal, nu metal
- Length: 49:51
- Label: EMI
- Producer: Pelle Henricsson, Eskil Lövström

Blindspott chronology
Blindspott (2003)	End the Silence (2006)

End the Silence is the second album by New Zealand band Blindspott, released in 2006. Citing a desire to avoid sounding similar to rap metal acts from the U.S., and the departure of the former bassist and DJ of the band, Blindspott's second album departs somewhat from the format of their first release. End the Silence has no rapping or scratching, and only small amounts of sampling. Pre-orders for the album were signed by the band members, and came with a free Blindspott wallet. The band were overwhelmed by the number of pre-orders, with Shelton, Blindspott's drummer, reporting on the official site that they had to sign an extra 1,300 albums.

== Change in sound and line-up ==
The band's second album was distinctly different from its predecessor, with a new bassist and guitarist joining the band's line-up and a darker, heavier sound. The band believed the album would speak for itself in years to come and would not detract from the changes the band made in order to achieve the new sound; “This album is just a metal album. It doesn’t really fit into a genre, like the whole ‘emo’ sound that's around now. This will be an album you'll be able to put on years later and it'll still be refreshing and solid.”

== Production ==
The album was produced by Pelle Henrickson and Eskil Lovestrom. The duo had previously worked with Scandinavian acts Cult of Luna, The Refused and Americans Poison the Well. The producers pushed Blindspott to the limits in order to create End the Silence, forcing them into uncomfortable situations, making them interrogate the way they approached writing and recording. The band recalls: “this time we were working with full on international professionals. There were things like diets for Damian, and they had me going for runs and stuff. They just kind of picked the shit out of us, and ripped us and the songs apart. The studio was really quite full on. You’d be drained by the end of each day.” Guitarist Brandon Reihana was positive of the outcome, despite the challenging conditions; “It was just to get the best out of us. They knew how to do it, they were really good at relating to people.” McDermott stated that the change in approach was very beneficial for the group; “It opened our minds a lot. They played us a lot of music we’d never listened to, and showed us we could use these timeless ideas. That was their whole thing - to make this album timeless.”

== Lyrical themes ==
The album is also noted for its heavier emotional tone, in particular lyricist and vocalist Damian Alexander's personal issues at the time of writing and recording. Alexander's lyrics reflect extremely personal themes, from the birth of his child Charlotte, to the wreckage of failed relationships. However, the themes remained positive and hopeful.

== Track listing ==
1. "1975" – 4:10
2. "Drown" – 3:31
3. "Dead Inside" – 3:49
4. "Yours Truly" – 3:29
5. "Lull" – 4:20
6. "For This Love" – 4:39
7. "IV" – 1:53 (Marcus Powell)
8. "Coma" – 4:15
9. "Cave In" – 3:58
10. "Just Know" – 3:57
11. "Face Down" – 2:03
12. "Stay" – 2:50
13. "Away From Me" – 0:54
14. "Pray For Me" – 5:56

=== Collectors edition ===
A Tour Edition CD/DVD of End the Silence was released on 23 July 2007. This Tour Edition is a limited release. The CD–DVD set contains the following:

CD

3 bonus tracks appended to the album

15. "Stay (Remix)"
16. "1975 (Going Blind Remix)"
17. "Stay (1,500 Dollar Remix)"

DVD

A DVD featuring all of the band's videos

1. Nil By Mouth (Original)
2. Nil By Mouth (International)
3. Room To Breathe (Original)
4. Room To Breathe (International)
5. S.U.I.T. (So Us Is This)
6. Lit Up
7. Phlex
8. Blank
9. Yours Truly
10. Drown
11. Stay
12. Lull
