= Dead Sight =

Studio album by Villainy
- Released: 18 September 2015 (NZ); 6 November 2015 (AU)
- Recorded: 2014
- Studio: Studios in the City, Melbourne.
- Genre: Alternative rock, alternative metal
- Length: 49:16
- Producer: Tom Larkin

Villainy chronology
Mode. Set. Clear. (2012)	Dead Sight (2015)

Singles from Dead Sight
- 1. "Safe Passage"; 2. "Give Up the Ghost"; 3. "No Future"; 4. "Nothing Ever Changes"

Dead Sight is the second album by New Zealand alternative rock band Villainy, released in New Zealand 18 September 2015 by Warner Music Group and in Australia on 6 November 2015 by MGM Distribution.

== Track listing ==
No.	Title	Length
1.	"Give Up The Ghost"	4:08
2.	"Safe Passage"	4:29
3.	"Syria"	5.08
4.	"Love and War"	4:45
5.	"Dead Sight"	4:51
6.	"Nothing Ever Changes"	3:33
7.	"Tantalus"	5:27
8.	"The National Guard"	5:38
9.	"No Future"	3:21
10.	"Ginzu Knifing"	3:43
11.	"The Great Unknown"	4:59
Total length:		50:01

== Charts ==
Chart (2015)	Peak position
New Zealand Top 20 New Zealand Albums Chart	1
New Zealand Top 40 Albums Chart	4

== Personnel ==
Adapted from the album's liner notes.

Villainy

- Neill Fraser – guitar, vocals, Organ
- Dave Johnston – drums, percussion
- Thomas Watts – guitar
- James Dylan – bass

Production

- Tom Larkin – producer, mixing ("Syria")
- Samuel K – engineer, mixing (except "Syria)
- Brian Lucey – mastering
- Dave Johnston – additional recording
- Ben Ehrenberg – additional recording
- Jon Grace – additional recording
- Barny Bewick – package design
