= Madeline Anello-Kitzmiller =

American woman

Madeline Anello-Kitzmiller (born 1997) is an American woman noted for her response to being assaulted at Rhythm and Vines in New Zealand on December 31, 2017. Anello-Kitzmiller attracted both praise and criticism for her behavior following being assaulted.

== Background ==
Anello-Kitzmiller, from Portland, was attending Rhythm and Vines on December 31, 2017. She was topless, having paid to have her breasts painted with glitter at a 'glitter tits' stall at the festival. While walking through the venue, a man came up behind her and a friend and groped one of her decorated breasts. The man then retreated to where he was sitting nearby with friends. Enraged, Anello-Kitzmiller and her friend turned and approached the man. Her friend poured a drink on him, and Anello-Kitzmiller hit him four times. Anello-Kitzmiller indicated that she had previously been abused by others at the festival, and her response was partly due to her pent-up anger. After attacking the man, Anello-Kitzmiller kept her breasts exposed until the following morning.

== Praise ==
Some writers, such as Suzannah Weiss, noted that sexual assaults at events like Rhythm and Vines have been too common. Weiss praised Anello-Kitzmiller as a feminist hero for her actions.

== Aftermath ==
On 28 January 2018, a march was held in Auckland to promote requiring consent and to show solidarity with Anello-Kitzmiller. Some of the women in the march went topless wearing glitter similar to how Anello-Kitzmiller was dressed at the original event.
