= Blindspott =

New Zealand band

- Origin: West Auckland, Auckland, New Zealand
- Genres: Alternative metal; nu metal; rap rock
- Years active: 1997–2007, 2018–present
- Labels: EMI; Capitol Records
- Members: Damian Alexander; Marcus Powell; Shelton Woolright
- Past members: Brandon Reihana; Dave McDermott; Karl Vilisini; Gareth Fleming; Tristan Reilly

Blindspott is a New Zealand alternative metal band from West Auckland. After performing under the name Blacklistt for several years, the original line-up got back together in 2018. The band was formed in 1997 with members Damian Alexander (vocals), Marcus Powell (guitar, backing vocals), Shelton Woolright (drums), Gareth Fleming (bass) and Karl Vilisini, also known as DJ Dlay (turntables, keyboards).

== History ==
=== Formation and debut album (1997–2004) ===
Blindspott was formed in 1997 and developed a loyal following in the years leading up to their self-titled album release. Often labelled as a "nu-metal" band, the band has insisted this genre label was a result of the world catching up to their early development, rather than capitalising on a popular sound at the time. Blindspott's first single, "Nil By Mouth", was a success in 2001 and gained major airplay on television and radio channels across the country. Other hits released during 2001-2003 were "Room to Breathe", "Phlex" (which reached No. 2 on the charts), "Blank", "S.U.I.T" and "Lit Up". Blindspott, their self-titled debut album, was released in 2002 and reached number 1, going platinum in New Zealand in its first week of release. The album has since been certified 3× Platinum in New Zealand.

=== End The Silence and line-up change (2005–2007) ===
Blindspott underwent a line-up change for the writing and recording of their second album, End the Silence. Fleming and Vilisini were replaced by Dave McDermott on bass and Brandon Reihana as a second guitarist. McDermott had worked for the band as a technician, while Reihana first toured with the group as substitute bassist when they went to Japan in 2004. The second album digressed significantly from the nu-metal style of their debut album, developing a darker hard-rock sound, without scratching and hip-hop influences.

Their first single from the new album, "Drown", was released on 1 May 2006 and entered the official New Zealand music chart on 7 May 2006, going straight to No. 4. End the Silence was released shortly after in New Zealand on 29 May 2006 and broke New Zealand music records - in the first week of release it went straight to the top of the official New Zealand music charts.

In August 2006, Blindspott played at the Summer Sonic Festival in Tokyo, Japan, alongside major acts such as Metallica, Deftones, Linkin Park and Tool.

End the Silence was released in Australia on 2 September 2006.

=== Break-up and reunion show (2007–2009) ===
In 2007, after 10 years together and many publicised band fallouts, Blindspott broke up. The band played its final concert on 25 August 2007 at the Powerstation nightclub in Auckland. On 27 July 2009 they released a live CD/DVD filmed at the Powerstation concert.

In November 2008, Blindspott announced they were reuniting for a one-off performance at the Vodafone Homegrown Music Festival in Wellington on 14 March 2009 as one of three acts reforming to perform at the festival.

=== Reformation and current events (2010–present) ===
Founding member Marcus Powell released a new track called "Sleep" with his side project - City of Souls in March 2015.

On 15 May 2010, it was announced on Facebook that Blindspott had reunited and were writing new material. The band had also reformed to include its original members. The same day they were confirmed for Homegrown 2011. On 27 September a photo was posted by a band member showing Tristan Reilly as the new drummer for the band.

On 5 March 2011, lead singer Damian Alexander announced they would be releasing their new single "From The Blind Spot" under the name Blacklistt for legal reasons. Currently the band members are in a legal battle with former drummer, Shelton Woolright, to keep releasing music under the name of Blindspott. Entertainment lawyer Mick Sinclair is handling the case for Blindspott. In August 2011, it was revealed that the band would continue under the name Blacklistt instead of giving in to Shelton Woolwright's demands. A video clip for the band's single From the Blind Spot was released in January 2012.

Shelton Woolwright was criticized for his use of blackface in 2015.

On 31 August 2018, the band members, including Shelton Woolwright, announced they would be reforming for a one off show in September as part of the Rock1500 Countdown. The band then later announced that they would embark on a reunion tour in December with support from fellow NZ band Devilskin. On 1 October 2018, it was announced that Blindspott would be performing at Homegrown 2019.

On 14 February 2020, band members Shelton Woolwright and Marcus Powell, announced they had reformed Blindspott and will be touring New Zealand during March and April 2020, with a majority of these dates later postponed to October and November due to the COVID-19 pandemic. The band also performed at Homegrown 2021 the following March.

In 2025 they were awarded the Top Group Award by the Variety Artists Club of New Zealand.

== Discography ==
=== Albums ===
Year	Title	Details	Peak chart positions	Certification
Year	Title	Details	NZ	Certification
2002	Blindspott	Released: 2 September 2002; Label: EMI; Catalogue: 5435292	1	NZ: Platinum x3
2006	End the Silence	Released: 5 June 2006; Label: EMI; Catalogue: 7224082	1	NZ: Platinum
2009	Live at the Powerstation – Sold Out	Released: 17 August 2009; Label: EMI; Catalogue: 2165372	27	
2022	Volume 1	Released: 8 March 2022	—	
"—" denotes a recording that did not chart or was not released in that territory.

=== Singles ===
Year	Title	Peak chart positions		Certification	Album
Year	Title	NZ	NZ Hot	Certification	Album
2001	"Nil by Mouth"	38	—		Blindspott
2002	"Room to Breathe"	32	—		Blindspott
2002	"S.U.I.T"	36	—		Blindspott
2003	"Phlex"	3	—	NZ: Gold	Blindspott
2003	"Blank"	42	—		Blindspott
2004	"Lit Up"	—	—		Blindspott
2005	"Yours Truly"	9	—		End the Silence
2006	"Drown"	4	—		End the Silence
2006	"Stay"	—	—		End the Silence
2006	"Lull" (feat. Anika Moa)	—	—		End the Silence
2009	"Coma"	—	—		End the Silence
2021	"R.I.P. (Rest in Pieces)"	—	11		Volume 1
2022	"Tonight"	—	37		Volume 1
2022	"Pretty Violent"	—	40		Volume 3
2025	"Burn Me Alive"	—	15		Volume 3
2025	"Coming Home"	—	37		Volume 3
2026	"Stitches"	—	11		Non-album single
