= BW Summer Festival =

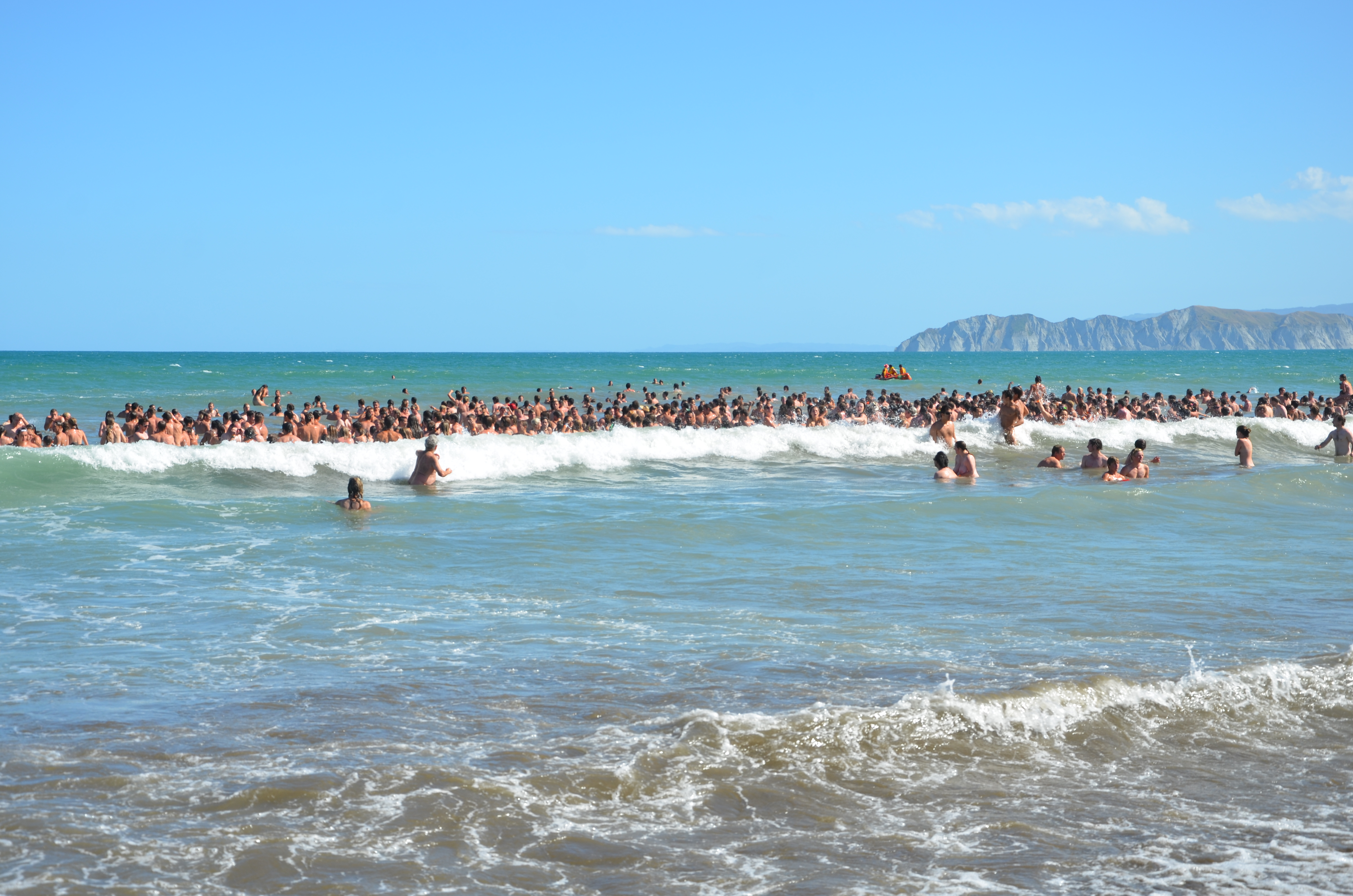
- Dates: 27 December – 1 January
- Locations: Gisborne, New Zealand
- Years active: 2004–2014
- Website: www.bwsummerfestival.com

BW Summer Festival, (commonly known as BW or BayWatch), was an annual music festival that was held in Gisborne, New Zealand.

== History ==
The festival began in 2004 as BW Campgrounds, to help host the thousands of visitors visiting the district for the Rhythm and Vines New Year's Eve festival. BW operates a range of camping grounds hosting over 16,000 people each year.

In 2007, BW Summer Festival added the Jim Beam Sound Shell amphitheatre to host its own artists in the lead-up to Rhythm and Vines.

BW holds the Guinness World Record for the largest skinny dip event

On the evening of 31 December 2014, a riot broke out at the campground between the two sectioned off campsites when some campers decided to set tents on fire and started throwing things at each other. It resulted in 68 arrests and 83 injuries.

Since 2015 this festival has been merged with the Rhythm & Vines festival.

== Line-ups ==
=== 2014/2015 ===
Flume, Shapeshifter, David Dallas, Peking Duk, Sticky Fingers, Home Brew.
