= Blindspott (album) =

Studio album by Blindspott
- Released: 2 September 2002
- Recorded: 2002
- Genre: Nu metal, rap metal
- Length: 59:40
- Label: Blindspott International/EMI
- Producer: Paul Matthews

Blindspott chronology
Blindspott (2002)	End the Silence (2006)

Blindspott is the self-titled debut album by the New Zealand nu metal group. The band licensed its release through EMI New Zealand. The album went platinum in New Zealand in its first week of release. It is now triple-platinum.

== Track listing ==
All tracks are written by Damian Alexander, Marcus Powell, Shelton Woolright, Karl Vilisini and Gareth Flemming, except where noted

No.	Title	Writer(s)	Length
1.	"Mind Dependency"		6:07
2.	"Nil By Mouth"		3:37
3.	"Suffocate"		4:04
4.	"Fall Down"		4:00
5.	"Interlude"	Marcus Powell	1:06
6.	"Blank"		5:27
7.	"S.U.I.T. (So Us Is This)"		3:44
8.	"Jaded"	Shelton Woolright	1:33
9.	"Plastic Shadow"		5:25
10.	"Lit Up"		4:31
11.	"Room to Breathe"		4:01
12.	"PMF"	Marcus Powell	1:27
13.	"Phlex" (Featuring: Kitchener Powell)		4:30
14.	"Ilah (Silent War)"		10:16

2003 limited edition enhanced bonus CD
No.	Title	Writer(s)	Length
1.	"Phlex" (Che Fu Mix 03)
2.	"Phlex" (Dubious Brothers Mix 03)
3.	"Phlex" (DLT Mix 03)
4.	"Phlex" (Live Studio Demo Version)
5.	"Nil By Mouth" (International version)	Music video
6.	"Lit Up" (Music video)
7.	"S.U.I.T" (Music video)
8.	"1000ks Home Video"

== Charts ==
=== Weekly charts ===
Chart (2002–2003)	Peak position
New Zealand Albums (RMNZ)	1

=== Year-end charts ===
Chart (2003)	Position
New Zealand Albums (RMNZ)	13

== Certifications ==
Certifications for Blindspott
Region	Certification	Certified units/sales
New Zealand (RMNZ)	2× Platinum	30,000^{^}
^{^} Shipments figures based on certification alone.
