= We Rise =

Studio album by Devilskin
- Released: 11 July 2014
- Studio: York Street Recording Studios, New Zealand
- Genre: Alternative metal; heavy metal; hard rock
- Length: 48:14
- Label: Devilskin Ltd; Rodeostar (outside of New Zealand)
- Producer: Clint Murphy

Devilskin chronology
We Rise (2014)	Live at the Powerstation (2014)

Singles from We Rise
- 1. "Little Pills" Released: 10 March 2012; 2. "Never See The Light" Released: 1 March 2013; 3. "Start a Revolution" Released: 3 May 2014; 4. "Fade" Released: 9 November 2014

We Rise is the debut studio album by New Zealand metal band Devilskin. It was released in 2014 and debuted at #1 on the New Zealand charts and went platinum in 2015.

== Background ==
The songs on the album were written by the band over a period of several years. Before the recordings, the band spent some time with producer Clint Murphy. Recording for the album took place over three weeks at the York St Studios in Auckland, New Zealand. Further recordings took place at the Rockfield Studios in Monmouth, Wales, where, Queen recorded their album A Night at the Opera.

The first single of the album, Little Pills is about vocalist Jennie Skulander's own experiences. After the end of a love affair, she also lost her job. She moved to New Zealand and took antidepressants. After she started taking these "little pills", she suddenly felt unhappy.

Never See the Light was also written by Skulander and was dedicated to her friend Shoki Kamishima, who died in 2010. Kamishima was able to mimic the sounds of dolphins during his lifetime and was frightened by people in pubs with this art. A recording of this can be heard at the beginning of the song.

Violation, written by Skulander, is about a turn of events that occurred to her, including a burglary that occurred in her apartment. Although the perpetrators were arrested, they were not convicted. Skulander criticized in the song the New Zealand judiciary, which imposed in her opinion inadequate punishments.

== Release ==
In 2012, the bands YouTube page published the first single "Little Pills". The song gained popularity for the band and in 2013, they released "Never See the Light" as their second single, followed by "Start a Revolution" as their third single. In 2014, We Rise was released on CD, Vinyl, and on digital music stores, such as iTunes and Google Play.

The album was released worldwide through German record label Rodeostar.

== Reception ==
We Rise debuted at #1 on the New Zealand music charts and gained very positive reviews.

Marcel Rudoletzky from the German magazine Metal Hammer described the music of Devilskin as "powerful, modern rock and metal mixture", which "does not need to hide behind other sizes". He emphasized the "strong and varied songwriting" of the band and called We Rise a "damn good first work".

The album received platinum certification in 2015, after selling more than 15,000 units in New Zealand. The single "Start a Revolution" reached 28th place in the NZ singles chart, making it the highest-charting single on the album.

== Track listing ==
All tracks are written by Devilskin, except where noted.

No.	Title	Writer(s)	Length
1.	"Elvis Presley Circle Pit"		4:09
2.	"Little Pills"	Paul Martin, Jennie Skulander, Tony Vincent, Richard McWhannell	3:18
3.	"Vessel"		3:28
4.	"Start a Revolution"	P. Martin, Skulander, Vincent, N. Martin, Don Gilmore, Aimee E. Allen	3:24
5.	"Never See the Light"		4:33
6.	"Until You Bleed"	P. Martin, Skulander, Vincent, McWhannell	3:09
7.	"Fade"	P. Martin, Skulander, Vincent, McWhannell	3:41
8.	"Surrender"		3:10
9.	"Burning Tree"		3:46
10.	"The Horror"		1:06
11.	"Violation"		3:18
12.	"Covet"		1:25
13.	"Cherophobia (The Failure In Me)"		4:29
14.	"Dirt"	P. Martin, Skulander, Vincent, McWhannell	5:20
Total length:			48:14

Digital edition
No.	Title	Writer(s)	Length
1.	"Elvis Presley Circle Pit"		4:09
2.	"Little Pills"	Paul Martin, Jennie Skulander, Tony Vincent, Richard McWhannell	3:18
3.	"Chainsaw"		0:08
4.	"Vessel"		3:19
5.	"Start a Revolution"	P. Martin, Skulander, Vincent, N. Martin, Don Gilmore, Aimee E. Allen	3:24
6.	"Never See the Light"		4:33
7.	"Until You Bleed"	P. Martin, Skulander, Vincent, McWhannell	3:09
8.	"Fade"	P. Martin, Skulander, Vincent, McWhannell	3:41
9.	"Surrender"		3:10
10.	"Burning Tree"		3:46
11.	"The Horror"		1:06
12.	"Violation"		3:18
13.	"Covet"		1:25
14.	"Cherophobia (The Failure In Me)"		4:29
15.	"Dirt"	P. Martin, Skulander, Vincent, McWhannell	5:20
Total length:			48:13

== Charts ==
=== Weekly charts ===
Year	Chart	Peak position
2014	Official New Zealand Top 40 Albums	1

=== Certifications ===
Region	Certification	Certified units/sales
New Zealand (RMNZ)	Platinum	15,000^{^}
^{^} Shipments figures based on certification alone.

=== Singles ===
Year	Title	Peak chart positions
Year	Title	NZ
2012	"Little Pills"	—
2013	"Never See The Light"	—
2014	"Start a Revolution"	28
2014	"Fade"	—
