= The Guards Themselves =

Studio album by Minuit
- Released: 2006
- Recorded: 2005–06
- Genre: Breakbeat, electronica
- Length: 46.04
- Label: Tardus Music
- Producer: Minuit

Minuit chronology
The Guns EP (2004)	The Guards Themselves (2006)	I Went to This Party and There Were 88 Guards with Guns (2008)

The Guards Themselves is an album by New Zealand band, Minuit, that was supposed to be released during early 2005. However, during the production of "The Guards Themselves", lead singer Ruth Carr's left vocal cord was paralysed which delayed the production, and therefore, release of this album to 2006. According to specialists it was unsure if Ruth would ever be able to sing again. However Ruth managed to recover fully a year later and the production for "The Guards Themselves" was able to continue.

Lyrically and musically this is a much more sinister affair than their debut. As well as the hard dance of elements that featured on The 88 there is also evidence of a more "rock" influence on "The Guards Themselves" opposed to The 88. According to Paul Dodge, It sounds bigger and fuller and a little bit harder and it has a lot more depth to it. He goes on to compare Minuit to a teenager, saying it's growing older.

The Guards Themselves was mastered by Emily Lazar at her New York City mastering house at the lodge. Emily has worked with artists David Bowie, Jeff Buckley, Sonic Youth and The Prodigy. They managed to get to Emily through Damian Taylor, who is a Pro Tools operator based in London where he works with artists like Björk; an interesting - if inconsequential - link, because Minuit is often compared to Björk.

This album was named after the Latin proverb "Quis Custodiet Ipsos Custodes?" which translates to "Who Will Guard The Guards Themselves?"

The artwork for The Guards Themselves was designed by Minuit member Paul Dodge and friend Aaron McKirdy. It features childlike cartoon creatures with speech bubbles containing one-liners from the songs. In conjunction with the album release, stickers of the creatures were distributed throughout New Zealand. Paul explains the inspiration behind the creatures: "Those little guys came into being 'cos some of the words are pretty heavy; so when you see a little cartoon character saying it, it puts it into another context. But never to trivialise the sentiment, they're still pretty mean little characters who seem to have a history of their own, of being up against it."

== Track listing ==
1. "I'm Sorry Baby"
2. "The Guards Themselves"
3. "Bury You In Brazil"
4. "Suave As Sin"
5. "Fuji"
6. "Lock The Doors, Block The Roads"
7. "Do Me In"
8. "We're All Scared Professor"
9. "Fake!"
10. "A Room Full Of Cute"
11. "Forever"
12. "The Sum Of Us"
