= The Guns EP =

EP by Minuit
- Released: 2004
- Recorded: 2004
- Genre: Breakbeat
- Label: Tardus Music

Minuit chronology
The 88 (2003)	The Guns EP (2004)	The Guards Themselves (2006)

The Guns EP was an EP by Minuit, released after the successful The 88, featuring their highly successful song, "I Hate Guns." It had a video mocking "Are You Being Served?" It was released in 2004.

The Guns EP was only available for a limited run that sold out in the first week. This won them ‘Best Electronic Release’ at the BNet NZ Music AwardsbNet music awards 2005, on top of a nomination for ‘Breakthrough Artist’ at the Vodafone New Zealand Music Awards.

== Track listing ==
1. I Hate Guns
2. The Sum Of Us (Original Mix)
3. This Music Is Good For The Species*
4. Creeps'n'Freaks'n'you (Agent Alvin Mix Of Am.Em.)
5. Species II (Live At Massey Uni 2004)
6. I Hate Guns (Live At Rippon 2004)
- Alternatively known as Species I

== Videos ==
1. Menace Music Video
2. Species II Music Video
3. Except You Music Video
4. The Living Room Documentary
