= Brain Slaves =

Rock band from New Zealand

- Origin: Auckland, New Zealand
- Genres: Neo-psychedelia; Garage rock Pop
- Years active: 2006–2010
- Label: Currently unsigned
- Members: Sasha Frantz (vocals); Elliott Serjeant (guitar, synths, vocals); Jordan Morris (guitar); Rob Champion (drums, vocals); Jack Smylie (synths, vocals)

Brain Slaves were a band from Auckland, New Zealand, formerly called The Coshercot Honeys. They were acclaimed for their unique sound, which combines neo-psychedelia with garage rock, pop hooks, and syncopated grooves.

== History ==
After forming in late 2005 through The Coshercot Honeys performed shows throughout Auckland, and following some personnel changes in 2006 (the addition of second guitar and a new keyboardist, though still without a bass guitar), the band began to gain wider attention with high energy live shows and more experimental song writing. Reviewer Joanna Hunkin compared them with Franz Ferdinand.

In April 2007 the song "We're All Lions" was played on Auckland student radio station 95bfm and other student radio throughout the country. The song rose to #1 on the 95bFM Top Ten chart and was nominated for three bNet awards including "Best Song" and "Best Pop Song". To follow up the single they released an E.P. of the same name distributed by Rhythm Method, which rose to #18 in the Independent New Zealand Charts. They released a video to accompany the single shot by Trophy Wife Productions . In 2008 the band played a number of support slots including The Veils, Matt Costa and a national tour with Collapsing Cities. They also played alongside The Mint Chicks and The Checks at Vodafone Homegrown on the Wellington Waterfront.

The band played at the Rhythm and Vines festival on 30 December 2008 alongside Franz Ferdinand, Late of the Pier, Santogold, and Public Enemy, and played again at the Vodafone Homegrown festival in March 2009.

== Name change ==
On 12 November 2008, New Zealand indie music website Cheese on Toast revealed the band had officially changed their name to Brain Slaves. This was confirmed on the band's myspace page. Brain Slaves explained they had been thinking about a name change for some time. About the same time as this occurred, new material in the form of small song snippets and videos appeared on Myspace and Youtube.

== Breakup ==
On 10 February 2010, the band announced that they had broken up, saying "The five of us have been the tightest crew, but we feel now that it is time to cut loose and experience life as individuals, not as five parts of one personality." The news was broken by a blogger on Isaaclikes.com, although the Brain Slaves asked him to withhold this information. They went on to say "Brainslaves were a band, but always will be five silly f***ers who love music and mayhem." They will release a free download pack with all their songs, the two music videos they made, and other footage.
