= Find Me Before I Die a Lonely Death.com =

2009 album by Minuit

Studio album by Minuit
- Released: 20 July 2009
- Recorded: 2008–09
- Genre: Electronic
- Length: 54 mins
- Label: Tardus Music

Minuit chronology
I Went to This Party and There Were 88 Guards with Guns (2008)	Find Me Before I Die a Lonely Death.com (2009)	Dance Music Will Tear Us Apart (2010)

Find Me Before I Die a Lonely Death.com is the third album from New Zealand electronic band Minuit.

The URL in the album title, findmebeforeidiealonelydeath.com, was a social networking site, created by the band, for inanimate objects and pets.

Three singles have been released from the album, "25 Bucks," "Aotearoa," and "Wayho."

The song, "I'm Still Dancing" was used in an episode of Grey's Anatomy which was aired in the US on 5 February 2010. The song, "Aotearoa" was used in an episode of Bones which was aired in the US on 3 February 2011, as well as in the Syfy adaptation of the show Being Human.

The artwork for the album was created by lead singer, Ruth Carr, from 100s & 1000s in the shape of a world map.

The album received generally positive reviews, with the New Zealand Herald describing it as an "electro-pop album [...] made up of brilliant contrasts."

== Track listing ==
No.	Title	Length
1.	"Wayho"	5:34
2.	"Run Run"	4:01
3.	"25 Bucks"	3:55
4.	"Queen of the Flies"	4:43
5.	"I Hate You"	4:06
6.	"Maserati"	1:35
7.	"Aotearoa"	4:26
8.	"Yeah Yeah"	3:12
9.	"10ft Tall"	5:35
10.	"Vampires"	2:59
11.	"Daddy-O"	3:39
12.	"I'm Still Dancing"	2:53
13.	"Long Live Zero"	6:00
14.	"Everyone from Everywhere"	1:49
