= Minuit (band) =

New Zealand band

- Origin: Nelson, New Zealand
- Genres: Electronic; Breakbeat
- Years active: 1998–2014, 2025-
- Labels: Tardus, Dollhouse (LON)
- Members: Paul Dodge; Ruth Carr; Ryan Beehre
- Website: www.minuit.co.nz

Minuit (pronounced min-wee, French for midnight) were an electronic band from New Zealand, formed in Nelson.

The members of Minuit include lead singer, Ruth Carr, with Paul Dodge (also known as Gimme a C!) and Ryan Beehre (also known as Funk'n'SloCuts) playing machines.

== Early work ==
Minuit began as a guitar band with lead vocalist, Ruth Carr, on drums. Ryan Beehre bought a sampler and turned the band electronic, replacing the need for a drummer and putting Ruth out front as vocalist. The band released four self-released EPs, Sonic Experience (1998), Silver (1999), Luck (2000) and Except You (2002).

== The 88 ==
In 2003 Minuit signed to Tardus music and released their debut album, The 88. Some of the songs had already been released on their earlier EPs. The 88 achieved gold certification in New Zealand.

Minuit first came to prominence in 2002 when their first single "Species II" was used in the intro to the New Zealand TV show Queer Nation.

A video of the single "Except You" was made by their flatmate Alyx Duncan who thought it would be fun. The result was an award-winning eerie carnival-themed music video.

In 2004 the band released a limited edition 7 track EP, The Guns EP, featuring the single "I Hate Guns" (which has an animated video mimicking the TV show Are You Being Served?). The CD also included 3 music videos and a video interview from Sticky Pictures' "The Living Room". The Guns EP was only available for a limited run that sold out in the first week. This won the band 'Best Electronic Release' at the bNet music awards 2005, and a nomination for 'Breakthrough Artist' at the Vodafone New Zealand Music Awards.

== The Guards Themselves ==
Released in 2006 was the album The Guards Themselves. With this album the band turned to Alyx Duncan once again to make a video for their single "Fuji." The album also features singles "Suave as Sin" with a video directed by Mike Bridgman (Nektar Films, Wgtn) featuring a 4 year old Kiel Beehre and, "A Room Full of Cute".

In 2007, their music was included in the PS3 Downloadable version of Sidhe Interactive's GripShift. The songs "Fuji", "A Room Full of Cute", and "This Music is Good for the Species" were all a part of the game's final track listing.

The Minuit live show toured NZ and Europe extensively throughout 2006–2008. While doing so they released a series of remix 12"s. "Fuji", "Except You", and "A Room Full of Cute". The most notable being a remix of 'A Room Full of Cute' by Rico Tubbs.

A European compilation of The 88, The Guns EP, and The Guards Themselves called I Went to This Party and There Were 88 Guards with Guns was released in April 2008 to get their northern hemisphere fanbase 'up-to-speed' on their current discography. The release was through London-based label Doll House Records.

== Find Me Before I Die a Lonely Death.com ==
In March 2009, Minuit released "Wayho" (co-produced by Andy Chatterley), the lead single off their album Find Me Before I Die a Lonely Death.com, which was released in New Zealand on 20 July 2009. The album was released worldwide on 30 October 2009. The album's cover art features a world map created by the band themselves out of pieces of confectionery.

On the single's release, Rolling Stone Australia magazine were quoted as saying: "Despite an album title as dark as midnight, Minuit's music is often as joyful as a fat kid with cake".

"25 Bucks", the album's second single, was released with a video by Brendon Davies-Patrick.

In anticipation of the album's third single, "Aotearoa" (the Māori name for New Zealand), fans were encouraged to send in a photo representing who they each were as New Zealanders. In what some tagged "the largest audience participation video in NZ", photos of over a thousand people were edited together alongside New Zealand historical archive footage to form the video. The aim of the music video was to emphasise the lyric: "You and me, we are a New Zealand", to acknowledge people who have shaped the country, and to encourage people now that it is up to them to make it the place they want it to be.

The song was picked up by TVNZ as the backdrop to their 2009 Waitangi Day coverage, and was subsequently featured as the background theme for their Heartland channel. It was then used in the 2011 Bones episode "The Sin in the Sisterhood".

The album track "I'm Still Dancing" was featured in the Grey's Anatomy episode "State of Love and Trust", which aired in the US on 4 February 2010.

Dodge and Beehre worked on a Minuit remix EP called Dance Music Will Tear Us Apart (released 8 November 2010), while Carr worked on her debut book, I Felt Like a Fight, Alright?, featuring "one-liners, poems, lyrics & tales" (released 21 March 2011).

Various remixes from the band's back catalogue were released as a part of a "summer remixes" season, all of which were compiled into a remix album, Dance Music Will Tear Us Apart, Again, which was released on 24 June 2011.

== Last Night You Saw This Band ==
In early 2012, Minuit collaborated with Gamelan Taniwha Jaya, a Balinese Gamelan from the New Zealand School of Music, under direction of notable New Zealand composer, Gareth Farr. Compositions were arranged by Jason Erskine and the ensemble performed at the music festivals WOMAD and Homegrown.

On 15 December 2011, Minuit had released Book of the Dead, the lead single off their album Last Night You Saw This Band. This album was released worldwide on 21 December 2012, the same day as the Mayan "end of the world". The band used crowdfunding site PledgeMe to fund a vinyl pressing of the album. The project hit its target in under 11 hours and a double 12" vinyl package was created.

Minuit performed the title track at the 2013 Homegrown on the Electronic Stage with the Wellington Balkan Brass Explosion, a gypsy brass band playing piano accordion, percussion, trumpets, trombones and a sousaphone.

Various remixes have surfaced of the album tracks, including the "Ghost EP" with mixes by Funk'n'slocuts, Gene K, Unsub and Levi Niha.

== Reunion ==
On April 9, 2025, the founding members of Minuit announced a three-date reunion tour. These were to be their first shows since their live farewell in 2014.

== Discography ==
Date of Release	Title	Label	Charted	Country	Catalog Number
Albums
2003	The 88	Tardus Music	#21	New Zealand	
2006	The Guards Themselves	Tardus Music	#12	New Zealand	
2008	I Went to This Party and There Were 88 Guards with Guns	Dollhouse Records (LON)		Europe	
2009	Find Me Before I Die a Lonely Death.com	Tardus Music	#8	New Zealand	
2012	Last Night You Saw This Band	Minuit Productions	-	New Zealand	
EPs
1998	Sonic Experience		-	-	
1998	Silver		-	-	
2000	Luck		-	-	
2002	Except You		-	-	
2004	The Guns EP	Tardus Music	-	-	
2010	Dance Music Will Tear Us Apart	Tardus Music	-	-	
Vinyl
2006	Fuji	Tardus Music		New Zealand	TARV001
2007	Except You	Dollhouse Records (LON)		New Zealand	DOLLV001
2007	A Room Full of Cute	Dollhouse Records (LON)		New Zealand	DOLLV002
2012	Last Night You Saw This Band (full album)	Dollhouse Records (LON)		Worldwide	DOLLV003
