= Black River Drive =

New Zealand rock band

- Origin: Auckland, New Zealand
- Genres: Rock
- Years active: 2008–present
- Labels: Unsigned
- Members: Sam Browne; Rusty McNaughton; Matt Stone; Karl Woodhams; Davie Wong
- Website: Official site

Black River Drive is a rock band from Auckland, New Zealand. Black River Drive consists of Sam Browne (lead vocals, guitar), Rusty McNaughton (bass), Matt Stone (piano, synths), Mike Tan (drums) and Davie Wong (lead guitar).

Black River Drive toured New Zealand extensively in 2010 and 2011, before starting to work on their second album, that was released on 7 November 2014.

== History ==
=== Perfect Flaws ===
After signing with record distributor Rhythm Method (Opshop, Fat Freddy’s Drop, Shapeshifter), Black River Drive’s debut album Perfect Flaws was released on 4 October 2010. Greg Haver and Chris Van De Geer produced the album. Many tracks were mixed by Tim Palmer at '62 Studios in Austin, Texas.

==== Special edition ====
On 3 March 2011, Black River Drive published a special edition release of the Perfect Flaws album. On the final day of recording Perfect Flaws, the band recorded some songs in a relaxed, live acoustic setting. Initially the band gifted some tracks to Facebook fans as MP3s and made all five songs available in full CD quality as a limited release.

=== Quicksand ===
Black River Drive's album Quicksand was produced by Toby Wright in Nashville, had additional guitars tracked by Zorran Mendonsa in Auckland, mixing by Forrester Savell in Melbourne, and mastering by Jens Borgen at Fascination Street in Sweden.

The album was recorded over two months in Nashville, Tennessee with US hard rock and metal producer Toby Wright, the man behind albums by the likes of Alice in Chains, Metallica, Slayer, Sevendust and Ozzy Osbourne. It was funded through a $20k crowdfunding campaign and received government funding from NZOA. The album was mixed by Australian rock producer and engineer Forrester Savell (I Am Giant, Karnivool, Dead Letter Circus) and mastered at Fascination Street in Sweden.

Their new album is scheduled for release on 7 November 2014.

== Discography ==
=== Albums ===
Year	Title	Details	Peak chart positions
Year	Title	Details	NZ
2010	Perfect Flaws	Label: Black River Records; Catalogue: B00NN1CNQW	17
2014	Quicksand	Released: 7 November 2014; Label: Black River Records; Catalogue: B00Q7TC3XA	—
"—" denotes a recording that did not chart or was not released in that territory.
