= Blacklistt =

New Zealand rock band

- Origin: West Auckland, New Zealand
- Genres: Alternative metal; alternative rock; nu metal; metalcore
- Years active: 2010–present
- Members: Damian Alexander; Marcus Powell; Karl Vilisini; Gareth Fleming
- Past members: Tristan Reilly

Blacklistt is a New Zealand rock band formed by four of the original members of the New Zealand-based group Blindspott, Damian Alexander (vocals), Marcus Powell (guitar, backing vocals), Gareth Fleming (bass) and Karl Vilisini (turntables, keyboards, Production).

== History ==
In 2010, four original members of the band Blindspott reformed the group with new drummer Tristan Reilly and appeared at the 2011 Homegrown Music Festival, but the band subsequently entered a legal battle with former drummer Shelton Woolright over the use of the name. Eventually, the band opted to tour and release music under the name Blacklistt. The band performed tracks from the two Blindspott albums, as well as debuting single “From the Blind Spot" which had been receiving generous airplay at the time at the Homegrown festival. Alexander described the long legal battle as unfortunate, saying, "...it sucks actually. We're doing this for the love of the music and for our fans. I've had fans stop me in the street and ask when we'll start making music again." In the meantime, fans could download the group's single "From the Blind Spot" for free through a Vodafone promotion. The band eventually reached a stalemate with the legal process and decided to continue as Blacklistt.

In late 2011 the band was announced as a headliner for the 2012 Homegrown festival, alongside other big-name New Zealand artists Shihad, P-Money and the Feelers. Blacklistt won the award for 'Best Rock Album' at The Vodafone New Zealand Music Awards in 2014.

== Releases ==
Prior to the 18 February performance at Homegrown, the band premiered their music video for From the Blind Spot online and on music video channels. The song was released on iTunes on 22 February as part of the Songs For the South charity compilation album. On 1 May 2012, the band's second single, Worth Fighting For was released. The band went on their first national tour in May and June 2012. The band then played the Waihi Beach Summer Festival on 22 December. On 9 April 2013, the band released a new single and video. Titled Burn, the track debuted on the NZ singles chart in the number 7 position. The band released a new single titled Home on 9 August, which debuted at number 13 on the NZ singles chart. The band will release their debut, self-titled album on 13 September. The band will embark on a national tour of New Zealand in September/October to promote the release. Tristan Rielly stepped down from permanent drum duties in the band in 2013, however he remains with the group as a touring/session member and appears on all tracks on the album bar Home (for which Albert Cook of Three Houses Down performed).

== Members ==
- Damian Alexander – vocals (2010–present)
- Marcus Powell – guitar and vocals (2010–present)
- Gareth Fleming – bass guitar, vocals (2010–present)
- Karl Vilisini – keyboard, turntables, vocals (2010–present)

Previous

- Tristan Reilly – drums (2010-2013; remains a touring member of the band)

== Discography ==
=== Albums ===
Year	Title	Details	Peak chart positions
Year	Title	Details	NZ
2013	Blacklistt	Released: 13 September 2013; Label: Blindspott Ltd; Catalogue: BL001	1
"—" denotes a recording that did not chart or was not released in that territory.

=== Singles ===
Year	Title	Peak chart positions		Album
Year	Title	NZ	NZ singles	Album
2012	"From the Blind Spot"	—	—	Blacklistt
2012	"Worth Fighting For"	—	—	Blacklistt
2013	"Burn"	—	7	Blacklistt
2013	"Home"	—	11	Blacklistt
