= The 88 (album) =

Studio album by Minuit
- Released: 2003
- Recorded: 2003
- Genre: Electronic, Breakbeat
- Length: 61.00
- Label: Tardus Music

Minuit chronology
Except You (2002)	The 88 (2003)	The Guns EP (2004)

The 88 is the debut album from the New Zealand band Minuit. The album achieved gold certification in New Zealand.

== Track listing ==
1. "The Boy with the Aubergine Hair"
2. "Claire"
3. "Menace"
4. "Species II"
5. "Except You"
6. "Queen 88"
7. "Djordj"
8. "Milk"
9. "a.m. e.m."
10. "Body-Shaped Box"
11. "Nymphs"
12. "Soviet Air Hostess"
13. "Aires"
14. "Jumble"

== Chart performance ==
Chart (2003)	Peak position
New Zealand Albums (RMNZ)	21
