= The Rock (radio station) =

New Zealand radio station

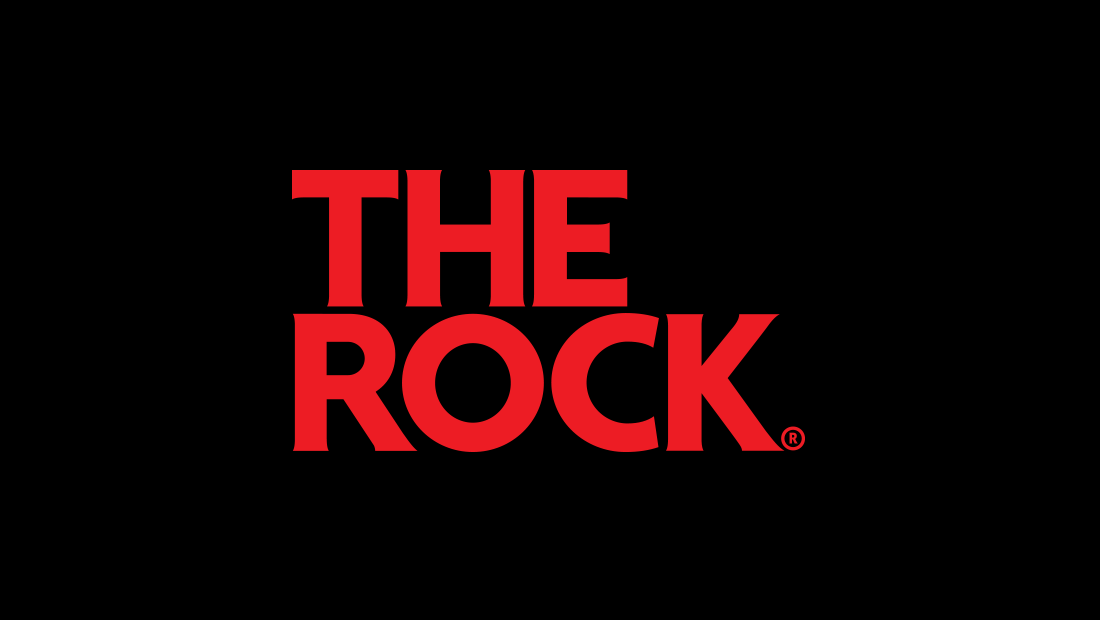
- New Zealand

Programming
- Format: Mainstream rock

Ownership
- Owner: MediaWorks New Zealand

History
- First air date: 1 December 1991

Links
- Webcast: Live stream
- Website: Official website

The Rock is a New Zealand mainstream rock music radio station. The station targets 25–44 with a male skew, but has a significant female fan base. It plays rock music and showcases up-and-coming New Zealand bands.

The Rock has unpredictable features and countdowns, most notably The Rock 2000 (formerly The Rock 1500, 1000 & 500), an annual music countdown based entirely on songs voted for by their rock listeners.

Some of its broadcasts have been controversial, and the Broadcasting Standards Authority has upheld many complaints against it.

== History ==
The Rock began broadcasting on 1 December 1991 in Hamilton as The Rock 93FM. The first song to air on The Rock was Are You Ready? by AC/DC. The Rock was formed by Joe Dennehy GM, Grant Hislop PD, and Martin Dempster.The original line-up included Chris Clarke on breakfast (replaced by Mark Bunting after 2 months) and Roger Farrelly on Drive. Originally, The Rock 93FM was based in the basement of Radio New Zealand Broadcasting House in Hamilton, headquartered in the studios for ZHFM. The transmitter was originally located on the top of Waikato Hospital. In 1993 The Rock moved to new premises at 564 Victoria Street in Hamilton.

The station purchased a collection of FM frequencies from the Christian Broadcasting Association and transferred them to Nevada. Using the first of these frequencies a local version of The Rock was started in Taranaki in 1993, this station was originally broadcast on 100FM but after Nevada Resources Ltd and Energy Enterprises merged, the station moved to 95.6FM. A third The Rock station was started in the Bay of Plenty in 1996 with local programming. In 1997 The Rock created a regional network by replacing the Taranaki and Bay of Plenty stations with the Hamilton-based The Rock station and also networked into Rotorua.

=== Nationwide expansion ===
In 1998 The Rock began networking to other regions in the North Island. In 1999, The Rock moved to Auckland, and began broadcasting from there. Later that year, Energy Enterprises and Radio Otago merged to form RadioWorks; as a result, the station was networked into the South Island. In Christchurch, Radio Otago had already been operating their own rock station called C93FM and this station was networked to Dunedin and Invercargill, C93FM actually played a classic rock format similar to Radio Hauraki. RadioWorks replaced C93FM in Dunedin and Invercargill with The Rock and kept C93FM operating in Christchurch, but changed its format to Adult Contemporary and launched The Rock on a separate frequency. C93 no longer operates as the station failed to attract listeners after the format change. Christchurch C93FM listeners were gutted that their local Classic Rock station had a format change and had to give way to a Network station, the phones rung for weeks with upset listeners not liking the format change to Adult Contemporary. Today The Rock broadcasts in almost every market in New Zealand.

The only remaining original member of The Rock crew is Rog. Other DJs left, including Greenman, who went on his OE to the UK, Beachy (Christopher Beach) who moved into sales and Julie Moffett, who now works at RNZ.

== Programmes ==
=== The Morning Rumble ===
The morning radio show is known as The Morning Rumble, the members of which are currently Roger Farrelly ("Rog", "Big Dog"), Bryce Casey (2020 Broadcaster of the Year), Andrew Mulligan ("Mulls") and Mel Abbot. Rog has been a co-host on the show since its inception. Simon Doull spent several years as a co-host, left and returned in 2015. In March 2011 Andrew Mulligan joined but left for Radio Sport a few years later and returned in 2017.

Bryce has attempted to break two world records during his tenure on the show, his most notable attempt being to break the record for "The Longest Tenpin Bowling Marathon". He fell short in 2004 by only a few hours. In June 2019 Bryce not only broke the world record for the longest time ten-pin bowling continuously, he also raised over $350,000 for the charity "I am hope".

==== Hosts ====
Roger, or Rog as he's known, joined the Morning Rumble in 1994. Prior to that he had worked the afternoon shift at The Rock. Rog serves as a leader of sorts for the Morning Rumble crew, and his ongoing banter and power struggles with Bryce provide a lot of the show's entertainment. Mel provides the female perspective on the show and reads the news, while Andrew Mulligan reads the sports news. The producers are Ryan Maguire and Mitch Farr.

==== Features ====
On Fridays a section of the show was called 'Do Stuff To Jono Fridays'. This formed a large part of the entertainment value and was an early distinguishing feature of The Rock. Jono was made the victim of stunts such as 'The Human Slushy', 'The Pyramid of Fire', 'Human Coleslaw', 'Sleigh of Fire', 'The Skater Ramp of Doom', a full body wax, and giving Jono a tattoo on his bottom but not telling him that it was a love heart with the other DJs names.

In 2006 when Jono got his own slot with Robert on weekday afternoons, the show then became "Do Stuff To Jimmy". Stunts included putting electrodes on his nipples, and other assorted painful and humiliating acts. Jimmy is no longer working at The Rock, and there is currently no 'Do Stuff' segment. A one-off 'Final Ever Do Stuff To Jono' stunt was planned and executed in September 2009, during which Jono performed a 'Mega Stunt' - riding a BMX bike down a steep slope, through pyrotechnics and a pane of glass, and finally scaling a ramp to jump over a parked ute.

The Rock organised a 'win a wife' competition in early 2011. The winner would travel to Ukraine to meet a girl via the "Endless Love" dating agency. In response the Ukrainian group Femen organised a topless protest against this competition (in March 2011). A Femen activist advised: "Femen warns the 'lucky' winner of the New Zealand competition that he can expect an unhappy ending in Ukraine".

=== Rock Workdays ===
Mel Abbot takes over on-air from 10am – 12pm fronting The Rock Workdays show which also features a legends of rock hour between 12-1pm. Mel is followed by Lee Weir ("Westie Lee"), who is also the technical producer of The Rock's drive show, from 12pm – 3pm.

=== Rock Drive ===
The Rock's drive show is hosted from 3pm – 7pm by Duncan Heyde ("Dunc"), with co-host Jay Reeve, technical producer Lee Weir ("Westie Lee") and executive producer Tiegan Lilley ("Show Boss").

=== Rock Nights ===
Jack Honeybone (Assistant Content Director) hosted Rock Nights from 2017 until 2025.

=== The Rock 2000 ===
The Rock 2000 is an annual countdown feature, counting down the 2000 biggest rock songs ever, as voted by listeners in an online poll. The chart order, including which bands and songs feature on the countdown, is determined by listeners via a voting system on the station's official website. The countdown runs on weekdays over a four-week period and is broadcast throughout New Zealand.

Previous it was known as The Rock 500 since 1999. Since before 2006 it has been called The Rock 1000. From 2017 to 2019 it was known as The Rock 1500. In 2016, the list expanded by 50% as The Rock 1000+500. Since 2020 it has been known as The Rock 2000. In 2024 they celebrated the 25th anniversary with a live event in Auckland for the top 20 songs on 13 September. In 2025, the live event returned on 26 September with the top 20 songs and headlined by kiwi band Blindspott with a 30 piece philharmonic orchestra. This year's countdown featured 44 tracks from Black Sabbath and lead vocalist Ozzy Osbourne who had died earlier that year shortly after the Back to the Beginning concert in Birmingham.

==== Winners ====
- 2026 – Blindspott - "Nil By Mouth"
- 2025 – Black Sabbath - "War Pigs"
- 2024 – Foo Fighters - "Everlong"
- 2023 – Metallica - "Master of Puppets"
- 2022 – Lynyrd Skynyrd - "Simple Man"
- 2021 – Rage Against the Machine - "Killing in the Name"
- 2020 – Foo Fighters - "Everlong"
- 2019 – Pearl Jam - "Black"
- 2018 – System of a Down - "Chop Suey"
- 2017 – Rage Against the Machine - "Killing in the Name"
- 2016 – Metallica - "Master of Puppets"
- 2015 – AC/DC - "Thunderstruck"
- 2014 – Tool - "Stinkfist"
- 2013 – Tool - "Sober"
- 2012 – Metallica - "One"
- 2011 – Metallica - "One"
- 2010 – Rage Against the Machine - "Killing in the Name"
- 2009 – Metallica - "One"
- 2008 – Metallica - "Enter Sandman"
- 2007 – AC/DC - "Back in Black"
- 2006 – Guns N' Roses - "November Rain"
- 2005 – Metallica - "Enter Sandman"
- 2004 – Metallica - "Enter Sandman"
- 2003 – Pearl Jam - "Daughter"
- 2002 – Metallica - "One"
- 2001 – Nirvana - "Smells Like Teen Spirit"
- 2000 – Metallica - "Enter Sandman"
- 1999 – Metallica - "Enter Sandman"

==== Multiple Time Winners ====
- Metallica - "Enter Sandman" - 5 (1999–2000, 2004–2005, 2008)
- Metallica - "One" - 4 (2002, 2009, 2011–2012)
- Rage Against the Machine - "Killing in the Name" - 3 (2010, 2017, 2021)
- Metallica - "Master of Puppets" - 2 (2016, 2023)
- Foo Fighters - "Everlong" - 2 (2020, 2024)

==== Bands With Winning Songs ====
- Metallica - 11 wins (1999–2000, 2002, 2004–2005, 2008–2009, 2011–2012, 2016, 2023)
- Rage Against the Machine - 3 wins (2010, 2017, 2021)
- Pearl Jam - 2 wins (2003, 2019)
- AC/DC - 2 wins (2007, 2015)
- Tool - 2 wins (2013–2014)
- Foo Fighters - 2 wins (2020, 2024)
- Nirvana - 1 win (2001)
- Guns N' Roses - 1 win (2006)
- System of a Down - 1 win (2018)
- Lynyrd Skynyrd - 1 win (2022)
- Black Sabbath - 1 win (2025)
- Blindspott - 1 win (2026)

== Frequencies ==
Market	Location	MHz
Northland	Whangārei	90.0
Auckland	Rodney	100.1
Auckland	Auckland	90.2
Coromandel	Mercury Bay	105.5
Coromandel	Thames	93.2
Bay of Plenty	Tauranga	94.2
Waikato	Hamilton	93.0
Rotorua	Rotorua	92.7
Rotorua	Reporoa	98.0
Taupō	Taupō	94.4
Gisborne	Gisborne	94.1
Hawke's Bay	Wairoa	94.1
Hawke's Bay	Hastings	95.1
Taranaki	New Plymouth	95.6
Whanganui	Whanganui	95.2
Manawatu	Palmerston North	95.4
Wairarapa	Masterton	95.1
Kapiti	Paraparaumu	91.9
Wellington	Wellington	96.5
Nelson	Nelson	94.4
Marlborough	Picton	92.3
Marlborough	Blenheim	91.3
Canterbury	Kaikōura	89.1
Canterbury	Christchurch	93.7
Ashburton	Ashburton	97.3
South Canterbury	Timaru	91.5
South Canterbury	Mackenzie Country	91.0
North Otago	Oamaru	104.8
Central Otago	Alexandra	98.3
Queenstown	Wānaka	89.8
Queenstown	Queenstown	100.0
Dunedin	Dunedin	93.4
Southland	Invercargill	90.8

== Ratings ==
As of May 2025, The Rock has the third-highest share of the New Zealand commercial radio market at 8.0%, behind Newstalk ZB and The Breeze.

The Rock commercial radio ratings (May 2025)
Market	Station share	Change	Rank
All markets	8.0	▼ −0.9	3
Auckland	4.6	▼ −0.1	7
Christchurch	9.4	▼ −0.3	4
Wellington	8.3	▼ −0.7	3
Waikato	11.9	▼ −2.3	2
Tauranga	7.3	▼ −1.3	6
Manawatū	7.7	▲ +0.1	6
Hawke's Bay	10.0	▼ −1	4
Northland	8.3	▼ −0.6	4
Dunedin	7.8	▲ +1.2	4
Taranaki	5.6	▼ −3.2	2
Nelson	8.4	▼ −1.7	4
Southland	17.6	▼ −0.3	1
Rotorua	8.9	▼ −1.6	5

== Controversies ==
=== Broadcasting standards breaches ===
In November 1999, the Broadcasting Standards Authority upheld a complaint against The Rock relating to multiple broadcasts aired in June of that year. During evening segments, a host had used offensive language, called a female caller a “dozy bitch,” and referred to a well-known All Black as a “faggot.” The BSA found that these broadcasts breached standards of good taste and decency and that the broadcaster failed to maintain recordings as required. The Authority criticised The Rock's defence that its “politically incorrect” style was justified by its target demographic of 18–39-year-old males. It ordered the station to broadcast a statement summarising the decision and pay $1,000 in costs to the Crown.

Also in November 1999, The Rock was found by the BSA to have breached broadcasting standards after airing a racially and religiously offensive joke during the morning broadcast on 14 July 1999. The joke depicted a fictional Indian superette owner and his Pakistani worker in a derogatory scenario involving defecation and urination, with names that gave the exchange an explicitly Muslim slant. The BSA ruled that the joke breached standards of good taste and decency and encouraged denigration on the basis of race and religion. The Rock was ordered to broadcast a summary of the decision and pay $500 in costs to the Crown.

In February 2000, the Broadcasting Standards Authority (BSA) upheld a complaint against The Rock after a host said on air, “stick my hard dick up your butt,” during a live segment with a female caller at around 10:20pm on 20 July 1999. The Rape Prevention Group complained that the remark was sexually explicit, aggressive, and degrading to women. The BSA found the comment offensive and in breach of good taste and decency standards, and ordered The Rock to pay $500 in costs to the Crown. A second complaint about a separate comment was not upheld.

In March 2002, the BSA upheld a complaint against The Rock after its Morning Rumble show broadcast a competition segment titled "The worst things that have ever happened to you when you’ve been drinking". One story, read aloud by the hosts between 7.15 and 8.15am on 31 July 2001, described a drunk youth being stripped, drawn on, urinated on, penetrated with a crutch, and photographed. The BSA found the broadcast offensive and socially irresponsible, particularly given the time of day when children were likely listening. It upheld breaches of good taste and decency and social responsibility standards, ordering $2,500 in costs to be paid to the Crown.

In May 2007, the BSA upheld a complaint against The Rock after announcers aired a stunt where fireworks were fired at a co-host during a morning segment called Do Stuff to Jimmy. Broadcast on 20 October 2006, the segment featured sounds of fireworks, laughter, and the announcers joking that “Jimmy was on fire.” The BSA found the broadcast socially irresponsible, particularly due to its timing during hours when children could be listening, and said the hosts had trivialised the dangers of misusing fireworks. The Authority ordered the broadcast of a statement summarising the decision and required it to be displayed alongside the video on The Rock's website.

In August 2016, the BSA upheld a complaint about a stunt on The Rock Morning Rumble on 16 December 2015 involving Prime Minister John Key. During the segment, Key was invited to enter a cage in the studio and “pick up the soap.” A host then quoted a recognised rape scene from the film Deliverance, saying, “You’ve got a pretty little mouth, Prime Minister.” The BSA found the stunt trivialised sexual violence—specifically prison rape—and crossed the line of legitimate humour, despite being presented as satire. The segment was found to be offensive and socially irresponsible. While the complaint under the law and order standard was not upheld, the BSA ruled the segment breached standards of good taste and decency and responsible programming. The Rock was ordered to issue an on-air statement and to pay $1,000 in costs to the Crown.

In October 2017, the BSA upheld a complaint about two segments on Thane & Dunc on 31 May and 1 June 2017, during which a man was interviewed about a past relationship with a couple. Although pseudonyms were used, the couple was identifiable, and the second interview included allegations of abuse and direct confrontation with the interviewee. The BSA found that the broadcasts seriously breached the privacy of both individuals involved, showing little regard for their dignity, safety, or mental wellbeing. The BSA ordered The Rock to pay $6,000 in compensation to the couple ($3,000 each) and to pay $2,500 in costs to the Crown.

In October 2020, the BSA upheld a complaint that MediaWorks’ response to a breach of the alcohol standard was insufficient. The complaint concerned a Morning Rumble segment on 16 April 2020 that focused on an interviewee's ability to consume alcohol rapidly, which the Authority found amounted to socially irresponsible promotion of alcohol. Although MediaWorks apologised to the complainant and issued internal communications about the alcohol standard, the BSA determined this was inadequate to address the harm caused, and ordered The Rock to issue an on-air statement and to pay $1,000 in costs to the Crown.
