= Luger Boa =

New Zealand rock band

- Origin: Auckland, New Zealand
- Genres: Rock / glam / pop
- Years active: 2008–December 2014
- Labels: Stuka Records
- Members: Jimmy Christmas - Vocals; Johnny Lyon - Guitar; Sam Lockley - Guitar; Simon Nicholls - Bass; Joe Mac - Drums

Luger Boa is a New Zealand rock band led by Jimmy Christmas, formerly of The D4. Christmas formed Luger Boa after The D4 decided to take an indefinite break. Christmas describes the band as "pop-oriented", but with the "intensity of The D4". Their album Mutate or Die was released in 2009 and catapulted them into the public view, largely due to Christmas's fame from The D4.

They have toured extensively in New Zealand, played at many festivals and opened for Kings of Leon in 2009. They opened for Meat Loaf in October 2011. They won Best Local Rock Song in the 2009 Rock Awards for their single "On My Mind".

Their album, "New Hot Nights" was released in New Zealand and Australia on 2 May 2011.
