= 2015 in New Zealand television =

This is a list of New Zealand television events and premieres that occurred in 2015, the 56th year of continuous operation of television in New Zealand.

== Events ==
- 22 February – An episode of The X Factor causes controversy after featuring a man convicted of manslaughter auditioning for the programme and reaching the Boot Camp stage.
- 1 March – TV3 series The X Factor apologises after broadcasting an episode featuring convicted killer Shae Brider, who auditioned for the show, thus causing distress to the family of his victim.
- 16 March – X Factor judges Natalia Kills and husband Willy Moon are fired from the series by TV3 for launching into a tirade against contestant Joe Irvine on the previous day's show.
- 19 March – Natalia Kills and Willy Moon apologise for the X Factor tirade. I am Giant drummer Shelton Woolright and Australian singer Natalie Bassingthwaighte will replace the couple.
- 12 April – TV3 announces that its Sunday evening news bulletin will be shortened to 30 minutes from 24 May.
- 18 May - Beau Monga wins the second series of The X Factor.
- 21 May - TV3 announces (on Budget day) that the Campbell Live current affairs programme is to be axed, and replaced by a Monday to Thursday current affairs programme to follow the news.
- 8 June – Launch of Newsworthy, TV3's new late night weekday news programme, which is presented by Sam Hayes and David Farrier.
- 19 July - Stars in Their Eyes host Simon Barnett and his partner Vanessa Cole win the sixth series of Dancing with the Stars.

== Premieres ==
=== Domestic series ===
Domestic television series premieres on New Zealand television in 2015
Program	Original airdate	Network	Ref
Westside	31 May	TV3	

=== International series ===
International television series premieres on New Zealand television in 2015
Program	Original airdate	Network	Country of origin	Ref
In the Club	7 March	TV One	United Kingdom	
Judge Rinder	2 February	TV2	United Kingdom	
Thunderbirds Are Go	12 April	TV2	United Kingdom, New Zealand	
Humans	11 August	TV3	United Kingdom, United States	
The X Factor	16 September	TV3	United Kingdom	
Battle Creek	22 September	TV One	United States	
Heroes Reborn	28 September	TV3	United States	
The Player	29 September	TV One	United States	
The Muppets	1 November	TV2	United States	
Supergirl	1 November	TV2	United States	
The Octonauts	TBA	TV2	United Kingdom, Ireland	

=== Telemovies and miniseries ===
Domestic television telemovie and miniseries premieres on New Zealand television in 2015
Program	Original airdate	Network	Ref

=== Documentaries ===
Domestic television documentary premieres on New Zealand television in 2015
Program	Original airdate(s)	Network	Ref

=== Specials ===
Domestic television special premieres on New Zealand television in 2015
Program	Original airdate(s)	Network(s)	Ref

== Programming changes ==
=== Programmes changing networks ===
Criterion for inclusion in the following list is that New Zealand premiere episodes will air in New Zealand for the first time on the new network. This includes when a program is moved from a free-to-air network's primary channel to a digital multi-channel, as well as when a program moves between subscription television channels – provided the preceding criterion is met. Ended television series which change networks for repeat broadcasts are not included in the list.

Domestic television series which changed network affiliation in 2015
Programme	Date	New network	Previous network	Ref

International television programmes which changed channel/network in 2015
Programme	Date	New network	Previous network	Country of origin	Ref

=== Free-to-air premieres ===
This is a list of programmes which made their premiere on New Zealand free-to-air television that had previously premiered on New Zealand subscription television. Programs may still air on the original subscription television network.

Programme	Date	Free-to-air network	Subscription network(s)	Country of origin	Ref

=== Subscription premieres ===
This is a list of programmes which made their premiere on New Zealand subscription television that had previously premiered on New Zealand free-to-air television. Programmes may still air on the original free-to-air television network.

International television series that premiered on New Zealand free-to-air television in 2015
Programme	Date	Free-to-air network	Subscription network(s)	Country of origin	Ref

=== Programmes returning in 2015 ===
Returning programmes on New Zealand television in 2015
Programme	Return date	Network	Original run	Ref

=== Milestone episodes in 2015 ===
Domestic television series which have reached a milestone in 2015
Show	Network	Episode #	Episode title	Episode air date	Source

=== Programmes ending in 2015 ===
Domestic programmes ending on New Zealand television in 2011
Programme	End date	Network	Start date	Ref
Campbell Live	29 May	TV3	2005	

== Deaths ==
Date	Name	Age	Notability	Source
9 January	Bernard Buck	88	news reporter	
11 January	Chic Littlewood	84	children's show presenter	
18 February	Doug Armstrong	83	sports broadcaster	
5 April	Steve Rickard	85	pro-wrestler, sports presenter	
