= Mae Valley =

Mae Valley may refer to:

- Maè Valley, valley of the Maè River near Longarone, Italy
- Mae Valley Rd, Interstate 90 in Washington
- Mae Valley (band)
- Mae Valley (EP)
