= The Xtra Factor =

The Xtra Factor may refer to:

- The Xtra Factor (UK TV series), British television programme
- The Xtra Factor (New Zealand TV series), New Zealand television programme
- The Xtra Factor (Australian TV series), Australian television programme
