= Beau Monga =

New Zealand singer and beatboxer

- Birth name: Beau Monga
- Born: 14 April 1994 (age 30); Manurewa, New Zealand
- Genres: Hip hop, pop
- Occupation(s): Singer, songwriter, beatboxer, DJ
- Instrument(s): Vocals, guitar, beatbox, loop pedal
- Years active: 2015–present

Beau Monga (born 14 April 1994) is a New Zealand singer/beatboxer from Manurewa, who won the second season of the New Zealand version of The X Factor.

== Early life ==
Monga was born in South Auckland in 1994. He is the son of Betty-Anne and Ryan Monga of the group Ardijah.

== Musical influence ==
Monga cites his parents, James Brown and Michael Jackson as his main musical influences.

== The X Factor ==
At his audition, Monga performed a version of "Hit the Road Jack" using a loop pedal. He received a standing ovation from all four judges and positive comments. As of 2022, his audition has received over 85 million combined views on Facebook and YouTube after going viral online. After the elimination of Nofo Lameko on week 2 and Stevie Tonks in week 9, Beau was the final act on the boys category who progressed through to the grand final. Going into the grand final, Beau was also the only act in series 2 who never landed in the bottom two. He eventually won the series after beating Nyssa Collins and Brendon Thomas and The Vibes in the grand final. He was initially mentored by Natalia Kills, but he was replaced by former Australian judge Natalie Bassingthwaighte after Kills was removed from the show due to a bullying controversy in the first live show. He is the first (and, to date, only) male winner of The X Factor NZ.

== Discography ==
=== Digital releases from The X Factor ===
Title	Peak positions
Title	NZ Artists
"Jamming"	55
"Happy"	87
"Señorita"	–
"Freestyler"	–
"I Knew You Were Trouble"	69
"Gold Digger"	20
"Goody Goody"	48
"Fade Away"	75
"My Love"/"La La La"	–
"Silly Love Songs"	47
"Insane in the Brain"	56
"Ruketekete Te Mamae"	7
"Hit the Road Jack"	34
"-" denotes a single that did not chart.

=== Singles ===
Year	Title	Peak position	Certifications	Sales
Year	Title	NZ	Certifications	Sales
2015	"King and Queen"	2	RMNZ: Gold	7,500^
"-" denotes a single that did not chart.

=== Albums ===
Year	Title	Peak positions	Certifications
Year	Title	NZ	Certifications
2015	Beau Monga	2	
