= The Horrifying Truth =

Studio album by I Am Giant
- Released: 1 August 2011
- Recorded: January–April 2011
- Studios: Sony Music studios, Sydney; Sing Sing Studios, Melbourne
- Genres: Rock, post-grunge
- Label: Giant Sound/Sony Music
- Producers: Forrester Savell; Paul Matthews (co-producer); Shelton Woolright (co-producer)

I Am Giant chronology
I Am Giant (EP) (2010)	The Horrifying Truth (2011)	Science & Survival (2014)

Singles from The Horrifying Truth
- 1. "And We'll Defy" Released: 10 June 2011; 2. "Let It Go" Released: 2011; 3. "Purple Heart" Released: 2012

The Horrifying Truth is the debut studio album by New Zealand rock band I Am Giant, released on 1 August 2011. It debuted at No. 2 and has been certified Gold in New Zealand. The album became the highest selling NZ rock album of 2011.

With the increasing interest in the band in Asia and Europe, the album was also released in Asia on 23 March 2012, and in the UK on 8 October 2012.

== Production ==
The Horrifying Truth was recorded from January to April 2011 with acclaimed Australian alternative rock producer/engineer Forrester Savell. The album was recorded in Sony Studios in Sydney and Forrester's studio at Sing Sing Studios in Melbourne. I Am Giant bassist Paul Matthews and drummer Shelton Woolright became the album's co-producers.

== Promotion ==
Three singles have been released from the album. "And We'll Defy" was released on 10 June 2011, with the accompanying music video released onto YouTube on 15 July 2011. Music video for "Let It Go" was released onto YouTube on 2 December 2011, and for "Purple Heart" – on 27 April 2012.

== Track listing ==
No.	Title	Length
1.	"Purple Heart"	3:56
2.	"City Limits"	4:03
3.	"Let It Go"	4:42
4.	"The Escape Artist"	3:47
5.	"Electric Throne" (feat. Kim Benzie of Dead Letter Circus)	6:29
6.	"And We'll Defy"	4:10
7.	"Bodies in the River Nile"	1:23
8.	"Neon Sunrise"	4:33
9.	"Black Hole of My Heart"	6:22
10.	"Nightvision"	4:47
11.	"Drag My Name Through the Mud"	6:42
12.	"The Haunting of Elinor Shaw"	1:25
13.	"Living the Crash"	4:21
14.	"After the War"	5:54
15.	"Little Things" (TrinityRoots cover) (New Zealand/Australian edition only)	3:47

== Personnel ==
I Am Giant

- Ed Martin – vocals
- Shelton Woolright – drums, co-producer
- Paul Matthews – bass guitar, co-producer
- Aja Timu – guitar

Additional personnel

- Forrester Savell – producer

== Charts and certifications ==
=== Chart positions ===
Chart	Peak position
New Zealand Albums Chart	2

=== Certifications ===
Region	Certification	Certified units/sales
New Zealand (RMNZ)	Platinum	15,000^{‡}
^{‡} Sales+streaming figures based on certification alone.
