= Moorhouse (band) =

New Zealand boy band

- Origin: Christchurch, New Zealand
- Genres: Pop, R&B
- Years active: 2012–2015
- Label: Sony Music New Zealand
- Members: Jason Aileone; Brock Ashby; Rory McKenna; Marley Sola Wilcox-Nanai; Rameka Uitime-Paraki

Moorhouse was a New Zealand boy band consisting of members Jason Aileone (born 1993), Brock Ashby (born 1993), Rory McKenna (born 1993), Marley Sola Wilcox-Nanai (born 1995) and Rameka Uitime-Paraki (born 1993). They formed in Christchurch in 2012 and are best known for their appearance in the first New Zealand series of The X Factor where they were the tenth contestant eliminated. Competing in the Groups category, they were mentored by Melanie Blatt. Their debut single "Mama Said" was released in August 2013, peaking at number eight in the New Zealand charts. In February 2015 the band announced it had split up.

== Early life ==
Moorhouse was formed in Christchurch in mid-2012, originally with the line-up of Rory McKenna, Brock Ashby, Jason Aileone and Rameka Uitime-Paraki and eventually made a quintet by the addition of Marley Sola Wilcox-Nanai. The group took their name from their rehearsal studio's location on Moorhouse Avenue, one of the "four avenues" surrounding Christchurch's city centre. The group became known online for their covers of songs uploaded to YouTube. In September 2012 the original quartet performed on TVNZ shows The Erin Simpson Show What Now and Good Morning. In October they won a Mai FM competition to perform as the opening act for Jay Sean's Auckland show. In 2012 Moorhouse met with an A&R representative from Sony Music New Zealand, but nothing eventuated. The group performed at the Parachute music festival in January 2013.

== The X Factor ==
Moorhouse initially attended the Hamilton pre-audition on 29 January 2013, as they were in town for the Parachute music festival. From there were put through to the judges' auditions. At their judges' audition, they performed an a cappella version of Justin Bieber's "As Long as You Love Me". Moorhouse originally auditioned as a five-piece group, but before the bootcamp round, fifth member Rameka left to pursue an opportunity in rugby. Moorhouse competed in the Groups category and were mentored by former All Saints singer Melanie Blatt. Moorhouse were in the bottom two only once, winning the sing-off against hip hop duo L.O.V.E in week three. Moorhouse were eliminated in the semi-final, immediately voted off with the lowest public votes.

== Post-The X Factor ==
After The X Factor, Sony Music New Zealand signed Moorhouse in August 2013. Moorhouse's debut single "Mama Said", which had originally been recorded as their potential The X Factor winner's single, was released digitally on 23 August 2013.

In the summer of 2013-2014, Moorhouse performed at a number of festivals, including the Christmas in the Park event in Christchurch and Parachute music festival.

In 2014, Moorhouse released their second single "Take a Picture", which saw the return of Rameka Uitime-Paraki to the group. A music video accompanied the single soon after. Later in the year they released their third single, "Somebody Loves You", followed by their self-titled debut album Moorhouse. Despite their debut single charting at # 8 in the New Zealand singles chart, neither of their subsequent singles nor their album charted. In February 2015, Moorhouse announced via social media that they had broken up.

== Discography ==
=== Albums ===
Year	Title	Details	Peak chart positions
Year	Title	Details	NZ
2014	Moorhouse	Label: Sony Music Entertainment NZ; Released: 5 December 2014	— (Note: Moorhouse did not enter the Official New Zealand Music Chart, but peaked at number 15 on the New Zealand Artists chart.)
"—" denotes a recording that did not chart or was not released in that territory.

=== Singles ===
Year	Title	Peak chart positions	Album
Year	Title	NZ	Album
2013	"Mama Said"	8	Moorhouse
2014	"Take a Picture"	38 (Note: "Take a Picture" did not enter the Official New Zealand Music Chart, but peaked at number 11 on the New Zealand Artists chart.)	Moorhouse
2014	"Somebody Loves You"	61 (Note: "Somebody Loves You" did not enter the Official New Zealand Music Chart, but peaked at number 14 on the New Zealand Artists chart.)	Moorhouse
"—" denotes a recording that did not chart or was not released in that territory.
