= Science & Survival =

Studio album by I Am Giant
- Released: 4 July 2014
- Genre: Rock
- Label: Sony Music New Zealand
- Producer: Forrester Savell

I Am Giant chronology
The Horrifying Truth (2011)	Science & Survival (2014)

Singles from Science & Survival
- 1. "Razor Wire Reality" Released: December 2013; 2. "Death of You" Released: March 2014

Science & Survival is the second studio album by New Zealand rock band I Am Giant. The album was released on 4 July 2014. The music video for the album's second single, (Death Of You), was shot at Kingseat Hospital.

== Track listing ==
No.	Title	Length
1.	"Guéthary"	0:51
2.	"Echo from the Gallows"	4:25
3.	"Razor Wire Reality"	4:41
4.	"Death of You"	5:20
5.	"Ça vous dérange"	2:04
6.	"Transmission"	3:41
7.	"Out of Date Hallucination"	4:04
8.	"Silhouette"	5:57
9.	"Dragging the Slow Dance Out"	4:26
10.	"Miss Seattle"	0:55
11.	"Minefield"	6:04
12.	"Standing on the Sun (and I Like the View)"	3:16
13.	"Bought with Ignorance, Sold with Arrogance"	12:32

== Charts ==
Chart (2014)	Peak position
New Zealand Albums Chart	2
