= Shelton Woolright =

New Zealand drummer

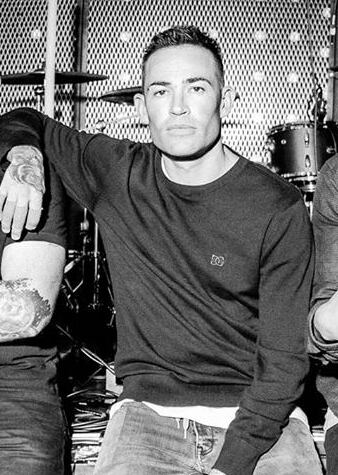
- Woolright in 2017

Background information
- Born: c. 1980; Auckland, New Zealand
- Genre: Rock
- Occupations: Musician; television personality
- Instrument: Drums
- Years active: 1997–present
- Label: Sony
- Formerly of: Blindspott; I Am Giant

Shelton Woolright (born c. 1980) is a New Zealand musician. Born and raised in Auckland, he became the drummer of alternative rock band Blindspott in 1997, before leaving the group in 2008. Later that year, Woolright formed the group I Am Giant in the United Kingdom, before the group returned to New Zealand to produce their music career. Woolright launched his solo project Deadbeat in November 2017.

In March 2015, it was announced that Woolright would become a judge on the second series of The X Factor, replacing the sacked Willy Moon. He mentored Brendon Thomas and the Vibes to the final, where they finished in third place. The X Factor was later cancelled following the airing of the second series.

== Early years ==
Woolright was born in New Zealand. He is of Tongan and French Canadian heritage.

Woolright was the original drummer for the New Zealand band Blindspott whose 2002 debut album reached No 1 and went platinum in New Zealand in its first week. Blindspott broke up in 2007, although Woolright retained an interest in the band. On 15 May 2010, it was announced on Facebook that Blindspott had reunited and were writing new material. As Woolright was not involved this eventually ended with him taking legal action. On 5 March 2011, the Blindspott lead singer Damian Alexander announced it would be releasing its new single From The Blind Spot under the name Blacklistt for legal reasons. Entertainment lawyer Mick Sinclair was handling the case for Blindspott.

== Career ==
=== I Am Giant ===
Following his departure from Blindspott, Woolright formed the band I Am Giant in 2008 with Paul Matthews, Ed Martin and Max O'Donnell. The band went into a hiatus in 2018 after releasing the album Life in captivity.

By 2018 Woolright and the former members of Blindspot had mended their differences and reformed releasing a new single RIP in 2021 and going on tour. They followed this with a new album Volumes in 2022.

=== Deadbeat ===
Woolright launched new solo project Deadbeat in November 2017. Deadbeat is a high energy drum DJ set, which involves Woolright layering live drums over a mashup of the biggest party tunes on the planet.

=== The X Factor ===
In March 2015, it was announced that Woolright would replace the sacked Willy Moon on the second series of the New Zealand version of The X Factor, along with Natalie Bassingthwaighte replacing Moon's wife, Natalia Kills, who was also sacked from the show. Woolright mentored Brendon Thomas and The Vibes to the final where they finished in third place.

== Personal life ==
On 14 March, Shelton put on exhibition of his photography L'Art reflète la vie at the Viaduct in Auckland. The Auckland exhibition was to raise funds for Cure Kids, a child cancer sponsor. He had first put his photography on display in Paris at The Hub, 5 rue Montorgueil on 12 February 2015. In 2015, Woolright was called out for his use of blackface.
