= Lili Bayliss =

New Zealand singer

- Born: Lili Bayliss; 1993 (age 31–32); Wellington, New Zealand
- Genres: Indie pop, alternative pop, pop
- Occupation(s): Singer, actress
- Instrument(s): Vocals, guitar
- Years active: 2011–present

Lili Bayliss (born 1993) is a New Zealand singer from Wellington who was the eighth contestant eliminated on the second season of The X Factor (New Zealand).

== Early life ==
Bayliss was born in Wellington, New Zealand in 1993. Prior to auditioning for The X Factor she was a student at Otago University. Bayliss had a regular role in Peter Jackson's films. She has a credit in the Peter Jackson film The Lovely Bones where she played "Mr Harvey's victim". Bayliss also appears in other films such as The Lord of the Rings and The Hobbit. In 2013 she appeared in the music video for "Down" by Welsh singer Gareth Barker.

== The X Factor ==
Bayliss attended the pre-auditions of the second season of New Zealand reality show The X Factor in Wellington in November 2014 and advanced through to the judges' auditions. Bayliss performed The Black Keys' song "Lonely Boy" at her audition and received positive feedback from the judges which advanced her to bootcamp. She performed "Summertime Sadness" at bootcamp during the Six Chair Challenge where she progressed through to Judges Retreats with mentor Stan Walker. Her week one cover of "Rude" reached No. 18 in the New Zealand artists' singles chart, however, she found herself in the bottom and competing in the final showdown against Stuss. The judges couldn't vote on whom to send home and sent the result to deadlock. Bayliss was announced as the act with more votes and was saved. In week three she found herself in the bottom two and again had to compete in the final showdown against Fare Thee Well. Bayliss won the vote 3–1 and was saved. Her week four mashup of "Tainted Love"/"Sweet Dreams (Are Made of This)" reached number 14 in the same chart. After being announced as safe for two consecutive weeks, Bayliss found herself in the bottom two again in Week 6 after her performance of The Ting Tings' "That's Not My Name". She competed in the final showdown against country duo Mae Valley and was saved by the judges progressing her through to the Top 6. However, voting statistics revealed that Mae Valley received more votes than Bayliss, which meant that if the result went to deadlock, Bayliss would have been eliminated. Bayliss has been praised for her unique image and tendency to change up songs. Bayliss again found herself in the bottom two against Stevie Tonks in Week 7 after her mashup of "Back to Black"/"Bang Bang (My Baby Shot Me Down)". She performed "Blue Jeans" as her save me song but was eliminated from the competition with 3 out of 4 judges voting to send her home. Bayliss was the eighth contestant eliminated in the competition.

== Discography ==
=== Digital releases from The X Factor ===
Title	Peak Positions
Title	NZ Artists
"Rude"	18
"Earned It"	48
"Only Girl (In the World)"	–
"Tainted Love"/"Sweet Dreams (Are Made of This)"	14
"The A Team"	–
"That's Not My Name"	46
"Back to Black"	64
"-" denotes a single that did not chart.
