= Stevie Tonks =

- Born: Stephen Reuben Tonkin; 1992 (age 32–33); Christchurch, New Zealand
- Genres: Rock, indie pop, pop, soul
- Occupation: Singer
- Instrument(s): Vocals, piano, guitar
- Years active: 2015–present

Stephen Reuben Tonkin, known as Stevie Tonks, (born 1992) is a New Zealand singer from Christchurch, who was the tenth contestant eliminated on the second season of The X Factor (New Zealand). In the boys category he was mentored by Natalie Bassingthwaighte, and before that by Natalia Kills.

== Early life ==
Tonks was born in Christchurch, New Zealand in 1992. Prior to auditioning for The X Factor, he was a performing arts student at the Southern Institute of Technology.

== Musical influence ==
Tonks cites Sia, Jeff Buckley and Michael Jackson as his main musical influences.

== The X Factor ==
Tonks attended the pre-auditions for the second series of New Zealand reality show The X Factor in Christchurch in November 2014 and advanced through to the judges' auditions. Tonks performed the U2 song "I Still Haven't Found What I'm Looking For" at his audition and received positive feedback from all four judges who advanced him through to bootcamp. He sang "Jealous" for the "Six Chair Challenge" at bootcamp and progressed through to judges retreats with mentor Natalia Kills and then by Natalie Bassingthwaighte after Kills was fired from the show. He then sang his version of "Recovery" at judges retreats causing then mentor Natalia Kills to cry. He soon advanced to the live shows as one of the Top 13. His week one cover of "Young and Beautiful" reached No.5 in the New Zealand artists' singles chart, and his week four cover of "Crazy" also reached No. 5 in the same chart. Tonks found himself in the bottom two in Week 7 after his performance of "Billie Jean" failed to impress. He sang "Grenade" in the final showdown against Lili Bayliss and was saved by the judges with only Stan Walker voting to send Bayliss through to the quarter-final. Tonks found himself in the bottom two again in the quarter-final against Steve Broad. He was again saved by the judges with only Melanie Blatt voting to send Broad through to the semi-final. However, voting statistics revealed that Broad received more votes than Tonks, which meant that if the result went to deadlock, Broad would have advanced to the semi-final and Tonks would have been eliminated. In the semi-final Tonks was eliminated in the final showdown with Brendon Thomas and The Vibes, and only mentor Natalie Bassingthwaighte voting to send Tonks through to the final. However, voting statistics revealed that Tonks received more votes than Brendon Thomas and The Vibes, which meant that if the result went to deadlock, Tonks would have advanced to the final and Brendon Thomas and The Vibes would have been eliminated.

== Discography ==
=== Digital releases from The X Factor ===
Title	Peak Positions
Title	NZ Artists
"Young and Beautiful"	5
"Like I Can"	98
"Are You Gonna Be My Girl"	86
"Crazy"	5
"Give Me Love"	14
"Hold Back the River"	45
"Billie Jean"	–
"Oh My"	–
"Fix You"	46
"Some Nights"	–
"-" denotes a single that did not chart.
