= King and Queen (song) =

Single by Beau Monga

from the album Beau Monga
- Released: May 18, 2015
- Recorded: May 2015, Auckland, New Zealand
- Genre: Pop, Hip hop, Beatbox
- Length: 3:36
- Label: Sony Music New Zealand
- Songwriter: Beau Monga
- Producer: Soko Lapez

Beau Monga singles chronology
"Hit the Road Jack" (2014)	"King and Queen" (2015)

"King and Queen" is the winner's single by the second New Zealand series winner of The X Factor, Beau Monga. It was released digitally on 18 May 2015 and on CD single in June, as the lead single from his self-titled debut album. "King and Queen" was written solely by Beau Monga and produced by Soko Lapez. It debuted at number two on the Official New Zealand Music Chart and number one on the New Zealand Artist chart.

== Background and release ==
"King and Queen" was written solely by Beau Monga. The single was released for digital download on the evening of The X Factor grand final on 18 May, with the CD single release in June.

== Reception ==
"King and Queen" debuted at number two on the New Zealand Singles Chart on 22 May 2015.

== Live performances ==
Monga performed "King and Queen" live for the first time during The X Factor grand final show on 18 May. Monga performed the song again later in the show after he was announced as the winner. On 19 May 2015, he appeared on The Paul Henry Show for an interview, and sang "King and Queen" afterward.

== Track listing ==
- CD single / digital download
1. "King and Queen" – 3:36

== Release history ==
Country	Date	Format	Label
New Zealand	18 May 2015	Digital download	Sony Music New Zealand
New Zealand	June 2015	CD single	Sony Music New Zealand

== Chart positions ==
Chart (2015)	Peak position
New Zealand (Recorded Music NZ)	2
