= Mae Valley (duo) =

New Zealand country music duo

- Genres: Country pop, popular music
- Years active: 2015–2017
- Labels: Sony Music Entertainment New Zealand
- Past members: Abby Christodoulou; Hannah Cosgrove

Mae Valley was a New Zealand country music duo consisting of Abby Christodoulou and Hannah Cosgrove. The duo was formed on the second series of the New Zealand show of The X Factor and were managed by SMOKE.

== 2015: The X Factor ==
Mae Valley participated in the live shows of The X Factor. They were eliminated in the sixth week, losing the sing-off to Lili Bayliss, following a majority vote from the judges. However, voting statistics revealed that Mae Valley received more votes than Bayliss, which meant that if the result went to deadlock, Bayliss would have been eliminated.

== Discography ==
=== Extended plays ===
List of extend plays, with selected chart positions
Title	Album details	Peak chart positions	
Title	Album details	NZ	NZ Artist
Mae Valley	Released: 18 March 2016; Label: Sony Music Entertainment New Zealand; Format: CD, digital download	6	3
"—" denotes a recording that did not chart or was not released in that territory.

=== Singles ===
Year	Single	Peak chart positions		Album
Year	Single	NZ	NZ Artist	Album
2015	"Brightside"	—	10	Mae Valley
2016	"Turns Out"	—	—	TBA
"—" denotes a recording that did not chart or was not released in that territory.
