= Brendon Thomas and The Vibes =

New Zealand rock band

- Origin: Auckland, New Zealand
- Genres: Blues rock; alternative rock; soul
- Years active: 2013 – 2018
- Members: Brendon Thomas; Timothee "Tim" Nolier; Michael Anderson

Brendon Thomas and The Vibes is a New Zealand rock band consisting of members Brendon Thomas (born 1995), Timothee Nolier (born 1995), and Michael Anderson (born 1995). They formed in Auckland in 2013 and was the last contestant eliminated on the second series of the New Zealand version of The X Factor. Competing in the Groups category, they were mentored by Willy Moon then Shelton Woolwright. They are the first band in the New Zealand version of The X Factor to make it into the final.

== Musical influence ==
Brendon Thomas and The Vibes cite Jimi Hendrix, Led Zeppelin, Cream, John Mayer, Stevie Ray Vaughan, Pink Floyd, The Beatles The Who as their main musical influences.

== The X Factor ==
With the inclusion of bands in the second series (an X Factor franchise first), Brendon Thomas and The Vibes attended the pre-auditions for the second series of New Zealand reality show The X Factor in Auckland in November 2014 and advanced through to the judges' auditions. They performed "Foxy Lady" at their audition and received positive feedback from all four judges who advanced them through to bootcamp. They performed "Georgia On My Mind" at judges retreats where then mentor Willy Moon advanced them to the live shows. With the firing of their original mentor, Willy Moon, after the first live show, I Am Giant drummer Shelton Woolwright took over as the mentor for the groups category. Brendon Thomas and The Vibes found themselves in the bottom two for the first time in week 4 against Sarah Spicer, after their performance of "My Sharona" received mix comments from the judges. They performed "Power of Soul" as their save me song. The result went to deadlock and Brendon Thomas and The Vibes were announced safe with more public votes than Sarah Spicer. Brendon Thomas and The Vibes found themselves again in the bottom two in the semi-final against Stevie Tonks. With a spot in the grand final up for grabs they performed "My Generation" and won the judges vote with only Tonk's mentor Natalie Bassingthwaighte voting to send Tonks through to the final. However, voting statistics revealed that Tonks received more votes than Brendon Thomas and The Vibes, which meant that if the result went to deadlock, Tonks would have advanced to the final and Brendon Thomas and The Vibes would have been eliminated. In the final, Brendon Thomas and the Vibes were revealed as having received the lowest number of public votes against Nyssa Collins and Beau Monga and were instantly eliminated. This saw them bring the last contestant eliminated. They are officially the first band in X Factor history to make it into a grand final.

== Discography ==
=== Digital releases from The X Factor ===
Title	Peak Positions
Title	NZ Artists
"Lonely Boy"	43
"Budapest"	12
"I'm Shakin"	30
"My Sharona"	-
"Make It Rain"	13
"Little Monster"	-
"Higher Ground"	-
"Bathe in the River"	57
"Another Brick In The Wall"	46
"Imagine"/"You Can't Always Get What You Want"	76
"Are You Gonna Go My Way"	-
"(Sittin On) The Dock of the Bay"	-
"-" denotes a single that did not chart.

=== EPs ===
Title	Year	Peak Positions
Title	Year	New Zealand Charts
"The Eclect"	2014	12
"Wrap You In The Sun"	2017	-
"-" denotes a single that did not chart.
