= Steve Broad =

- Born: 29 January 1986 (age 39); Invercargill, New Zealand
- Genres: R&B, Pop
- Occupation(s): Singer, teacher
- Instrument(s): Vocals, piano
- Years active: 2005–present

Steve James Broad (born 29 January 1986) is a New Zealand singer and radio presenter, known for coming 5th on the second season of the New Zealand edition of The X Factor and 3rd on the second season of New Zealand Idol. He was elected to the Invercargill City Council in 2023.

== Early life ==
Broad was born in Invercargill in 1986, growing up on a sheep farm. As a teen he worked at H & J Smith.

== Career ==
Broad competed in the second season of New Zealand Idol at the age of 19, eventually placing 3rd. Despite doing well in the competition, Broad later spoke of nearly giving up on music due to criticism from the media and the public. Two years later, Broad competed in Pop's Ultimate Star against other former reality television contestants. He placed 8th. Broad worked for The Edge in Auckland while he studied law before switching to a teaching degree, which he completed back in Invercargill after five years. He then got a job teaching at Southland Boys' High School. In 2012, he contested a by-election for the Invercargill City Council prompted by the resignation of Jackie Kruger, coming third with 2,453 votes.

After performing in some local theatre and uploading cover songs to YouTube, in 2015 Broad decided to compete in the second series of New Zealand's The X Factor, where he was placed in Melanie Blatt's Over 25s group. He was eliminated in the quarter-final, placing 5th. After The X Factor, Broad moved back to Auckland to teach at Remuera Primary School. There he was flatmates with The Bachelor New Zealand contestant Gabrielle Davenport and Treasure Island contestant Carolyn Taylor. He later moved back to Invercargill to work as a radio host on More FM and then to Christchurch to work as a MediaWorks New Zealand manager. He returned to hosting More FM in Invercargill after his mother died in 2021.

In 2023, he again contested a by-election for the Invercargill City Council, this time prompted by the resignation of Nigel Skelt. He was successfully elected, with a margin of over 1,000 votes ahead of second place.

Broad is running for re-election to the council in the 2025 local elections.

== Personal life ==
Broad came out as gay after The X Factor, during which there had been frequent media speculation of his relationship with judge Melanie Blatt. He is a Christian, having attended Pentecostal and Presbyterian churches since his youth.

== Discography ==
=== Digital releases from The X Factor ===
Title	Peak Positions
Title	NZ Artists
"Drunk In Love"	87
"Jealous"	–
"Summertime Sadness"	69
"Stay"	65
"Blank Space"	86
"Ghost"	85
"Climax"	–
"Always On My Mind"	–
"-" denotes a single that did not chart.
