= The X Factor (New Zealand TV series) =

New Zealand TV series

- Genre: Reality competition
- Created by: Simon Cowell
- Presented by: Dominic Bowden
- Judges: Melanie Blatt; Stan Walker; Ruby Frost; Daniel Bedingfield; Willy Moon; Natalia Kills; Shelton Woolright; Natalie Bassingthwaighte
- Country of origin: New Zealand
- Original language: English
- No. of series: 2
- No. of episodes: 58

Production
- Executive producer: Andrew Szusterman
- Producers: MediaWorks; FremantleMedia Australia

Original release
- Network: TV3
- Release: 21 April 2013 – 18 May 2015

Related
- The Xtra Factor; The X Factor (British TV series); The X Factor (Australian TV series); The X Factor (American TV series)

The X Factor is a New Zealand television reality music competition, originating from the original British series and based on the Australian The X Factor production format. The show began in 2013 and was open to anyone aged 14 and over. The winner was signed to Sony Music Entertainment New Zealand.

The contestants were split into the show's four traditional categories: Boys, Girls, Over 25s and Groups. From the second series, bands were also able to enter in the group category.

The show was cancelled in 2017, with MediaWorks confirming that the format rights to the show had expired.

== History ==
The X Factor was created by Simon Cowell in the United Kingdom and the New Zealand version is based on the original British series. TV3 initially purchased the rights to produce a local version of The X Factor in 2010. In September 2012, TV3 finally confirmed that the first series would begin production in early 2013. Broadcast funding agency NZ On Air confirmed they would contribute $1.6 million to the first series as a minority investor, for the production of 30 episodes of 60 minutes duration each.

== Presenter and Judges ==
Presenter and Judges gallery

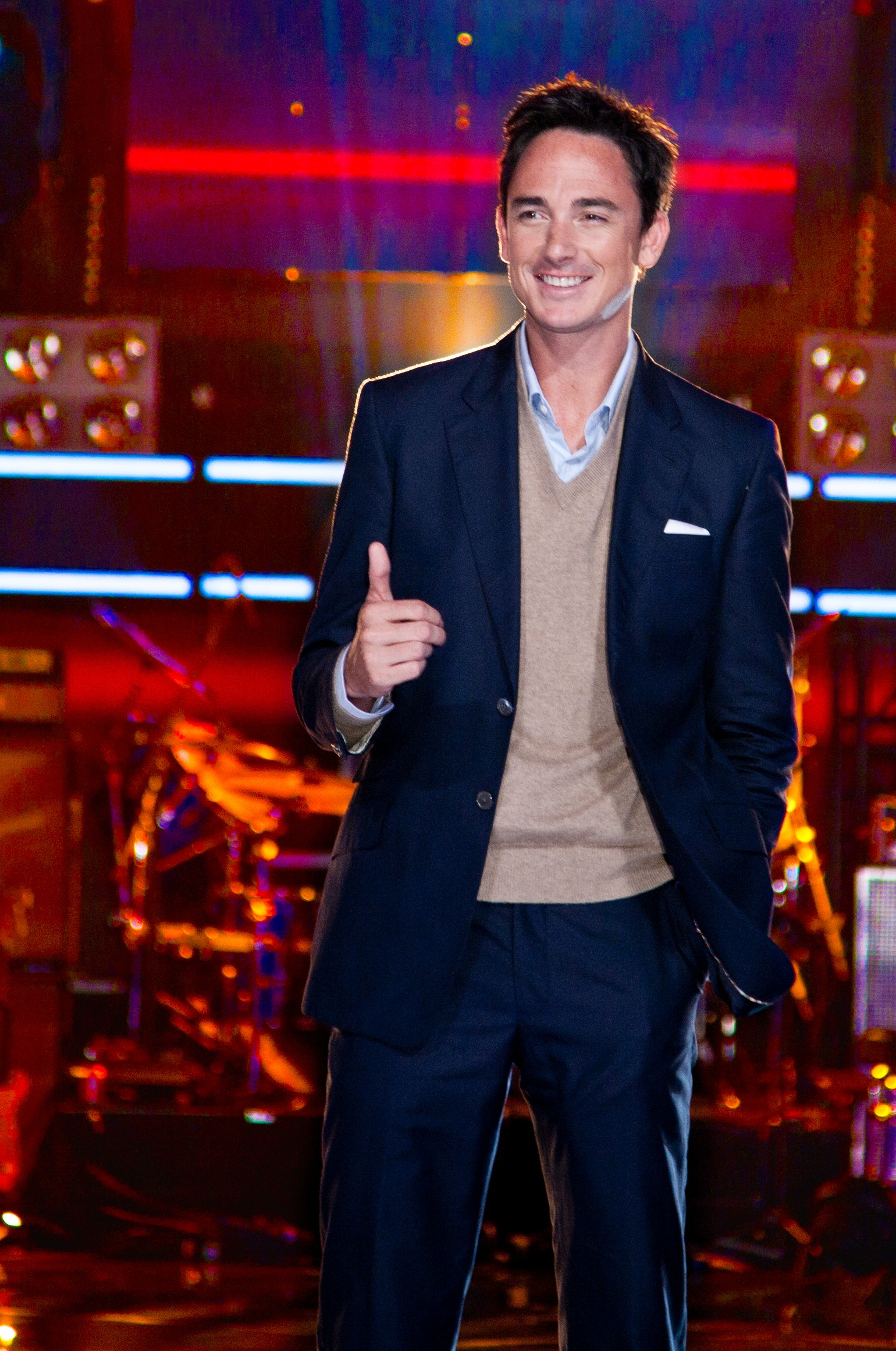
Dominic Bowden (2013–15) Presenter

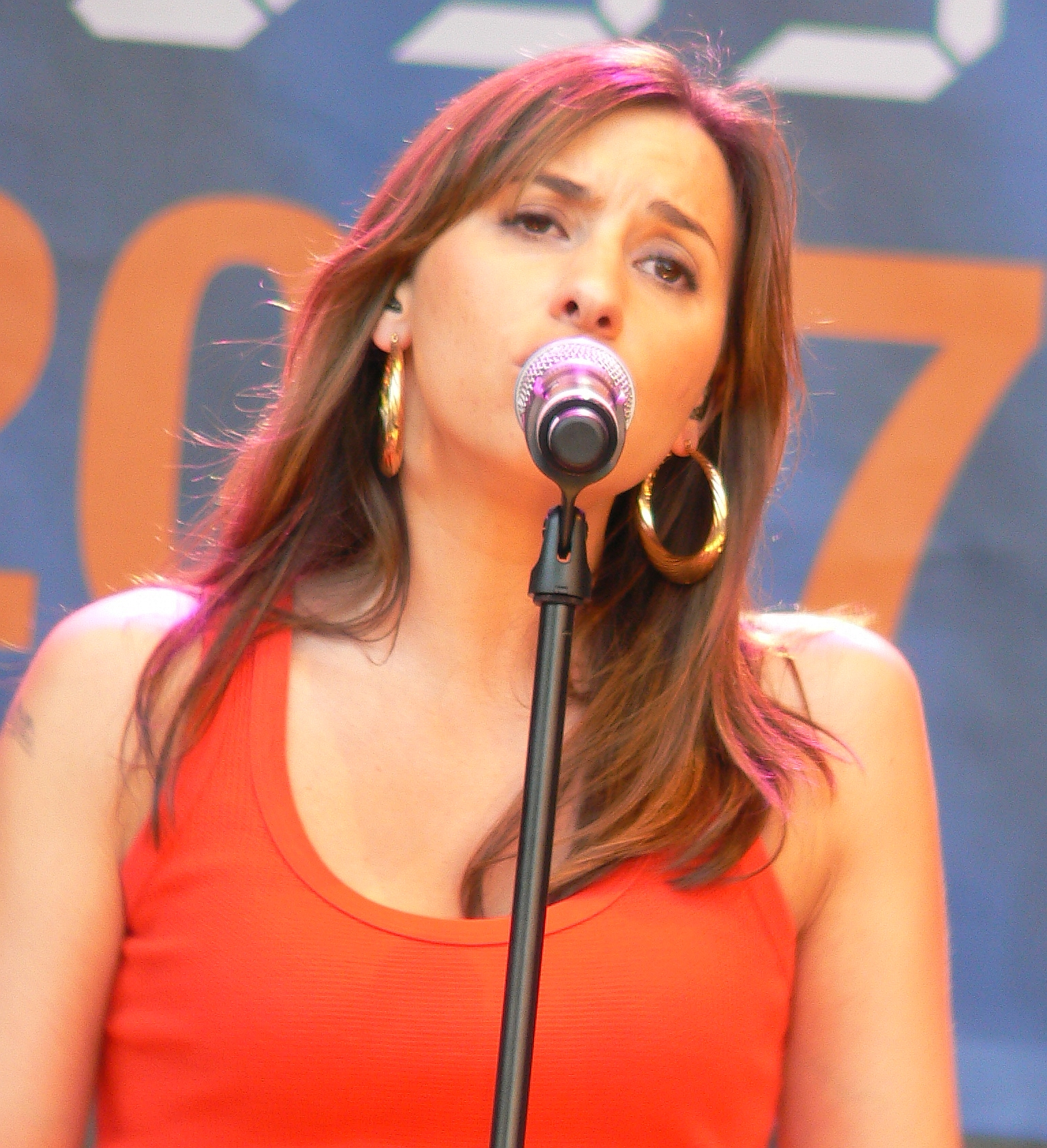
Melanie Blatt (2013–15)

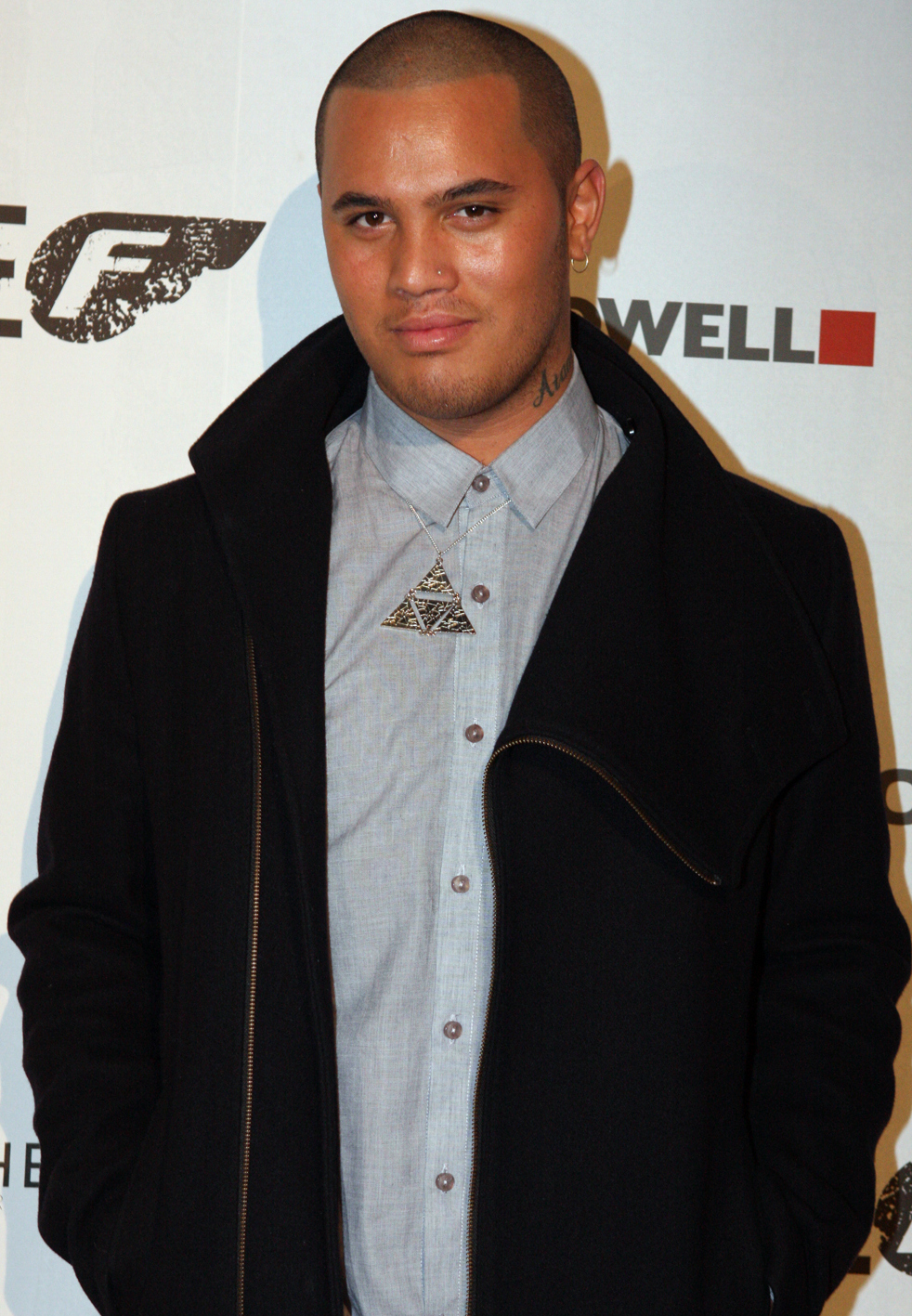
Stan Walker (2013–15)

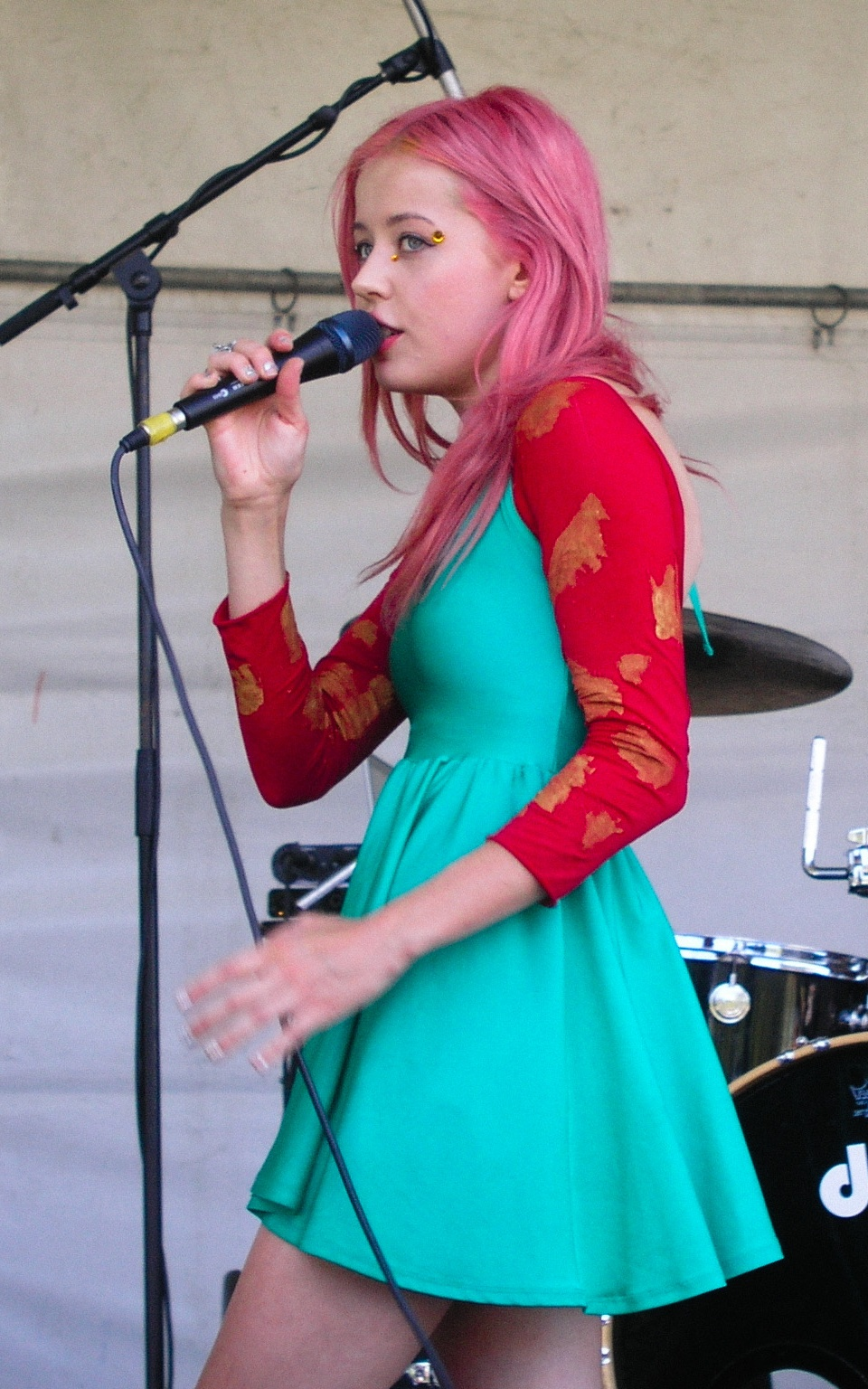
Ruby Frost (2013)

Daniel Bedingfield (2013)

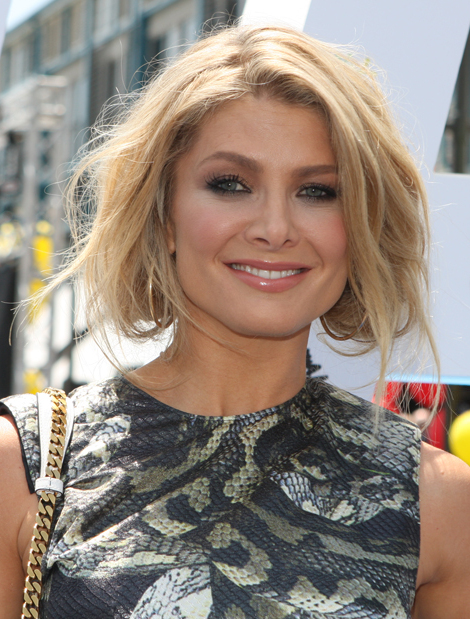
Natalie Bassingthwaighte (2015) Live shows 2 –10 weeks

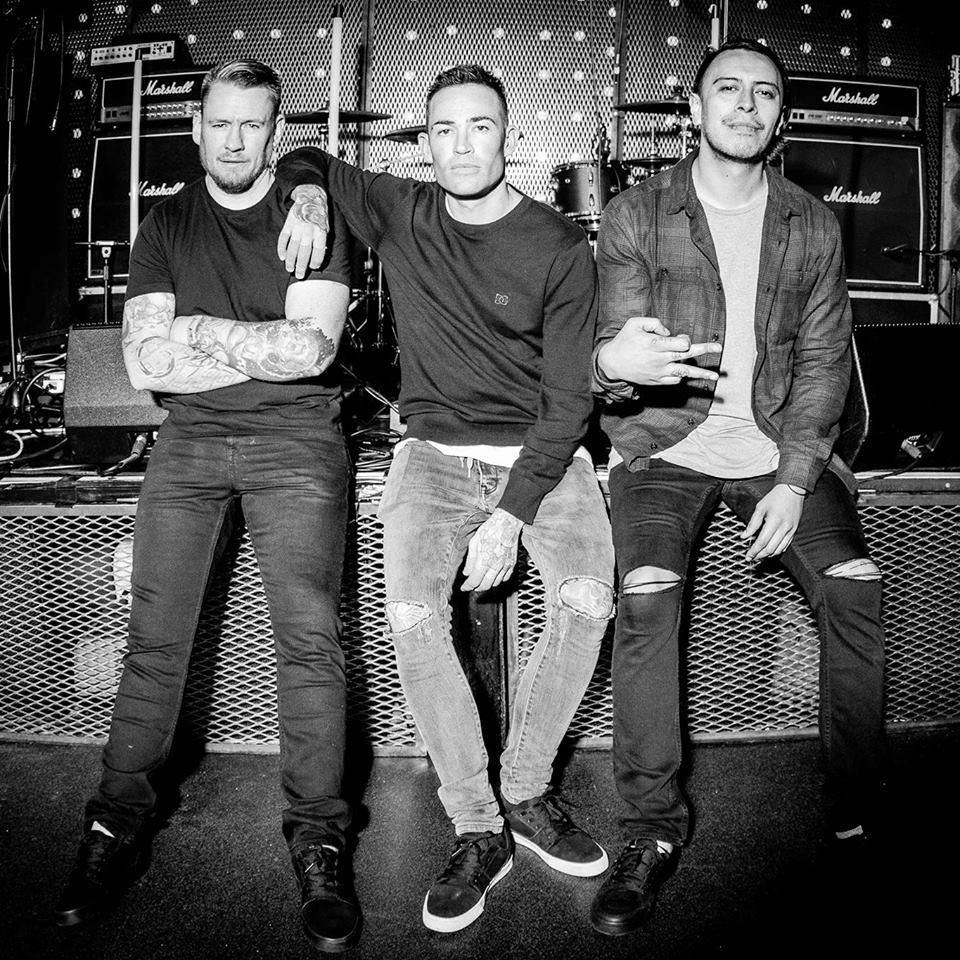
Shelton Woolright (2015) Live shows 2– 10 weeks.

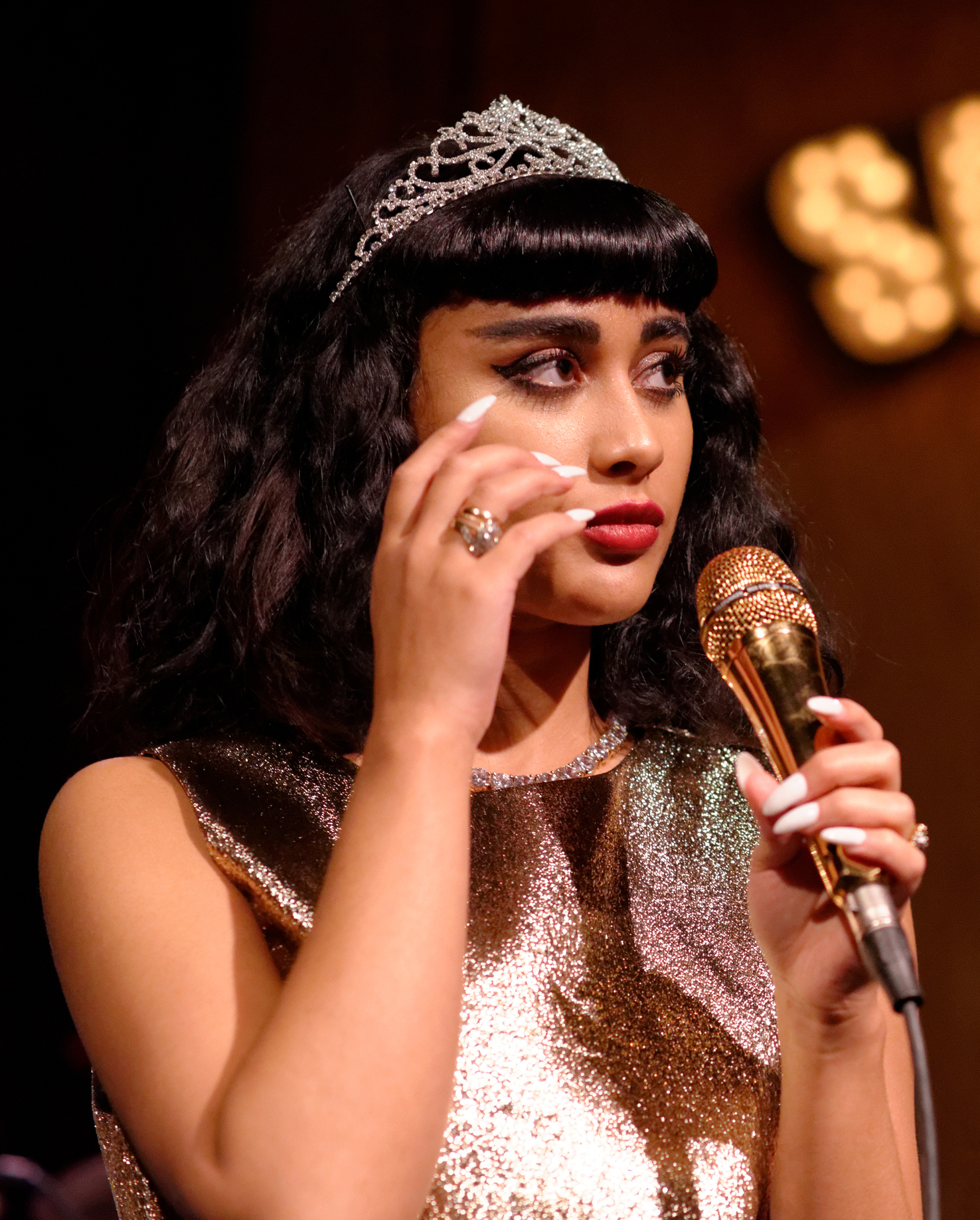
Natalia Kills (2015) Auditions- Lives show week 1

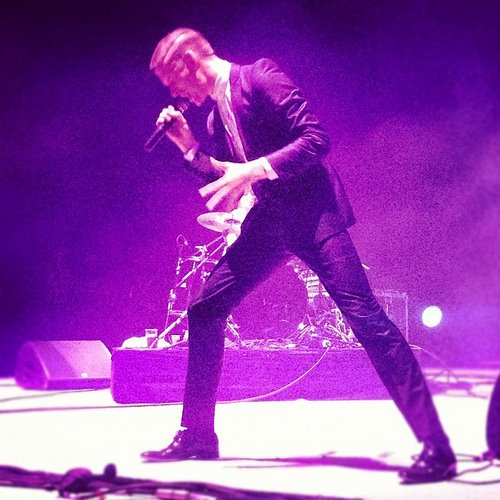
Willy Moon (2015) Auditions- Lives show week 1

Dominic Bowden was the sole-host of both of the seasons of The X Factor.

The judging panel for the first season was composed of All Saints member Melanie Blatt, Australian-born Maori, New Zealand singer-songwriter Ruby Frost and Australian Idol winner Stan Walker and New Zealand-born, UK-based singer-songwriter Daniel Bedingfield.

Upon the return of Season 2, Walker and Blatt returned as judges., and were joined originally by New Zealand-born singer Willy Moon and his wife, English singer Natalia Kills. However, Moon and Kills were fired from their roles as judges after the two humiliated a contestant. They were replaced by Australian X Factor judge Natalie Bassingthwaighte and kiwi drummer of Blindspott and I Am Giant, Shelton Woolright.

== Season 1 (2013) ==
The first series was co-produced by MediaWorks and FremantleMedia Australia. The series' key sponsors were Ford New Zealand as broadcast sponsor, Samsung Electronics as technology partner with McDonald's and Coca-Cola as programme partners.

The judging panel for season one consisted of All Saints singer Melanie Blatt, Australian Idol winner Stan Walker, Kiwi singer Ruby Frost and New Zealand-born singer/songwriter Daniel Bedingfield. The judges were accompanied by Dominic Bowden who hosted the series. The series premiered on 21 April 2013 and finished on 22 July 2013. For the judges retreat, judges were assigned or selected an assistant judge to assist their choices, as well as taking their contestants international. Bedingfield was assisted by singer/songwriter and sister Natasha Bedingfield and travelled to Rarotonga, Blatt was assisted by Rachel Stevens and travelled to Mahurangi, Frost was assisted by X Factor Australia judge, Guy Sebastian and travelled to Sydney and Walker was assisted by Hollie Smith and went to Queenstown. Jackie Thomas was announced as X Factor NZ winner for 2013, with Whenua Patuwai placing second and Benny Tipene coming in third place.

== Season 2 (2015) ==
A second season of The X Factor was not included in TV3's 2014 line-up, however in August 2014 TV3 confirmed that a second season of the show would be made. Production began in November 2014 and it was confirmed that the series would screen in 2015. NZ On Air contributed $800,000 minority funding to the second series. The broadcast sponsor of the second series were McDonald's, with Mazda, Fruttare, 2degrees and VO5 as programme partners.

The judging panel for the second season saw Husband and Wife Duo, Natalia Kills (now known as Teddy Sinclair) and Willy Moon join original judges Melanie Blatt and Stan Walker. Dominic Bowden returned to host season two. Again in season two, judges retreat went international with the help of celebrity guests. Blatt was assisted by Nicole Appleton and travelled to Pattaya. Walker was assisted by Ginny Blackmore and travelled to Bangkok. Moon was assisted by former New Zealand's Got Talent judge, Jason Kerrison and travelled to Karaka and Kills was assisted by former X Factor New Zealand contestant, Benny Tipene and travelled to Titirangi. On 15 March 2015 during the first live episode of The X Factor, Kills and Moon bullied and verbally attacked a contestant, Joe Irvine from the Over 25s. The next day, several hours before that day's episode aired, it was announced that the two judges had been fired from the show. That night's episode saw only Walker and Blatt attend the panel. Kills and Moon were replaced by X Factor Australia judge, Natalie Bassingthwaighte and kiwi-born, I am Giant drummer - Shelton Woolwright. The series was won by Bassingthwaighte's contestant, Beau Monga. Nyssa Collins placed second and Brendon Thomas and the Vibes followed in third.

== Cancellation ==
In March 2015, it was announced that NZ on Air would not provide any funding for future series, making a third series less likely. In October 2015, Mediaworks confirmed that it would not be producing a third series of The X Factor in 2016. Mediaworks would not say whether the series would return in 2017, however they did note that the series usually ran once every 2 years.

In 2017, MediaWorks confirmed that the format rights to the show had expired, thus revealing that plans for a third series had officially been cancelled.

== Selection process ==
There are five stages to the competition:

- Stage 1: Pre-auditions (these auditions decide who will sing in front of the judges)
- Stage 2: Judges' auditions
- Stage 3: Bootcamp - Six-Chair Challenge
- Stage 4: Judges' retreats
- Stage 5: Live shows (finals)

The X Factor stage

Pre-auditions in front of the show's producers were held in towns and cities across New Zealand. The successful auditionees chosen by the producers were invited back to the last set of auditions held in front of the judges and a live studio audience in Auckland. From the judges' auditions and the second-chance Fast Ford Boot Camp (first series only), successful contestants then progressed to the bootcamp round. In the second series, the bootcamp included a live studio audience and used a six-seat challenge to choose the contestants to progress to the judges retreats' round. At the retreats, contestants are divided into the four categories: Boys, Girls, Over-25s and Groups, and each category is assigned one of the judges as a mentor. Each judge then selects their top three contestants which make up the final 12 and progress to the live shows. In the first series, one additional wildcard contestant was selected by public vote from four previously unsuccessful contestants from judges retreats, making the final 13.

The live shows consist of two weekly live shows, the first featuring the contestants' performances and the second revealing the results of the public voting, culminating in one act being eliminated each week. In the initial live performance shows, each act performs one song (two songs during the semi-final and grand final shows) in front of the judges and a studio audience. The acts usually sing over a pre-recorded backing track, and backup dancers are commonly featured as well as stage props. Acts occasionally accompany themselves on guitar or piano. Each week has a different theme; each act's song is chosen according to the theme. After each act has performed, the judges comment on their performance. Heated disagreements, usually involving judges defending their acts against criticism, are a regular feature of the show. Once all the acts have performed, the phone lines open and the viewing public vote on which act they want to keep in the competition.

The results are announced during the live results show the following day. The two acts that received the lowest number of votes perform again in the "final showdown", and the judges vote on which of the two to send home. If the judges vote is a tie, the showdown goes to deadlock and the act with the lowest number of votes is eliminated from the competition. The live results shows also feature a number of celebrity guest performers.

== Series overview ==
Two series were broadcast, as summarised below.

Act in Team Daniel
Act in Team Ruby
Act in Team Stan
Act in Team Melanie
Act in Team Shelton
Act in Team Natalie

Season	Premiere	Finale	Winner	Runner-Up	Winning Mentor	Presenters	Judges - Seat Order			
Season	Premiere	Finale	Winner	Runner-Up	Winning Mentor	Presenters	1	2	3	4
1	21 April 2013	22 July 2013	Jackie Thomas; Girls	Whenua Patuwai; Boys	Daniel Bedingfield	Dominic Bowden	Melanie Blatt	Stan Walker	Ruby Frost	Daniel Bedingfield
2	15 February 2015	18 May 2015	Beau Monga; Boys	Nyssa Collins; Girls	Natalie Bassingthwaighte	Dominic Bowden	Melanie Blatt	Stan Walker	Natalie Bassingthwaighte*	Shelton Woolright*

*Natalia Kills and Willy Moon were removed from the panel following an incident during the first live show.

== Judges' categories and their contestants ==
In each series, after the audition process, each judge is allocated a category to mentor. Throughout the mentoring process, each judge chooses three acts to progress to the live finals in that specified team. The table below shows, for each series, which category each judge is allocated and which acts he or she put through to the live finals.

– Winning judge/category. Winners are in bold, eliminated contestants in small font.

Series	Melanie Blatt	Stan Walker	Ruby Frost	Daniel Bedingfield
1	**Groups**; Moorhouse; Gap5; L.O.V.E	**Over 25s** Anna Wilson; Maaka Fiso; Taye Williams	**Boys**; Whenua Patuwai; Benny Tipene; Tom Batchelor; Fletcher Mills	**Girls**; **Jackie Thomas**; Cassie Henderson; Eden Roberts
2	Melanie Blatt	Stan Walker	Natalie Bassingthwaighte	Shelton Woolright
2	**Over 25s** Steve Broad; Joe Irvine; Sarah Spicer	**Girls**; Nyssa Collins; Lili Bayliss; Finlay Robertson	**Boys**; **Beau Monga**; Stevie Tonks; Nofo Lameko	**Groups**; Brendon Thomas and The Vibes; Mae Valley; Fare Thee Well; Stuss

== The X Factor discography ==
The discography of The X Factor consists of music releases from contestants of the show. While some contestants have been signed to record labels, others have released their music independently. Recordings of contestants' weekly performances from The X Factor live shows were released onto the iTunes Store in the second series, and a number of those performances charted on the NZ Singles Chart.

Benny Tipene is the most successful act to emerge from The X Factor NZ; he was the only act to chart internationally.

=== Albums ===
==== Series 1 acts ====
Act	Title	Release date	Peak chart positions	Certifications
Act	Title	Release date	NZ	Certifications
Jackie Thomas	"Jackie Thomas"	9 August 2013	1	RMNZ: Gold
Jackie Thomas	"Until The Last Goodbye EP"	12 June 2015	—	—N/a
Benny Tipene	"Toulouse" EP	28 February 2014	2	—N/a
Benny Tipene	"Bricks"	17 October 2014	4	—N/a
Whenua Patuwai	"The Soul Sessions"	27 June 2014	4	—N/a
Whenua Patuwai	"The Soul Sessions: Christmas Edition"	5 December 2014	—	—N/a
Moorhouse	"Moorhouse"	5 December 2014	55	
"-" denotes an album that did not chart.

==== Series 2 acts ====
Act	Title	Release date	Peak chart positions	Certifications
Act	Title	Release date	NZ	Certifications
Brendon Thomas and The Vibes	"The Eclect"	8 April 2014	12	—N/a
Beau Monga	"Beau Monga"	19 June 2015	2	RMNZ: Gold
Sarah Spicer	"Colours"	16 April 2015	—	—N/a
Joe Irvine	"The Heart of Christmas"	11 December 2015	—	—N/a
Mae Valley	"Mae Valley EP"	17 March 2016	6	—N/a
"-" denotes an album that did not chart.

=== Singles ===
==== Series 1 acts ====
Year	Artist	Title	Peak chart positions		Certifications
Year	Artist	Title	NZ	AUS	Certifications
2013	Jackie Thomas	"It's Worth It"	1	—	RMNZ: Platinum
2013	Whenua Patuwai	"Something Special"	3	—	—N/a
2013	Benny Tipene	"Walking on Water"	2	—	RMNZ: Platinum
2013	Moorhouse	"Mama Said"	8	—	—N/a
2013	Benny Tipene	"Make You Mine"	15	56	RMNZ: Gold
2014	Moorhouse	"Take a Picture"	38	—	—N/a
2014	Moorhouse	"Somebody Loves You"	61	—	—N/a
2014	Maaka Fiso	"Movin' On"	—	—	—N/a
2014	L.O.V.E	"Bubblegum"	—	—	—N/a
2014	Gap5	"Hold On"	—	—	—N/a
2014	Tom Batchelor	"Waiting For You"	—	—	—N/a
2014	Benny Tipene	"Lonely"	24	—	—N/a
2014	Benny Tipene	"Step On Up"	14	—	RMNZ: Gold
2014	Taye Williams	"Now or Never"	1	—	—N/a
2014	Taye Williams	"Ready to Love"	—	—	—N/a
2015	Jackie Thomas	"Until The Last Goodbye"	35	—	—N/a
2015	Jackie Thomas	"Stars"	—	—	—N/a
2015	Benny Tipene	"Lanterns"	22	—	—N/a
2015	Gap5	"Hold On Part II"	—	—	—N/a
"-" denotes a single that did not chart.

==== Series 2 acts ====
Year	Artist	Title	Peak chart positions	Certifications
Year	Artist	Title	NZ	Certifications
2015	Beau Monga	"King and Queen"	1	RMNZ: Gold
2015	Nyssa Collins	"18"	24	—N/a
2015	Stevie Tonks	"So Lonely"	—	—N/a
2015	Stevie Tonks	"I Will Rise"	—	—N/a
2015	Brendon Thomas and The Vibes	"In My Life"	—	—N/a
2015	Brendon Thomas and The Vibes	"Let the Good Times Roll"	—	—N/a
2015	Joe Irvine	"Little Dress"	—	—N/a
2015	Joe Irvine	"The Heart of Christmas"	—	—N/a
2015	Sarah Spicer	"Understand My Love"	—	—N/a
2015	Sarah Spicer	"Colours"	—	—N/a
2015	Sarah Spicer	"Little Bit of Rain"	—	—N/a
2016	Mae Valley	"Brightside"	10	TBA
2016	Mae Valley	"Glitter"	—	TBA
2016	Finlay Tate	"Control"	—	TBA
"-" denotes a single that did not chart.

=== Other singles ===
==== Charity singles ====
Title	Year	Peak chart positions	Certifications
Title	Year	NZ	Certifications
"Song For Everyone"	11 August 2014	5	—N/a
"Fight Song"	13 April 2015	13	—N/a
"-" denotes a single that did not chart.

=== Other charted songs ===
==== Series 1 performances ====
Act	Title	Peak positions
Act	Title	NZ
Benny Tipene	"Laura"	33
Jackie Thomas	"Skinny Love"	23

==== Series 2 performances ====
Act	Title	Peak positions
Act	Title	NZ Artists
Stevie Tonks	"Young and Beautiful"	5
Mae Valley	"If I Die Young"	10
Lili Bayliss	"Rude"	18
Brendon Thomas and the Vibes	"Budapest"	12
Nyssa Collins	"How Will I Know"	19
Stevie Tonks	"Crazy"	5
Lili Bayliss	"Tainted Love"/"Sweet Dreams (Are Made of This)	14
Brendon Thomas and the Vibes	"Make It Rain"	13
Stevie Tonks	"Give Me Love"	14
Mae Valley	"Sparks Fly"	20
Mae Valley	"Landslide"	17
Beau Monga	"Gold Digger"	20

== Reception ==
- The first series enjoyed strong ratings with an average audience of 485,000, a significantly high audience number for TV3. The first series also had strong online engagement, with over 120,000 Facebook fans and up to 70,000 people actively discussing the show. Every episode trended on Twitter, with #xfactornz sometimes trending internationally. The show's site at tv3.co.nz has over 6.3 million page impressions, with over 886,000 streams of full episodes and over 844,000 streams of individual song performances. The grand final decider was watched by a cumulative audience of 1,326,000, with 553,976 votes cast to decide the winner. Overall 3,285,500 New Zealanders (79.7% of the population) watched the first series at one point.
- The second series was significantly down in ratings from the first. An average of 343,280 people watched the premiere of the second series whilst over 467,000 people tuned in to watch the premiere of the first series; this is a 26% drop in viewers, however by the end of the first week viewership had increased by 10%. On average over 1.3 million people watched the first week of the series. The Grand Final Decided was watched by an average audience of 359,910, down 39% from the Grand Final of the first series. Overall the second series had an average viewership of 328,000, down 18%.

=== Ratings ===
Series	Episodes	Premiere date	Premiere ratings	Rank	Live Grand Final Date	Finale ratings (Grand Finale)	Rank	Final Results Date	Finale ratings (Final Decider)	Rank	Series Average
1	28	21 April 2013	0.467	#4	21 July 2013	0.453	#2	22 July 2013	0.598	#3	0.403
2	30	15 February 2015	0.343	#5	17 May 2015	0.351	#4	18 May 2015	0.359	#6	0.328

=== Controversy and criticism ===
During the first live show of the second series, judges Natalia Kills and her husband Willy Moon verbally attacked and ridiculed a contestant, Joe Irvine, resulting in an audible backlash from the audience and fellow judge Melanie Blatt, who later described Kills as "a twat" on social media for her behaviour. The following day, MediaWorks received several complaints from viewers and the major sponsors of the show; McDonald's and 2degrees. It was later announced by the show's producers that both Kills and Moon had been immediately removed from the program. The results night aired with only Walker and Blatt in attendance at the judging panel.

== The Xtra Factor ==
The Xtra Factor is a television programme that was broadcast immediately after the live shows of the second New Zealand series of The X Factor, in the format of a "sports-style analysis show". It was filmed live in Vector Arena (where The X Factor was filmed), off to the side of the main stage, and presented by Guy, Sharyn & Clint's Guy Williams, Sharyn Casey, and Clint Roberts. When The X Factor ran overtime, Four broadcast the TV3 feed until it had finished. It aired on Four, sister channel of The X Factor's channel TV3, on Sunday and Monday, then repeats were aired on The Edge TV on Monday and Tuesday at 7 pm. It was a replacement of behind-the-scenes video blog Samsung Insider, which was part of the first series of The X Factor. The first episode aired on 15 March 2015, immediately preceding the first live show, and the final episode on 18 May 2015, immediately preceding the final results show. In the final episode, series winner Beau Monga was presented with his car as part of his prize. On 25 May 2015, the trio presented an hour long special entitled The X Factor All Access in The X Factor's previous Monday timeslot on TV3. It featured behind-the-scenes footage and the presenters' favourite moments of the second New Zealand series of The X Factor.
