= The X Factor (New Zealand TV series) series 2 =

The X Factor
- Series 2
- Hosted by: Dominic Bowden
- Judges: Melanie Blatt; Stan Walker; Natalie Bassingthwaighte (live shows); Shelton Woolright (live shows); Natalia Kills (auditions-judges’ houses and live shows week 1); Willy Moon (auditions-judges’ houses and live shows week 1)
- Winner: Beau Monga
- Winning mentor: Natalie Bassingthwaighte
- Runner-up: Nyssa Collins
- Finals venue: Vector Arena

Release
- Original network: TV3
- Original release: 15 February – 18 May 2015

Series chronology
- ← Previous; Series 1

The second and final series of the New Zealand television reality music competition The X Factor premiered on TV3 in February 2015. Pre-auditions began in October 2014. As well as again being open to singers aged 14 and over, the series was also open to bands, which had to contain no more than five members and have at least two singers. The contestants were split into the show's four traditional categories: Boys, Girls, Over 25s and Groups.

The series premiered on Sunday 15 February, and screened three nights per week (Sunday–Tuesday) until March 15, when it returned to the regular schedule of two nights per week (Sunday–Monday). As well as being broadcast on TV3, the full series was also streamed live on TV3's website. The live shows were simulcast on More FM.

The series was again hosted by Dominic Bowden. Both former All Saints singer Melanie Blatt and Australian Idol winner Stan Walker returned to judge the series. They were joined by new judges, married couple Natalia Kills and Willy Moon until the first live show when they were both fired after berating a contestant from the Over 25s, then former The X Factor Australia judge Natalie Bassingthwaighte and I Am Giant drummer Shelton Woolright from the second live show.

The series was accompanied by spin-off show The Xtra Factor, which was hosted by Guy Williams, Sharyn Casey, and Clint Roberts, and screened on Four immediately after The X Factor.

As of February 2016, five acts from series 2 have been signed to a certain music label. Beau Monga, Mae Valley, Brendon Thomas and The Vibes were signed to Sony Music New Zealand, Stevie Tonks was signed to Christian music label "Parachute" and Finlay Robertson had received a grant by NZ On Air to release a single titled "Control".

== Development ==
The X Factor was created by Simon Cowell in the United Kingdom and the New Zealand version is based on the original UK series. Broadcast funding agency NZ On Air contributed $800,000 as a minority investor, for the production of 41 episodes of 60 minutes duration each.

The series' broadcast sponsor is McDonald's, with Mazda, Fruttare, 2degrees and VO5 as programme partners.

The initial pre-audition tour of 13 towns and cities was held in October and early November 2014, with the judges' auditions round filmed in Auckland in late November and early December. The Boot Camp round was filmed in mid-January 2015 in Auckland.

== Judges and host ==
Series 2 judges (seat order)

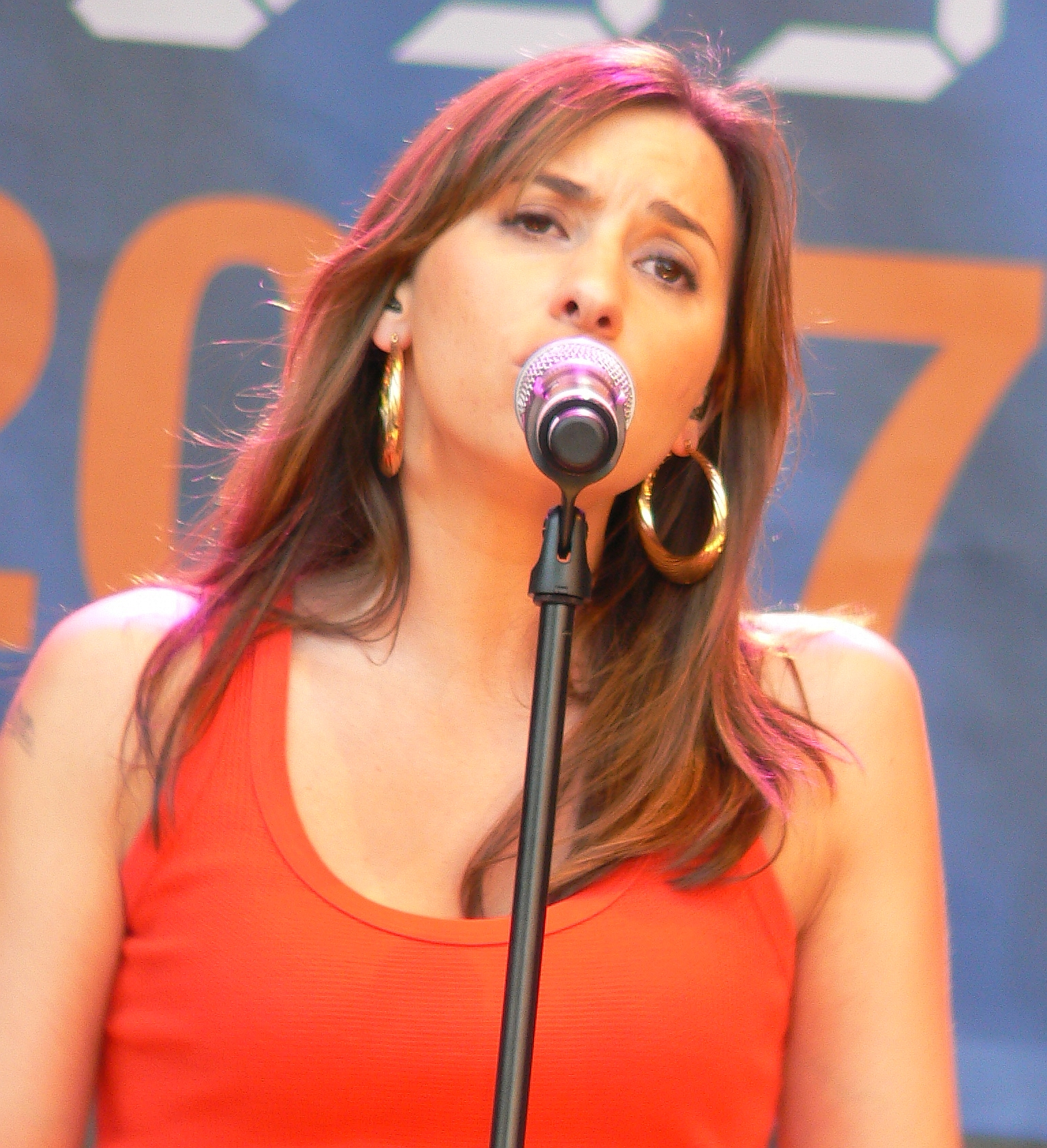
Melanie Blatt

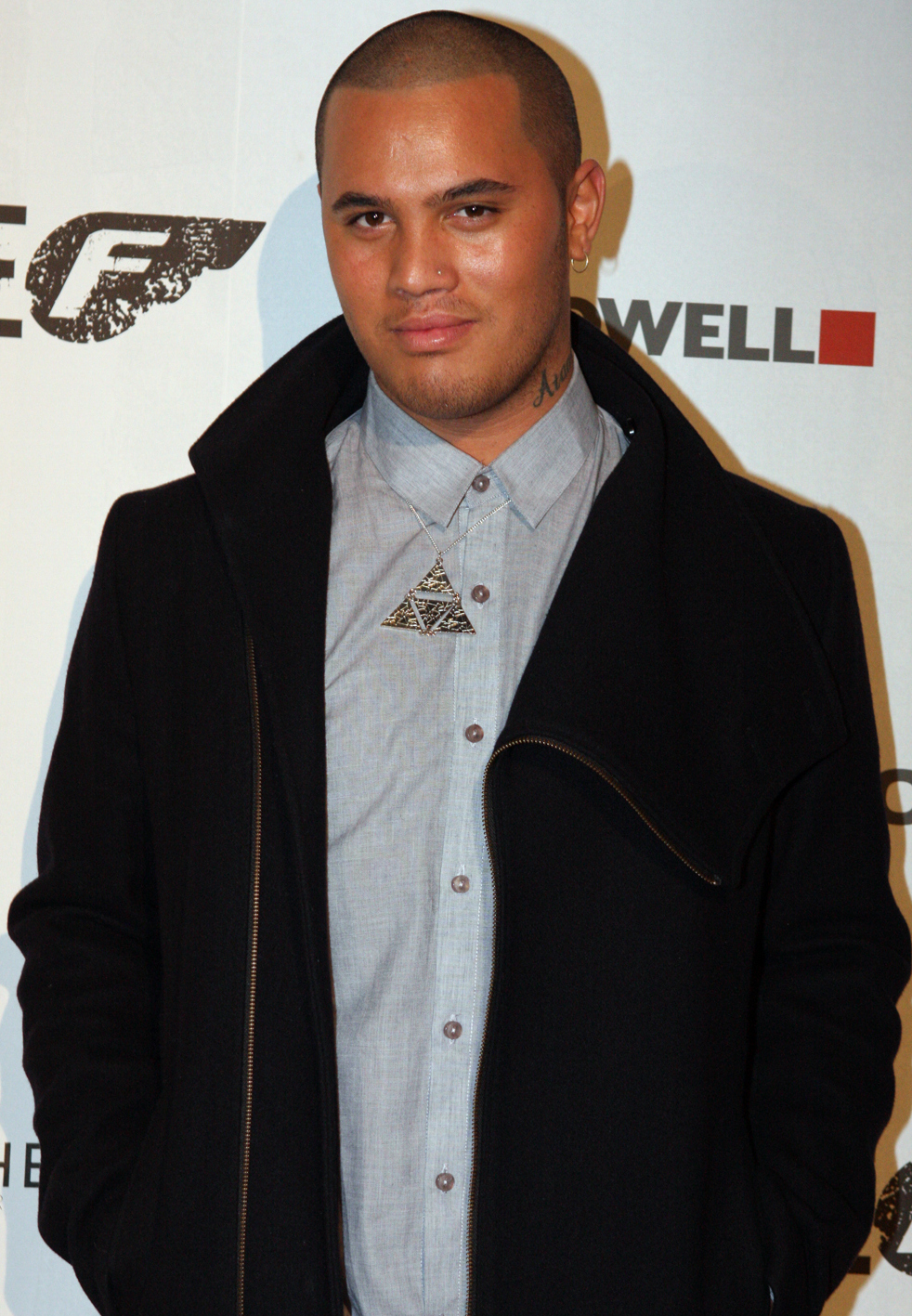
Stan Walker

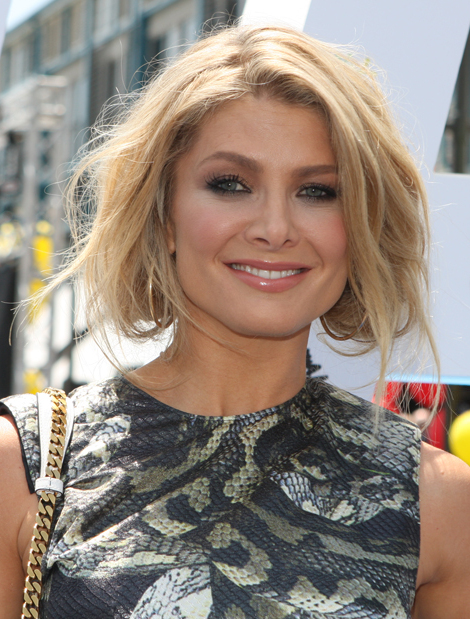
Natalie Bassingthwaighte

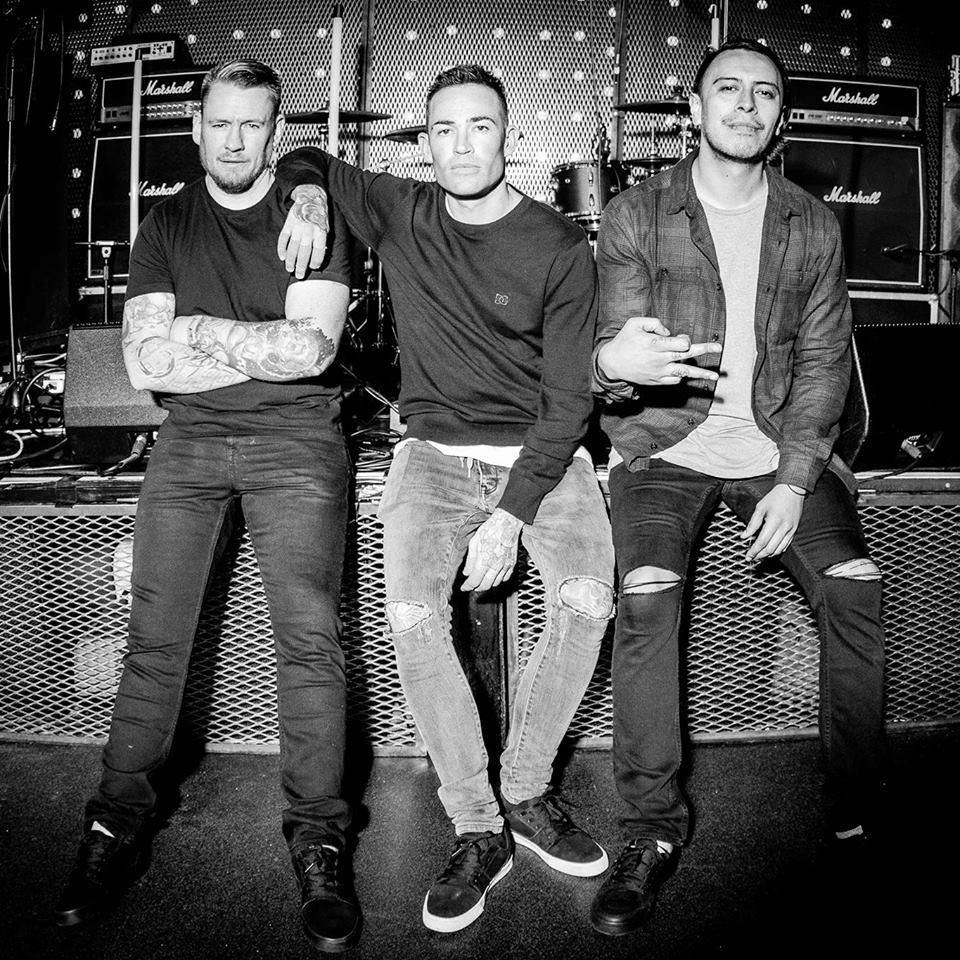
Shelton Woolright

In September, two of the judges from the first series, Melanie Blatt and Stan Walker, were confirmed to return as judges. The other two judges from the first series, Ruby Frost and Daniel Bedingfield, were confirmed as not returning for the second series, with Frost wanting to focus on her music career. In October the final two judges were confirmed as English singer Natalia Kills and her husband New Zealand-born singer Willy Moon. On 16 March 2015, only hours before the second live results show, Kills and Moon were sacked from the show after a public backlash ensued against the couple after they berated a contestant's appearance on air during the first live show the previous night (15 March). More than 50,000 people signed a petition to get the couple sacked. For the show on 16 March, there were only two judges on the panel. The X Factor Australia judge Natalie Bassingthwaighte and New Zealand-born I Am Giant drummer Shelton Woolright were named as the replacements of Moon and Kills respectively.

In August 2014, Dominic Bowden was confirmed to return as the host of the second series.

== Selection process ==
=== Pre-auditions ===
The first appeal for applicants was made on 24 August 2014, with the announcement of the application process and pre-audition tour details. Pre-auditions in front of the show's producers began on 11 October 2014 and travelled through 13 locations around New Zealand. This was a reduction from the 27 locations visited for the first series, with the second series focusing mainly on cities. Bands were also able to pre-audition in Auckland, Wellington and Christchurch or by uploading a performance video.

Cities where the pre-auditions were held.

Audition city/town	Dates	Venue
Auckland Central	11–12 October 2014	AUT City Campus
Queenstown	14 October 2014	Performing Arts Centre
Dunedin	15 October 2014	Forsyth Barr Stadium
Christchurch	16–17 October 2014	New Zealand Institute of Sport
Nelson	19 October 2014	Nelson College
Wellington	21–22 October 2014	Westpac Stadium
Palmerston North	24 October 2014	Regent Theatre
Napier	26 October 2014	Napier Boys' High School
Rotorua	27 October 2014	Rotorua Arts Village
Tauranga/Mt Maunganui	28 October 2014	Club Mount
Hamilton	29 October 2014	Wintec
Whangārei	30 October 2014	Whangarei Athletics Club
South Auckland	1–2 November 2014	Alfriston College

=== Judges' auditions ===
The auditionees chosen by the producers were invited back to the last set of auditions that took place in front of the judges and a live studio audience. These auditions were filmed at SkyCity Theatre in Auckland from 26 November to 2 December 2014 and broadcast from 15 February. The successful contestants then progressed to the Boot Camp round.

Notable returning auditionees included three contestants who had competed in the first series: Finlay Robertson, who made it to judges' retreats; Hannah Cosgrove, who reached the second day of Boot Camp; and Kalsey Goodall and Nofo Lameko, who also made it to Boot Camp. Stuss featured as Cassie Henderson's backing band in week eight of the first series' live shows. Steve Broad previously appeared on the second series of NZ Idol in 2005, where he placed third, and on Pop's Ultimate Star in 2007. Archie Hill and Rick Aslett were two separate acts that appeared on series three of New Zealand's Got Talent (series 3) at the audition stage in 2013. Richard Aslett also went on to appear live as one of the "crowd favourites" at the finale of series 3 of NZGT in December 2013.

- Auditions 1 (15 February): Featured successful auditionees: Shayla Armstrong, Jazzy Axton, Brendon Thomas and the Vibes, Joe Irvine, Ralph Zambrano, Nofo Lameko, Beau Monga, Ellaphon Tauariki and Eb Skye.
- Auditions 2 (16 February) Featured successful auditionees: Michelle Beck, Liam Fitzsimon Cooper, Finlay Robertson, Matt Sainsbury, Tux Severne, Sarah Spicer and Stevie Tonks.
- Auditions 3 (17 February): Featured successful auditionees: Co-lab, Hannah Cosgrove, Dr3am, Fare Thee Well, Stuss and Urban Legacy.
- Auditions 4 (22 February): Featured successful auditionees: Yolanda Bartram, Steve Broad, Teea Cecil, Nyssa Collins, Malakai Funaki, Archie Hill, Ria Hoeta, The Kicks, Mansweat, Anthony O'Hagan, Julie Rogers and Reiki Ruawai.
- Auditions 5 (23 February): Featured successful auditionees: Ashy Batchelor, Lili Bayliss, Georgia Bishop, Abby Cristodoulou, Bethan Dunstone-Leith, Elae, Elijah and Leilani, Joseph Emanuel, Georgina Banfield, Hiki and Kerin, Llewellyn, Looking For Alaska, Kayla Mahon and Modulation.
- Auditions 6 (24 February): Featured successful auditionees: Emma Amiri-Ghaemmaghamy, Talitha Blake, Shae Brider, Alfonso Fabras, Sally Faherty, Irene Folau, Kalsey Goodall, Micah Heath, Matthew Herd, Liam Jolly, Lydia Lewis, Johnny Searle and Izaia Tilialo.

=== Boot Camp ===
The Boot Camp round was filmed at Vector Arena in Auckland in mid-January 2015 and broadcast from 1 to 3 March. In the first part of Boot Camp, the 101 acts were divided into groups of eight and giving a song to sing. From here they were reduced down to a top 64 and were introduced to their category judge. In the six-seat challenge, the 12 acts in each category performed one song each for the judges and were allocated a seat or sent home. If all seats were filled, a swap had to take place with a previously seated contestant. Any contestant under 16 could not be swapped out if they were given a seat.

The 24 successful acts were:

- Boys: Micah Heath, Archie Hill, Nofo Lameko, Beau Monga, Reiki Ruawai, Stevie Tonks
- Girls: Jazzy Axton, Georgina Banfield, Lili Bayliss, Nyssa Collins, Sally Faherty, Finlay Robertson
- Over 25s: Talitha Blake, Steve Broad, Joseph Emanuel, Joe Irvine, Kayla Mahon, Sarah Spicer
- Groups: Brendon Thomas & the Vibes, Duel, Fare Thee Well, Modulation, Stuss, Urban Legacy

=== Judges' retreats ===
The judges' retreats episodes were filmed over the month of February in locations in New Zealand and Thailand. Blatt mentored the Over 25s in Pattaya, Thailand, assisted by Nicole Appleton; Kills took the boys to Titirangi, assisted by contestant of the first series of The X Factor Benny Tipene; Moon has the Groups in Karaka, with musician and former New Zealand's Got Talent judge Jason Kerrison; and Walker took the girls to Bangkok, assisted by Ginny Blackmore. Moon created a new group, country duo Mae Valley, made up of Abby Christodoulou and Hannah Cosgrove who had previously been eliminated at Boot Camp.

At the end of judges' retreats, it was announced that each judge could bring one further act back as a wildcard, with the public voting for which of the four wildcards would become the 13th act.

Key:

– Wildcard Winner

Summary of judges' retreats
Judge	Category	Location	Assistant	Acts eliminated	Wildcard
Blatt	Over 25s	Pattaya	Nicole Appleton	Talitha Blake, Kayla Mahon	Joseph Emanuel
Kills	Boys	Titirangi	Benny Tipene	Micah Heath, Reiki Ruawai	Archie Hill
Moon	Groups	Karaka	Jason Kerrison	Duel, Modulation, Urban Legacy	Mae Valley
Walker	Girls	Bangkok	Ginny Blackmore	Georgina Banfield, Sally Faherty	Jazzy Axton

== Acts ==
Key:

– Winner
– Runner-Up
– Third Place

Category (Mentor)	Acts			
Boys (Bassingthwaighte)*	Nofo Lameko	Beau Monga	Stevie Tonks	
Girls (Walker)	Lili Bayliss	Nyssa Collins	Finlay Robertson	
Over 25s (Blatt)	Steve Broad	Joe Irvine	Sarah Spicer	
Groups (Woolright)*	Brendon Thomas and The Vibes	Fare Thee Well	Mae Valley	Stuss

- The Boys category was originally mentored by Natalia Kills, while the Groups category was originally mentored by Willy Moon.

== Live shows ==
The live shows began on 15 March 2015. The shows were filmed at The X Factor NZ Studio in Favona, Auckland. The finals were held in Vector Arena, in Auckland.

=== Results summary ===
Colour key
– Act in the bottom two/three and had to perform in the final showdown
– Act was in the bottom three but received the fewest votes and was immediately eliminated
– Act received the lowest number of public votes and was immediately eliminated (no final showdown)

Weekly results per act
Act	Week 1	Week 2	Week 3	Week 4	Week 5	Week 6	Week 7	Quarter-Final	Semi-Final	Final	
Act	Week 1	Week 2	Week 3	Week 4	Week 5	Week 6	Week 7	Quarter-Final	Semi-Final	First Monday Vote	Second Monday Vote
Beau Monga	3rd	4th	3rd	2nd	2nd	1st	1st	1st	1st	1st	Winner (Final)
Nyssa Collins	7th	6th	5th	4th	7th	4th	3rd	2nd	2nd	2nd	Runner-Up (Final)
Brendon Thomas and The Vibes	8th	5th	7th	9th	3rd	2nd	2nd	3rd	4th	3rd	Eliminated (Final)
Stevie Tonks	2nd	1st	4th	1st	1st	3rd	5th	5th	3rd	Eliminated (Semi-Final)	
Steve Broad	6th	3rd	1st	3rd	4th	5th	4th	4th	Eliminated (Quarter-Final)		
Lili Bayliss	12th	9th	10th	5th	6th	7th	6th	Eliminated (Week 7)			
Mae Valley	5th	8th	6th	7th	5th	6th	Eliminated (Week 6)				
Joe Irvine	1st	7th	9th	8th	8th	Eliminated (Week 5)					
Finlay Robertson	4th	2nd	3rd	6th	9th	Eliminated (Week 5)					
Sarah Spicer	9th	10th	8th	10th	Eliminated (Week 4)						
Fare Thee Well	10th	12th	11th	Eliminated (Week 3)							
Nofo Lameko	11th	11th	Eliminated (Week 2)								
Stuss	13th	Eliminated (Week 1)									
Final Showdown	Bayliss, Stuss	Fare Thee Well, Lameko	Bayliss, Fare Thee Well	Brendon Thomas and The Vibes, Spicer	Collins, Irvine	Bayliss, Mae Valley	Bayliss, Tonks	Broad, Tonks	Brendon Thomas and The Vibes, Tonks	No final showdown/judges' vote; results were based on public votes alone	
Woolright's vote to eliminate	—N/a	Lameko	Bayliss	Spicer	Irvine	Bayliss	Bayliss	Broad	Tonks	No final showdown/judges' vote; results were based on public votes alone	
Bassingthwaite's vote to eliminate	—N/a	Fare Thee Well	Fare Thee Well	Spicer	Irvine	Mae Valley	Bayliss	Broad	Brendon Thomas and The Vibes	No final showdown/judges' vote; results were based on public votes alone	
Walker's vote to eliminate	Stuss	Lameko	Fare Thee Well	Brendon Thomas and The Vibes	Irvine	Mae Valley	Tonks	Broad	Tonks	No final showdown/judges' vote; results were based on public votes alone	
Blatt's vote to eliminate	Bayliss	Lameko	Fare Thee Well	Brendon Thomas and The Vibes	Collins	Mae Valley	Bayliss	Tonks	Tonks	No final showdown/judges' vote; results were based on public votes alone	
Eliminated	Stuss; 1 of 2 votes Deadlock	Nofo Lameko; 3 of 4 votes Majority	Fare Thee Well; 3 of 4 votes Majority	Sarah Spicer; 2 of 4 votes Deadlock	Finlay Robertson; Public Vote To Save	Mae Valley; 3 of 4 votes Majority	Lili Bayliss; 3 of 4 votes Majority	Steve Broad; 3 of 4 votes Majority	Stevie Tonks; 3 of 4 votes Majority	Brendon Thomas and The Vibes; Third Place	Nyssa Collins; Runner-Up
Eliminated	Stuss; 1 of 2 votes Deadlock	Nofo Lameko; 3 of 4 votes Majority	Fare Thee Well; 3 of 4 votes Majority	Sarah Spicer; 2 of 4 votes Deadlock	Joe Irvine; 3 of 4 votes Majority	Mae Valley; 3 of 4 votes Majority	Lili Bayliss; 3 of 4 votes Majority	Steve Broad; 3 of 4 votes Majority	Stevie Tonks; 3 of 4 votes Majority	Brendon Thomas and The Vibes; Third Place	Nyssa Collins; Runner-Up

=== Live show details ===
==== Week 1 (15/16 March) ====
- Theme: Judges' choice
- Musical guests: Savage & Timmy Trumpet ("Freaks"), Jackie Thomas ("Until the Last Goodbye")

Acts' performances on the first live show
Act	Category (Mentor)	Order	Song	Result
Nyssa Collins	Girls (Walker)	1	"I Shot the Sheriff"/"Uptown Funk"	Safe
Beau Monga	Boys (Kills)	2	"Make It Bun Dem"/"Jamming"	Safe
Fare Thee Well	Groups (Moon)	3	"The Sound of Silence"	Safe
Sarah Spicer	Over 25s (Blatt)	4	"Wrecking Ball"	Safe
Stuss	Groups (Moon)	5	"Girls"	Bottom Two
Nofo Lameko	Boys (Kills)	6	"Cry Me a River"	Safe
Lili Bayliss	Girls (Walker)	7	"Rude"	Bottom Two
Brendon Thomas and the Vibes	Groups (Moon)	8	"Lonely Boy"	Safe
Stevie Tonks	Boys (Kills)	9	"Young and Beautiful"	Safe
Mae Valley	Groups (Moon)	10	"If I Die Young"	Safe
Steve Broad	Over 25s (Blatt)	11	"Drunk in Love"	Safe
Finlay Robertson	Girls (Walker)	12	"Chandelier"	Safe
Joe Irvine	Over 25s (Blatt)	13	"Cry Me a River"	Safe
Final showdown details
Act	Category (mentor)	Order	Song	Result
Stuss	Groups (Moon)	1	"Shiver"	Eliminated
Lili Bayliss	Girls (Walker)	2	"No Scrubs"	Safe

Judges' vote to eliminate

- Walker: Stuss – backed his own act, Lili Bayliss.
- Blatt: Lili Bayliss – sent the result to deadlock to be fair to Stuss, who had no mentor backing them at the time.

With the acts in the bottom two receiving one vote each, the result went to deadlock and reverted to the earlier public vote. Stuss was eliminated as the act with the fewest public votes.

Notes

- Kills and Moon appeared on Sunday's live show but were fired with immediate effect after bullying Joe Irvine. Monday's show went ahead with only Blatt and Walker appearing on the panel with Walker looking after Kills's Boys and Blatt looking after Moon's Groups.
- Studio versions of the contestants' performances were released on iTunes starting this week. A series first.
- On 23 March 2015, the performances of three acts entered the NZ Singles Chart. Stevie Tonk's performance of "Young and Beautiful" debuted at number 5, Mae Valley's performance of "If I Die Young" debuted at number 10, and Lili Bayliss' performance of "Rude" debuted at number 18.

==== Week 2 (22/23 March) ====
- Theme: Biggest records right now
- Musical guests: Ginny Blackmore ("Love Me Anyway"), Jamie McDell ("Back Of My Mind")

Acts' performances on the second live show
Act	Category (Mentor)	Order	Song	Result
Finlay Robertson	Girls (Walker)	1	"FourFiveSeconds"	Safe
Stevie Tonks	Boys (Bassingthwaighte)	2	"Like I Can"	Safe
Sarah Spicer	Over 25s (Blatt)	3	"Love Me like You Do"	Safe
Fare Thee Well	Groups (Woolright)	4	"Style"	Bottom Two
Joe Irvine	Over 25s (Blatt)	5	"Take Me to Church"	Safe
Nofo Lameko	Boys (Bassingthwaighte)	6	"Special"	Bottom Two
Nyssa Collins	Girls (Walker)	7	"Dear Future Husband"/"All About That Bass"	Safe
Beau Monga	Boys (Bassingthwaighte)	8	"Happy"/"Drop It Like It's Hot"/"Beat It"	Safe
Mae Valley	Groups (Woolright)	9	"Up"	Safe
Steve Broad	Over 25s (Blatt)	10	"Jealous"	Safe
Brendon Thomas and the Vibes	Groups (Woolright)	11	"Budapest"	Safe
Lili Bayliss	Girls (Walker)	12	"Earned It"	Safe
Final showdown details
Act	Category (Mentor)	Order	Song	Result
Fare Thee Well	Groups (Woolright)	1	"If I Ain't Got You"	Safe
Nofo Lameko	Boys (Bassingthwaighte)	2	"Valerie"	Eliminated

Judges' vote to eliminate

- Woolright: Nofo Lameko – backed his own act, Fare Thee Well.
- Bassingthwaighte: Fare Thee Well – backed her own act, Nofo Lameko.
- Blatt: Nofo Lameko – had never felt a connection with Lameko.
- Walker: Nofo Lameko – based on what he saw in the future for the performers.

However, voting statistics revealed that Lameko received more votes than Fare Thee Well, which meant that if Walker sent the result to deadlock, Fare Thee Well would have been eliminated.

Notes

- On 30 March 2015, Brendon Thomas and the Vibes' performance of "Budapest" debuted at number 12 on the NZ Singles Chart. Their performance of "Budapest" retained its spot at number 12 for a second week.

==== Week 3 (30/31 March) ====
- Theme: Songs of summer
- Musical guests: Jason Kerrison ("You Want Me As Me"), Ricky Martin ("Mr. Put It Down")

Acts' performances on the third live show
Act	Category (Mentor)	Order	Song	Result
Fare Thee Well	Groups (Woolright)	1	"In the Summertime"	Bottom Two
Joe Irvine	Over 25s (Blatt)	2	"Summer of '69"	Safe
Beau Monga	Boys (Bassingthwaighte)	3	"Señorita"	Safe
Lili Bayliss	Girls (Walker)	4	"Only Girl (In the World)"	Bottom Two
Mae Valley	Groups (Woolright)	5	"Somewhere in My Car"	Safe
Steve Broad	Over 25s (Blatt)	6	"Summertime Sadness"	Safe
Finlay Robertson	Girls (Walker)	7	"Bang Bang"	Safe
Stevie Tonks	Boys (Bassingthwaighte)	8	"Are You Gonna Be My Girl"	Safe
Nyssa Collins	Girls (Walker)	9	"How Will I Know"	Safe
Brendon Thomas and The Vibes	Groups (Woolright)	10	"I'm Shakin'"	Safe
Sarah Spicer	Over 25s (Blatt)	11	"Summertime"	Safe
Final showdown details
Act	Category (Mentor)	Order	Song	Result
Fare Thee Well	Groups (Woolright)	1	"Hallelujah"	Eliminated
Lili Bayliss	Girls (Walker)	2	"Naughty Girl"	Safe

Judges' vote to eliminate

- Walker: Fare Thee Well – backed his own act, Lili Bayliss.
- Woolright: Lili Bayliss – backed his own act, Fare Thee Well.
- Bassingthwaighte: Fare Thee Well – gave no reason.
- Blatt: Fare Thee Well – thought Bayliss could hold a more sustainable career in the music industry.

Notes

- This week's shows were moved to Monday and Tuesday nights to avoid the Sunday night show clashing with the final of the 2015 Cricket World Cup.
- On 3 April 2015, Nyssa Collins performance of "How Will I Know" debuted at number 19 on the NZ Singles Chart.

==== Week 4 (6/7 April) ====
- Theme: One-hit wonders
- Musical guests: Vince Harder ("Shot Me Down"), P-Money & Sid Diamond ("Truth Hurts")

Acts' performances on the fourth live show
Act	Category (Mentor)	Order	Song	Result
Sarah Spicer	Over 25s (Blatt)	1	"What's Up?"	Bottom Two
Nyssa Collins	Girls (Walker)	2	"A Thousand Miles"	Safe
Brendon Thomas and The Vibes	Groups (Woolright)	3	"My Sharona"	Bottom Two
Finlay Robertson	Girls (Walker)	4	"Somebody That I Used to Know"	Safe
Joe Irvine	Over 25s (Blatt)	5	"(I've Had) The Time of My Life"	Safe
Stevie Tonks	Boys (Bassingthwaighte)	6	"Crazy"	Safe
Mae Valley	Groups (Woolright)	7	"Teenage Dirtbag"	Safe
Lili Bayliss	Girls (Walker)	8	"Tainted Love"/"Sweet Dreams (Are Made of This)"	Safe
Steve Broad	Over 25s (Blatt)	9	"Stay"	Safe
Beau Monga	Boys (Bassingthwaighte)	10	"Freestyler"	Safe
Final showdown details
Act	Category (mentor)	Order	Song	Result
Sarah Spicer	Over 25s (Blatt)	1	"At Last"	Eliminated
Brendon Thomas and The Vibes	Groups (Woolright)	2	"Power of Soul"	Safe

Judges' vote to eliminate

- Woolright: Sarah Spicer – backed his own act, Brendon Thomas and The Vibes.
- Blatt: Brendon Thomas and The Vibes – backed her own act, Sarah Spicer.
- Bassingthwaighte: Sarah Spicer – based her decision on who could sell more records.
- Walker: Brendon Thomas and The Vibes – could not decide and sent the result to deadlock.

With the acts in the bottom two receiving two votes each, the result went to deadlock and reverted to the earlier public vote. Sarah Spicer was eliminated as the act with the fewest public votes.

Notes

- On 13 April 2015, the performances of two acts entered the NZ Singles Chart. Stevie Tonk's performance of "Crazy" debuted at number 5 and Lili Bayliss' performance of "Tainted Love / Sweet Dreams (Are Made of This)" debuted at number 14. Tonks' performance of "Crazy" managed to stay on the charts for a second week but dropped to number 18.

==== Week 5 (12/13 April) ====
- Theme: Ed Sheeran vs. Taylor Swift
- Musical guest: Ed Sheeran ("Thinking Out Loud", "Bloodstream")
- Two acts were eliminated on the fifth live show. One is the act with the lowest number of public votes and the other act is decided by the judges in the final showdown.

Acts' performances on the fifth live show
Act	Category (Mentor)	Order	Song	Result
Finlay Robertson	Girls (Walker)	1	"Shake It Off"	Eliminated
Joe Irvine	Over 25s (Blatt)	2	"Lego House"	Bottom Three
Beau Monga	Boys (Bassingthwaighte)	3	"I Knew You Were Trouble"	Safe
Lili Bayliss	Girls (Walker)	4	"The A Team"	Safe
Steve Broad	Over 25s (Blatt)	5	"Blank Space"	Safe
Mae Valley	Groups (Woolright)	6	"Sparks Fly"	Safe
Nyssa Collins	Girls (Walker)	7	"Safe & Sound"	Bottom Three
Stevie Tonks	Boys (Bassingthwaighte)	8	"Give Me Love"	Safe
Brendon Thomas and The Vibes	Groups (Woolright)	9	"Make It Rain"	Safe
Final showdown details
Act	Category (mentor)	Order	Song	Result
Nyssa Collins	Girls (Walker)	1	"Slow Motion"	Safe
Joe Irvine	Over 25s (Blatt)	2	"Wake Me Up"	Eliminated

Judges' vote to eliminate

- Blatt: Nyssa Collins - backed her own act, Joe Irvine
- Walker: Joe Irvine - backed his own act, Nyssa Collins
- Woolright: Joe Irvine - based on their ability to sell records.
- Bassingthwaighte: Joe Irvine - gave no reason.

Notes

- For a series first a charity single consisting of the Top 12 was created to raise money for Ronald McDonald House. The single was a cover version of Rachel Platten's "Fight Song". All money raised towards buying the single would go to Ronald McDonald House. The single's music video debuted on The Xtra Factor and was later released on iTunes which debuted at #2 soon climbing to #1
- After her elimination on The X Factor, Finlay announced on The Xtra Factor that her save me song would have been "Tragedy" by Christina Perri. She later sang a line of the song on the show.
- On 17 April 2015, the performances of three acts entered the NZ Singles Chart. Brendon Thomas and The Vibes' performance of "Make It Rain" debuted at number 13, Stevie Tonk's performance of "Give Me Love" debuted at number 14 and Mae Valley's performance of "Sparks Fly" debuted at number 20.

==== Week 6 (19/20 April) ====
- Theme: Celebrities' choice
- Musical guest: Stan Walker (Medley from the album Truth & Soul)
- Group performance (Top 13): "Fight Song"

Acts' performances on the sixth live show
Act	Category (Mentor)	Order	Song	Chosen by	Result
Mae Valley	Groups (Woolright)	1	"Landslide"	Israel Dagg	Bottom Two
Stevie Tonks	Boys (Bassingthwaighte)	2	"Hold Back the River"	Jay-Jay Harvey	Safe
Nyssa Collins	Girls (Walker)	3	"Superstition"	Awen Guttenbeil	Safe
Steve Broad	Over 25s (Blatt)	4	"Ghost"	Kylie Bax	Safe
Lili Bayliss	Girls (Walker)	5	"That's Not My Name"	Dominic Harvey	Bottom Two
Brendon Thomas and The Vibes	Groups (Woolright)	6	"Little Monster"	Jono and Ben	Safe
Beau Monga	Boys (Bassingthwaighte)	7	"Gold Digger"	DJ Sir-Vere	Safe
Final showdown details
Act	Category (Mentor)	Order	Song		Result
Mae Valley	Groups (Woolright)	1	"Lay Me Down"		Eliminated
Lili Bayliss	Girls (Walker)	2	"You're The One That I Want"		Safe

Judges' vote to eliminate

- Walker: Mae Valley - backed his own act, Lili Bayliss.
- Woolright: Lili Bayliss - backed his own act, Mae Valley.
- Blatt: Mae Valley - based on their ability to sell records.
- Bassingthwaighte: Mae Valley - gave no reason.

However, voting statistics revealed that Mae Valley received more votes than Bayliss, which meant that if Bassingthwaighte send the result to deadlock, Bayliss would have been eliminated.

Notes

- This week's song choices were individually chosen for each act by a New Zealand celebrity.
- On 24 April 2015, the performances of two acts entered the NZ Singles Chart. Mae Valley's performance of "Landslide" debuted at number 17 and Beau Monga's performance of "Gold Digger" debuted at number 20.

==== Week 7 (26/27 April) ====
- Theme: Musical heroes
- Musical guests: Gin Wigmore ("New Rush"), Avalanche City ("Inside Out")

Acts' performances on the seventh live show
Act	Category (Mentor)	Order	Song	Musical Hero	Result
Stevie Tonks	Boys (Bassingthwaighte)	1	"Billie Jean"	Michael Jackson	Bottom Two
Lili Bayliss	Girls (Walker)	2	"Back to Black"/"Bang Bang (My Baby Shot Me Down)"	Amy Winehouse	Bottom Two
Beau Monga	Boys (Bassingthwaighte)	3	"Goody Goody"	Frankie Lymon	Safe
Brendon Thomas and The Vibes	Groups (Woolright)	4	"Higher Ground"	Stevie Wonder	Safe
Nyssa Collins	Girls (Walker)	5	"Empire State of Mind (Part II) Broken Down"	Alicia Keys	Safe
Steve Broad	Over 25s (Blatt)	6	"Climax"	Usher	Safe
Final showdown details
Act	Category (mentor)	Order	Song		Result
Lili Bayliss	Girls (Walker)	1	"Blue Jeans"		Eliminated
Stevie Tonks	Boys (Bassingthwaighte)	2	"Grenade"		Safe

Judges' vote to eliminate

- Bassingthwaighte: Lili Bayliss - backed her own act, Stevie Tonks.
- Walker: Stevie Tonks - backed his own act, Lili Bayliss.
- Woolright: Lili Bayliss - thought that Tonks had the better voice.
- Blatt: Lili Bayliss - stated that this was Bayliss' fourth time in the bottom two.

Notes

- No songs from this week's performances appeared on New Zealand music charts.

==== Week 8: Quarter-Final (3/4 May) ====
- Theme: Kiwi artists
- Musical guests: Tori Kelly ("Nobody Love"), The Script ("Paint the Town Green")

Acts' performances in the quarter-final
Act	Category (Mentor)	Order	Song	Mentored By	Result
Nyssa Collins	Girls (Walker)	1	"Wake Up"	Aaradhna	Safe
Steve Broad	Over 25s (Blatt)	2	"Always on My Mind"	Tiki Taane	Bottom Two
Brendon Thomas and The Vibes	Groups (Woolright)	3	"Bathe in the River"	Hollie Smith	Safe
Stevie Tonks	Boys (Bassingthwaighte)	4	"Oh My"	Gin Wigmore	Bottom Two
Beau Monga	Boys (Bassingthwaighte)	5	"Fade Away"	Che Fu	Safe
Final showdown details
Act	Category (Mentor)	Order	Song		Result
Stevie Tonks	Boys (Bassingthwaighte)	1	"I Can't Make You Love Me"		Safe
Steve Broad	Over 25s (Blatt)	2	"I Lived"		Eliminated

Judges' vote to eliminate

- Bassingthwaighte: Steve Broad - backed her own act, Stevie Tonks.
- Blatt: Stevie Tonks - backed her own act, Steve Broad.
- Woolright: Steve Broad - felt Tonks would have a successful career in the music industry.
- Walker: Steve Broad - felt Tonks deserved to be in the competition longer.

However, voting statistics revealed that Broad received more votes than Tonks, which meant that if Walker sent the result to deadlock, Broad would have advanced to the semi-final and Tonks would have been eliminated.

Notes

- The remaining five acts were solely mentored by their given celebrity and then performed a song by that particular artist.
- With the elimination of Steve Broad, Melanie Blatt has no more acts left.
- No songs from this week's performances appeared on New Zealand music charts.

==== Week 9: Semi-Final (10/11 May) ====
- Themes: Number ones, Songs for Mum
- Musical guests: Spandau Ballet ("Gold"), Benny Tipene ("Lanterns")

Acts' performances in the semi-final
Act	Category (Mentor)	Order	Number One Song	Order	Song For Mum	Result
Brendon Thomas and The Vibes	Groups (Woolright)	1	"Another Brick In the Wall"	7	"Imagine"/"You Can't Always Get What You Want"	Bottom Two
Beau Monga	Boys (Bassingthwaighte)	2	"My Love"/"La La La"	5	"Silly Love Songs"	Safe
Stevie Tonks	Boys (Bassingthwaighte)	3	"Some Nights"	8	"Fix You"	Bottom Two
Nyssa Collins	Girls (Walker)	4	"Am I Wrong"/"Yeah 3x"	6	"Crazy"	Safe
Final showdown details
Act	Category (Mentor)	Order	Song			Result
Stevie Tonks	Boys (Bassingthwaighte)	1	"Over the Rainbow"			Eliminated
Brendon Thomas and The Vibes	Groups (Woolright)	2	"My Generation"			Safe

Judges' vote to eliminate

- Woolright: Stevie Tonks – gave no reason, but effectively backed his own act, Brendon Thomas and The Vibes.
- Bassingthwaighte: Brendon Thomas and The Vibes – gave no reason, but effectively backed her own act, Stevie Tonks.
- Walker: Stevie Tonks – based on the final showdown performances.
- Blatt: Stevie Tonks – based on the final showdown performances.

However, voting statistics revealed that Tonks received more votes than Brendan Thomas and The Vibes, which meant that if Blatt sent the result to deadlock, Tonks would have advanced to the final and Brendan Thomas and The Vibes would have been eliminated.

Notes

- For the first time this series, each act performed two songs.
- This was the final week where a final showdown decided who would go home for this series.
- The competing acts of the sixth series of the New Zealand version of Dancing With the Stars were announced during ninth results show.
- No songs from this week's performances appeared on New Zealand music charts.

==== Week 10: Final (17/18 May) ====
===== 17 May =====
- Themes: Party songs, Judges' choice
- Musical guest: I Am Giant ("Kiss From A Ghost")

Acts' performances on the Sunday Final
Act	Category (Mentor)	Order	Party songs	Order	Judges' choice
Brendon Thomas and The Vibes	Groups (Woolright)	1	"Are You Gonna Go My Way"	5	"(Sitting On) The Dock of the Bay"
Nyssa Collins	Girls (Walker)	2	"Everybody (Backstreet's Back)"/"Thriller"	6	"Don't Dream It's Over"
Beau Monga	Boys (Bassingthwaighte)	3	"Insane in the Brain"	4	"The Roimata Song"

===== 18 May =====
- Themes: Audition song, Winner's single
- Group Performance: "I'm Not the Only One"/"I Need A Dollar"
- Musical guests: Stan Walker and Natalie Bassingthwaighte ("Signed, Sealed, Delivered (I'm Yours)")

Acts' performances on the Monday Final
Act	Category (Mentor)	Order	Audition Song	Order	Winner's Single	Result
Beau Monga	Boys (Bassingthwaighte)	1	"Hit the Road Jack"/"Fever"/"Feeling Good"	4	"King and Queen"	Winner
Nyssa Collins	Girls (Walker)	2	"Saving All My Love For You"	5	"18"	Runner-Up
Brendon Thomas and The Vibes	Groups (Woolright)	3	"Foxy Lady"	N/A	N/A (already eliminated)	Eliminated

Notes

- On 22 May 2015, the performances of two acts entered the NZ Singles Chart. Beau Monga's performance of "The Roimata Song" debuted at number 7 and Nyssa Collins' performance of "Don't Dream It's Over" debuted at number 8.

== Charity single ==
In April it was announced that the finalists had recorded a charity single, a cover of Rachel Platten's single "Fight Song". The charity single was released on 13 April is in aid of Ronald McDonald House Charities in New Zealand. The single debuted at number 13 on the Official New Zealand Singles Chart. The final 13 acts performed the song live on the week six results show.

== Reception ==
=== Critique and controversies ===
==== Producer interference ====
In December 2014, vlogger Brad Fisher claimed that during a taping of the judges' auditions, he saw the show's producer giving the judges hand signals to guide them on which contestants to put through to Boot Camp. However, judge Stan Walker denied the claims, saying that while the producers give the judges background information on the contestants, it was up to the judges to choose who goes through.

==== Natalia Kills outburst ====
During the filming of the final judges' auditions session in December 2014, while giving feedback to busker Sally Faherty, judge Natalia Kills used strong language, including profanity, to admonish audience members. Some members of the audience were shocked at the outburst and walked out. A TV3 spokeswoman said both the network and Kills apologised for the incident. The incident was featured in the final audition episode, with the profanity bleeped out. Faherty was also heard using bleeped language backstage.

==== Shae Brider ====
In the sixth audition show, singer Shae Brider auditioned and was put through to the Boot Camp round. In the episode, Brider revealed that he had been involved in a 2004 murder in Wanganui and had served six years in prison for manslaughter. In reaction to criticism from the public and media, MediaWorks New Zealand issued a statement saying that Brider's criminal record had been fully disclosed when he entered The X Factor and that the New Zealand justice system considers that Brider has paid his debt to society and apologised for any distress the episode may have caused viewers. Donna Travers, the mother of Brider's victim, told media she was "devastated" by Brider's X Factor appearance and felt "revictimised". Brider later told media that he regretted appearing on the series and had not thought through the impact of his appearance. TV3 announced that the first two bootcamp episodes would start with an apology to Travers and her family. International The X Factor producers FremantleMedia Australia and Syco Entertainment discussed the situation with the show's producers, with a spokesperson for FreemantleMedia describing the inclusion of Brider on the show was "a very poor editorial decision" and that "a more rigid approval process" would ensure a similar situation would not happen in future.

==== Berating of contestant ====
During the first live show, Kills bullied and humiliated Joe Irvine during the judges' comments, stating that there was "a doppelganger in our midst". Kills called out Irvine on his apparent copying of the dress sense and hairstyle of her husband, Willy Moon. Kills deemed the contestant a "laughing stock", overtly "cheesy" and "disgusting". Moon continued her rant, saying that Irvine was "like Norman Bates dressing up in his mother's clothing, it's just a little bit creepy". Viewer response to the comments was overwhelmingly negative, with some calling for Kills and Moon to be fired from the show mid-series, some calling them out on their hypocrisy about originality and others simply stating the comments to be disgusting themselves. A Facebook page demanding the two be fired was set up on 15 March 2015, and within twelve hours had amassed over 50,000 likes. The incident led to criticism from the show's sponsors, franchise owner and fellow judges.

Moon and Kills were both fired from the show the day after the incident and left Auckland for Los Angeles. Upon arrival in Los Angeles, Kills made her first public comments on the controversy by wishing luck to Joe Irvine and those in her former category luck in the competition, dismissing the idea of a "manufactured conspiracy" and also stated that "there are many sides to this story". The following day both Kills and Moon made further comments via Twitter, with Kills explicitly apologising to Joe Irvine, while Moon wished him luck in the competition. Kills and Moon were replaced by former X Factor Australia judge Natalie Bassingthwaighte and New Zealand-born drummer Shelton Woolright respectively with immediate effect from the second live show.

=== Ratings ===
- The premiere episode for the second season had an average audience of 343,280. Down 26% from the previous season
- Overall over 1.3 million people watched the first week of the second series.
- Overall the series had an average audience of 328,160 viewers. Down 18% from the average of the previous season.

=== N.Z. Nielsen ratings ===
Colour key:
– Highest rating during the season
– Lowest rating during the season

Ep. #	Episode	Airdate	Timeslot	Average Viewers	Rank (Night)	TV3+1 Viewers	Total Viewers	Rank (Day)	Ref
1	Auditions 1	Sunday February 15, 2015	7:00 - 8:35 pm	304,500	#3	38,780	343,280	#5	
2	Auditions 2	Monday February 16, 2015	7:30 - 8:35 pm	354,750	#1	23,190	377,940	#4	
3	Auditions 3	Tuesday February 17, 2015	7:30 - 8:35 pm	344,080	#1	32,570	376,650	#4	
4	Auditions 4	Sunday February 22, 2015	7:00 - 8:35 pm	328,650	#2	40,420	369,070	#4	
5	Auditions 5	Monday February 23, 2015	7:30 - 8:35 pm	325,100	#1	38,050	363,150	#4	
6	Auditions 6	Tuesday February 24, 2015	7:30 - 8:35 pm	358,300	#1	44,880	403,180	#3	
7	Boot Camp, Top 64 Revealed	Sunday March 1, 2015	7:00 - 8:35 pm	252,610	#3	65,400	318,010	#5	
8	Six Chair Challenge, Boys and Overs	Monday March 2, 2015	7:35 - 8:35 pm	318,200	#2	22,100	340,300	#5	
9	Six Chair Challenge, Groups and Girls	Tuesday March 3, 2015	7:35 - 8:35 pm	306,180	#4	22,620	328,800	#5	
10	Judges Reatreats, Girls and Overs	Sunday March 8, 2015	7:00 - 8:35 pm	259,940	#3	24,830	284,770	#5	
11	Judges Reatreats, Groups and Boys	Monday March 9, 2015	7:35 - 8:35 pm	307,400	#2	25,840	333,240	#5	
12	Judges Reatreats, Top 12 Reveal	Tuesday March 10, 2015	7:35 - 8:35 pm	316,750	#3	36,380	353,130	#4	
13	Live Show 1	Friday March 15, 2015	7:35 - 9:35 pm	281,020	#2	33,490	314,510	#4	
14	Live Results 1	Saturday March 16, 2015	7:30 - 8:30 pm	438,320	#1	45,390	483,710	#3	
15	Live Show 2	Friday March 22, 2015	7:00 - 9:10 pm	314,870	#1	22,890	337,760	#3	
16	Live Results 2	Saturday March 23, 2015	7:30 - 8:35 pm	237,120	#4	18,150	255,270	#7	
17	Live Show 3	Monday March 30, 2015	7:30 - 9:40 pm	324,470	#2	15,890	340,360	#4	
18	Live Results 3	Tuesday March 31, 2015	7:30 - 8:35 pm	—N/a					
19	Live Show 4	Monday April 6, 2015	7:30 - 9:30 pm	236,450	#3	22,890	337,760	#3	
20	Live Results 4	Tuesday April 7, 2015	7:30 - 8:35 pm	247,110	#3	13,910	261,020	#7	
21	Live Show 5	Sunday April 12, 2015	7:00 - 8:55 pm	261,860	#3	26,550	288,410	#5	
22	Live Results 5	Monday April 13, 2015	7:30 - 8:35 pm	336,700	#2	24,600	361,300	#5	
23	Live Show 6	Sunday April 19, 2015	7:00 - 8:30 pm	291,170	#3	19,850	311,020	#5	
24	Live Results 6	Monday April 20, 2015	7:30 - 8:35 pm	271,810	#4	21,100	292,910	#6	
25	Live Show 7	Sunday April 26, 2015	7:00 - 8:35 pm	265,170	#3	17,800	282,970	#5	
26	Live Results 7	Monday April 27, 2015	7:30 - 8:35 pm	283,890	#4	—N/a	283,890	#10	
27	Live Show 8	Sunday May 3, 2015	7:00 - 8:30 pm	242,070	#3	31,620	273,690	#5	
28	Live Results 8	Monday May 4, 2015	7:30 - 8:35 pm	287,130	#4	12,650	299,780	#8	
29	Live Show 9	Sunday May 10, 2015	7:00 - 8:40 pm	341,460	#2	10,270	351,730	#4	
30	Live Results 9	Monday May 11, 2015	7:30 - 8:35 pm	240,620	#4	—N/a	240,620	#8	
31	Grand Final Performances	Sunday May 17, 2015	7:00 - 8:35 pm	325,740	#2	25,970	351,710	#4	
32	Grand Final Decider	Monday May 18, 2015	7:30 - 9:30 pm	326,380	#3	33,530	359,910	#6	
