= I Am Giant =

UK-based rock band

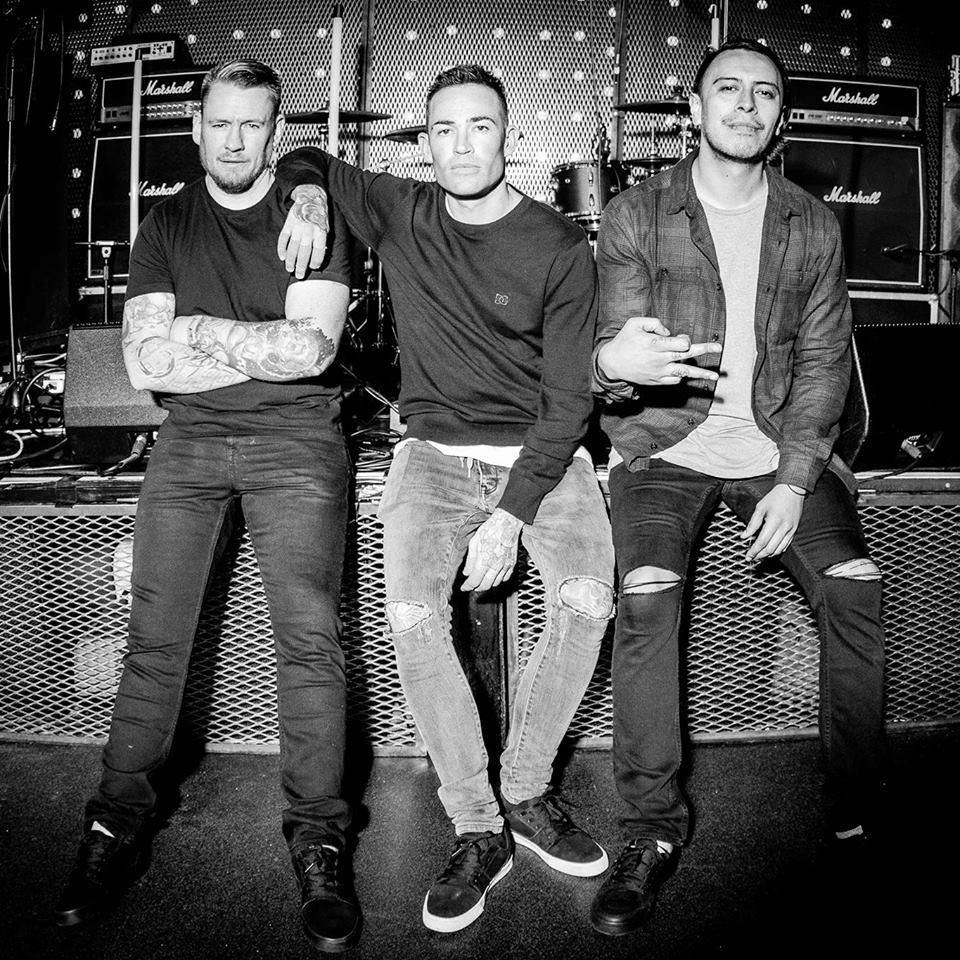
- I Am Giant band members 2017; from left: Paul Matthews, Shelton Woolright, Aja Timu

Background information
- Origin: West Auckland, New Zealand
- Genres: Rock, post-grunge
- Years active: 2008–2018
- Label: Sony
- Members: Aja Timu; Paul Matthews; Shelton Woolright
- Past members: Max O'Donnell; Ed Martin; Ryan Redman; Stuart Steele
- Website: iamgiant.com

I Am Giant is a rock band based in London, United Kingdom. They formed in West Auckland, New Zealand in late 2008 and released their debut album The Horrifying Truth on 1 August 2011 in Australia and New Zealand, where it has been certified Gold and delivered four Rock Chart No. 1's. The album was released in Asia on 23 March 2012, and in Europe and US on 8 October 2012.

The band was formed by New Zealanders Shelton Woolright, Paul Matthews, who then recruited Brit Ed Martin. Drummer Shelton Woolright had been with Blindspott, the only rock band in New Zealand music history to have both their debut and follow up albums enter the charts at number 1 until NZ band Devilskin also took that honour in 2016. Bassist Paul Matthews credits include Tadpole, and more recently Stylus. Matthews is also a producer/engineer and has worked on high-profile kiwi artists including producing Blindspott's debut album. With Woolright they co-produced Six60's single "Rise Up 2.0" which has now gone double platinum.

The band have had tracks featured on extreme sports DVDs including Quiksilver Euroforce Surfing Videos, Mormail Brazilian surfing label's DVD through South America and North America, White Lines magazine in Europe, and 2009 film Cloud 9 (the Kelly Slater story). The band is sponsored by Gibson Guitars.

In December 2014 Ed Martin left the band to embark on a solo project which is to be produced by Paul Matthews.

led to a number of festivals and events including Brixton's Skate and BMX Jam, Quiksilver's 'Chromataphobia' and the Quiksilver Pro Tour in Biarritz, France. In March the band sold out its first tour in New Zealand. In May I Am Giant performed at two Tiger Translate parties in Vietnam before returning for gigs in France, London, and Liverpool (Sound City showcase). They then toured New Zealand, Australia and America through June, July and August, before returning to the UK to play at the British Surf Champs [1] an encore performance at the Quiksilver Pro Tour in Biarritz, France.

In May the band recorded an acoustic cover of Slipknot's single "Duality" for New Zealand's The Rock Radio's Night show segment "Like a Version". The song was released as a free download from the band's website in September 2012.

The City Limits/Neon Sunrise EP was released on 26 March 2010 and saw success in the New Zealand Charts and high rotation on the New Zealand radio stations. The EP received Gold certification.

== The Horrifying Truth (2011–2012) ==
The band spent most of the early months of 2011 in Australia, working on their debut album. Between January and April 2011 The Horrifying Truth was recorded with acclaimed Australian alternative rock producer/engineer Forrester Savell. The album was recorded between Sony Studios in Sydney, and Forrester's studio at Sing Sing Studios in Melbourne. It was co-produced by Matthews and Woolright. During this period, I Am Giant also supported Slash and Stone Temple Pilots during the Big Night Out concert in Singapore.

The Horrifying Truth was released on 1 August 2011. Three days later, the band started a nationwide tour in New Zealand, called 'The Horrifying Truth Tour', which was followed by concerts with Dead Letter Circus in Australia.

At the beginning of 2012 guitarist Aja Timu left the band. Rather than replacing Timu immediately, the band brought in a variety of session guitarists for tours and recording including Andrew Kerr and Michael Triponel. I Am Giant started 2012 with another tour of New Zealand and Australia. They played at what was called the final New Zealand Big Day Out, where they also shot part of the music video for "Purple Heart", with fans holding up frames from the video, which had been shot a week earlier. The video featuring event sponsor's Speight's Summit Beer was debuted during the band's set later that day.

That year the band toured Asia, including Manila, Bangkok, Singapore and Kuala Lumpur. They were supporting Slash's tour in Australia, and a UK tour in support of the October 2012 UK release of The Horrifying Truth. During this tour the band released a German version of the I Am Giant EP, which included their cover of Slipknot's song "Duality" and a new track "Blood Money". I Am Giant also began working on tracks for their second album.

In late December 2012 the band returned to New Zealand for a summer tour opening for New Zealand Rock Legends Shihad. The band debuted the live version of "Blood Money", which was shortly after made available on iTunes.

== Science & Survival and The X Factor NZ (2013–2015) ==
2013 started with the completion of the Shihad tour and a small tour of Australia. I Am Giant also headlined a free concert held by the Auckland Council as part of the council's Music In Parks summer events. I Am Giant were again in the line-up for Homegrown's Rock Stage, where it was announced that the band would be heading to France in May to record the new album.

In June the band started the recording of their unnamed second album at the Drop In Music Studio in Saint-Jean-de-Luz, France. Andrew Kerr did not travel for the recording, Michael Triponel and bassist Paul Matthews filled in on guitars. As with The Horrifying Truth, Forrester Savell is producing the album.

Two singles were released ahead of the album release, "Razor Wire Reality" and "Death of You". The album, Science & Survival, was released on 4 July 2014. "Transmission" and "Standing on the Sun" were released after the tour of New Zealand. Both songs were put onto high rotation on Rock radio stations in New Zealand.

On 15 December I Am Giant released for free download the new song "Russian Doll" which is the first song to feature new singer Ryan Redman.

On 19 March 2015, it was announced that Woolright would be replacing Willy Moon as a judge on The X Factor New Zealand, after Moon was fired.

On 7 May 2015 I Am Giant released a new single, "Kiss From A Ghost", which rose to #1 on the New Zealand iTunes charts following their live performance of the single on the second series of the New Zealand version of The X Factor on 17 May.

== Life in Captivity (2016–present) ==
In March 2016, I Am Giant performed at Homegrown with long time lead guitarist Aja Timu taking the lead vocals position. According to Woolright this was the logical choice upon the departure of Redman as many fans had previously mentioned how good Aja was on backing vocals. The change to Timu as lead singer also lead to the addition of a second guitarist on tour bringing a new dimension to the band's live performances

The remainder of 2016 was fairly quiet for I Am Giant as they spent most of the year writing and recording for the third album due for release in late 2017.

In February 2017, I Am Giant released their first single featuring Timu on vocals, "Dead Flower" followed by "Playing with Fire" in mid-2017 and "Don't Look Back" in February 2018. The album, Life in Captivity, reportedly I Am Giant's last, was released on 16 March 2018.

== Band members ==
Current members

- Aja Timu – vocals, guitar (2010–2012, 2014, 2016–present)
- Andrew Kerr – guitars (2012–present)
- Paul Matthews – bass guitar, backup vocals, album guitars (2008–present)
- Shelton Woolright – drums (2008–present)

Touring members

- Michael Triponel – guitars (2013–2014)

Former members

- Max O'Donnell – guitars (2008–2010)
- Ed Martin – vocals (2008–2014)
- Michael Triponel – guitars (2013–2014)
- Ryan Redman – vocals (2014–2015)
- Stuart Steele – lead guitars (2014–2015)

== Discography ==
I Am Giant discography
- Studio albums: 3
- Extended plays: 2
- Singles: 9

I Am Giant's discography features three studio albums, two extended plays (EPs) and nine singles.

=== Studio albums ===
Year	Album	Peak chart positions	Certification
Year	Album	NZ	Certification
2011	The Horrifying Truth: Released: 1 August 2011; Label: Giant Sound/Sony Music	2	NZ: Platinum
2014	Science & Survival: Released: 4 July 2014; Label: Giant Sound/Sony Music	2	
2018	Life in Captivity: Released: 16 March 2018; Label:Info Giant Sound	26	

=== Extended plays ===
Year	Album	Peak chart positions	Certification
Year	Album	NZ	Certification
2010	City Limits / Neon Sunrise: Released: 26 March 2010; Label: Giant Sound/Sony Music	18	NZ: Gold
2012	I Am Giant: German release; Released: 30 November 2012; Label: Giant Sound/Sony Music	—	
"—" denotes a release that did not chart.

=== Singles ===
I Am Giant's first single "City Limits" was a hit on rock radio in New Zealand, being on A Rotate for nearly five months and, at number 10, was the only new entry in the Rock's Top 20 Best Kiwi Songs of All Time. A music video for the song was released onto band's YouTube Vevo channel on 15 June 2011.

Their second single "Neon Sunrise" debuted in the top 20 singles chart in NZ. The video features 11-time world champion American surfer Kelly Slater. "Neon Sunrise" was featured prominently as the opening track for Derder Paintball 2010 video production Dementia.

Year	Single	Album	Peak chart positions	Music video
Year	Single	Album	NZ	Music video
2010	"City Limits"	I Am Giant EP	38	
2010	"Neon Sunrise"	I Am Giant EP	—	
2010	"Living The Crash"	I Am Giant EP	—	
2011	"And We'll Defy"	The Horrifying Truth	—	
2011	"Let It Go"	The Horrifying Truth	—	
2012	"Purple Heart"	The Horrifying Truth	—	
2014	"Death of You"	Science & Survival	9	
2014	"Minefield"	Science & Survival	10	
2014	"Razor Wire Reality"	Science & Survival	15	
2015	"Kiss from a Ghost"	Kiss from a Ghost	25	
"—" denotes a recording that did not chart.
