= Mae Valley (EP) =

EP by Mae Valley
- Released: 18 March 2016
- Recorded: Parachute Studios, Auckland, 2015
- Genre: Pop, Country pop
- Label: Sony Music Entertainment NZ
- Producer: Sam de Jong

Singles from Mae Valley
- 1. "Brightside" Released: 30 October 2015; 2. "Glitter" Released: TBA

Mae Valley is the self-titled debut EP released by New Zealand country music duo Mae Valley. It was produced by Sam de Jong and released by Sony Music Entertainment New Zealand. The music video for "Brightside" was directed by Shae Sterling and debuted in February 2016.

== Track listing ==
No.	Title	Writer(s)	Length
1.	"Brightside"	Lindsey Lee, Victoria Banks, Marti Frederiksen	3:12
2.	"Hurricane"	Abby Christodoulou, Hannah Cosgrove	3:35
3.	"I Won't Be Long"	Christodoulou, Jamie McDell, Cosgrove	3:34
4.	"Glitter"	Rebecca Lynn Howard, Oliver Visconti, Lee, Stephane Lozac'h	3:14
5.	"Home"	Christodoulou, Cosgrove	2:57

== Personnel ==
- Alister Wood - piano on "Hurricane", "I Won't Be Long" & "Glitter"
- Benny Tipene - acoustic guitar on "Brightside"
- Daniel Cosgrove - acoustic and electric guitars on "Hurricane", "I Won't Be Long" & "Glitter"
- Dave Baxter - banjo on "Brightside"
- Djeisan Suskov - mixing on "Brightside"
- Rhys Machell - bass on "Hurricane" & "Home"
- Sam de Jong - drums, synths, mixing, acoustic guitar on "Glitter"
- Produced and Engineered by Sam de Jong
- Recorded at Parachute Studios
- Mastered by Leon Zervos at Studios 301, Sydney

== Charts ==
Chart (2016)	Peak position
New Zealand Albums Chart	6
