= Te Pikikōtuku o Ngāti Rongomai =

New Zealand kapa haka group

- Origin: Rotorua Lakes District, New Zealand
- Years active: 2013–present
- Members: Tūkiterangi Curtis; Renata Curtis; Rehua Mihaka; Hiria Mihaka; Richard Wharerahi
- Past members: Himiona Herbert

Te Pikikōtuku o Ngāti Rongomai is a New Zealand kapa haka group that formed in 2013, formed from members of Ngāti Rongomai from the Lake Rotoiti area of the Rotorua Lakes District. The group placed second at the 2019 Te Matatini competition. In 2022, the group recorded "Te Ata Māhina", the waiata tira from this performance for the 50th anniversary of Te Matatini. The song became one of the most successful Māori language songs for 2022 in New Zealand.

== Background ==
Te Pikikōtuku o Ngāti Rongomai was formed in 2013 by members of the Te Arawa tribe Ngāti Rongomai, who come from the shores of Lake Rotoiti. The inspiration for the group came from the establishment of Te Wharekura o Ngāti Rongomai in 2009, a Māori language immersion school for the Ngāti Rongomai community. The group debuted during the 2014 Te Arawa regional kapa haka competition.

The group placed second at the 2019 Te Matatini kapa haka festival. Later in the same year, founding member Himiona Herbert died of a brain aneurysm. Te Pikikōtuku o Ngāti Rongomai became the Te Arawa kapa haka regional champions in 2020.

Te Pikikōtuku o Ngāti Rongomai recorded the song "Te Ata Māhina" ("The Breaking Dawn") for He Tau Makuru, an album project celebrating the 50th anniversary of Te Matatini. "Te Ata Māhina" was released on 17 May 2022, and was performed as a collaboration with X Factor singer Whenua Patuwai. "Te Ata Māhina" was a song performed as a waiata tira (choral introduction) at the group's 2019 appearance at Te Matatini. "Te Ata Māhina" was one of the most successful songs sung in Māori in 2022, and was the second highest performing song from the Te Matatini anniversary album, after "Waerea" by Ngā Tūmanako.

Te Pikikōtuku o Ngāti Rongomai were one of the twelve finalists for the 2023 Te Matatini festival. In March 2023, Te Pikikōtuku o Ngāti Rongomai performed at Waipuketia Ki Te Aroha - Flood Them With Love, a free concert in Rotorua to fund relief for the East Coast regions most affected by Cyclone Gabrielle. "Te Ata Māhina" reached number one on the Te Reo Māori singles chart in April 2023, and became the top performing te reo Māori song in New Zealand for 2023.

== Style ==
The group is led in performances by Tūkiterangi Curtis and Renata Curtis. Te Pikikōtuku o Ngāti Rongomai wear a mix of white, black and brown. The men of the group wear maro and korowai, while women wear kaitaka (flax cloaks).

== Discography ==
=== Singles ===
Title	Year	Peak chart positions	Album
Title	Year	NZ Artist	Album
"Te Ata Māhina" (Te Matatini and Te Pikikōtuku o Ngāti Rongomai featuring Whenua Patuwai)	2022	18	He Tau Makuru
