= List of number-one Te Reo Māori singles from the 2020s =

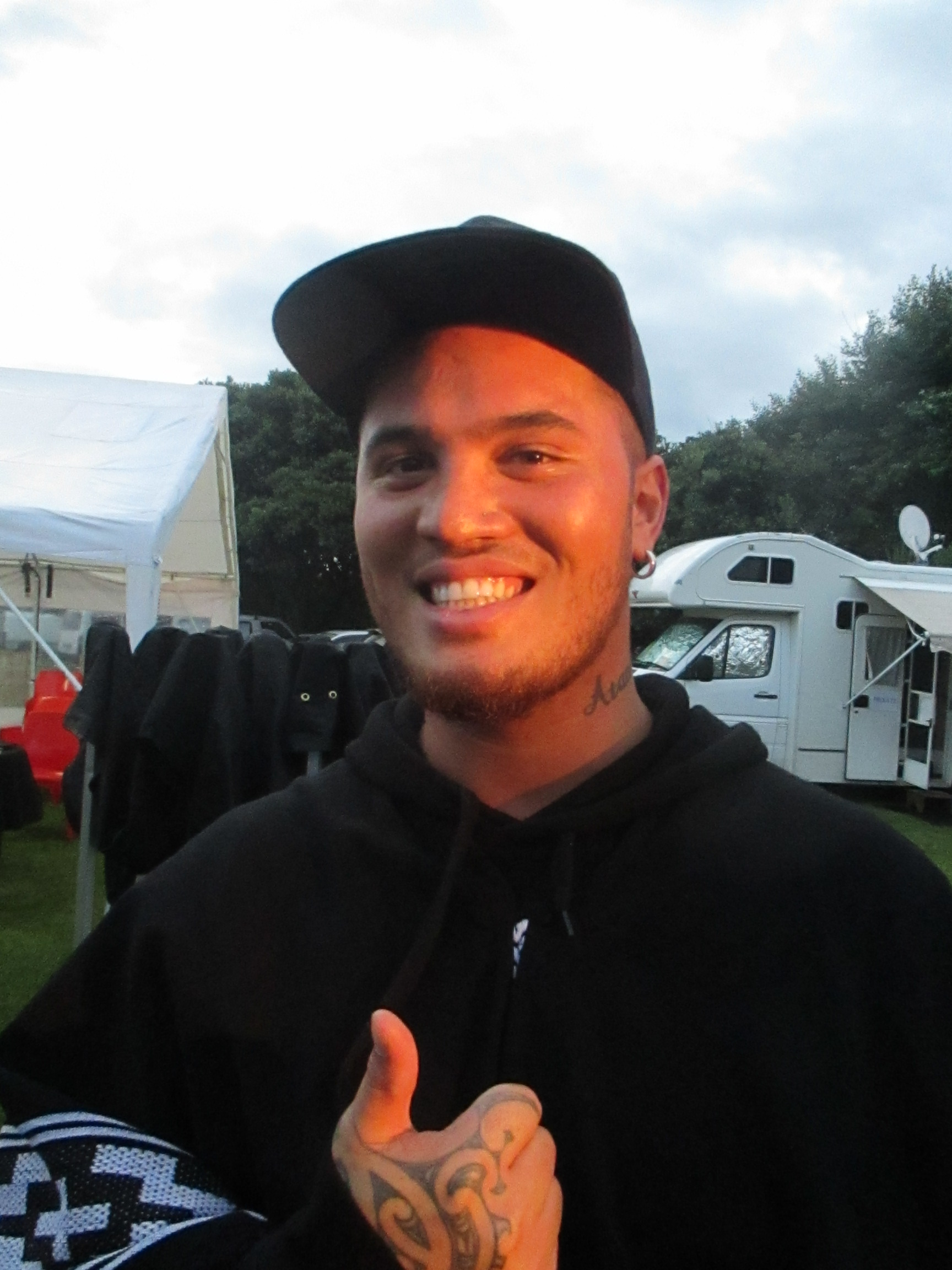
The inaugural number one single was "Tua" by Stan Walker, a Te Reo Māori version of his song "Bigger" performed with his niece Ibanez Maeva.

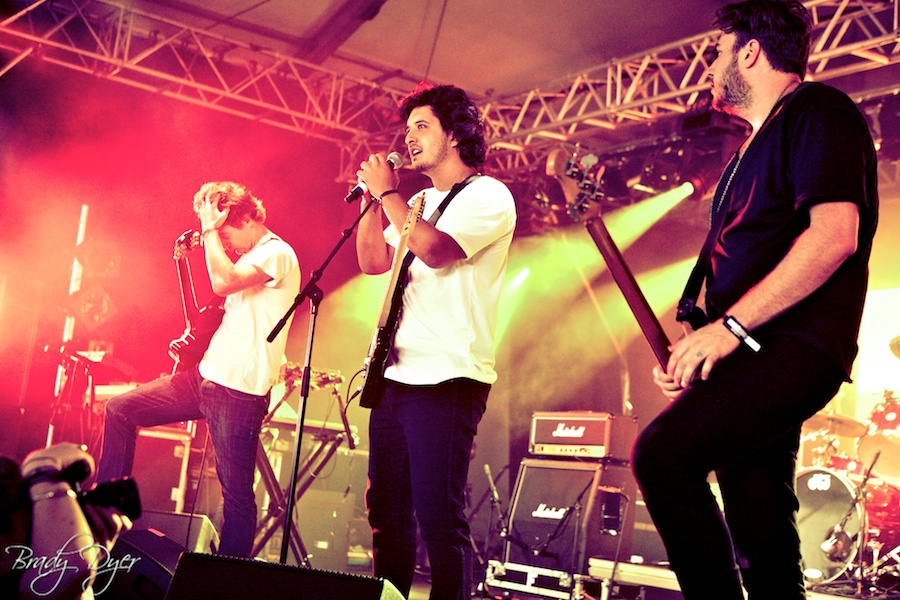
Dunedin band Six60 released "Pepeha" to coincide with Te Wiki o te Reo Māori 2021, created alongside Hinewehi Mohi, who worked with the band in 2019 to create "Kia Mau Ki Tō Ūkaipō", a Te Reo version of their single "Don't Forget Your Roots" for the album Waiata / Anthems (2019).

This is the Recorded Music NZ list of number-one singles in New Zealand sung in Te Reo Māori during the 2020s decade (the Te Reo Māori O Te Rārangi 10 O Runga chart, also known as the Top 10 Te Reo Māori Singles). The first chart was released on 19 June 2021. The chart was launched to celebrate musicians releasing songs in Te Reo Māori, and in order to be eligible, a song needs be sung in at least 70% Māori. Songs are tracked on the chart using sales, streaming and airplay.

== Chart ==
| Artist | Title | Weeks at number-one (Note: The date given is the day when the chart was published. The reporting period is from the preceding week, which is Monday to Sunday. Therefore, the date given is the day after the reporting period ended.) | Reached number-one | Reference |
|---|---|---|---|---|
| Stan Walker featuring Maeva Ibanez | "Tua" | 11 | 21 June 2021 | |
| Six60 | "Pepeha" | 6 | 6 September 2021 | |
| Ka Hao featuring Rob Ruha | "35" | 3 | 18 October 2021 | |
| Six60 | "Pepeha" | 1 | 8 November 2021 | |
| Ka Hao featuring Rob Ruha | "35" | 10 | 15 November 2021 | |
| Six60 | "Pepeha" | 1 | 24 January 2022 | |
| Ka Hao featuring Rob Ruha | "35" | 10 | 31 January 2022 | |
| Six60 | "Pepeha" | 2 | 11 April 2022 | |
| Ka Hao featuring Rob Ruha | "35" | 3 | 25 April 2022 | |
| Six60 | "Pepeha" | 19 | 16 May 2022 | |
| Ka Hao featuring Rob Ruha | "35" | 1 | 26 September 2022 | |
| Six60 | "Pepeha" | 13 | 3 October 2022 | |
| Ka Hao featuring Rob Ruha | "35" | 1 | 9 January 2023 | |
| Six60 | "Pepeha" | 9 | 16 January 2023 | |
| Ka Hao featuring Rob Ruha | "35" | 1 | 27 March 2023 | |
| Te Matatini and Te Pikikōtuku o Ngāti Rongomai featuring Whenua Patuwai | "Te Ata Māhina" | 7 | 3 April 2023 | |
| Corrella | "Ko Au (I Am Me)" | 1 | 22 May 2023 | |
| Te Matatini and Te Pikikōtuku o Ngāti Rongomai featuring Whenua Patuwai | "Te Ata Māhina" | 8 | 29 May 2023 | |
| Tawaz | "He Aho" | 10 | 24 July 2023 | |
| Te Matatini and Te Pikikōtuku o Ngāti Rongomai featuring Whenua Patuwai | "Te Ata Māhina" | 3 | 2 October 2023 | |
| Tawaz | "He Aho" | 1 | 23 October 2023 | |
| Te Matatini and Te Pikikōtuku o Ngāti Rongomai featuring Whenua Patuwai | "Te Ata Māhina" | 2 | 30 October 2023 | |
| Tawaz | "He Aho" | 15 | 13 November 2023 | |
| Stan Walker | "Māori Ki Te Ao" | 3 | 4 March 2024 | |
