= Jackie Thomas (album) =

Studio album by Jackie Thomas
- Released: 9 August 2013
- Recorded: July 2013, Auckland
- Genre: Pop
- Length: 42:12
- Label: Sony Music New Zealand

Singles from Jackie Thomas
- 1. "It's Worth It" Released: 22 July 2013

Jackie Thomas is the self-titled debut (and only) studio album by Jackie Thomas, the winner of the first New Zealand series of The X Factor, released through Sony Music New Zealand on 9 August 2013. It debuted at number one in the New Zealand album charts and was certified Gold. The album's lead single "It's Worth It" preceded the album's release.

== Background ==
The album was recorded days after Thomas became the winner of the first New Zealand series of The X Factor. The album comprises 12 tracks, 11 of which are cover versions of songs that Thomas originally performed in the live shows of The X Factor. It features her highly praised audition song "Skinny Love". The lead single "It's Worth It" is the album's one original song.

== Singles ==
Following Thomas' win on the first series of The X Factor (New Zealand) on 22 July 2013, her winner's single "It's Worth It" was released for digital download and on CD, and served as the lead single from the album. The song debuted at number one and was certified Platinum. Album track "Skinny Love" also charted at 23.

== Response ==
Professional ratings
Review scores
Source	Rating
New Zealand Herald	(2.5/5)

In his review in the New Zealand Herald's TimeOut entertainment supplement, music writer Scott Kara described the album as appealing to fans of Jackie Thomas, but noted that, "although Thomas has a great voice, her performances are tentative". Kara singled out the versions of "Skinny Love" and "Dreams" as album highlights.

== Track listing ==
No.	Title	Writer(s)	Original artist	Length
1.	"It's Worth It"	Anthony Egizii, David Musumeci, Adam Argyle	Jackie Thomas	3:13
2.	"Skinny Love"	Justin Vernon	Bon Iver	3:23
3.	"Next to Me"	Emeli Sandé, Hugo Chegwin, Harry Craze	Emeli Sandé	3:17
4.	"Video Games"	Elizabeth Grant, Justin Parker	Lana Del Rey	4:31
5.	"Angel"	Sarah McLachlan	Sarah McLachlan	3:44
6.	"Maybe Tomorrow"	Geoff Maddock	Goldenhorse	2:56
7.	"Son of a Preacher Man"	John Hurley, Ronnie Wilkins	Dusty Springfield	2:21
8.	"Toxic"	Cathy Dennis, Henrik Jonback, Christian Karlsson and Pontus Winnberg	Britney Spears	2:38
9.	"Dreams"	Stevie Nicks	Fleetwood Mac	4:15
10.	"Stay"	Mikky Ekko, Justin Parker	Rihanna	4:02
11.	"Black Velvet"	David Tyson, Christopher Ward	Alannah Myles	3:55
12.	"Wonderwall"	Noel Gallagher	Oasis	4:02
Total length:				42:12

== Charts and certifications ==
=== Charts ===
Chart (2013)	Peak position
New Zealand Albums Chart	1

=== Certifications ===
Region	Certificatiom	Sales/shipments
New Zealand (RMNZ)	Gold	7,500^
^shipments figures based on certification alone
