= Jackie Thomas (singer) =

- Born: Jackie Thomas; 18 November 1990 (age 36); Greymouth, New Zealand
- Origin: Auckland, New Zealand
- Genre: Pop
- Occupation: Singer
- Years active: 2013–present
- Label: Sony Music New Zealand
- Website: facebook.com/jackiethomasmusic

Jackie Thomas (born 18 November 1990) is a New Zealand singer who won the first New Zealand season of The X Factor in 2013. Competing in the Girls category, she was mentored in the series by Daniel Bedingfield. Her winner's single "It's Worth It" was released on 22 July 2013 and debuted at number one on the New Zealand Music Charts. The song became certified Gold in its first week and eventually reached Platinum by its third week.

== Early life ==
Jackie Thomas was born in Greymouth in 1990. She has Māori and European ancestry. Her father is of Ngāpuhi descent. She received her education at Greymouth High School. After school, she worked at her father's meatworks in Greymouth before moving to Auckland in January 2013. Prior to entering The X Factor, Thomas had little professional performance experience.

== The X Factor ==
Thomas initially attended the Greymouth pre-audition on 11 January 2013, where she was put through to the judges' auditions. At her judges' audition Thomas performed Birdy's version of the Bon Iver song "Skinny Love", prompting judge Melanie Blatt to declare "I think I've just witnessed a performance from the winner of X Factor." After Thomas' audition screened, Birdy's 2011 recording of "Skinny Love" entered the New Zealand pop charts for the first time, peaking at #2. After being eliminated on day two of bootcamp, Thomas was brought back to judges' retreats after the Girls category mentor Daniel Bedingfield campaigned for her return, threatening to quit the show if Thomas wasn't allowed back.

Thomas was the only contestant never to have been in the bottom two, and was one of the three contestants to make it to the grand finale, alongside Whenua Patuwai and Benny Tipene. At the grand final on 22 July 2013, Thomas was announced the winner of the competition and it was revealed that she had been the top-voted contestant in seven of the 10 live shows. She performed her winner's single "It's Worth It" on the final episode, with the single released later that evening.

== After The X Factor ==
After The X Factor, Jackie's debut single, "It's Worth It", was released in July 2013. It debuted at number 1 on the Official New Zealand Music Chart and was certified Gold in its first week and Platinum in its third week. Thomas's self-titled debut album Jackie Thomas was released on 9 August 2013. It debuted at number one and was certified Gold. The album contains Thomas' debut single "It's Worth It", as well as studio recordings of 11 of the 14 songs she performed in The X Factor live shows. The album track "Skinny Love" also charted at 23 in the singles chart.

In November 2013, Thomas opened for Olly Murs at his New Zealand show, and in late 2013 she performed at the Christmas in the Park events in Auckland and Christchurch. In August 2014, Thomas featured with other New Zealand artists on the charity single "A Song for Everyone".

Thomas received funding from NZ On Air for the recording and video production of two songs, "Stars" (April 2014) and "Until the Last Goodbye" (February 2015). "Until the Last Goodbye" was released as Thomas' follow-up single on 16 March 2015, with a live performance on the second series of The X Factor.

Jackie was the opening act for Ricky Martin's New Zealand tour in April 2015. In June, Thomas released Until the Last Goodbye EP, which included the title track, "Stars" and three live tracks. She has not released any new material since.

== Discography ==
=== Albums ===
| Title | Album details | Peak chart positions | Certifications |
| Title | Album details | NZ | Certifications |
|---|---|---|---|
| Jackie Thomas | Released: 9 August 2013; Label: Sony Music NZ; Catalogue: 0888837664127; Formats: CD, digital download | 1 | RMNZ: Gold |

=== EPs ===
| Title | Album details | Peak chart positions |
| Title | Album details | NZ |
|---|---|---|
| Until the Last Goodbye | Released: 20 June 2015; Label: Sony Music NZ; Formats: Digital download | — |

=== Singles ===
| Title | Year | Peak chart positions | Certifications | Album |
| Title | Year | NZ | Certifications | Album |
|---|---|---|---|---|
| "It's Worth It" | 2013 | 1 | RMNZ: Platinum | Jackie Thomas |
| "Until the Last Goodbye" | 2015 | 35 | | Until the Last Goodbye EP |

==== As featured artist ====
| Title | Year | Peak chart positions | Album |
| Title | Year | NZ Artists | Album |
|---|---|---|---|
| "Song For Everyone" (as part of All Star Cast) | 2014 | 5 | Non-album single |

=== Other charted songs ===
| Title | Year | Peak chart positions | Album |
| Title | Year | NZ | Album |
|---|---|---|---|
| "Skinny Love" | 2013 | 23 | Jackie Thomas |
