= Ngā Kapa Haka Kura Tuarua o Aotearoa =

Kapa Haka competition

Ngā Kapa Haka Kura Tuarua o Aotearoa is the national biennial kapa haka Māori cultural festival for secondary schools in New Zealand. The festival takes the form of a competition, and groups go through a series of local and regional events to be selected for the national competition. Many participants go on to be part of teams in Te Matatini, which is known as the 'Olympics of kapa haka'.

There is also a primary schools national kapa haka competition, Te Mana Kuratahi.

== History ==
Ngā Kapa Haka Kura Tuarua o Aotearoa has been held biennially since 2000.

In 2012 approximately 1800 students representing 43 groups took part in Whangārei at Kensington Stadium.

In 2016 there were 1500 students from 39 schools in the competitions held in Napier. The team Te Rōpū Raukura from Rotorua won for the first time, with students from Rotorua Boys' and Rotorua Girls' High School. From Western Springs Ngā Puna o Waiorea, tutored by Pere Wihongi, were second.

Te Rōpū Raukura from Rotorua won again in 2018. There 41 schools involved and more than 1500 students, the competition was held in Palmerston North.

The competition was cancelled for the first time during the COVID-19 pandemic in 2020.

In 2022, the event returned but in a new format. Due to COVID-19 restrictions, the competition was held over two days, instead of five, and split in five different locations where groups performed on stage behind closed doors to mitigate any potential impact of an outbreak. Performances were broadcast on Whakaata Māori.

In June 2024, Ngā Kapa Haka Kura Tuarua o Aotearoa was held in Nelson, the Government Minister of Māori Development Tama Potaka was in attendance and said: “Thank you for helping to ensure the future of kapa haka – and indeed the growing future of Te Matatini – stands proud on the stage.” There were 42 schools that took part and all three teams from the Te Arawa region competed in the top nine in the finals, with Ngā Kura Kaupapa Māori o Te Puku o te Ika a Māui winning.

By 2024 because of Kura Kaupapa Māori, more students in 'Māori medium education' and revitalisation of Te Reo Māori (Māori language) there was a doubling in primary and secondary school kapa haka teams in the South Island over the past five years.

== Past Winners ==
Year	Rōpū (Group)	Location	Ref
2024	Ngā Kura Kaupapa Māori o Te Puku o te Ika a Māui	Nelson/Whakatū	
2022	Te Wharekura o Hoani Waititi Marae	Online-based	
2020	Cancelled	-	
2018	Te Rōpū Raukura	Palmerston North/Rangitāne	
2016	Te Rōpū Raukura	Napier/Te Matau a Māui	
2014	Rākaumangamanga	Gisborne/Turanga nui ā Kiwa	
2012	Te Rōpū Kapa Haka o Ngā Taiātea	Whāngarei	
2010	Te Rōpū Rangatahi o Ritana	Rotorua	
2008	Te Piringa	Wellington/Pōneke	
2006	Rākaumangamanga	Waikato	
2004	Western heights/Ruatoki	TBA	
2002	Te Wharekura o Hoani Waititi Marae	Christchurch/Ōtautahi	
2000	Rākaumangamanga	Auckland/Tāmaki Makaurau	
