= It's Worth It =

2013 single by Jackie Thomas

Single by Jackie Thomas

from the album Jackie Thomas
- Released: July 22, 2013
- Recorded: July 2013, Auckland, New Zealand
- Genre: Pop
- Length: 3:12
- Label: Sony Music New Zealand
- Songwriters: Anthony Egizii, David Musumeci, Adam Argyle

"It's Worth It" is the winner's single by the first New Zealand series winner of The X Factor, Jackie Thomas. It was released digitally on 22 July 2013 and on CD single on 26 July, as the lead single from her self-titled debut album. "It's Worth It" was written by Anthony Egizii and David Musumeci (DNA Songs) and Adam Argyle. It debuted at number one on the Official New Zealand Music Chart and was certified gold in its first week by Recorded Music NZ.

== Background and release ==
"It's Worth It" was written by David Musumeci and Anthony Egizii (DNA Songs) and Adam Argyle. The single was released for digital download on the evening of The X Factor grand final on 22 July, with the CD single release on 26 July.

== Reception ==
"It's Worth It" debuted at number one on the New Zealand Singles Chart on 29 July 2013, and was certified gold that same week. It remained at number one the following week. "It's Worth It" was certified platinum by 9 August 2013.

== Live performances ==
Thomas performed "It's Worth It" live for the first time during The X Factor grand final show on 22 July. Thomas performed the song again later in the show after she was announced as the winner. On 9 August 2013, she appeared on Firstline for an interview, and sang "It's Worth It" afterward.

== Music video ==
The music video for "It's Worth It" was released on 12 August. Directed by Anna Duckworth and produced by Alix Whittaker, both of Candlelit Pictures, the video was filmed in one shot. It features Thomas walking around a black room, surrounded by bare lightbulbs that brighten and dim with the rhythm and dynamics of the song. Pre-production of the video began on 26 July, four days after Thomas' The X Factor win. The video production was wrapped within one week.

== Track listing ==
- CD single / digital download
1. "It's Worth It" – 3:12

== Release history ==
Country	Date	Format	Label
New Zealand	22 July 2013	Digital download	Sony Music New Zealand
New Zealand	26 July 2013	CD single	Sony Music New Zealand

== Chart positions ==
As well as peaking at number 1 in the weekly singles chart, "It's Worth It" was ranked number 36 in the Official New Zealand Music Chart's 2013 year-end chart, and number 4 in the 2013 year-end chart for New Zealand artists.

Chart (2013)	Peak position
New Zealand (Recorded Music NZ)	1

== See also ==
- List of number-one singles from the 2010s (New Zealand)
