= The X Factor (New Zealand TV series) series 1 =

The X Factor
- Series 1
- Hosted by: Dominic Bowden
- Judges: Melanie Blatt; Stan Walker; Ruby Frost; Daniel Bedingfield
- Winner: Jackie Thomas
- Winning mentor: Daniel Bedingfield
- Runner-up: Whenua Patuwai
- Finals venue: Auckland Film Studios, Henderson, Auckland

Release
- Original network: TV3
- Original release: April 2013 – 22 July 2013

Series chronology
- Next → Series 2

The first series of the New Zealand television reality music competition The X Factor premiered on TV3 on 21 April 2013 and ended on 22 July 2013. The show was open to singers aged 14 and over. The contestants were split into the show's four traditional categories: Boys, Girls, Over 25s and Groups.

The winner was 22-year-old Greymouth singer Jackie Thomas, and her winner's single, "It's Worth It", was released the day of the final. As the winner, Thomas received a Sony Music Entertainment New Zealand recording contract and a new car. Runners-up Whenua Patuwai and Benny Tipene each released a single via Sony. Fourth-place-getters Moorhouse were also signed to Sony Music New Zealand, with plans for an album release by Christmas 2013.

The series was hosted by Dominic Bowden. Recording artists Melanie Blatt, Stan Walker, Ruby Frost and Daniel Bedingfield were the show's four judges. Auckland student Georgie Wright was selected from over 100 applicants to present the show's behind-the-scenes video blog Samsung Insider.

The initial pre-audition tour of 27 towns and cities was held in January and early February 2013, with the judges auditions round filmed in late February and early March, and the bootcamp filmed in mid-March in Auckland. The series screened on Sunday and Monday evenings.

== Development ==
The X Factor was created by Simon Cowell in the United Kingdom and the New Zealand version is based on the original UK series. TV3 initially purchased the rights to produce a local version of The X Factor in 2010. In September 2012, TV3 finally confirmed that the show would begin production in early 2013. Broadcast funding agency NZ On Air confirmed they would contribute $1.6 million as a minority investor, for the production of 30 episodes of 60 minutes duration each.

The series was co-produced by MediaWorks and FremantleMedia Australia. The show's key sponsors were Ford New Zealand as broadcast sponsor, Samsung Electronics as technology partner with McDonald's and Coca-Cola as programme partners.

== Judges and host ==
Series 1 Judges (Seat Order)

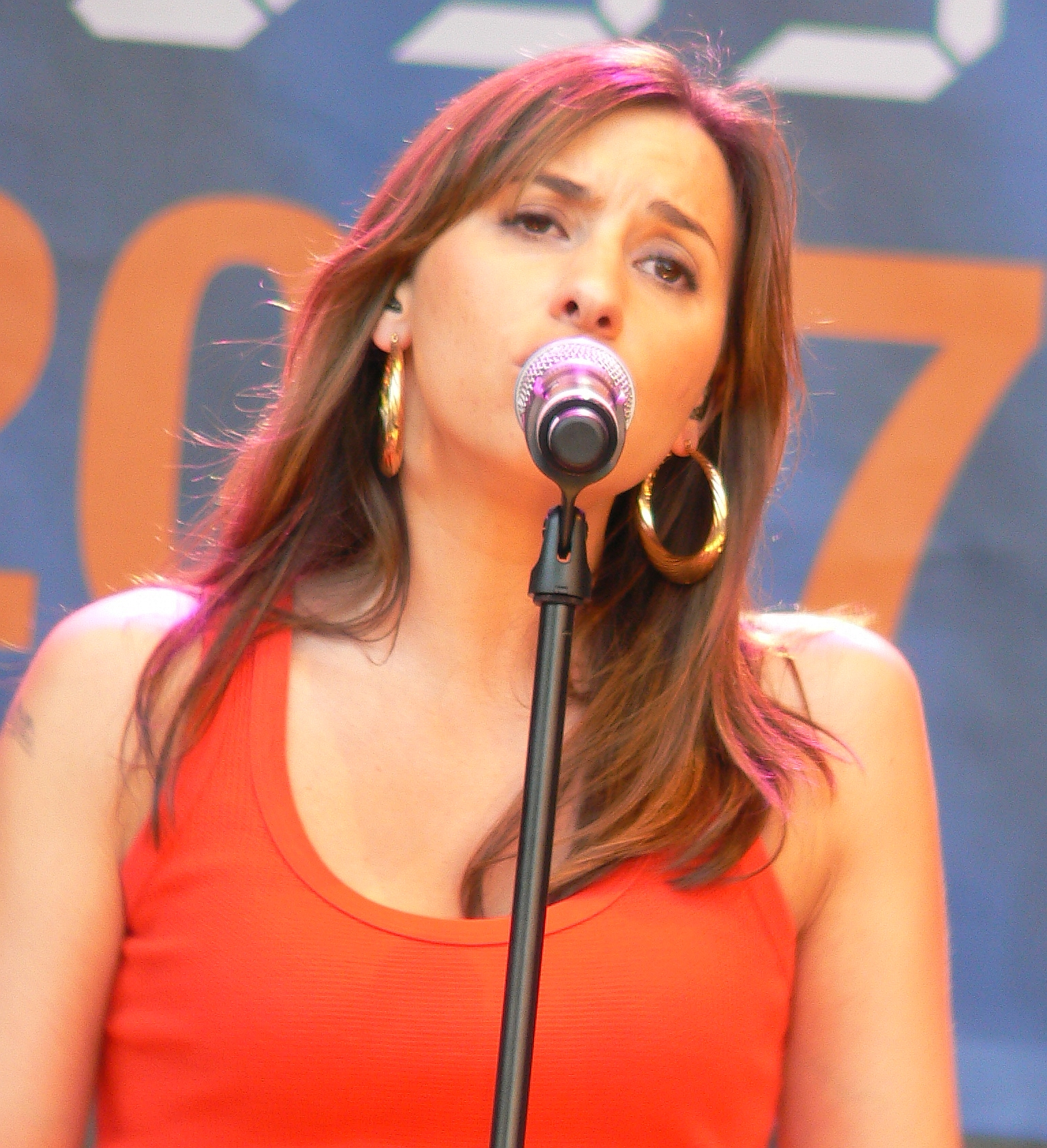
Melanie Blatt

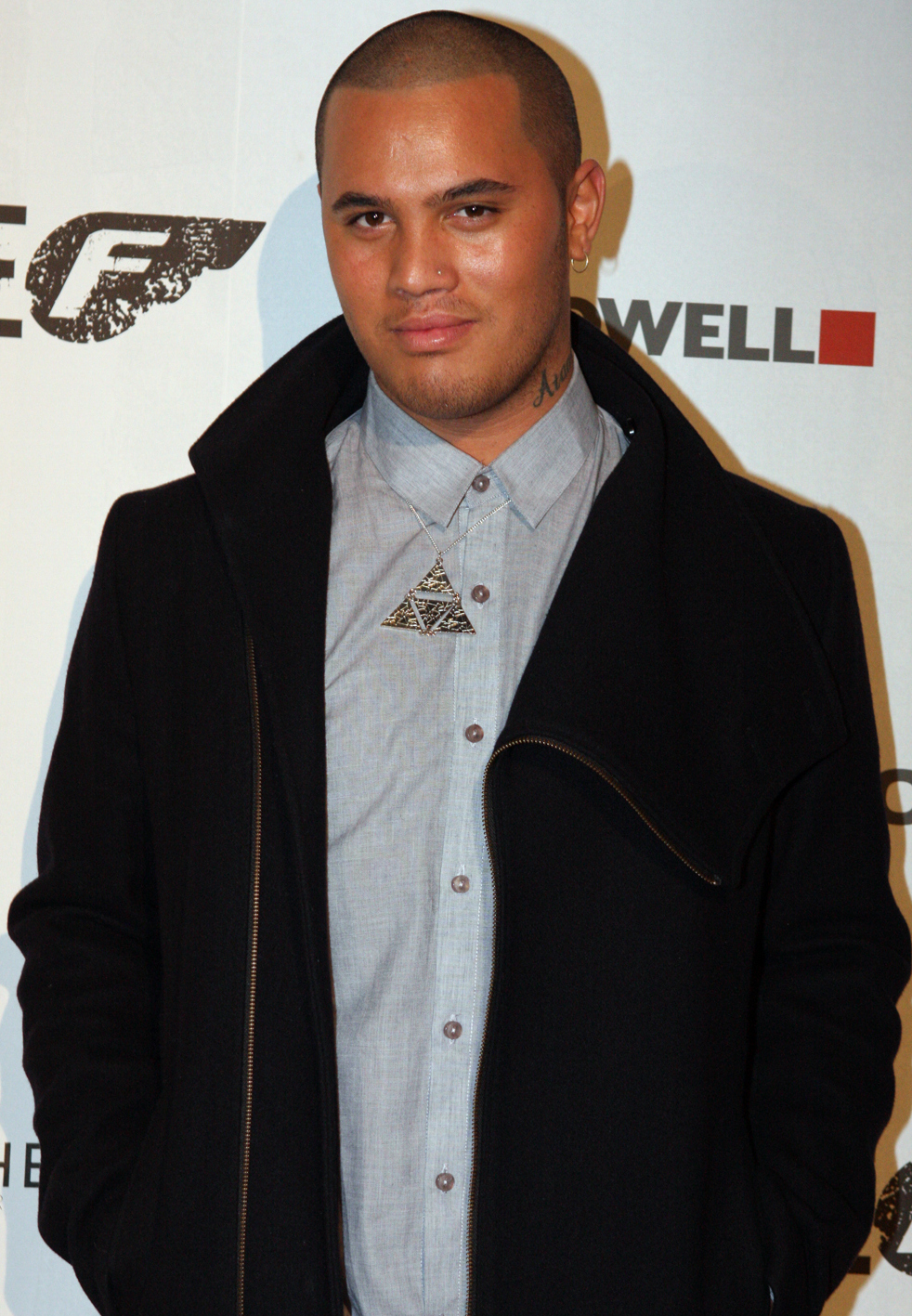
Stan Walker

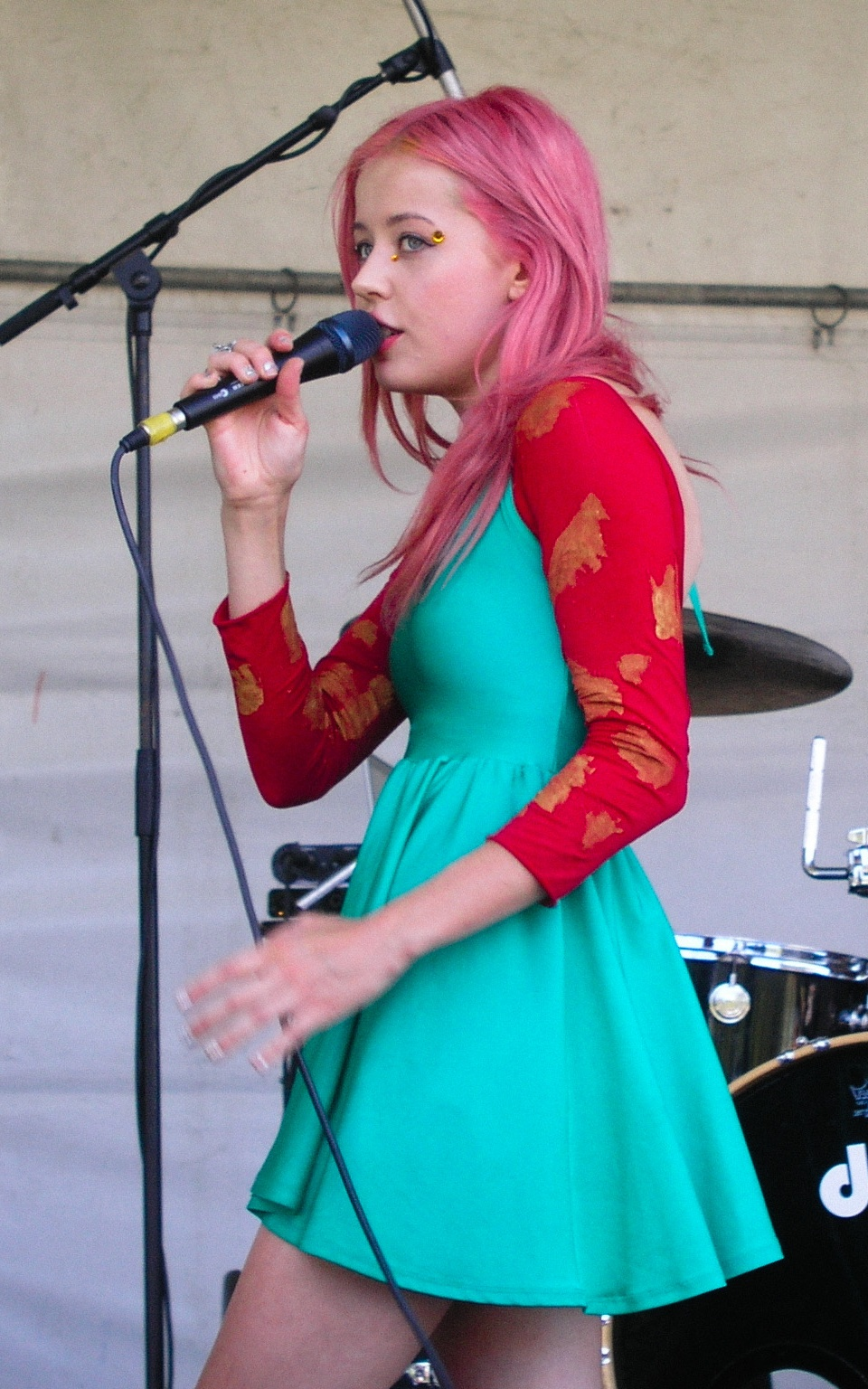
Ruby Frost

Daniel Bedingfield

In November 2012, Australian Idol winner and recording artist, Stan Walker, was announced as the first judge. In December 2012, Daniel Bedingfield was announced as the second judge. The following month, former All Saints member, Melanie Blatt, and Ruby Frost were confirmed as the final two judges.

In October 2012 Dominic Bowden was confirmed as the host.

== Selection process ==
=== Pre-auditions ===
The first appeal for applicants was made on 11 November 2012, with the announcement of the application process and the pre-audition tour details. Pre-auditions in front of the show's producers began on 5 January 2013 and continued through 27 towns and cities across New Zealand. More than 6,000 contestants auditioned, and were either rejected outright with a "no" response or considered for the next round with a "maybe" response.

Cities where the pre-auditions were held.

Audition city/town	Dates	Venue
Queenstown	5 January 2013	Performing Arts Centre
Invercargill	6 January 2013	Southland Girls' High School
Dunedin	7 January 2013	Logan Park High School
Oamaru	8 January 2013	Oamaru Opera House
Timaru	9 January 2013	West End Hall
Greymouth	11 January 2013	Regent Cinema
Christchurch	12–13 January 2013	Addington Raceway
Nelson	15 January 2013	Nelson School of Music
Blenheim	16 January 2013	Marlborough Girls' College
Wellington	18 January 2013	Wellington High School
Kāpiti	19 January 2013	Kāpiti College
Wanganui	20 January 2013	Wanganui War Memorial Hall
Palmerston North	21 January 2013	Awapuni Racecourse
Masterton	22 January 2013	Masterton Town Hall
Napier	23 January 2013	East Pier
Gisborne	25 January 2013	Lawson Field Theatre
Tauranga	26 January 2013	16th Ave Theatre
Rotorua	27 January 2013	John Paul College
Taupō	28 January 2013	The Great Lake Centre
Hamilton	29 January 2013	The Meteor
Tairua	30 January 2013	Tairua Community Hall
South Auckland	1 February 2013	Manukau Institute of Technology
Auckland Central	2 February 2013	TAPAC
New Plymouth	3 February 2013	New Plymouth Girls' High School
Whangārei	4 February 2013	The Pulse
Kerikeri	5 February 2013	Kingston House
Kaitaia	6 February 2013	Te Ahu Community Hall

=== Judges' auditions ===
The auditionees chosen by the producers were invited back to the last set of auditions that took place in front of the judges and a live studio audience. These auditions were filmed at Skycity Theatre in Auckland from 26 February to 3 March and broadcast from 21 to 29 April. The 120 successful contestants then progressed to the bootcamp round.

- Auditions 1 (21 April 2013)
  Special appearance: Ronan Keating
  Featured successful auditionees: Finlay Robertson, Nick Van de Vlierd, Aotea Beazley, The Steamrollers, Benny Tipene, Maaka Fiso, Meryl Cassie, Madeline Bradley, William Tokelau and Te Ao Te Huia.
- Auditions 2 (22 April 2013)
  Special appearance: Topp Twins
  Featured successful auditionees: Franko Heke, Ashley Tonga, L.O.V.E, The Talent, Voltech, Gap5, Fletcher Mills, Cameron Luxton, Jessie Matthews, Tia Hunt, Cameron Rota, Sam Yeoward and Renee Maurice.
- Auditions 3 (28 April 2013)
  Featured successful auditionees: Taiaroa Neho, Alex Familton, Anabac, Liam Kennedy-Clark, Eden Roberts, Tjay Faaosofia, Vasa Faaosofia, Cassie Henderson, Tom Batchelor, Oriana Faaumu and Bryan Townley.
- Auditions 4 (29 April 2013)
  Featured successful auditionees: 3rd Watch, Shaan Singh, Taye Williams, Anna Wilson, Brianna Phillips, Jordan Edwards, Fadzai Paradza, Sorelle, Finley Brentwood, Preeti Narayan, Puhi Tau, Phebe Martin-Holgate, Sharaine Barrett, Hannah Cosgrove, Jasmyn Kereama, Khona Va’aga-Gray, Esther Crispin, Whenua Patuwai, Tania Pari, Moorhouse and Jackie Thomas.

==== Fast Ford Boot Camp ====
The Edge radio station and series sponsor Ford held a second-chance competition called Fast Ford Boot Camp. Chosen from video auditions, five acts attended the week-long Fast Ford Boot Camp in Auckland before auditioning in front of three X Factor judges live on The Edge's breakfast show on 15 March. From there, singers Geordie Meade, Meghan Fraser and Grace Ikenasio were chosen by the judges to continue to the X Factor bootcamp round.

=== Bootcamp ===
The bootcamp round was filmed at Vector Arena in Auckland from 16 to 21 March and broadcast on 5 and 6 May. Contestants were given two performance challenges. On the first day, the 120 contestants were split into the four category groups - Boys, Girls, Over 25s and Groups. Acts in each category were given one song to sing: "Come On Home" (Boys), "Firework" (Girls), "Iris" (Over 25s) and "Man in the Mirror" (Groups). Contestants were aided by vocal coach Turanga Merito and choreographer Emma McLachlan. After the performances, the judges sent home half the acts. On the second day, the remaining 60 acts were put into ensembles and chose a song which they had to learn and perform for the judges. From the bootcamp, 24 successful acts (six in each category) progressed to the judges' retreats round. Rejected soloists Sam Yeoward and Cameron Rota from the Boys category and former 3rd Watch member Peniamina Sofai were brought back by judges and asked to form a group. This group was named The Young Project (TYP).

The elimination of popular contestant Jackie Thomas, who had performed poorly at bootcamp, stirred debate amongst viewers. A Facebook group was formed urging the show to bring her back, while Birdy's 2011 recording of Jackie's audition song "Skinny Love" entered the New Zealand charts, peaking at number 2. At judges' retreats, Daniel Bedingfield made the decision to bring back Jackie to join the six girls at his retreat.

The 25 successful acts were:

- Boys: Tom Batchelor, Liam Kennedy-Clark, Fletcher Mills, Taiaroa Neho, Whenua Patuwai, Benny Tipene
- Girls: Aotea Beazley, Madeline Bradley, Oriana Faaumu, Cassie Henderson, Eden Roberts, Finlay Robertson, Jackie Thomas
- Over 25s: Maaka Fiso, Grace Ikenasio, Jessie Matthews, Bryan Townley, Taye Williams, Anna Wilson
- Groups: Anabac, Gap5, L.O.V.E, Moorhouse, Voltech, The Young Project (TYP)

=== Judges' retreats ===
The judges retreats episodes were filmed over the month of April in locations in New Zealand, the Cook Islands and Australia. The judges received news of their categories from the show's producer via telephone, seen during the second bootcamp episode on 6 May. Daniel Bedingfield also brought previously eliminated contestant Jackie Thomas back to the Girls category. Bedingfield mentored the Girls in Rarotonga, assisted by his sister Natasha Bedingfield; Blatt joined the Groups at Mahurangi with S Club 7 member Rachel Stevens; Frost took the Boys to Sydney, assisted by former Australian X Factor judge Guy Sebastian; and Walker had the Over 25s in Queenstown with New Zealand singer Hollie Smith. Each act performed one song for their mentor and assistant. The judges then selected their top three contestants, which make up the final 12 and progressed to the live shows.

At the end of judges' retreats, it was announced that each judge could bring one further act back as a wildcard. The public then voted for which of the four wildcards would become the 13th finalist. This left one judge with an extra act. Fletcher Mills was revealed as the winner on 14 May. The show's producers had originally intended for the wildcard to be announced on the first live show on 19 May, but after judge Melanie Blatt mistakenly tweeted the news on 14 May, the official announcement was made early.

Key:

– Wildcard Winner

Summary of judges' retreats
Judge	Category	Location	Assistant	Acts eliminated	Wildcards
Bedingfield	Girls	Rarotonga	Natasha Bedingfield	Madeline Bradley, Oriana Faaumu, Finlay Robertson	Aotea Beazley
Blatt	Groups	Mahurangi	Rachel Stevens	Anabac, Voltech	The Young Project (TYP)
Frost	Boys	Sydney	Guy Sebastian	Liam Kennedy-Clark, Taiaroa Neho	Fletcher Mills
Walker	Over 25s	Queenstown	Hollie Smith	Jessie Matthews, Bryan Townley	Grace Ikenasio

== Acts ==
Key:

– Winner
– Runner-Up
– Third Place

Category (Mentor)	Acts			
Boys (Frost)	Tom Batchelor	Fletcher Mills	Whenua Patuwai	Benny Tipene
Girls (Bedingfield)	Cassie Henderson	Eden Roberts	Jackie Thomas	
Over 25s (Walker)	Maaka Fiso	Taye Williams	Anna Wilson	
Groups (Blatt)	Gap5	L.O.V.E	Moorhouse	

== Live shows ==
The live shows began on 19 May and were filmed at Auckland Film Studios in Henderson, Auckland. The shows were simulcast on national radio network More FM.

=== Results summary ===
Colour key
– Act in the bottom two and had to perform in the final showdown
– Act was in the bottom three but received the fewest votes and was immediately eliminated
– Act received the lowest number of public votes and was immediately eliminated (no final showdown)

Weekly results per act
Act	Week 1	Week 2	Week 3	Week 4	Week 5	Week 6	Week 7	Quarter-Final	Semi-Final	Final	
Act	Week 1	Week 2	Week 3	Week 4	Week 5	Week 6	Week 7	Quarter-Final	Semi-Final	First Monday Vote	Second Monday Vote
Jackie Thomas	2nd	1st	1st	1st	1st	4th	1st	1st	2nd	1st	Winner; 46.4%
Whenua Patuwai	3rd	2nd	2nd	2nd	4th	2nd	3rd	4th	3rd	2nd	Runner-Up; 35.7%
Benny Tipene	4th	3rd	3rd	4th	6th	6th	2nd	3rd	1st	3rd 17.9%	Eliminated (Final)
Moorhouse	5th	4th	10th	6th	2nd	1st	4th	2nd	4th	Eliminated (Semi-Final)	
Cassie Henderson	8th	8th	5th	5th	3rd	3rd	5th	5th	Eliminated (Quarter-Final)		
Gap5	7th	6th	4th	9th	8th	5th	6th	Eliminated (Week 7)			
Tom Batchelor	9th	9th	6th	3rd	5th	7th	Eliminated (Week 6)				
Anna Wilson	6th	5th	7th	7th	7th	Eliminated (Week 5)					
Maaka Fiso	1st	7th	8th	8th	Eliminated (Week 4)						
Fletcher Mills	10th	10th	9th	10th	Eliminated (Week 4)						
L.O.V.E	13th	11th	11th	Eliminated (Week 3)							
Taye Williams	11th	12th	Eliminated (Week 2)								
Eden Roberts	12th	Eliminated (Week 1)									
Final Showdown	Eden Roberts	Taye Williams	L.O.V.E	Maaka Fiso	Gap5	Tom Batchelor	Gap5	Whenua Patuwai	No bottom two/judges' vote; public votes alone decide who is eliminated		
Final Showdown	L.O.V.E	L.O.V.E	Moorhouse	Gap5	Anna Wilson	Benny Tipene	Cassie Henderson	Cassie Henderson	No bottom two/judges' vote; public votes alone decide who is eliminated		
Bedingfield's vote to eliminate	L.O.V.E	Williams	L.O.V.E	Fiso	Wilson	Batchelor	Gap5	Patuwai	No bottom two/judges' vote; public votes alone decide who is eliminated		
Frost's vote to eliminate	Roberts	L.O.V.E	—N/a	Fiso	Wilson	None (abstained)	Gap5	Henderson	No bottom two/judges' vote; public votes alone decide who is eliminated		
Walker's vote to eliminate	Roberts	L.O.V.E	L.O.V.E	Gap5	Gap5	Batchelor	Gap5	Henderson	No bottom two/judges' vote; public votes alone decide who is eliminated		
Blatt's vote to eliminate	Roberts	Williams	None (abstained)	Fiso	Wilson	Tipene	Henderson	Patuwai	No bottom two/judges' vote; public votes alone decide who is eliminated		
Eliminated	Eden Roberts; 3 of 4 votes Majority	Taye Williams; 2 of 4 votes Deadlock	L.O.V.E; 2 of 2 votes Majority	Fletcher Mills; Public vote to save	Anna Wilson; 3 of 4 votes Majority	Tom Batchelor; 2 of 3 votes Majority	Gap5; 3 of 4 votes Majority	Cassie Henderson; 2 of 4 votes Deadlock	Moorhouse; Public vote to save	Benny Tipene; Public vote to win	Whenua Patuwai; Public vote to win
Eliminated	Eden Roberts; 3 of 4 votes Majority	Taye Williams; 2 of 4 votes Deadlock	L.O.V.E; 2 of 2 votes Majority	Maaka Fiso; 3 of 4 votes Majority	Anna Wilson; 3 of 4 votes Majority	Tom Batchelor; 2 of 3 votes Majority	Gap5; 3 of 4 votes Majority	Cassie Henderson; 2 of 4 votes Deadlock	Moorhouse; Public vote to save	Benny Tipene; Public vote to win	Whenua Patuwai; Public vote to win

=== Live show details ===
==== Week 1 (19/20 May) ====
- Theme: Number-one singles
- Musical guests: Willy Moon ("Yeah Yeah") and Ruby Frost ("Volition")

Acts' performances on the first live show
Act	Category (Mentor)	Order	Song	Result
Gap5	Groups (Blatt)	1	"Hollaback Girl"	Safe
Benny Tipene	Boys (Frost)	2	"Crazy"	Safe
Jackie Thomas	Girls (Bedingfield)	3	"Video Games"	Safe
Taye Williams	Over 25s (Walker)	4	"Breakeven"	Safe
Tom Batchelor	Boys (Frost)	5	"Mercy"	Safe
Eden Roberts	Girls (Bedingfield)	6	"Jolene"	Bottom Two
Whenua Patuwai	Boys (Frost)	7	"Rolling in the Deep"	Safe
Cassie Henderson	Girls (Bedingfield)	8	"I Want You Back"	Safe
Anna Wilson	Over 25s (Walker)	9	"Landslide"	Safe
L.O.V.E	Groups (Blatt)	10	"Rapture"	Bottom Two
Maaka Fiso	Over 25s (Walker)	11	"Titanium"	Safe
Fletcher Mills	Boys (Frost)	12	"Paradise"	Safe
Moorhouse	Groups (Blatt)	13	"Boyfriend"	Safe
Final showdown details
Act	Category (Mentor)	Order	Song	Result
Eden Roberts	Girls (Bedingfield)	1	(original)	Eliminated
L.O.V.E	Groups (Blatt)	2	(original)	Safe

Judges' vote to eliminate

- Bedingfield: L.O.V.E - backed his own act, Eden Roberts.
- Blatt: Eden Roberts - backed her own act, L.O.V.E.
- Frost: Eden Roberts - felt L.O.V.E were more entertaining.
- Walker: Eden Roberts - felt that Roberts had received all the exposure she needed from the show.

However, voting statistics revealed that Roberts received more votes than L.O.V.E, which meant that if Walker sent the result to deadlock, L.O.V.E would have been eliminated.

==== Week 2 (26/27 May) ====
- Theme: New Zealand music
- Musical guests: Annabel Fay ("Warrior") and Smashproof ("Paint Fade")

Acts' performances on the second live show
Act	Category (Mentor)	Order	Song	New Zealand artist	Result
Taye Williams	Over 25s (Walker)	1	"Settle Down"	Kimbra	Bottom Two
L.O.V.E	Groups (Blatt)	2	"How Bizarre" / "Push It" (Note: Judge Mel Blatt explained the inclusion of a song by American rappers Salt-n-Pepa by joking that "Pepa's great-grandmother was [a Kiwi]"."THE X FACTOR episode 11". TV3. Archived from the original on 2013-06-15.)	OMC	Bottom Two
Tom Batchelor	Boys (Frost)	3	"Slice of Heaven"	Dave Dobbyn	Safe
Jackie Thomas	Girls (Bedingfield)	4	"Maybe Tomorrow"	Goldenhorse	Safe
Whenua Patuwai	Boys (Frost)	5	"Bathe In the River"	Mt Preservation Society featuring Hollie Smith	Safe
Anna Wilson	Over 25s (Walker)	6	"Deciphering Me"	Brooke Fraser	Safe
Moorhouse	Groups (Blatt)	7	"Why Does Love Do This To Me"	The Exponents	Safe
Fletcher Mills	Boys (Frost)	8	"Sway"	Bic Runga	Safe
Maaka Fiso	Over 25s (Walker)	9	"Don't Forget Your Roots"	Six60	Safe
Benny Tipene	Boys (Frost)	10	"Not Given Lightly"	Chris Knox	Safe
Gap5	Groups (Blatt)	11	"Royals" / "You're the Voice" (Note: Blatt also explained the inclusion of a song by Australian singer John Farnham by joking that Farnham had "a great grandma or great grandpa who was Kiwi.""THE X FACTOR episode 11". TV3. Archived from the original on 2013-06-15.)	Lorde	Safe
Cassie Henderson	Girls (Bedingfield)	12	"Something in the Water"	Brooke Fraser	Safe
Final showdown details
Act	Category (Mentor)	Order	Song		Result
Taye Williams	Over 25s (Walker)	1	"Forget You"		Eliminated
L.O.V.E	Groups (Blatt)	2	"Swing"		Safe

Judges' vote to eliminate

- Blatt: Taye Williams - backed her own act, L.O.V.E.
- Walker: L.O.V.E - backed his own act, Taye Williams.
- Bedingfield: Taye Williams - gave no reason.
- Frost: L.O.V.E - felt she could see Williams as a recording artist.

With the acts in the bottom two receiving two votes each, the result went to deadlock and reverted to the earlier public vote. Taye Williams was eliminated as the act with the fewest public votes.

==== Week 3 (2/3 June) ====
- Theme: Best of British
- Musical guests: Stan Walker ("Bulletproof") and Joseph & Maia ("Nothing I Can Do")

Acts' performances on the third live show
Act	Category (Mentor)	Order	Song	British Artist	Result
Whenua Patuwai	Boys (Frost)	1	"Somebody to Love"	Queen	Safe
Moorhouse	Groups (Blatt)	2	"Every Breath You Take"	The Police	Bottom Two
Cassie Henderson	Girls (Bedingfield)	3	"Unwritten"	Natasha Bedingfield	Safe
Fletcher Mills	Boys (Frost)	4	"Your Song"	Elton John	Safe
Gap5	Groups (Blatt)	5	"Pure Shores"	All Saints	Safe
Tom Batchelor	Boys (Frost)	6	"Come Together"	The Beatles	Safe
Maaka Fiso	Over 25s (Walker)	7	"The Scientist"	Coldplay	Safe
L.O.V.E	Groups (Blatt)	8	"Pass Out"	Tinie Tempah	Bottom Two
Jackie Thomas	Girls (Bedingfield)	9	"Dreams"	Fleetwood Mac	Safe
Benny Tipene	Boys (Frost)	10	"This Charming Man"	The Smiths	Safe
Anna Wilson	Over 25s (Walker)	11	"Mama Do (Uh Oh, Uh Oh)"	Pixie Lott	Safe
Final showdown details
Act	Category (Mentor)	Order	Song		Result
L.O.V.E	Groups (Blatt)	1	"No Scrubs"		Eliminated
Moorhouse	Groups (Blatt)	2	"With or Without You"		Safe

Judges' vote to eliminate

- Blatt refused to send home either of her acts.
- Walker: L.O.V.E - felt they had a lot of fight in them and would do well after the show.
- Bedingfield: L.O.V.E - felt whatever happened would be good for them.
- Frost was not required to vote since there was already a majority.

==== Week 4 (9/10 June) ====
- Theme: Soul classics
- Musical guests: Titanium ("Tattoo") and Aaradhna ("You Don't Love Me Anymore")
- Two acts were eliminated from the fourth results show.

Acts' performances on the fourth live show
Act	Category (Mentor)	Order	Song	Result
Maaka Fiso	Over 25s (Walker)	1	"Never Too Much"	Bottom Three
Benny Tipene	Boys (Frost)	2	"Sexual Healing"	Safe
Anna Wilson	Over 25s (Walker)	3	"At Last"	Safe
Gap5	Groups (Blatt)	4	"Mr. Big Stuff"	Bottom Three
Whenua Patuwai	Boys (Frost)	5	"When a Man Loves a Woman"	Safe
Tom Batchelor	Boys (Frost)	6	"Feeling Good"	Safe
Cassie Henderson	Girls (Bedingfield)	7	"I Say a Little Prayer"	Safe
Moorhouse	Groups (Blatt)	8	"Ain't Too Proud to Beg"	Safe
Fletcher Mills	Boys (Frost)	9	"Ain't No Sunshine"	Eliminated
Jackie Thomas	Girls (Bedingfield)	10	"Son of a Preacher Man"	Safe
Final showdown details
Act	Category (Mentor)	Order	Song	Result
Maaka Fiso	Over 25s (Walker)	1	"Is This Love"	Eliminated
Gap5	Groups (Blatt)	2	"Turning Tables"	Safe

Judges' vote to eliminate

- Walker: Gap5 - backed his own act, Maaka Fiso.
- Blatt: Maaka Fiso - backed her own act, Gap5.
- Bedingfield: Maaka Fiso - felt Gap5 would sell records.
- Frost: Maaka Fiso - felt Gap5 were better suited to the competition.

However, voting statistics revealed that Fiso received more votes than Gap5, which meant that if Frost sent the result to deadlock, Gap5 would have been eliminated.

==== Week 5 (16/17 June) ====
- Theme: Top 40
- Musical guests: Sons of Zion ("Superman") and Jamie McDell ("Life in Sunshine")

Acts' performances on the fifth live show
Act	Category (Mentor)	Order	Song	Result
Cassie Henderson	Girls (Bedingfield)	1	"Pompeii"	Safe
Moorhouse	Groups (Blatt)	2	"#thatPower"	Safe
Whenua Patuwai	Boys (Frost)	3	"Impossible"	Safe
Anna Wilson	Over 25s (Walker)	4	"Radioactive"	Bottom Two
Benny Tipene	Boys (Frost)	5	"Lost"	Safe
Gap5	Groups (Blatt)	6	"Blurred Lines"	Bottom Two
Jackie Thomas	Girls (Bedingfield)	7	"Stay"	Safe
Tom Batchelor	Boys (Frost)	8	"Ho Hey"	Safe
Final showdown details
Act	Category (Mentor)	Order	Song	Result
Gap5	Groups (Blatt)	1	"No Diggity" / "Thrift Shop"	Safe
Anna Wilson	Over 25s (Walker)	2	"Imagine"	Eliminated

Judges' vote to eliminate

- Blatt: Anna Wilson - backed her own act, Gap5.
- Walker: Gap5 - backed his own act, Anna Wilson.
- Frost: Anna Wilson - felt Wilson did not have a clear identity.
- Bedingfield: Anna Wilson - felt Gap5 had more potential as popstars.

However, voting statistics revealed that Wilson received more votes than Gap5, which meant that if Bedingfield sent the result to deadlock, Gap5 would have been eliminated.

==== Week 6 (23/24 June) ====
- Theme: Songs from movies
- Musical guests: Dane Rumble ("Not Alone") and Reece Mastin ("Rock Star")

Acts' performances on the sixth live show
Act	Category (Mentor)	Order	Song	Movie	Result
Tom Batchelor	Boys (Frost)	1	"All Day and All of the Night"	The Boat That Rocked	Bottom Two
Cassie Henderson	Girls (Bedingfield)	2	"A Thousand Years"	The Twilight Saga: Breaking Dawn – Part 1	Safe
Whenua Patuwai	Boys (Frost)	3	"I Wish"	Happy Feet	Safe
Benny Tipene	Boys (Frost)	4	"Can't Take My Eyes Off You"	10 Things I Hate About You	Bottom Two
Gap5	Groups (Blatt)	5	"Paper Planes"	Slumdog Millionaire	Safe
Jackie Thomas	Girls (Bedingfield)	6	"Lovefool"	Romeo + Juliet	Safe
Moorhouse	Groups (Blatt)	7	"Take It Easy"	Mt. Zion	Safe
Final showdown details
Act	Category (Mentor)	Order	Song		Result
Tom Batchelor	Boys (Frost)	1	"Whole Lotta Love"		Eliminated
Benny Tipene	Boys (Frost)	2	"Can't Help Falling in Love"		Safe

Judges' vote to eliminate

- Frost abstained from voting as both acts were in her category.
- Blatt: Benny Tipene - felt his heart was not in it.
- Bedingfield: Tom Batchelor - gave no reason.
- Walker: Tom Batchelor - gave no reason.

==== Week 7 (30 June/1 July) ====
- Theme: Made in America
- Musical guests: Aotearoa Reggae All Stars ("Sensitive to a Smile") and Manic Street Preachers ("If You Tolerate This Your Children Will Be Next")

Acts' performances on the seventh live show
Act	Category (Mentor)	Order	Song	American Artist	Result
Moorhouse	Groups (Blatt)	1	"OMG"	Usher/will.i.am	Safe
Jackie Thomas	Girls (Bedingfield)	2	"Toxic"	Britney Spears	Safe
Whenua Patuwai	Boys (Frost)	3	"Empire State of Mind"	Jay-Z/Alicia Keys	Safe
Cassie Henderson	Girls (Bedingfield)	4	"Love Story"	Taylor Swift	Bottom Two
Gap5	Groups (Blatt)	5	"Bills, Bills, Bills"/"Independent Women"	Destiny's Child	Bottom Two
Benny Tipene	Boys (Frost)	6	"California"	Phantom Planet	Safe
Final showdown details
Act	Category (Mentor)	Order	Song		Result
Gap5	Groups (Blatt)	1	"Locked Out of Heaven"		Eliminated
Cassie Henderson	Girls (Bedingfield)	2	"The Climb"		Safe

Judges' vote to eliminate

- Blatt: Cassie Henderson - backed her own act, Gap5.
- Bedingfield: Gap5 - backed his own act, Cassie Henderson.
- Frost: Gap5 - felt their recent performances had been unprofessional.
- Walker: Gap5 - felt Henderson still had a lot of potential.

==== Week 8: Quarter-Final (7/8 July) ====
- Theme: Coke Choice (songs from act's year of birth, as chosen by public online vote)
- Musical guests: Daniel Bedingfield ("Every Little Thing") and Timomatic ("Parachute")

===== Coke Choice =====
Songs performed during week eight were chosen by public vote from a shortlist of three songs from the contestant's birth year. Voting was done via The X Factor Facebook page, running from 17 to 29 June.

Key:

– Chosen Song

Act	Category (Mentor)	Birth Year	Option 1	Option 2	Option 3
Cassie Henderson	Girls (Bedingfield)	1998	"Torn"	"I'll Be"	"You're Still the One"
Moorhouse	Groups (Blatt)	1993	"I Swear"	"All For Love"	"When Can I See You"
Whenua Patuwai	Boys (Frost)	1995	"I'll Make Love to You"	"You Are Not Alone"	"Holding on to You"
Jackie Thomas	Girls (Bedingfield)	1990	"Black Velvet"	"Roam"	"It Must Have Been Love"
Benny Tipene	Boys (Frost)	1990	"Free Fallin'"	"Nothing Compares 2 U"	"Another Day in Paradise"

Acts' performances on the eighth live show
Act	Category (Mentor)	Order	Song	Result
Jackie Thomas	Girls (Bedingfield)	1	"Black Velvet"	Safe
Whenua Patuwai	Boys (Frost)	2	"You Are Not Alone"	Bottom Two
Benny Tipene	Boys (Frost)	3	"Free Fallin'"	Safe
Cassie Henderson	Girls (Bedingfield)	4	"Torn"	Bottom Two
Moorhouse	Groups (Blatt)	5	"I Swear"	Safe
Final showdown details
Act	Category (Mentor)	Order	Song	Result
Whenua Patuwai	Boys (Frost)	1	"I Believe I Can Fly"	Safe
Cassie Henderson	Girls (Bedingfield)	2	"Skyscraper"	Eliminated

Judges' vote to eliminate

- Bedingfield: Whenua Patuwai - backed his own act, Cassie Henderson.
- Frost: Cassie Henderson - backed her own act, Whenua Patuwai.
- Walker: Cassie Henderson - gave no reason.
- Blatt: Whenua Patuwai - felt the business would be too harmful for Patuwai.

With the acts in the bottom two receiving two votes each, the result went to deadlock and reverted to the earlier public vote. Cassie Henderson was eliminated as the act with the fewest public votes.

==== Week 9: Semi-Final (14/15 July) ====
- Themes: Love and heartbreak; the best of rock
- Musical guests: Stan Walker ("Inventing Myself") and Ginny Blackmore ("Bones")

Acts' performances on the ninth live show
Act	Category (Mentor)	Love And Heartbreak		The Best Of Rock		Result
Act	Category (Mentor)	Order	Song	Order	Song	Result
Jackie Thomas	Girls (Bedingfield)	1	"Angel"	7	"Wonderwall"	Safe
Benny Tipene	Boys (Frost)	2	"Boxes" (original)	8	"Sweet Child o' Mine"	Safe
Moorhouse	Groups (Blatt)	3	"When I Was Your Man"	5	"Use Somebody"	Eliminated
Whenua Patuwai	Boys (Frost)	4	"If You're Not the One"	6	"Piece of My Heart"	Safe

Notes

- For the first time this series, each act performed two songs.
- The semi-final did not feature a final showdown and instead the act with the fewest public votes, Moorhouse, was automatically eliminated. After their elimination, Moorhouse performed "Mirrors".

==== Week 10: Final (21/22 July) ====
===== 21 July =====
- Themes: Judges' choice; duets

Acts' performances on the Sunday Final
Act	Category (Mentor)	Judges' Choice		Duets	
Act	Category (Mentor)	Order	Song	Order	Song
Jackie Thomas	Girls (Bedingfield)	1	"Next to Me"	5	"Getting Stronger" (with Adeaze)
Whenua Patuwai	Boys (Frost)	2	"I Won't Give Up"	4	"Bathe In the River" (with Hollie Smith)
Benny Tipene	Boys (Frost)	3	"Laura"	6	"Love Love Love" (with Avalanche City)

Notes

- In the duets section, acts duetted with a New Zealand artist, singing a previous hit for that artist.

===== 22 July =====
- Musical guests: The top 13 contestants ("Get Lucky") and Guy Sebastian ("Get Along").

Acts' performances on the Monday Final
Act	Category (Mentor)	Audition Song		Winner's Single		Result	Votes
Act	Category (Mentor)	Order	Song	Order	Song	Result	Votes
Benny Tipene	Boys (Frost)	1	"Hey Ya!"	N/A	N/A (already eliminated)	Eliminated	99,302
Whenua Patuwai	Boys (Frost)	2	"A Change Is Gonna Come"	4	"Something Special"	Runner-Up	197,523
Jackie Thomas	Girls (Bedingfield)	3	"Skinny Love"	5	"It's Worth It"	Winner	257,151

Notes

- For the first time this series there was no theme.

== Ratings ==
The grand final decider episode on Monday 22 July had a cume (cumulative audience) of 1,326,000 viewers in the 5+ demographic and an average audience of 598,100. During the series, 3,285,500 viewers watched the show at some stage.

=== N.Z. Nielsen ratings ===
Colour key:
– Highest rating during the season
– Lowest rating during the season

Ep. #	Episode	Airdate	Timeslot	Average Viewers	Rank (Night)	Time Shifted Viewers	Rank (Night)	Ref
1	Auditions 1	Sunday April 21, 2013	7:00 - 8:30pm	467,360	#4	15,280	#7	
2	Auditions 2	Monday April 22, 2013	7:30 - 8:45pm	449,740	#6	17,480	#9	
3	Auditions 3	Sunday April 28, 2013	7:00 - 8:45pm	446,890	#4	20,360	#5	
4	Auditions 4	Monday April 29, 2013	7:30 - 8:45pm	426,170	#6	27,010	#4	
5	Bootcamp, Part 1	Sunday May 5, 2013	7:00 - 8:40pm	380,110	#4	20,460	#6	
6	Bootcamp, Part 2	Monday May 6, 2013	7:30 - 8:40pm	331,880	#7	19,700	#3	
7	Judges Retreats, Part 1	Sunday May 12, 2013	7:00 - 8:40pm	395,500	#4	33,020	#1	
8	Judges Retreats, Part 2	Monday May 13, 2013	7:30 - 8:40pm	317,010	#10	—N/a	—N/a	
9	Live Show 1	Sunday May 19, 2013	7:00 - 9:20pm	401,840	#4	31,590	#1	
10	Live Results 1	Monday May 20, 2013	8:00 - 9:10pm	384,450	#6	18,990	#6	
11	Live Show 2	Sunday May 26, 2013	7:00 - 9:20pm	456,610	#4	—N/a	—N/a	
12	Live Results 2	Monday May 27, 2013	8:00 - 9:05pm	376,840	#7	—N/a	—N/a	
13	Live Show 3	Sunday June 2, 2013	7:00 - 9:15pm	319,000	#5	—N/a	—N/a	
14	Live Results 3	Monday June 3, 2013	8:00 - 9:05pm	363,980	#6	—N/a	—N/a	
15	Live Show 4	Sunday June 9, 2013	7:00 - 9:15pm	412,850	#3	—N/a	—N/a	
16	Live Results 4	Monday June 10, 2013	8:00 - 9:05pm	396,700	#7	—N/a	—N/a	
17	Live Show 5	Sunday June 16, 2013	7:00 - 8:45pm	473,320	#3	—N/a	—N/a	
18	Live Results 5	Monday June 17, 2013	8:00 - 9:05pm	356,850	#9	—N/a	—N/a	
19	Live Show 6	Sunday June 23, 2013	7:00 - 8:40pm	431,200	#3	—N/a	—N/a	
20	Live Results 6	Monday June 24, 2013	8:00 - 9:05pm	399,070	#7	—N/a	—N/a	
21	Live Show 7	Sunday June 30, 2013	7:00 - 8:30pm	—N/a				
22	Live Results 7	Monday July 1, 2013	8:00 - 9:05pm	402,280	#6	—N/a	—N/a	
23	Live Show 8	Sunday July 7, 2013	7:00 - 8:20pm	397,930	#4	—N/a	—N/a	
24	Live Results 8	Monday July 8, 2013	8:00 - 9:05pm	409,120	#6	—N/a	—N/a	
25	Live Show 9	Sunday July 14, 2013	7:00 - 8:20pm	366,100	#3	—N/a	—N/a	
26	Live Results 9	Monday July 15, 2013	8:00 - 9:05pm	281,440	#12	—N/a	—N/a	
27	Grand Final Performances	Sunday July 21, 2013	7:00 - 8:35pm	453,020	#3	—N/a	—N/a	
28	Grand Final Decider	Monday July 22, 2013	7:35 - 9:40pm	598,100	#2	—N/a	—N/a	
