= Bigger (Stan Walker song) =

Single by Stan Walker
- Released: 31 July 2020
- Length: 2:56
- Label: Sony
- Songwriters: Stan Walker; Ryan Lewis; Ashton Parson; Michael Jade
- Producers: Hugh Lake; Hamley

Stan Walker singles chronology
"Stay" (2020)	"Bigger" (2020)	"Don't Worry Baby" (2021)

"Bigger" is a song by New Zealand singer Stan Walker. It was released as a single through Sony Music Australia on 31 July 2020. "Bigger" peaked at number 25 on the New Zealand Singles Chart.

== Music video ==
The music video, co-directed with Shae Sterling, is a tribute to Walker's home in Tauranga Moana, featuring sweeping scenes of Tamapahore and Mangatawa.

== Track listings ==
- Digital download/streaming
1. "Bigger" – 2:56
2. "Tua" (featuring Ibanez Maeva) – 3:07
- Digital download/streaming
1. "Bigger" (featuring Parson James) – 2:56
- Digital download/streaming
1. "Bigger" (featuring Phi11a) – 3:25

== Charts ==
=== Weekly charts ===
Weekly chart performance for "Bigger"
Chart (2020–2021)	Peak position
New Zealand (Recorded Music NZ)	25

=== Year-end charts ===
2020 year-end chart performance for "Bigger"
Chart (2020)	Position
New Zealand Artist Top 50 Singles (RMNZ)	17

2021 year-end chart performance for "Bigger"
Chart (2021)	Position
New Zealand (Recorded Music NZ)	43

== Certification ==
Region	Certification	Certified units/sales
New Zealand (RMNZ)	4× Platinum	120,000^{‡}
^{‡} Sales+streaming figures based on certification alone.

== Release history ==
Release history for "Bigger"
Country	Date	Format	Label	Version
Various	31 July 2020	Digital download; streaming	Sony Music Australia	Solo version
Various	9 October 2020	Digital download; streaming	Sony Music Australia	featuring Parson James
Various	26 February 2021	Digital download; streaming	Sony Music Australia	featuring Phi11a

== See also ==
- List of number-one Te Reo Māori singles from the 2020s
