= Kapa haka =

Māori performing art

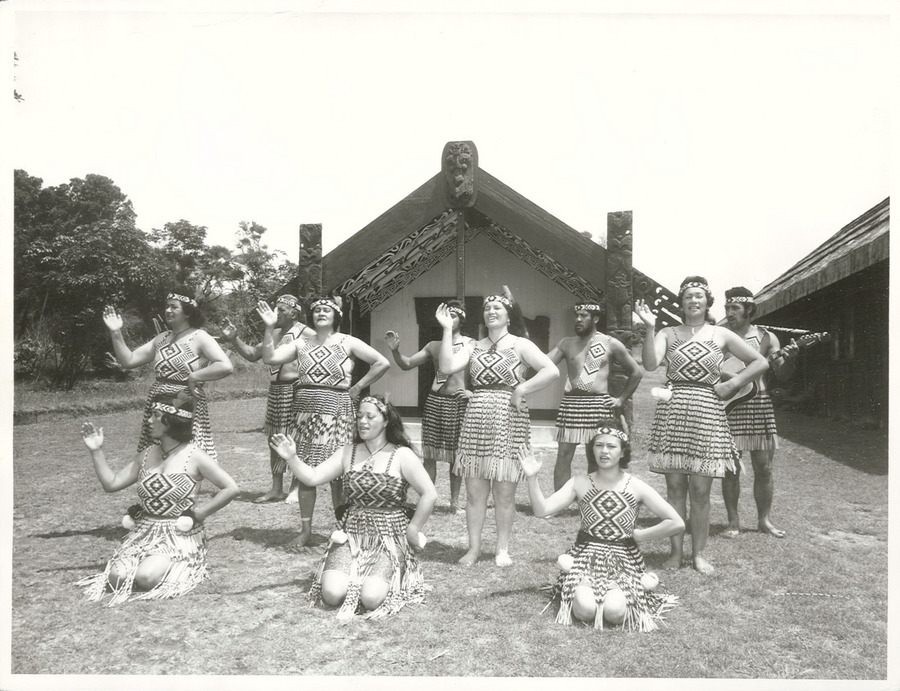
Tairawhiti Society perform action songs at Whakarewarewa Model Village, Rotorua Maori Concert January 1975.

Kapa haka is the term for Māori action songs and the groups who perform them. The phrase translates to 'group' (kapa) 'dance' (haka). Kapa haka is an important avenue for Māori people to express and showcase their heritage and cultural Polynesian identity through song and dance.

Modern kapa haka traces back to pre-European times where it developed from traditional forms of Māori performing art; haka, mau rākau (weaponry), poi (ball attached to rope or string) and mōteatea (traditional Māori songs). There is a regular national kapa haka competition currently called Te Matatini that has been running since 1972.

A kapa haka performance involves choral singing, dance and movements associated with the hand-to-hand combat practised by Māori in mainly precolonial times, presented in a synchronisation of action, timing, posture, footwork and sound. The genre evolved out of a combination of European and Māori musical principles. The current form relates to kapa haka concert groups that first appeared in the 1860s especially in Rotorua to cater to tourists.

== Performance ==
Students at Whakarewarewa School with rākau (c.1900 - c.1947).

The work of a kapa haka consists of the group performance of a suite of songs and dances spanning several types of Māori music and dance, strung together into a coherent whole. Music and dance types that normally appear are waiata tira (warm-up song), whakaeke (entrance song), waiata-ā-ringa (action song), haka (challenge), pou or mōteatea (old-style singing), poi (coordinated swinging of balls attached to cords), and whakawātea (closing song). They may also include tītī tōrea (synchronised manipulation of thin sticks). In a full performance, which can last up to 40 minutes, each music or dance type may appear more than once.

Music for kapa haka is primarily vocal. All song types, with the notable exceptions of mōteatea and haka, are structured around European-style harmony, frequently with guitar accompaniment and acoustics. Spurts of haka-style declamation are woven into the songs, as are dance movements, facial expressions and other bodily and aural signals unique to Māori. Song poetry is completely in Māori and new material is continually being composed.

The sole musical instruments used in kapa haka performances are the guitar, the pūtatara conch shell, the sounds of poi and rākau (see below) and body percussion, especially the stamping of feet.

Every two years, kapa haka performers from all parts of New Zealand compete in Te Matatini, New Zealand's annual, national Māori performing arts competition for adult groups. There is also a national secondary schools kapa haka competition Ngā Kapa Haka Kura Tuarua o Aotearoa that used to be part of Polyfest, where the level of performance is also very high.

== Music and dance styles used by kapa haka ==
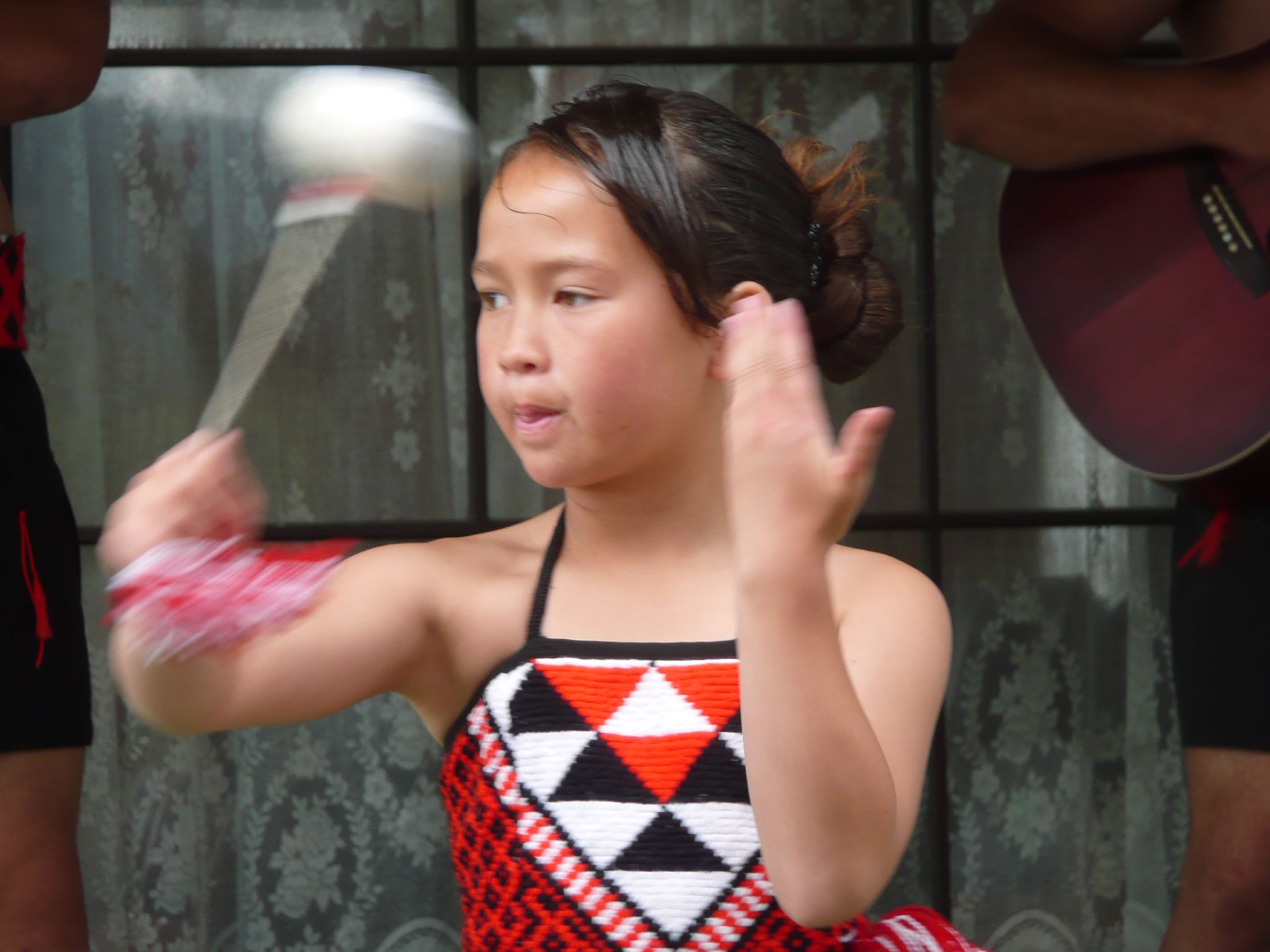
Young Māori girl performing with poi

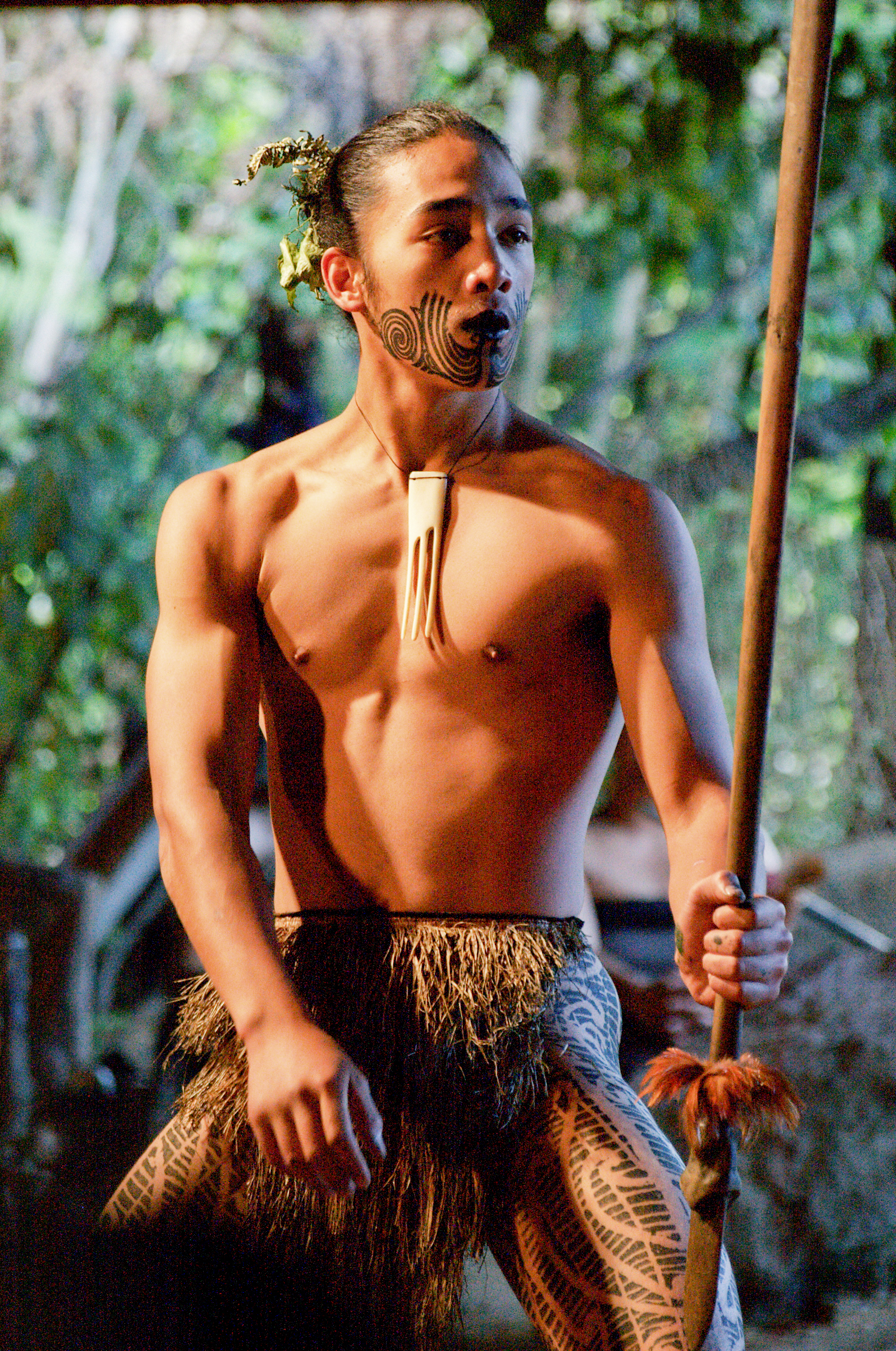
Young Māori man with taiaha performing kapa haka

Kapa haka are mixed groups of anywhere between several and dozens of people, that may or may not wear a costume. These groups comprise individuals linked in some way, be it by extended family group, iwi (tribe), school, or some other association. Performers are largely synchronised, but with men sometimes doing some actions while women do others. A few performers have particular roles, such as the kaitataki (male and female leaders), often moving among the performers to urge them on. Composers, arrangers, choreographers and costume designers also play major roles.

Not all Māori performance types are used by kapa haka. Below are brief descriptions of the ones that usually appear. See Māori music for a wider discussion of Māori music.

- Waiata tira are choral pieces used to warm up the vocal cords and introduce the group to the audience. Through a waiata tira the group announces its arrival in a manner that is generally light and positive.
- Whakaeke are also choral pieces. They are frequently used to comment on a social issue of the day or to commemorate an individual or some element of Māoridom. They may also simply be used as the entrance song to announce the group's arrival.
- Haka are best described as challenges. They are used to make a point, honour someone/something, tell a story or express an emotion. They are performed by both men and women, with the focus on the men in the front and support from the women behind. They are vocal performances involving rhythmic declamation in triple metre and aggressive or challenging facial expressions (pūkana, literally "glaring"), body movements and demeanour. The men make heavy use of foot stamping, body percussion, and grimace in an attempt to appear as menacing as possible. Haka are often described as traditional war dances but in fact had many other uses as well in precolonial Māori society, and have many peaceful uses today.
- Waiata-ā-ringa (literally "song of hands or arms") are "action songs", which means that they display the typical Polynesian practice of embellishing and reinforcing the sung poetry with arm and hand actions. They are performed by men and women with women in the front and men in the back. Some use melodies from common English-language songs with new lyrics in Māori, while others are newly composed, treating a wide variety of topics. They feature the wiri or trembling of the hands to indicate the interface between the mind and the body.
- Poi are women's dances involving the swinging of balls, about the size of tennis balls, attached to cords. Poi's origins lie in the precolonial practice of training with poi to improve agility in battle, but today poi is used to showcase the beauty and gracefulness of the women. Poi were traditionally used by women on long waka voyages as a means of keeping timing of the male paddlers, in the style of a coxswain. This is the reason for the emphasis of the sound of the poi striking the hand. Performers swing the balls in synchrony in a variety of figures and rhythms while simultaneously singing a song (a waiata poi) accompanied by guitar. They demonstrate great dexterity and coordination, particularly with "long poi", with cords up to a metre long, where four poi at once may be manipulated by each performer. Formerly the balls were made of raupō and the cords of flax but today they tend to be made of plastic shopping bag material and yarn. The sound of poi striking the hands is an important part of the musical accompaniment.
- Tītī tōrea are occasionally used by kapa haka. Tītī tōrea are pairs of carved thin sticks about shoulder width manipulated with dextrous wrist and arm work, often simultaneously passed between performers. Like poi, tītī tōrea figures are performed in synchrony and to music (and like poi, their sounds, especially that of the ends hitting the floor together, form a percussive accompaniment); and, also like poi, arose out of a precolonial warrior training technique.
- Pou or mōteatea are unison songs performed in a style reminiscent of precolonial Māori singing. They are an important genre within Māoridom because they tell stories in which historical, genealogical and cultural information is preserved and thus link Māori with their past. Mōteatea come in a variety of forms including laments, lullabies, and songs about revenge, anger, and love.
- Whakawātea are choral pieces used to farewell the audience or make a final point before departing the stage. They may pick up on themes raised in the whakaeke or comment on the event at hand. Performers are often at the side or back of the stage.
