= Whenua Patuwai =

- Born: 13 March 1995 (age 31); Lincoln, Christchurch, New Zealand
- Origin: Christchurch, New Zealand
- Genres: Soul•R&B•Gospel
- Occupation: Singer•songwriter
- Instrument: Guitar•piano
- Years active: 2013–present
- Label: Sony Music New Zealand

Whenua Patuwai (born 13 March 1995) is a New Zealand singer and songwriter renowned for his soulful vocals and emotive performances. He gained national prominence as the runner-up on the inaugural season of The X Factor New Zealand in 2013, where his rendition of Sam Cooke's "A Change Is Gonna Come" captivated audiences. Following the show, Patuwai signed with Sony Music New Zealand and released his debut single, "Something Special", which peaked at number three on the New Zealand Singles Chart. His debut album, The Soul Sessions (2014), featured covers of classic soul tracks and debuted at number four on the New Zealand Albums Chart.

In 2013, Patuwai joined fellow X Factor judge Stan Walker as the opening act on Walker's "World Tour of New Zealand," performing across the country in September and October. Additionally, he opened for Australian singer Guy Sebastian during Sebastian's "Get Along Tour," further establishing his presence in the Australasian music scene.

In recent years, Patuwai has continued to contribute to the New Zealand music scene. Notably, in 2022, he featured on the single "Te Ata Māhina" alongside Te Matatini and Te Pikikōtuku o Ngāti Rongomai. The song achieved significant success, reaching number one on the Te Reo Māori singles chart in April 2023 and becoming the top-performing te reo Māori song in New Zealand for that year.

Patuwai remains active in live performances and collaborations, maintaining a presence in the local music scene through concerts and community events.

== The X Factor ==
Patuwai initially attended the Christchurch pre-audition in January 2013, where he was put through to the judges' auditions in Auckland. At his judges' audition, Patuwai performed the soul classic "A Change Is Gonna Come", eventually progressing to the top 13 in the live shows. In week eight, after a performance of "You Are Not Alone", Patuwai was in the bottom two with Cassie Henderson. The judges vote was deadlocked, with Patuwai saved by the public vote. During the final shows on 21 July, Patuwai duetted with Hollie Smith on the song "Bathe in the River". Patuwai voted was the series runner-up from the audience vote.

== After The X Factor ==
Whenua's single "Something Special" was released digitally on 26 July, with a CD release on 30 July. It debuted at number three in the Official New Zealand Music Chart. Patuwai later performed as the opening act for The X Factor judge Stan Walker on his World Tour of New Zealand tour in September and October 2013.

In June 2014 Patuwai released his debut album, The Soul Sessions, a selection of covers of soul classics. The album was produced by Sam De Jong, brother of Patuwai's The X Factor mentor Ruby Frost, and includes guest vocals from Ria Hall and Troy Kingi. The Soul Sessions debuted and peaked at number four in the New Zealand album charts.

In August 2014, Patuwai featured with other New Zealand artists on the charity single "A Song for Everyone".

== Discography ==
=== Albums ===
Title	Album details	Peak chart positions
Title	Album details	NZ
The Soul Sessions	Released: 27 June 2014; Label: Sony Music New Zealand; Format: CD, digital download	4

=== Singles ===
Year	Title	Peak chart positions	Album
Year	Title	NZ	Album
2013	"Something Special"	3	Non-album single

==== As featured artist ====
Year	Title	Peak chart positions	Album
Year	Title	NZ Artists	Album
2014	"Song For Everyone" (as part of All Star Cast)	5	Non-album single
2022	"Te Ata Māhina" (Te Matatini and Te Pikikōtuku o Ngāti Rongomai featuring Whenua Patuwai)	—	He Tau Makuru
