= Te Matatini =

Biennial performing arts festival in New Zealand

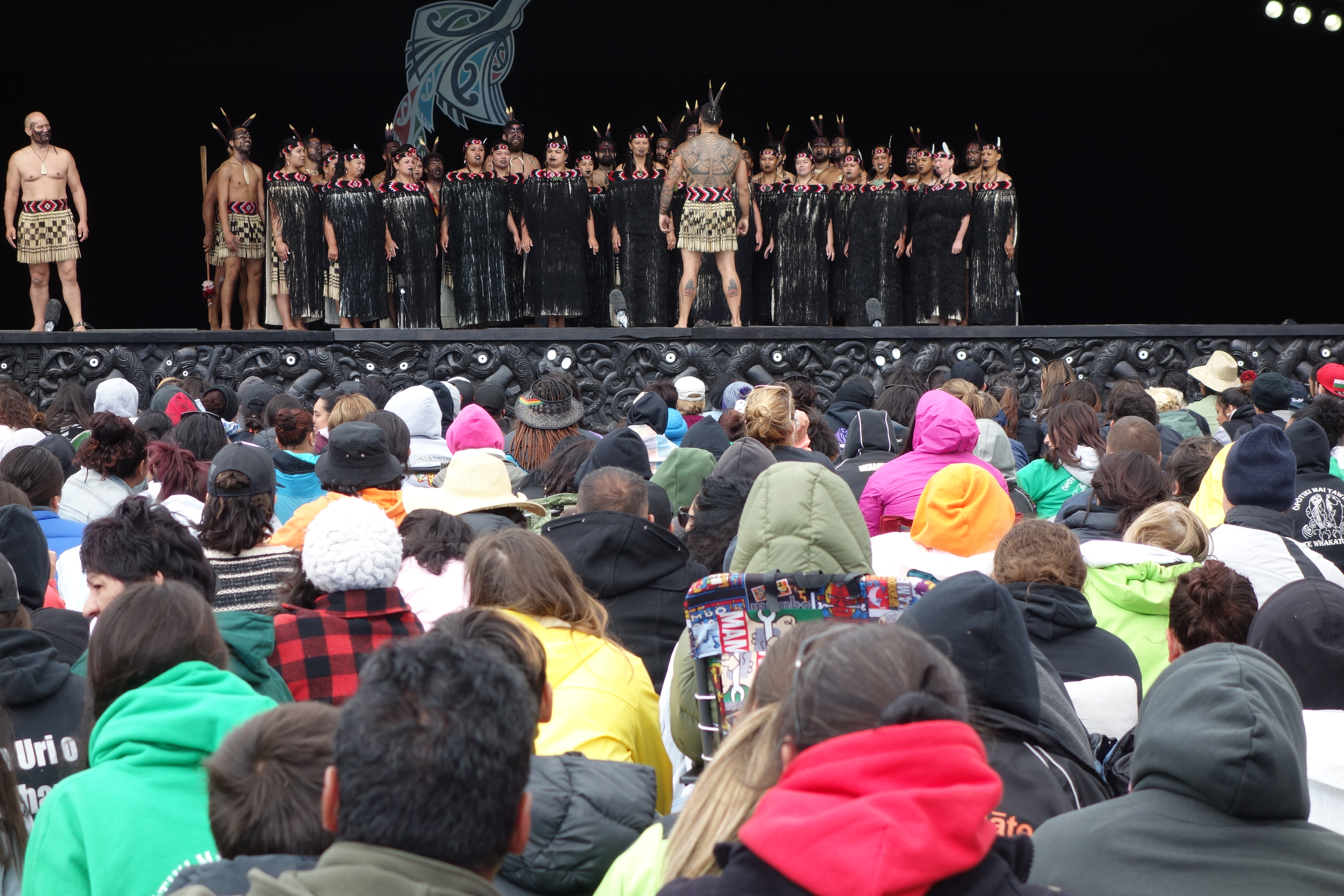
Te Matatini in 2015 in Hagley Park, Christchurch

Te Matatini is a nationwide Māori performing arts festival and competition for kapa haka performers from all of New Zealand and Australia. The name was given by Professor Wharehuia Milroy, a composite of mata meaning "face" and tini denoting "many", therefore the meaning of Te Matatini is "the many faces".

The Te Matatini festival is held every two years in different regions of New Zealand. Authority (mana) is given to different tribes (iwi) to host the festival. For example, in 2017 the mana was given to Te Whanganui-a-Tara on behalf of the Ngāti Kahungunu (Heretaunga) region.

Mead (2003) explains: Mana is undergone by a set of rules before it is given, the people or person in charge has to accept these constraints and strive to rise above them in order to do the job that is set before them.

Te Matatini celebrates the Māori culture, its beauty, and its core values. Kapa haka is a form of Māori identity and contributes to New Zealand being unique.

The Te Matatini Society is the driving force behind Te Matatini National Kapa Haka Festival. Initially emerging in the late 1960s, it has evolved into the sponsor of a variety of Māori festivals and Polynesian events. The society in its current form was established in 1972 and has focused on the long term nurturing of Māori performing arts.

The most recent kapa haka competition, Te Matatini 2025, was held in New Plymouth at the Bowl of Brooklands from 25 February to 1 March 2025, hosted by Te Kāhui Maunga, the Taranaki/Whanganui regional authority.

== Regions ==
Region (rohe)	Delegate	Committee	Chairperson
Te Tai Tokerau	Thomas Strickland	Waitangi Cultural Society Inc	Ropata Diamond
Tāmaki Makaurau	Annette Wehi	Tāmaki Makaurau Senior Kapa Haka Society Inc	Paora Sharples
Tainui	Paraone Gloyne	Tainui Waka Cultural Trust	N/A
Mataatua	Te Kahautu Maxwell	Mataatua Kapa Haka Inc	Te Kahautu Maxwell
Te Arawa	Dan Vaka	Te Arawa Charitable Trust	N/A
Te Tairāwhiti	Maui Tangohau	Tairāwhiti Cultural Development Trust Inc	N/A
Ngāti Kahungunu	Hira Huata	Ngāti Kahungunu Rūnanga Arts & Culture Board	N/A
Te Kāhui Maunga (formerly Aotea)	Rawiri Tinirau	Te Kāhui Maunga Regional Kapa Haka Committee	N/A
Rangitāne	Chris Whaiapu	Rangitāne Māori Cultural Arts Society Inc	N/A
Te Whanganui ā Tara	Te Teira Davis	Wellington Māori Cultural Society	N/A
Te Tau Ihu	Tom Alesana	Te Tau Ihu o Te Waka a Maui Māori Culture Council	N/A
Waitaha	Junior Tana	Ngā Pākihi Whakatekateka o Waitaha Cultural Council	N/A
Te Whenua Moemoeā (Australia)	Ihaka Cotter	Ngā Kapa Taumata Teitei (Māori Performing Arts Australia) Inc	N/A

== Schedule of events ==
Day	Events	Explanation
1	Pōwhiri by local hosts (tangata whenua)	All kapa haka performers, supporters, dignitaries and visitors are welcomed by the local hosts.
2 - 4	Pool Rounds	
5	The Finals (Te Matangirua)	The finalists are judged anew to determine third, second and the new Toa Whakaihuwaka (overall winner of the competition)

== Prizes ==
Prizes are awarded on the final competition day. Across the five days, each team are judged against set criteria, by expert judges, appointed from around New Zealand.

- The taonga (trophies) are awarded to the teams with the highest score in the seven compulsory (aggregate) and non-compulsory (non-aggregate) disciplines from the pool rounds.
- The toa whakaihuwaka (overall winner) taonga is awarded to the team with the highest scores from the final day (Te Matangirua) and also determines first second and third place.

== Disciplines ==
The performances are made up of different disciplines and each haka group is required to perform six disciplines within their performance piece or bracket - whakaeke (a choreographed entry), mōteatea (traditional chant), poi (light ball swung on the end of a rope), waiata-ā-ringa (action song), haka and whakawātea (exit). They must perfect every discipline in a polished 25-minute performance.

Discipline	Explanation
Waiata tira (optional)	The choral is used to warm up the group or is good to put rangimarie (peace) upon the group to settle nerves. This item is optional and not compulsory.
Whakaeke (entrance song)	This is where groups can make a statement in which who they are, where they come from, what the purpose is. It involves a lot of movement and choreography around the stage and involves much discipline.
Mōteatea	The mōteatea is a traditional chant or dirge, however, there are more contemporary styles being used in the more present times.
Waiata-ā-ringa	The action song is where performers are using hand and body actions, much emphasis is placed on the hands, face, body and eyes to combine actions to words of the song. Ngata & Armstrong (2002) state that, “the action song is not a series of drill movements but a rhythmic expression of moods and emotions” (p. 9).
Poi	The poi is an item that is done mostly by women, but can be done by men. This item is known for its gracefulness and poise, utilising a poi (round ball) connected to a plaited cord that exhibits beauty and style.
Haka	Tānerore, "the offspring of Te Rā and Hineraumati gave the personification of hot quivering air, who danced in the summer heat, which was known as Te Haka a Tānerore (the haka of Tanerore" (Reed, 2004, p. 399). The haka is also used to make a statement against political matters, issues in Māori society, and barriers and challenges that Māori face today. It is also known as an expression of New Zealand identity. Karetu (1993) states that "of the Māori dance repertoire it can be said that the haka is the most eagerly anticipated wherever there is a performance" (pg. 80).
Whakawātea	The item is the exit song for the group. This gives the group the opportunity to leave a final statement, and reinforce what they came to do, who they are and thank the tangata whenua ‘home people’ for hosting the event.
Te Reo	Also known as the Māori language, this discipline is the pinnacle of all disciplines.
Manukura Wahine/Manukura Tāne or Kaitataki Wahine/Kaitataki Tāne	Female and male leaders where both show their roles from on and off the stage. These include; karanga (the calling), mihimihi (speeches), how the leaders present themselves within their groups in terms of leadership and how they carry themselves for the group.
Kākahu	This is the dress form, groups are judged on dress style. This item recognises the skills of weavers, moko and tuhi kiri (tattoo) artists, and carvers.

== Past winners ==
Year	Roopu (Group)	Location
2025	Te Kapa Haka o Ngāti Whakaue	Te Kāhui Maunga (New Plymouth)
2023	Te Kapa Haka o Te Whānau-ā-Apanui	Tāmaki Makaurau (Auckland)
2019	Ngā Tūmanako	Te Whanganui-a-Tara (Wellington)
2017	Whāngārā-mai-Tawhiti	Heretaunga (Hastings)
2015	Te Kapa Haka o Te Whānau-ā-Apanui	Ōtautahi (Christchurch)
2013	Te Waka Huia	Te Arawa (Rotorua)
2011	Te Mātārae i Ōrehu	Te Tairāwhiti (Gisborne)
2009	Te Waka Huia	Tauranga Moana/Mataatua (Mt. Maunganui)
2007	Whangarā Mai Tawhiti	Rangitāne (Palmerston North)
2005	Te Kapa Haka o Te Whanau-a-Apanui	Rangitāne (Palmerston North)
2002	Waihirere	Tāmaki Makaurau (Auckland)
2000	Te Mātārae i Ōrehu	Tainui (Ngāruawāhia)
1998	Waihirere	Te Whanganui-a-Tara (Upper Hutt)
1996	Ngāti Rangiwewehi	Te Arawa (Rotorua)
1994	Te Waka Huia	Hāwera (Taranaki)
1992	Te Waka Huia	Tainui (Ngāruawāhia)
1990	Te Roopu Manutaki	Te Tai Tokerau (Waitangi)
1988	Waihirere	Te Tai Tokerau (Whangārei)
1986	Te Waka Huia	Ōtautahi (Christchurch)
1983	Ngāti Rangiwewehi	Heretaunga (Hastings)
1981	Taniwharau	Tāmaki Makaurau (Auckland)
1979	Waihirere	Te Tairāwhiti (Gisborne)
1977	Te Kotahitanga o Waitaha	Waitaha (Christchurch)
1975	Te Roopu Manutaki	Te Tai Tokerau (Whangārei)
1973	Mawai Hakona	Te Arawa (Rotorua)
1972	Waihirere	Te Tairawhiti (Gisborne)
