= Official Aotearoa Music Charts =

New Zealand record chart

The Official Aotearoa Music Charts, formerly the Official New Zealand Music Chart (Māori: Te Papa Tātai Waiata Matua o Aotearoa), is the weekly New Zealand top 40 singles and albums charts, issued weekly by Recorded Music NZ (formerly Recording Industry Association of New Zealand). The Music Chart also includes the top 40 Hot Singles chart, the top 20 New Zealand artist singles and albums, the top 20 Hot New Zealand singles, and top 10 compilation albums. All charts are compiled from data of both physical and digital sales from music retailers in New Zealand.

The chart also publishes gold and platinum certifications of albums and singles, according to thresholds set by Recorded Music NZ, through the database on radioscope.net.nz.

== Methodology ==
The singles chart is currently sales and streaming data of songs. In June 2014 it was announced that the chart would also include streaming; this took effect for the chart published 7 November 2014 and dated 10 November 2014. Previously airplay was factored into the chart methodology as well.

== History ==
Before 1975, music charts in New Zealand had been regionally compiled by magazines, record stores, and radio stations on an ad hoc basis. This often occurred at different times which made chart compiling complex, and even then only singles were counted.

From May 1975 to 2004, RIANZ published a nationwide annual ranking chart of singles and albums released in New Zealand. Position was awarded by a simple scoring system whereby a number one in one week gets 50 points, a number two gets 49 points and so on, then all weeks are added together. From 2004 onwards, however, the annual charts have songs positioned based on the number of sales for that year.

From April 2007 to October 2011, the charts were displayed and archived at the website radioscope.net.nz which listed 13 different charts, most notably RadioScope100 and NZ40 Airplay Chart. In November 2011, RIANZ launched an updated chart website. The new Chart website also provides the ability to listen to song previews, view music videos, and buy tracks and albums.

On 19 June 2021, a new chart was launched for the top ten songs in te reo Māori, for songs with at least 70% of vocals in Māori.

== Additional charts ==
=== Aotearoa charts ===
In addition to the main Top 40 Singles and Top 40 Albums charts ranking the top forty singles and albums by all artists, on 28 October 2011 Recorded Music NZ began publishing the Top 20 New Zealand Singles and Top 20 New Zealand Albums charts, which ranked the top twenty singles and albums by New Zealand artists only. They are currently named the Top 20 Aotearoa Singles and Top 20 Aotearoa Albums charts.

=== Heatseekers chart ===
An additional "Heatseekers" chart was first published on the chart dated 5 October 2015. The chart consisted of the top ten singles outside of (and that had not previously charted inside) the top forty, and had the same rules and criteria as the Top 40 Singles Chart. Once a title made an appearance inside the top forty at any point, it became ineligible to appear on the Heatseekers chart.

=== Hot Singles chart ===
Following the discontinuation of the Heatseekers chart, in July 2018 Recorded Music NZ began publishing the Hot Singles Chart, which tracks the "40 fastest-moving tracks by sales, streams and airplay". Songs can appear on both the NZ Top 40 and NZ Hot Singles charts simultaneously, as the primary aim of the Hot Singles chart is to "reflect the songs achieving the greatest week-on-week growth".

=== Te Reo Māori singles chart ===
In mid-June 2021, Recorded Music NZ began publishing Te Reo Māori O Te Rārangi 10 O Runga chart, also known as the Top 10 Te Reo Māori Singles, which tracks songs at are at least 70% sung in Te Reo Māori using sales, streaming and airplay data.

=== Catalogue charts ===
In April 2023, Recorded Music NZ began publishing the Official Catalogue Singles chart, the Official Catalogue Albums chart, the Official Aotearoa Catalogue Singles chart, and the Official Aotearoa Catalogue Albums chart. Once a release reaches 18 consecutive months since its first charts appearance, it is no longer eligible and therefore moves into the relevant catalogue chart.

== Lists of number-ones ==
=== Weekly charts ===
==== Singles ====
1960s

- 1960
- 1961
- 1962
- 1963
- 1964
- 1966
- 1967
- 1968
- 1969

1970s

- 1970
- 1971
- 1972
- 1973
- 1974
- 1975
- 1976
- 1977
- 1978
- 1979

1980s–2020s

- 1980s
- 1990s
- 2000s
- 2010s
- 2020s

==== Albums ====
- 1970s
- 1980s
- 1990s
- 2000s
- 2010s
- 2020s

==== Compilations ====
- 1960s
- 1990s
- 2000s
- 2010s

=== Annual charts ===
==== Singles ====
1970s

- 1975
- 1976
- 1977
- 1978
- 1979

1980s

- 1980
- 1981
- 1982
- 1983
- 1984
- 1985
- 1986
- 1987
- 1988
- 1989

1990s

- 1990
- 1991
- 1992
- 1993
- 1994
- 1995
- 1996
- 1997
- 1998
- 1999

2000s

- 2000
- 2001
- 2002
- 2003
- 2004
- 2005
- 2006
- 2007
- 2008
- 2009

2010s

- 2010
- 2011
- 2012
- 2013
- 2014
- 2015
- 2016
- 2017
- 2018
- 2019

2020s

- 2020
- 2021
- 2022
- 2023
- 2024
- 2025

==== Albums ====
1990s

- 1998
- 1999

2000s

- 2000
- 2001
- 2002
- 2003
- 2004
- 2005
- 2006
- 2007
- 2008
- 2009

2010s

- 2010
- 2011
- 2012
- 2013
- 2014
- 2015
- 2016
- 2017
- 2018
- 2019

2020s

- 2020
- 2021
- 2022
- 2023
- 2024
- 2025

== 40th anniversary ==
In May 2015, Recorded Music NZ celebrated the 40th anniversary of the Official NZ Top 40 Music Charts. An event was held at Vector Arena in Auckland and featured performances from 16 artists from New Zealand and overseas who had previously achieved various chart milestones, including most number ones, most chart entries, most weeks in the chart and most weeks at number one.

As part of the celebrations, a limited edition single pressed on red vinyl was released, with Tiki Taane's song "Always on my Mind" (the New Zealand track to spend the most weeks - 55 - in the singles chart) and Scribe's song "Stand Up" (the New Zealand single to spend the most weeks - 12 - at number one).

The following chart achievements were noted:

Singles

- Most No.1 singles: The Beatles have fourteen as a band, Justin Bieber with twelve, and Katy Perry with nine No.1 singles respectively
- Most No.1 singles (NZ): Deep Obsession, 3 no. 1 singles
- Most chart entries: Madonna, 53 entries
- Most chart entries (NZ): Shihad, 25 entries
- Most weeks in chart: New Order "Blue Monday", 74 weeks
- Most weeks in chart (NZ): Tiki Taane "Always On My Mind", 55 weeks

Albums

- Most No. 1 albums: Taylor Swift, 15 no.1 albums
- Most No. 1 albums (NZ): Local Act: Hayley Westenra, and Shihad, five no.1 albums each
- Most chart entries: Elton John, 35 entries
- Most chart entries (NZ): Split Enz, 14 entries
- Most weeks in chart: Pink Floyd The Dark Side of the Moon, 297 weeks
- Most weeks in chart (NZ): Fat Freddy's Drop Based on a True Story, 108 weeks
- Most weeks at No.1: Adele 21, 28 weeks
- Most weeks at No.1 (NZ): Hayley Westenra Pure, 19 weeks

== Certifications ==
Gold and Platinum certifications are awarded once a release hits the qualifying thresholds, which are based on chart-eligible retail sales and paid stream equivalent data.

From June 2016, the method of determining certifications was changed to a points-based system based on a combination of physical sales, digital sales and online streams. For singles, 175 streams is considered equal to one sale. For albums, the Stream Equivalent Album (SEA) system is used.

A single qualifies for gold certification if it exceeds 15,000 points and platinum certification if it exceeds 30,000 points. An album qualifies for gold certification if it exceeds 7500 points and platinum certification if it exceeds 15,000 points. wholesale sales to retailers. For music DVDs (formerly videos), a gold accreditation represents 2,500 copies shipped, with a platinum accreditation representing 5,000 units shipped.

Thresholds for Recorded Music NZ accreditations, by format
| Format / product | Gold | Platinum |
|---|---|---|
| Singles | 15,000 | 30,000 |
| Albums | 7,500 | 15,000 |
| Music DVDs | 2,500 | 5,000 |

== Chart records ==
=== Artists with the most number-one hits ===
These totals include singles when the artist is 'featured'—that is, not the main artist.

‡ – The Beatles' 14 chart placings predate the Official New Zealand Music Chart which began in May 1975.

| Artist | Number-one singles | Longest run | Total weeks at number one |
|---|---|---|---|
| The Beatles | 14 ‡ | "Hey Jude" (5 weeks) | 31 |
| Justin Bieber | 12 | "Despacito (Remix)" (13 weeks) | 62 |
| Taylor Swift | 10 | "Shake It Off", "Look What You Made Me Do", "Anti-Hero", "The Fate of Ophelia" (2 weeks each) | 13 |
| Katy Perry | 9 | "Roar" (11 weeks) | 30 |
| Michael Jackson | 8 | "Beat It", "Black or White" (5 weeks each) | 28 |
| U2 | 8 | "One Tree Hill" (6 weeks) | 23 |
| Rihanna | 8 | "We Found Love" (9 weeks) | 33 |
| Mariah Carey | 8 | "I'll Be There", "Endless Love" (5 weeks each) | 22 |
| Eminem | 8 | "Without Me" (7 weeks) | 30 |
| Akon | 7 | "Moonshine" (7 weeks) | 23 |
| Bee Gees | 7 | "Tragedy" (6 weeks) | 17 |
| Ariana Grande | 7 | "Thank U, Next" (6 weeks) | 20 |
| Post Malone | 7 | "Rockstar" (8 weeks) | 16 |
| Beyoncé | 6 | “Sweet Dreams, “Texas Hold 'Em” (3 weeks) | 13 |
| Chris Brown | 6 | "Forever" (8 weeks) | 26 |
| The Black Eyed Peas | 6 | "I Gotta Feeling" (9 weeks) | 20 |
| ABBA | 6 | "Fernando" (9 weeks) | 17 |
| Kanye West | 6 | "Knock You Down" (6 weeks) | 16 |

=== New Zealand artists with the most number-one hits ===
These totals includes singles when the artist is 'featured'—that is, not the main artist.

† – includes duet or collaboration by two New Zealand artists.
‡ – includes songs whose chart placings predate the Official New Zealand Music Chart which began in May 1975.

| Artist | Number-one singles | Longest run | Total weeks at number one |
|---|---|---|---|
| Scribe | 4 | "Stand Up"/"Not Many" (12 weeks) † | 20 |
| Lorde | 4 | "Royals" (3 weeks) | 6 |
| John Rowles | 3 ‡ | "Tania" (4 weeks) | 6 |
| Mr. Lee Grant | 3 ‡ | "Thanks To You" (3 weeks) | 6 |
| Deep Obsession | 3 | "Lost in Love", "One & Only" (2 weeks each) | 5 |
| Savage | 3 | "Moonshine" (7 weeks) | 17 |
| Jon Stevens | 2 | "Jezebel" (5 weeks) | 7 |
| Mark Williams | 2 | "It Doesn't Matter Anymore" (4 weeks) | 7 |
| Stan Walker | 2 | "Black Box" (6 weeks) † | 7 |
| P-Money | 2 | "Stop the Music", "Everything" (3 weeks each) † | 6 |
| 3 The Hard Way | 2 | "Hip Hop Holiday" (3 weeks) | 4 |
| Avalanche City | 2 | "Love Love Love" (3 weeks) | 4 |
| L.A.B. | 2 | "In the Air" (3 weeks) | 4 |
| Ginny Blackmore | 2 | "Bones", "Holding You" (1 week each) † | 2 |
| Tex Pistol | 2 | "Game of Love", "Nobody Else" (1 week each) | 2 |

=== Singles with most weeks at number one ===
Key
† – Song of New Zealand origin (Note: Whether or not a song is of New Zealand origin is determined by Recorded Music New Zealand)
Songs denoted with an asterisk (*) spent non-consecutive weeks at number one

| Year | Artist | Song | Total weeks at number one |
|---|---|---|---|
| 2025/2026 | Olivia Dean | "Man I Need" * | 33 |
| 2026 | Ella Langley | "Choosin' Texas" * | 20 |
| 2014 | Pharrell Williams | "Happy" * | 15 |
| 2025 | Alex Warren | "Ordinary" * | 15 |
| 1978 | Boney M. | "Rivers of Babylon" | 14 |
| 1992/1993 | Whitney Houston | "I Will Always Love You" | 14 |
| 2016 | Drake featuring Wizkid and Kyla | "One Dance" | 13 |
| 2017 | Ed Sheeran | "Shape of You" * | 13 |
| 2017 | Luis Fonsi and Daddy Yankee featuring Justin Bieber | "Despacito (Remix)" | 13 |
| 1975 | Freddy Fender | "Wasted Days and Wasted Nights" * | 12 |
| 2003 | Scribe (New Zealand) | "Stand Up/Not Many" * | 12 |
| 2019 | Lil Nas X feat. Billy Ray Cyrus | "Old Town Road (Remix)" | 12 |
| 1993 | UB40 | "Can't Help Falling in Love" * | 11 |
| 2005 | Crazy Frog | "Axel F" * | 11 |
| 2009 | Smashproof featuring Gin Wigmore (New Zealand) | "Brother" | 11 |
| 2011 | LMFAO feat. Lauren Bennett & GoonRock | "Party Rock Anthem" | 11 |
| 2013 | Robin Thicke feat. Pharrell Williams & T.I. | "Blurred Lines" * | 11 |
| 2013 | Katy Perry | "Roar" | 11 |
| 2019/2020 | Tones and I | "Dance Monkey" * | 11 |
| 2021 | The Kid Laroi and Justin Bieber | "Stay" * | 11 |
| 2024 | Rosé and Bruno Mars | "Apt." * | 11 |
| 1973 | Tony Orlando & Dawn | "Tie a Yellow Ribbon Round the Ole Oak Tree" | 10 |
| 1976 | Pussycat | "Mississippi" | 10 |
| 2002/2003 | Las Ketchup | "The Ketchup Song (Aserejé)" | 10 |
| 2008 | Lady Gaga | "Poker Face" | 10 |
| 2009/2010 | Stan Walker (New Zealand) | "Black Box" | 10 |
| 2015/2016 | Justin Bieber | "Love Yourself" | 10 |
| 2023 | Doja Cat | "Paint the Town Red" | 10 |
| 2023/2024 | Jack Harlow | "Lovin on Me" | 10 |
| 1976 | ABBA | "Fernando" * | 9 |
| 1976 | Elton John and Kiki Dee | "Don't Go Breaking My Heart" * | 9 |
| 1986 | All of Us (New Zealand) | "Sailing Away" | 9 |
| 1995 | Coolio featuring L.V. | "Gangsta's Paradise" * | 9 |
| 2002 | Avril Lavigne | "Complicated" | 9 |
| 2009 | The Black Eyed Peas | "I Gotta Feeling" | 9 |
| 2011 | Rihanna featuring Calvin Harris | "We Found Love" | 9 |
| 2012/2013 | Macklemore & Ryan Lewis featuring Wanz | "Thrift Shop" | 9 |
| 2014/2015 | Mark Ronson featuring Bruno Mars | "Uptown Funk" | 9 |
| 2018 | Drake | "God's Plan" | 9 |
| 2022 | Luude featuring Colin Hay | "Down Under" | 9 |
| 2023 | Dave and Central Cee | "Sprinter" * | 9 |
| 2024 | Lady Gaga and Bruno Mars | "Die with a Smile" | 9 |

== List of certified albums ==
The following is a list of albums that have been certified by the Recorded Music NZ for ten platinum or more

=== Ten times ===
- 1989
- Beautiful Collision
- Metallica

=== Eleven times ===
- Come Away with Me
- Greatest Hits
- I Dreamed a Dream

=== Twelve times ===
- Christmas
- Falling into You
- The Phantom of the Opera (1986 musical)
- Pure
- Thriller

=== Thirteen times ===
- 21
- Rumours

=== Fourteen times ===
- The Joshua Tree
- The Wall

=== Fifteen times ===
- 1

=== Sixteen times ===
- Gold: Greatest Hits
- The Dark Side of the Moon

=== Seventeen times ===
- ÷
- Bat Out of Hell
- Born in the U.S.A.

=== Twenty times ===
- Legend

=== Twenty one times ===
- Come On Over

=== Twenty four times ===
- Brothers in Arms
- The Best of ABBA

== See also ==
- List of number-one singles in New Zealand by New Zealand artists
- List of number-one albums in New Zealand by New Zealand artists
- List of best-selling albums in New Zealand

== Bibliography ==
- Scapolo, Dean (2007). "Introduction". The Complete New Zealand Music Charts: 1966 – 2006. Maurienne House. ISBN 978-1-877443-00-8.
