= New Zealand top 50 albums of 2007 =

This is a list of the top-selling albums in New Zealand for 2007 from the Official New Zealand Music Chart's end-of-year chart, compiled by Recorded Music NZ.

== Chart ==
Key
‡ – Album of New Zealand origin

Rank	Artist	Title
1	Led Zeppelin	Mothership
2	Paul Potts	One Chance
3	Eagles	Long Road Out of Eden
4	Hayley Westenra	Treasure^{‡}
5	Linkin Park	Minutes to Midnight
6	Justin Timberlake	FutureSex/LoveSounds
7	Timbaland	Shock Value
8	Brooke Fraser	Albertine^{‡}
9	Various	Outrageous Fortune: Westside Rules^{‡}
10	Pink	I'm Not Dead
11	Traveling Wilburys	The Traveling Wilburys Collection
12	Fall Out Boy	Infinity on High
13	Hollie Smith	Long Player^{‡}
14	High School Musical 2 cast	High School Musical 2 OST
15	Opshop	Second Hand Planet^{‡}
16	Foo Fighters	Echoes, Silence, Patience & Grace
17	Akon	Konvicted
18	Nelly Furtado	Loose
19	Luciano Pavarotti	Forever
20	Prince Tui Teka	The Man, The Legend^{‡}
21	James Blunt	All the Lost Souls
22	Andrea Bocelli	The Best of Andrea Bocelli: Vivere
23	Gwen Stefani	The Sweet Escape
24	Matchbox Twenty	Because of the Times
25	Kings of Leon	Because Of The Times
26	Snow Patrol	Eyes Open
27	My Chemical Romance	The Black Parade
28	Fergie	The Dutchess
29	Amy Winehouse	Back to Black
30	Will Martin	A New World^{‡}
31	Mika	Life in Cartoon Motion
32	Red Hot Chili Peppers	Stadium Arcadium
33	Avril Lavigne	The Best Damn Thing
34	The Fray	How to Save a Life
35	Norah Jones	Not Too Late
36	Rihanna	Good Girl Gone Bad
37	U2	U218 Singles
38	Elvis Presley	Elvis the King
39	JJ Cale and Eric Clapton	The Road to Escondido
40	Santana	Ultimate Santana
41	ABBA	Number Ones
42	Hinder	Extreme Behavior
43	Christina Aguilera	Back To Basics
44	Sean Kingston	Sean Kingston
45	The Killers	Sam's Town
46	Fat Freddy's Drop	Based on a True Story^{‡}
47	Muse	Black Holes and Revelations
48	Katchafire	Say What You're Thinking^{‡}
49	Kora	Kora^{‡}
50	Anika Moa	In Swings the Tide^{‡}
