= New Zealand top 50 albums of 2023 =

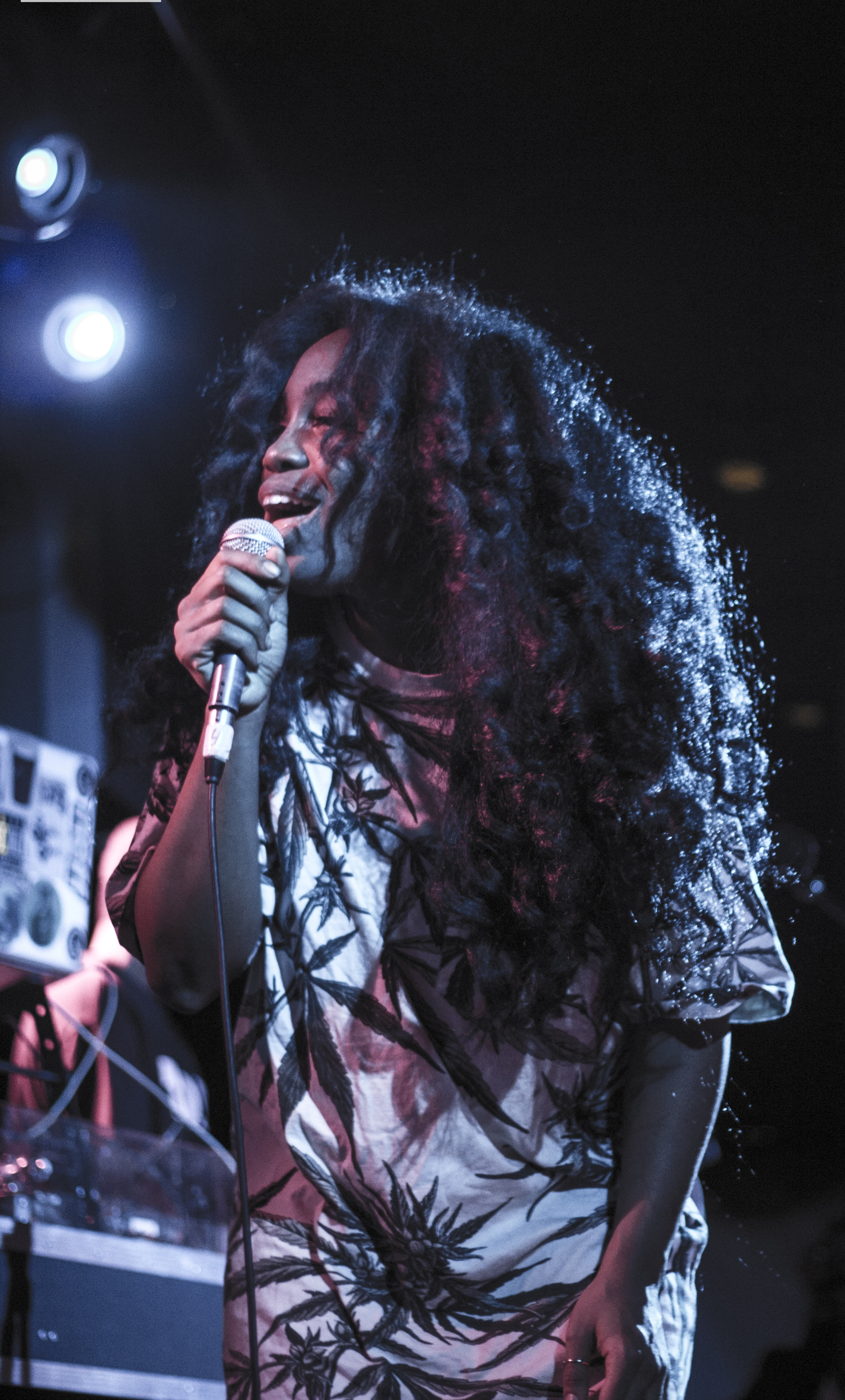
American singer SZA released the top performing album of the year, SOS

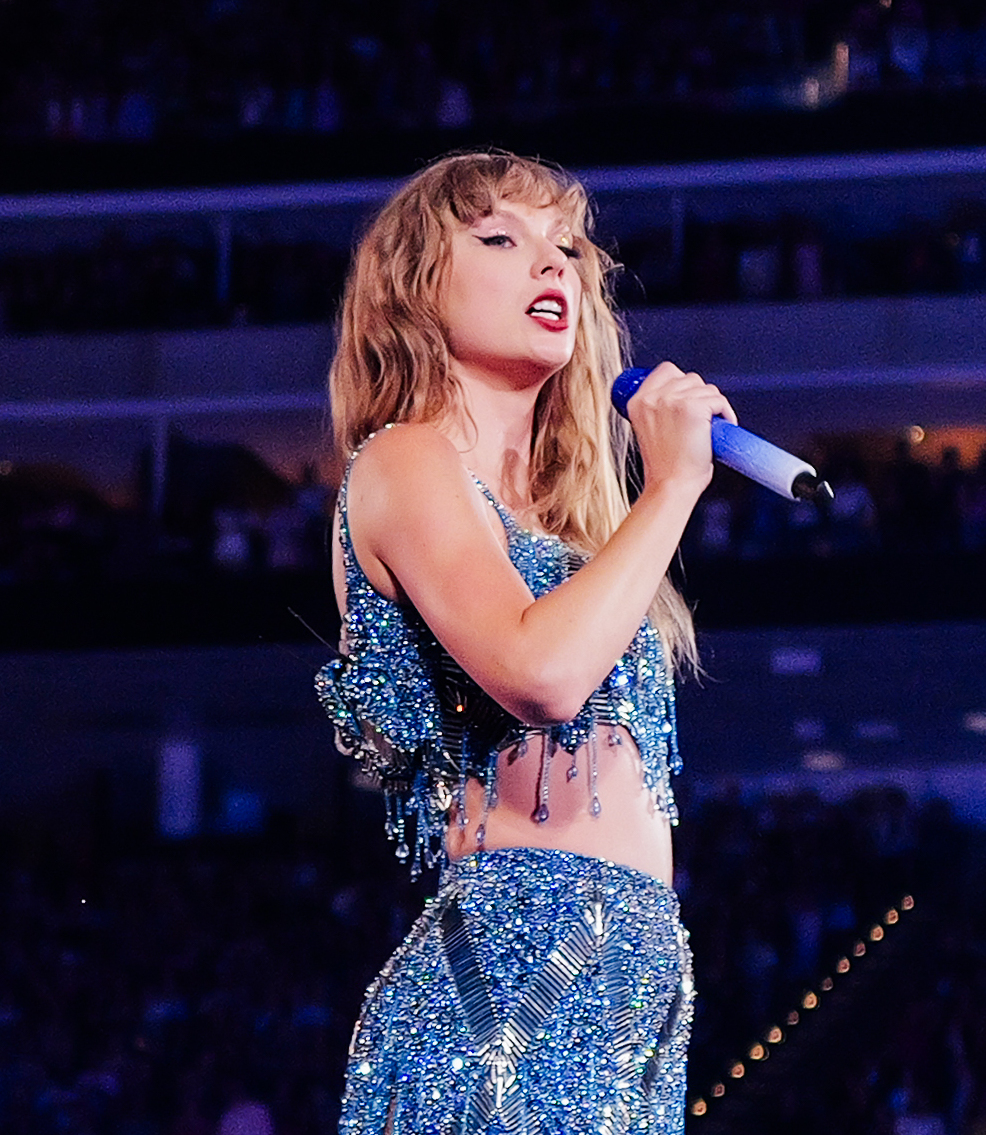
Eight albums by American singer Taylor Swift featured among the top performing albums of 2023

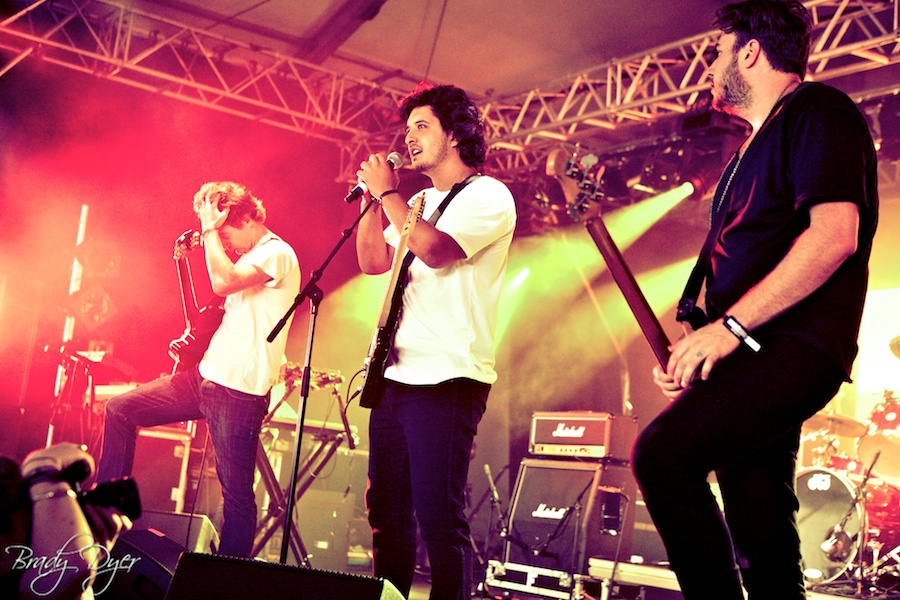
New Zealand band Six60's 2011 album Six60 (1) was the top performing domestic release

This is a list of the top-selling albums in New Zealand for 2023 from the Official New Zealand Music Chart's end-of-year chart, compiled by Recorded Music NZ. Recorded Music NZ also published a list for the top 20 albums released by New Zealand artists.

== Chart ==
Key
† – Album of New Zealand origin (Note: Whether or not a song is of New Zealand origin is determined by Recorded Music NZ.)

Rank	Artist	Title
1	SZA	SOS
2	The Weeknd	The Highlights
3	Taylor Swift	Midnights
4	Harry Styles	Harry's House
5	Fleetwood Mac	Rumours
6	Taylor Swift	1989 (Taylor's Version)
7	Taylor Swift	1989
8	Morgan Wallen	One Thing at a Time
9	Metro Boomin	Heroes & Villains
10	Olivia Rodrigo	Sour
11	Taylor Swift	Lover
12	Taylor Swift	Folklore
13	Taylor Swift	Reputation
14	Ed Sheeran	÷
15	Six60	Six60 (1)
16	Post Malone	The Diamond Collection
17	Pop Smoke	Shoot for the Stars, Aim for the Moon
18	Kanye West	Graduation
19	Taylor Swift	Speak Now (Taylor's Version)
20	Harry Styles	Fine Line
21	Various Artists	Barbie the Album
22	Olivia Rodrigo	Guts
23	Eminem	Curtain Call 2
24	Arctic Monkeys	AM
25	Six60	Six60 (3)
26	Ed Sheeran	=
27	SZA	Ctrl
28	XXXTentacion	Look at Me: The Album
29	Dr. Dre	2001
30	Dua Lipa	Future Nostalgia
31	Katy Perry	Teenage Dream
32	Travis Scott	Utopia
33	50 Cent	Get Rich or Die Tryin'
34	Sons of Zion	First XV
35	Bruno Mars	Doo-Wops & Hooligans
36	Lewis Capaldi	Divinely Uninspired to a Hellish Extent
37	Eminem	The Eminem Show
38	Doja Cat	Planet Her
39	Kendrick Lamar	Damn
40	Frank Ocean	Blonde
41	Rihanna	Anti
42	Kendrick Lamar	Good Kid, M.A.A.D City
43	Rihanna	Good Girl Gone Bad
44	Lana Del Rey	Born to Die
45	Billie Eilish	When We All Fall Asleep, Where Do We Go?
46	Billie Eilish	Happier Than Ever
47	Lady Gaga	The Fame Monster
48	Luke Combs	This One's for You
49	Taylor Swift	Red (Taylor's Version)
50	Nicki Minaj	Queen Radio: Volume 1

== Top 20 Albums by New Zealand artists ==
Rank	Artist	Title
1	Six60	Six60 (1)
2	Six60	Six60 (3)
3	Sons of Zion	First XV
4	Six60	Six60 EP
5	Coterie	Coterie
6	Six60	Six60 (2)
7	Various Artists	Moana: Original Motion Picture Soundtrack
8	L.A.B.	L.A.B. IV
9	L.A.B.	L.A.B. III
10	Katchafire	Revival
11	Six60	Castle St
12	Stan Walker	All In
13	Lorde	Melodrama
14	Home Brew	Home Brew
15	Lorde	Pure Heroine
16	Kora	Kora
17	L.A.B.	L.A.B.
18	1814	Jah Rydem
19	L.A.B.	L.A.B. V
20	Drax Project	Drax Project
