= New Zealand top 50 albums of 2008 =

This is a list of the top-selling albums in New Zealand for 2008 from the Official New Zealand Music Chart's end-of-year chart, compiled by Recorded Music NZ.

== Chart ==
Key
‡ – Album of New Zealand origin

Rank	Artist	Title
1	Billy T. James	The Comic Genius of Billy T James^{‡}
2	Kings of Leon	Only by the Night
3	Mamma Mia cast	Mamma Mia! The Movie Soundtrack
4	Duffy	Rockferry
5	Amy Winehouse	Back to Black
6	Coldplay	Viva la Vida or Death and All His Friends
7	Metallica	Death Magnetic
8	Pink	Funhouse
9	Tiki Taane	Past, Present, Future^{‡}
10	The Feelers	The Best: '98-'08^{‡}
11	Flight of the Conchords	Flight of the Conchords^{‡}
12	AC/DC	Black Ice
13	Chris Brown	Exclusive
14	Miley Cyrus	Breakout
15	Opshop	Second Hand Planet^{‡}
16	The Priests	The Priests
17	High School Musical cast	High School Musical 3: Senior Year
18	Disturbed	Indestructible
19	Rob Guest	Rob Guest: 1950 - 2008^{‡}
20	Lady Gaga	The Fame
21	Leona Lewis	Spirit
22	Rihanna	Good Girl Gone Bad: Reloaded
23	Phil Collins	...Hits
24	Jack Johnson	Sleep Through the Static
25	Guns N' Roses	Chinese Democracy
26	Enya	And Winter Came…
27	André Rieu	Waltzing Matilda: New Zealand Edition
28	The Black Seeds	Solid Ground^{‡}
29	Westlife	Unbreakable: The Greatest Hits Volume 1 (2008 NZ Tour Edition)
30	Geoff Sewell	Believe^{‡}
31	OneRepublic	Dreaming Out Loud
32	Josh Groban	A Collection
33	Herbs	Lights of the Pacific: The Very Best of Herbs^{‡}
34	Shihad	Beautiful Machine^{‡}
35	Kora	Kora^{‡}
36	Britney Spears	Circus
37	The Killers	Day & Age
38	Neil Diamond	Home Before Dark
39	Miley Cyrus	Hannah Montana 2: Meet Miley Cyrus
40	Robert Plant and Alison Krauss	Raising Sand
41	The Veronicas	Hook Me Up
42	Nickelback	Dark Horse
43	The Black Seeds	Into the Dojo^{‡}
44	Anika Moa	In Swings the Tide^{‡}
45	Camp Rock cast	Camp Rock
46	ABBA	Gold
47	Rod Stewart	The Story So Far: The Very Best of Rod Stewart
48	Slipknot	All Hope Is Gone
49	Bob Marley	Legend: The Best of Bob Marley
50	T.I.	Paper Trail
