= New Zealand top 50 albums of 1998 =

This is a list of the top 50 albums in New Zealand of 1998 as compiled by Recorded Music NZ in the end-of-year chart of the Official New Zealand Music Chart. Five albums by New Zealand artists are included on the chart, the highest being The Feelers' debut album Supersystem at No. 2.

== Chart ==
Key
† – Album of New Zealand origin

Rank	Artist	Title
1	Bee Gees	One Night Only
2	The Feelers	Supersystem †
3	Celine Dion	Let's Talk About Love
4	Martin Winch	Espresso Guitar †
5	Five	Five
6	Vonda Shepard	Songs from Ally McBeal
7	Spice Girls	Spiceworld
8	The Verve	Urban Hymns
9	John Travolta / Olivia Newton-John	Grease: The Original Soundtrack from the Motion Picture
10	Massive Attack	Mezzanine
11	U2	The Best of 1980–1990
12	Boyzone	Where We Belong
13	James Horner	Titanic: Music from the Motion Picture
14	Lighthouse Family	Postcards from Heaven
15	Aqua	Aquarium
16	Madonna	Ray of Light
17	Matchbox 20	Yourself or Someone Like You
18	Sublime	Sublime
19	Radiohead	OK Computer
20	Various artists	City of Angels: Music from the Motion Picture
21	Shania Twain	Come On Over
22	Dean Martin	The Very Best of Dean Martin: The Capitol & Reprise Years
23	B*Witched	B*Witched
24	Backstreet Boys	Backstreet's Back
25	Beastie Boys	Hello Nasty
26	Neil Finn	Try Whistling This †
27	Savage Garden	Savage Garden
28	Alanis Morissette	Supposed Former Infatuation Junkie
29	Garbage	Version 2.0
30	The Smashing Pumpkins	Adore
31	Various artists	The Wedding Singer
32	Portishead	Portishead
33	Phil Collins	Hits
34	Emma Shapplin	Carmine Meo
35	Celine Dion	These Are Special Times
36	The Mavericks	Trampoline
37	All Saints	All Saints
38	Morcheeba	Big Calm
39	Janet Jackson	The Velvet Rope
40	George Michael	Ladies & Gentlemen: The Best of George Michael
41	Bic Runga	Drive †
42	Lauryn Hill	The Miseducation of Lauryn Hill
43	Sash!	It's My Life
44	Pearl Jam	Yield
45	Cherry Poppin' Daddies	Zoot Suit Riot: The Swingin' Hits of the Cherry Poppin' Daddies
46	Natalie Imbruglia	Left of the Middle
47	Finley Quaye	Maverick A Strike
48	Che Fu	2b S.Pacific †
49	Marilyn Manson	Mechanical Animals
50	Dire Straits	Sultans of Swing: The Very Best of Dire Straits
