= New Zealand top 50 albums of 2000 =

New Zealand music chart

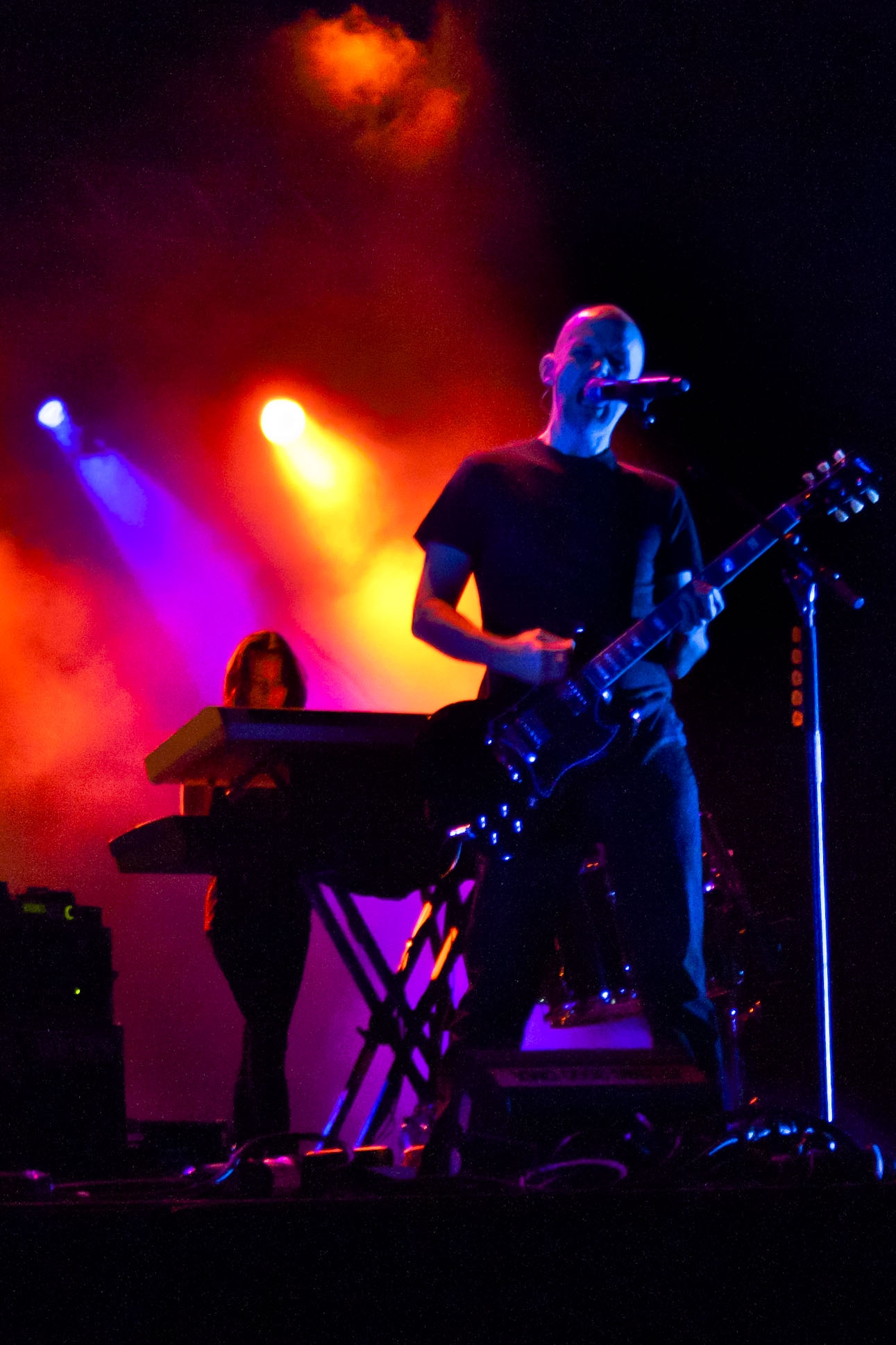
American musician Moby released the top performing album of the year, Play

This is a list of the top-selling albums in New Zealand for 2000 from the Official New Zealand Music Chart's end-of-year chart, compiled by Recorded Music NZ.

The Official New Zealand Music Chart is based on retail sales both physical and digital from music retailers in New Zealand during the year 2000.

== Chart ==
Key
† – Album of New Zealand origin (Note: Whether or not a song is of New Zealand origin is determined by Recorded Music NZ.)

Rank	Artist	Title
1	Moby	Play
2	Robbie Williams	The Ego Has Landed
3	Red Hot Chili Peppers	Californiacation
4	Santana	Supernatural
5	Macy Gray	On How Life Is
6	Vengaboys	The Platinum Album
7	Destiny's Child	The Writing's on the Wall
8	Celine Dion	All the Way... A Decade of Song
9	Eminem	The Marshall Mathers LP
10	Creed	Human Clay
11	Blink 182	Enema of the State
12	Anastacia	Not That Kind
13	Britney Spears	Oops!... I Did It Again
14	Westlife	Westlife
15	The Corrs	In Blue
16	Robbie Williams	Sing When You're Winning
17	Kiri Te Kanawa	Maori Songs
18	Limp Bizkit	Significant Other
19	Dr. Dre	2001
20	St Germain	Tourist
21	Shihad	The General Electric
22	stellar*	Mix
23	B.B. King & Eric Clapton	Riding with the King
24	Zed	Silencer
25	Christina Aguilera	Christina Aguilera
26	Carl Doy	Piano by Candlelight Entree
27	Martin Winch	Espresso Guitar Two
28	Simon & Garfunkel	Tales from New York: The Very Best of Simon & Garfunkel
29	Ronan Keating	Ronan
30	Tom Jones	Reload
31	Craig David	Born to Do It
32	Ben Harper	Burn To Shine
33	NSYNC	No Strings Attached
34	Marc Anthony	Marc Anthony
35	Shania Twain	Come On Over
36	Vengaboys	The Party Album
37	Tadpole	The Buddhafinger
38	Five	Invincible
39	Savage Garden	Affirmation
40	The Chemical Brothers	Surrender
41	Bob Marley and the Wailers	Chant Down Babylon
42	Nelly	Country Grammar
43	Morcheeba	Fragments of Freedom
44	Pink	Can't Take Me Home
45	Various	Mission: Impossible 2 (soundtrack)
46	Ricky Martin	Ricky Martin
47	Gabrielle	Rise
48	Limp Bizkit	Chocolate Starfish and the Hot Dog Flavored Water
49	Travis	The Man Who
50	Eiffel 65	Europop

== See also ==
- List of number-one albums from the 2000s (New Zealand)
