= List of number-one compilation albums from the 2000s (New Zealand) =

This is a list of the number-one compilation albums in New Zealand for the decade of the 2000s from the Official New Zealand Music Chart, compiled by Recorded Music NZ, starting from 5 January 2003.

== Number ones ==
Title	Label	Weeks at number one	Certification	Reached number one	Ref
Music to Watch Girls By	Col/Sony	1	Platinum	5 March 2000	
Video Hits Vol.2	BMG	1	Platinum x5	12 March 2000	
Music to Watch Girls By	Col/Sony	2	Platinum	19 March 2000	
Dance Now 2000	Shock/BMG	2	Platinum x2	2 April 2000	
Just The Hits	BMG	7	Platinum x2	16 April 2000	
Now Thats What I Call Music 6	Capitol/EMI	7	Platinum x2	4 June 2000	
Just The Hits Vol. 2	BMG	1	Platinum	23 July 2000	
Lagered! The Sixth Pack	Universal	1	—	30 July 2000	
Just The Hits Vol. 2	BMG	5	Platinum	6 August 2000	
Gatecrasher: Global Sound System	Col/Sony	1	Platinum	10 September 2000	
Cafe Mambo: The Real Sound of Ibiza	Col/Sony	1	—	17 September 2000	
Gatecrasher: Global Sound System	Col/Sony	2	Platinum	24 September 2000	
Mai Music Volume 4	Universal	4	Gold	8 October 2000	
Back 2 Back	Universal	3	—	5 November 2000	
Dance Now 2000 Vol 2	Shock/BMG	1	Gold	26 November 2000	
Now Thats What I Call Music 7	Capitol/EMI	2	Platinum x3	3 December 2000	
Just The Hits Vol. 3	BMG	5	Platinum x4	17 December 2000	
Title	Label	Weeks at number one	Certification	Reached number one	Ref
100% Hits Volume 5	Warner	7	Platinum	21 January 2001	
Gatecrasher: Global Sound System	Col/Sony	1	Platinum	11 March 2001	
Gatecrasher: National Anthems	Col/Sony	2	Gold	18 March 2001	
Ultimate Trance Anthems	Universal	1	—	1 April 2001	
Superstars	Warner	1	Gold	8 April 2001	
It's All Good!	FMR	1	—	15 April 2001	
Nice 'n'Urlich 2	FMR	1	—	22 April 2001	
Just the Hits Vol. 4	Col/Sony	3	Platinum	29 April 2001	
Lazy Sunday	Capitol/EMI	1	Platinum	20 May 2001	
Now That's What I Call Music 8	Capitol/EMI	2	Platinum x4	27 May 2001	
The Rhythm Vol. 19	Warner	2	Platinum x2	10 June 2001	
Now That's What I Call Music 8	Capitol/EMI	1	Platinum x4	24 June 2001	
The Rhythm Vol. 19	Warner	1	Platinum x2	1 July 2001	
Now That's What I Call Music 8	Capitol/EMI	5	Platinum x4	8 July 2001	
Lagered: The Next Level	Universal	4	Gold	12 August 2001	
The Ultimate Rhythm & Black Collection	Col/Sony	4	Platinum	9 September 2001	
Just the Hits Vol. 5	Warner	7	Platinum x2	7 October 2001	
Now That's What I Call Music 9	Capitol/EMI	9	Platinum x5	25 November 2001	
Title	Label	Weeks at number one	Certification	Reached number one	Ref
Nature's Best: Our Top 30	Epic/Sony	6	Platinum x6	27 January 2002	
The Classic Chillout Album	Sony	1	Platinum x3	10 March 2002	
Nature's Best: Our Top 30	Epic/Sony	1	Platinum x6	17 March 2002	
The Classic Chillout Album	Sony	4	Platinum x3	24 March 2002	
Wired Up	Universal	1	Platinum	21 April 2002	
The Classic Chillout Album	Sony	4	Platinum x3	28 April 2002	
Now That's What I Call Music 10	Capitol/EMI	7	Platinum x2	26 May 2002	
Nature's Best: Our Top 30	Epic/Sony	1	Platinum x6	14 July 2002	
The Rhythm Vol. 21	Warner	6	Platinum x2	21 July 2002	
Nature's Best: Our Top 30	Epic/Sony	3	Platinum x6	1 September 2002	
The Classic Chillout Album Vol. 2	Sony	1	Platinum	22 September 2002	
Top of the Pops Volume 2	Universal	3	Platinum	29 September 2002	
Natures Best 2	Sony	4	Platinum x3	20 October 2002	
Off the Hook	Universal	1	Platinum	17 November 2002	
Now That's What I Call Music 11	EMI	8	Platinum x7	24 November 2002	
Title	Label	Weeks at number one	Certification	Reached number one	Ref
Simply the Best Reggae Album	Warner	2	Platinum	19 January 2003	
Now That's What I Call Music 11	EMI	1	Platinum x7	2 February 2003	
Lady Sings the Blues	Capitol/EMI	9	Platinum x2	9 February 2003	
Kickin' 14	BMG	3	Platinum	13 April 2003	
Off the Hook 2	Universal	1	Platinum	4 May 2003	
Emotions 0.1	Sony	1	Platinum	11 May 2003	
The Ultimate Chick Flick Soundtrack	Warner	1	Platinum	18 May 2003	
Now That's What I Call Music 12	EMI	7	Platinum x3	25 May 2003	
Very Best of Relaxing Classics	Universal	5	Platinum	13 July 2003	
Hip Hop: The Collection	Universal	9	Platinum x2	17 August 2003	
The Best of Cafe Del Mar	Universal	1	—	19 October 2003	
Hip Hop: The Collection	Universal	1	Platinum x2	26 October 2003	
Major Flavours 4	Universal	4	Platinum x2	2 November 2003	
Now That's What I Call Music 13	EMI	3	Platinum x6	30 November 2003	
The Best Christmas Album in the World... Ever!	EMI	4	Platinum x6	21 December 2003	
Title	Label	Weeks at number one	Certification	Reached number one	Ref
Now That's What I Call Music 13	EMI	4	Platinum x6	18 January 2004	
Lady Sings the Blues: Volume 2	EMI	1	Gold	15 February 2004	
Lazy Sunday 4	EMI	2	Gold	22 February 2004	
Now That's What I Call Music 13	EMI	1	Platinum x6	7 March 2004	
Crusty Demons: Global Assault Tour	Warner	2	Gold	14 March 2004	
Now That's What I Call Music 14	EMI	7	Platinum x3	28 March 2004	
Girls' Night Out	EMI	1	Gold	10 May 2004	
Now That's What I Call Music 14	EMI	5	Platinum x3	17 May 2004	
The R&B Collection	Universal	2	Platinum	21 June 2004	
Playlist	BMG	3	Platinum x2	5 July 2004	
Now That's What I Call Music 15	EMI	5	Platinum x2	26 July 2004	
Unleashed 2	Sony	5	Platinum	30 August 2004	
Major Flavours 5	Universal	6	Platinum x2	4 October 2004	
Memories are Made of This	EMI	1	Platinum x2	15 November 2004	
Now That's What I Call Music 16	EMI	4	Platinum x4	22 November 2004	
The Best Christmas Album in the World... Ever!	EMI	2	Platinum x6	20 December 2004	
Title	Label	Weeks at number one	Certification	Reached number one	Ref
Now That's What I Call Music 16	EMI	2	Platinum x4	3 January 2005	
The Rhythm 25	WEA/Warner	3	Gold	17 January 2005	
Summer in the Sixties	EMI	1	Gold	7 February 2005	
Lazy Sunday 5	EMI	1	Gold	15 February 2005	
Memories are Made of This	EMI	2	Platinum x2	21 February 2005	
Holla Hour	Universal	2	Gold	7 March 2005	
Now That's What I Call Music 17	EMI	7	Platinum x2	21 March 2005	
Super '70s Rock	EMI	1	Platinum	9 May 2005	
Now That's What I Call Music 17	EMI	6	Platinum x2	16 May 2005	
Golden Kiwis	EMI	1	—	27 June 2005	
Broken Dreams: Rock Anthem	WEA/Warner	1	Platinum	4 July 2005	
Now That's What I Call Music 18	EMI	12	Platinum x5	11 July 2005	
Power Ballads	EMI	6	Platinum x2	3 October 2005	
Now That's What I Call Music 19	EMI	9	Platinum x6	14 November 2005	
Title	Label	Weeks at number one	Certification	Reached number one	Ref
The Best Reggae Album in the World... Ever!	EMI	2	Platinum x2	16 January 2006	
More Nature: A Selection of New Zealand's Best	SBME	7	Platinum	30 January 2006	
Now That's What I Call Music 20	EMI	8	Platinum x4	20 March 2006	
Acoustic Love Songs	WEA/Warner	1	Platinum	15 May 2006	
Waiting for the Weekend	Universal	2	Platinum	22 May 2006	
Electric Dreams: '80s Synth Pop Classics	EMI	1	Platinum	5 June 2006	
Girls Allowed	Universal	2	Platinum	12 June 2006	
The Best Disco Album in the World... Ever!	EMI	1	Platinum	26 June 2006	
Now That's What I Call Music 21	EMI	9	Platinum x2	3 July 2006	
I Love Dad	EMI	1	—	4 September 2006	
Dance Now 2006	Shock	2	Gold	11 September 2006	
The Best Moods Album in the World... Ever!	EMI	1	Gold	25 September 2006	
Power Ballads II	EMI	3	Gold	2 October 2006	
Unleashed 2006	SBME	1	Platinum	23 October 2006	
Housework Songs	EMI	2	Platinum x3	30 October 2006	
Now That's What I Call Music 22	EMI	10	Platinum x5	13 November 2006	
Label	Title	Weeks at number one	Certification	Reached number one	Ref
Housework Songs	EMI	1	Platinum x3	22 January 2007	
Beyond the Sea	SBME	2	Gold	29 January 2007	
Chick Flicks	WEA/Warner	4	Platinum	12 February 2007	
Waiting for the Weekend	Universal	4	Platinum	12 March 2007	
Now That's What I Call Music 23	EMI	12	Platinum x2	9 April 2007	
Sad Songs	EMI	1	Platinum	2 July 2007	
Now That's What I Call Music 24	EMI	8	Platinum x2	9 July 2007	
Old Skool of Rock	Universal	1	Gold	3 September 2007	
Now That's What I Call Music 24	EMI	1	Platinum x2	10 September 2007	
Tha 411	SBME	4	Gold	17 September 2007	
Housework Songs II	EMI	4	Platinum	15 October 2007	
Now That's What I Call Music 25	EMI	8	Platinum x3	12 November 2007	
Title	Label	Weeks at number one	Certification	Reached number one	Ref
Rocked 07	WEA/Warner	1	Platinum x2	6 January 2008	
My Songs	Universal	6	Platinum	14 January 2008	
Happy Songs	EMI	2	Gold	25 February 2008	
R&B Hookups	Universal	2	Gold	10 March 2008	
Now That's What I Call Music 26	EMI	7	Platinum x2	24 March 2008	
Mum's Favourite Songs	EMI	1	Gold	12 May 2008	
Now That's What I Call Music 26	EMI	2	Platinum x2	19 May 2008	
Dreamboats and Petticoats	Universal	4	Gold	2 June 2008	
Return of the Mack	SBME	1	Gold	30 June 2008	
Now That's What I Call Music 27	EMI	9	Platinum x2	7 July 2008	
Platinum Rock: Volume 2	WEA/Warner	5	Gold	8 September 2008	
While my Guitar Gently Weeps	Universal	1	Gold	13 October 2008	
Jim Beam: 40 Shots of Rock	Liberation/Universal	2	Platinum	20 October 2008	
While my Guitar Gently Weeps	Universal	1	Gold	3 November 2008	
Now That's What I Call Music 28	EMI	9	Platinum x3	10 November 2008	
Title	Label	Weeks at number one	Certification	Reached number one	Ref
My Songs 2	Universal	7	Gold	12 January 2009	
My Boo	Sony	2	—	2 March 2009	
40 Shades of Green	Big Joke/Sony	2	Gold	16 March 2009	
Now That's What I Call Music 29	EMI	5	Platinum x2	30 March 2009	
The Great New Zealand Songbook	Sony	8	Platinum x7	3 May 2009	
Big Country	Sony	1	Gold	29 June 2009	
Now That's What I Call Music 30	EMI	8	Platinum	6 July 2009	
Music from the Breeze	EMI	6	Gold	31 August 2009	
Hits for Kids	Sony	2	—	12 October 2009	
The Great New Zealand Songbook	Sony	2	Platinum x7	26 October 2009	
Now That's What I Call Music 31	EMI	12	Platinum x4	9 November 2009	
