= New Zealand top 50 albums of 2017 =

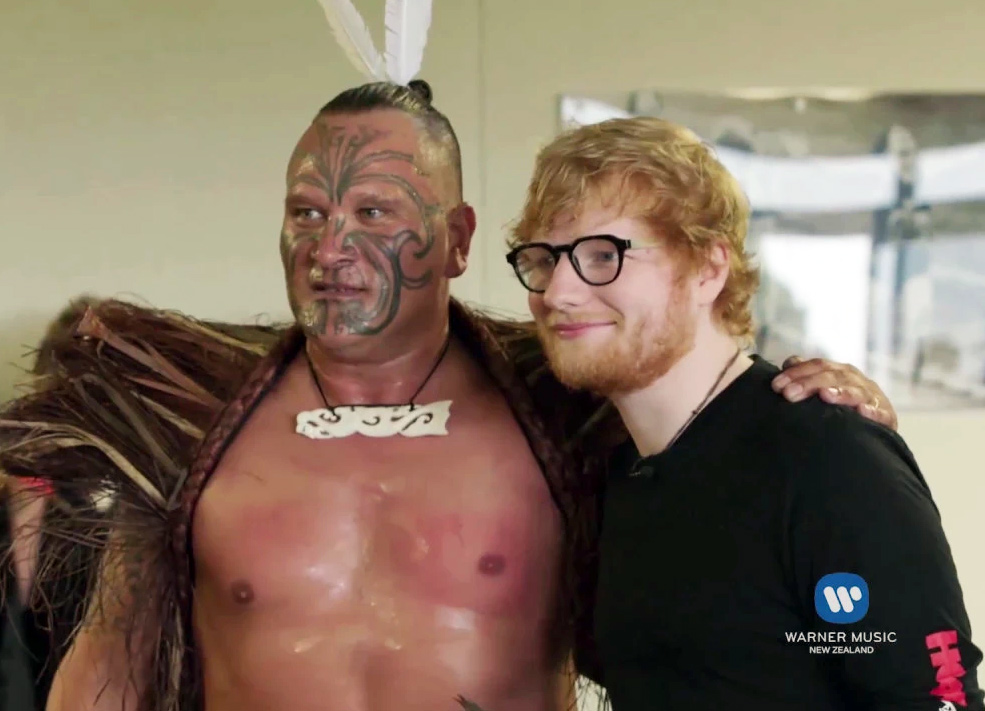
British singer Ed Sheeran's ÷ was the best performing album of the year

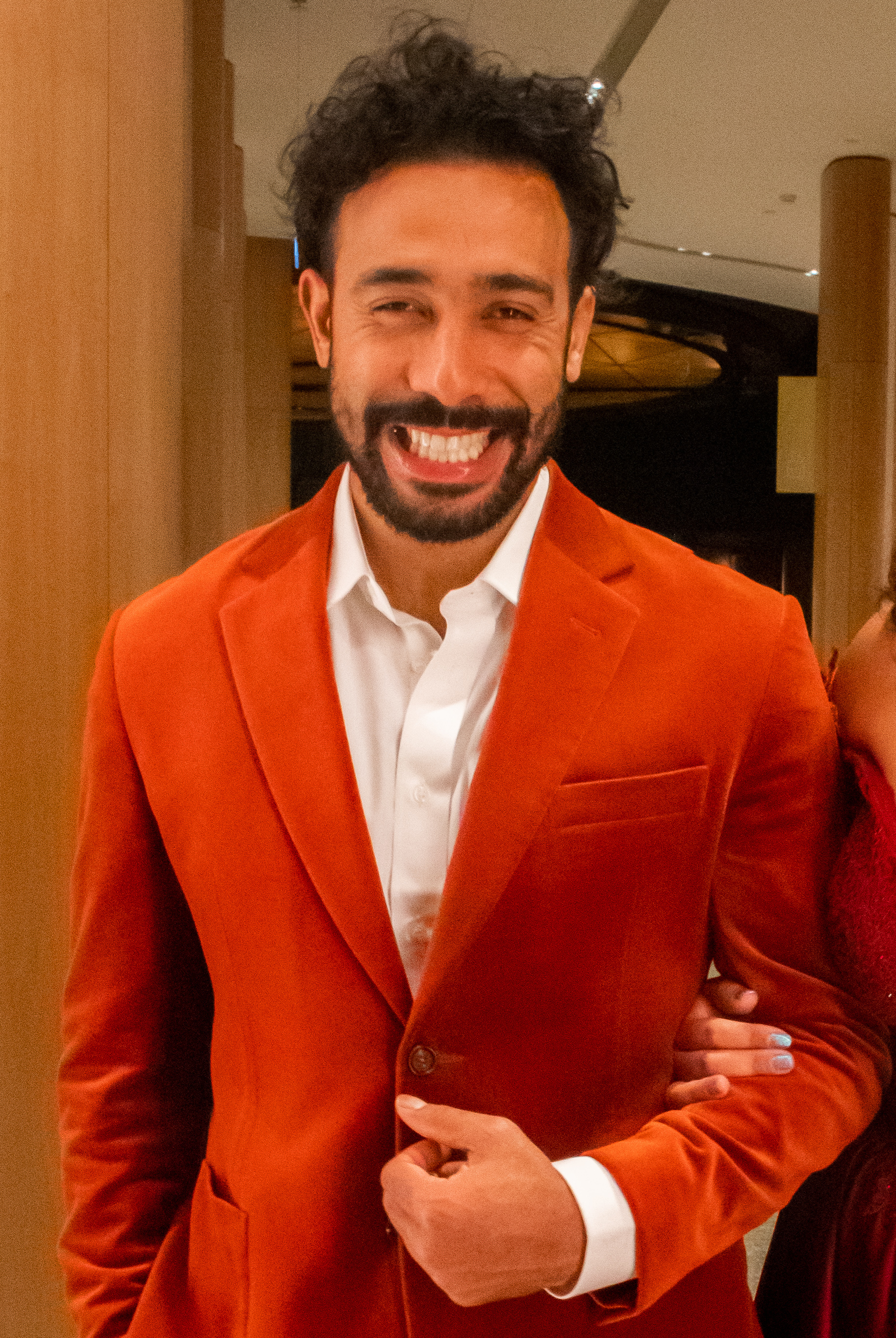
New Zealand group Sol3 Mio released the top performing New Zealand album of the year (pictured: Moses Mackay)

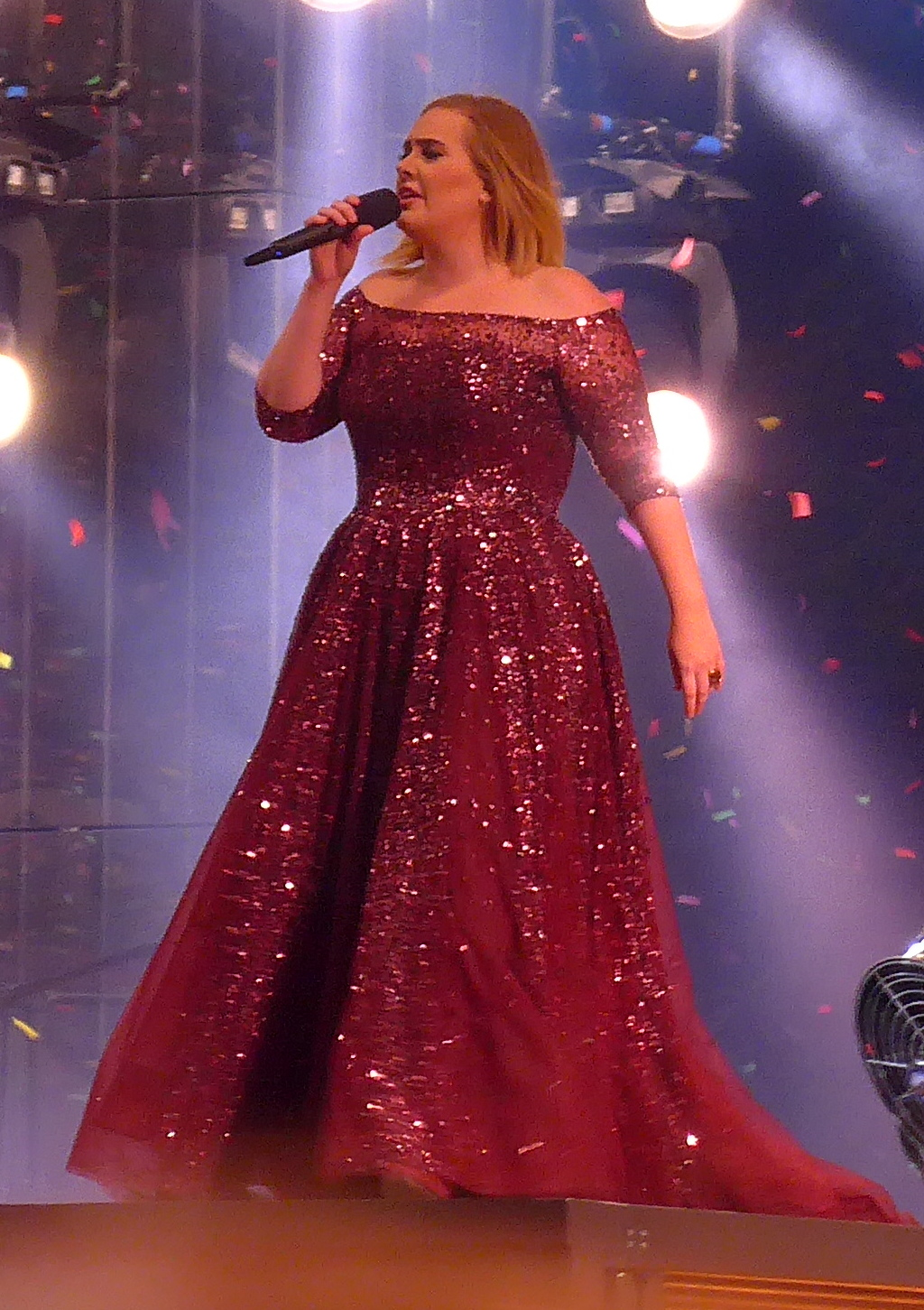
British singer Adele released the second best performing album of the year, 25 (2015)

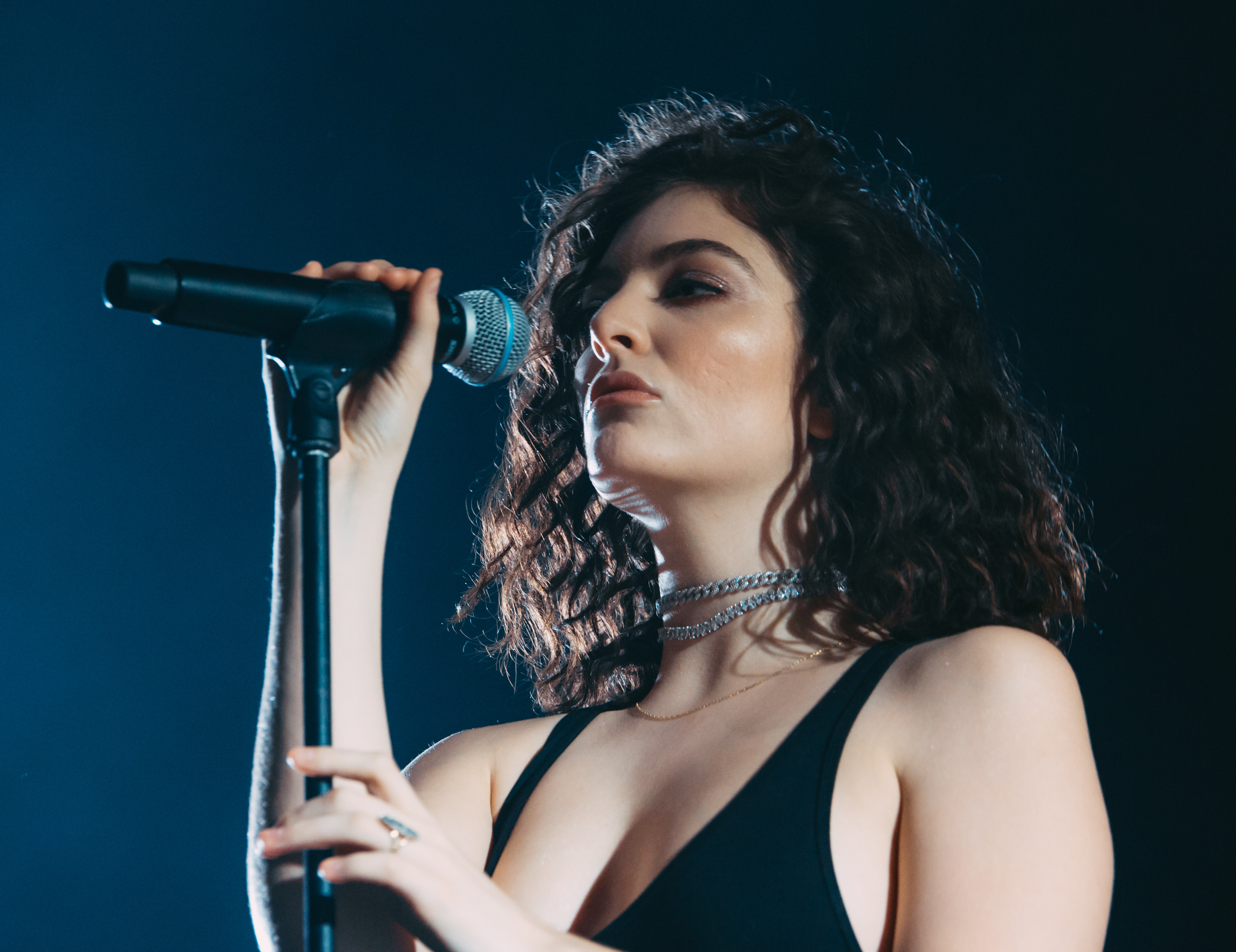
New Zealand singer Lorde's Melodrama was the second highest performing album by a New Zealand musician in 2017

This is a list of the top-selling albums in New Zealand for 2017 from the Official New Zealand Music Chart's end-of-year chart, compiled by Recorded Music NZ. Recorded Music NZ also published a list for the top 20 albums released by New Zealand artists.

== Chart ==
Key
† – Album of New Zealand origin (Note: Whether or not a song is of New Zealand origin is determined by the RIANZ.)

Rank	Artist	Title
1	Ed Sheeran	÷
2	Adele	25
3	Pink	Beautiful Trauma
4	Sol3 Mio	A Very M3rry Christmas
5	Lorde	Melodrama
6	Various Artists	Moana: Original Motion Picture Soundtrack
7	Bruno Mars	24K Magic
8	Kendrick Lamar	Damn
9	Ed Sheeran	x: Wembley Edition
10	Taylor Swift	Reputation
11	Michael Bublé	Christmas: Deluxe Special Edition
12	Post Malone	Stoney
13	Rag'n'Bone Man	Human
14	The Weeknd	Starboy
15	Justin Bieber	Purpose
16	Drake	More Life
17	Adele	21
18	Sam Smith	The Thrill of It All
19	Six60	Six60 (2)
20	Harry Styles	Harry Styles
21	Khalid	American Teen
22	Various Artists	Trolls: Original Motion Picture Soundtrack
23	Foo Fighters	Concrete and Gold
24	Imagine Dragons	Evolve
25	Zara Larsson	So Good
26	Drake	Views
27	Twenty One Pilots	Blurryface
28	Rihanna	Anti
29	Eminem	Revival
30	Sam Smith	In the Lonely Hour: Drowning Shadows Edition
31	The Chainsmokers	Memories...Do Not Open
32	Ariana Grande	Dangerous Woman
33	Six60	Six60 EP
34	Little Mix	Glory Days: Platinum Edition
35	Various Artists	Suicide Squad: The Album
36	The Chainsmokers	Collage
37	Dave Dobbyn	A Slice of Heaven: 40 Years of Hits
38	Calvin Harris	Funk Wav Bounces Vol. 1
39	XXXTentacion	17
40	Shawn Mendes	Illuminate
41	Charlie Puth	Nine Track Mind
42	The Rolling Stones	Blue & Lonesome
43	Kendrick Lamar	Good Kid, M.A.A.D City
44	Sticky Fingers	Caress Your Soul
45	Coldplay	A Head Full of Dreams
46	Various Artists	Guardians of the Galaxy Vol. 2: Awesome Mix Vol. 2 (Original Motion Picture Soundtrack)
47	Prince Tui Teka	E Ipo: The Very Best Of
48	Elvis Presley and the Royal Philharmonic Orchestra	Christmas with Elvis and the Royal Philharmonic Orchestra
49	The Weeknd	Beauty Behind the Madness
50	The Koi Boys	Meant to Be

== Top 20 albums by New Zealand artists ==
Rank	Artist	Title
1	Sol3 Mio	A Very M3rry Christmas
2	Lorde	Melodrama
3	Various Artists	Moana: Original Motion Picture Soundtrack
4	Six60	Six60 (2)
5	Six60	Six60 EP
6	Dave Dobbyn	A Slice of Heaven: 40 Years of Hits
7	Prince Tui Teka	E Ipo: The Very Best Of
8	The Koi Boys	Meant to Be
9	Billy T. James	The Comic Genius of Billy T. James: Deluxe Edition
10	Devilskin	Be Like the River
11	Dennis Marsh	I Believe
12	Rebecca Nelson	Poppies and Pohutukawa
13	Aldous Harding	Party
14	Various Artists	Stir It Up: Aotearoa's Tribute to Bob Marley
15	Broods	Conscious
16	The Koi Boys	Shake It
17	Maria Dallas	The Best Of
18	Brooke Fraser	A Sides
19	The Black Seeds	Fabric
20	Neil Finn	Out of Silence
