= List of number-one singles in 1967 (New Zealand) =

This is a list of number one singles for the year 1967 on the New Zealand Singles Chart.

== Chart ==
Week	Artist	Title
6 January 1967	Summer break - no chart	Summer break - no chart
13 January 1967	Summer break - no chart	Summer break - no chart
20 January 1967	Summer break - no chart	Summer break - no chart
27 January 1967	The Beach Boys	"Good Vibrations"
3 February 1967	Tommy Roe	"Hooray for Hazel"
10 February 1967	Dave Dee, Dozy, Beaky, Mick & Tich	"Bend It!"
17 February 1967	Dave Dee, Dozy, Beaky, Mick & Tich	"Bend It!"
24 February 1967	The Monkees	"I'm a Believer"
3 March 1967	The Monkees	"I'm a Believer"
10 March 1967	The Monkees	"I'm a Believer"
17 March 1967	The Monkees	"I'm a Believer"
24 March 1967	The Monkees	"I'm a Believer"
31 March 1967	The Beatles	"Penny Lane"
7 April 1967	The Beatles	"Penny Lane"
14 April 1967	The La De Da's	"Hey! Baby"
21 April 1967	The La De Da's	"Hey! Baby"
28 April 1967	The Seekers	"Georgy Girl"
5 May 1967	Cat Stevens	"Matthew and Son"
12 May 1967	Cat Stevens	"Matthew and Son"
19 May 1967	The Bee Gees	"Spicks and Specks"
26 May 1967	The Bee Gees	"Spicks and Specks"
2 June 1967	The Monkees	"A Little Bit Me, a Little Bit You"
9 June 1967	The Monkees	"A Little Bit Me, a Little Bit You"
16 June 1967	The Monkees	"A Little Bit Me, a Little Bit You"
23 June 1967	Mr. Lee Grant	"Opportunity"
30 June 1967	Sandie Shaw	"Puppet on a String"
7 July 1967	Sandie Shaw	"Puppet on a String"
14 July 1967	Sandie Shaw	"Puppet on a String"
21 July 1967	The Tremeloes	"Silence is Golden"
28 July 1967	The Tremeloes	"Silence is Golden"
4 August 1967	The Tremeloes	"Silence is Golden"
11 August 1967	Procol Harum	"A Whiter Shade of Pale"
18 August 1967	The Beatles	"All You Need Is Love"
25 August 1967	The Beatles	"All You Need Is Love"
1 September 1967	Mr. Lee Grant	"Thanks To You"
8 September 1967	Mr. Lee Grant	"Thanks To You"
15 September 1967	Mr. Lee Grant	"Thanks To You"
22 September 1967	Scott McKenzie	"San Francisco (Be Sure to Wear Flowers in Your Hair)"
29 September 1967	Scott McKenzie	"San Francisco (Be Sure to Wear Flowers in Your Hair)"
6 October 1967	Scott McKenzie	"San Francisco (Be Sure to Wear Flowers in Your Hair)"
13 October 1967	Scott McKenzie	"San Francisco (Be Sure to Wear Flowers in Your Hair)"
20 October 1967	Scott McKenzie	"San Francisco (Be Sure to Wear Flowers in Your Hair)"
27 October 1967	The Small Faces	"Itchycoo Park"
3 November 1967	The Small Faces	"Itchycoo Park"
10 November 1967	Engelbert Humperdinck	"The Last Waltz"
17 November 1967	Engelbert Humperdinck	"The Last Waltz"
24 November 1967	The Move	"Flowers in the Rain"
1 December 1967	The Bee Gees	"Massachusetts"
8 December 1967	The Bee Gees	"Massachusetts"
15 December 1967	The Bee Gees	"Massachusetts"
22 December 1967	The Royal Guardsmen	"Snoopy's Christmas"
29 December 1967	The Royal Guardsmen	"Snoopy's Christmas"
