= List of number-one compilation albums from the 2010s (New Zealand) =

This is a list of the number-one compilation albums in New Zealand for the decade of the 2010s from the Official New Zealand Music Chart, compiled by Recorded Music NZ, starting from 4 January 2010.

== Number ones ==
Key
* – Number-one compilation album of the year (Note: Annual charts are sourced from the RMNZ website.)

Title	Label	Weeks at number one	Certification	Reached number one	
Ten Guitars	Universal	1	Platinum x2	1 February 2010	
Now That's What I Call Music 31	EMI	1	Platinum x4	8 February 2010	
Love Songs from The Breeze	EMI	1	—	15 February 2010	
The Absolute Best Beer Drinking Songs in the World... Ever!	EMI	1	—	22 February 2010	
Big Country: Volume 2	Sony	2	—	1 March 2010	
Pasifika: the Collection	Dawn Raid/Universal	3	—	15 March 2010	
Now That's What I Call Music 32	EMI	12	Platinum x2	5 April 2010	
Let's Stay Together	Sony	1	—	28 June 2010	
Now That's What I Call Music 33	EMI	7	Platinum	5 July 2010	
American Anthems	Sony	1	Gold	23 August 2010	
The Great New Zealand Songbook: Volume 2	Sony	10	Platinum x3	30 August 2010	
Now That's What I Call Music 34	EMI	18	Platinum x3	8 November 2010	
Title	Label	Weeks at number one	Certification	Reached number one	
Pasifika: The Collection, Volume 2	Dawn Raid/Isaac/Universal	1	—	14 March 2011	
Million Dollar Riff	Sony	1	—	21 March 2011	
Songs for Japan	Universal	1	—	28 March 2011	
Rocked: Best of the Decade 2000-2010	WEA/Warner	1	—	4 April 2011	
Songs for Japan	Universal	1	—	11 April 2011	
Now That's What I Call Music 35	EMI	13	Platinum x2	18 April 2011	
Now That's What I Call Music 36	EMI	16	Platinum x2	18 July 2011	
Now That's What I Call Music 37	EMI	17	Platinum x4	7 November 2011	
Title	Label	Weeks at number one	Certification	Reached number one	
The George FM 2011 Yearbook	George/FMG/Universal	1	—	5 March 2012	
Pumped Up Hits: Summer Mix Tape	Sony	2	—	12 March 2012	
Relax and Unwind	Sony	2	Gold	26 March 2012	
Now That's What I Call Music 38	EMI	15	Platinum	9 April 2012	
Now That's What I Call Music 39	EMI	6	Platinum	23 July 2012	
Music from The Sound FM	Sony	2	Gold	3 September 2012	
Now That's What I Call Music 39	EMI	4	Platinum	17 September 2012	
Hits for Kids 4	Sony	1	Gold	15 October 2012	
Mai Throwbacks	Sony	1	—	22 October 2012	
Hits for Kids 4	Sony	1	Gold	29 October 2012	
Now That's What I Call Music 40	EMI	16	Platinum x4	5 November 2012	
Title	Label	Weeks at number one	Certification	Reached number one	
Turn up the Music: Your Summer Mixtape	Sony	2	—	25 February 2013	
Now That's What I Call Music 40	EMI	4	Platinum x4	11 March 2013	
Rnb Superclub: Volume 13	Sony	1	—	15 April 2013	
Now That's What I Call Music 41	EMI	9	Platinum	22 April 2013	
Waiata 2	Sony	2	—	24 June 2013	
Now That's What I Call Music 41	EMI	3	Platinum	2013	
More Music from The Sound FM	Sony	1	Gold	29 July 2013	
Now That's What I Call Music 42	EMI	14	Platinum	5 August 2013	
Now That's What I Call Music 43	EMI	4	Platinum x2	11 November 2013	
The Starship Christmas Album 2013	Universal	1	Platinum	9 December 2013	
Now That's What I Call Music 43	EMI	7	Platinum x2	16 December 2013	
Title	Label	Weeks at number one	Certification	Reached number one	Ref(s)
2014 Grammy Nominees	WEA/Warner	2	—	3 February 2014	
Coast: Love the Music	Sony	6	Gold	17 February 2014	
Now That's What I Call Music 43	EMI	3	Platinum x2	31 March 2014	
Now That's What I Call Music 44	EMI	13	Platinum	21 April 2014	
Now That's What I Call Music 45	EMI/Universal	12	Platinum	21 July 2014	
Hits For Kids 6	Sony	5	Platinum	13 October 2014	
Now That's What I Call Music 46	EMI/Universal	13	Platinum x2	17 November 2014	
Title	Label	Weeks at number one	Certification	Reached number one	Ref(s)
Summer Mix Tape 2015	Sony	1	—	16 February 2015	
Now That's What I Call Music 46	EMI/Universal	1	Platinum x2	23 February 2015	
Coast: Classics 2 - Love the Music	Sony	1	—	2 March 2015	
Now That's What I Call Music 46	EMI/Universal	1	Platinum x2	16 March 2015	
One Love: The Very Best of Aotearoa Reggae	Sony	2	—	23 March 2015	
Now That's What I Call Music 47	EMI/Universal	14	Platinum	6 April 2015	
Now That's What I Call Music 48	EMI/Universal	8	Platinum	13 July 2015	
Coast: I Love the Ballads	Sony	1	—	7 September 2015	
Now That's What I Call Music 48	EMI/Universal	9	Platinum	14 September 2015	
Now That's What I Call Music 49	EMI/Universal	21	Platinum x 2	16 November 2015	
Title	Label	Weeks at number one	Certification	Reached number one	Ref(s)
Magic	Universal	2	Gold	11 April 2016	
Now That's What I Call Music 50	EMI/Universal	7	Platinum	25 April 2016	
Magic	Universal	2	Gold	13 June 2016	
Now That's What I Call Music 50	EMI/Universal	2	Platinum	27 June 2016	
Magic	Universal	2	Gold	4 July 2016	
Now That's What I Call Music 51	EMI/Universal	14	Platinum	18 July 2016	
The Sound Hall of Fame	Sony	2		24 October 2016	
Now That's What I Call Music 51	EMI/Universal	1	Platinum	7 November 2016	
Now That's What I Call Music 52	EMI/Universal	16	Platinum	14 November 2016	
Title	Label	Weeks at number one	Certification	Reached number one	Ref(s)
ZM's Friday Jams	SonyMusic	3		6 March 2017	
WOMAD 2017	Cartell/Border	1		27 March 2017	
ZM's Friday Jams	SonyMusic	1		3 April 2017	
Now That's What I Call Music 52	EMI/Universal	1	Platinum	10 April 2017	
Magic Feels Good 2	Universal	1	Gold	17 April 2017	
Now That's What I Call Music 53	EMI/Universal	12	Gold	24 April 2017	
Now That's What I Call Music 54	EMI/Universal	12	Gold	17 July 2017	
The Very Best of The Breeze: Playlist 2017	SonyMusic	1		9 October 2017	
Now That's What I Call Music 54	EMI/Universal	3	Gold	16 October 2017	
The Sound Hall of Fame 2017	SonyMusic	1		6 November 2017	
Now That's What I Call Music 55	EMI/Universal	18	Platinum	13 November 2017	
Title	Label	Weeks at number one	Certification	Reached number one	Ref(s)
Beach Hop Magic	Universal	6		26 March 2018	
Coast: Love the Superstars	SonyMusic	1		7 May 2018	
Now That's What I Call Music 56	EMI/Universal	11		14 May 2018	
Now That's What I Call Music 57	EMI/Universal	7		30 July 2018	
Magic Feels Good '60s	Universal	4		17 September 2018	
Now That's What I Call Music 57	EMI/Universal	3		15 October 2018	
The Breeze: Totally '80s	SonyMusic	3		5 November 2018	
Now That's What I Call Music 58	EMI/Universal	17	Gold	26 November 2018	
Title	Label	Weeks at number one	Certification	Reached number one	Ref(s)
