= List of number-one albums from the 1970s (New Zealand) =

This is the Recorded Music NZ list of number-one albums in New Zealand during the 1970s decade. In May 1975 the Pop-O-Meter singles chart was replaced with the new Record Publications chart, a division of the New Zealand Phonographic Federation. As well as a new singles chart, a weekly album chart was compiled for the first time. The new top 40 album chart was launched in May 1975 by the New Zealand Phonographic Federation, and eventually expanded to a top 50 in 1979. The chart was collated by returns sent in by a representative sample of New Zealand music retailers. ABBA's 1975 compilation album The Best of ABBA charted at number one for a total of 18 weeks. Only two albums by New Zealand artists reached number one: folk-pop duo Bill and Boyd's self-titled album, and the New Zealand Symphony Orchestra's album The World's Great Classics.

The following albums were all number one in New Zealand in the 1970s.

== Number ones ==
Key
* – Number-one album of the year (Note: Annual charts are sourced from the RMNZ website.)
† – Album of New Zealand origin (Note: Whether or not a song is of New Zealand origin is determined by RMNZ)
‡ – Number-one album of the year, of New Zealand origin

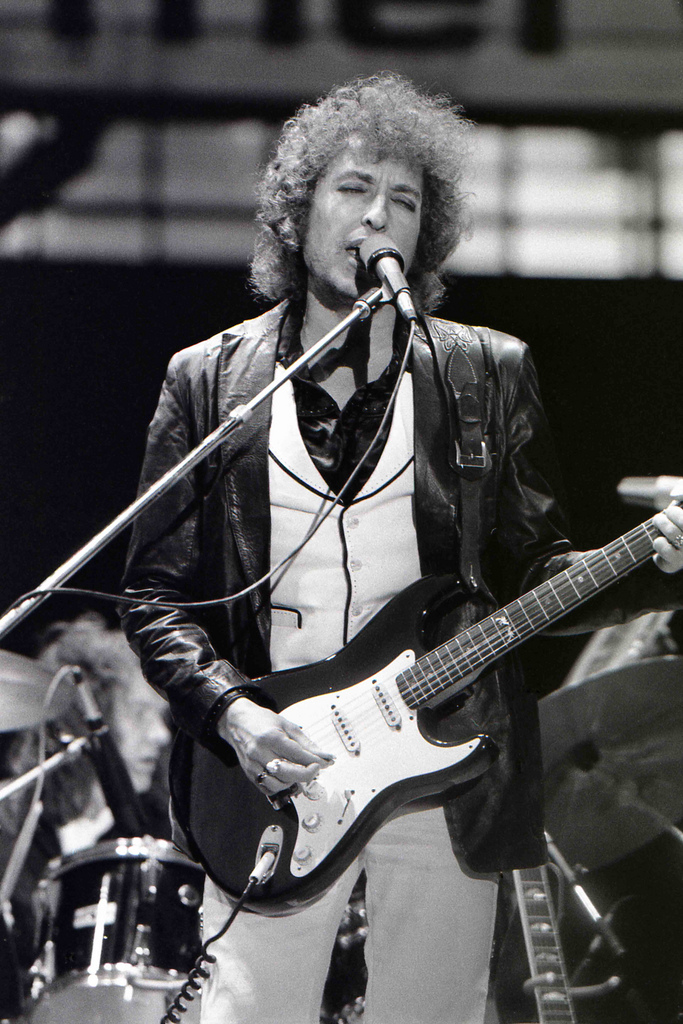
Bob Dylan had the first number one album of the new chart with Blood on the Tracks.

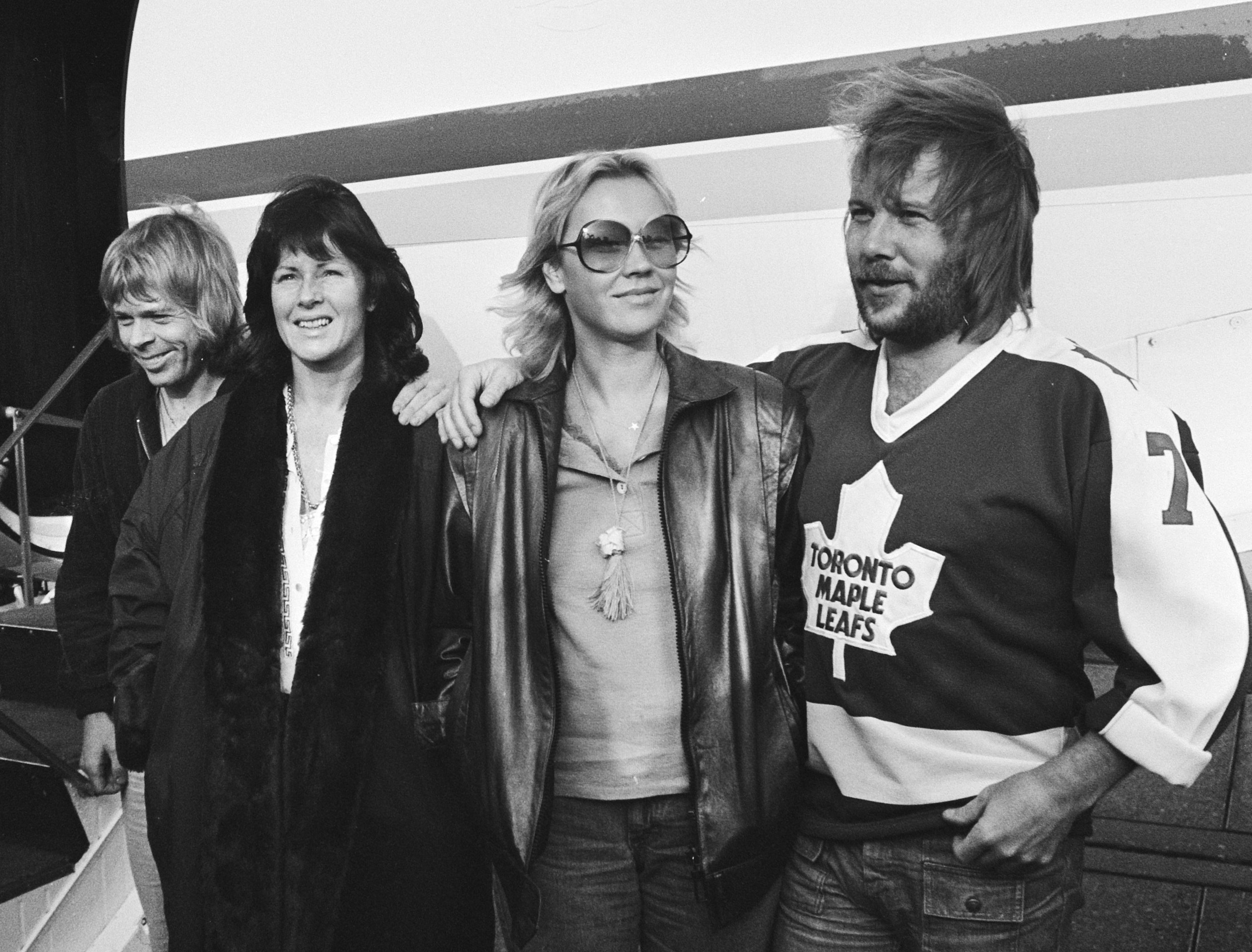
ABBA's album The Best of ABBA was number one for 15 weeks, the longest run of the 1970s.

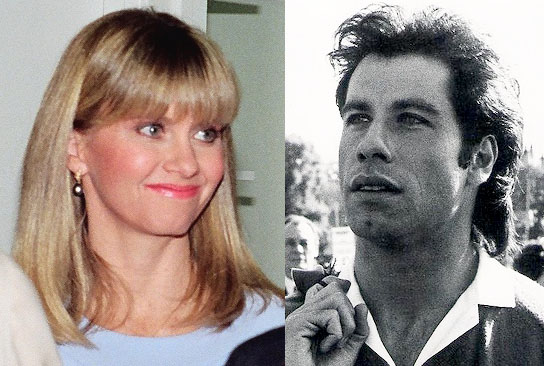
The Grease soundtrack, featuring John Travolta and Olivia Newton-John, charted at No. 1 for 16 weeks in 1978.

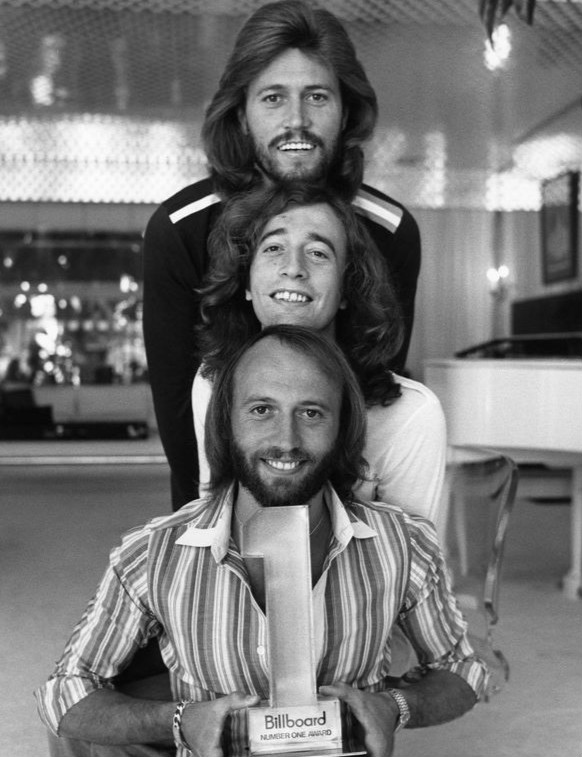
The soundtrack for Saturday Night Fever, primarily written by The Bee Gees, charted at No, 1 for 15 weeks in 1978.

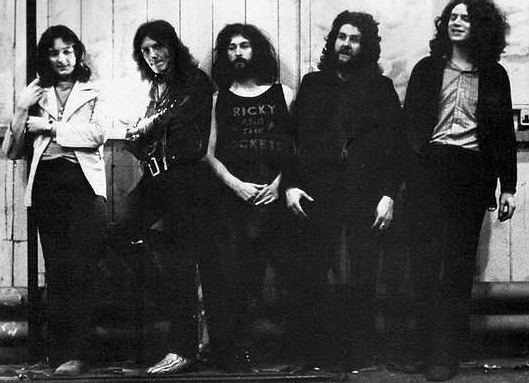
Supertramp's album Breakfast in America was No.1 for 10 weeks.

Artist	Album	Weeks at number one	Reached number one
Bob Dylan	Blood on the Tracks	3	2 May 1975
Rick Wakeman	The Myths and Legends of King Arthur and the Knights of the Round Table	3	23 May 1975
John Denver	An Evening with John Denver	1	13 June 1975
Rick Wakeman	The Myths and Legends of King Arthur and the Knights of the Round Table	1	20 June 1975
John Denver	An Evening with John Denver	1	27 June 1975
Elton John	Captain Fantastic and the Brown Dirt Cowboy	5	4 July 1975
Wings	Venus and Mars	1	8 August 1975
Roger Whittaker	The Very Best of Roger Whittaker	8	15 August 1975
Helen Reddy	Helen Reddy's Greatest Hits	3	10 October 1975
Pink Floyd	Wish You Were Here	3	31 October 1975
Helen Reddy	Helen Reddy's Greatest Hits	3	21 November 1975
Freddy Fender	Before the Next Teardrop Falls	2	12 December 1975
Summer break – no chart (1 week)
Artist	Album	Weeks at number one	Reached number one
Summer break – no chart (4 weeks)
The Doobie Brothers	Listen to the Music: The Best of the Doobie Brothers	3	30 January 1976
ABBA	The Best of ABBA	1	20 February 1976
Neil Diamond	Hot August Night	1	27 February 1976
Bill & Boyd	Bill & Boyd^{‡}	1	5 March 1976
Queen	A Night at the Opera	3	12 March 1976
10cc	How Dare You!	1	2 April 1976
Queen	A Night at the Opera	2	9 April 1976
Easter holiday – no chart (1 week)
ABBA	The Best of ABBA	15	30 April 1976
Neil Diamond	Beautiful Noise	6	13 August 1976
Rod Stewart	A Night on the Town	1	24 September 1976
ABBA	The Best of ABBA	1	1 October 1976
Rod Stewart	A Night on the Town	5	8 October 1976
ABBA	The Best of ABBA	1	12 November 1976
New Zealand Symphony Orchestra	The World's Great Classics^{‡}	1	19 November 1976
ABBA	Arrival	4	26 November 1976
Summer break – no chart (2 weeks)
Artist	Album	Weeks at number one	Reached number one
Summer break – no chart (5 weeks)
ABBA	Arrival	1	13 February 1977
Eagles	Hotel California	2	20 February 1977
Rod Stewart	A Night on the Town	3	6 March 1977
Pink Floyd	Animals	3	27 March 1977
Easter holiday – no chart (1 week)
Eagles	Hotel California	1	24 April 1977
Barbra Streisand / Kris Kristofferson	A Star Is Born	1	1 May 1977
Neil Diamond	Love at the Greek	1	8 May 1977
Various artists	Masterpiece	2	15 May 1977
Various artists	Disco Magic	1	29 May 1977
Barbra Streisand / Kris Kristofferson	A Star Is Born	8	5 June 1977
Bee Gees	Here at Last... Bee Gees... Live	5	31 July 1977
Fleetwood Mac	Rumours	1	4 September 1977
Pussycat	Souvenirs	2	11 September 1977
Elvis Presley	Moody Blue	4	25 September 1977
Fleetwood Mac	Rumours	4	23 October 1977
Rod Stewart	Foot Loose & Fancy Free	2	20 November 1977
Fleetwood Mac	Rumours	3	4 December 1977
Summer break – no chart (1 week)
Artist	Album	Weeks at number one	Reached number one
Summer break – no chart (4 weeks)
Rod Stewart	Foot Loose & Fancy Free	1	29 January 1978
Fleetwood Mac	Rumours	1	5 February 1978
ABBA	ABBA: The Album	5	12 February 1978
Neil Diamond	I'm Glad You're Here with Me Tonight		19 March 1978
Soundtrack	Saturday Night Fever	1	26 March 1978
Easter holiday – no chart (1 week)
Soundtrack	Saturday Night Fever	13	9 April 1978
Kamahl	Kamahl	1	9 July 1978
The Rolling Stones	Some Girls	2	16 July 1978
Soundtrack	FM	1	30 July 1978
Soundtrack	Saturday Night Fever	1	6 August 1978
Soundtrack	Grease: The Original Soundtrack from the Motion Picture	3	13 August 1978
Meat Loaf	Bat Out of Hell	1	3 September 1978
Soundtrack	Grease: The Original Soundtrack from the Motion Picture	13	10 September 1978
David Bowie	Stage	2	10 December 1978
Summer break – no chart (2 weeks)
Artist	Album	Weeks at number one	Reached number one
Summer break – no chart (2 weeks)
Billy Joel	52nd Street	2	21 January 1979
Barbra Streisand	Greatest Hits Vol. 2	4	4 February 1979
Rod Stewart	Blondes Have More Fun	3	4 March 1979
Bee Gees	Spirits Having Flown	4	25 March 1979
Easter holiday – no chart (1 week)
Various artists	Don't Walk, Boogie	5	25 April 1979
Supertramp	Breakfast in America	4	3 June 1979
Leo Sayer	The Very Best of Leo Sayer	1	1 July 1979
Supertramp	Breakfast in America	4	6 July 1979
Dire Straits	Communiqué	2	5 August 1979
Supertramp	Breakfast in America	1	19 August 1979
Art Garfunkel	Fate for Breakfast	1	26 August 1979
Led Zeppelin	In Through the Out Door	2	2 September 1979
Supertramp	Breakfast in America	1	16 September 1979
Led Zeppelin	In Through the Out Door	1	23 September 1979
Bob Dylan	Slow Train Coming	2	30 September 1979
Various artists	Don't Walk, Boogie On	4	14 October 1979
Rod Stewart	Greatest Hits, Vol. 1	6	11 November 1979
Pink Floyd	The Wall	1	23 December 1979
Summer break – no chart (1 week)
Artist	Album	Weeks at number one	Reached number one

== Notes ==
^‡ This album is of New Zealand origin
