= New Zealand top 50 albums of 2018 =

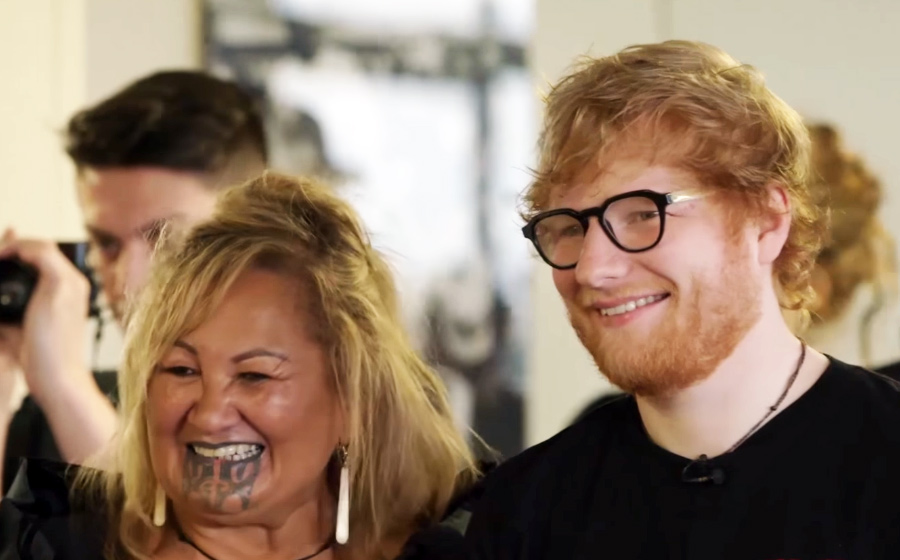
British singer Ed Sheeran's ÷ was the best performing album of the year

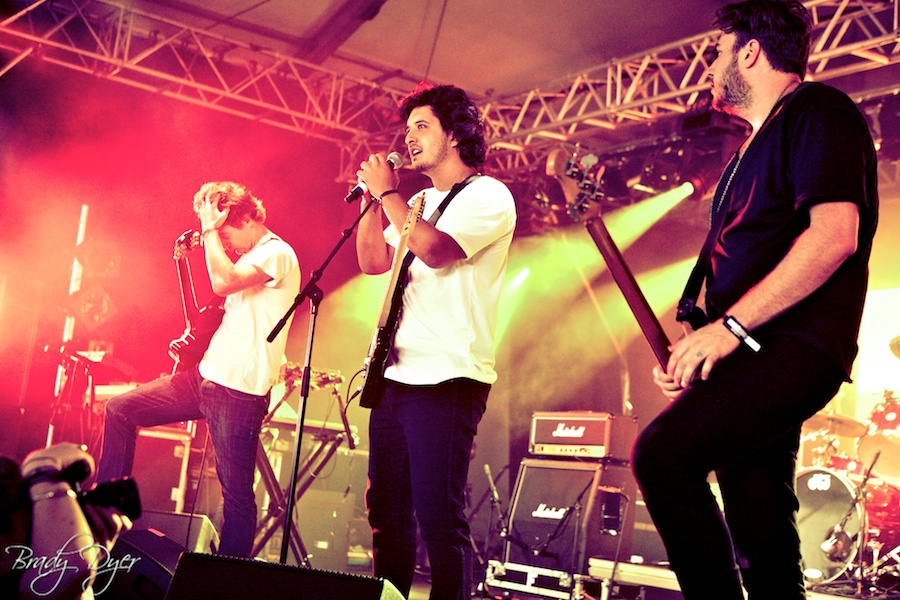
Six 60 EP by Six60 was the best performing album by a New Zealand musician in 2018

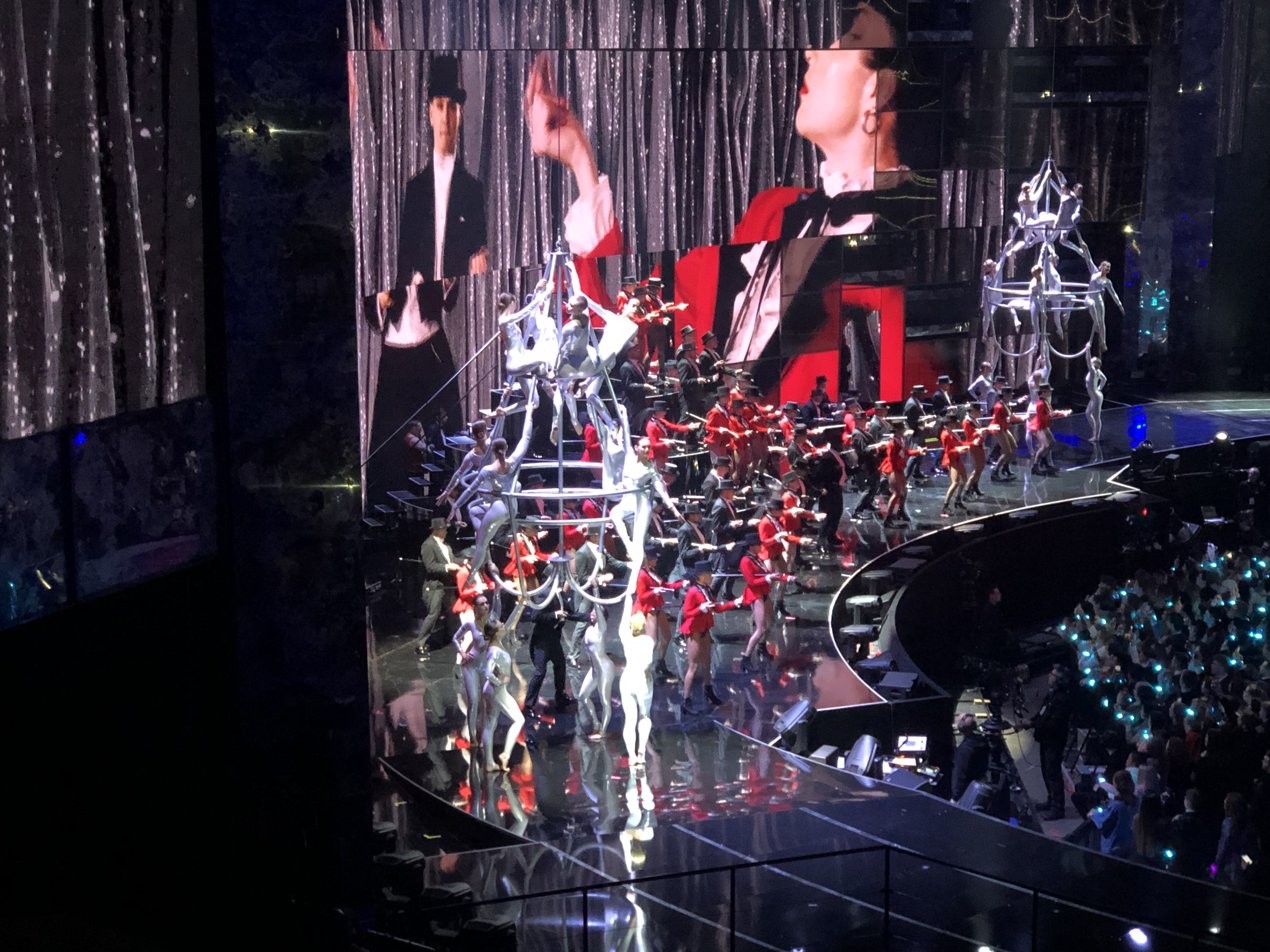
The soundtrack to the film The Greatest Showman (2017) was the second best performing album of the year

This is a list of the top-selling albums in New Zealand for 2018 from the Official New Zealand Music Chart's end-of-year chart, compiled by Recorded Music NZ. Recorded Music NZ also published a list for the top 20 albums released by New Zealand artists.

== Chart ==
Key
† – Album of New Zealand origin (Note: Whether or not a song is of New Zealand origin is determined by the RIANZ.)

| Rank | Artist | Title |
|---|---|---|
| 1 | Ed Sheeran | ÷ |
| 2 | Various Artists | The Greatest Showman: Original Motion Picture Soundtrack |
| 3 | Six60 | Six60 EP |
| 4 | Lady Gaga and Bradley Cooper | A Star Is Born |
| 5 | Post Malone | Beerbongs & Bentleys |
| 6 | Drake | Scorpion |
| 7 | XXXTentacion | ? |
| 8 | Eminem | Kamikaze |
| 9 | Pink | Beautiful Trauma |
| 10 | Post Malone | Stoney |
| 11 | Queen | Bohemian Rhapsody: The Original Soundtrack |
| 12 | Six60 | Six60 (2) |
| 13 | Ed Sheeran | x |
| 14 | Various Artists | Black Panther: The Album |
| 15 | XXXTentacion | 17 |
| 16 | Bruno Mars | 24K Magic: Deluxe Edition |
| 17 | Billie Eilish | Don't Smile at Me |
| 18 | Taylor Swift | Reputation |
| 19 | Imagine Dragons | Evolve |
| 20 | Sam Smith | The Thrill of It All |
| 21 | Mamma Mia! film cast | Mamma Mia! Here We Go Again: The Movie Soundtrack |
| 22 | Cardi B | Invasion of Privacy |
| 23 | Khalid | American Teen |
| 24 | Michael Bublé | Christmas: Deluxe Special Edition |
| 25 | Kendrick Lamar | Damn |
| 26 | Shawn Mendes | Shawn Mendes |
| 27 | Ariana Grande | Sweetener |
| 28 | Michael Bublé | Love |
| 29 | Dennis Marsh | Backyard Party |
| 30 | Pink | Greatest Hits... So Far!!! |
| 31 | Chris Brown | Heartbreak on a Full Moon |
| 32 | Camila Cabello | Camila |
| 33 | Dua Lipa | Dua Lipa |
| 34 | Travis Scott | Astroworld |
| 35 | J. Cole | KOD |
| 36 | Lorde | Melodrama |
| 37 | Adele | 25 |
| 38 | Eminem | Revival |
| 39 | George Ezra | Staying at Tamara's |
| 40 | Queen | Greatest Hits |
| 41 | Migos | Culture II |
| 42 | Elton John | Diamonds |
| 43 | Various Artists | Moana: Original Motion Picture Soundtrack |
| 44 | Kendrick Lamar | Good Kid, M.A.A.D City |
| 45 | Foo Fighters | Greatest Hits |
| 46 | Marlon Williams | Make Way for Love |
| 47 | Queen | The Platinum Collection |
| 48 | Green Day | Greatest Hits: God's Favorite Band |
| 49 | Kanye West | Ye |
| 50 | Andrea Bocelli | Sì |

== Top 20 albums by New Zealand artists ==
| Rank | Artist | Title |
|---|---|---|
| 1 | Six60 | Six60 EP |
| 2 | Six60 | Six60 (2) |
| 3 | Dennis Marsh | Backyard Party |
| 4 | Lorde | Melodrama |
| 5 | Various Artists | Moana: Original Motion Picture Soundtrack |
| 6 | Marlon Williams | Make Way for Love |
| 7 | Sol3 Mio | A Very M3rry Christmas |
| 8 | Mitch James | Mitch James |
| 9 | Katchafire | Legacy |
| 10 | L.A.B. | L.A.B. |
| 11 | Drax Project | Noon |
| 12 | Tami Neilson | Sassafrass! |
| 13 | Tomorrow People | BBQ Reggae |
| 14 | Avantdale Bowling Club | Avantdale Bowling Club |
| 15 | Salmonella Dub | Commercial Grates |
| 16 | Alien Weaponry | Tū |
| 17 | Gin Wigmore | Ivory |
| 18 | Unknown Mortal Orchestra | Sex & Food |
| 19 | Sons of Zion | Vantage Point |
| 20 | Aldous Harding | Party |
