= New Zealand top 50 albums of 2024 =

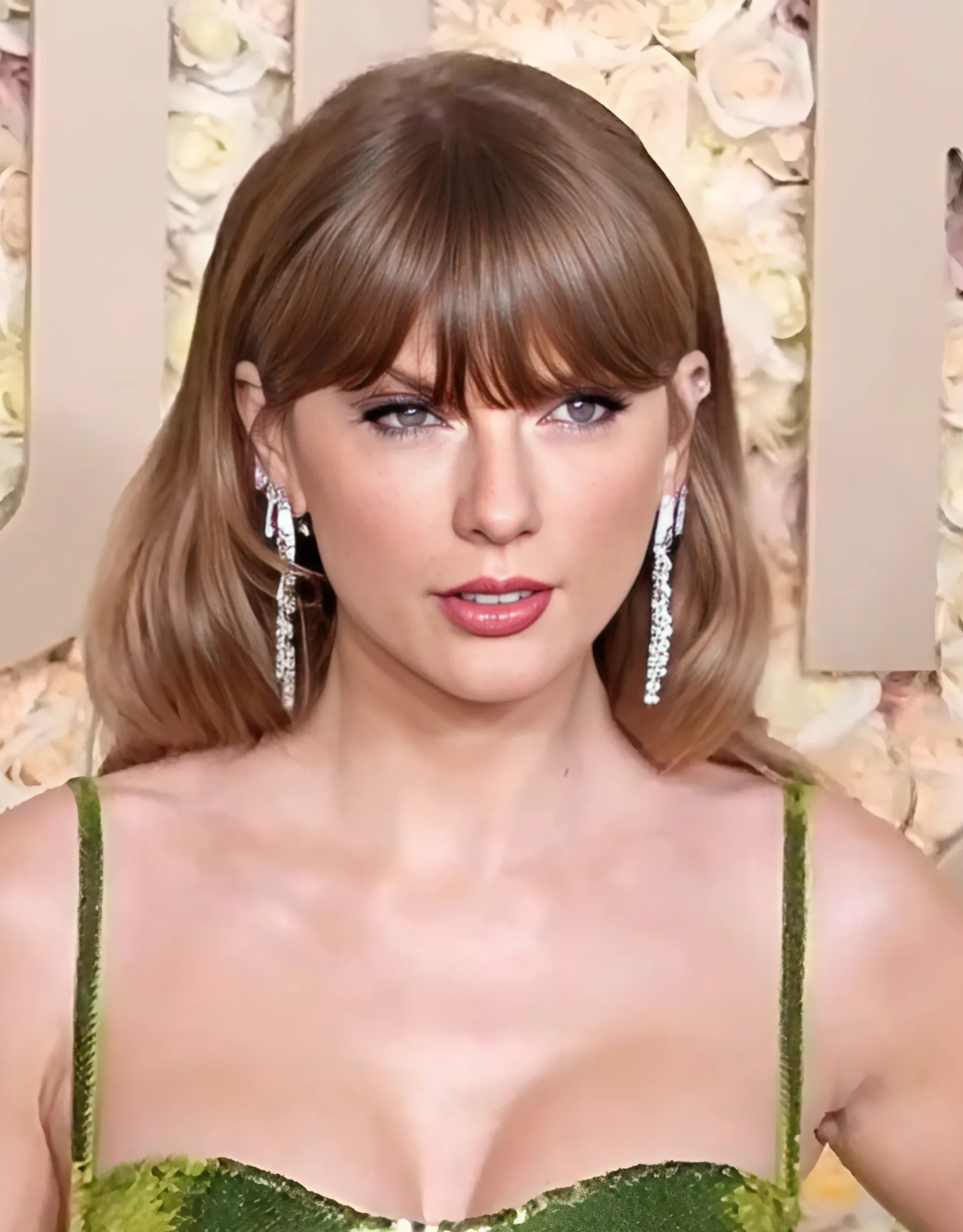
American singer Taylor Swift released the top performing album of the year, The Tortured Poets Department. Four albums by Swift featured among the top performing albums of 2024.

This is a list of the top-selling albums in New Zealand for 2024 from the Official New Zealand Music Chart's end-of-year chart, compiled by Recorded Music NZ. Recorded Music NZ also published a list for the top 20 albums released by New Zealand artists.

== Chart ==
Key
† – Album of New Zealand origin (Note: Whether or not a song is of New Zealand origin is determined by Recorded Music NZ.)

Rank	Artist	Title
1	Taylor Swift	The Tortured Poets Department
2	Billie Eilish	Hit Me Hard and Soft
3	SZA	SOS
4	Sabrina Carpenter	Short n' Sweet
5	Chappell Roan	The Rise and Fall of a Midwest Princess
6	L.A.B.	Introducing L.A.B.
7	Morgan Wallen	One Thing at a Time
8	Taylor Swift	1989 (Taylor's Version)
9	Noah Kahan	Stick Season (Forever)
10	Olivia Rodrigo	Guts (Spilled)
11	Ariana Grande	Eternal Sunshine
12	Post Malone	The Diamond Collection
13	Taylor Swift	Midnights
14	Linkin Park	Papercuts
15	Travis Scott	Utopia
16	Six60	The Six60 Collection
17	Bob Marley And The Wailers	Bob Marley: One Love (soundtrack)
18	Charli XCX	Brat
19	Maoli	Maoli Music Overload
20	Gracie Abrams	The Secret of Us
21	Eminem	The Death of Slim Shady (Coup de Grâce)
22	Metro Boomin	Heroes and Villains
23	Eminem	Curtain Call 2
24	Fred Again...	USB
25	Benson Boone	Fireworks & Rollerblades
26	L.A.B.	L.A.B. VI
27	Sam Smith	In the Lonely Hour: 10th Anniversary Edition
28	Sons of Zion	First XV
29	21 Savage	American Dream
30	Zach Bryan	Zach Bryan
31	Tate McRae	Think Later
32	Drake	For all the Dogs
33	Kanye West and Ty Dolla $ign	Vultures 1
34	Foo Fighters	The Essential Foo Fighters
35	Jonas Brothers	The Family Business
36	The Eagles	To The Limit: The Essential Collection
37	Chris Brown	11:11
38	Teddy Swims	I've Tried Everything But Therapy (Part 1.5)
39	Taylor Swift	Speak Now (Taylor's Version)
40	Future and Metro Boomin	We Don't Trust You
41	Nicki Minaj	Pink Friday 2
42	Tyler, the Creator	Chromakopia
43	Beyoncé	Cowboy Carter
44	Ed Sheeran	+-=÷× (Tour Collection)
45	Nicki Minaj	Queen Radio: Volume 1
46	The Killers	Rebel Diamonds
47	Pink Floyd	Dark Side of the Moon
48	Brent Faiyaz	Wasteland
49	Luke Combs	Gettin' Old
50	Hozier	Unreal Unearth: Unheard

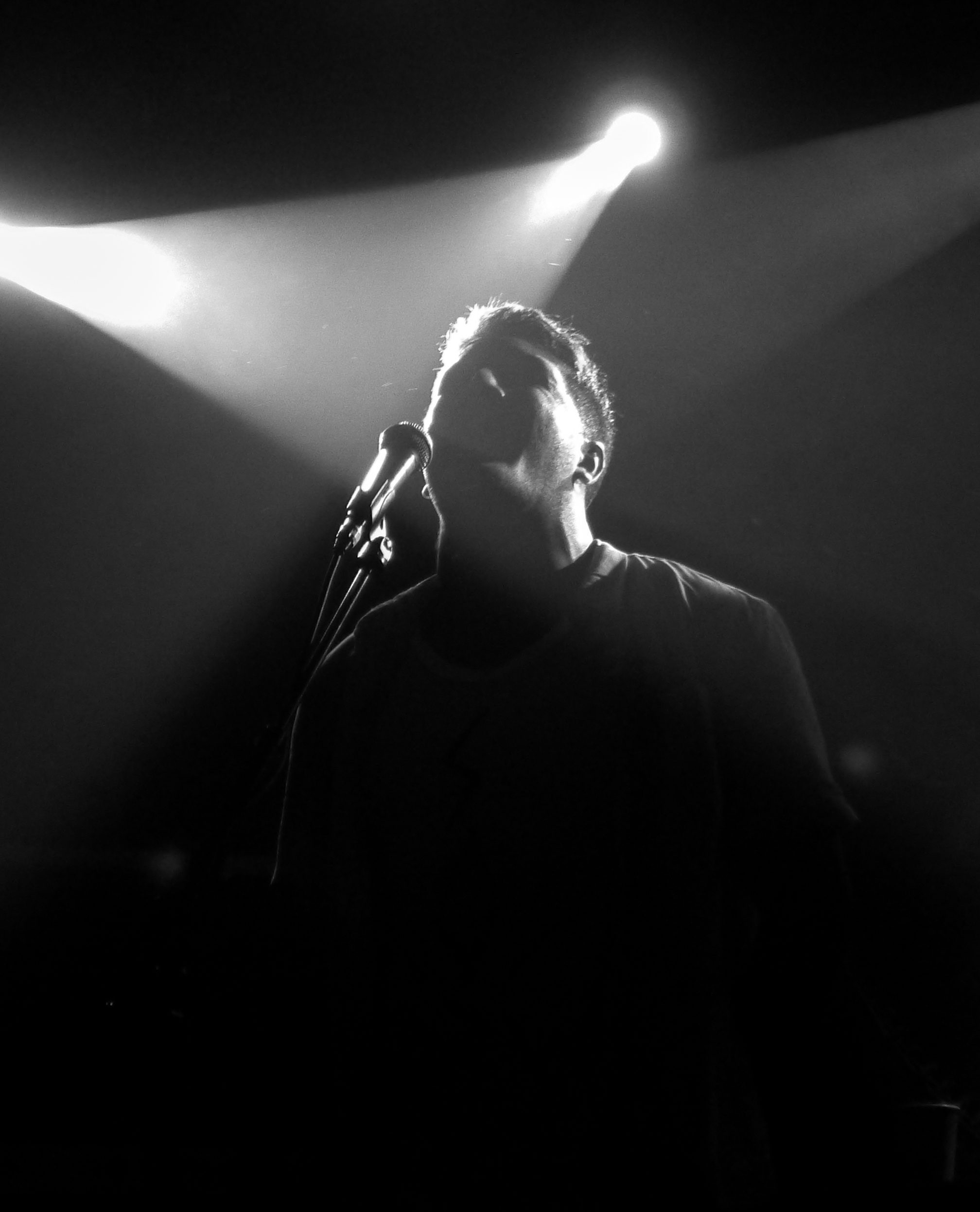
Three albums by New Zealand band Six60 featured among the top performing New Zealand albums of 2024.

== Top 20 Albums by New Zealand Artists ==
Rank	Artist	Title
1	L.A.B.	Introducing L.A.B.
2	Six60	The Six60 Collection
3	L.A.B.	L.A.B. VI
4	Sons of Zion	First XV
5	Coterie	Coterie
6	Home Brew	Run It Back
7	Kaylee Bell	Nights Like This
8	Stan Walker	All In
9	NZ Highwaymen	Live from the James Hay Theatre
10	DARTZ	Dangerous Day to be a Cold One
11	Fat Freddy's Drop	Slo Mo
12	Mel Parsons	Sabotage
13	Six60	The Grassroots Album
14	Corrella	Road from 26
15	Various Artists	Waiata / Anthems
16	The Black Seeds	On The Sun
17	Georgia Lines	The Rose of Jericho
18	Six60	Castle St
19	Devilskin	Surfacing EP
20	No Cigar	The Great Escape
