= New Zealand top 50 albums of 2010 =

This is a list of the top selling albums in New Zealand for 2010.

== Chart ==
Key
‡ – Album of New Zealand origin

Rank	Artist	Title
1	Susan Boyle	The Gift
2	Susan Boyle	I Dreamed a Dream
3	Gin Wigmore	Holy Smoke^{‡}
4	Justin Bieber	My Worlds: The Collection
5	Eminem	Recovery
6	Brooke Fraser	Flags^{‡}
7	Lady Gaga	The Fame Monster
8	Katy Perry	Teenage Dream
9	Ronan Keating	Duet
10	Slash	Slash
11	Stan Walker	Introducing^{‡}
12	Pink	Greatest Hits... So Far!!!
13	Bon Jovi	Greatest Hits – The Ultimate Collection
14	Adam Lambert	For Your Entertainment
15	Taylor Swift	Speak Now
16	Kings of Leon	Come Around Sundown
17	Lady Antebellum	Need You Now
18	Stan Walker	From the Inside Out^{‡}
19	Florence and the Machine	Lungs
20	Mumford & Sons	Sigh No More
21	Alvin and the Chipmunks	Alvin and the Chipmunks: The Squeakquel: OST
22	Altiyan Childs	Altiyan Childs
23	James Blunt	Some Kind of Trouble
24	AC/DC	Iron Man 2 OST
25	Rihanna	Loud
26	Bruno Mars	Doo-Wops & Hooligans
27	Disturbed	Asylum
28	Dane Rumble	The Experiment^{‡}
29	Cast of Glee	Glee: The Music, Volume 2
30	Kesha	Animal
31	Taylor Swift	Fearless
32	Cast of Glee	Glee: The Music, Volume 3 Showstoppers
33	Michael Bublé	Crazy Love
34	Linkin Park	A Thousand Suns
35	Josh Groban	Illuminations
36	Katchafire	On the Road Again^{‡}
37	Cast of Glee	Glee: The Music, Volume 4
38	Phil Collins	Going Back
39	The Naked and Famous	Passive Me, Aggressive You^{‡}
40	Jack Johnson	To the Sea
41	J.Williams	Young Love^{‡}
42	Cat Stevens	The Very Best of Cat Stevens
43	Queen	Absolute Greatest
44	Shapeshifter	The System Is a Vampire^{‡}
45	Muse	The Resistance
46	Michael Jackson	This Is It
47	Paramore	Brand New Eyes
48	The Phoenix Foundation	Buffalo^{‡}
49	The Black Eyed Peas	The E.N.D.
50	Dragon	The Very Best of Dragon^{‡}
