= List of number-one singles in 1961 (New Zealand) =

This is a list of Number 1 hit singles in 1961 in New Zealand from the Lever Hit Parade.

== Chart ==
Week	Title	Artist
5 January 1961	"Save the Last Dance for Me"	The Drifters
12 January 1961	"Save the Last Dance for Me"	The Drifters
19 January 1961	"Save the Last Dance for Me"	The Drifters
26 January 1961	"Poetry In Motion"	Johnny Tillotson
2 February 1961	"As Long As He Needs Me"	Shirley Bassey
9 February 1961	"Are You Lonesome Tonight?"	Elvis Presley
16 February 1961	"Last Date"	Floyd Cramer
23 February 1961	"Last Date"	Floyd Cramer
2 March 1961	"Wonderland by Night"	Bert Kaempfert
9 March 1961	"Wonderland by Night"	Bert Kaempfert
16 March 1961	"I Love You"	Cliff Richard
23 March 1961	"Sailor"	Petula Clark
30 March 1961	"Surrender"	Elvis Presley
6 April 1961	"Surrender"	Elvis Presley
13 April 1961	"Walk Right Back"	The Everly Brothers
20 April 1961	"Walk Right Back"	The Everly Brothers
27 April 1961	"Are You Sure?"	The Allisons
4 May 1961	"Are You Sure?"	The Allisons
11 May 1961	"Exodus"	Ferrante & Teicher
18 May 1961	"Blue Moon"	The Marcels
25 May 1961	"Exodus"	Ferrante & Teicher
1 June 1961	"Blue Moon"	The Marcels
8 June 1961	"Calcutta"	Lawrence Welk
15 June 1961	"Runaway"	Del Shannon
22 June 1961	"Runaway"	Del Shannon
29 June 1961	"Running Scared"	Roy Orbison
6 July 1961	"Running Scared"	Roy Orbison
13 July 1961	"Travelin' Man"	Ricky Nelson
20 July 1961	"Moody River"	Pat Boone
27 July 1961	"Travelin' Man"	Ricky Nelson
3 August 1961	"Boll Weevil Song"	Brook Benton
10 August 1961	"Boll Weevil Song"	Brook Benton
17 August 1961	"Raindrops"	Dee Clark
24 August 1961	"Raindrops"	Dee Clark
31 August 1961	"Dum Dum"	Brenda Lee
7 September 1961	"Well I Ask You"	Eden Kane
14 September 1961	"Well I Ask You"	Eden Kane
21 September 1961	"Michael Row the Boat Ashore"	The Highwaymen
28 September 1961	"Michael Row the Boat Ashore"	The Highwaymen
5 October 1961	"You Don't Know"	Helen Shapiro
12 October 1961	"You Don't Know"	Helen Shapiro
19 October 1961	"Michael Row the Boat Ashore"	The Highwaymen
26 October 1961	"Take Good Care of My Baby"	Bobby Vee
2 November 1961	"Take Good Care of My Baby"	Bobby Vee
9 November 1961	"Johnny Remember Me"	John Leyton
16 November 1961	"Big Bad John"	Jimmy Dean
23 November 1961	"Walkin' Back to Happiness"	Helen Shapiro
30 November 1961	"Hit the Road Jack"	Ray Charles
7 December 1961	"Big Bad John"	Jimmy Dean
14 December 1961	"Walkin' Back to Happiness"	Helen Shapiro
21 December 1961	"Moon River"	Jerry Butler
28 December 1961	"Moon River"	Jerry Butler
