= New Zealand top 50 singles of 2007 =

This is a list of the top 50 singles in 2007 in New Zealand, as listed by the Recording Industry Association of New Zealand (RIANZ).

== Chart ==
Key
† – Song of New Zealand origin (Note: Whether or not a song is of New Zealand origin is determined by the RIANZ)

Rank	Artist	Title
1	Rihanna featuring Jay-Z	"Umbrella"
2	Fergie	"Big Girls Don't Cry"
3	Timbaland featuring Keri Hilson	"The Way I Are"
4	T-Pain featuring Yung Joc	"Buy U a Drank (Shawty Snappin')"
5	T-Pain featuring Akon	"Bartender"
6	Atlas	"Crawl"†
7	Ne-Yo	"Because of You"
8	Gwen Stefani featuring Akon	"The Sweet Escape"
9	Timbaland featuring OneRepublic	"Apologize"
10	Sean Kingston	"Beautiful Girls"
11	Opshop	"Maybe"†
12	Akon	"Don't Matter"
13	Timbaland featuring Nelly Furtado and Justin Timberlake	"Give It To Me"
14	Avril Lavigne	"Girlfriend"
15	Christina Aguilera	"Candyman"
16	Mika	"Grace Kelly"
17	Chris Brown featuring T-Pain	"Kiss Kiss"
18	Hinder	"Lips of an Angel"
19	Alicia Keys	"No One"
20	R. Kelly featuring Usher	"Same Girl"
21	Linkin Park	"What I've Done"
22	Nelly Furtado	"Say It Right"
23	Bone Thugs-n-Harmony featuring Akon	"I Tried"
24	Pink	"Leave Me Alone (I'm Lonely)"
25	Justin Timberlake	"What Goes Around.../...Comes Around"
26	Gwen Stefani	"4 in the Morning"
27	Akon featuring Snoop Dogg	"I Wanna Love You"
28	Fall Out Boy	"This Ain't a Scene, It's an Arms Race"
29	50 Cent featuring Justin Timberlake and Timbaland	"Ayo Technology"
30	T.I.	"Big Things Poppin' (Do It)"
31	Akon featuring Eminem	"Smack That"
32	Colbie Caillat	"Bubbly"
33	Fergie featuring Ludacris	"Glamorous"
34	Plain White T's	"Hey There Delilah"
35	My Chemical Romance	"Teenagers"
36	Maroon 5	"Makes Me Wonder"
37	Beyoncé Knowles featuring Shakira	"Beautiful Liar"
38	The Fray	"How to Save a Life"
39	Snow Patrol	"Chasing Cars"
40	Bow Wow featuring T-Pain and Johntá Austin	"Outta My System"
41	Fall Out Boy	"Thnks fr th Mmrs"
42	Kanye West	"Stronger"
43	Silverchair	"Straight Lines"
44	The Red Jumpsuit Apparatus	"Face Down"
45	Gym Class Heroes	"Cupid's Chokehold"
46	Soulja Boy	"Crank That"
47	Akon	"Sorry, Blame It on Me"
48	Rihanna featuring Ne-Yo	"Hate That I Love You"
49	Fergie	"Clumsy"
50	Huey	"Pop, Lock & Drop It"
