= List of number-one singles in 1966 (New Zealand) =

This is a list of number-one hit singles in 1966 in New Zealand, starting with the first chart dated, 25 March 1966.

== Chart ==
Week	Artist	Title
25 March 1966	Herman's Hermits	"A Must to Avoid"
1 April 1966	Herman's Hermits	"A Must to Avoid"
8 April 1966	Nancy Sinatra	"These Boots Are Made for Walkin'"
15 April 1966	Nancy Sinatra	"These Boots Are Made for Walkin'"
22 April 1966	Overlanders	"Michelle"
29 April 1966	Simon & Garfunkel	"Homeward Bound"
6 May 1966	Overlanders	"Michelle"
13 May 1966	Simon & Garfunkel	"Homeward Bound"
20 May 1966	Simon & Garfunkel	"Homeward Bound"
27 May 1966	Simon & Garfunkel	"Homeward Bound"
3 June 1966	The Kinks	"Dedicated Follower of Fashion"
10 June 1966	The Kinks	"Dedicated Follower of Fashion"
17 June 1966	The Kinks	"Dedicated Follower of Fashion"
24 June 1966	The Beach Boys	"Sloop John B"
1 July 1966	The Beach Boys	"Sloop John B"
8 July 1966	The Beatles	"Paperback Writer"
15 July 1966	The Beatles	"Paperback Writer"
22 July 1966	The Beatles	"Paperback Writer"
29 July 1966	Manfred Mann	"Pretty Flamingo"
5 August 1966	Manfred Mann	"Pretty Flamingo"
12 August 1966	Manfred Mann	"Pretty Flamingo"
19 August 1966	The Lovin' Spoonful	"Daydream"
26 August 1966	The Lovin' Spoonful	"Daydream"
2 September 1966	The Lovin' Spoonful	"Daydream"
9 September 1966	The Troggs	"Wild Thing"
16 September 1966	The Troggs	"Wild Thing"
23 September 1966	The Beatles	"Yellow Submarine"
30 September 1966	The Beatles	"Yellow Submarine"
7 October 1966	The Beatles	"Yellow Submarine"
14 October 1966	The Beatles	"Eleanor Rigby"
21 October 1966	The Troggs	"With a Girl Like You"
28 October 1966	The Troggs	"With a Girl Like You"
4 November 1966	The Troggs	"With a Girl Like You"
11 November 1966	Tommy Roe	"Sweet Pea"
18 November 1966	Tommy Roe	"Sweet Pea"
25 November 1966	Peter & Gordon	"Lady Godiva"
1 December 1966	Peter & Gordon	"Lady Godiva"
8 December 1966	Peter & Gordon	"Lady Godiva"
15 December 1966	The Hollies	"Stop! Stop! Stop!"
22 December 1966	The Hollies	"Stop! Stop! Stop!"
29 December 1966	The Hollies	"Stop! Stop! Stop!"
