= Martin Winch =

New Zealand musician (1949–2011)

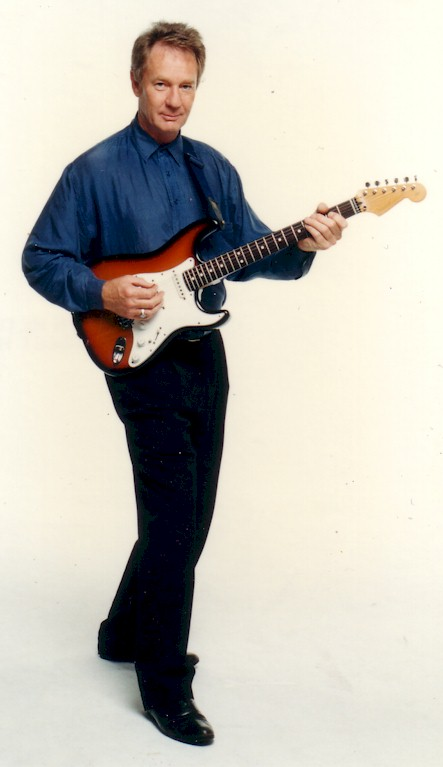
Martin Winch in 1997.

Martin Ronald Winch (28 February 1949 – 21 May 2011) was a New Zealand guitarist, composer and musician.

== Life and career ==
The CD Espresso Guitar is Winch's best-known album. It reached #1 in New Zealand.

Born in Nottingham, England, Martin Winch was 14 when his family immigrated to New Zealand in 1963. They settled on the North Shore in Auckland, where he attended the Northcote College. He would later tell that as a young boy he became so obsessed with his younger brother Rob's guitar, that he couldn't simply put it down.

During the late 1970s, his time with the 1860 Band and The Rodger Fox Big Band in Wellington helped Winch to become the brilliant jazz stylist that he was. Prior to that he worked with club bands such as The Crypt and Circa 1973 in the Auckland City. More so, he was an outstanding all rounder in a career spanning four decades. In a buoyant NZ music scene of the 1970s, 1980s and much of the 1990s, Winch played in club bands, backed international artists such as Randy Crawford, Shirley Bassey, Elaine Paige, and Roger Whittaker, made orchestral calls, concerts, soundtracks and commercial recording and teaching – all the while writing and recording his own material.

Winch played with an array of blues, pop and jazz artists from New Zealand and abroad, toured with musicals such as Chicago, Jesus Christ Superstar and My Fair Lady, lent his fine touch to hundreds of local albums and jammed with Nigel Kennedy

Winch's most famous album, Espresso Guitar sold over 80,000 copies in New Zealand alone. Musical arrangement was done by another famous New Zealand musician, Pianist Carl Doy who also produced it. Espresso Guitar enjoyed the number 1 spot on the NZ charts for several weeks, and found wider popularity in Australia and Asia. He released five albums of his own; among which Music for Coffee Lovers was another hit.

Winch's favourite instrument was jazz guitar, but he was equally adept at rock, blue, acoustic and electric guitar.

Martin Winch's legacy extends beyond the great musician he was. He was a composer and engineer, teacher and also mentor to many a young players in New Zealand's music industry, particularly in the Auckland music scene. He was a well known teacher at the School of Music of the University of Auckland where he tutored for five years.

In recognition of his work spanning over 40 years, the New Zealand Herald in 1999 named Winch one of the Top 10 guitarists New Zealand ever produced.

Martin Winch died of cancer at the age of 62 on 21 May 2011.

== Quotations ==
"I’m a working musician on a journey. I play different styles. That’s what I always wanted. I never saw myself as an entertainer, just a musician".

"The biggest deal for me was working with Randy Crawford. I really like what she did".

== Discography ==
=== Albums ===
List of albums, with selected details and chart positions
Title	Details	Peak chart positions		Sales
Title	Details	NZ	AUS	Sales
Sahara (Sahara featuring Martin Winch)	Released: 1984; Label: RCA Victor	—	—	
Martin Winch	Released: 1986; Label: Kiwi	—	—	
Espresso Guitar	Released: 1998; Label: Thom Marketing	1	99	NZ: 100,000
Espresso Guitar Two	Released: 2000; Label: Thom Marketing	3	—	
An Evening with Friends	Released: 2003 (UK); Label: Marks & Spencer	—	—	
Guitar Song	Released: 2004; Label: Columbia	—	—	
