= List of number-one singles in 1963 (New Zealand) =

This is a list of number-one hit singles in 1963 in New Zealand from the Lever Hit Parade.

== Chart ==
Week	Artist	Title
3 January 1963	The Four Seasons	"Big Girls Don't Cry"
10 January 1963	Frank Ifield	"Lovesick Blues"
17 January 1963	The Four Seasons	"Big Girls Don't Cry"
24 January 1963	Chubby Checker	"Limbo Rock"
31 January 1963	Steve Lawrence	"Go Away Little Girl"
7 February 1963	Steve Lawrence	"Go Away Little Girl"
14 February 1963	The Shadows	"The Boys (The Shadows EP)"
21 February 1963	Paul & Paula	"Hey Paula"
28 February 1963	Paul & Paula	"Hey Paula"
7 March 1963	The Rooftop Singers	"Walk Right In"
14 March 1963	The Rooftop Singers	"Walk Right In"
21 March 1963	The Rooftop Singers	"Walk Right In"
28 March 1963	The Four Seasons	"Walk Like a Man"
4 April 1963	Cliff Richard	"Summer Holiday"
11 April 1963	Ruby & The Romantics	"Our Day Will Come"
18 April 1963	Ruby & The Romantics	"Our Day Will Come"
25 April 1963	Andy Williams	"Can't Get Used to Losing You"
2 May 1963	Andy Williams	"Can't Get Used to Losing You"
9 May 1963	Little Peggy March	"I Will Follow Him"
16 May 1963	Little Peggy March	"I Will Follow Him"
23 May 1963	The Chiffons	"He's So Fine"
30 May 1963	The Chiffons	"He's So Fine"
6 June 1963	Jimmy Soul	"If You Wanna Be Happy"
13 June 1963	Jimmy Soul	"If You Wanna Be Happy"
20 June 1963	The Beatles	"From Me To You"
27 June 1963	Lesley Gore	"It's My Party"
4 July 1963	Lesley Gore	"It's My Party"
11 July 1963	Billy J. Kramer	"Do You Want to Know a Secret"
18 July 1963	Gerry and the Pacemakers	"I Like It"
25 July 1963	Kyu Sakamoto	"Sukiyaki"
1 August 1963	Kyu Sakamoto	"Sukiyaki"
8 August 1963	The Essex	"Easier Said Than Done"
15 August 1963	Frank Ifield	"Confessin'"
22 August 1963	Frank Ifield	"Confessin'"
29 August 1963	The Searchers	"Sweets for My Sweet"
5 September 1963	The Searchers	"Sweets for My Sweet"
12 September 1963	The Angels	"My Boyfriend's Back"
19 September 1963	The Angels	"My Boyfriend's Back"
26 September 1963	Billy J. Kramer	"Bad To Me"
3 October 1963	Allan Sherman	"Hello Muddah Hello Faddah"
10 October 1963	The Beatles	"She Loves You"
17 October 1963	Bobby Vinton	"Blue Velvet"
24 October 1963	Bobby Vinton	"Blue Velvet"
31 October 1963	Bobby Vinton	"Blue Velvet"
7 November 1963	Jimmy Gilmer and The Fireballs	"Sugar Shack"
14 November 1963	Jimmy Gilmer and The Fireballs	"Sugar Shack"
21 November 1963	Jimmy Gilmer and The Fireballs	"Sugar Shack"
28 November 1963	Brian Poole & The Tremeloes	"Do You Love Me?"
5 December 1963	Gerry And The Pacemakers	"You'll Never Walk Alone"
12 December 1963	Nino Tempo & April Stevens	"Deep Purple"
19 December 1963	The Singing Nun	"Dominique"
26 December 1963	The Beatles	"I Want to Hold Your Hand"
