= New Zealand top 50 albums of 2004 =

This is the list of the top 50 albums of 2004 in New Zealand.

== Chart ==
Key
‡ – Album of New Zealand origin

Number	Weeks in Chart	Artist	Album
1	49	Brooke Fraser	What To Do With Daylight^{‡}
2	33	Guns N' Roses	Greatest Hits
3	37	Norah Jones	Feels like Home
4	47	The Black Eyed Peas	Elephunk
5	32	Usher	Confessions
6	41	Amici Forever	Opera Band Special Edition
7	35	Hayley Westenra	Pure^{‡}
8	16	The Finn Brothers	Everyone Is Here^{‡}
9	40	Goldenhorse	Riverhead^{‡}
10	29	Maroon 5	Songs About Jane
11	22	Scribe	The Crusader^{‡}
12	27	Adeaze	Always and for Real^{‡}
13	13	Yulia	Into the West^{‡}
14	34	Evanescence	Fallen
15	37	The Darkness	Permission to Land
16	33	Dido	Life for Rent
17	4	Eminem	Encore
18	32	Outkast	Speakerboxxx/The Love Below
19	28	Bic Runga	Beautiful Collision^{‡}
20	28	Joss Stone	The Soul Sessions
21	22	D12	D12 World
22	11	Green Day	American Idiot
23	31	Linkin Park	Meteora
24	3	U2	How to Dismantle an Atomic Bomb
25	28	Franz Ferdinand	Franz Ferdinand
27	15	Ray Charles	Genius Loves Company
28	24	UB40	Labour of Love, Volumes I, II and III – The Platinum Collection
29	23	Katchafire	Revival^{‡}
30	24	John Butler Trio	Sunrise Over Sea
31	7	Ben Lummis	One Road^{‡}
32	20	Various	Shrek 2 OST
33	14	Incubus	A Crow Left of the Murder
34	17	The Black Seeds	On The Sun^{‡}
35	17	Katie Melua	Call Off The Search
36	17	Jamie Cullum	Twentysomething
37	16	Elemeno P	Love and Disrespect^{‡}
38	8	P-Money	Magic City^{‡}
39	11	Diana Krall	The Girl In The Other Room
40	10	Rod Stewart	The Very Best of Rod Stewart
41	17	The Feelers	Playground Battle^{‡}
42	15	Delta Goodrem	Innocent Eyes
43	11	New Zealand Idol - The Final 10	Homegrown^{‡}
44	9	KoRn	Greatest Hits Vol. 1
45	18	The Streets	A Grand Don't Come for Free
46	14	Josh Groban	Closer
47	13	Red Hot Chili Peppers	Greatest Hits
48	18	Avril Lavigne	Under My Skin
49	17	Jet	Get Born
50	14	Steriogram	Schmack!^{‡}
