= Will Martin =

New Zealand singer

Will Martin (born 31 August 1984) is a New Zealand-born classical crossover singer.

Martin's first album, released in his native New Zealand, went platinum in 6 weeks. The album, called A New World, featured songs such as "Into the West", "If" and "Going Home".

Will commented on his success with "I am an entertainer; I sing, I can play the piano. I want to bring an entertainment factor to this kind of music because it has never really been done before".

"I intend to rock out with a big orchestra behind me. I want to be real. I want to misbehave. I want to reach people. Dress me like a pop star and let me sing, and maybe some eighteen-year-old girl will go out and buy a classical album for the first time".

Martin released his second album titled Inspirations in New Zealand in late November 2010.

In 2011 he performed the France national anthem "La Marseillaise" at Eden Park in Auckland before the final of the 2011 Rugby World Cup.

== Biography ==
Will Martin was born in Wellington, New Zealand, the son of a lawyer and a nurse. He has Māori ancestry on his mother's side. He was brought up in Auckland. The family had no musical tradition, and Martin began singing seriously only in his teens.

In 2007, Martin obtained a five-album deal with Universal Music worth $3 million.

== Discography ==
=== Albums ===
Title	Details	Peak chart positions	Certifications
Title	Details	NZ	Certifications
A New World	Released: 2007; Formats: Digital download; Label: Universal Music	2	RMNZ: Platinum
Inspirations	Released: 15 November 2010; Formats: Digital download; Label: Universal	13	
By Request	Released: 26 April 2019; Formats: Digital download; Label: Universal	12	RMNZ: 4× Platinum

=== Singles ===
Title	Year	Album
"So Far Away"	2008	A New World
"Faraway Place"	2010	Non-album single
