= Kora (album) =

Studio album by Kora
- Released: October 22, 2007
- Genre: Reggae, Dub, Rap rock, Funk metal
- Length: 54:20
- Label: Self Released

Kora chronology
Volume EP (2003)	Kora (2007)	Light Years (2012)

Kora is an album by New Zealand band Kora, released on October 22, 2007. It is a fusion of bass-heavy electronic style reggae incorporating elements of metal, rock and funk.

== Track listing ==
1. "Intro"
2. "Burning"
3. "Requiem Of A Dream"
4. "Skankenstein" aka Megan Hill
5. "Time"
6. "On My Mind"
7. "Down The Road"
8. "The Delivery Man"
9. "Crazy Things"
10. "Flow"
11. "Soaking In A Hot Tub"
12. "Pop Your Bubbles"
13. "Skoolyard"
14. "Culture"

== Charts ==
Chart	Peak position
New Zealand Top 40 Albums	1

== Certifications ==
Certifications for Kora
Region	Certification	Certified units/sales
New Zealand (RMNZ)	3× Platinum	45,000^{‡}
^{‡} Sales+streaming figures based on certification alone.

== Awards ==
It was nominated for Best Roots Album at the 2008 Vodafone New Zealand Music Awards.

The music video for "Skankenstein" won a Sir Julius Vogel Award (New Zealand science fiction and fantasy award) for Best Dramatic Presentation (Short Form) in 2009.

== Remixes ==
A remix album Kora! Kora! Kora! / The Cabaret Voltaire Versions by UK band Cabaret Voltaire (reduced to sole remaining member Richard H. Kirk at the time) was released in March 2009, and featured six songs from the original album on seven tracks: Skankenstein, Pop Your Bubble, Flow, On My Mind, Burning, Crazy Things, and Burning Reprise.
