= Kora (band) =

New Zealand music group

- Origin: Whakatāne, New Zealand
- Genres: Reggae, dub, rock, funk, electronic
- Years active: 1991–2013, 2016–present
- Members: Francis Kora; Stuart Kora; Daniel McGruer; Richie Allan; Darren Mathiassen; Marika Hodgson; Karlos Tunks
- Past members: Laughton Kora; Brad Kora

Kora is a New Zealand music group originally formed by four brothers from the Kora family in Whakatāne. The band is known for its eclectic fusion of reggae, dub, rock, funk, and electronic elements, and is regarded as one of Aotearoa’s most dynamic live acts.

== History ==
=== Early years and breakthrough ===
Kora was formed in the early 1990s by brothers Laughton, Francis, Stuart, and Brad Kora. The group started by performing locally and built an early following with their live shows that blended rhythmic reggae grooves with rock and dub styles. Their first widely released recording was the Volume EP in 2004, which reached platinum status in New Zealand.

The band’s self‑titled debut album, Kora, was released in 2007 and reached number one on the New Zealand Albums Chart. The record was certified double platinum and produced several popular singles that received radio airplay, helping to establish Kora’s reputation both nationally and in international festival circuits.

Following the debut, Kora’s second studio album Light Years was issued in 2012, showcasing a broader musical range that included greater use of electronic textures and expanded genre influences.

=== Hiatus and reunion ===
After touring and releasing music through the early 2010s, Kora entered a period of inactivity from 2013, with members pursuing other creative projects. The group reformed in 2016 with a revised lineup centered around Francis and Stuart Kora alongside new band members, marking a renewed phase of live performances and recorded releases.

=== Return with new music and Fifth Season ===
In 2020 and 2021, Kora began releasing new singles independently, including “Secret Lover” and “Weekend”.

On 22 August 2025, Kora released their third studio album, Fifth Season, their first full album in over a decade. The record, supported by the singles “Easy Now (Final Season)”, “Revolution” (featuring original member Laughton Kora), and “U Wanna Give This Up”, blended dub, rock, funk, and reggae grooves. The album was accompanied by a nationwide tour in New Zealand in late 2025.

== Musical style ==
Kora’s sound has continuously evolved over their career but has remained rooted in bass‑heavy grooves and genre fusion. Originally grounded in reggae and dub, their music has incorporated rock, funk, and electronic production techniques, often featuring improvisational live performance elements and energetic stage presence. Their work has been described as genre‑defying and deeply rhythmic.

== Members ==
=== Current members ===
- Francis Kora – bass guitar, vocals
- Stuart Kora – guitar, vocals
- Daniel McGruer – keys, effects
- Richie Allan – guitar
- Darren Mathiassen – drums
- Marika Hodgson – bass guitar
- Karlos Tunks – rhythm guitar, backing vocals

=== Former members ===
- Laughton Kora – guitar, vocals
- Brad Kora – drums, vocals

== Discography ==
=== Studio albums ===
- Kora (2007)
- Light Years (2012)
- Fifth Season (2025)

=== EPs ===
- Volume (2004)

=== Selected singles ===
- “Secret Lover” (2020)
- “Weekend” (2020)
- “Easy Now (Final Season)” (2025)
- “Revolution” (2025)
- “U Wanna Give This Up” (2025)
