= New Zealand top 50 albums of 2021 =

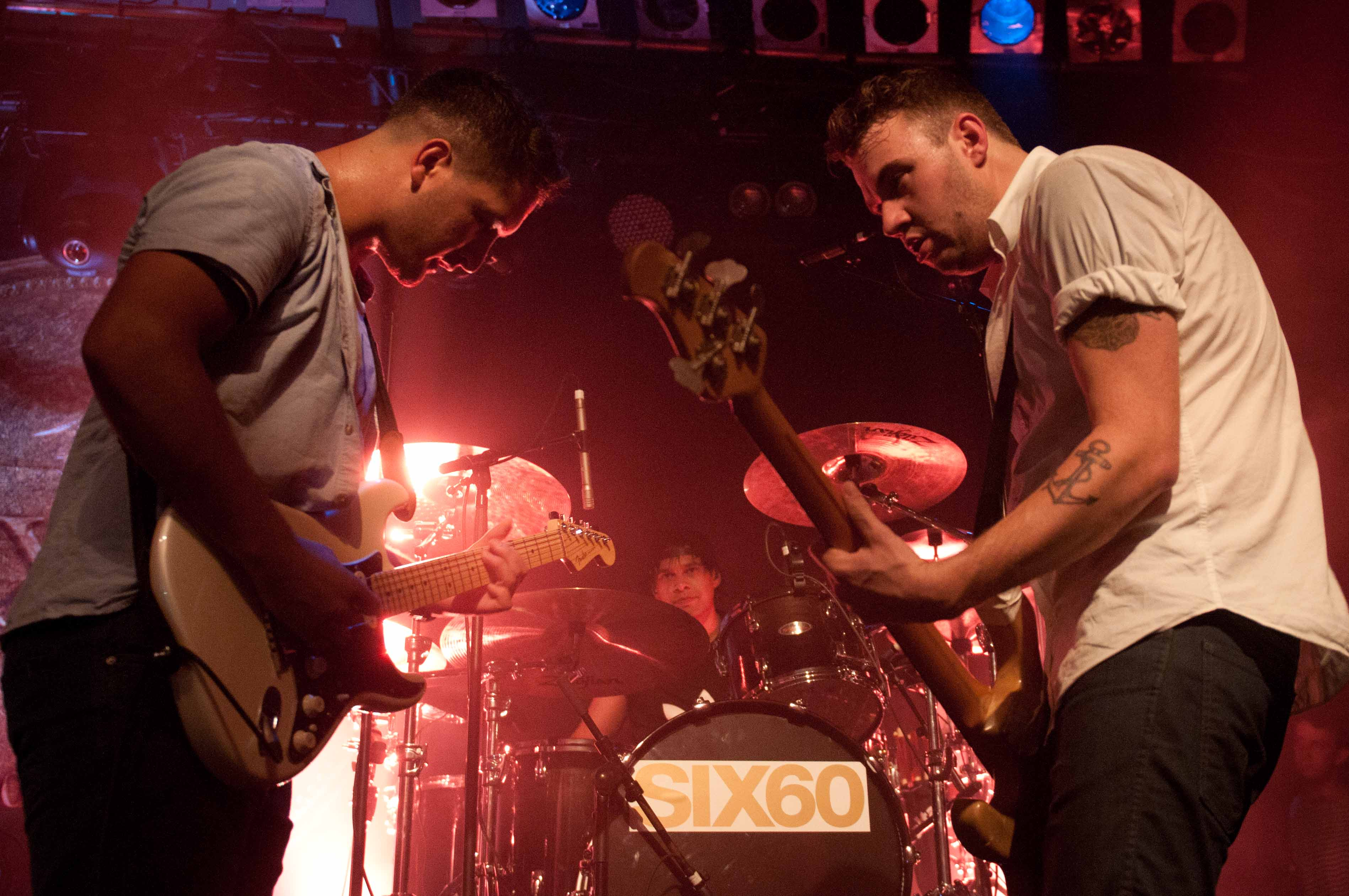
New Zealand band Six60 released the top performing album by a New Zealand artist, Six60 (2019)

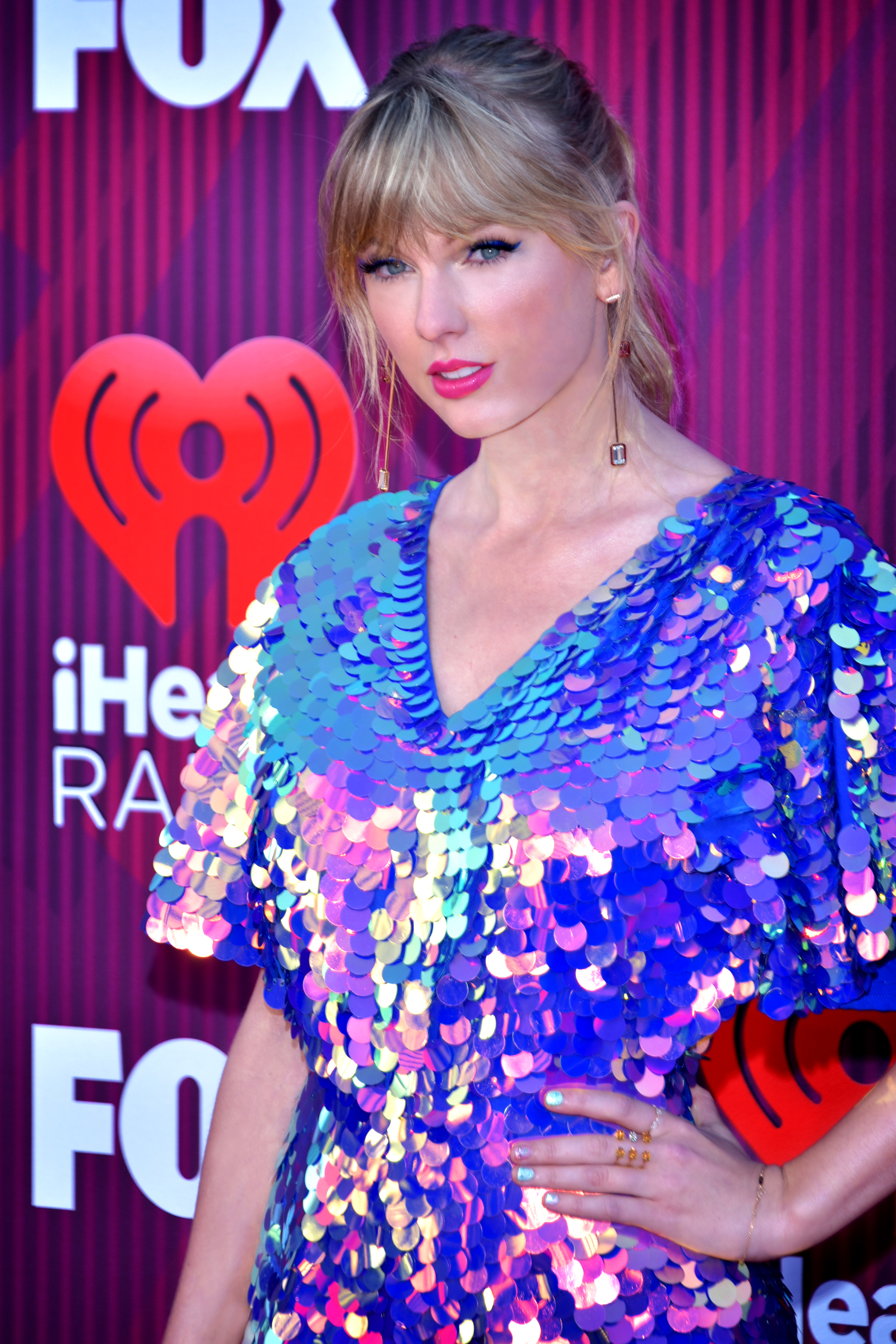
Five albums by American singer Taylor Swift were in the top 50 albums of 2021

This is a list of the top-selling albums in New Zealand for 2021 from the Official New Zealand Music Chart's end-of-year chart, compiled by Recorded Music NZ. Recorded Music NZ also published a list for the top 20 albums released by New Zealand artists.

== Chart ==
Key
† – Album of New Zealand origin (Note: Whether or not a song is of New Zealand origin is determined by the RIANZ.)

Rank	Artist	Title
1	Olivia Rodrigo	Sour
2	Adele	30
3	Six60	Six60 (3)
4	Pop Smoke	Shoot for the Stars, Aim for the Moon
5	Doja Cat	Planet Her
6	L.A.B.	L.A.B. IV
7	Dua Lipa	Future Nostalgia
8	Justin Bieber	Justice
9	Six60	Six60 (1)
10	The Weeknd	The Highlights
11	Harry Styles	Fine Line
12	Fleetwood Mac	Rumours
13	Six60	Six60 EP
14	The Kid Laroi	F*ck Love 3: Over You
15	Six60	Six60 (2)
16	Ed Sheeran	÷
17	L.A.B.	L.A.B. III
18	Ed Sheeran	=
19	Drake	Certified Lover Boy
20	Lewis Capaldi	Divinely Uninspired to a Hellish Extent
21	Billie Eilish	When We All Fall Asleep, Where Do We Go?
22	Ariana Grande	Positions
23	Stan Walker	Impossible (Music by the Book)
24	Taylor Swift	Evermore
25	L.A.B.	L.A.B.
26	Billie Eilish	Happier Than Ever
27	Taylor Swift	Folklore
28	Kanye West	Donda
29	J. Cole	The Off-Season
30	Drax Project	Drax Project
31	Bruno Mars	Doo-Wops & Hooligans
32	Juice Wrld	Legends Never Die
33	Teeks	Something to Feel
34	Lorde	Solar Power
35	Jack Harlow	Thats What They All Say
36	Ed Sheeran	No.6 Collaborations Project
37	Sam Smith	Love Goes
38	Miley Cyrus	Plastic Hearts
39	Taylor Swift	Red (Taylor's Version)
40	Taylor Swift	Fearless (Taylor's Version)
41	L.A.B.	L.A.B. II
42	Sol3 Mio	Coming Home
43	Queen	Bohemian Rhapsody: The Original Soundtrack
44	Lil Nas X	Montero
45	Dimension	Organ
46	Polo G	The Goat
47	Nirvana	Nevermind: 30th Anniversary Edition
48	Netsky	Second Nature
49	Mac Miller	Swimming
50	Taylor Swift	Reputation

== Top 20 Albums by New Zealand artists ==
Rank	Artist	Title
1	Six60	Six60 (3)
2	L.A.B.	L.A.B. IV
3	Six60	Six60 (1)
4	Six60	Six60 EP
5	Six60	Six60 (2)
6	L.A.B.	L.A.B. III
7	Stan Walker	Impossible (Music by the Book)
8	L.A.B.	L.A.B.
9	Drax Project	Drax Project
10	Teeks	Something to Feel
11	Lorde	Solar Power
12	L.A.B.	L.A.B. II
13	Sol3 Mio	Coming Home
14	Various Artists	Waiata / Anthems
15	Benee	Hey U X
16	L.A.B.	L.A.B. V
17	Crowded House	Dreamers Are Waiting
18	Stan Walker	Te Arohanui
19	Shihad	Old Gods
20	Hollie Smith	Coming in from the Dark
