= New Zealand top 50 albums of 2022 =

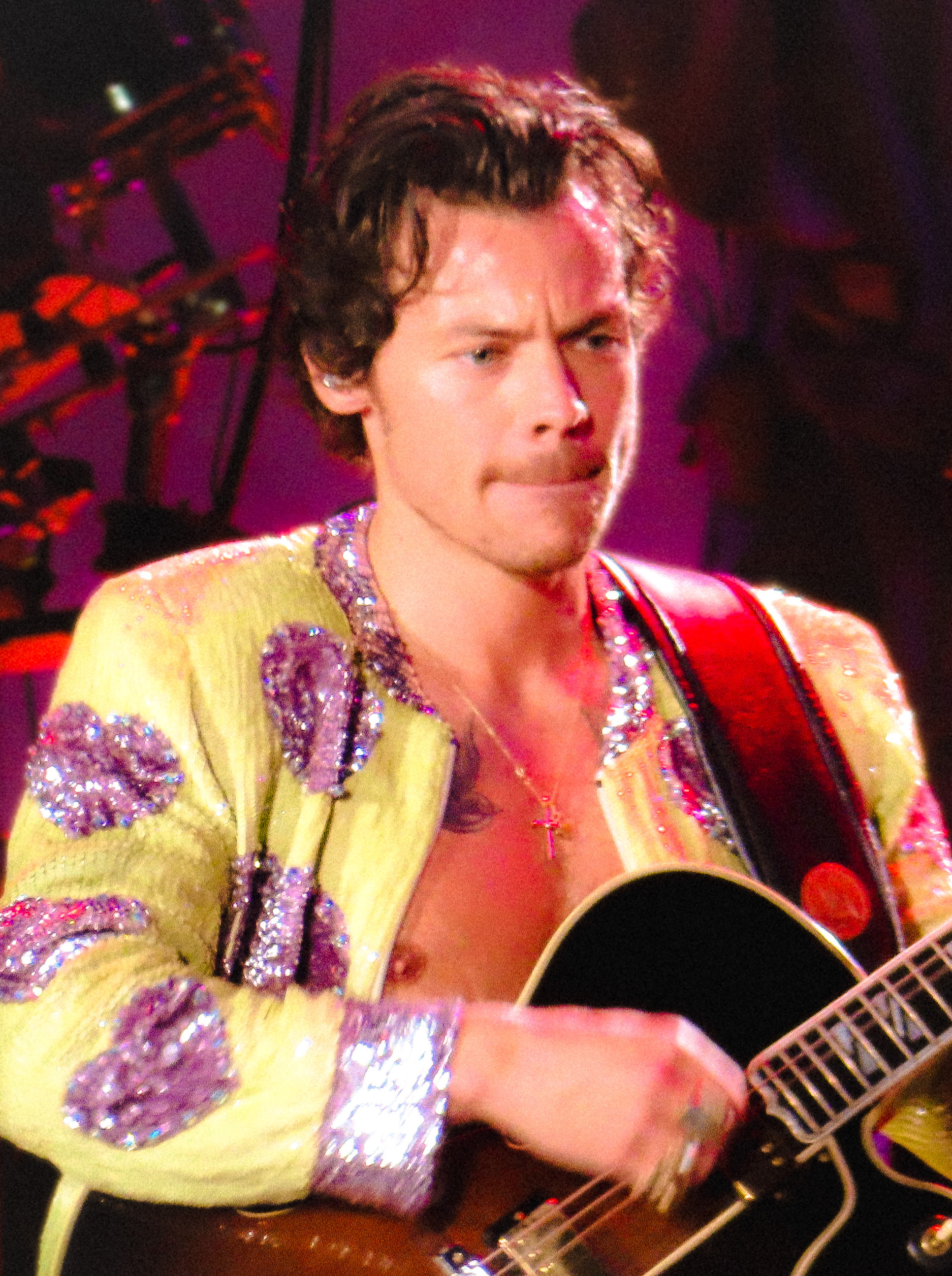
English singer Harry Styles released the top performing album of 2022

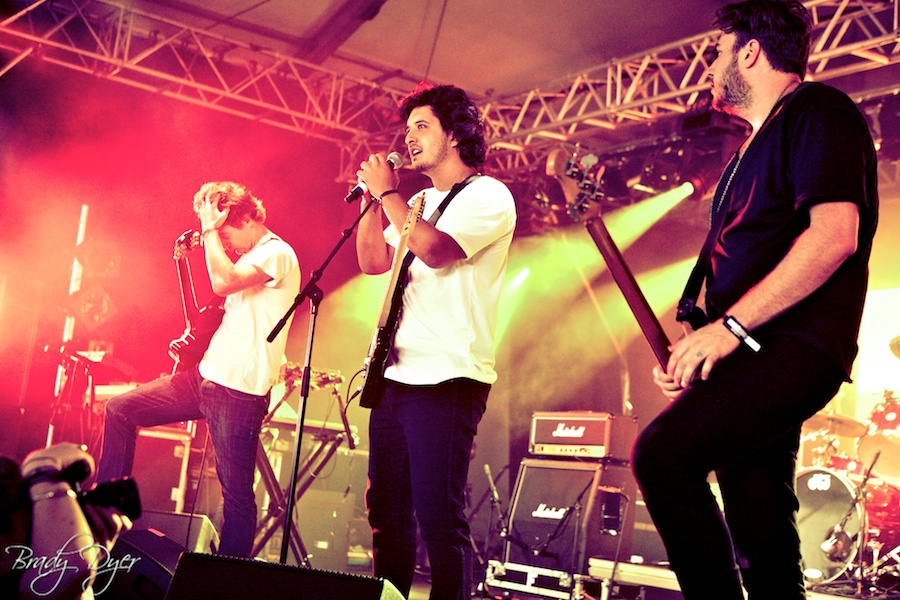
The top performing album of 2022 by a New Zealand artist was Six60's Six60 (1) (2011). Six60 also released five of the top 50 albums of 2022

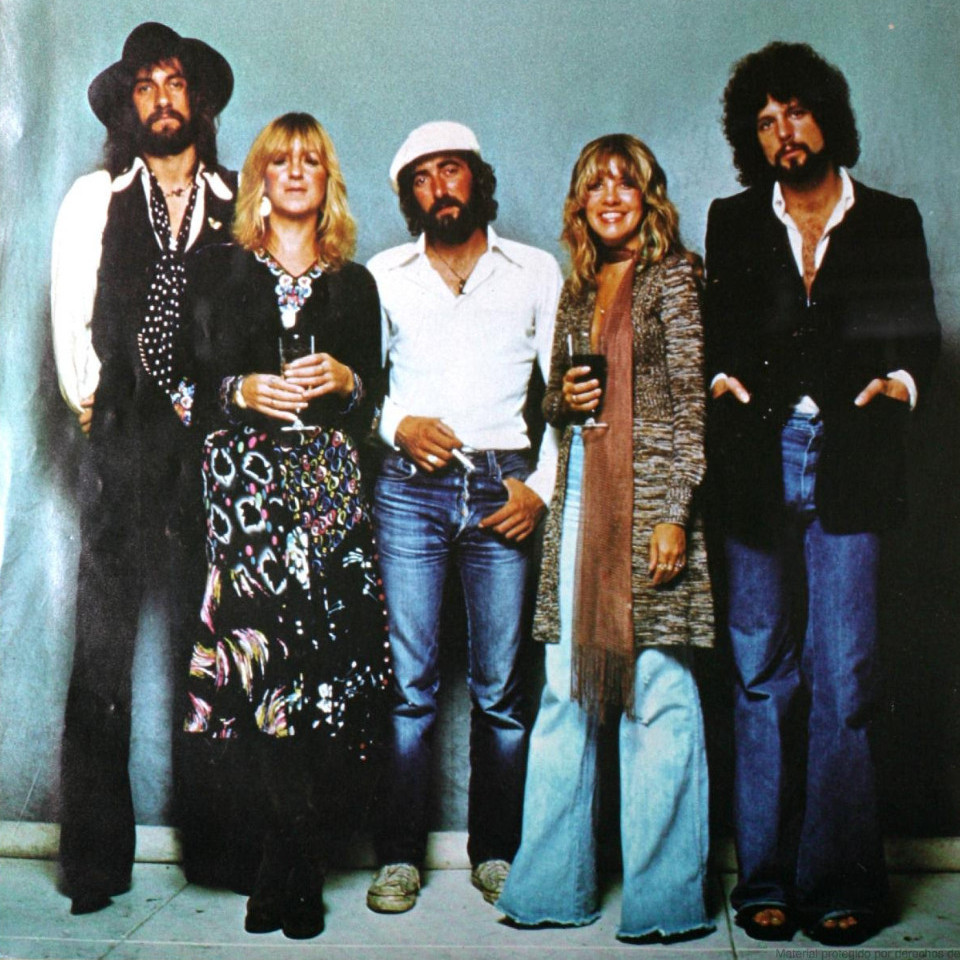
British-American rock band Fleetwood Mac's album Rumours (1977) charted in the top 50 for the fifth year

This is a list of the top-selling albums in New Zealand for 2022 from the Official New Zealand Music Chart's end-of-year chart, compiled by Recorded Music NZ. Recorded Music NZ also published a list for the top 20 albums released by New Zealand artists.

== Chart ==
Key
† – Album of New Zealand origin (Note: Whether or not a song is of New Zealand origin is determined by the RIANZ.)

Rank	Artist	Title
1	Harry Styles	Harry's House
2	Taylor Swift	Midnights
3	The Weeknd	The Highlights
4	Olivia Rodrigo	Sour
5	Doja Cat	Planet Her
6	Ed Sheeran	=
7	Six60	Six60 (1)
8	Six60	Six60 (3)
9	Pop Smoke	Shoot for the Stars, Aim for the Moon
10	Fleetwood Mac	Rumours
11	Dua Lipa	Future Nostalgia
12	Harry Styles	Fine Line
13	Adele	30
14	Ed Sheeran	÷
15	Justin Bieber	Justice
16	Billie Eilish	Happier Than Ever
17	Six60	Six60 EP
18	L.A.B.	L.A.B. V
19	Various	Encanto (Original Motion Picture Soundtrack)
20	Sam Smith	In the Lonely Hour
21	Billie Eilish	When We All Fall Asleep, Where Do We Go?
22	Drake	Certified Lover Boy
23	Kendrick Lamar	Mr. Morale & the Big Steppers
24	Kendrick Lamar	Good Kid, M.A.A.D City
25	The Weeknd	Dawn FM
26	Taylor Swift	Red (Taylor's Version)
27	Six60	Six60 (2)
28	Eminem	The Eminem Show: Expanded Edition
29	L.A.B.	L.A.B. IV
30	Taylor Swift	Folklore
31	Lewis Capaldi	Divinely Uninspired to a Hellish Extent
32	SZA	Ctrl
33	Foo Fighters	Greatest Hits
34	Little Mix	Between Us
35	Jack Harlow	Thats What They All Say
36	XXXTentacion	Look at Me: The Album
37	The Kid Laroi	F*ck Love 3: Over You
38	Billie Eilish	Don't Smile at Me
39	L.A.B.	L.A.B. III
40	BTS	Proof
41	Kanye West	Donda
42	Various	Stranger Things: Music from the Netflix Original Series, Season 4
43	Beyoncé	Renaissance
44	Lil Nas X	Montero
45	Drake and 21 Savage	Her Loss
46	Jack Harlow	Come Home the Kids Miss You
47	L.A.B.	L.A.B.
48	Post Malone	Twelve Carat Toothache
49	Drake	Honestly, Nevermind
50	Six60	Castle St

== Top 20 Albums by New Zealand artists ==
Rank	Artist	Title
1	Six60	Six60 (1)
2	Six60	Six60 (3)
3	Six60	Six60 EP
4	L.A.B.	L.A.B. V
5	Six60	Six60 (2)
6	L.A.B.	L.A.B. IV
7	L.A.B.	L.A.B. III
8	L.A.B.	L.A.B.
9	Six60	Castle St
10	Drax Project	Drax Project
11	Avantdale Bowling Club	Trees
12	Teeks	Something to Feel
13	L.A.B.	L.A.B. II
14	Marlon Williams	My Boy
15	Stan Walker	All In
16	Lorde	Solar Power
17	Stan Walker	Te Arohanui
18	The Beths	Expert in a Dying Field
19	Aldous Harding	Warm Chris
20	Tami Neilson	Kingmaker
