= New Zealand top 50 singles of 2023 =

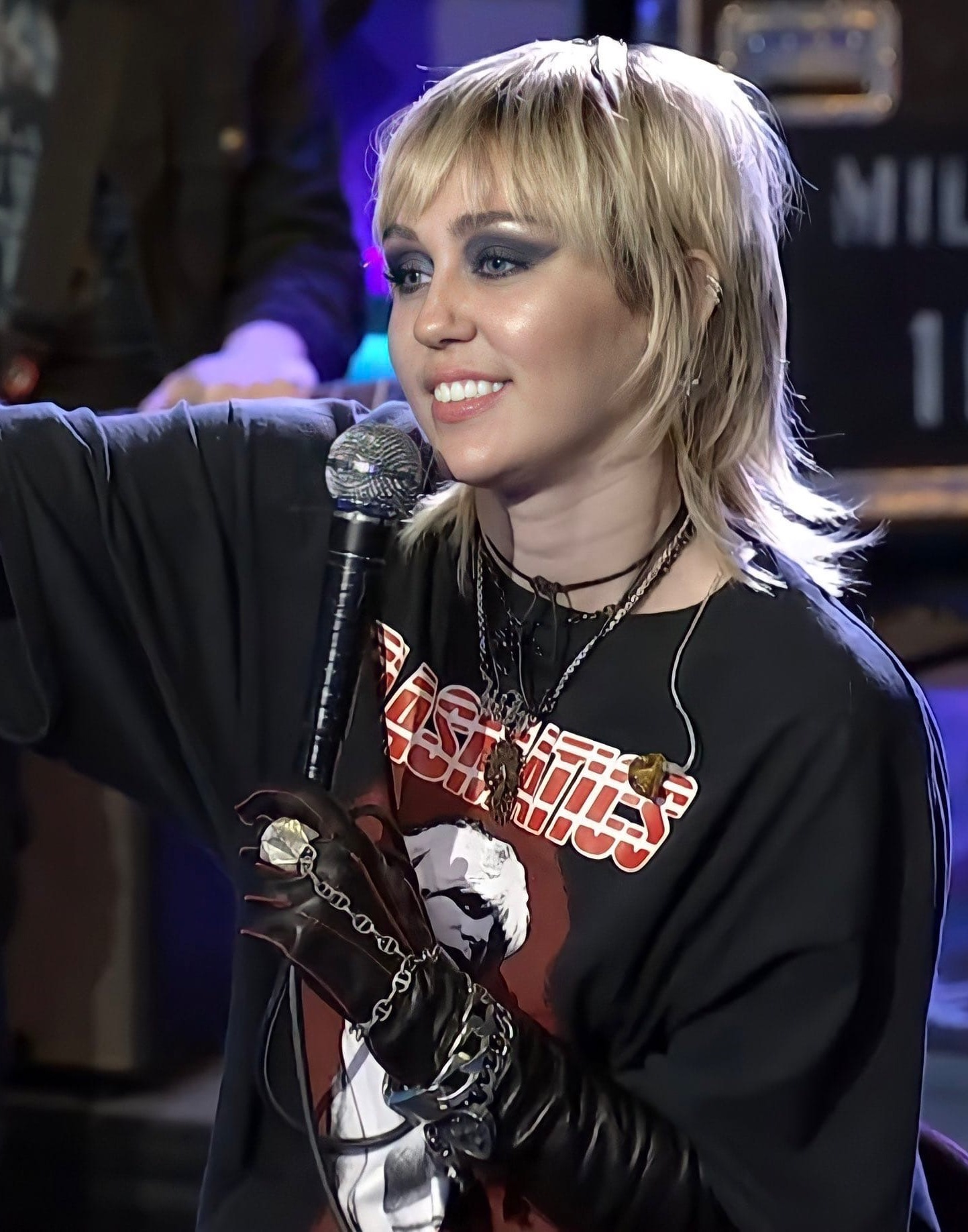
American singer Miley Cyrus released the top performing song of the year, "Flowers"

This is a list of the top-selling singles in New Zealand for 2023 from the Official New Zealand Music Chart's end-of-year chart, compiled by Recorded Music NZ. Recorded Music NZ also published 2023 lists for two sub-charts, the top 20 singles released by New Zealand artists, and the top 20 singles primarily performed in te reo Māori.

== Chart ==
Key
† – Song of New Zealand origin (Note: Whether or not a song is of New Zealand origin is determined by the Recorded Music NZ.)

Rank	Artist	Song
1	Miley Cyrus	"Flowers"
2	SZA	"Kill Bill"
3	Libianca	"People"
4	Miguel	"Sure Thing"
5	PinkPantheress	"Boy's a Liar"
6	Morgan Wallen	"Last Night"
7	The Weeknd and Ariana Grande	"Die For You (Remix)"
8	Zach Bryan	"Something in the Orange"
9	Rema	"Calm Down"
10	Fleetwood Mac	"Dreams"
11	Dave and Central Cee	"Sprinter"
12	Raye featuring 070 Shake	"Escapism"
13	Harry Styles	"As It Was"
14	SZA	"Snooze"
15	L.A.B.	"In the Air"
16	Doja Cat	"Paint the Town Red"
17	Taylor Swift	"Anti-Hero"
18	OneRepublic	"I Ain't Worried"
19	Taylor Swift	"Cruel Summer"
20	Elton John and Dua Lipa	"Cold Heart (Pnau remix)"
21	Sam Smith and Kim Petras	"Unholy"
22	J. Cole	"No Role Modelz"
23	L.A.B.	"Take It Away"
24	Metro Boomin, the Weeknd and 21 Savage	"Creepin'"
25	Coi Leray	"Players"
26	Stephen Sanchez and Em Beihold	"Until I Found You"
27	David Kushner	"Daylight"
28	Vance Joy	"Riptide"
29	David Guetta and Bebe Rexha	"I'm Good (Blue)"
30	Fifty Fifty	"Cupid"
31	Ed Sheeran	"Shivers"
32	Chris Brown	"Under the Influence"
33	Glass Animals	"Heat Waves"
34	Hotel Ugly	"Shut Up My Mom's Calling"
35	Venbee and Goddard.	"Messy in Heaven"
36	Kendrick Lamar featuring Jay Rock	"Money Trees"
37	Lewis Capaldi	"Someone You Loved"
38	Luke Combs	"Fast Car"
39	Meghan Trainor	"Made You Look"
40	Frank Ocean	"Pink + White"
41	Frank Ocean	"Lost"
42	The Weeknd and Ariana Grande	"Save Your Tears (Remix)"
43	Creedence Clearwater Revival	"Have You Ever Seen the Rain?"
44	The Killers	"Mr. Brightside"
45	Dua Lipa featuring DaBaby	"Levitating"
46	Beyoncé	"Cuff It"
47	Post Malone and Swae Lee	"Sunflower"
48	Jvke	"Golden Hour"
49	Fleetwood Mac	"Go Your Own Way"
50	JKing	"Cinderella"

== Top 20 singles by New Zealand artists ==
Rank	Artist	Song
1	L.A.B.	"In the Air"
2	L.A.B.	"Take It Away"
3	L.A.B.	"Mr Reggae"
4	L.A.B.	"Controller"
5	Six60	"Don't Forget Your Roots"
6	Six60	"Before You Leave"
7	Fat Freddy's Drop	"Wandering Eye"
8	Corrella	"Blue Eyed Māori"
9	L.A.B.	"Why Oh Why"
10	Six60	"Someone to Be Around"
11	Coterie	"Cool It Down"
12	Savage featuring Aaradhna	"They Don't Know"
13	The Black Seeds	"So True"
14	Drax Project featuring Six60	"Catching Feelings"
15	Crowded House	"Don't Dream It's Over"
16	Brutha Rodz featuring Wiz Tokelau	"Heart of a Lion"
17	Dave Dobbyn and Herbs	"Slice of Heaven"
18	Tiki Taane	"Always on My Mind"
19	Nesian Mystik	"Sun Goes Down"
20	1814	"Jah Rastafari"

== Top 20 singles sung in te reo Māori ==
Rank	Artist	Song
1	Te Matatini and Te Pikikōtuku o Ngāti Rongomai featuring Whenua Patuwai	"Te Ata Māhina"
2	Corrella	"Raumati"
3	Coterie	"Purea / Cool It Down"
4	Illumingāti	"Proud to Be Māori"
5	Tawaz	"He Aho"
6	Papa's Pack	"Muriwhenua Waiata"
7	Te Matatini and Ngā Tūmanako	"Waerea"
8	Tuari Brothers	"Whakatau Wairua"
9	Kora	"Kia Arohatia Tātou"
10	Origin Roots Aotearoa (O.R.A.)	"Ko Tāua"
11	Maimoa	"Manako"
12	Te Matatini and Hatea Kapa Haka featuring Maimoa	"Waiora"
13	Te Matatini and Te Kapa Haka o Te Whanau a Apanui	"Hai o Mo Apanui"
14	Te Matatini and Te Tu Mataora	"Hunara"
15	Kora	"Taraketi"
16	Rakai Whauwhau	"E Ihowa"
17	Rob Ruha and Drax Project	"Ka Taria"
18	Jordyn with a Why	"Raumati"
19	The Lion King Reo Māori Cast	"Kia Tu Au Hei Ariki"
20	Mohi	"Te Atarau"
