= List of number-one singles from the 2020s (New Zealand) =

The Official Aotearoa Music Charts ranks the best-performing singles in New Zealand. Its data, compiled by Recorded Music NZ, ranks the number-one singles in New Zealand during the 2020s decade, starting from 6 January 2020. The chart also includes data from on-demand audio streaming services.

Justin Bieber has achieved six number-one singles this decade, the most of any artist thus far.

From the 2020s: L.A.B.'s "In the Air" was the top song of 2020; the Glass Animals track "Heat Waves" was the top song of 2021 (although only peaking at number two); Elton John and Dua Lipa's "Cold Heart (Pnau remix)" was the top song of 2022; Miley Cyrus's "Flowers" was the top song of 2023; Teddy Swims's "Lose Control" was the top song of 2024 (although it only peaked at number three); and Alex Warren's "Ordinary" was the biggest song of 2025.

== Chart ==
Key

* – Number-one single of the year
† – Song of New Zealand origin (Note: Whether or not a song is of New Zealand origin is determined by the RMNZ)
‡ – Number-one single of the year, of New Zealand origin

List of number-one singles of the 2020s in New Zealand
Artist	Title	Weeks at number-one (Note: The date given is the day when the chart was published. The reporting period is from the preceding week, which is Monday to Sunday. Therefore, the date given is the day after the reporting period ended.)	Reached number-one	Reference
Tones and I	"Dance Monkey"	2	6 January 2020	
Justin Bieber	"Yummy"	2	20 January 2020	
Roddy Ricch	"The Box"	3	3 February 2020	
Justin Bieber featuring Quavo	"Intentions"	2	24 February 2020	
L.A.B.	"In the Air"‡	3	9 March 2020	
The Weeknd	"Blinding Lights"	3	30 March 2020	
Drake	"Toosie Slide"	1	20 April 2020	
The Weeknd	"Blinding Lights"	1	27 April 2020	
Saint Jhn	"Roses" (Imanbek remix)	2	4 May 2020	
Ariana Grande and Justin Bieber	"Stuck with U"	1	18 May 2020	
DaBaby featuring Roddy Ricch	"Rockstar"	5	25 May 2020	
Jawsh 685 and Jason Derulo	"Savage Love (Laxed – Siren Beat)" †	8	29 June 2020	
Cardi B featuring Megan Thee Stallion	"WAP"	6	24 August 2020	
24kGoldn featuring Iann Dior	"Mood"	4	5 October 2020	
Ariana Grande	"Positions"	2	2 November 2020	
24kGoldn featuring Iann Dior	"Mood"	1	16 November 2020	
Billie Eilish	"Therefore I Am"	1	23 November 2020	
24kGoldn featuring Iann Dior	"Mood"	2	30 November 2020	
L.A.B.	"Why Oh Why" †	5	14 December 2020	
Olivia Rodrigo	"Drivers License"	7	18 January 2021	
Six60	"All She Wrote" †	1	8 March 2021	
Silk Sonic	"Leave the Door Open"	2	15 March 2021	
Justin Bieber featuring Daniel Caesar and Giveon	"Peaches"	6	29 March 2021	
Doja Cat featuring SZA	"Kiss Me More"	1	10 May 2021	
Russ Millions and Tion Wayne	"Body" (Remix)	1	17 May 2021	
Olivia Rodrigo	"Good 4 U"	6	24 May 2021	
Ed Sheeran	"Bad Habits"	2	5 July 2021	
The Kid Laroi and Justin Bieber	"Stay"	10	19 July 2021	
Lil Nas X featuring Jack Harlow	"Industry Baby"	1	27 September 2021	
The Kid Laroi and Justin Bieber	"Stay"	1	4 October 2021	
Elton John and Dua Lipa	"Cold Heart (Pnau remix)"	2	11 October 2021	
Adele	"Easy on Me"	3	25 October 2021	
Elton John and Dua Lipa	"Cold Heart (Pnau remix)"	1	15 November 2021	
Taylor Swift	"All Too Well (Taylor's Version)"	1	22 November 2021	
Adele	"Easy on Me"	3	29 November 2021	
Elton John and Dua Lipa	"Cold Heart (Pnau remix)"	2	20 December 2021	
Mariah Carey	"All I Want for Christmas Is You"	1	3 January 2022	
Elton John and Dua Lipa	"Cold Heart (Pnau remix)"	1	10 January 2022	
Luude featuring Colin Hay	"Down Under"	9	17 January 2022	
Elton John and Dua Lipa	"Cold Heart (Pnau remix)"	3	21 March 2022	
Harry Styles	"As It Was"	1	11 April 2022	
Jack Harlow	"First Class"	6	18 April 2022	
Harry Styles	"As It Was"	2	30 May 2022	
Kate Bush	"Running Up That Hill (A Deal with God)"	2	13 June 2022	
Joji	"Glimpse of Us"	5	27 June 2022	
Central Cee	"Doja"	2	1 August 2022	
OneRepublic	"I Ain't Worried"	2	15 August 2022	
Nicki Minaj	"Super Freaky Girl"	5	29 August 2022	
Sam Smith and Kim Petras	"Unholy"	4	3 October 2022	
Taylor Swift	"Anti-Hero"	2	31 October 2022	
Sam Smith and Kim Petras	"Unholy"	5	14 November 2022	
SZA	"Kill Bill"	2	19 December 2022	
Brenda Lee	"Rockin' Around the Christmas Tree"	1	2 January 2023	
SZA	"Kill Bill"	2	9 January 2023	
Miley Cyrus	"Flowers"	5	23 January 2023	
PinkPantheress and Ice Spice	"Boy's a Liar Pt. 2"	6	27 February 2023	
Miley Cyrus	"Flowers"	2	10 April 2023	
SZA	"Kill Bill"	1	24 April 2023	
David Kushner	"Daylight"	1	1 May 2023	
Fifty Fifty	"Cupid"	5	8 May 2023	
Dave and Central Cee	"Sprinter"	4	12 June 2023	
Olivia Rodrigo	"Vampire"	1	10 July 2023	
Dave and Central Cee	"Sprinter"	5	17 July 2023	
Doja Cat	"Paint the Town Red"	10	21 August 2023	
Tyla	"Water"	1	30 October 2023	
Taylor Swift	"Is It Over Now?"	1	6 November 2023	
Tyla	"Water"	1	13 November 2023	
Jack Harlow	"Lovin on Me"	6	20 November 2023	
Mariah Carey	"All I Want for Christmas Is You"	1	1 January 2024	
Jack Harlow	"Lovin on Me"	4	8 January 2024	
YG Marley	"Praise Jah in the Moonlight"	3	5 February 2024	
Beyoncé	"Texas Hold 'Em"	3	26 February 2024	
Ariana Grande	"We Can't Be Friends (Wait for Your Love)"	2	18 March 2024	
Benson Boone	"Beautiful Things"	2	1 April 2024	
Hozier	"Too Sweet"	2	15 April 2024	
Taylor Swift featuring Post Malone	"Fortnight"	1	29 April 2024	
Hozier	"Too Sweet"	1	6 May 2024	
Tommy Richman	"Million Dollar Baby"	5	13 May 2024	
Eminem	"Houdini"	1	17 June 2024	
Sabrina Carpenter	"Please Please Please"	3	24 June 2024	
Kendrick Lamar	"Not Like Us"	2	15 July 2024	
Billie Eilish	"Birds of a Feather"	2	29 July 2024	
Charli XCX featuring Billie Eilish	"Guess"	1	12 August 2024	
Billie Eilish	"Birds of a Feather"	1	19 August 2024	
Lady Gaga and Bruno Mars	"Die with a Smile"	9	26 August 2024	
Rosé and Bruno Mars	"APT."	4	28 October 2024	
Gracie Abrams	"That's So True"	1	22 November 2024	
Kendrick Lamar	"Luther"	1	29 November 2024	
Rosé and Bruno Mars	"APT."	3	6 December 2024	
Wham!	"Last Christmas"	1	27 December 2024	
Rosé and Bruno Mars	"APT."	4	3 January 2025	
Chrystal	"The Days" (Notion Remix)	2	31 January 2025	
Kendrick Lamar	"Luther"	5	14 February 2025	
Doechii	"Anxiety"	1	21 March 2025	
Alex Warren	"Ordinary"	5	28 March 2025	
Lorde	"What Was That" †	1	2 May 2025	
Alex Warren	"Ordinary"	10	9 May 2025	
Huntrix	"Golden"	1	18 July 2025	
Justin Bieber	"Daisies"	1	25 July 2025	
Huntrix	"Golden"	7	1 August 2025	
Olivia Dean	"Man I Need"	3	19 September 2025	
Taylor Swift	"The Fate of Ophelia"	2	10 October 2025	
Olivia Dean	"Man I Need"	9	24 October 2025	
Wham!	"Last Christmas"	1	26 December 2025	
Olivia Dean	"Man I Need"	19	3 January 2026	
Ella Langley	"Choosin' Texas"	5	15 May 2026	
Olivia Rodrigo	"Stupid Song"	1	19 June 2026	
Ella Langley	"Choosin' Texas"	14	26 June 2026	
Taylor Swift	"Patient Zero"	1	2 October 2026	
Ella Langley	"Choosin' Texas"	1	9 October 2026	
Olivia Dean	"Man I Need"	2	16 October 2026	
Tate McRae	"Housewife"	2	30 October 2026	
Sam Fender and Olivia Dean	"Rein Me In"	1	13 November 2026	
Jamie Miller	"Babydoll"	1	20 November 2026	

== New Zealand singles chart ==
List of number-one singles of the 2020s in New Zealand by New Zealand artists
Artist	Title	Weeks at number-one	Reached number-one	Reference
Benee	"Glitter"	5	6 January 2020	
L.A.B.	"In the Air"	7	10 February 2020	
Benee featuring Gus Dapperton	"Supalonely"	1	30 March 2020	
L.A.B.	"In the Air"	6	10 February 2020	
Benee featuring Gus Dapperton	"Supalonely"	1	18 May 2020	
L.A.B.	"In the Air"	4	25 May 2020	
Jawsh 685 and Jason Derulo	"Savage Love (Laxed – Siren Beat)"	22	22 June 2020	
L.A.B.	"In the Air"	3	23 November 2020	
L.A.B.	"Why Oh Why"	12	14 December 2020	
Six60	"All She Wrote"	15	8 March 2021	
Lorde	"Solar Power"	2	21 June 2021	
Six60	"All She Wrote"	1	5 July 2021	
L.A.B.	"In the Air"	1	12 July 2021	
Six60	"All She Wrote"	1	19 July 2021	
Sons of Zion featuring Jackson Owens	"Love on the Run"	5	26 July 2021	
Lorde	"Mood Ring"	1	30 August 2021	
Six60	"Pepeha"	10	6 September 2021	
Ka Hao featuring Rob Ruha	"35"	3	15 November 2021	
L.A.B.	"Mr Reggae"	14	6 December 2021	
L.A.B.	"In the Air"	24	14 March 2022	
Six60	"Before You Leave"	9	29 August 2022	
L.A.B.	"In the Air"	1	31 October 2022	
Six60	"Before You Leave"	3	7 November 2022	
Victor J Sefo, Lisi and Mwayz	"685 (Remix)"	1	28 November 2022	
L.A.B.	"In the Air"	9	5 December 2022	
L.A.B.	"Take It Away"	29	6 February 2023	
Corrella	"Blue Eyed Māori"	57	23 August 2023	
Hori Shaw	"Back in My Arms"	2	30 September 2024	
Rokkō	"Ava"	1	14 October 2024	
Hori Shaw	"Back in My Arms"	4	28 October 2024	
Stan Walker	"Māori ki te Ao"	1	22 November 2024	
Hori Shaw	"Back in My Arms"	2	29 November 2024	
Shane Walker	"Coasty Girl"	12	13 December 2024	
Te Wehi	"Unaware"	2	7 March 2025	
Te Matatini and Te Kuru Marutea	"Kei Wareware i a Tātou"	2	21 March 2025	
Te Wehi	"Unaware"	4	4 April 2025	
Lorde	"What Was That"	4	2 May 2025	
Te Wehi	"Unaware"	1	30 May 2025	
Lorde	"Man of the Year"	1	6 June 2025	
Hori Shaw	"Back in My Arms"	2	13 June 2025	
Lorde	"Hammer"	1	27 June 2025	
Lorde	"Shapeshifter"	1	4 July 2025	
Hori Shaw	"Back in My Arms"	2	11 July 2025	
Te Wehi	"Unaware"	2	25 July 2025	
Hori Shaw and Te Wehi	"Ready to Ride"	5	8 August 2025	
Hori Shaw	"Back in My Arms"	1	12 September 2025	
Hori Shaw and Te Wehi	"Ready to Ride"	1	19 September 2025	
Hori Shaw	"Back in My Arms"	1	26 September 2025	
Hori Shaw and Te Wehi	"Ready to Ride"	11	3 October 2025	
Six60	"We Made It"	1	19 December 2025	
Hori Shaw and Te Wehi	"Ready to Ride"	7	26 December 2025	
Te Wehi and Hori Shaw	"Catch a Wave"	1	13 February 2026	
Six60	"We Made It"	1	20 February 2026	
Te Wehi and Hori Shaw	"Catch a Wave"	7	27 February 2026	
Te Wehi and Hori Shaw	"Catch a Wave"	1	10 April 2026	
Son & Water	"Hotel California"	1	17 April 2026	
Hori Shaw and Te Wehi	"Ready to Ride"	13	24 April 2026	
Fat Papi and Prodslushy	"Freaked Out"	3	24 July 2026	
Hori Shaw and Te Wehi	"Ready to Ride"	6	14 August 2026	
Frankie Venter	"Say It"	1	25 September 2026	
Hori Shaw and Te Wehi	"Ready to Ride"	1	2 October 2026	
Son & Water	"Saw"	2	9 October 2026	
Hori Shaw and Te Wehi	"Ready to Ride"	1	23 October 2026	
Son & Water	"Saw"	1	30 October 2026	
Hori Shaw and Te Wehi	"Ready to Ride"	3	6 November 2026	
