= New Zealand top 50 albums of 2020 =

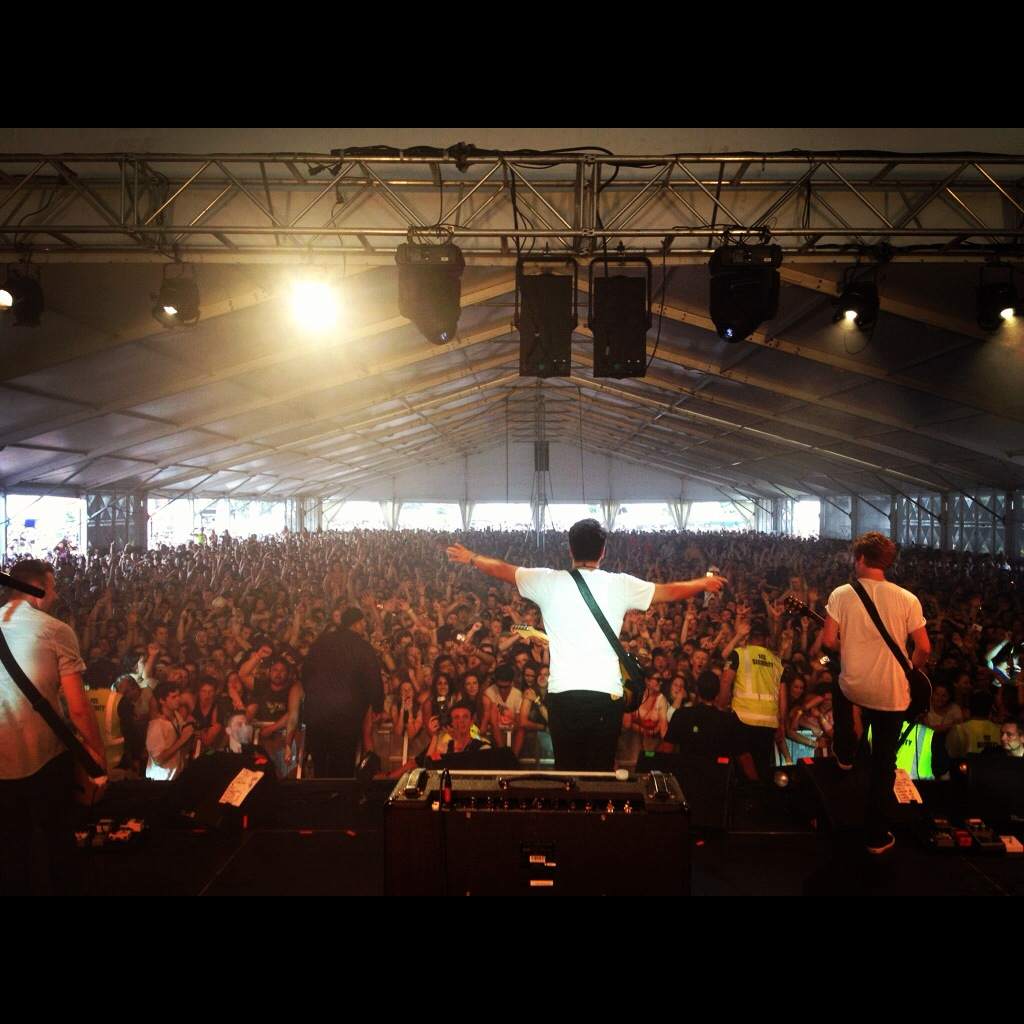
New Zealand band Six60 released the top performing album of the year, Six60 (2019), as well as four of the top 50 albums of the year

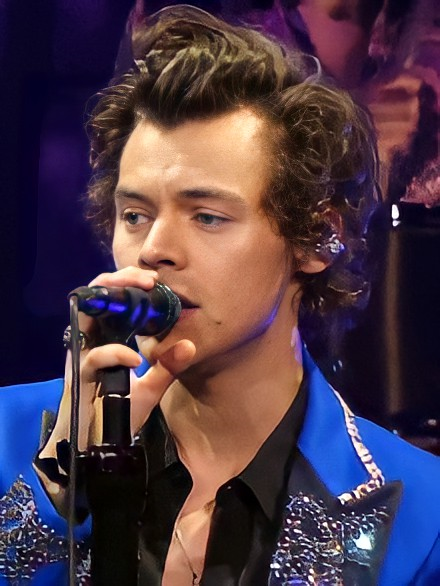
English singer Harry Styles' album Fine Line (2019) was the second best performing release of the year

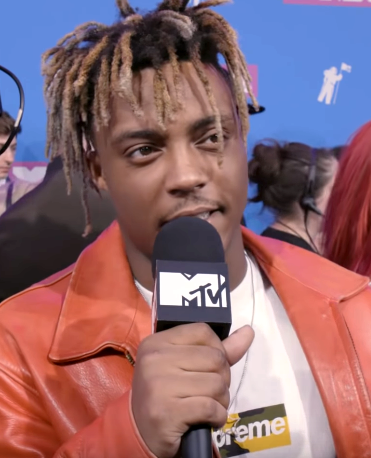
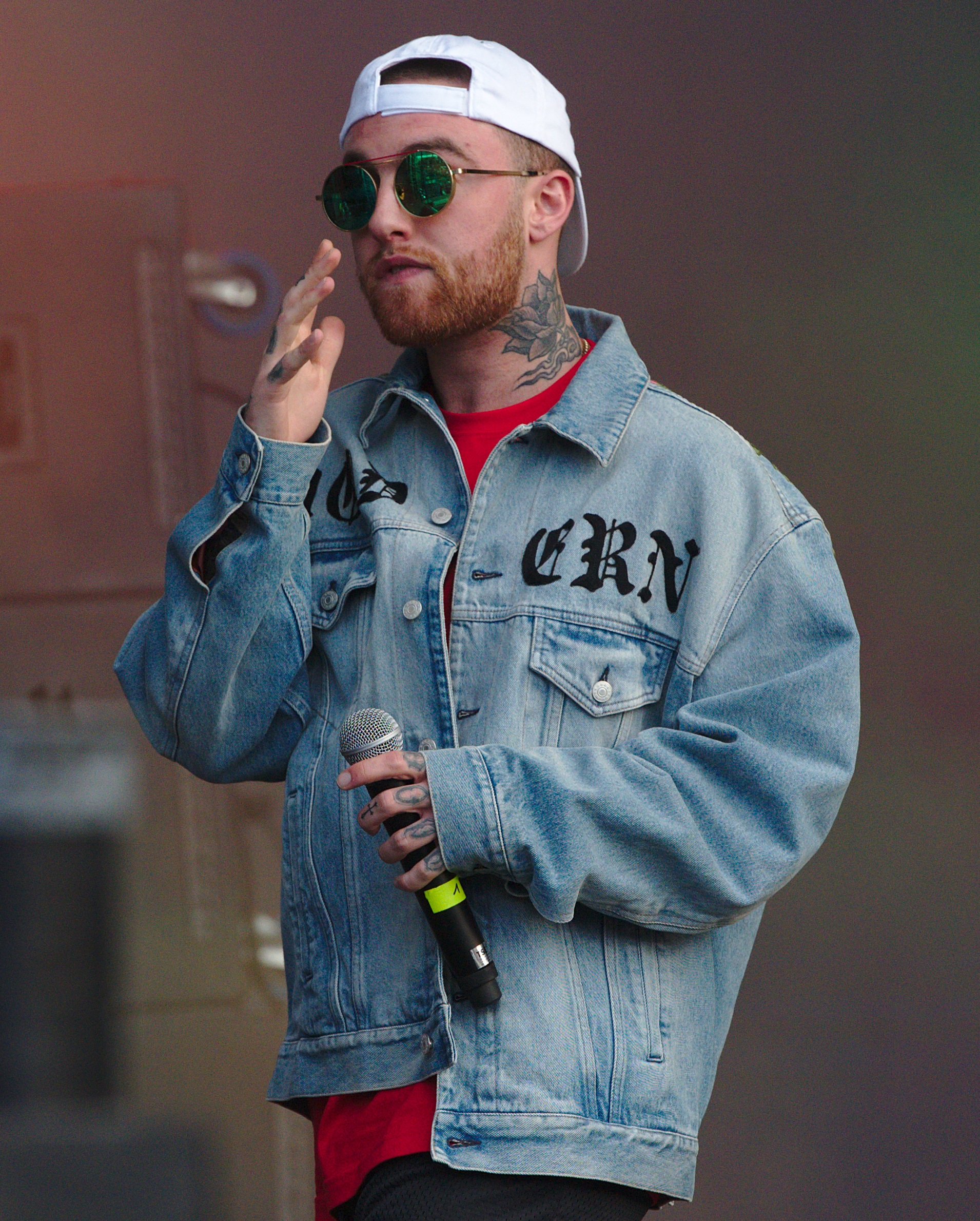
Albums by rappers Juice Wrld (top), Mac Miller (bottom) and Pop Smoke posthumously performed well in 2020

This is a list of the top-selling albums in New Zealand for 2020 from the Official New Zealand Music Chart's end-of-year chart, compiled by Recorded Music NZ. Recorded Music NZ also published a list for the top 20 albums released by New Zealand artists.

== Chart ==
Key
† – Album of New Zealand origin (Note: Whether or not an album is of New Zealand origin is determined by the RIANZ.)

Rank	Artist	Title
1	Six60	Six60 (3)
2	Harry Styles	Fine Line
3	Pop Smoke	Shoot for the Stars, Aim for the Moon
4	Lewis Capaldi	Divinely Uninspired to a Hellish Extent
5	Billie Eilish	When We All Fall Asleep, Where Do We Go?
6	Six60	Six60 EP
7	L.A.B.	L.A.B. III
8	Taylor Swift	Folklore
9	Six60	Six60 (1)
10	Six60	Six60 (2)
11	Ed Sheeran	No.6 Collaborations Project
12	Post Malone	Hollywood's Bleeding
13	Bob Marley and the Wailers	Legend: The Best Of
14	Elton John	Diamonds
15	Ed Sheeran	÷
16	Dua Lipa	Future Nostalgia
17	Drax Project	Drax Project
18	Fleetwood Mac	Rumours
19	Queen	Bohemian Rhapsody: The Original Soundtrack
20	Eminem	Music to Be Murdered By
21	Taylor Swift	Lover
22	BTS	Map of the Soul: 7
23	Juice Wrld	Legends Never Die
24	Post Malone	Beerbongs & Bentleys
25	The Weeknd	After Hours
26	L.A.B.	L.A.B.
27	Juice Wrld	Goodbye & Good Riddance
28	Billie Eilish	Don't Smile at Me
29	Khalid	Free Spirit
30	Justin Bieber	Changes
31	Benee	Fire on Marzz
32	Doja Cat	Hot Pink
33	Lil Uzi Vert	Eternal Atake
34	Various Artists	Frozen II (Original Motion Picture Soundtrack)
35	The Kid Laroi	F*ck Love (Savage)
36	Mac Miller	Circles
37	Ariana Grande	Thank U, Next
38	Lauv	How I'm Feeling
39	L.A.B.	L.A.B. II
40	Chris Brown	Indigo
41	Roddy Ricch	Please Excuse Me for Being Antisocial
42	Juice Wrld	Death Race for Love
43	Ariana Grande	Positions
44	Lady Gaga	Chromatica
45	Various Artists	Waiata / Anthems
46	Ella Mai	Ella Mai
47	Camila Cabello	Romance
48	Hamilton Broadway cast	Hamilton (Original Broadway Cast Recording)
49	Pop Smoke	Meet the Woo 2
50	AC/DC	Power Up

== Top 20 Albums by New Zealand artists ==
Rank	Artist	Title
1	Six60	Six60 (3)
2	Six60	Six60 EP
3	L.A.B.	L.A.B. III
4	Six60	Six60 (1)
5	Six60	Six60 (2)
6	Drax Project	Drax Project
7	L.A.B.	L.A.B.
8	Benee	Fire on Marzz
9	L.A.B.	L.A.B. II
10	Various Artists	Waiata / Anthems
11	Mitch James	Mitch James
12	Lorde	Melodrama
13	Devilskin	Red
14	L.A.B.	L.A.B. IV
15	Split Enz	True Colours: 40th Anniversary Edition
16	Stan Walker	Impossible (Music by the Book)
17	Sons of Zion	Vantage Point
18	Benee	Hey U X
19	Fat Freddy's Drop	Special Edition Part 1
20	Nadia Reid	Out of My Province
