= List of number-one albums from the 2020s (New Zealand) =

This is the Recorded Music NZ list of number-one albums in New Zealand during the 2020s. In New Zealand, Recorded Music NZ compiles the top 40 albums chart each Friday, and dates the chart for the following Monday. Over-the-counter sales of both physical and digital formats make up the data. Certifications are awarded for the number of shipments to retailers. Gold certifications are awarded after 7,500 sales, and platinum certifications after 15,000.

The following albums were all number one in New Zealand in the 2020s.

== Number ones ==
Key

* – Number-one album of the year (Note: Annual charts are sourced from the RMNZ website.)
† – Album of New Zealand origin (Note: Whether or not a song is of New Zealand origin is determined by RMNZ)
‡ – Number-one album of the year, of New Zealand origin

List of number-one albums of the 2020s in New Zealand
Artist	Album	Weeks at number one	Reached number one	Certification	Ref.
Six60	Six60‡	3	6 January 2020	6× Platinum	
Eminem	Music to Be Murdered By	1	27 January 2020	Gold	
Six60	Six60‡	4	3 February 2020	6× Platinum	
BTS	Map of the Soul: 7	1	2 March 2020	Gold	
Six60	Six60‡	3	9 March 2020	6× Platinum	
The Weeknd	After Hours	1	30 March 2020	Gold	
Dua Lipa	Future Nostalgia	1	6 April 2020	4× Platinum	
Six60	Six60‡	4	13 April 2020	6× Platinum	
Drake	Dark Lane Demo Tapes	1	11 May 2020	-	
Six60	Six60‡	1	18 May 2020	6× Platinum	
Blindspott	Blindspott†	1	25 May 2020	3× Platinum	
Six60	Six60‡	1	1 June 2020	6× Platinum	
Lady Gaga	Chromatica	1	8 June 2020	-	
Six60	Six60‡	2	15 June 2020	6× Platinum	
Bob Dylan	Rough and Rowdy Ways	1	29 June 2020	-	
Six60	Six60‡	1	6 July 2020	6× Platinum	
Pop Smoke	Shoot for the Stars, Aim for the Moon	1	13 July 2020	4× Platinum	
Juice Wrld	Legends Never Die	2	20 July 2020	Gold	
Taylor Swift	Folklore	1	3 August 2020	5× Platinum	
Split Enz	True Colours: 40th Anniversary Mix†	1	10 August 2020	Platinum	
Taylor Swift	Folklore	1	17 August 2020	5× Platinum	
Pop Smoke	Shoot for the Stars, Aim for the Moon	7	24 August 2020	4× Platinum	
Blackpink	The Album	1	12 October 2020	-	
Pop Smoke	Shoot for the Stars, Aim for the Moon	2	19 October 2020	4× Platinum	
Bruce Springsteen	Letter to You	1	2 November 2020	-	
Ariana Grande	Positions	2	9 November 2020	Platinum	
AC/DC	Power Up	1	23 November 2020	-	
BTS	Be	1	30 November 2020	-	
Six60	Six60‡	1	7 December 2020	6× Platinum	
Michael Bublé	Christmas	1	14 December 2020	12× Platinum	
Taylor Swift	Evermore	1	21 December 2020	2× Platinum	
L.A.B.	L.A.B. IV†	5	28 December 2020	Platinum	
Six60	Six60†	2	1 February 2021	6× Platinum	
Foo Fighters	Medicine at Midnight	1	15 February 2021	-	
Six60	Six60†	5	22 February 2021	6× Platinum	
Justin Bieber	Justice	1	29 March 2021	2× Platinum	
Teeks	Something to Feel†	1	5 April 2021	-	
Justin Bieber	Justice	1	12 April 2021	2× Platinum	
Taylor Swift	Fearless (Taylor's Version)	1	19 April 2021	Platinum	
Justin Bieber	Justice	1	26 April 2021	2× Platinum	
Six60	Six60†	3	3 May 2021	6× Platinum	
J. Cole	The Off-Season	1	24 May 2021	Gold	
Olivia Rodrigo	Sour	10	6 June 2021	5× Platinum	
Billie Eilish	Happier Than Ever	1	9 August 2021	3× Platinum	
Olivia Rodrigo	Sour	1	16 August 2021	5× Platinum	
Doja Cat	Planet Her	1	23 August 2021	3× Platinum	
Lorde	Solar Power†	1	30 August 2021	Gold	
Kanye West	Donda	1	6 September 2021	Gold	
Drake	Certified Lover Boy	2	13 September 2021	Gold	
Lil Nas X	Montero	1	27 September 2021	Gold	
Drake	Certified Lover Boy	1	4 October 2021	Gold	
Doja Cat	Planet Her	1	11 October 2021	3× Platinum	
Shihad	Old Gods†	1	18 October 2021	-	
Doja Cat	Planet Her	1	25 October 2021	3× Platinum	
Hollie Smith	Coming in from the Dark†	1	1 November 2021	-	
Ed Sheeran	=	1	8 November 2021	2× Platinum	
ABBA	Voyage	1	15 November 2021	-	
Taylor Swift	Red (Taylor's Version)	1	22 November 2021	2× Platinum	
Adele	30	7	29 November 2021	3× Platinum	
The Weeknd	Dawn FM	1	17 January 2022	-	
L.A.B.	L.A.B. V†	2	24 January 2022	Platinum	
Various artists	Encanto (Original Motion Picture Soundtrack)	4	7 February 2022	Platinum	
Don McGlashan	Bright November Morning†	1	7 March 2022	-	
Olivia Rodrigo	Sour	1	14 March 2022	5× Platinum	
Rex Orange County	Who Cares?	1	21 March 2022	-	
Doja Cat	Planet Her	1	28 March 2022	3× Platinum	
Aldous Harding	Warm Chris†	1	4 April 2022	-	
Red Hot Chili Peppers	Unlimited Love	1	11 April 2022	-	
Olivia Rodrigo	Sour	3	18 April 2022	5× Platinum	
Future	I Never Liked You	1	9 May 2022	-	
Jack Harlow	Come Home the Kids Miss You	1	16 May 2022	-	
Kendrick Lamar	Mr. Morale & the Big Steppers	1	23 May 2022	-	
Harry Styles	Harry's House	3	30 May 2022	3× Platinum	
BTS	Proof	1	20 June 2022	-	
Drake	Honestly, Nevermind	1	27 June 2022	-	
Harry Styles	Harry's House	3	4 July 2022	3× Platinum	
Tami Neilson	Kingmaker†	1	25 July 2022	-	
Harry Styles	Harry's House	1	1 August 2022	3× Platinum	
Beyoncé	Renaissance	2	8 August 2022	Platinum	
The Weeknd	The Highlights	2	22 August 2022	3× Platinum	
Muse	Will of the People	1	5 September 2022	-	
Yungblud	Yungblud	1	12 September 2022	-	
Marlon Williams	My Boy†	1	19 September 2022	-	
The Beths	Expert in a Dying Field†	1	26 September 2022	-	
The Weeknd	The Highlights	1	3 October 2022	3× Platinum	
Avantdale Bowling Club	Trees†	1	10 October 2022	-	
Six60	Castle St†	1	17 October 2022	Gold	
Red Hot Chili Peppers	Return of the Dream Canteen	1	24 October 2022	-	
Taylor Swift	Midnights	6	31 October 2022	4× Platinum	
Metro Boomin	Heroes & Villains	1	12 December 2022	-	
SZA	SOS	2	19 December 2022	4× Platinum	
Michael Bublé	Christmas	1	2 January 2023	13× Platinum	
SZA	SOS	7	9 January 2023	4× Platinum	
Pink	Trustfall	1	27 February 2023	Gold	
Gorillaz	Cracker Island	1	6 March 2023	-	
Harry Styles	Harry's House	1	13 March 2023	3× Platinum	
Miley Cyrus	Endless Summer Vacation	1	20 March 2023	Gold	
Morgan Wallen	One Thing at a Time	1	27 March 2023	Gold	
Lana Del Rey	Did You Know That There's a Tunnel Under Ocean Blvd	1	3 April 2023	Gold	
Melanie Martinez	Portals	1	10 April 2023	-	
NF	Hope	1	17 April 2023	-	
Metallica	72 Seasons	1	24 April 2023	-	
SZA	SOS	1	1 May 2023	3× Platinum	
Moses Mackay	Grace†	1	8 May 2023	-	
Ed Sheeran	-	2	15 May 2023	-	
Lewis Capaldi	Broken by Desire to Be Heavenly Sent	1	29 May 2023	-	
Taylor Swift	Midnights	1	5 June 2023	4× Platinum	
Foo Fighters	But Here We Are	1	12 June 2023	-	
Niall Horan	The Show	1	19 June 2023	-	
Queens of the Stone Age	In Times New Roman...	1	26 June 2023	-	
Taylor Swift	Midnights	1	3 July 2023	4× Platinum	
Lil Uzi Vert	Pink Tape	1	10 July 2023	-	
Taylor Swift	Speak Now (Taylor's Version)	2	17 July 2023	Platinum	
Various artists	Barbie the Album	1	31 July 2023	Gold	
Travis Scott	Utopia	2	7 August 2023	-	
Various artists	Barbie the Album	2	21 August 2023	Gold	
Zach Bryan	Zach Bryan	1	4 September 2023	-	
Various artists	Barbie the Album	1	11 September 2023	Gold	
Olivia Rodrigo	Guts	3	18 September 2023	Gold	
Home Brew	Home Brew: 11th Anniversary Edition†	1	9 October 2023	-	
Drake	For All the Dogs	2	16 October 2023	-	
The Rolling Stones	Hackney Diamonds	1	30 October 2023	-	
Taylor Swift	1989 (Taylor's Version)	6	6 November 2023	2× Platinum	
Home Brew	Run It Back†	1	18 December 2023	-	
Taylor Swift	1989 (Taylor's Version)	1	25 December 2023	2× Platinum	
Michael Bublé	Christmas	1	1 January 2024	13× Platinum	
L.A.B.	Introducing L.A.B.†	2	8 January 2024	-	
21 Savage	American Dream	1	22 January 2024	-	
Foo Fighters	The Essential Foo Fighters	1	29 January 2024	Gold	
L.A.B.	Introducing L.A.B.†	2	5 February 2024	-	
Kanye West and Ty Dolla Sign	Vultures 1	2	19 February 2024	-	
L.A.B.	L.A.B. VI†	1	4 March 2024	-	
Dartz	Dangerous Day to Be a Cold One†	1	11 March 2024	-	
Ariana Grande	Eternal Sunshine	2	18 March 2024	Gold	
Future and Metro Boomin	We Don't Trust You	1	1 April 2024	-	
Beyoncé	Cowboy Carter	1	8 April 2024	-	
J. Cole	Might Delete Later	1	15 April 2024	-	
SZA	SOS	1	22 April 2024	4× Platinum	
Taylor Swift	The Tortured Poets Department	4	29 April 2024	2× Platinum	
Billie Eilish	Hit Me Hard and Soft	8	27 May 2024	Platinum	
Eminem	The Death of Slim Shady (Coup de Grâce)	2	22 July 2024	-	
Billie Eilish	Hit Me Hard and Soft	2	5 August 2024	Platinum	
Chappell Roan	The Rise and Fall of a Midwest Princess	1	19 August 2024	Gold	
Post Malone	F-1 Trillion	1	26 August 2024	-	
Sabrina Carpenter	Short n' Sweet	7	2 September 2024	Platinum	
Charli XCX	Brat	1	21 October 2024	Gold	
Sabrina Carpenter	Short n' Sweet	1	28 October 2024	Platinum	
Tyler, the Creator	Chromakopia	2	1 November 2024 (Note: The NZ chart changed the archive date of their issues in late October 2024 along with the rebrand of their website, which also made all previous issues conform to the new Friday-based dates (making the previous issue dated 25 October 2024 and so on).)	-	
Sabrina Carpenter	Short n' Sweet	1	15 November 2024	Platinum	
Linkin Park	From Zero	1	22 November 2024	-	
Kendrick Lamar	GNX	3	29 November 2024	Gold	
Sabrina Carpenter	Short n' Sweet	1	20 December 2024	Platinum	
Michael Bublé	Christmas	1	27 December 2024	13× Platinum	
Sabrina Carpenter	Short n' Sweet	1	3 January 2025	Platinum	
SZA	SOS	3	10 January 2025	5× Platinum	
Central Cee	Can't Rush Greatness	1	31 January 2025	-	
The Weeknd	Hurry Up Tomorrow	1	7 February 2025	-	
Kendrick Lamar	GNX	1	14 February 2025	Gold	
Sabrina Carpenter	Short n' Sweet	1	21 February 2025	Platinum	
Tate McRae	So Close to What	2	28 February 2025	Platinum	
Lady Gaga	Mayhem	1	14 March 2025	-	
Playboi Carti	Music	1	21 March 2025	-	
Sabrina Carpenter	Short n' Sweet	1	28 March 2025	2× Platinum	
Ariana Grande	Eternal Sunshine	1	4 April 2025	Platinum	
Marlon Williams	Te Whare Tīwekaweka†	1	11 April 2025	-	
Sabrina Carpenter	Short n' Sweet	2	18 April 2025	2× Platinum	
Gracie Abrams	The Secret of Us	1	2 May 2025	2×Platinum	
Ed Sheeran	+–=÷× (Tour Collection)	1	9 May 2025	Platinum	
Sleep Token	Even in Arcadia	1	16 May 2025	-	
Morgan Wallen	I'm the Problem	2	23 May 2025	-	
Ed Sheeran	+–=÷× (Tour Collection)	1	6 June 2025	Platinum	
Addison Rae	Addison	1	13 June 2025	-	
Sabrina Carpenter	Short n' Sweet	1	20 June 2025	2× Platinum	
Benson Boone	American Heart	1	27 June 2025	-	
Lorde	Virgin†	1	4 July 2025	-	
Various artists	KPop Demon Hunters (Soundtrack from the Netflix Film)	1	11 July 2025	2× Platinum	
Devilskin	Re-Evolution†	1	18 July 2025	-	
Various artists	KPop Demon Hunters (Soundtrack from the Netflix Film)	6	25 July 2025	2× Platinum	
Sabrina Carpenter	Man's Best Friend	1	5 September 2025	Gold	
Various artists	KPop Demon Hunters (Soundtrack from the Netflix Film)	1	12 September 2025	2× Platinum	
Ed Sheeran	Play	1	19 September 2025	Gold	
Various artists	KPop Demon Hunters (Soundtrack from the Netflix Film)	1	26 September 2025	2× Platinum	
Olivia Dean	The Art of Loving	1	3 October 2025	3× Platinum	
Taylor Swift	The Life of a Showgirl	4	10 October 2025	2× Platinum	
Olivia Dean	The Art of Loving	15	7 November 2025	3× Platinum	
Six60	Right Here Right Now†	1	20 February 2026	–	
Olivia Dean	The Art of Loving	2	27 February 2026	3× Platinum	
Harry Styles	Kiss All the Time. Disco, Occasionally.	1	13 March 2026	Gold	
Olivia Dean	The Art of Loving	1	20 March 2026	3× Platinum	
BTS	Arirang	1	27 March 2026	Gold	
Olivia Dean	The Art of Loving	4	3 April 2026	3× Platinum	
Noah Kahan	The Great Divide	2	1 May 2026	Gold	
Michael Jackson	Michael: Songs from the Motion Picture	1	15 May 2026	Gold	
Drake	Iceman	2	22 May 2026	Gold	
Michael Jackson	Michael: Songs from the Motion Picture	2	5 June 2026	Gold	
Olivia Rodrigo	You Seem Pretty Sad for a Girl So in Love	5	19 June 2026	Gold	
Gracie Abrams	Daughter from Hell	1	24 July 2026	–	
Charli XCX	Music, Fashion, Film	1	31 July 2026	–	
Ariana Grande	Petal	1	7 August 2026	–	
Mel Parsons	Castle Hill†	1	14 August 2026	–	
Phoebe Bridgers	Lost Weekend	1	21 August 2026	–	
Olivia Dean	The Art of Loving	1	28 August 2026	4× Platinum	
Alex Warren	Wildchild	1	4 September 2026	–	
Olivia Dean	The Art of Loving	3	11 September 2026	4× Platinum	
Taylor Swift	The Life of a Showgirl	1	2 October 2026	3× Platinum	
Olivia Dean	The Art of Loving	7	9 October 2026	4× Platinum	
