= Introducing L.A.B. =

2023 album by L.A.B.

Compilation album by L.A.B.
- Released: 13 October 2023
- Genre: Reggae; soul; funk; blues; pop
- Length: 44:12
- Label: Loop

L.A.B. chronology
L.A.B. in Dub (2022)	Introducing L.A.B. (2023)	L.A.B. VI (2024)

Introducing L.A.B. is a compilation album released by New Zealand band L.A.B. Originally released in Europe in October 2023 as a sampler to promote their European tour, the album received a wide release in New Zealand in December 2023, reaching number one the following month.

== Production ==
In October 2023, L.A.B. held their first performances in the Northern Hemisphere, when they performed shows at the Paradiso in Amsterdam, and the O2 Forum Kentish Town in the United Kingdom. Introducing L.A.B. was produced as a sampler to commemorate the shows, and sold only in European territories.

The album features two songs from L.A.B. (2017), three tracks from L.A.B. III (2019), three from L.A.B. IV (2020), one from L.A.B. V (2021), and "Take It Away", the band's 2022 single from their to-be released sixth album. No songs from L.A.B. II (2018) feature on the album.

== Release and promotion ==
The album was released on 14 October 2023 on vinyl in Europe. This was followed by a wide release in New Zealand on 15 December, where the album was released on vinyl, streaming and as a digital download, where the album debuted at number four, reaching a peak of number one in early January.

== Track listing ==
Introducing L.A.B. track listing
No.	Title	Writer(s)	Length
1.	"Ain't No Use"	L.A.B.; B. Kora; J. Shadbolt	4:40
2.	"Controller"	B. Kora	4:35
3.	"In the Air"	B. Kora; L.A.B	4:12
4.	"Yes I Do"	A. Adams-Tamatea; B. Kora; H. Kora; J. Shadbolt; M. Gregory	5:10
5.	"For the Love of Jane"	B. Kora	4:53
6.	"Why Oh Why"	A. Adams-Tamatea; B. Kora; H. Kora; J. Shadbolt; M. Gregory	4:50
7.	"No Roots"	A. Adams-Tamatea; B. Kora; H. Kora; J. Shadbolt; M. Gregory	4:52
8.	"Mr Reggae"	Billy Kaui	3:04
9.	"Personify"	B. Kora; L.A.B	4:24
10.	"Take It Away"	A. Adams-Tamatea; B. Kora; H. Kora; J. Shadbolt; M. Gregory	3:32
Total length:			44:12

== Charts ==
=== Weekly charts ===
Weekly chart performance for Introducing L.A.B.
Chart (2023–2024)	Peak position
New Zealand Albums (RMNZ)	1

=== Year-end charts ===
2024 year-end chart performance for Introducing L.A.B.
Chart (2024)	Position
New Zealand Albums (RMNZ)	6

2025 year-end chart performance for Introducing L.A.B.
Chart (2025)	Position
New Zealand Albums (RMNZ)	29

== Certifications ==
Certifications for Introducing L.A.B.
Region	Certification	Certified units/sales
New Zealand (RMNZ)	Platinum	15,000^{‡}
^{‡} Sales+streaming figures based on certification alone.
