= List of year-end number-one singles (New Zealand) =

This is a list of year-end number-one singles for New Zealand. Recorded Music NZ publishes the country's official weekly record charts. L.A.B's "In the Air" has spent the most time on the music charts out of any of the other Year end No.1 singles. It has spent 150 weeks on the charts, still counting.

== Number-one singles ==
Key
† – Song of New Zealand origin (Note: Whether or not a song is of New Zealand origin is determined by the RIANZ)

Year	Artist	Title	Certification	Weeks on chart (Note: The number of weeks given is the number of weeks that the song spent on the chart that year.)	Weeks at number one (Note: The number of weeks given is the number of weeks that the song spent at number one that year.)	References
1975	Freddy Fender	"Before the Next Teardrop Falls"		35	0 (Note: "Before the Next Teardrop Falls" peaked at No.2 for two weeks.)	
1976	ABBA	"Fernando"		32	9	
1977	Heatwave	"Boogie Nights"		21	7	
1978	Boney M.	"Rivers of Babylon"		26	14	
1979	Blondie	"Heart of Glass"		23	4	
1980	Ritz	"Locomotion"		19	7	
1981	Stars on 45	"Stars on 45"		18	7	
1982	Toots and the Maytals	"Beautiful Woman"		24	5	
1983	New Order	"Blue Monday"		32	0 (Note: "Blue Monday" peaked at No.2 for two weeks.)	
1984	Pātea Māori Club	"Poi E"		22	4	
1985	USA For Africa	"We Are the World"	Platinum	14	7	
1986	All of Us	"Sailing Away"	Platinum	31	9	
1987	Pseudo Echo	"Funky Town"	Gold	19	6	
1988	Holidaymakers	"Sweet Lovers"	Gold	22	6	
1989	Simply Red	"If You Don't Know Me by Now"	Gold	16	5	
1990	MC Hammer	"U Can't Touch This"	Gold	29	6	
1991	Bryan Adams	"(Everything I Do) I Do It for You"	Platinum	14	8	
1992	Billy Ray Cyrus	"Achy Breaky Heart"	Platinum	15	6	
1993	UB40	"(I Can't Help") Falling in Love with You"	Platinum	23	11	
1994	Wet Wet Wet	"Love Is All Around"	Platinum	23	4	
1995	Coolio	"Gangsta's Paradise"	Platinum	9	9	
1996	Bone Thugs-n-Harmony	"Tha Crossroads"	Platinum	19	6	
1997	Elton John	"Something About the Way You Look Tonight"/"Candle in the Wind 1997"	Platinum	12	6	
1998	Boyzone	"No Matter What"	Platinum	11	6	
1999	Lou Bega	"Mambo No. 5 (A Little Bit of...)"	Platinum x3	16	6	
2000	Anastacia	"I'm Outta Love"	Platinum	32	7	
2001	Craig David	"Walking Away"	Platinum	30	2	
2002	Avril Lavigne	"Complicated"	Platinum	23	9	
2003	Scribe	"Stand Up"/"Not Many"	Platinum	21	12	
2004	Ben Lummis	"They Can't Take That Away"	Platinum x4	14	7	
2005	Crazy Frog	"Axel F"	Platinum x2	33	12	
2006	Gnarls Barkley	"Crazy"	Gold	29	7	
2007	Rihanna featuring Jay-Z	"Umbrella"	Platinum x2	24	6	
2008	Jordin Sparks featuring Chris Brown	"No Air"	Platinum	24	7	
2009	The Black Eyed Peas	"I Gotta Feeling"	Platinum x3	39	9	
2010	J. Williams featuring Scribe	"You Got Me"	Platinum x2	22	4	
2011	LMFAO featuring Lauren Bennett and GoonRock	"Party Rock Anthem"	Platinum x4	43	11	
2012	Carly Rae Jepsen	"Call Me Maybe"	Platinum x3	34	5	
2013	Robin Thicke featuring Pharrell Williams and T.I.	"Blurred Lines"	Platinum x5	32	11	
2014	Pharrell Williams	"Happy"	Platinum x6	52	15	
2015	Mark Ronson featuring Bruno Mars	"Uptown Funk"	Platinum x5	41	9	
2016	Drake featuring Wizkid and Kyla	"One Dance"	Platinum x2	36	13	
2017	Ed Sheeran	"Shape of You"	Platinum x6	50	13	
2018	Drake	"God's Plan"	Platinum x2	29	8	
2019	Lil Nas X	"Old Town Road"	Platinum x4	40	12	
2020	L.A.B	"In the Air"	Platinum x10	150	3	
2021	Glass Animals	"Heat Waves"	Platinum x6	97	0	
2022	Elton John and Dua Lipa	"Cold Heart (Pnau remix)"	Platinum x5	76	9	
