= Yes I Do =

Yes I Do may refer to:

== Music ==
=== Albums ===
- Yes I Do (Anne Murray album), 1991

=== Songs ===
- "Yes I Do" (song), a 2020 song by L.A.B.
- "Yes I Do", song by Rascal Flatts from Me and My Gang
- "Yes I Do", song by The Psychedelic Furs from Forever Now (The Psychedelic Furs album)
- "Yes I Do", song by Terri Walker from L.O.V.E (album)
- "Yes I Do", song by Pentagram from First Daze Here Too, covered by Witchcraft single 2012
- "Yes I Do", song by Marvin Phillips (singer), Lottie, Ling 1956
- "Yes I Do", song by James Wayne (R&B musician), Wayne, Scott 1957
- "Yes I Do", song by Dorian (Scottish band), Vernon Dicks 1959
- "Yes I Do", single by Solomon Burke, Russell 1964
- "Yes I Do", song by Ram John Holder, Ram John Holder 1968
- "Yes I Do", single by Harpo (singer), Jan "Harpo" Svensson 1981
- "Yes I Do", song by Penny DeHaven, Mary Fielder, Robert Thames 1984
- "Yes I Do", single by Shakin' Stevens, G. Sulsh, S. Leathwood, B. Guard 1990
- "Yes I Do", song by Toshinori Yonekura, 1997
- "Yes I Do", song by The Attic (band), G. Rainford, J. James, R. Rycroft
- "Yes I Do", song by Monika Christodoulou, 2010
