= Controller (song) =

2018 single by L.A.B.

Single by L.A.B.

from the album L.A.B.
- Released: 31 July 2018
- Genre: contemporary R&B
- Length: 4:35
- Label: Loop Recordings Aot(ear)oa
- Songwriter(s): Brad Kora
- Producer(s): Brad Kora

L.A.B. singles chronology
| "Umulash" (2017) | "Controller" (2018) | "Midnight Summer" (2018) |

Music video
- "Controller" on YouTube

"Controller" is a song by New Zealand band L.A.B., released as a single from their debut album L.A.B. in mid-2018. After the success of the band's song "In the Air" (2019), the song became a hit in New Zealand.

== Composition ==
"Controller" was one of the first songs the band L.A.B. wrote, inspired by the story of a woman who falls blindly in love with a controlling man. The song incorporates 1980s-style pop synths and percussion.

== Release ==
The song was released as a single in July 2018, alongside the release of the song's music video, directed by Shae Sterling. The song became a hit in 2020 after the release of the band's single "In the Air", becoming the 8th most successful single by a New Zealand artist in 2020.

The song was compiled onto the band's 2023 album Introducing L.A.B., originally produced as a sampler for their debut European performances.

== Critical reception ==
Dave Tucker of Ambient Light Blog reviewed the song positively, calling it "[the] perfect single piece of team mastery, combin[ing] a sweet soulful sincerity that I like a lot."

== Credits and personnel ==
- A. Adams-Tamatea – bass
- B. Kora – arrangement, drums, lyrics, producer, sampling, songwriting
- S. Kora – synth
- J. Shadbolt – vocals

== Charts ==
=== Weekly charts ===
| Chart (2021) | Peak position |
|---|---|
| New Zealand (Recorded Music NZ) | 3 |

=== Year-end charts ===
| Chart (2020) | Position |
|---|---|
| New Zealand (Recorded Music NZ) | 20 |
| Chart (2021) | Position |
| New Zealand (Recorded Music NZ) | 9 |
| Chart (2022) | Position |
| New Zealand (Recorded Music NZ) | 25 |

== Certifications ==
Certifications for "Controller"
| Region | Certification | Certified units/sales |
|---|---|---|
| New Zealand (RMNZ) | 10× Platinum | 300,000^{‡} |
^{‡} Sales+streaming figures based on certification alone.
