= Yes I Do (song) =

2021 single by L.A.B.

Single by L.A.B.

from the album L.A.B. IV
- Released: 28 July 2021
- Genre: Soul
- Length: 5:10
- Label: Loop Recordings Aot(ear)oa
- Songwriters: L.A.B., Brad Kora
- Producer: L.A.B.

L.A.B. singles chronology
"Why Oh Why" (2020)	"Yes I Do" (2021)	"Mr Reggae" (2021)

"Yes I Do" is a song by New Zealand band L.A.B., released on their album L.A.B. IV in December 2020. The song was released as a single in July 2021, and since its release has been certified double platinum in New Zealand.

== Background and release ==
L.A.B. began working on writing and recording sessions for L.A.B. IV in 2020, and were able to spend more time focused on writing the record due to the effects of the COVID-19 pandemic on the band's ability to tour. "Yes I Do" was released in July 2021, after the band's summer performances at Mount Smart Stadium in Auckland and the Bowl of Brooklands in New Plymouth, while the band began work on their following album L.A.B. V.

The song was compiled onto the band's 2023 album Introducing L.A.B., originally produced as a sampler for their debut European performances.

== Critical reception ==
Tim Gruar of Ambient Light Blog likened the song to works by Stevie Wonder and Percy Sledge, especially Wonder's "Isn't She Lovely". He praised the song's use of strings and "funky guitar", as well as Joel Shadbolt's "sugar, sweet, charming and soothing" vocals, and despite overall praise, felt the song was slightly too familiar to other works. Reggae Vibes reviewers likened the song's use of strings and "fat bass and horns" to the mid-1970s works of Al Green.

== Credits and personnel ==
- A. Adams-Tamatea – bass
- The Black Quartet – violin, viola
- Mahuia Bridgman-Cooper – string composition and arrangement
- James Guilford – trumpet
- L.A.B. – arrangement, songwriting
- B. Kora – backing vocals, drums, lyrics
- S. Kora – backing vocals, keys
- M. Gregory – backing vocals, B3 organ, keys
- J Shadbolt – lead guitar, lead & backing vocals
- Kaito Walley – trombone
- Louisa Williamson – tenor saxophone

== Charts ==
Chart (2020)	Peak position
New Zealand (Recorded Music NZ)	13

== Certifications ==
Certifications for "Yes I Do"
Region	Certification	Certified units/sales
New Zealand (RMNZ)	4× Platinum	120,000^{‡}
^{‡} Sales+streaming figures based on certification alone.
