= Cinderella (JKing song) =

Single by JKing
- Released: 1 June 2023
- Length: 1:56
- Label: Biordi
- Songwriter: Jordan Samatua
- Producer: Mo Musiq

JKing singles chronology
| "Chance with You" (2023) | "Cinderella" (2023) | "Falling in Love" (2023) |

Music video
- "Cinderella" on YouTube

"Cinderella" is a song by Australian singer JKing. It was released in June 2023 and peaked at number 2 on the New Zealand (Recorded Music NZ) singles chart.

At the APRA Music Awards of 2024, the song won Most Performed R&B / Soul Work.

== Charts ==
=== Weekly charts ===
Weekly chart performance for "Cinderella"
| Chart (2023) | Peak position |
|---|---|
| New Zealand (Recorded Music NZ) | 2 |

=== Year-end charts ===
Year-end chart performance for ""Cinderella""
| Chart (2023) | Position |
|---|---|
| New Zealand (Recorded Music NZ) | 50 |

== Certifications ==
Certifications
| Region | Certification | Certified units/sales |
|---|---|---|
| Australia (ARIA) | Gold | 35,000^{‡} |
| New Zealand (RMNZ) | 3× Platinum | 90,000^{‡} |
^{‡} Sales+streaming figures based on certification alone.

== See also ==
- New Zealand top 50 singles of 2023
