= JKing =

- Also known as: JKing
- Born: Jordan Samatua
- Origin: Sydney, Australia
- Genres: Hip hop
- Occupation: Rapper
- Years active: 2019–present
- Label: BIORDI

Jordan Samatua, known professionally as JKing is an Australian hip hop rapper, originating from Sydney, Australia. He is best known for his 2023 "Cinderella".

== History ==
In 2019, JKing released "Bend Over" with Tiztana.

In 2023, JKing released "Cinderella". The song peaked at number 2 on the Official New Zealand Music Chart and made the New Zealand top 50 singles of 2023.

In 2023, JKing released the EP Christmas Jamz.

== Personal life ==
Samatua parents are from Matautu and Falelatai villages in Samoa. Samatua was born and raised in Sydney.

== Discography ==
=== Extended plays ===
List of extended plays, with selected details
Title	EP details
Wahyahsey	Released: September 2022; Label: BIORDI; Formats: digital
Christmas Jamz	Released: December 2023; Label: BIORDI; Formats: digital

=== Charted or certified singles ===
List of singles, with selected chart positions, showing year released and album name
Title	Year	Peak chart positions		Certification	Album
Title	Year	NZ	NZ Hot	Certification	Album
"Energy" (with Youngn Lipz)	2020	—	—	ARIA: Gold	Neverland (original soundtrack)
"Higher" (with DJ Discretion & Billymaree)	2022	—	15	RMNZ: Gold	Non-album single
"Unconditionally"	2022	—	19	RMNZ: Platinum	Wahyahsey
"Cinderella"	2023	2	1	ARIA: Gold; RMNZ: 3× Platinum	Non-album singles
"Falling in Love" (with Dinah Jane)	2023	—	6	RMNZ: Gold	Non-album singles
"Life in Your Hands"	2023	—	14	RMNZ: Gold	Non-album singles
"Darling with You"	2023	—	33		Christmas Jamz
"Into You" (with Drew Deezy)	2024	—	36		Non-album singles
"My Only One"	2024	—	36		Non-album singles
"My Girl" (with Jordan Gavet)	2024	—	32		Non-album singles
"Pele Moni"	2024	—	19		Non-album singles
"Thank You"	2025	—	10		Non-album singles
"—" denotes a recording that did not chart or was not released in that territory.

== Awards and nominations ==
=== APRA Awards ===
The APRA Awards are presented annually from 1982 by the Australasian Performing Right Association (APRA), "honouring composers and songwriters". They commenced in 1982.

Year	Nominee / work	Award	Result	Ref.
2024	"Cinderella" (Jordan Samatua)	Most Performed R&B / Soul Work	Won	
