= Casanova (LeVert song) =

1987 single by LeVert

Single by LeVert

from the album The Big Throwdown
- B-side: "Throwdown"
- Released: June 20, 1987
- Genre: New jack swing
- Length: 6:09
- Label: Atlantic
- Songwriter: Reggie Calloway
- Producer: Reggie Calloway

LeVert singles chronology
"Fascination" (1987)	"Casanova" (1987)	"My Forever Love" (1987)

"Casanova" is a song by American R&B vocal group LeVert, written and produced by Reggie Calloway. Released as a single in 1987, it reached number five on the US Billboard Hot 100 chart and number nine on the UK Singles Chart—LeVert's only top-40 hit on either chart. It was the first new jack swing song to reach number one on the Billboard Hot Black Singles chart, topping the chart for two weeks. It has become a standard number for New Orleans brass bands following its popularization by the Rebirth Brass Band.

== Music video ==
The official music video was directed by Jane Simpson.

== Charts ==
=== Weekly charts ===
Chart (1987–1988)	Peak position
Canada Top Singles (RPM)	16
Ireland (IRMA)	17
Netherlands (Dutch Top 40)	25
Netherlands (Single Top 100)	27
New Zealand (Recorded Music NZ)	26
UK Singles (Official Charts)	9
US Billboard Hot 100	5
US Dance Club Songs (Billboard)	27
US Hot R&B/Hip-Hop Songs (Billboard)	1
West Germany (GfK)	10

=== Year-end charts ===
Chart (1987)	Position
Canada Top Singles (RPM)	98
US Billboard Hot 100	71
US Hot Crossover Singles (Billboard)	22

== Ultimate Kaos version ==
"Casanova"

Single by Ultimate Kaos

from the album The Kaos Theory
- Released: February 17, 1997
- Length: 3:53
- Label: Polydor; Mercury
- Songwriter: Reggie Calloway
- Producers: Mike Stock; Matt Aitken

Ultimate Kaos singles chronology
"Right Here" (1995)	"Casanova" (1997)	"Anything You Want (I've Got It)" (1999)

British boy band Ultimate Kaos released a cover of "Casanova" as the lead single from their second album, The Kaos Theory, in February 1997. It reached the top 10 in Belgium, France, and the Netherlands. On June 1, 1998, it was re-released and entered the top 20 in Australia.

=== Track listing ===
CD maxi

1. "Casanova" (7-inch mix)
2. "Casanova" (7-inch club mix)
3. "Casanova" (C&J R&B mix)
4. "Who's Got the Flavour"

=== Charts ===
==== Weekly charts ====
Chart (1997–1998)	Peak position
Australia (ARIA)	18
Austria (Ö3 Austria Top 40)	20
Belgium (Ultratop 50 Flanders)	6
Belgium (Ultratop 50 Wallonia)	6
Denmark (IFPI)	10
Europe (Eurochart Hot 100)	17
France (SNEP)	4
Germany (GfK)	37
Iceland (Íslenski Listinn Topp 40)	35
Netherlands (Dutch Top 40)	2
Netherlands (Single Top 100)	2
Scottish Singles Sales (Official Charts)	37
Spain (Top 40 Radio)	15
Sweden (Sverigetopplistan)	19
Switzerland (Schweizer Hitparade)	39
UK Singles (Official Charts)	24
UK Hip Hop/R&B (Official Charts)	6

==== Year-end charts ====
Chart (1998)	Position
Australia (ARIA)	65
Belgium (Ultratop 50 Flanders)	30
Belgium (Ultratop 50 Wallonia)	26
Europe (Eurochart Hot 100)	53
France (SNEP)	45
Netherlands (Single Top 100)	42

=== Certifications ===
Region	Certification	Certified units/sales
Australia (ARIA)	Gold	35,000^{^}
Belgium (BRMA)	Gold	25,000^{*}
France (SNEP)	Gold	250,000^{*}
^{*} Sales figures based on certification alone.^{^} Shipments figures based on certification alone.

== L.A.B. version ==
"Casanova"

Single by L.A.B.

from the album L.A.B. VI
- Released: September 22, 2023
- Length: 3:38
- Label: Loop Recordings Aot(ear)oa
- Producer: Brad Kora

L.A.B. singles chronology
"Take It Away" (2022)	"Casanova" (2023)	"Oh No (Pt. 2)" (2023)

Music video
- "Casanova" on YouTube

New Zealand pop-reggae band L.A.B. released a cover of the song on September 22, 2023. L.A.B.'s version was produced by band member Brad Kora. The band's vocalist Joel Shadbolt felt that their rendition was more upbeat and "hyped up" compared to their typical reggae-influenced music.

The song was released just prior to the band's October European tour, and is the second single taken from their sixth album, released in February 2024. In its first week, the song reached number 39 on the New Zealand Singles Chart, and was the second-highest performing track by a New Zealand artist that week.

=== Charts ===
Chart (2024)	Peak position
New Zealand (Recorded Music NZ)	30

=== Certifications ===
Certifications for "Casanova"
Region	Certification	Certified units/sales
New Zealand (RMNZ)	2× Platinum	60,000^{‡}
^{‡} Sales+streaming figures based on certification alone.
