= Under the Sun (L.A.B. song) =

2021 single by L.A.B.

Single by L.A.B.

from the album L.A.B. V
- Released: 17 December 2021
- Genre: country rock
- Length: 4:52
- Label: Loop Recordings Aot(ear)oa
- Songwriter: Brad Kora
- Producer: Brad Kora

L.A.B. singles chronology
"Mr Reggae" (2021)	"Under the Sun" (2021)	"Real Ones" (2022)

"Under the Sun" is a country rock song by New Zealand band L.A.B., released as a single from their album L.A.B. V in December 2021. The song was a commercial success, debuting at number 12 in New Zealand, and becoming the 35th most successful song of 2022 in the country.

== Background and composition ==
The song was written in mid-2021, by band member Brad Kora, who also produced the track. The song was debuted by the band as a part of their 2021 tour.

== Release ==
The song was released as a single by L.A.B. on 17 December 2021, on the same day as the album L.A.B. V was released.

== Critical reception ==
Alex Behan of Stuff felt "blow[n] away" by the track, feeling that it was like a song released by a different band. Behan praised the song as "perfectly structured, with just a tinge of country twang that sounds like it could have existed forever." Tim Gruar of Ambient Light Blog gave the song a mixed review, feeling it was a middle of the road track.

== Credits and personnel ==
- A Adams-Tamatea – bass
- M Gregory – organ, piano
- B Kora – drums, lyrics, percussion, producer, songwriting
- S Kora – acoustic guitar
- L.A.B. – arrangement
- J Shadbolt – backing vocals, electric guitar, lap steel guitar, lead vocals

== Charts ==
=== Weekly charts ===
Chart (2021)	Peak position
New Zealand (Recorded Music NZ)	12

=== Year-end charts ===
Chart (2022)	Position
New Zealand (Recorded Music NZ)	35

== Certifications ==
Certifications for "Under the Sun"
Region	Certification	Certified units/sales
New Zealand (RMNZ)	3× Platinum	90,000^{‡}
^{‡} Sales+streaming figures based on certification alone.
