= Coming Home (Sol3 Mio album) =

2021 album by Sol3 Mio

Studio album by Sol3 Mio
- Released: 12 November 2021
- Genre: Classical crossover
- Length: 49:34
- Label: Universal Music New Zealand
- Producer: Nic Manders

Sol3 Mio chronology
A Very M3rry Christmas (2017)	Coming Home (2021)

Singles from Coming Home
- 1. "E Ipo" Released: 21 October 2021

Coming Home is the fourth studio album by New Zealand classical crossover band Sol3 Mio, released on 12 November 2021.

== Production ==
The album featured a stripped-back production compared to the trio's previous albums. The album was recorded over four days during a gap in the group's touring schedule in 2021, and is a collection of live recordings performed at Roundhead Studios in Auckland. The songs the trio selected to cover for the album represent songs from their childhoods, to help their audience understand where their musical influences came from.

== Release and promotion ==
The first single from the album was their cover of Prince Tui Teka's "E Ipo", which was released on 21 October. Sol3 Mio performed the Coming Home Tour in October 2022, performing four dates across New Zealand including Spark Arena in Auckland and the Michael Fowler Centre in Wellington.

== Track listing ==
Coming Home track listing
No.	Title	Writer(s)	Length
1.	"Hold Me While You Wait"	Jamie Commons; Jamie Hartman; Lewis Capaldi	4:01
2.	"If"	David Gates	2:58
3.	"A Thousand Years"	Christina Perri; David Hodges	3:14
4.	"Blue Bayou"	Joe Melson; Roy Orbison	4:30
5.	"Romanza"	Mauro Malavasi	4:04
6.	"E Ipo"	Ngoi Pēwhairangi; Prince Tui Teka	4:38
7.	"To Love Somebody"	Barry Gibb; Robin Gibb	3:40
8.	"Don't Worry Be Happy"	Bobby McFerrin	3:58
9.	"Sylvia's Mother"	Sheldon Silverstein	3:58
10.	"Hallelujah"	Leonard Cohen	3:52
11.	"Used to Love You"	John Stevens; Kanye West	2:49
12.	"Arms of an Angel"	Sarah McLachlan	5:52
Total length:			49:34

== Charts ==
=== Weekly charts ===
Weekly chart performance for Coming Home
Chart (2021)	Peak position
New Zealand Albums (RMNZ)	2

=== Year-end charts ===
Year-end chart performance for Coming Home
Chart (2021)	Position
New Zealand Albums (RMNZ)	42
