= Why Oh Why (L.A.B. song) =

2020 single by L.A.B.

Single by L.A.B.

from the album L.A.B. IV
- Released: 4 December 2020
- Genre: roots reggae
- Length: 4:50
- Label: Loop Recordings Aot(ear)oa
- Songwriter: Brad Kora
- Producer: Brad Kora

L.A.B. singles chronology
"My Brother" (2020)	"Why Oh Why" (2020)	"Yes I Do" (2021)

"Why Oh Why" is a roots reggae song by New Zealand band L.A.B., released as a single from their album L.A.B. IV in December 2020. The song was a success, debuting at number one in New Zealand, and winning the Aotearoa Music Award for Single of the Year.

== Background and composition ==
L.A.B. began working on writing and recording sessions for L.A.B. IV in 2020, and were able to spend more time focused on writing the record due to the effects of the COVID-19 pandemic had on the band's ability to tour. "Why Oh Why" was the lack track made during these sessions, written and recorded in a single day. The song was not something the band intended to create, but developed "fully formed" through the band's writing processes.

== Release ==
"Why Oh Why" was released as a single on 4 December, two weeks before their album L.A.B. IV. The song debuted at number one in New Zealand, becoming their second number one single for 2020, after "In the Air". In May 2021, a music video was released for the song, directed by Mumu Moore and showing the band exploring the Wellington suburb of Newtown.

The song was compiled onto the band's 2023 album Introducing L.A.B., originally produced as a sampler for their debut European performances.

== Critical reception ==
Tim Gruar of Ambient Light Blog felt the song was "a perfect earworm and another surefire banger", likening the song's beginning to Lee "Scratch" Perry and noting the song's "soft and empathetic" lyrics similar to "In the Air". Reggae Vibes reviewers praised the song's "steady rolling infectious reggae beat laced with mild sound fx", calling the track a "swinging lovers tune...that will keep happy a whole summer".

At the 2021 Aotearoa Music Awards, "Why Oh Why" won the Single of the Year award.

== Credits and personnel ==
- A. Adams-Tamatea – bass, drum programming
- M. Gregory – backing vocals, keys
- B. Kora – arrangement, drum programming, lyrics, percussion, songwriting
- S. Kora – keys, piano
- J Shadbolt – guitar, lead & backing vocals

== Charts ==
=== Weekly charts ===
Chart (2020)	Peak position
New Zealand (Recorded Music NZ)	1

=== Year-end charts ===
Chart (2021)	Position
New Zealand (Recorded Music NZ)	4
Chart (2022)	Position
New Zealand (Recorded Music NZ)	39

== Certifications ==
Certifications for "Why Oh Why"
Region	Certification	Certified units/sales
New Zealand (RMNZ)	8× Platinum	240,000^{‡}
^{‡} Sales+streaming figures based on certification alone.
