= Take It Away (L.A.B. song) =

2022 single by L.A.B.

Single by L.A.B.

from the album L.A.B. VI
- Released: 9 December 2022
- Genre: Pop, reggae
- Length: 3:32
- Label: Loop Recordings Aot(ear)oa
- Songwriters: Ara Adams-Tamatea; Brad Kora; Joel Shadbolt; Miharo Gregory; Stu Kora

L.A.B. singles chronology
"Real Ones" (2022)	"Take It Away" (2022)	"Casanova" (2023)

Music video
- "Take It Away" on YouTube

"Take It Away" is a song by New Zealand band L.A.B., released as a single from their album L.A.B. VI in December 2022.

== Composition ==
"Take It Away" is a reggae-inspired pop song with elements of rock music. The song, along with the rest of the material for the band's album L.A.B. VI was written and recorded in mid-2022. The song was recorded in a single take.

== Release ==
"Take It Away" was released as the lead single from the band's album L.A.B. VI on 9 December 2022. Over the 2022/2023 New Zealand summer, the band performed concerts in Tauranga, Hastings, Whangārei and Christchurch, followed by an Australian tour in April and May.

The song was compiled onto the band's 2023 album Introducing L.A.B., originally produced as a sampler for their debut European performances.

== Critical reception ==
"Take It Away" won the best single award at the 2023 Rolling Stone Aotearoa Awards.

== Charts ==
=== Weekly charts ===
Weekly chart performance for "Take It Away"
Chart (2022)	Peak position
New Zealand (Recorded Music NZ)	13

=== Year-end charts ===
Year-end chart performance for "Take It Away"
Chart (2023)	Position
New Zealand (Recorded Music NZ)	23

== Certifications ==
Certifications for "Take It Away"
Region	Certification	Certified units/sales
New Zealand (RMNZ)	4× Platinum	120,000^{‡}
^{‡} Sales+streaming figures based on certification alone.
