= Coming in from the Dark =

2021 album by Hollie Smith

Studio album by Hollie Smith
- Released: 22 October 2021
- Genre: soul; funk
- Label: Soundsmith Records; Warner Music New Zealand

Hollie Smith chronology
Water or Gold (2016)	Coming in from the Dark (2021)

Singles from Coming in from the Dark
- 1. "Coming in from the Dark" Released: 30 July 2021; 2. "What About" Released: 10 September 2021; 3. "Something Good" Released: 1 October 2021

Coming in from the Dark is the sixth studio album by New Zealand soul musician Hollie Smith, released in October 2021. The album reached number one on the New Zealand Albums Chart.

== Production ==
The album was intended to be recorded in 2020, however due to the COVID-19 pandemic in New Zealand, recording sessions were postponed until 2021. Smith self-produced the record, and featured a number of New Zealand musicians on the album, including the New Zealand Symphony Orchestra, rapper Raiza Biza, classical crossover trio Sol3 Mio and soul singer Teeks. After the New Zealand Symphony Orchestra recorded instrumental backing to three songs on the album, Smith was inspired to incorporate strings throughout the entire record.

The song "You" was the first track written for the album in 2016, inspired by the Syrian refugee crisis and the 2016 United States elections. "Heaven Only Knows" was written in 2020 during the George Floyd protests, and "Damage Done" expresses Smith's frustration at resistance met against the Black Lives Matter and the MeToo movements. The song "Billy" was written as a tribute to Smith's first love, who died of lymphoma.

== Release and promotion ==
"Coming in from the Dark" featuring the New Zealand Symphony Orchestra was the first single released from the album, on 30 July 2021. The song was recorded bilingually, with both English and Māori language versions featured on the single. This was followed by "What About" featuring Raiza Biza in September, and "Something Good" in early October.

Smith toured Coming in from the Dark in July 2022, performing seven dates across New Zealand. The tour was intended to be held in November 2021, but was postponed to February 2022, and eventually held in July.

== Track listing ==
Coming in from the Dark track listing
No.	Title	Writer(s)	Length
1.	"Coming in from the Dark" (featuring the New Zealand Symphony Orchestra)	Hollie Smith	3:13
2.	"Tell Me"	Smith	4:29
3.	"Something Good"	Smith	4:09
4.	"The One to Go"	Smith	3:23
5.	"What About" (featuring Raiza Biza)	Smith; Raiza Biza	4:09
6.	"Beside Me"	Smith	3:31
7.	"Heaven Only Knows"	Smith	3:28
8.	"Billy"	Smith	4:10
9.	"Lay Me Down to Sleep" (featuring the New Zealand Symphony Orchestra)	Smith	3:50
10.	"Damage Done"	Smith	3:36
11.	"You" (featuring the New Zealand Symphony Orchestra)	Smith	4:45
Total length:			42:43

== Credits and personnel ==
- Raiza Biza – featured artist (5), songwriter (5)
- Courtney Burchell – artwork
- Chris Chetland – mastering
- Steve Dykes – photography
- Jordan Foster – artwork
- Mike Gibson – recording assistant
- Melody Gumbley – violin
- Daniel Hayles – piano, keyboards, synth
- Graham Kennedy – recording (1, 9, 11)
- Johnny Lawrence – bass, synthesiser (minimoog)
- Ben Lawson – recording (5–6)
- Yotam Levy – cello
- Toby Lloyd – mixing engineer, vocal recording
- Moses Mackay – featured vocalist (11)
- Nic Manders – recording (11)
- Darren Mathiassen – drums
- Courtney Mayall – backing vocals
- Jeremy Mayall – string arrangements, quartet and background vocal recording
- Hamish McKeich – conductor (1, 9, 11)
- Jol Mulholland – guitar (5–8)
- Chris Nation – viola
- New Zealand Symphony Orchestra – featured artist (1, 9, 11)
- Amitai Pati – featured vocalist (11)
- Pene Pati – featured vocalist (11)
- Alex Pelham-Waerea – backing vocals
- Ryan Prebble – recording
- Jess Ruck-Nu'u – backing vocals
- Hollie Smith – arranger, recording (additional vocals), producer, songwriter, vocalist
- Sol3 Mio – featured artist (11)
- Sharon Stephens – violin
- Tyrell Tamaki – backing vocals
- Teeks – featured artist (6)
- Emma Thornton – backing vocals

== Charts ==
=== Weekly charts ===
Weekly chart performance for Coming in from the Dark
Chart	Peak position
New Zealand Albums (RMNZ)	1

=== Year-end charts ===
Year-end chart performance for Coming in from the Dark
Chart (2021)	Position
New Zealand Albums (RMNZ)	20
