= Mr. Reggae =

1977 song by Billy Kaui covered by L.A.B.

"Mr Reggae"

Single by L.A.B.

from the album L.A.B. V
- Released: 26 November 2021
- Genre: Reggae
- Length: 3:04
- Label: Loop Recordings Aot(ear)oa
- Songwriter: Billy Kaui
- Producer: Brad Kora

L.A.B. singles chronology
"Yes I Do" (2021)	"Mr Reggae" (2021)	"Under the Sun" (2021)

"Mr. Reggae" is a song by Hawaiian musician Billy Kaui of the band Country Comfort, released on his debut album Billy Kaui in 1977. The song was a hit for New Zealand band L.A.B. after they released as the lead single from their album L.A.B. V in November 2021, reaching number three in New Zealand, and winning the Aotearoa Music Award for Single of the Year.

== Background and composition ==
"Mr. Reggae" was a reggae-influenced song released by Hawaiian musician Billy Kaui in 1977, a year after the break-up of his band Country Comfort. It is the first known commercial recording by a Hawaiian musician featuring reggae influences, pre-dating the Jawaiian reggae movement which became popular in the early 1980s. Kaui released the song as a single in Japan in 1978, through the Nippon Phonogram label.

Brad Kora of the New Zealand band L.A.B. suggested that the band record a cover of the song, inspired by jam sessions the band members held at beaches near their hometown of Whakatāne. Brothers Stuart and Brad Kora felt that the song was an important part of their upbringing, and would often performed the song during jam sessions while they were in the band Kora. The recorded their cover in mid-2021, and incorporated wah-wah pedal guitar into the track.

== Release ==
The song was released as a single by L.A.B. on 26 November 2021, one month before the album L.A.B. V. In June 2022, a live rendition of "Mr Reggae" was released as a part of the Live at Massey Studios extended play. The song was compiled onto the band's 2023 album Introducing L.A.B., originally produced as a sampler for their debut European performances.

== Critical reception ==
Alex Behan of Stuff described L.A.B.'s cover as a "nicely executed" "straightforward slice of wah-guitar wizardry that feels instantly familiar". Tim Gruar of Ambient Light Blog felt the song was a "stock standard dancehall number" that was "pretty much the meat and potatoes for this ban...a little under-whelming and run-of-the-mill".

At the 2022 Aotearoa Music Awards, "Mr Reggae" won the Single of the Year award.

== Credits and personnel ==
- Ara Adams-Tamatea – bass, co-engineer, co-producer, synths
- Miharo Gregory – backing vocals, FX, organ, piano solo
- Billy Kaui – lyrics, songwriting
- Brad Kora – drums, producer
- Stuart Kora – bubble, piano
- L.A.B. – arrangement
- Reiki Ruawai – guest vocals
- Joel Shadbolt – acoustic guitar, backing vocals, vocals

== Charts ==
=== Weekly charts ===
Chart (2021)	Peak position
New Zealand (Recorded Music NZ)	3

=== Year-end charts ===
Chart (2022)	Position
New Zealand (Recorded Music NZ)	12

== Certifications ==
Certifications for "Mr Reggae"
Region	Certification	Certified units/sales
New Zealand (RMNZ)	6× Platinum	180,000^{‡}
^{‡} Sales+streaming figures based on certification alone.
