= L.A.B. (album) =

2017 studio album by L.A.B.

Studio album by L.A.B.
- Released: 24 November 2017
- Genres: Reggae; soul; funk; blues
- Length: 67:03
- Label: Loop Recordings
- Producer: Brad Kora

L.A.B. chronology
L.A.B. (2017)	L.A.B. II (2018)

Singles from L.A.B.
- 1. "Jimmy Boy" Released: 21 September 2017; 2. "Starry Eyes" Released: 12 October 2017; 3. "Ain't No Use" Released: 2 November 2017; 4. "Umulash" Released: 16 November 2017; 5. "Controller" Released: 31 July 2018

L.A.B. is the debut studio album by New Zealand band L.A.B., released on 24 November 2017 by Loop Recordings.

== Production ==
L.A.B. originally formed as a project for Kora members Brad and Stu Kora, in collaboration with Ara Adams-Tamatea of Katchafire and vocalist Joel Shadbolt. The songs recorded on the album were written and performed between 2015 and 2017, and developed based on audience reception.

The album was written in Whakatāne and Tauranga, and recorded in Wellington at Dr. Lee Prebble's home recording studio, Surgery Studios.

== Release and promotion ==
Four tracks were released as singles in the lead-up to the album's release. "Jimmy Boy" was the first, released on 21 September 2017 on the date when the album was announced. This was followed by "Starry Eyes" followed on 12 October, "Ain't No Use" on 2 November and "Umulash" on the 16th.

In March, the album was named as one of five finalists for the Best Debut Record Award at the 2018 Taite Music Prize.

A music video was released for the album's final single "Controller", on 31 July 2018. The song became a hit in 2020 after the release of the band's single "In the Air", becoming the 8th most successful single by a New Zealand artist in 2020.

== Track listing ==
L.A.B. track listing
No.	Title	Writer(s)	Length
1.	"She's Gone"	B. Kora	7:21
2.	"Starry Eyes"	B. Kora; J. Shadbolt	4:18
3.	"Jimmy Boy"	B. Kora	6:15
4.	"Umulash"	L.A.B.; B. Kora; J. Shadbolt	4:28
5.	"The Watchman"	B. Kora; J. Shadbolt	5:11
6.	"Oh-No"	L.A.B.; B. Kora; J. Shadbolt	5:31
7.	"Controller"	B. Kora	4:35
8.	"Ain't No Use"	L.A.B.; B. Kora; J. Shadbolt	4:40
9.	"Love Will Save Me"	A. Adams-Tamatea; S. Kora; B. Kora	5:53
10.	"Sweet Water"	L.A.B.; B. Kora; J. Shadbolt	8:15
11.	"Old Man"	B. Kora; S. Kora; T. Kora; J. Shadbolt	6:43
12.	"Lonely Man"	J. Shadbolt; S. Kora; B. Kora	3:53
Total length:			67:03

== Credits and personnel ==
- A. Adams-Tamatea – arrangement (9), backing vocals (8), bass (1–3, 5, 7–8, 11–12), bass moog voyager (9–10), moog bass (2, 4), songwriting (9)
- B. Kora – arrangement (4, 7, 9, 11–12), backing vocals (1, 4, 6, 8), chorus vocals (9–10), drums (1–12), lyrics (1, 4–10, 12), percussion (2, 5, 8–10), producer, sampling (6–7, 9–10), songwriting (1–3, 5, 7, 9, 11–12), string & percussion arrangement (2), string arrangement (4, 11), timpani (3)
- S. Kora – acoustic guitar (12), B3 organ (8–10), backing vocals (1, 4, 6, 8), guitar (3), keys (1, 3–4, 8–11), organ (6, 11), rhythm guitar (5), songwriting (9, 11–12), synth (2, 4, 6–10)
- T. Kora – songwriting (11), slide guitar (11)
- L.A.B. – arrangement (1–3, 5–6, 8, 10), chants (3), lyrics (3), songwriting (4, 6, 8, 10)
- Dr Lee Prebble – co-producer, sound engineer
- J. Shadbolt – acoustic guitar (5, 12), backing vocals (6), guitar (1, 3–4, 6, 8, 10), lyrics (2, 4–6, 8, 10), songwriting (2, 12), vocals (1–12)
- Leisure Tomlins – vocals (4)

== Charts ==
=== Weekly charts ===
Weekly chart performance for L.A.B.
Chart (2017–2021)	Peak position
New Zealand Albums (RMNZ)	8

=== Year-end charts ===
Year-end chart performance for L.A.B.
Chart (2020)	Position
New Zealand Albums (RMNZ)	26
Chart (2021)	Position
New Zealand Albums (RMNZ)	25
Chart (2022)	Position
New Zealand Albums (RMNZ)	47

== Certifications ==
Certifications for L.A.B.
Region	Certification	Certified units/sales
New Zealand (RMNZ)	3× Platinum	45,000^{‡}
^{‡} Sales+streaming figures based on certification alone.

== Release history ==
Release dates and formats for L.A.B.
Region	Date	Format(s)	Label(s)	Ref.
New Zealand	24 November 2017	CD; vinyl; digital download; streaming	Loop Recordings	
