= L.A.B. IV =

Studio album by L.A.B.
- Released: 18 December 2020
- Recorded: 2020
- Genre: Reggae
- Label: Loop Recordings

L.A.B. chronology
| L.A.B. III (2019) | L.A.B. IV (2020) | L.A.B. V (2021) |

Singles from L.A.B. IV
- 1. "My Brother" Released: 20 November 2020; 2. "Why Oh Why" Released: 4 December 2020; 3. "Yes I Do" Released: 28 July 2021

L.A.B. IV is the fourth studio album by New Zealand band L.A.B. It was released on 18 December 2020 via Loop Recordings. The album debuted at number one in New Zealand and number forty-five in Australia. It features two singles: "My Brother" and "Why Oh Why", which were also charted at number 35 and 1 respectively. "Why Oh Why" became the band's second number-one single after "In the Air" (2019).

== Track listing ==
All tracks are written by Arapekanga Hayden Adams-Tamatea, Brad Donald Kora, Hiriini Stuart Kora, Joel Charles Shadbolt and Miharo Boaz Gregory.

L.A.B. IV track listing
| No. | Title | Length |
|---|---|---|
| 1. | "My Brother" | 3:39 |
| 2. | "Why Oh Why" | 4:50 |
| 3. | "Boy King" | 5:22 |
| 4. | "Yes I Do" | 5:10 |
| 5. | "Never Give Up" | 3:54 |
| 6. | "No Roots" | 4:52 |
| 7. | "IJDK" | 3:44 |
| 8. | "Operator" | 4:28 |
| 9. | "My Baby" | 3:56 |
| 10. | "Early Bird" | 3:59 |
| 11. | "Natural" (acoustic) | 3:43 |
| 12. | "Natural" | 3:40 |

== Charts ==
=== Weekly charts ===
Weekly chart performance for L.A.B. IV
| Chart (2020) | Peak position |
|---|---|
| Australian Albums (ARIA) | 49 |
| New Zealand Albums (RMNZ) | 1 |

=== Year-end charts ===
Year-end chart performance for L.A.B. IV
| Chart (2021) | Position |
|---|---|
| New Zealand Albums (RMNZ) | 6 |
| Chart (2022) | Position |
| New Zealand Albums (RMNZ) | 29 |

== Certifications ==
Certifications for L.A.B. IV
| Region | Certification | Certified units/sales |
|---|---|---|
| New Zealand (RMNZ) | 4× Platinum | 60,000^{‡} |
^{‡} Sales+streaming figures based on certification alone.

== See also ==
- List of number-one albums from the 2020s (New Zealand)
