= L.A.B. II =

Studio album by L.A.B.
- Released: 21 December 2018
- Genres: Reggae; soul; funk; blues
- Length: 54:06
- Label: Loop Recordings
- Producer: Brad Kora

L.A.B. chronology
L.A.B. (2017)	L.A.B. II (2018)	L.A.B. III (2019)

Singles from L.A.B. II
- 1. "Midnight Summer" Released: 7 December 2018; 2. "Free Fall in a Dream" Released: 14 December 2018; 3. "Baby Will You Let Me" Released: 23 May 2019

L.A.B. II is the second studio album by New Zealand band L.A.B., released on 21 December 2018 by Loop Recordings.

== Production ==
The album was recorded at the Surgery Studios in Wellington, New Zealand, the home studio of Dr. Lee Prebble, in the year since the release of their debut album L.A.B. in November 2017. The band lived full-time at Surgery Studios while writing and recording the album.

== Release and promotion ==
The album was announced on 7 December 2018, alongside the release of the album's first single "Midnight Summer". The album's second single, "Free Fall in a Dream", was released the following week on 14 December. L.A.B. toured New Zealand between December 2018 and March 2019, performing at events including Rhythm & Vines, Soundsplash Festival and One Love Festival. In May 2019, the album's final single "Baby Will You Let Me" was released, accompanied by a music video directed by Shae Sterling.

In 2020, the album track "Rocketship" began charting in New Zealand, and was certified platinum later that year.

== Critical reception ==
Due to the release of L.A.B. II, the band were nominated for two awards at the 2019 New Zealand Music Awards: Best Roots Artist and Best Group.

== Track listing ==
L.A.B. II track listing
No.	Title	Writer(s)	Length
1.	"Rocketship"	B. Kora	4:49
2.	"Fashion Dread"	B. Kora; J. Shadbolt	4:40
3.	"I Don't Wanna Know"	L.A.B.; B. Kora	4:22
4.	"See the Light"	B. Kora; S. Kora; J. Shadbolt	4:45
5.	"Hands Up"	B. Kora	3:53
6.	"Love Affair"	B. Kora	4:55
7.	"Free Fall in a Dream"	B. Kora; J. Shadbolt	3:35
8.	"Monica"	J. Shadbolt; B. Kora	4:31
9.	"Midnight Summer"	B. Kora	4:10
10.	"Baby Will You Let Me"	A. Adams-Tamatea; B. Kora; S. Kora	4:39
11.	"Innocence and Love"	A. Adams-Tamatea; B. Kora; S. Kora	3:15
12.	"Bless Me Brother"	B. Kora	6:32
Total length:			54:06

== Credits and personnel ==
- A. Adams-Tamatea – arrangement (10–11), backing vocals (12), bass (1, 5, 7–12), moog bass synthesiser (2–4, 6), songwriting (10–11)
- Miharo Gregory – backing vocals (7), clavinet (10), piano (1)
- Lucien Johnson – saxophone (10)
- B. Kora – acoustic drums (4), arrangement (1, 4, 8, 10–11), backing vocals (2, 7, 12), drum programming (3–4, 6), drums (1–2, 5, 7–12), lyrics (1–3, 5–12), percussion (5), producer, songwriting (1–2, 4–7, 9–12), string arrangement (3)
- Laughton Kora – backing vocals (9)
- S. Kora – arrangement (4, 8, 10–11), backing vocals (5, 12), keys (1, 4–5, 7, 9–10, 12), organ (5, 10), rhythm guitar (1–2, 5, 7, 10–11), songwriting (4, 10–11), synthesiser (2–3, 6, 9, 12)
- L.A.B. – arrangement (2–3, 5–7, 9, 12), songwriting (3)
- Barrett Mocking – trumpet (10)
- Dr Lee Prebble – co-producer
- J. Shadbolt – acoustic guitar (3, 8), arrangement (4, 8), electric guitar (8), lead guitar (1, 5, 7, 10, 12), lead vocals (2–3, 6–12), lead vocoder (2), lyrics (2, 4), rhythm guitar (6, 9), songwriting (4, 7–8), vocals (1, 5)
- Lisa Tomlins – backing vocals (10)

== Charts ==
=== Weekly charts ===
Weekly chart performance for L.A.B. II
Chart (2018)	Peak position
New Zealand Albums (RMNZ)	12

=== Year-end charts ===
Year-end chart performance for L.A.B. II
Chart (2020)	Position
New Zealand Albums (RMNZ)	39
Chart (2021)	Position
New Zealand Albums (RMNZ)	41

== Certifications ==
Certifications for L.A.B. II
Region	Certification	Certified units/sales
New Zealand (RMNZ)	Platinum	15,000^{‡}
^{‡} Sales+streaming figures based on certification alone.

== Release history ==
Release dates and formats for L.A.B. II
Region	Date	Format(s)	Label(s)	Ref.
New Zealand	21 December 2018	CD; vinyl; digital download; streaming	Loop Recordings	
