= L.A.B. III =

Studio album by L.A.B.
- Released: 6 December 2019
- Genres: Reggae; soul; funk; blues
- Length: 41:01
- Label: Loop Recordings
- Producer: Brad Kora

L.A.B. chronology
L.A.B. II (2018)	L.A.B. III (2019)	L.A.B. IV (2020)

Singles from L.A.B. III
- 1. "Personify" Released: 13 September 2019; 2. "In the Air" Released: 22 November 2019

L.A.B. III is the third studio album by New Zealand band L.A.B., released on 6 December 2019 by Loop Recordings. It was promoted by the singles "Personify" and "In the Air", the latter of which was ranked the top-selling single in New Zealand of 2020.

== Production ==
L.A.B. III is the first album to feature Miharo Gregory as a member of the band. The album was recorded in 2019 at Lee Prebble's home studio, the Surgery, in Wellington, where the band would stay while they worked on the album.

== Release and promotion ==
The album's first single "Personify" was released on 13 September 2019, followed by the album's announcement in early November. The album's second single, "In the Air", was released on 22 November. "In the Air" grew in popularity in New Zealand through 2020, reaching number one in March 2020; the first time an independently released single has reached number one in New Zealand since Flight of the Conchords' "Feel Inside (And Stuff Like That)" (2012).

Due to the effects of the COVID-19 pandemic in New Zealand, the band cancelled their Australia/New Zealand tour. After the end of the first round of COVID-19 restrictions, the band performed two wide-scale concerts in July 2020: a sold-out Spark Arena in Auckland, followed by a performance at Hamilton's Claudelands Arena. The band initially announced a performance at the Powerstation in Auckland, however as demand was so high, the concert was relocated to the Auckland Town Hall, and eventually Spark Arena.

A music video was released for the album track "For the Love of Jane" in November 2020. The video featured Paris Evans and Anna Robinson, the two actors who were featured in the band's hit single "In the Air" (2020), as a reprise for their love story. After the release of the video, the song began charting in New Zealand, and was certified platinum in 2021.

== Track listing ==
L.A.B. III track listing
No.	Title	Writer(s)	Length
1.	"Personify"	B. Kora; L.A.B	4:23
2.	"In the Air"	B. Kora; L.A.B	4:13
3.	"All I Know"	B. Kora	4:43
4.	"Alright"	Laughton Kora	3:06
5.	"What the Hell"	B. Kora	3:45
6.	"Running"	B. Kora	3:44
7.	"For the Love of Jane"	B. Kora	4:54
8.	"Shoot on You"	B. Kora; J. Shadbolt; S. Kora	3:25
9.	"Shadows"	B. Kora; L.A.B.	3:44
10.	"Heat"	A. Adams-Tamatea; B. Kora; S. Kora; J. Shadbolt	5:04
Total length:			41:01

== Credits and personnel ==
The album was recorded at the Surgery Studios in Wellington, New Zealand, while strings were recorded at Mmm Studio in Auckland.

- A. Adams-Tamatea – arrangement (1, 5, 9), bass (1–7, 9–10), co-engineer, co-producer, drum programming (5, 9), songwriting (10)
- Mahuia Bridgman-Cooper – string & horn arrangement (7), violin (7)
- Mike Gibson – mastering (at Munki Studios)
- M. Gregory – backing vocals (3–4, 6, 8), keys (2, 4–6, 8–9), piano (1, 3), rhodes (7), synths (1, 3, 10)
- Joe Harrop – viola (7)
- Jessica Hindin – violin (7)
- L.A.B. – arrangement (2–4, 6–8), songwriting (1–2, 9)
- B. Kora – arrangement (1–2, 9–10), backing vocals (3–4, 6, 8), drums (2–10), lyrics (1–3, 5–10), percussion (3), producer, prophet synth (10), songwriting (1, 3, 5–10), string programming (3–4, 10)
- Laughton Kora – arrangement (4), lyrics (4), songwriting (4)
- S. Kora – backing vocals (3–4, 6, 8), bass (8), drums (1), keys (5–6, 8–9), rhythm guitar (1–7, 9–10), songwriting (8, 10), synths (3)
- Lewis McCallum – horns (7)
- Dr Lee Prebble – co-producer, head engineer, M520 synth (10)
- J. Shadbolt – guitars (8), lead guitar (1–3, 5–7, 9–10), lead vocals (1–10), songwriting (8, 10)
- Lisa Tomlins – backing vocals (2)
- Rachel Wells – cello (7)

== Charts ==
=== Weekly charts ===
Weekly chart performance for L.A.B. III
Chart (2019)	Peak position
New Zealand Albums (RMNZ)	5

=== Year-end charts ===
Year-end chart performance for L.A.B. III
Chart (2020)	Position
New Zealand Albums (RMNZ)	7
Chart (2021)	Position
New Zealand Albums (RMNZ)	17
Chart (2022)	Position
New Zealand Albums (RMNZ)	39

== Certifications ==
Certifications for L.A.B. III
Region	Certification	Certified units/sales
New Zealand (RMNZ)	5× Platinum	75,000^{‡}
^{‡} Sales+streaming figures based on certification alone.

== Release history ==
Release dates and formats for L.A.B. III
Region	Date	Format(s)	Label(s)	Ref.
New Zealand	6 December 2019	CD; vinyl; digital download; streaming	Loop Recordings	
