= L.A.B. V =

Studio album by L.A.B.
- Released: 17 December 2021
- Genres: Reggae; soul; funk; blues; hip-hop; country
- Length: 48:39
- Label: Loop Recordings
- Producer: Brad Kora

L.A.B. chronology
L.A.B. IV (2020)	L.A.B. V (2021)	L.A.B in Dub (2022)

Singles from L.A.B. V
- 1. "Mr Reggae" Released: 26 November 2021; 2. "Under the Sun" Released: 17 December 2021; 3. "Real Ones" Released: 1 April 2022

L.A.B. V is the fifth studio album by New Zealand band L.A.B., released on 17 December 2021 by Loop Recordings. Featuring the singles "Mr Reggae" and "Under the Sun", the album was a commercial and critical success, reaching number one on the New Zealand Albums Chart, and winning the Aotearoa Music Award for Album of the Year.

== Production ==
The album was written and recorded over a period of six months in mid-2021, at Dr. Lee Prebble's Surgery Studios in Wellington.

== Release and promotion ==
The album's first single "Mr Reggae", a cover of the 1977 song by Hawaiian musician Billy Kaui, was released on 26 November 2021. This was followed by "Under the Sun", which was released as the album's second single on the day the album was released, on 17 December. The album's third single was "Real Ones", a hip-hop song performed with New Zealand musician Kings, which was released a week before the album's vinyl release on 1 April 2022.

The band performed at Rhythm & Alps on 30 December, followed by three large-scale concerts in January, held in New Plymouth, Christchurch and Western Springs in Auckland. The group's concert at Western Springs made them the second New Zealand band in history to headline the venue, after Six60. In March and April 2022, the band toured Australia, performing seven dates, including an appearance at the Byron Bay Bluesfest on 15 April.

== Reception ==
In November 2022, the album was awarded the Aotearoa Music Award for Album of the Year. This was the second consecutive year where L.A.B. won this award, after L.A.B. IV in 2021.

== Track listing ==
L.A.B. V track listing
No.	Title	Writer(s)	Length
1.	"Can You Be the One"	B Kora	3:23
2.	"All Night"	L.A.B	3:01
3.	"Mr Reggae"	Billy Kaui	3:04
4.	"Under the Sun"	B Kora	4:52
5.	"Real Ones" (with Kings)	Kings	3:58
6.	"Oh Honey"	B Kora	4:05
7.	"Like Fire"	B Kora	3:40
8.	"Backseat"	B Kora; L.A.B	5:10
9.	"I Know"	B Kora	3:17
10.	"Proud Man"	B Kora	5:09
Total length:			48:39

== Credits and personnel ==
In addition to L.A.B., strings on the album were performed by The Black Quartet, a group featuring Mahuia Bridgman-Cooper, Peau Halapua and Joe Harrop. The album was recorded at the Surgery Studios in Wellington, New Zealand, while strings were recorded at Mmm Studio in Auckland.

- A Adams-Tamatea – bass (1–4, 6–10), co-engineer, co-producer, moog bass (5), MPC (7), synths (3, 7)
- The Black Quartet – strings (1–2, 5–6, 8)
- Mahuia Bridgman-Cooper – string arrangement (1, 5–6, 8), string, flute & horn arrangement (2)
- Mike Gibson – mastering (at Munki Studios)
- M Gregory – backing vocals (1, 3, 6–9), FX (3, 9), glockenspiel (1, 6), harpsichord (9), keyboards (1, 8, 10), organ (3–4, 7, 9), piano (2, 4–6), piano solo (3), rhodes (6), synths (7, 10), vocals (2)
- Jack Harre – trumpet (9–10)
- Billy Kaui – lyrics, songwriting (3)
- Kings – arrangement (5), drum programming (5), lyrics (5), rap (5), songwriting (5)
- B Kora – arrangement (6), backing vocals (1, 6–9), drums (1–4, 6–10), glockenspiel (6), lyrics (1, 4, 6–10), moog (2), percussion (1–4, 6, 8–10), producer, songwriting (1, 4, 6–7, 9–10), vocals (2)
- S Kora – acoustic guitar (1–2, 4), bubble (3, 9), clavinet (2, 9), backing vocals (1), electric guitar (6, 9–10), keys strings (6), organ (10), piano (3, 9), synths (5, 7), vocals (2)
- L.A.B. – arrangement (1–5, 7–10), lyrics (2), songwriting (2, 8)
- Natalie Mentor – artwork
- Dr Lee Prebble – co-producer, head engineer
- Reiki Ruawai – guest vocals (3)
- J Shadbolt – acoustic guitar (1, 3, 8), backing vocals (1, 3–4, 6–10), electric guitar (1–4, 6–10), laps teel guitar (4), lead vocals (1, 4, 6–10), vocals (2–3, 5)
- Bryn Van Vliet – saxophone (9–10)
- Kaito Walley – trombone (9–10)
- Louisa Williamson – flute (8), saxophone (8, 10)

== Charts ==
=== Weekly charts ===
Weekly chart performance for L.A.B. V
Chart	Peak position
New Zealand Albums (RMNZ)	1

=== Year-end charts ===
Year-end chart performance for L.A.B. V
Chart (2022)	Position
New Zealand Albums (RMNZ)	18

== Certifications ==
Certifications for L.A.B. V
Region	Certification	Certified units/sales
New Zealand (RMNZ)	Platinum	15,000^{‡}
^{‡} Sales+streaming figures based on certification alone.

== Release history ==
Release dates and formats for L.A.B. V
Region	Date	Format(s)	Label(s)	Ref.
New Zealand	17 December 2021	CD; digital download; streaming	Loop Recordings	
Various	8 April 2022	Vinyl	Loop Recordings	
