= In the Air (L.A.B. song) =

2019 single by L.A.B.

Single by L.A.B.

from the album L.A.B. III
- Released: 22 November 2019
- Genre: pop, reggae
- Length: 4:13
- Label: Loop Recordings Aot(ear)oa
- Songwriters: Brad Kora, L.A.B
- Producer: Brad Kora

L.A.B. singles chronology
"Personify" (2019)	"In the Air" (2019)	"My Brother" (2020)

Music video
- "In the Air" on YouTube

"In the Air" is a song by New Zealand band L.A.B., released as a single from their album L.A.B. III in November 2019. The song topped the charts in New Zealand, becoming the most successful single of 2020 in the country.

== Composition ==
"In the Air" was recorded in 2019 in Wellington, at the home studio of musician Lee Prebble. The band collaborative wrote "In the Air", with member Brad Kora providing the song's lyrics. The song is a melodic pop song, featuring smooth guitars and guest vocals by New Zealand singer Lisa Tomlins.

== Release ==
"In the Air" was released as a single on 22 November 2019, a week before their album L.A.B. III. "In the Air" grew in popularity in New Zealand through 2020, reaching number one in March 2020; it was the first time an independently released single reached number one in New Zealand since Flight of the Conchords' "Feel Inside (And Stuff Like That)" (2012). The song became the best-selling single of 2020 in New Zealand.

A remix EP was released for the song in May 2020, which includes remixes by musicians including Dub FX, whom the band met while touring with Fat Freddy’s Drop in summer 2019/2020, and Tiki Taane, a long-time friend of the bandmembers. The song was compiled onto the band's 2023 album Introducing L.A.B., originally produced as a sampler for their debut European performances.

== Critical reception ==
Matthew McAuley of The Spinoff described "In the Air" as "perfectly pitched summer song...sea-scented, very-lightly reggae-tinged groover", likening it to local acts such as the Black Seeds and Breaks Co-Op, as well as the Doobie Brothers' "What a Fool Believes" (1979). At the 2020 Aotearoa Music Awards, the song was nominated for the Aotearoa Music Award for Single of the Year, losing to "Supalonely" by Benee.

== Track listing ==
Digital download and streaming

1. "In the Air" – 4:12
2. "In the Air" (Dub FX remix) – 3:42
3. "In the Air" (Tiki Taane in the Dub remix) – 4:10
4. "In the Air" (Scott Tindale remix) – 5:11
5. "In the Air" (Magik J remix) – 5:33

== Credits and personnel ==
- Ara Adams-Tamatea – bass
- Miharo Gregory – keys
- L.A.B. – arrangement, songwriting
- Brad Kora – arrangement, drums, lyrics, producer
- Stuart Kora – rhythm guitar
- Joel Shadbolt – lead guitar, lead vocals
- Lisa Tomlins – backing vocals

== Charts ==
=== Weekly charts ===
Weekly chart performance for "In the Air"
Chart (2020)	Peak position
New Zealand (Recorded Music NZ)	1

=== Year-end charts ===
Year-end chart performance for "In the Air"
Chart	Year	Position
New Zealand (Recorded Music NZ)	2020	1
New Zealand (Recorded Music NZ)	2021	6
New Zealand (Recorded Music NZ)	2022	6
New Zealand (Recorded Music NZ)	2023	15

== Certifications ==
Certifications for "In the Air"
Region	Certification	Certified units/sales
Australia (ARIA)	Gold	35,000^{‡}
New Zealand (RMNZ)	16× Platinum	480,000^{‡}
^{‡} Sales+streaming figures based on certification alone.
