= L.A.B. =

Reggae band

- Origin: Whakatāne, Bay of Plenty, New Zealand
- Genres: Reggae; Funk; Rock; electronic
- Label: Loop
- Members: Brad Kora; Stuart Kora; Joel Shadbolt; Ara Adams-Tamatea; Miharo Gregory
- Website: loop.co.nz/artists/lab

L.A.B. is a New Zealand reggae band formed in Whakatāne, Bay of Plenty in 2016. Its founding members are Brad Kora (backing vocals and drums) and Stuart Kora (backing vocals, keyboard and guitar) of the band Kora. They soon engaged Joel Shadbolt on lead vocals and guitar, Ara Adams-Tamatea, formerly of Katchafire, as bassist, and Miharo Gregory as keyboardist. The band mostly composes reggae music, with a mix of electronic, blues, rock and funk music.

Their song "In the Air" topped the New Zealand Singles Chart in March 2020. At the end of the year, it was ranked as New Zealand's best-performing single of 2020. It stayed in the top 10 for 73 weeks, longer than any other single, and at 15× platinum is New Zealand's all-time best-selling single. "Why Oh Why" also topped the New Zealand chart in December 2020. By mid-2021, "Why Oh Why" had gained popularity at Island Reggae radio stations across Hawaii.

In July 2020, the band announced their first summer show date for January 2021 with The Black Seeds, Mako Road, Bailey Wiley and Anna Coddington in support.

L.A.B. III and L.A.B. IV were finalists in the 2020 and 2021 Taite Music Prize respectively.

== Discography ==
=== Studio albums ===
List of studio albums, with selected chart positions and certifications
Title	Album details	Peak chart positions		Certifications
Title	Album details	NZ	AUS	Certifications
L.A.B.	Released: 24 November 2017; Label: Loop Recordings; Formats: CD, LP, digital download, streaming	8	—	RMNZ: 4× Platinum
L.A.B. II	Released: 21 December 2018; Label: Loop Recordings; Formats: CD, LP, digital download, streaming	12	—	RMNZ: 2× Platinum
L.A.B. III	Released: 6 December 2019; Label: Loop Recordings; Formats: CD, LP, digital download, streaming	5	—	RMNZ: 5× Platinum
L.A.B. IV	Released: 18 December 2020; Label: Loop Recordings; Formats: CD, LP, digital download, streaming	1	49	RMNZ: 4× Platinum
L.A.B. V	Released: 17 December 2021; Label: Loop Recordings; Formats: CD, LP, digital download, streaming	1	— (Note: L.A.B. V did not enter the ARIA Albums Chart, but peaked at number eight on the ARIA Digital Albums Chart.)	RMNZ: 2× Platinum
L.A.B. VI	Released: 23 February 2024; Label: Loop Recordings	1	—	RMNZ: Platinum
"—" denotes a recording that did not chart or was not released in that region

=== Compilation albums ===
List of compilation albums, with selected chart positions
Title	Album details	Peak chart positions	Certifications
Title	Album details	NZ	Certifications
Introducing L.A.B.	Released: 13 October 2023; Label: Loop Recordings; Formats: LP, digital download, streaming	1	RMNZ: Platinum

=== Remix albums ===
List of remix albums, with selected chart positions
Title	Album details	Peak chart positions
Title	Album details	NZ
L.A.B in Dub (with Paolo Baldini DubFiles)	Released: 21 October 2022; Label: Loop Recordings; Formats: Digital download, streaming	25

=== Singles ===
List of singles, with selected chart positions and certifications, showing year released and album name
Title	Year	Peak chart positions	Certifications	Album
Title	Year	NZ	Certifications	Album
"Jimmy Boy"	2017	—	RMNZ: Platinum	L.A.B.
"Starry Eyes"	2017	—	RMNZ: 2× Platinum	L.A.B.
"Ain't No Use"	2017	—	RMNZ: 2× Platinum	L.A.B.
"Umulash"	2017	—	RMNZ: Gold	L.A.B.
"Controller"	2018	3	RMNZ: 10× Platinum	L.A.B.
"Midnight Summer"	2018	— (Note: "Midnight Summer" did not enter the NZ Top 40 Singles Chart, but peaked at number 23 on the NZ Hot Singles Chart.)	RMNZ: Gold	L.A.B. II
"Free Fall in a Dream"	2018	— (Note: "Free Fall in a Dream" did not enter the NZ Top 40 Singles Chart, but peaked at number 15 on the NZ Artist Hot Singles Chart.)		L.A.B. II
"Baby Will You Let Me"	2019	—	RMNZ: Platinum	L.A.B. II
"Personify"	2019	— (Note: "Personify" did not enter the NZ Top 40 Singles Chart, but peaked at number 18 on the NZ Hot Singles Chart.)	RMNZ: Platinum	L.A.B. III
"In the Air"	2019	1	ARIA: Gold; RMNZ: 16× Platinum	L.A.B. III
"My Brother"	2020	35	RMNZ: Platinum	L.A.B. IV
"Why Oh Why"	2020	1	RMNZ: 8× Platinum	L.A.B. IV
"Yes I Do"	2021	13	RMNZ: 4× Platinum	L.A.B. IV
"Mr Reggae"	2021	3	RMNZ: 6× Platinum	L.A.B. V
"Under the Sun"	2021	12	RMNZ: 3× Platinum	L.A.B. V
"Real Ones" (with Kings)	2022	— (Note: "Real Ones" did not enter the NZ Top 40 Singles Chart, but peaked at number 11 on the NZ Hot Singles Chart.)		L.A.B. V
"Take It Away"	2022	13	RMNZ: 4× Platinum	L.A.B. VI
"Casanova"	2023	30	RMNZ: 2× Platinum	L.A.B. VI
"Oh No (Pt. 2)"	2023	— (Note: "Oh No (Pt. 2)" did not enter the NZ Top 40 Singles Chart, but peaked at number one on the NZ Hot Singles Chart.)	RMNZ: Gold	L.A.B. VI
"Ocean Demon"	2024	— (Note: "Ocean Demon" did not enter the NZ Top 40 Singles Chart, but peaked at number four on the NZ Hot Singles Chart.)	RMNZ: Gold	L.A.B. VI
"Follow"	2024	— (Note: "Follow" did not enter the NZ Top 40 Singles Chart, but peaked at number nine on the NZ Hot Singles Chart.)		TBA
"We Belong" (with Corrella)	2025	—		Te Matatini 2025
"—" denotes a recording that did not chart or was not released in that region

=== Other charted and certified songs ===
List of songs, with selected chart positions and certifications, showing year released and album name
Title	Year	Peak chart positions	Certifications	Album
Title	Year	NZ	Certifications	Album
"The Watchman"	2017	—	RMNZ: Gold	L.A.B.
"Love Will Save Me"	2017	—	RMNZ: Gold	L.A.B.
"Oh No"	2017	—	RMNZ: Gold	L.A.B.
"She's Gone"	2017	—	RMNZ: Platinum	L.A.B.
"Rocketship"	2018	— (Note: "Rocketship" did not enter the NZ Top 40 Singles Chart, but peaked at number 14 on the NZ Artist Top 20.)	RMNZ: 3× Platinum	L.A.B. II
"Fashion Dread"	2018	— (Note: "Fashion Dread" did not enter the NZ Top 40 Singles Chart, but peaked at number 23 on the NZ Hot Singles Chart.)	RMNZ: Gold	L.A.B. II
"Hands Up"	2018	— (Note: "Hands Up" did not enter the NZ Top 40 Singles Chart, but peaked at number 32 on the NZ Hot Singles Chart.)	RMNZ: Gold	L.A.B. II
"I Don't Wanna Know"	2018	— (Note: "I Don't Wanna Know" did not enter the NZ Top 40 Singles Chart, but peaked at number 33 on the NZ Hot Singles Chart.)	RMNZ: Gold	L.A.B. II
"All I Know'	2019	—	RMNZ: Gold	L.A.B. III
"For the Love of Jane"	2019	— (Note: "For the Love of Jane" did not enter the NZ Top 40 Singles Chart, but peaked at number 15 on the NZ Artist Top 20.)	RMNZ: 3× Platinum	L.A.B. III
"Shadows"	2019	— (Note: "Shadows" did not enter the NZ Top 40 Singles Chart, but peaked at number 12 on the NZ Hot Singles Chart.)	RMNZ: 2× Platinum	L.A.B. III
"Running"	2019	— (Note: "Running" did not enter the NZ Top 40 Singles Chart, but peaked at number 16 on the NZ Hot Singles Chart.)	RMNZ: Platinum	L.A.B. III
"Shoot on You"	2019	— (Note: "Shoot on You" did not enter the NZ Top 40 Singles Chart, but peaked at number 12 on the NZ Artist Hot Singles Chart.)	RMNZ: Gold	L.A.B. III
"Alright"	2019	—	RMNZ: Gold	L.A.B. III
"What the Hell"	2019	—	RMNZ: Gold	L.A.B. III
"Natural"	2020	5	RMNZ: 2× Platinum	L.A.B. IV
"No Roots"	2020	6	RMNZ: 2× Platinum	L.A.B. IV
"Boy King"	2020	— (Note: "Boy King" did not enter the NZ Top 40 Singles Chart, but peaked at number four on the NZ Hot Singles Chart.)	RMNZ: Gold	L.A.B. IV
"My Baby"	2020	—	RMNZ: Platinum	L.A.B. IV
"Can You Be the One"	2021	— (Note: "Can You Be the One" did not enter the NZ Top 40 Singles Chart, but peaked at number eight on the NZ Artist Top 20.)	RMNZ: Gold	L.A.B. V
"Oh Honey"	2021	— (Note: "Oh Honey" did not enter the NZ Top 40 Singles Chart, but peaked at number 10 on the NZ Artist Top 20.)	RMNZ: Gold	L.A.B. V
"Give Me That Feeling"	2024	— (Note: "Give Me That Feeling" did not enter the NZ Top 40 Singles Chart, but peaked at number two on the NZ Hot Singles Chart.)	RMNZ: Gold	L.A.B. VI
"Follow"	2024	— (Note: "Follow" did not enter the NZ Top 40 Singles Chart, but peaked at number eight on the NZ Hot Singles Chart.)		L.A.B. VI
"Crazy Dream"	2024	— (Note: "Crazy Dream" did not enter the NZ Top 40 Singles Chart, but peaked at number 10 on the NZ Hot Singles Chart.)		L.A.B. VI
"Mr Rave Rider"	2024	— (Note: "Mr Rave Rider" did not enter the NZ Top 40 Singles Chart, but peaked at number nine on the NZ Hot Singles Chart.)		L.A.B. VI
"—" a recording single that did not chart or was not released in that region
