= 2009 New Zealand Music Awards =

Annual New Zealand music awards ceremony

- Awarded for: Excellence in New Zealand music
- Sponsored by: Vodafone
- Date: 8 October 2009
- Location: Vector Arena, Auckland
- Country: New Zealand
- Hosted by: Dai Henwood
- Reward: Tui award trophy
- Website: http://www.nzmusicawards.co.nz

Television/radio coverage
- Network: C4

The 2009 New Zealand Music Awards was the 43rd holding of the annual ceremony featuring awards for musical artists based in or originating from New Zealand. Finalists for the three technical awards were announced on 6 August 2009, with winners announced on 2 September at the Langham Hotel. Finalists for 14 'non-technical' categories were also revealed the same night. Five 'non-technical' awards were presented without a group of finalists being selected. The awards ceremony took place on 8 October 2009 at Vector Arena, Auckland. Broadcast live on television by C4, the ceremony was hosted by comedian Dai Henwood.

Ladyhawke won six awards, including Album and Single of the Year. This was the most awards won at a ceremony since 2004, when Scribe also won six. The People's Choice Award was won by Smashproof, who also claimed the award for the highest selling New Zealand Single. Fat Freddy's Drop were nominated in seven categories, including all three technical categories, and gained the Best Aotearoa Roots Album award. Midnight Youth were finalists in seven categories, and secured awards for Best Group, Best Rock Album and Best Engineer. The highest selling New Zealand Album was The Best: '98-'08, a greatest hits album by rock group The Feelers, while Tiki Taane's "Always on My Mind" achieved the Radio Airplay Record of the Year award. Ray Columbus & the Invaders were awarded the Legacy Award at the announcement of technical award winners, and were inducted into the New Zealand Music Hall of Fame.

== Nominees and winners ==
Winners are listed first and highlighted in boldface.

Key
† – Non-technical award
‡ – Technical award

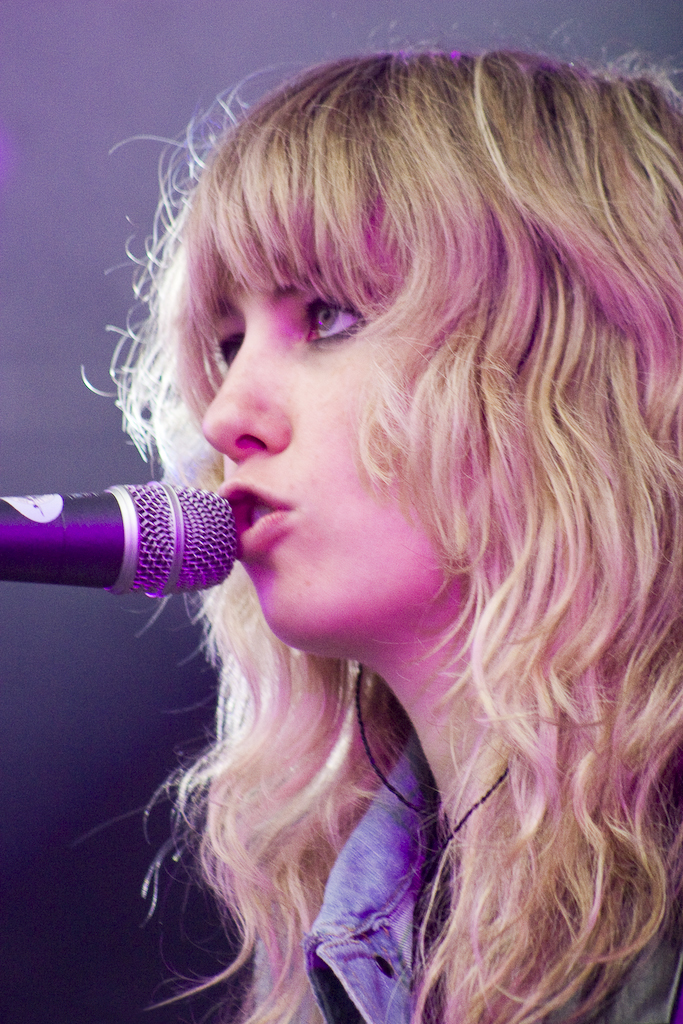
Ladyhawke won five awards for which she was nominated, as well as the International Achievement Award.

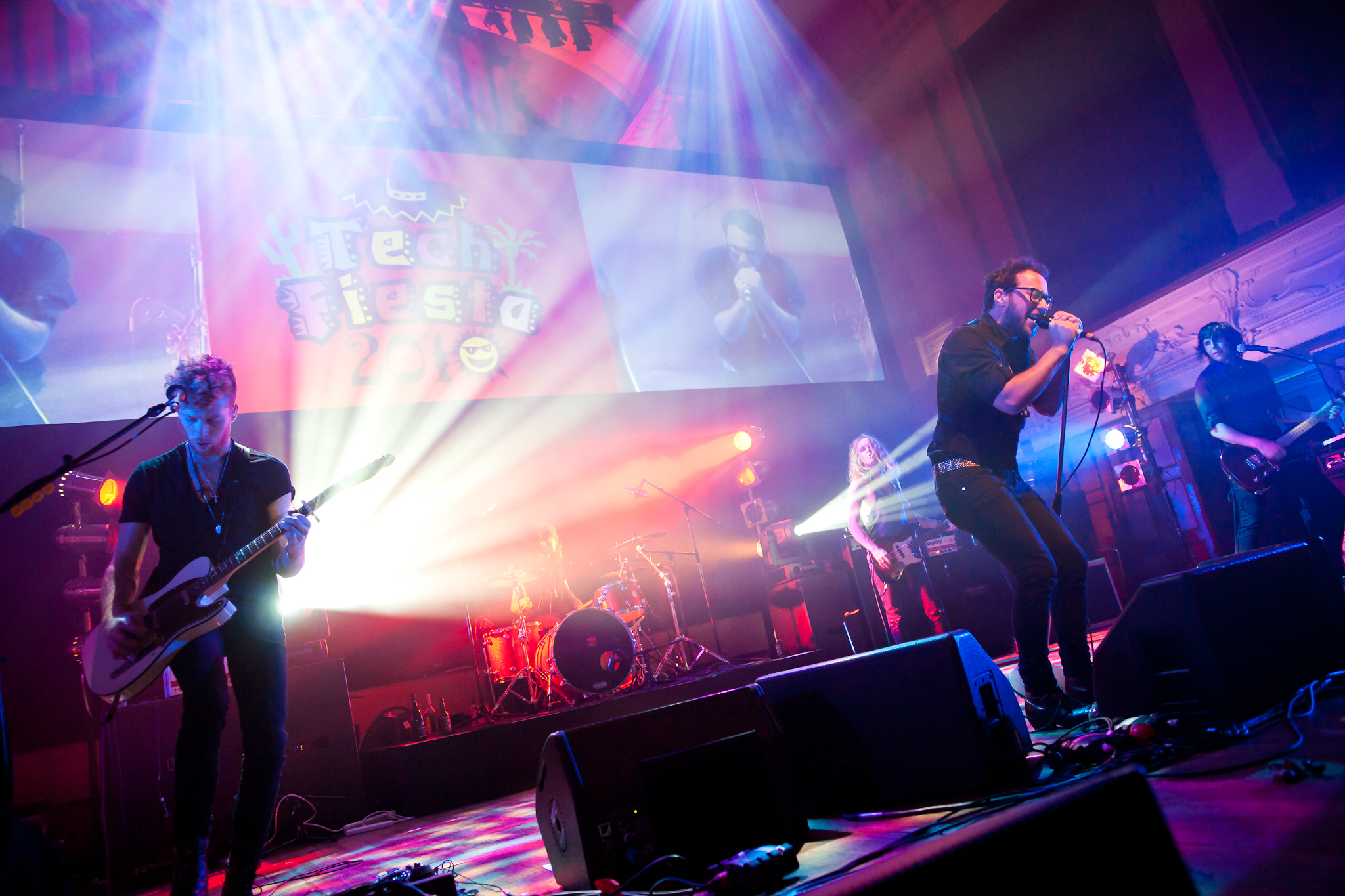
Midnight Youth were awarded the title of Best Group, and their album, The Brave Don't Run, won Best Rock Album.

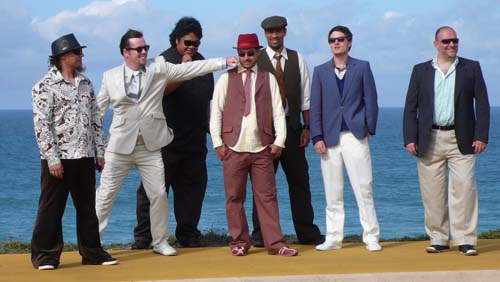
Dr Boondigga and the Big BW, the second studio album by Fat Freddy's Drop, received nominations in all three technical categories, and also won the award for Best Aotearoa Roots Album.

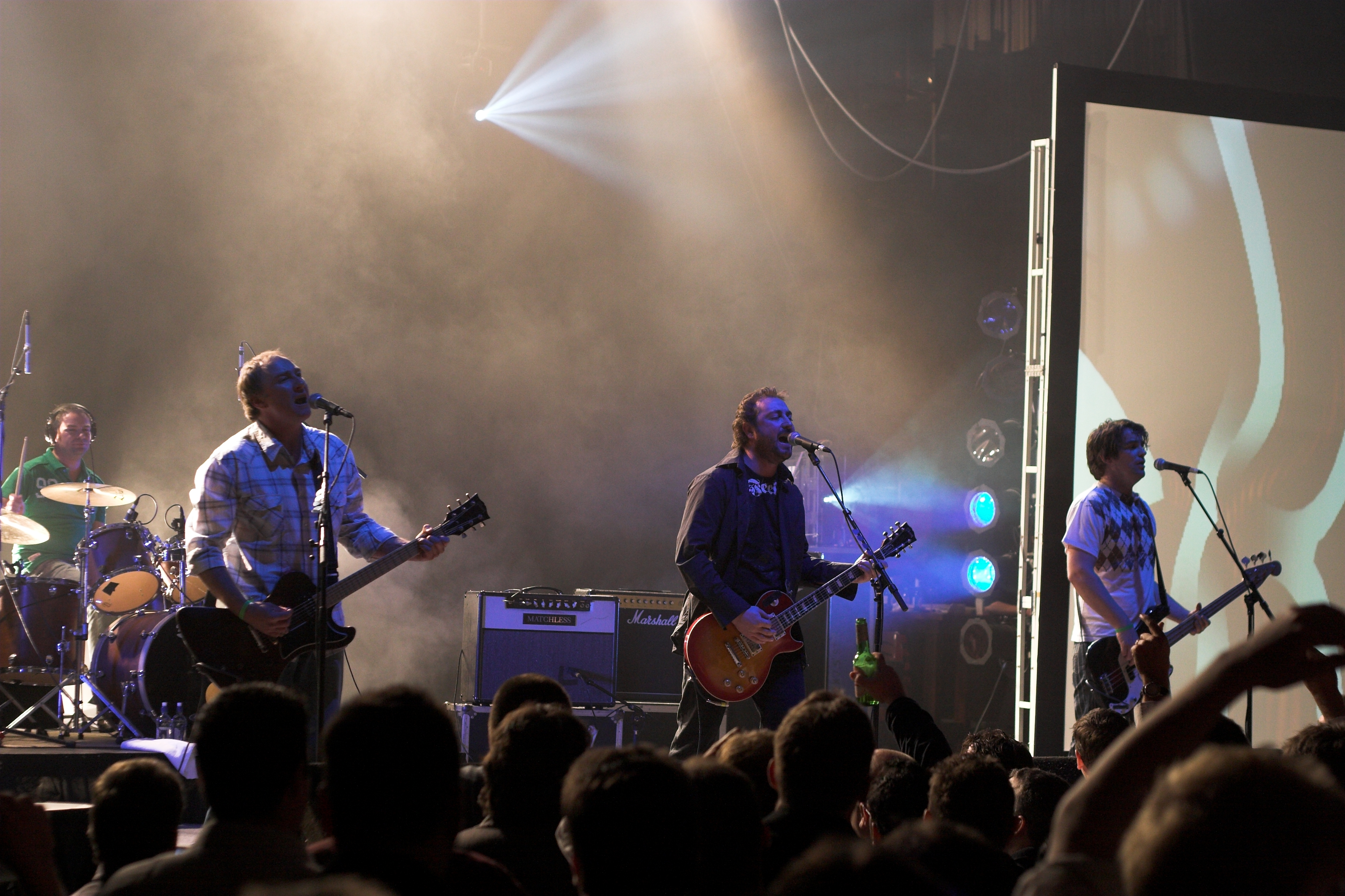
The Feelers' The Best: '98-'08 was the highest selling album of 2009, shipping over 30,000 units.

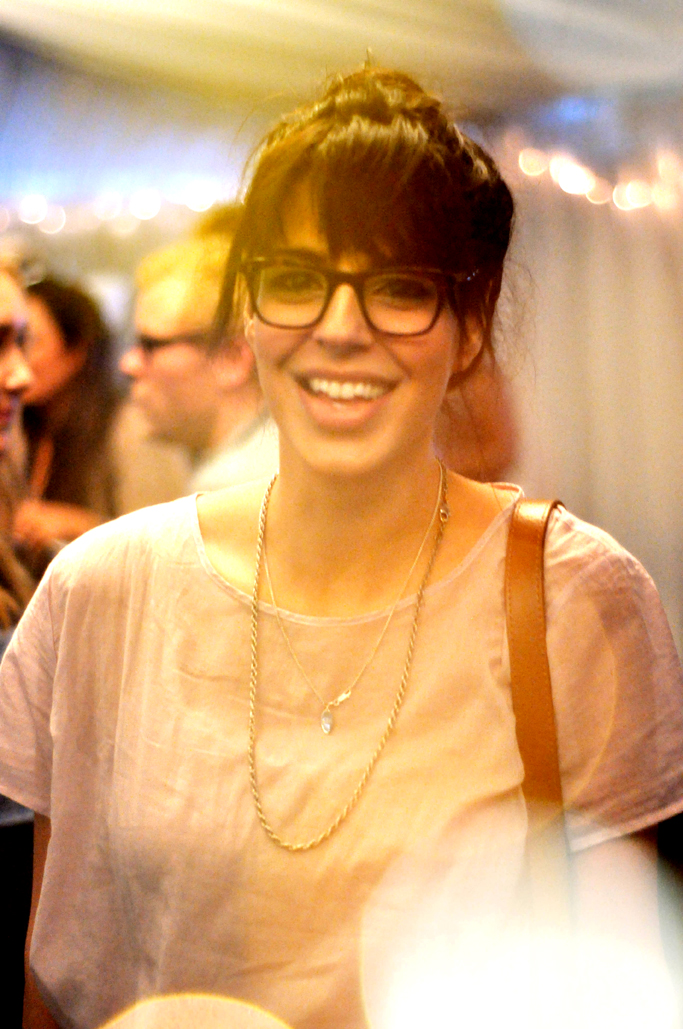
Brooke Fraser won the International Achievement Award, sharing the prize with Ladyhawke.

Album of the Year	Single of the Year
Sponsored by Vodafone: **Ladyhawke – Ladyhawke**; The Mint Chicks – Screens; Midnight Youth – The Brave Don't Run; Cut Off Your Hands – You and I; Fat Freddy's Drop – Dr Boondigga and the Big BW	Sponsored by Vodafone: **Ladyhawke – My Delirium"**; Midnight Youth – "All on Our Own"; P-Money featuring Vince Harder – "Everything"; Smashproof featuring Gin Wigmore – "Brother"; Kids of 88 – "My House"
Best Group†	Breakthrough Artist of the Year†
Sponsored by Steinlager Pure: **Midnight Youth**; Fat Freddy's Drop; The Mint Chicks	Sponsored by Pacific Blue Airlines: **Ladyhawke**; Midnight Youth; Smashproof
Best Male Solo Artist†	Best Female Solo Artist†
**Savage**; Dave Dobbyn; Don McGlashan and The Seven Sisters	Sponsored by Mazda: **Ladyhawke**; Boh Runga; Ladi 6
Peoples' Choice Award†	Best Rock Album†
Sponsored by Vodafone: **Smashproof**; Fat Freddy's Drop; Ladyhawke; Midnight Youth; The Black Seeds	Sponsored by PPNZ: **Midnight Youth – The Brave Don't Run**; The Mint Chicks – Screens; Cut Off Your Hands – You and I
Best Urban / Hip Hop Album†	Best Aotearoa Roots Album†
Sponsored by 42 Below: **Ladi 6 – Time Is Not Much**; Smashproof – The Weekend; Savage – Savage Island	Sponsored by Kiwi FM: **Fat Freddy's Drop – Dr Boondigga and the Big BW**; The Black Seeds – Solid Ground; The Woolshed Sessions – The Woolshed Sessions
Best Music Video†	Best Dance/Electronica Album†
Sponsored by C4: **Chris Graham – "Brother" (Smashproof)**; Sam Peacocke – "I Can't Stop Being Foolish" (The Mint Chicks); Tim van Dammen – "Turn Around" (Sola Rosa featuring Lamkum)	**Ladyhawke – Ladyhawke**; Antiform – City in Exile; Sola Rosa – Get It Together
Best Gospel / Christian Album†	Best Classical Album†
**Mumsdollar – Ruins**; Parachute Band – Technicolour; The Ember Days – EP; Primalband – Your Way	**David Bremner – Gung Ho**; Gareth Farr – Gareth Farr: Tangaroa; New Zealand Chamber Soloists – Ahi
Highest selling New Zealand Single†	Highest selling New Zealand Album†
No finalists were announced in this category.: **Smashproof featuring Gin Wigmore – "Brother"**; At the time of the awards, "Brother" had been certified double platinum, equal to over 30,000 sales.	No finalists were announced in this category.: **The Feelers – The Best: '98-'08**; At the time of the awards, The Best: '98–'08 had been certified double platinum, equal to over 30,000 shipments.
Radio Airplay Record of the Year†	International Achievement Award†
No finalists were announced in this category. Sponsored by New Zealand On Air: **Tiki Taane – "Always on My Mind"**	No finalists were announced in this category.: **Ladyhawke** and **Brooke Fraser**
Legacy Award†	Best Album Cover‡
No finalists were announced in this category. Sponsored by The New Zealand Herald: **Ray Columbus & the Invaders**	**Ruban Nielson – Screens (The Mint Chicks)**; Otis Frizzell – Dr Boondigga and the Big BW (Fat Freddy's Drop); Sam Young – The Brave Don't Run (Midnight Youth)
Best Engineer‡	Best Producer‡
Sponsored by the Music and Audio Institute of New Zealand (MAINZ): **Andrew Buckton – The Brave Don't Run (Midnight Youth)**; Chris Faiumu – Dr Boondigga and the Big BW (Fat Freddy's Drop); Lee Prebble – When the Fever Takes Hold (Spartacus R)	Sponsored by the Music and Audio Institute of New Zealand (MAINZ): **Andrew Spraggon – Get it Together (Sola Rosa)**; Don McGlashan and Sean Donnelly – Marvellous Year (Don McGlashan and The Seven Sisters); Fat Freddy's Drop – Dr Boondigga and the Big BW (Fat Freddy's Drop)

== Performers ==
Performers at the ceremony:

- Ladyhawke gave her number "My Delirium".
- Smashproof and Gin Wigmore sang their top selling single "Brother".
- Midnight Youth performed their tune "All on Our Own".
- "Turn Around" was sung by Sola Rosa and Iva Lamkum.
- The Mint Chicks performed a cover of "She's a Mod", originally by Ray Columbus & the Invaders, who received the Legacy Award.
- John Rowles sang "How Great Thou Art" as a tribute to the late Sir Howard Morrison.
