= Black Sheep (Gin Wigmore song) =

Single by Gin Wigmore

from the album Gravel & Wine
- Released: 26 September 2011
- Genre: Country rock, Southern rock, hard rock
- Length: 3:03
- Label: Universal
- Songwriters: V Butler, Butch Walker

Gin Wigmore singles chronology
"Too Late For Lovers" (2010)	"Black Sheep" (2011)	"Man Like That" (2011)

"Black Sheep" is a song by Gin Wigmore from her album Gravel & Wine. It was released as a single on 26 September 2011.

== Charts ==
Chart (2012)	Peak position
New Zealand Top 40	13
Swiss Singles Top 75	62

== Music video ==
A music video for "Black Sheep" was released on 12 October 2011.

== Use in other media ==
The song appeared in episode 12, season 8 of television series Grey's Anatomy, in episode 2, season 2 of Teen Wolf, and in episode 5, season 5 of The Good Wife, and she appeared singing it on Gift of Revenge, a segment of ABC's television show Revenge in season 2, episode 7. Wigmore performed the song on a season 10 episode of The Ellen DeGeneres Show. A snippet of the song was used for the trailer of the movie The Other Woman. The song was also used in a trailer for season 2 of Orange Is the New Black. The song was used in a 2017 commercial for the Nissan Rogue.

It was also used in the 2018 video game Far Cry 5.
