= Golden Love =

Single by Midnight Youth

from the album The Brave Don't Run
- Released: 14 December 2009
- Length: 4:01
- Label: Warner Music NZ
- Songwriters: Aidan Bartlett, Nick Campbell, Simon Oscroft, Jeremy Redmore, Matt Warman.

Midnight Youth singles chronology
"Cavalry" (2009)	"Golden Love" (2009)

"Golden Love" is the fifth single from New Zealand band Midnight Youth's debut album, The Brave Don't Run.

The song was featured on the season finale of US drama One Tree Hill in mid-2010. It was later played on the South Korean TV series Uncontrollably Fond in 2016.

== Background ==
Jeremy Redmore, the lead singer of Midnight Youth, originally wrote and recorded "Golden Love" as a Christmas present for members of his family. The following year the band re-recorded the song for their album.
