= The Letter (Midnight Youth song) =

Single by Midnight Youth

from the album The Brave Don't Run
- Released: October 2008
- Genre: Rock
- Length: 3:34
- Label: Warner
- Songwriters: Aidan Bartlett, Nick Campbell, Simon Oscroft, Jeremy Redmore, Matt Warman.

Midnight Youth singles chronology
"A New Day" (2007)	"The Letter" (2008)	"All On Our Own" (2009)

Alternative cover

The Letter is the first single from New Zealand band Midnight Youth's debut album, The Brave Don't Run. The song debuted on the New Zealand Top 40 Singles Chart at 34th place, and peaked at 20th place.

The song was one of five finalists for an APRA SIlver Scroll in 2009 and sold gold, more than 7,500 copies, in New Zealand.

Chart (2009)	Peak position
New Zealand Singles Chart	20
