= New Zealand top 50 albums of 2011 =

This is a list of the top-selling albums in New Zealand for 2011 from the Official New Zealand Music Chart's end-of-year chart, compiled by Recorded Music NZ.

== Chart ==
Key
‡ – Album of New Zealand origin

Rank	Artist	Title
1	Adele	21
2	Bruno Mars	Doo-Wops & Hooligans
3	Michael Bublé	Christmas
4	Six60	Six60^{‡}
5	Gin Wigmore	Gravel & Wine^{‡}
6	Foo Fighters	Wasting Light
7	Lady Gaga	Born This Way
8	Susan Boyle	Someone to Watch Over Me
9	Mumford & Sons	Sigh No More
10	Amy Winehouse	Lioness: Hidden Treasures
11	Coldplay	Mylo Xyloto
12	Adele	19
13	Katy Perry	Teenage Dream
14	Dennis Marsh	Maori Songbook'^{‡}
15	Jessie J	Who You Are
16	Florence and the Machine	Ceremonials
17	One Direction	Up All Night
18	Pink	Greatest Hits... So Far!!!
19	Rihanna	Loud
20	Eddie Low	The Voice in a Million'^{‡}
21	Rihanna	Talk That Talk
22	Pink Floyd	The Best of Pink Floyd: A Foot in the Door
23	LMFAO	Sorry for Party Rocking
24	Brooke Fraser	Flags'^{‡}
25	Red Hot Chili Peppers	I'm With You
26	Amy Winehouse	Back to Black
27	John Rowles	Hits and Love Songs'^{‡}
28	Hayley Westenra	Paradiso'^{‡}
29	Bic Runga	Belle'^{‡}
30	Glee cast	Glee: The Music, Volume 5
31	David Guetta	Nothing but the Beat
32	Kimbra	Vows^{‡}
33	Il Volo	Il Volo
34	Taylor Swift	Speak Now
35	Cold Chisel	All For You: The Best of Cold Chisel
36	Lady Gaga	The Fame Monster
37	Justin Bieber	My Worlds: The Collection
38	Lady Antebellum	Need You Now
39	Ladi6	The Liberation Of...'^{‡}
40	Lady Antebellum	Own the Night
41	Beyoncé	4
42	Susan Boyle	The Gift
43	House of Shem	Island Vibration'^{‡}
44	Burlesque	Burlesque: Original Motion Picture Soundtrack
45	Justin Bieber	Under the Mistletoe
46	Dennis Marsh	Through The Years^{‡}
47	Glee cast	Glee: The Music, Volume 4
48	Avalanche City	Our New Life Above the Ground'^{‡}
49	Stan Walker	From the Inside Out'^{‡}
50	Tiki Taane	In the World of Light'^{‡}
