= All On Our Own =

2009 single by Midnight Youth

Single by Midnight Youth

from the album The Brave Don't Run
- Released: March 2009
- Genre: Rock
- Length: 3:45
- Label: Warner
- Songwriter(s): Aidan Bartlett, Nick Campbell, Simon Oscroft, Jeremy Redmore, Matt Warman.

Midnight Youth singles chronology
"The Letter" (2008)	"All On Our Own" (2009)	"Learning to Fall" (2009)

"All On Our Own" is the New Zealand band Midnight Youth's second single from their first album, The Brave Don't Run. It debuted on the New Zealand Top 40 Singles Chart at number 18 and peaked at number 6. It was certified Gold in New Zealand, selling over 7,500 copies.

Chart (2009)	Peak position
New Zealand Singles Chart	6

== Year-end charts ==
End of year chart (2009)	Position
New Zealand Singles Chart	49
