= Blood to Bone =

Studio album by Gin Wigmore
- Released: 26 June 2015
- Recorded: August 2014, Los Angeles
- Genres: Alternative rock, folk rock
- Length: 37:59
- Labels: Universal, Mercury
- Producers: Gin Wigmore, Stuart Crichton

Gin Wigmore chronology
Gravel & Wine (2011)	Blood to Bone (2015)	Ivory (2018)

Singles from Blood to Bone
- 1. "New Rush" Released: April 20, 2015; 2. "Written in the Water" Released: May 28, 2015

Blood to Bone is the third album from New Zealand alternative rock singer Gin Wigmore. Recorded during a two-week period in California, the album has a different sound from its predecessors, relying mostly on electronic beats, and introspective lyrics where Wigmore reflected in her life choices since predecessor Gravel & Wine, such as breaking an engagement to a long-time lover and moving from Australia to Los Angeles. Upon its release on 24 June 2015, Blood to Bone received positive reviews and was Wigmore's third straight chart-topper at the Official New Zealand Music Chart. It also debuted at No. 13 at the ARIA Charts, her biggest Australian performance.

== Background ==
On 14 August 2014, Wigmore had confirmed she had begun studio production on her third album. Throughout 15 to 22 August, Wigmore had worked in West Hollywood. But on 25 August 2014, Wigmore posted a picture of the beginning of her thirteen-day studio work at Blakeslee Recording Studios in North Hollywood, California.

Wigmore stated the lyrics on the album are a reflection on what happened to her in the two years since predecessor Gravel & Wine, detailing that she only started production after she gathered "some life experience" and created songs in a process that "was a bit like therapy." She about her introspection that "In a way, I wanted to torture myself, I guess or figure out why I felt like this. And I think if you write about it and try and figure it out and then articulate it, you've kind of come to the point where you've - that's kind of the breakthrough in my mind. The biggest catalyst for her life changes was the aftermath of the Vans Warped Tour in 2013, where upon returning to Australia she broke up with her fiancé, and afterwards moved to Los Angeles to start a relationship with letlive. singer Jason Butler, whom she married one year later. The changes of relationship inspired lead single "New Rush", which Wigmore described as "a song about what I was going through at the time, the idea of being in a relationship that I felt very stifled by, almost feigning happiness I guess. You're waking up to someone and there's nothing wrong as such but you're not alive anymore. And I wanted a new rush, a new thrill."

The instrumentation took a different approach from the previous two albums, as Wigmore "worked with people from all walks of musical life - dance, electronic and hip hop". Part of the innovations came from producer Charlie Andrew, who made Wigmore invest in new approaches such as singing falsetto. The album title drew from Wigmore being told during the production of Gravel & Wine that "I needed to bleed for it, I was sweating but I needed to give it blood", and given that the third album had her being more involved in the production side "I am shedding my armour and getting deeper insider myself, bone deep."

On 29 January 2015, Wigmore posted the album cover and title of her the third album, Blood to Bone, which was scheduled for release by Island Records on 26 June 2015 (30 June 2015 in the United States). As of 16 June 2015, the US release date for Blood to Bone had been pushed back to 28 August 2015.

== Promotion ==
On 19 April 2015, "New Rush" was released as the lead single for the album. On 30 April, the music video was released. The song was featured on the soundtrack of FIFA 16. The song reached number 39 on the New Zealand Music Chart.

"Written in the Water" was released as the second single off the album on 28 May. Two separate music videos were filmed for the song. One called "Live However", the other called "Die Regardless". The two videos are a sequence of one storyline, which feature Wigmore's husband, Jason Butler. "Live However" illustrates how Wigmore and Butler steal a bag of cash, and "Die Regardless" features their fate at the hands of a crooked cop. The song failed to chart in any territory.

On the 6 June 2015, she released a new promotional single entitled "Willing to Die" featuring the American rapper Logic and the Australian rapper Suffa of the Hilltop Hoods. The song samples the Alan Lomax recording "Rosie", which David Guetta also sampled on his track "Hey Mama", released in March 2015. The song is featured as a hidden track on the album that follows from "I Will Love You". The song charted at number 38 on the ARIA chart.

== Critical reception ==
Lydia Jenkins of The New Zealand Herald gave the album a 4.5/5 star rating. Jenkins noted that "It's a clear evolution from her past songwriting - more experimental, vulnerable, weighty. But even if that means stretching the ears of her fans, it sounds like Wigmore is relishing the experience."

Dave Matthews of Renowned for Sound gave the album a 4/5 star rating. Matthews went on to elaborate "It's an album that seems personal on every track, as though we're being given an insight into various states of mind that the artist has been through in recent years. Wigmore has re-emerged with a powerful and honest release that is sure to hit the ground running on its release."

Writing for AllMusic, Stephen Thomas Erlewine awarded it 3/5 stars, saying that amidst "the slow, churning moodiness of Blood to Bone" the album was "made interesting by [Wigmore's] pop instincts". James Jennings of Rolling Stone Australia gave the album a 3 star review. "Third album Blood to Bone bottles the messiness and raw emotion of that period on 10 bloodletting tracks that deal exclusively with broken hearts and searching for calm amid chaos. A sense of uncertainty permeates the album as though a bridge is being built towards parts unknown, but it's anchored by Wigmore's striking voice, here veering between sweetly tender and hitting with the force of a blunt instrument."

== Track listing ==
No.	Title	Writer(s)	Length
1.	"New Rush"	Gin Wigmore, Charlie Andrew	3:49
2.	"Nothing to No One"	Wigmore, David Hodges, Steven Solomon	3:46
3.	"This Old Heart"	Wigmore, Khalil Abdul-Rahman, Daniel Tannenbaum	4:43
4.	"Black Parade"	Wigmore, Stuart Crichton	4:06
5.	"Written in the Water"	Wigmore, Crichton	2:46
6.	"In My Way"	Wigmore, Kid Harpoon	3:30
7.	"Holding On to Hell"	Wigmore, Joakim Åhlund	3:13
8.	"DFU"	Wigmore, Crichton	3:05
9.	"24"	Wigmore, Abdul-Rahman, Tannenbaum, Pranam Injeti	4:14
10.	"I Will Love You"	Wigmore	4:47
11.	"Willing to Die" (Hidden track)	Wigmore, Crichton, Alan Lomax, John Lomax, Sir Robert Bryson Hall II, Matthew Lambert	3:13

== Charts ==
=== Weekly charts ===
Chart (2015)	Peak position
Australian Albums (ARIA)	13
New Zealand Albums (RMNZ)	1
US Top Alternative Albums (Billboard)	23

=== Year-end charts ===
Chart (2015)	Position
New Zealand Albums (RMNZ)	27
