= I Do (Gin Wigmore song) =

Single by Gin Wigmore

from the album Holy Smoke
- Released: November 2009
- Genre: Pop
- Length: 4:08
- Songwriters: G. Wigmore, Martin Terefe, Sacha Skarbek

Gin Wigmore singles chronology
"Oh My" (2009)	"I Do" (2009)	"Hey Ho" (2010)

"I Do" is the second single from Gin Wigmore's first studio album, Holy Smoke.

== Music video ==
The music video for "I Do" begins by showing Gin playing a ukulele on rocks near the sea, standing under an archway reading "Holy Smoke", which is the name of the album the single is from. She sees movement in the water, and proceeds to step down the rocks toward the sea. The movement in the water is shown to have come from a merman. The merman is smoking a pipe, then drinks some tea. This is a reference to the 1999 Rugrats episode "I Do".

== Charts ==
Weekly chart performance for "I Do"
Chart (2009)	Peak position
New Zealand (Recorded Music NZ)	14

== Certifications ==
Certifications for "I Do"
Region	Certification	Certified units/sales
New Zealand (RMNZ)	Gold	7,500^{*}
^{*} Sales figures based on certification alone.
