= Jeremy Redmore =

Musician singer-songwriter in New Zealand

- Born: Jeremy Redmore; Auckland, New Zealand
- Origin: Tauranga, Bay of Plenty, New Zealand
- Genres: Indie folk, pop, rock, Children's music
- Occupations: Singer, songwriter
- Instrument: Guitar
- Years active: 2006–present
- Label: Redmore Books
- Formerly of: Midnight Youth
- Website: jeremyredmore.com

Jeremy Redmore is a musician, producer and author. In his early career he rose to fame as the main creative force behind award-winning New Zealand band Midnight Youth. Since then he has released three albums as a solo artist, the latter of which was created for children; a focus which has dominated his creative output since 2022 and includes a music-themed picture book.

== Background ==
Redmore was born in Auckland before receiving his education at Tauranga Boys' College and the University of Auckland.

He has stated that the genesis of musical and creative career began in his last year of high school when two major life events occurred: his mother passed away and he was asked by a teacher to front the Tauranga Boys' College Big Band.

While completing a Bachelor of Arts majoring in history, Redmore began working as a journalist for Television New Zealand, a career he continued for 20 years alongside his creative output.

His first commercially released song, By My Side, came out in March 2005 via his eponymously named band Redmore, after the group won a music competition named Coke Launchpad.

By mid-2006, Redmore had joined Midnight Youth, which eventually led to considerable commercial and critical success and heralded the beginning of a long professional career in the music industry.

== Music career ==
=== Midnight Youth 2006–2012 ===
Redmore started making an impact in New Zealand's music scene after joining New Zealand rock band Midnight Youth in 2006. Their platinum-selling debut album The Brave Don't Run peaked at number 2 in the RIANZ New Zealand Album Chart in 2009 and included two top 20, gold-selling singles, All on Our Own and "The Letter". The band won the Best Rock Album award, Best Group award and Best Engineer award at the 2009 New Zealand Music Awards as well as a Silver Scroll for the most-played song of 2009. In 2011 they released their second album World Comes Calling before Redmore quit the band to pursue a solo career in late 2012.

=== Solo career 2012–present ===
Redmore released his largely self-produced debut solo album, Clouds Are Alive, in July 2014 which reached number six on the Official New Zealand Music Chart and spawned hit single "Bad Philosophy". At the end of April 2014, Redmore opened for Ed Sheeran at his iHeartRadio showcase at Auckland's ASB Theatre. The third single from the record, "One Day Alone", was released with a music video created by seven different directors from across the world. Before 2015, Redmore performed at a number of New Zealand celebrity weddings including those of Mike Hosking, Dane Rumble and Angela Dotchin. Redmore also featured on two tracks for hip hop artist PNC (rapper) - Fame Kills All and Lit / Slow Down.

After going over five years without releasing new music, Redmore announced via a series of cryptic videos on his social media pages that he would be releasing a new project titled The Brightest Flame from November 2019. The album was released in five separate chapters over the course of just over four months, and tells a story of heartbreak and healing. The Brightest Flame, came together as a full album on 20 March 2020 and was released under Redmore's own record label. The album was promoted with a variety of creative marketing initiatives including a collaboration with the Museum of Broken Relationships in Dunedin, an "Unhappy Hour" event alongside Valentine's Day in Auckland as well as an initiative called "Songs to your Steps" to help those isolated by the COVID-19 pandemic in Auckland.

Then, over the course of six weeks during the lockdown measures taken by New Zealand's government in response to COVID-19, Redmore wrote 12 songs based on stories submitted anonymously by the general public about their isolation and lockdown experiences; as part of a project called "Telltale Tunes".

In October 2020, Redmore commissioned the release of a remix EP centred around the song "One Amongst 1000", from his album The Brightest Flame. The EP contained remixes of the song by Coldroom, Joseph Snook, Hahko and Vanguard One.

In May 2022, Redmore released his debut children's song, Sing Like A Unicorn. The song was accompanied by a mixed-media stop motion music video, created by director Adam Rowland, which won the award for Best Music Video at the 2023 New Zealand Children's Music Awards.

The pair combined again in December 2023 with follow-up single Singalong, which went on to be nominated for Best Music Video at the 2024 New Zealand Children's Music Awards and win the award for Animated Video of the Year at the 2024 Global Children Entertainment Awards.

Redmore continued to release regular music through 2023 and 2024, combining with composer Levi Patel on an EP titled Migrations as well as standalone single Daydream Driver.

Alongside his own releases, Redmore has written songs for the likes of Brennan Heart, Giuseppe Ottaviani, Kronos, Hysta, Primeshock, Lexurus and Martin Jasper.

In October 2025, Redmore released his debut album of children's music, Singalongercise, which promotes group singing and choreographed movement as a way to boost the wellbeing of children in classroom and family environments. This release led to Redmore being nominated for the Best Artist award at the 2026 Aotearoa Children's Music Awards.

Redmore has also appeared as a featured vocalist for Synthony in shows across New Zealand, Canada and Europe since 2021.

== Sing Like A Unicorn ==
Redmore's debut children's book, Sing Like A Unicorn, was released 16 November 2021 under his own publishing imprint Redmore Books Ltd. Redmore said the book was inspired by his own journey of finding self-confidence through singing and hopes children who read the book can do the same. The book's website says it was "wholly inspired by the idea that inside each of us is a completely unique individual that can be happier, more fulfilled and make the world a better place through embracing their originality. And one of the easiest and most fun ways to do that is by singing!"

Its first edition was a limited-run hardback which sold out within two weeks of publication. On 2 May 2022, a paperback edition of the book was released alongside a song - written by Redmore - and music video, directed by Adam Rowland.

== TV ==
Redmore has presented two nationally broadcast television shows in New Zealand. The first aired primarily across Air New Zealand's inflight entertainment system in April 2013 – B-Guided TV's sixth season involved Redmore visiting tourist hotspots across the country including Queenstown, Wellington and Auckland. It aired on Choice TV in August the same year. Redmore's second major television job was presenting the 2014 Smokefree Rockquest television series which first aired 1 November 2014 on channel FOUR

In 2021 Redmore appeared as a vocal coach and mentor on the second season of TVNZ's Popstars.

== Theatre ==
In November 2014 Redmore made his theatrical stage debut with the role of Simon Zealotes in the Kensington Swan Season of Auckland Theatre Company's production of Jesus Christ Superstar. The show ran for six weeks and 55 shows at Auckland's Q Theatre.

== Discography ==
=== With Midnight Youth ===
- The Brave Don't Run (2009) Warner Music NZ
- World Comes Calling (2011) Warner Music NZ

=== Albums ===
Year	Title	Details	Peak chart positions
Year	Title	Details	NZ
2014	Clouds Are Alive	Released: 25 July 2014; Label: Redmore Books/Warner Music NZ	6
2020	The Brightest Flame	Released: 20 March 2020; Label: Redmore Books	-
2025	Singalongercise	Released: 21 October 2025; Label: Redmore Books	-
"—" denotes a recording that did not chart or was not released in that territory.
