= Oh My (Gin Wigmore song) =

2009 single by Gin Wigmore

Single by Gin Wigmore

from the album Holy Smoke
- Released: July 2009
- Genre: Pop
- Length: 4:16
- Label: Universal
- Songwriter: Gin Wigmore
- Producer: Mike Elizondo

Gin Wigmore singles chronology
"Brother" (2009)	"Oh My" (2009)	"I Do" (2009)

"Oh My" is the first single from New Zealand singer-songwriter Gin Wigmore's first studio album, Holy Smoke. The song debuted on the New Zealand Singles Chart at number 21, peaking at number four. It was certified platinum in New Zealand in February 2010, selling over 15,000 copies. "Oh My" the opening song to the New Zealand show The Almighty Johnsons.

== Track listing ==
iTunes Store single track listing
No.	Title	Length
1.	"Oh My"	4:16
2.	"Good News"	3:15

== Charts ==
=== Weekly charts ===
Weekly chart performance for "Oh My"
Chart (2009)	Peak position
New Zealand (Recorded Music NZ)	4

=== Year-end charts ===
Year-end chart performance for "Oh My"
Chart (2009)	Position
New Zealand (Recorded Music NZ)	30

== Certifications ==
Certifications for "Oh My"
Region	Certification	Certified units/sales
New Zealand (RMNZ)	Platinum	15,000^{*}
^{*} Sales figures based on certification alone.
