= Uncontrollably Fond =

2016 South Korean television series

- Promotional poster
- Also known as: Lightly, Ardently
- Hangul: 함부로 애틋하게
- RR: Hamburo aeteuthage
- MR: Hamburo aet'ŭthage
- Genre: Romance; Melodrama; Tragedy
- Written by: Lee Kyung-hee
- Directed by: Park Hyun-suk; Cha Young-hoon
- Starring: Kim Woo-bin; Bae Suzy; Lim Ju-hwan; Lim Ju-eun
- Opening theme: "Only You" by Junggigo
- Country of origin: South Korea
- Original language: Korean
- No. of episodes: 20

Production
- Executive producer: Kim Sung-geun
- Producers: Kim Min-kyung; Park Woo-ram (KBS); Ahn Jae-hyun; Shin Sang-yoon (Samhwa Networks); Hwang Ki-yong; Teddy Hoon-tak Jung (SidusHQ)
- Production location: South Korea
- Running time: 59 minutes
- Production companies: Samhwa Networks; SidusHQ

Original release
- Network: KBS2
- Release: July 6 – September 8, 2016

Uncontrollably Fond (Korean: 함부로 애틋하게) is a 2016 Korean drama starring Kim Woo-bin and Bae Suzy. It aired on KBS2 from July 6 to September 8, 2016, every Wednesday and Thursday at 21:55 (KST).

== Synopsis ==
Shin Joon-young (Kim Woo-bin) and Noh Eul (Bae Suzy), classmates separated during their teenage years due to a rocky relationship, soon meet each other in adulthood. Joon-young is now a top actor-singer, while Noh Eul is a documentary producer.

Noh Eul had a tough childhood, as her father died in a hit-and-run, prompting her to quit school and live for herself and her brother. On the other hand, Joon-young's life planned out for him. His mother wanted him to become a prosecutor to follow in the footsteps of his estranged father, but an incident caused him to quit law school and become a singer-actor.

The two later reunite when Noh Eul is tasked to film Shin Joon-young's documentary. She convinces the producer that she can obtain his consent for the documentary shoot. Initially, Joon-young gave Noh Eul a hard time, but eventually agrees to participate in the documentary. As they work together, he endeavors to mend their relationship and win her heart back.

== Cast ==
=== Main ===
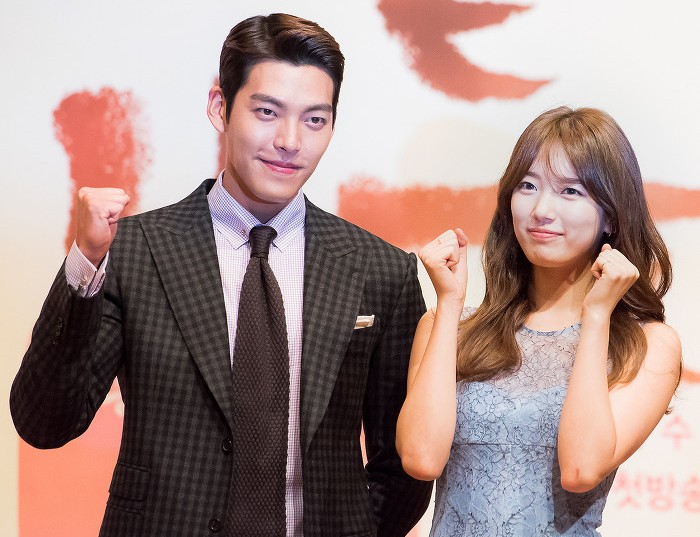
Lead stars Kim Woo-bin (left) and Bae Suzy (right) at the press conference on July 4, 2016

- Kim Woo-bin as Shin Joon-young
- Bae Suzy as Noh Eul
- Lim Ju-hwan as Choi Ji-tae (alias Lee Hyeon-woo)
- Lim Ju-eun as Yoon Jeong-eun

=== Supporting ===
==== People around Shin Joon-young ====
- Jin Kyung as Shin Young-ok (mother)
- Choi Moo-sung as Jang Jung-shik (Jang Kook-young's father)
- Hwang Jung-min as Jang Jung-ja
- Park Soo-young as CEO Namgoong
- Jung Soo-kyo as Jang Kook-young (Jang Jung-shik's son)
- Jang Hee-ryung as Jang Man-ok

==== People around Noh Eul ====
- Lee Seo-won as Noh Jik (brother)
- Kim Min-young as Ko Na-ri (best friend)
  - Park Hwan-hee as teenage Ko Na-ri (episode 2)
- Kim Jae-hwa as Kim Bong-suk (tripe shop owner)
- Lee Won-jong as Noh Jang-soo (Noh Eul's father; episode 2)

==== People around Choi Ji-tae ====
- Yu Oh-seong as Choi Hyeon-joon (father)
- Jung Seon-kyung as Lee Eun-soo (mother)
- Ryu Won as Choi Ha-roo (sister)

==== People around Yoon Jeong-eun ====
- Jung Dong-hwan as Yoon Sung-ho

=== Special appearances ===
- Lee Jun-ho
- Lee Yu-bi
- Lee Jin-kwon
- Kim Young-kwang
- Kim Min-jae
- Kim Byeong-ok as Hyun-joon's older brother
- Kim Ki-bang as Noh Eul's boss
- Yoon Park as Seo Yoon-hoo

== Production ==
Filming began on November 26, 2015, at Kyungnam University in Changwon, South Korea, and ended on April 12, 2016.

== Original soundtrack ==
Uncontrollably Fond Original Sound Track

Soundtrack album by Various Artists
- Released: Volume 1: July 29, 2016 (digital); August 11, 2016 (CD); Volume 2: September 8, 2016 (digital); September 13, 2016 (CD)
- Genres: Soundtrack, ballad
- Labels: Samhwa Networks/SidusHQ/Gazi Contents/LOEN; L200001286 (Volume 1); L200001299 (Volume 2)

The original soundtrack of Uncontrollably Fond was divided into two volumes: Volume 1 consists of songs from Parts 1 to 8 and "Golden Love" by Midnight Youth from Part 14 (also known as the pop OST). On the other hand, Volume 2 comprises songs from Parts 9 to 15, along with tracks by New Empire from Part 14.

=== Part 1 ===
No.	Title	Artist	Length
1.	"Ring My Bell"	Suzy (Miss A)	3:27
2.	"Ring My Bell" (Inst.)		3:27
Total length:			6:54

=== Part 2 ===
No.	Title	Artist	Length
1.	"Find the Differences (틀린그림찾기)"	Lim Seul-ong, Kisum	3:14
2.	"Find the Differences" (Inst.)		3:14
Total length:			6:28

=== Part 3 ===
No.	Title	Artist	Length
1.	"Say Goodbye (My Heart Speaks) (가슴이 말해)"	Kim Na-young	4:09
2.	"Say Goodbye (My Heart Speaks)" (Inst.)		4:09
Total length:			8:18

=== Part 4 ===
No.	Title	Artist	Length
1.	"Only U"	Junggigo	3:15
2.	"Only U" (Inst.)		3:15
Total length:			6:30

=== Part 5 ===
No.	Title	Artist	Length
1.	"I Miss You (보고싶어)"	Hyolyn (Sistar)	3:49
2.	"I Miss You (보고싶어)" (Inst.)		3:49
Total length:			7:38

=== Part 6 ===
No.	Title	Artist	Length
1.	"Picture In My Head (내 머릿속 사진)"	Kim Woo-bin	3:44
2.	"Picture In My Head (내 머릿속 사진)" (Inst.)		3:44
3.	"Do You Know (혹시 아니)"	Kim Woo-bin	4:15
4.	"Do You Know (혹시 아니)" (Inst.)		4:15
Total length:			15:58

=== Part 7 ===
No.	Title	Artist	Length
1.	"Don't Push Me (밀지마)"	Wendy, Seulgi (Red Velvet)	3:20
2.	"Don't Push Me (밀지마)" (Inst.)		3:20
3.	"Don't Push Me (밀지마) (Ballad Ver.)"	Wendy and Seulgi (Red Velvet)	3:30
4.	"Don't Push Me (밀지마) (Ballad Ver.)" (Inst.)		3:30
Total length:			13:40

=== Part 8 ===
No.	Title	Artist	Length
1.	"From When and Until When (어디부터 어디까지)"	Tei	4:07
2.	"From When and Until When (어디부터 어디까지)" (Inst.)		4:07
Total length:			8:14

=== Part 9 ===
No.	Title	Artist	Length
1.	"I Love You (사랑해요)"	Kim Bum-soo	4:08
2.	"I Love You (사랑해요)" (Inst.)		4:08
Total length:			8:16

=== Part 10 ===
No.	Title	Artist	Length
1.	"Love Is Hurting (사랑이 아프다)"	Hwanhee (Fly to the Sky)	4:01
2.	"Love Is Hurting (사랑이 아프다)" (Inst.)		4:01
Total length:			8:02

=== Part 11 ===
No.	Title	Artist	Length
1.	"My Love"	Honey G	3:38
2.	"My Love" (Inst.)		3:38
Total length:			7:16

=== Part 12 ===
No.	Title	Artist	Length
1.	"Shower (소나기)"	Eric Nam	4:28
2.	"Shower (소나기)" (Inst.)		4:28
Total length:			8:56

=== Part 13 ===
No.	Title	Artist	Length
1.	"I Can Live (살 수 있다고)"	Kim Yeon-joon (김연준)	3:45
2.	"I Can Live (살 수 있다고)" (Inst.)		3:45
Total length:			7:30

=== Part 14 (Uncontrollably Fond Pop OST) ===
No.	Title	Artist	Length
1.	"A Little Braver"	New Empire	3:28
2.	"A Little Braver" (Inst.)		3:28
3.	"Golden Love"	Midnight Youth	4:01
4.	"Golden Love" (Inst.)		4:01
5.	"Across The Ocean"	New Empire	3:50
6.	"Across The Ocean" (Inst.)		3:50
Total length:			22:38

=== Part 15 ===
No.	Title	Artist	Length
1.	"When It's Good (좋을땐)"	Bae Suzy (Miss A)	4:14
2.	"When It's Good (좋을땐)" (Inst.)		4:14
Total length:			8:28

Disc 2:
No.	Title	Artist	Length
1.	"Ambition"	Various Artists	3:28
2.	"Blues Life"	Various Artists	1:43
3.	"Bright Intro"	Various Artists	2:26
4.	"Chaos"	Various Artists	3:26
5.	"Cotton Candy"	Various Artists	2:05
6.	"Haromica Theme"	Various Artists	2:50
7.	"Hurt Love"	Various Artists	2:12
8.	"More of Mystery"	Various Artists	3:06
9.	"Need Somebody"	Various Artists	3:20
10.	"Over and Over"	Various Artists	2:11
11.	"Pain"	Various Artists	1:56
12.	"Revenge"	Various Artists	1:42
13.	"Running Away"	Various Artists	1:10
14.	"Running Away Behind"	Various Artists	2:35
15.	"Shining Bridge"	Various Artists	1:36
16.	"Shining Day"	Various Artists	2:48
17.	"Sunset"	Various Artists	2:11
18.	"Theme O3"	Various Artists	2:10
19.	"The Only One"	Various Artists	3:02
20.	"The Way to You"	Various Artists	2:18
21.	"Wherever You Are"	Various Artists	1:59

=== Charted songs ===
Chart performance

Title	Year	Peak chart positions	Sales	Remarks
Title	Year	KOR Gaon	Sales	Remarks
"Ring My Bell" (Suzy (Miss A))	2016	18	KOR: 343,613	Part 1
"Find The Differences" (Lim Seul-ong, Kisum)	2016	34	KOR: 175,311	Part 2
Say Goodbye (My Heart Speaks) (Kim Na-young)	2016	28	KOR: 150,245	Part 3
"Only You" (Junggigo)	2016	40	KOR: 194,770	Part 4
I Miss You" (Hyolyn (Sistar))	2016	40	KOR: 117,394	Part 5
"Picture In My Head" (Kim Woo-bin)	2016	91	—N/a	Part 6
"Don't Push Me Away" (Wendy, Seulgi)	2016	25	KOR: 142,016	Part 7
"From When and Until When" (Tei)	2016	66	KOR: 40,881	Part 8
"I Love You" (Kim Bum-soo)	2016	19	KOR: 294,380+	Part 9
"Love Hurts" (Hwanhee (Fly to the Sky))	2016	19	KOR: 240,683+	Part 10
"When It's Good" (Suzy (Miss A))	2016	84	KOR: 26,583	Part 15

== Ratings ==
Ep.	Original broadcast date	Average audience share			
Ep.	Original broadcast date	Nielsen Korea		TNmS	
Ep.	Original broadcast date	Nationwide	Seoul	Nationwide	Seoul
1	July 6, 2016	12.5% (4th)	13.8% (4th)	11.5% (6th)	12.7% (3rd)
2	July 7, 2016	12.5% (5th)	12.8% (4th)	9.3% (12th)	9.4% (8th)
3	July 13, 2016	11.9% (5th)	13.3% (4th)	10.7% (8th)	12.3% (4th)
4	July 14, 2016	11.0% (6th)	12.0% (4th)	9.4% (11th)	10.9% (7th)
5	July 20, 2016	12.9% (4th)	14.0% (4th)	10.9% (7th)	11.4% (5th)
6	July 21, 2016	11.1% (7th)	11.5% (6th)	10.0% (10th)	10.9% (9th)
7	July 27, 2016	8.6% (12th)	9.5% (10th)	8.7% (16th)	9.4% (11th)
8	July 28, 2016	8.9% (14th)	10.1% (10th)	8.0% (19th)	9.5% (12th)
9	August 3, 2016	8.2% (12th)	9.0% (9th)	7.0% (19th)	8.0% (13th)
10	August 4, 2016	8.1% (12th)	9.0% (11th)	7.1% (NR)	7.6% (15th)
11	August 10, 2016	7.9% (15th)	7.8% (17th)	7.3% (NR)	8.1% (15th)
12	August 11, 2016	10.0% (5th)	10.6% (4th)	9.6% (8th)	9.9% (5th)
13	August 17, 2016	8.0% (12th)	8.6% (12th)	6.8% (19th)	6.8% (18th)
14	August 18, 2016	8.7% (12th)	9.6% (9th)	6.6% (NR)	6.9% (18th)
15	August 24, 2016	8.0% (16th)	8.4% (14th)	6.4% (NR)	7.1% (NR)
16	August 25, 2016	7.7% (17th)	8.4% (16th)	6.1% (NR)	7.6% (NR)
17	August 31, 2016	8.0% (16th)	8.0% (17th)	7.0% (NR)	6.1% (NR)
18	September 1, 2016	7.9% (14th)	8.5% (14th)	7.2% (NR)	6.8% (18th)
19	September 7, 2016	8.0% (16th)	7.6% (17th)	7.2% (NR)	8.0% (17th)
20	September 8, 2016	8.4% (15th)	9.0% (14th)	7.4% (20th)	7.3% (NR)
Average		11.8%	10.1%	8.2%	8.8%
In the table above, the blue numbers represent the lowest ratings and the red numbers represent the highest ratings.; NR denotes that the drama did not rank in the top 20 daily programs on that date.

== Awards and nominations ==
Year	Award	Category	Recipient	Result
2016	5th APAN Star Awards	Excellence Award, Actor in a Miniseries	Kim Woo-bin	Nominated
2016	5th APAN Star Awards	Excellence Award, Actress in a Miniseries	Bae Suzy	Nominated
2016	1st Asia Artist Awards	Best Star Award	Bae Suzy	Won
2016	30th KBS Drama Awards	Top Excellence Award, Actress	Bae Suzy	Nominated
2016	30th KBS Drama Awards	Excellence Award, Actor in a Mid-length Drama	Kim Woo-bin	Nominated
2016	30th KBS Drama Awards	Excellence Award, Actress in a Mid-length Drama	Bae Suzy	Nominated
2016	30th KBS Drama Awards	Netizen Award	Kim Woo-bin	Nominated
2016	30th KBS Drama Awards	Netizen Award	Bae Suzy	Nominated
2016	30th KBS Drama Awards	Best Couple Award	Kim Woo-bin & Bae Suzy	Nominated
