= Ivory (Gin Wigmore album) =

Studio album by Gin Wigmore
- Released: 6 April 2018
- Genres: Alternative rock; blues; blue-eyed soul; funk
- Length: 37:08
- Label: Island Records Australia
- Producers: Gin Wigmore; Steve Rusch; Allen Salmon

Gin Wigmore chronology
Blood to Bone (2015)	Ivory (2018)	Beautiful Mess (2026)

Singles from Ivory
- 1. "Dirty Mercy" Released: 21 October 2016; 2. "Hallow Fate" Released: 23 June 2017; 3. "Beatnik Trip" Released: 31 July 2017; 4. "Cabrona" Released: 17 November 2017; 5. "Girl Gang" Released: 9 March 2018

Ivory is the fourth studio album by L.A.-based, New Zealand alternative rock singer Gin Wigmore, named after her son. The album was released on 6 April 2018 by Island Records Australia and peaked at number 11 in New Zealand. Ivory explores a heavier alternative rock sound along with a heavy blue-eyed soul vibe and doo-wop-inspired ballads counting on a funky, groovy production. The lyrics of the album provide commentary on feminism, empowerment, and a return to roots.

== Track listing ==
No.	Title	Writer(s)	Length
1.	"Hallow Fate"	Gin Wigmore, Steve Rusch	3:00
2.	"Odeum"	Wigmore, Rusch	2:39
3.	"Beatnik Trip"	Wigmore, Rusch, Benjamin Hudson McIldowie	2:44
4.	"Dirty Mercy"	Wigmore, Rusch, Marc Orrell	3:25
5.	"Cabrona"	Wigmore, Rusch	2:34
6.	"Cold Cave"	Wigmore, Frank Rogers, Matt Thiessen	4:12
7.	"Bad Got Me Good"	Wigmore, Rusch, Rocco DellaNeve	4:10
8.	"Hard Luck"	Wigmore, Rusch, Neil Mason	2:37
9.	"Fall Out of Love"	Wigmore, Rusch, Bianca Gisselle, Ennio Morricone	3:41
10.	"Head to Head"	Wigmore, Rusch, Gabe Simon	2:58
11.	"Young Ones"	Wigmore, Rusch	4:08
12.	"Girl Gang"	Wigmore, Rusch, Allen Salmon	3:00
Total length:			37:08

== Personnel ==
Personnel credits adapted from Tidal.

- Jamelle Adisa – horn arrangements (3), trumpet (3, 7), horn (7)
- Bob Allaire – strings (6)
- Toiya Barnes – backing vocals (6, 11)
- Candace Coles – backing vocals (3, 5–9, 11)
- Julie Davies – backing vocals (6, 11)
- Rocco DellaNeve – piano (1, 3, 5, 7, 8), Mellotron (2, 11), organ (3, 5, 7, 11), digital piano (6, 7), bass guitar (7)
- Aja Grant – backing vocals (6, 11)
- Aric Improta – drums (1–5, 7–11)
- Christopher Johnson – trombone (3, 7–9)
- Emily Lazar – mastering (1–3, 5–12)
- Bianca Gisselle Marrero – backing vocals (9)
- Mischa Mandel – backing vocals (11)
- Turie McCormick – backing vocals (6, 11)
- Abraham McDonald – backing vocals (6, 11)
- Keith McKelley – saxophone (3, 8), tenor saxophone (7, 9)
- Claudius Mittendorfer – mixing (all tracks)
- Marc Orrell – backing vocals, bass guitar, electric guitar (4)
- Christine de Pauw – backing vocals (6, 11)
- Steve Rusch – engineering, production (all tracks); bass guitar (1–5, 12), electric guitar (1–3, 7, 11), samples (1, 2), synthesizer (1–7, 9, 11), drums (3, 5, 7), percussion (9, 12), ukulele (9)
- Raphael Saadiq – bass guitar (8)
- Allen Salmon – production, backing vocals, bass guitar, drum programming, drums, electric guitar, guitar, percussion, piano (12)
- Joe Santa Maria – baritone saxophone (1)
- John Schreffler – electric guitar (2, 3, 5–10), backing vocals (4), guitar (12)
- Bridget Silva – backing vocals (6, 11)
- Gabe Simon – backing vocals, bass guitar, electric guitar, piano, synthesizer (10)
- Taura Stinson – backing vocals (3, 5, 7–9, 11), vocals (6)
- Dylan Wiggins – synthesizer (1–3, 5, 7, 10, 11), piano (6)
- Gin Wigmore – production, vocals (all tracks); backing vocals (1–4), piano (1, 6, 9, 12), samples (1), synthesizer (1, 2, 4, 11), tambourine (1, 3, 5, 7, 8); percussion, sound effects (2)

== Charts ==
Chart (2018)	Peak position
New Zealand Albums (RMNZ)	11
