= The Weekend (album) =

Studio album by Smashproof
- Genres: Rap, Hip hop
- Label: Move The Crowd

Singles from The Weekend
- 1. "Brother" Released: January 5, 2009; 2. "It's Friday" Released: April 27, 2009; 3. "Ordinary Life" Released: July 20, 2009

The Weekend is the debut studio album by New Zealand Group Smashproof. It was released on March 23, 2009

== Track listing ==
No.	Title	Length
1.	"Clocking Out (Intro)"	0:30
2.	"The Weekend"	4:37
3.	"Brother" (feat. Gin Wigmore)	3:50
4.	"It's Friday"	4:59
5.	"Hot Boy"	4:07
6.	"The Morning After"	3:04
7.	"Pressure (interlude)"	1:27
8.	"I Could Take You There" (feat. Mzj, Stunner & Mr Sicc)	3:48
9.	"Somebody Like Me"	3:23
10.	"Backstage (Interlude)"	0:35
11.	"Breath In, Breath Out" (feat Ethical)	4:50
12.	"All Night Long" (feat. Nina Sky)	3:49
13.	"My Crib" (feat. Awa & Pieter T)	5:44
14.	"Sunday Star Times"	4:43
15.	"Ordinary Life"	7:54
Total length:		57:20

== Charts ==
Chart (2009)	Peak position
New Zealand Albums Chart	3
