= Gravel & Wine =

Studio album by Gin Wigmore
- Released: 7 November 2011
- Genres: Alternative rock, dark cabaret, folk rock
- Length: 40:25
- Labels: Universal, Mercury
- Producer: Butch Walker

Gin Wigmore chronology
Holy Smoke (2009)	Gravel & Wine (2011)	Blood to Bone (2015)

Singles from Gravel & Wine
- 1. "Black Sheep" Released: 26 September 2011; 2. "Man Like That" Released: 1 February 2012

Gravel & Wine is the second album from New Zealand pop singer Gin Wigmore, released in New Zealand on 7 November 2011. The album was recorded in Santa Monica, California during the second quarter of 2011 under producer Butch Walker and counting with his backing band, The Black Widows. Before production begun, Wigmore travelled for two months in Mississippi and Alabama to get a Southern United States inspiration.

The first single from the album "Black Sheep", and was released 26 September 2011, debuting at #13 in the Official New Zealand Music Chart. The album was released on 7 November 2011. It debuted at number 1, and received a Recorded Music NZ double platinum certification, meaning over 15,000 units sold.

Wigmore released music videos for the tracks "Man Like That" and "If Only".

The single "Black Sheep" was featured in a trailer for Orange Is the New Black, and it appeared in the 2012 episode "Hope for the Hopeless" of Grey's Anatomy, the 2012 episode "Shape Shifted" of Teen Wolf, the 2013 episode "Hitting the Fan" of The Good Wife, and a Guinness Black Lager commercial. She also appeared singing it on "Gift of Revenge", a segment of ABC's television show Revenge season 2, episode 7.

The song "Kill of the Night" was featured in various media, including another episode of Teen Wolf: it plays during the 2015 film Spy, the 2012 episode "Downward Spiral" of 666 Park Avenue, and the 2019 episode "The Day That Wasn't" of The Umbrella Academy, as well as being the theme song for cable channel AMC's annual airing of Halloween movies and shows titled FearFest. It was also the theme song for the short lived 2016 Netflix series Crazyhead.

The song "Man Like That" is used in the James Bond Skyfall tie-in spot from Heineken; Wigmore herself is seen performing the song towards the end of it. The advertisement also featured many Bond stars from various Bond movies.

Gravel & Wine was released in the U.S. on 2 April 2013, and debuted at 87 on the Billboard 200, with over 6,000 units sold. Wigmore promoted her North American debut by opening for Phillip Phillips, and afterwards appearing on the entire 2013 Vans Warped Tour.

== Background ==
In September 2011, Wigmore revealed the title and release of her new album Gravel & Wine on her official Facebook page.

== Promotion ==
The first single was slated to be "Black Sheep"; it was released 26 September 2011 and peaked at #13. The album was released on 7 November 2011. It debuted at #29 on the Australian Albums Chart. Wigmore released music videos for "Man Like That" and "If Only".

Gravel & Wine was released in the U.S. on 2 April 2013.

== Critical reception ==
Lydia Jenkins of The New Zealand Herald gave the album a 4.5/5 star review. "The whole album sees (Wigmore) taking the drama and character that made Holy Smoke track Hey Ho so successful, and extending it whole-heartedly with terrific results. Turns out Gin's ageing nicely, just like a good wine."

AllMusic gave the album a 3.5/5 star review with a user rating of 4/5 stars. Steve Leggett describe the album as "a huge-sounding dance-pop album full of songs geared for both the dancefloor and the radio stations that drive people to go there, all big, stomping drums and kinetic high vocals about men who don't measure up, jealous girls, and the trashy, dangerous side of love and other hazards."

Sputnikmusic gave the album a 3/5 rating, with a review summary "It's pretty much a kitchen sink piece of pastiche."

== Track listing ==
Gravel & Wine track listing
No.	Title	Writer(s)	Length
1.	"Black Sheep"	Gin Wigmore, Butch Walker	3:03
2.	"Man Like That"	Wigmore, Walker	2:50
3.	"Poison"	Wigmore, Walker, Dan Wilson	3:07
4.	"Kill of the Night"	Wigmore, Julian Hamilton, Gary Clark	3:25
5.	"Devil in Me"	Wigmore, Eric Rosse	3:25
6.	"If Only"	Wigmore, Wilson	4:45
7.	"Dirty Love"	Wigmore, Mike Viola	2:52
8.	"Happy Ever After"	Wigmore, Walker, Jake Sinclair	3:22
9.	"Saturday Smile"	Wigmore, Rosse	3:22
10.	"Sweet Hell (ft. Butch Walker)"	Wigmore, Walker, Lee McCutcheon, Andreas Levander	3:36
11.	"Singin' My Soul"	Wigmore	3:09

Bonus track (International editions outside New Zealand)
No.	Title	Writer(s)	Length
12.	"Don't Stop" (previously released on Holy Smoke)	Wigmore, Mike Elizando	3:26

Japanese bonus tracks (Previously released on Extended Play)
No.	Title	Writer(s)	Length
13.	"These Roses"	Wigmore	3:13
14.	"Hallelujah"	Wigmore	3:30

Target exclusive bonus tracks
No.	Title	Writer(s)	Length
13.	"Moving On to Gone"	Wigmore	3:10
14.	"Kick This Love"	Wigmore, Andy Stochkansky, Jamie Hartman	3:12

== Personnel ==
- Gin Wigmore - vocals, drums, guitar, mandolin, organ, percussion

The Black Widows

- Butch Walker – production, vocals
- Fran Capitanelli – guitars, percussion, backing vocals
- Jake Sinclair – bass guitar, drums, keyboards, backing vocals

Others

- Eric Rosse – piano, production in "Saturday Smile"
- Rob Mathes – string arrangements and conduction
- Claudius Mittendorfer – mixing

== Charts ==
=== Weekly charts ===
Weekly chart performance for Gravel & Wine
Chart (2011)	Peak position
Australian Albums Chart	29
Austrian Albums Chart	65
German Albums Chart	69
New Zealand Albums Chart	1
Swiss Albums Charts	60
Billboard 200	87

=== Year-end charts ===
Year-end chart performance for Gravel & Wine
Chart	Position
New Zealand Albums (2011)	5
New Zealand Albums (2012)	27

== Release history ==
Release history and formats for Gravel & Wine
Region	Date
New Zealand	7 November 2011
Japan	5 December 2012
United States	2 April 2013
