= Hey Ho (Gin Wigmore song) =

Single by Gin Wigmore

from the album Holy Smoke
- Released: January 2010
- Genre: Pop, mariachi
- Length: 4:04
- Songwriter(s): Gin Wigmore / Dan Wilson
- Producer(s): Tony Buchen

Gin Wigmore singles chronology
"I Do" (2009)	"Hey Ho" (2010)	"Too Late for Lovers" (2010)

"Hey Ho" is the third single from Gin Wigmore's first studio album, Holy Smoke. The song was featured in season 6 finale of Weeds.

== Background ==
"Hey Ho" was co-written by Wigmore and Dan Wilson in Minneapolis, Minnesota. Wigmore said the song was "something dark, some kind of Mexican, Day of the Dead mariachi ... some weird cool shit. So we [Wigmore and Wilson] were just like, 'hey ho'."

Lyrically, Wigmore said "I, being a girl, can be tormenting the man...I just really like that. I guess that's the feminist in me."

"Hey Ho" appeared at the end of the Weeds Season 6 finale, "Theoretical Love Is Not Dead".

== Music video ==
Wigmore singing in the music video

The music video was directed by Moh Azima in Los Angeles, and shooting finished in February 2010. It was released in March 2010.

== Track listing ==
iTunes Store single track listing
No.	Title	Length
1.	"Hey Ho"	4:04
2.	"Don't"	3:10

== Charts ==
Weekly chart performance for "Hey Ho"
Chart (2010)	Peak position
New Zealand (Recorded Music NZ)	21
