= World Comes Calling =

Studio album by Midnight Youth
- Released: October 2011
- Genre: Rock

Midnight Youth chronology
The Brave Don't Run (2009)	World Comes Calling (2011)

World Comes Calling is a second and final studio album by New Zealand rock band Midnight Youth. It was released in October 2011.

== Track listing ==
1. The Street
2. Down Inside
3. Won't Stop
4. Who Said You're Free
5. Come One, Come All
6. World Comes Calling
7. Too Young To Wonder
8. Listen
9. French Girl
10. Mark My Words

== Charts ==
Chart performance for World Comes Calling
Chart (2011)	Peak position
New Zealand Albums (RMNZ)	4
