= Smashproof =

New Zealand hip hop band

- Origin: Auckland, New Zealand
- Genres: New Zealand hip hop, alternative hip hop, trip hop
- Years active: 2009–present
- Labels: Move The Crowd Records, Universal Music Group
- Members: Tyree; Young Sid; Deach
- Website: Move The Crowd

Smashproof is a New Zealand hip hop group, consisting of Sid Diamond, Tyree, and Deach. The name "Smashproof" is a play on the word "Bulletproof".

They are best known for the song "Brother", in which they show their version of what is going on in South Auckland. It spent eleven consecutive weeks at number one on the New Zealand RIANZ singles chart in 2009. The song features singer Gin Wigmore.

Their first release came in 2005, with the Juse-produced "Ride Til' I Die", which gained club play across New Zealand and Australia. The group released their debut album The Weekend on 23 March 2009 and have gone on to have three consecutive top twenty singles on the New Zealand Singles Chart.

In 2009, Smashproof toured throughout the country performing at secondary schools to raise funds for Samoan tsunami relief. The group has toured with the American rap artist Jay-Z.

== Discography ==
=== Albums ===
Year	Title	NZ chart
2009	The Weekend: Released: 23 March; Label: Move The Crowd	3

=== Singles ===
Year	Title	NZ chart	Album	Certification	Sales
2009	"Brother" (featuring Gin Wigmore)	1	The Weekend	2× Platinum	30,000+
2009	"It's Friday"	18	The Weekend		
2009	"Ordinary Life"	7	The Weekend	Gold	7,500+

=== Music videos ===
Year	Title	Director
2009	"Brother"	Chris Graham
2009	"It's Friday"	
2009	"Ordinary Life"	Andrew Morton
