= Holy Smoke (Gin Wigmore album) =

Studio album by Gin Wigmore
- Released: 25 September 2009
- Recorded: Los Angeles, California, U.S.
- Genre: Pop
- Length: 37:43
- Label: Universal
- Producer: Mike Elizondo

Gin Wigmore chronology
Extended Play (2008)	Holy Smoke (2009)	Gravel & Wine (2011)

Singles from Holy Smoke
- 1. "Oh My" Released: July 2009; 2. "I Do" Released: November 2009; 3. "Hey Ho" Released: January 2010; 4. "Too Late for Lovers" Released: May 2010

Holy Smoke is the debut album from New Zealand pop singer Gin Wigmore, released under the mononym Gin. Singles released off the album included "Oh My", "I Do" and "Hey Ho". The Cardinals play on every track and backed Wigmore on her subsequent tour.

The album debuted at number one in New Zealand, and was certified Gold in its first week. The album was certified Platinum in its second week, selling over 15,000 copies. In September 2011, Home Improvement Retailer Lowe's began a new brand campaign featuring Wigmore's single "Don't Stop".

== Commercial performance ==
Holy Smoke debuted at number one on the New Zealand Albums Chart, then slowly fell down the chart, before topping the chart again in February 2010. It then regained the top spot in October 2010 due to the release of the Deluxe Edition. It then soon gained Quadruple Platinum status.

== Track listing ==
Holy Smoke track listing
No.	Title	Writer(s)	Length
1.	"Oh My"	Gin Wigmore	4:16
2.	"Hey Ho"	Wigmore, Dan Wilson	4:04
3.	"New Revolution"	Wigmore, Mike Elizondo	4:21
4.	"Don't Stop"	Wigmore, Elizondo	3:28
5.	"I Do"	Wigmore, Martin Terefe, Sacha Skarbek	4:07
6.	"Too Late for Lovers"	Wigmore, Elizondo	3:47
7.	"Mr. Freakshow"	Wigmore, Elizondo	3:50
8.	"One Last Look"	Wigmore, Elizondo	2:37
9.	"Golden Ship"	Wigmore	3:55
10.	"Dying Day"	Wigmore	3:14
Total length:			37:43

New Zealand and Australia iTunes Store digital bonus
No.	Title	Writer(s)	Length
11.	"Time Will Tell"	Wigmore, Mitchell Froom	3:28
12.	"Don't" (Pre-order only)	Wigmore	3:08
13.	"Stealing Happiness"	Wigmore	3:18

Deluxe edition bonus tracks
No.	Title	Writer(s)	Length
11.	"These Roses"	Wigmore	3:15
12.	"S.O.S."	Wigmore	3:01
13.	"Hallelujah"	Wigmore	3:31
14.	"Under My Skin"	Wigmore	2:49
15.	"Easy Come Easy Go"	Wigmore	3:01
16.	"Cocaine"	John Martyn	3:12
17.	"Chains"	Wigmore	3:28
18.	"Don't"	Wigmore	3:08
19.	"Stealing Happiness"	Wigmore	3:18
20.	"I Do" (Fat Freddy's Drop Mix)	Wigmore, Terefe, Skarbek
21.	"Somewhere Over the Rainbow"	Harold Arlen, Yip Harburg	3:18

Deluxe edition bonus DVD (Live at the Powerstation)
No.	Title	Length
1.	"Hey Ho"
2.	"New Revolution"
3.	"Don't Stop"
4.	"S.O.S."
5.	"Dying Day"
6.	"Golden Ship"
7.	"One Last Look"
8.	"Too Late For Lovers"
9.	"Hallelujah"
10.	"I Do"
11.	"These Roses"
12.	"Under My Skin"
13.	"Oh My"
14.	"Lucy Loo"
15.	"Mr. Freakshow"
16.	"Hey Ho" (Behind the Scenes)
17.	"Too Late for Lovers" (Behind the Scenes)

Note: Early tracklists for the deluxe edition mentioned another song called "No Reason" which ultimately did not make the final release.

== Personnel ==
Personnel credits adapted from the album's liner notes.

- Gin Wigmore – vocals (all tracks); Farfisa organ, keyboards, Moog bass, Omnichord, piano, ukulele (5)
- Stephanie Alexander – backing vocals (1–4, 6, 8, 9)
- Brent Arrowood – engineering assistance
- Steve Baccon – photography
- Stevie Blacke – string arrangements, strings (2, 3, 6, 9)
- Doyle Bramhall II – harmonica, slide guitar (1)
- Neal Casal – guitar (1–3, 7), acoustic guitar (9)
- Matt Chamberlain – drums (6)
- Joe Chiccarelli – engineering, mixing (all tracks)
- John Daversa – trumpet (2, 4)
- Debaser – design
- Mike Elizondo – production (1–10), guitar (1), bass (3, 4, 6, 8), keyboards (3, 4, 6); drums, percussion (4); piano (4, 10), programming (4, 8); acoustic guitar, electric guitar (6, 8); lap steel guitar (8), upright bass (10)
- Chris Feinstein – bass (1, 2, 7, 9), loops (5)
- Sharlotte Gibson – backing vocals (1–4, 6, 8, 9)
- Jon Graboff – guitar (1, 3, 7–9), fuzz guitar (2)
- Adam Hawkins – engineering (all tracks)
- Dorian Holley – backing vocals (2)
- Jolie Levine – project co-ordination and contracting
- Billy Mims – engineering assistance
- Brad Pemberton – drums (1–9), loops (5)
- Paul Smith – engineering assistance
- Zac Rae – organ (1, 6), Wurlitzer (1, 9), keyboards (2, 6, 7, 9, 10), B-3 (3, 9), tack piano (4), loops (5), piano (7), pump organ (10)

== Charts ==
Weekly chart performance for Holy Smoke
Chart (2009–2010)	Peak position
Australian Albums (ARIA)	68
New Zealand Albums (RMNZ)	1

== Certifications ==
Certifications for Holy Smoke
Region	Certification	Certified units/sales
New Zealand (RMNZ)	4× Platinum	60,000^{*}
^{*} Sales figures based on certification alone.

== Release history ==
Release history for Holy Smoke
Region	Date	Edition
Australia	25 September 2009	Standard
New Zealand	19 October 2009	Standard
United States	16 March 2010	Standard
New Zealand	4 October 2010	Deluxe

== See also ==
- List of number-one albums in 2010 (New Zealand)
