= Extended Play (Gin Wigmore EP) =

EP by Gin Wigmore
- Released: 2 August 2008
- Genre: Pop
- Length: 15:38
- Label: Universal
- Producer: Tony Buchen

Gin Wigmore chronology
Extended Play (2008)	Holy Smoke (2009)

Singles from Extended Play
- 1. "Under My Skin" Released: 2008

Extended Play is New Zealand singer Gin Wigmore's debut extended play release.

== Track listing ==
Extended Play track listing
No.	Title	Writer(s)	Length
1.	"These Roses"		3:15
2.	"S.O.S."		3:02
3.	"Hallelujah"	G. Wigmore	3:31
4.	"Under My Skin"		2:49
5.	"Easy Come Easy Go"		3:01
Total length:			15:38

== Charts ==
Chart performance for Extended Play
Chart (2008–2009)	Peak position
Australia (ARIA)	96
New Zealand (Recorded Music NZ)	10

== Certifications ==
Certifications for Extended Play
Region	Certification	Certified units/sales
New Zealand (RMNZ)	Platinum	15,000^{*}
^{*} Sales figures based on certification alone.
