= Brother (Smashproof song) =

Single by Smashproof featuring Gin Wigmore

from the album The Weekend
- Released: 5 January 2009 (NZ)
- Genre: Hip hop, electronica
- Length: 3:50
- Label: MTC, Universal
- Songwriters: Tautogia, Diamond, Fa'Afou, Kibulu, Gremillo

Smashproof singles chronology
"Brother" (2009)	"It's Friday" (2009)

Gin Wigmore singles chronology
"Under My Skin" (2008)	"Brother" (2009)	"Oh My" (2009)

"Brother" is a single by New Zealand hip hop group Smashproof, released in early 2009. The song features Gin Wigmore. It was made as a metaphor to life in South Auckland. The song debuted in New Zealand at number twenty-three on 26 January 2009, rising to number one in its fifth week. It stayed firmly at the top of the chart for eleven consecutive weeks. It also had minor notoriety in Germany, reaching number eighty-one on their national chart.

The song broke a 23-year-old record by clocking up the longest consecutive run at number-one by a local act on the New Zealand Singles Chart. The record was previously set by the America's Cup-themed single "Sailing Away" by All of Us, which spent nine consecutive weeks at the top in 1986.

The song's lyrics concern the January 2008 killing of alleged tagger Pihema Cameron in Manukau, New Zealand by Bruce Emery.

The song was certified 2× Platinum on 6 September 2009, selling over 30,000 copies. It stayed on the chart for twenty-nine weeks.

== Charts ==
Chart (2009/2010)	Peak position
German Singles Chart	81
New Zealand Singles Chart	1

=== Year-end charts ===
Chart (2009)	Position
New Zealand Singles Chart	2

== Certifications ==
Region	Certification	Certified units/sales
New Zealand (RMNZ)	5× Platinum	150,000^{‡}
^{‡} Sales+streaming figures based on certification alone.
