= The Brave Don't Run =

Studio album by Midnight Youth
- Released: 27 April 2009
- Recorded: 2007–2008
- Genre: Rock
- Label: Warner

Midnight Youth chronology
| The Brave Don't Run (2009) | World Comes Calling (2011) |

Singles from The Brave Don't Run
- 1. "The Letter" Released: 20 October 2008; 2. "All On Our Own" Released: April 2009; 3. "Learning to Fall" Released: June 2009; 4. "Cavalry" Released: 14 September 2009; 5. "Golden Love" Released: 14 December 2009

Professional ratings
Review scores
| Source | Rating |
|---|---|
| New Zealand Herald | 3/5 stars |
| Stuff.co.nz | 4/5 stars |

The Brave Don't Run is the debut album of rock band Midnight Youth, released on April 27, 2009 through Warner Music. The album debuted at number two on the New Zealand Album Chart on May 3, 2009, The album features two gold singles in NZ, featuring "The Letter" & "All On Our Own".

== Background ==
The album was recorded in studios in New York and Auckland.

== Album artwork ==
The Brave Don't Run album artwork was illustrated by Sam Yong. The album art is inspired by different elements from the songs within the album, but mainly the title track "Cavalry". The cover is a homage to the painting of Napoleon by Jacques-Louis David.

== Singles ==
- "The Letter": In October 2008, the first single to be lifted off the album was released. The single performed well on the radio and television and eventually reached number 20 on the New Zealand Singles Chart.
- "All On Our Own": In March 2009, the album's second single was released and debuted on the New Zealand Singles Chart at number 18. It peaked at number 6 on the chart.
- "Learning to Fall": Released in June 2009 as the third single.
- "Cavalry": Released in October 2009 as the fourth single.
- "Golden Love": The fifth single.

== Track listing ==
| No. | Title | Length |
|---|---|---|
| 1. | "Cavalry" | 5:22 |
| 2. | "All On Our Own" | 3:45 |
| 3. | "Dead Flowers" | 3:53 |
| 4. | "The Letter" | 3:34 |
| 5. | "Learning to Fall" | 3:49 |
| 6. | "Benjamin" | 4:05 |
| 7. | "Tijuana" | 4:17 |
| 8. | "Golden Love" | 4:01 |
| 9. | "Lonely Homes" | 4:40 |
| 10. | "Flash" | 4:39 |

== Charts ==
Chart performance for The Brave Don't Run
| Chart (2009–2011) | Peak position |
|---|---|
| Australian Albums (ARIA) | 83 |
| New Zealand Albums (RMNZ) | 2 |

== Certifications ==
| Region | Certification | Certified units/sales |
|---|---|---|
| New Zealand (RMNZ) | Platinum | 15,000^{^} |
^{^} Shipments figures based on certification alone.
