= Gin Wigmore =

New Zealand singer

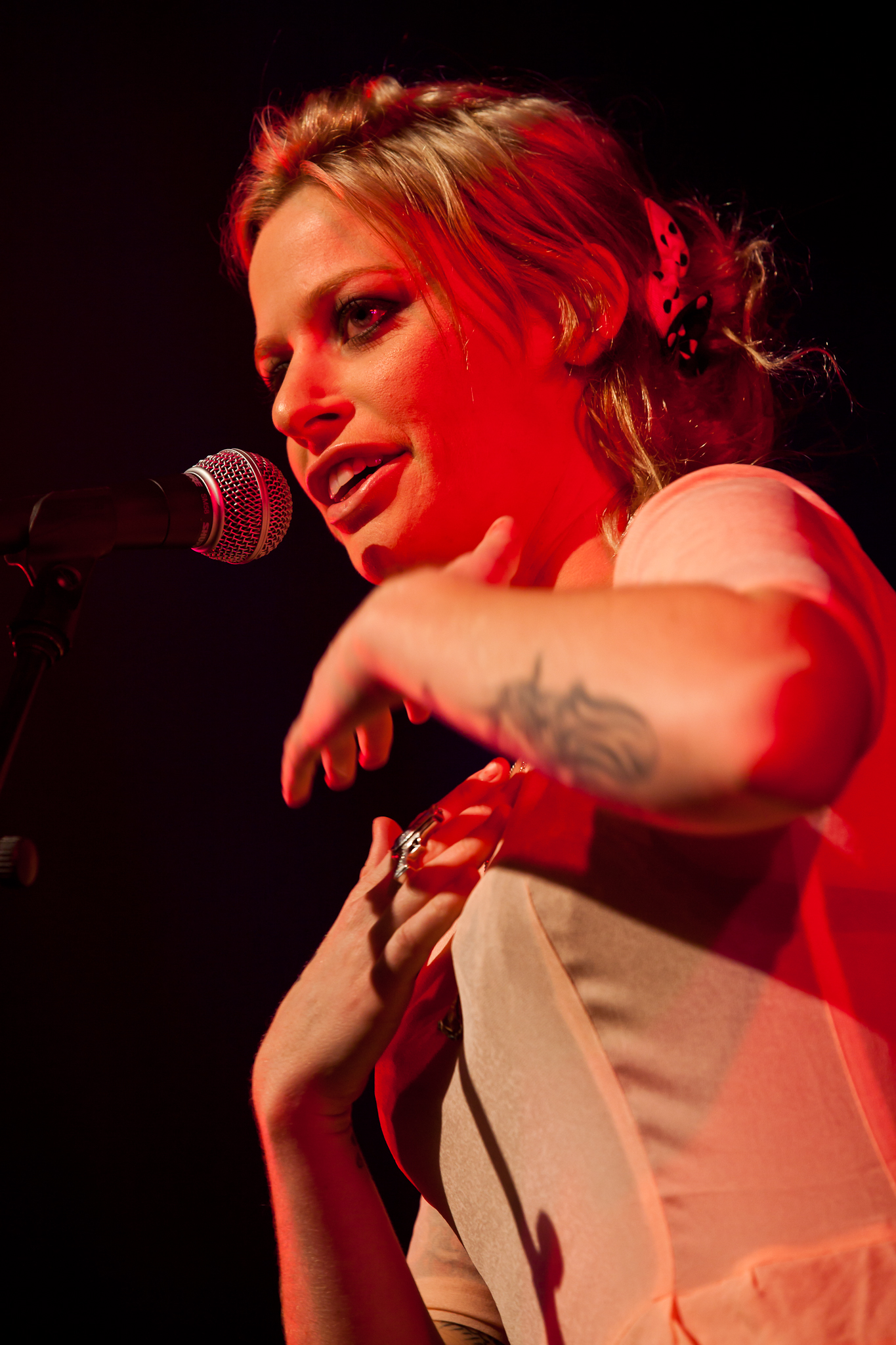
- Wigmore performing in 2010

Background information
- Born: Virginia Claire Wigmore; 6 June 1986 (age 40); Auckland, New Zealand
- Genres: Blues rock, pop rock, alternative rock
- Occupation: Singer-songwriter
- Instruments: Vocals, keyboards
- Years active: 2008–present
- Labels: Island, Dangerbird
- Website: www.ginwigmore.com

Virginia Claire Wigmore (born 6 June 1986) is a New Zealand singer and songwriter. Featured on the Smashproof single "Brother" in 2009, Wigmore went on to release five albums – Holy Smoke (2009), Gravel & Wine (2011), Blood to Bone (2015) Ivory (2018) and Beautiful Mess (2026) – with the first three having been chart-toppers on the New Zealand Albums Chart. She is known for her high pitched and raspy voice.

== Career ==
=== International Songwriting Competition ===
Inspired by David Gray's album White Ladder, Wigmore wrote her first song, "Angelfire", at the age of 14. Two years later her father died of cancer and Wigmore stopped writing and playing music. She went to Argentina on an exchange programme to teach at a kindergarten. On her return to New Zealand, she wrote "Hallelujah", a tribute to her father. Her sister entered the song in the US-based International Songwriting Competition in 2004, and Wigmore beat 11,000 songwriting aspirants from 77 countries to become the youngest and only unsigned Grand Prize winner in the history of the competition. She also won the Teen category with "Angelfire".

Hallelujah was my way of telling my family I had dealt with dad's passing and honestly, I didn't want to share these feelings with anyone else. I wanted the moment for myself and my family.

— Gin Wigmore

=== 2008: career beginnings and Extended Play ===
Extended Play was Wigmore's first EP. It was produced by Tony Buchen (Blue King Brown, The Whitlams, Macromantics, Kid Confucius) and contains the tracks "Hallelujah", "These Roses", "SOS", "Under My Skin", and "Easy Come Easy Go". Australian musician John Butler played ukulele on the song "SOS". Released in 2008, the EP peaked at number ten in the New Zealand charts. It was certified Platinum in New Zealand on 2 May 2010, selling over 15,000 copies.

Extended Play was released in Australia on 2 August 2008 by Island Records. Wigmore was the first artist signed with Island Records, a partner company with Universal Music Group, Australia. She toured with Australian artist Pete Murray on his national tour in August/September 2008. Wigmore toured in 2008, including at the Cross Town Revue in Auckland, and in December 2008, toured with musicians John Mellencamp and Sheryl Crow in New Zealand. Her hit single "Under My Skin" was featured on an Air New Zealand advertising campaign, Nothing to Hide.

Wigmore was featured in the 2009 song and video of "Brother" by a new group Smashproof, also from Auckland.

=== 2009: Holy Smoke ===
In 2009, Wigmore released her debut full-length album Holy Smoke, recorded with The Cardinals of Ryan Adams & the Cardinals fame. The first single from the album, "Oh My", debuted on the New Zealand Singles Chart at number twenty-one on 24 August 2009, moving to number seven the following week. It peaked at number four.

Three other singles were released during 2010, "I Do" charted at no. 14 on the Official New Zealand Singles Chart, while the third single "Hey Ho" missed out on a top 20 position by charting just outside at no. 21. The fourth single taken from Holy Smoke was "Too Late For Lovers", and despite hitting no. 3 on the NZ40 Airplay chart, the single failed to crack the national Top 40. During the week of 30 May 2010, all four of Wigmore's singles from Holy Smoke appeared on the NZ40 Airplay Chart, 'Too Late For Lovers' #7, 'Oh My' #23, 'Hey Ho' #24, 'I Do' #37.

The single "Oh My" was the theme track for the series The Almighty Johnsons. Wigmore's single "Hey Ho" appeared during the closing scenes of the Weeds Season 6 Finale. In September 2011, Home Improvement Retailer Lowe's began a new brand campaign featuring Wigmore's single "Don't Stop". Her song "Stealing Happiness" appeared in the TV movie "Tangiwai".

=== 2011 - 2013: Gravel & Wine ===
Wigmore travelled for two months in Mississippi and Alabama to get a Southern United States inspiration for her second album which would be recorded in California under producer Butch Walker. In September 2011, Wigmore revealed the title and release of her new album Gravel & Wine on her official Facebook page. The first single "Black Sheep" was released 26 September 2011, debuting at #13 in the Official New Zealand Music Chart. The album was released on 7 November 2011. It debuted atop the New Zealand charts, and at #29 on the Australian Albums Chart. Wigmore also released music videos for "Man Like That" and "If Only".

"Black Sheep" appeared in episode 12, season 8 of television series Grey's Anatomy, in episode 2, season 2 of Teen Wolf, in episode 5, season 5 of The Good Wife, and in episode 1 season 1 of Wynonna Earp. She appeared singing it on Gift of Revenge, a segment of ABC's television show Revenge season 2, episode 7. The song was also used in television commercials for Guinness Black Lager and Nissan Rogue Midnight Edition (2017) in the United States.

"Kill of the Night" was also featured during season 2 of Teen Wolf, along with the series Pretty Little Liars and 666 Park Avenue, and AMC during its annual airing of Halloween movies and shows titled FearFest. The track was also the theme song to the 2016 E4 and Netflix mini series Crazyhead. Commercials with the song include Alfa Romeo in Australia, Nationwide Insurance in the United States, and a worldwide short by Johnnie Walker. The track also appeared in episode 6, season 1 of The Umbrella Academy.

Wigmore was featured in a Skyfall tie-in commercial from Heineken performing the song "Man Like That", which also featured James Bond portrayer Daniel Craig and Bond girl Bérénice Marlohe.

Gravel & Wine was released in the U.S. on 2 April 2013, and Wigmore appeared on the entire 2013 Vans Warped Tour.

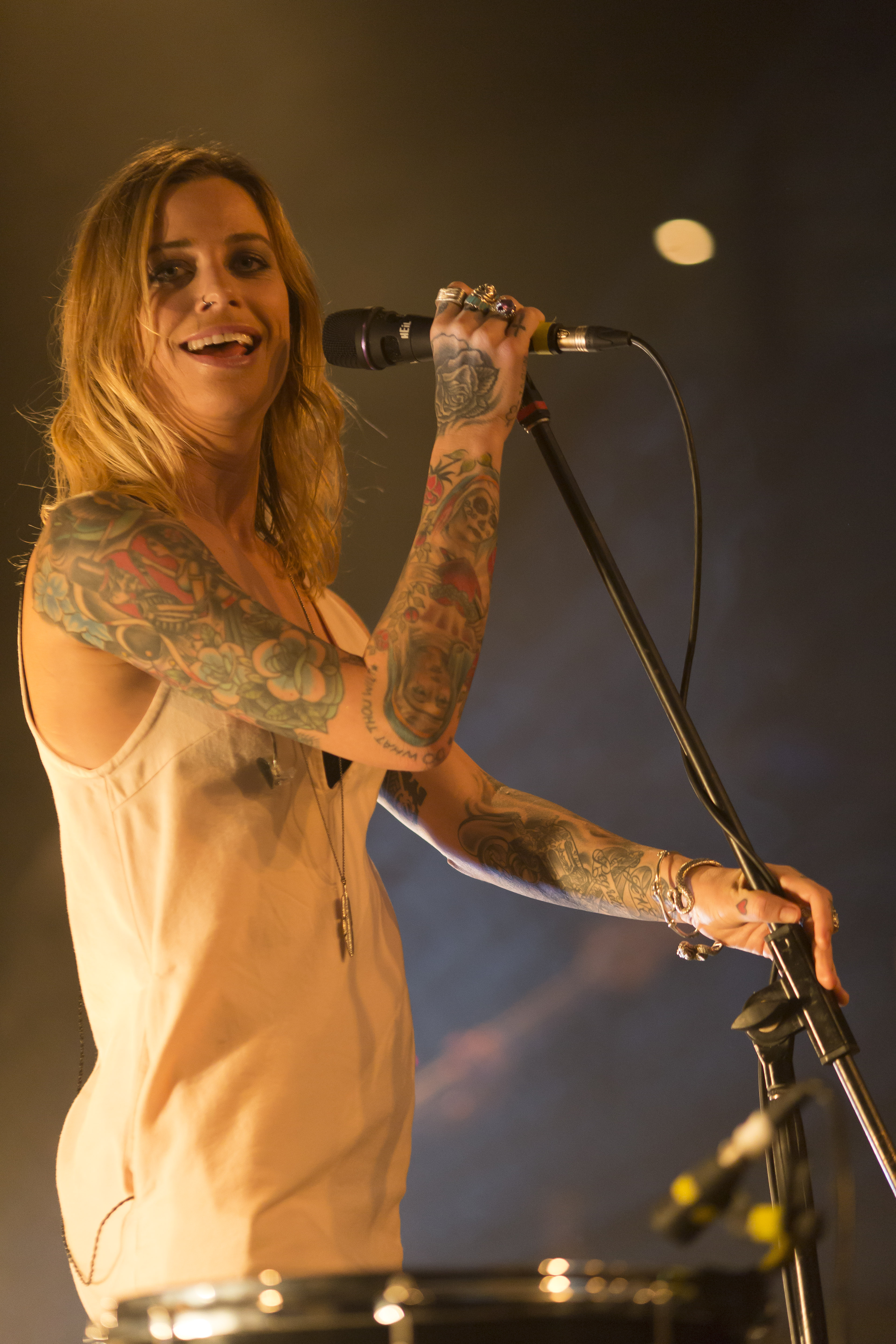
Gin Wigmore performing in 2015

=== 2014 and 2015: Blood to Bone ===
On 14 August 2014, Wigmore had confirmed she had begun studio production on her third LP. Throughout 15 to 22 August, Wigmore had worked in West Hollywood. But on 25 August 2014, Wigmore posted a picture of the beginning of her thirteen-day studio work at Blakeslee Recording Studios in North Hollywood, California. Stephen Rusch is engineering the album. On 29 January 2015, Wigmore posted the album cover and title of her the third LP, Blood to Bone, which was scheduled for release by Island Records on 26 June 2015. It was Wigmore's third straight chart-topper in New Zealand, and also debuted at #13 at the ARIA Charts, her biggest Australian performance. In the United States, Blood to Bone came out in August, and entered the Billboard Alternative Albums chart the following month. Her song "New Rush" was featured on the soundtrack of FIFA 16. On 6 June 2015, she released a new promotional single entitled "Willing To Die" featuring the American rapper Logic & the Australian rapper Suffa of The Hilltop Hoods. The song samples the Alan Lomax recording "Rosie", which David Guetta also sampled on his track "Hey Mama", released in March 2015.

=== 2016 - 2018: pregnancy and Ivory ===
On 2 September 2016, Wigmore announced on Facebook she had begun work on her fourth studio album. Later on 3 November, Wigmore dropped "Dirty Mercy", the lead single from her upcoming fourth album, which she had expected to release in 2017. Wigmore said that she started working in May, and soon came up with ten new songs, while described the album as "a very eclectic mash of styles as I seem to struggle at settling for one particular genre of music with my albums." Also in November, Wigmore started another North American tour, beginning at the Corona Capital festival in Mexico City, and extending to cities in the United States up until December.

In 2017, she was a presenter at TEDxScottBase, filmed in New Zealand's Antarctic research facility. There Wigmore revealed another new song, "Thoughts of You".

On 26 June, Wigmore released the album's second single "Hallow Fate". The song was inspired by an artist's individuality in the music industry. Later in the summer she released the promotional single, "Beatnik Trip"

On 16 November, Wigmore released the promotional single "Cabrona", along with the announcement that her fourth album was titled Ivory. Released in April 2018, the album was named after Wigmore's son, even if all the songs were written prior to his birth.

=== 2018 - 2025: other projects and standalone singles ===
In addition, Gin has collaborated with Air New Zealand, with songs such as "Tomorrow" on the "Where to Next" ad campaign; her hit single, "Under My Skin", for their "Nothing to Hide" campaign; and, most recently, her rendition of "My Little Corner of the World" on the "a Fantastical Journey" flight safety video in 2017.

In 2020, Gin released 3 standalone songs online and streaming. “Hangover Halo” and “Feels Like Me” during spring. During the summer, she released two acoustic versions of the songs titled the “Naked Editions”. Her last release of the year was another song called, “HBIC”.

In 2021 she released two songs, “Woman” and “Hand Over Heart”. The latter single was dedicated to Wigmore’s deceased dog, Indiana.

During 2023, Wigmore released two more standalone songs, “Somebody’s Gonna Die Tonight” and “Sugar Like That”.

=== 2026: Beautiful Mess ===
In April 2026, Wigmore announced her fifth record, Beautiful Mess was inspired by her divorce with Jason Aalon Butler. To support the project, she released the singles "Country Diamond" on 30 April 2026, followed by the title track on 5 May and "Rodeo" on 12 June 2026.

== Personal life ==
Wigmore was born in Auckland to Peter and Adrienne Wigmore. She has two older siblings, including Lucy Wigmore. She married Jason Butler, lead singer of the band Letlive and currently lead singer of Fever 333, during a private ceremony in Hawaii in September 2014. The couple's first child was born in 2017. Their second son in 2020. As of 2026, the couple has divorced.

Wigmore is vegetarian and, in 2015, was shortlisted for SAFE's "New Zealand's Hottest Vegetarians" award.

Wigmore and her husband reside in Palm Springs, California, US, where they operate a boutique hotel.

== Tours ==
- Tour with Jimmy Barnes (2009)
- Holy Smoke Tour (2010)
- The Grave Train National Tour (2010)
- Gin Wigmore (2011)
- The Winery Tour (2012)
- Vans Warped Tour – United States (2013)
- Homegrown Festival NZ (2014)
- New Rush NZ Tour (2015)
- Blood to Bone Tour (2015)
- Willing to Die U.S. Tour (2016)
- Let it Ride U.S. Tour (2016)
- Ivory U.S. Tour (2018)
- Ivory NZ Tour (2019)
- Gin Wigmore with Tami Neilson and Hollie Smith — New Zealand (2020)
- Summer Concert Tour NZ (2021)
- Peachy Keen Festival (2021)

== Discography ==
Gin Wigmore discography
- Studio albums: 5
- Extended plays: 3
- Singles: 6
- Music videos: 8
- Commercials: 1

=== Studio albums ===
List of studio albums, with selected details, chart positions and certifications
| Title | Details | Peak chart positions | | | | | Certifications (sales thresholds) |
| Title | Details | NZ | AUS | AUT | SWI | US | Certifications (sales thresholds) |
|---|---|---|---|---|---|---|---|
| Holy Smoke | Released: 25 September 2009; Label: Universal; Format: Digital download, CD | 1 | 69 | — | — | — | RMNZ: 4× Platinum |
| Gravel & Wine | Released: 7 November 2011; Label: Universal; Format: Digital download, CD | 1 | 29 | 65 | 60 | 84 | RMNZ: 2× Platinum |
| Blood to Bone | Released: 26 June 2015; Label: Universal; Format: Digital download, CD | 1 | 13 | — | — | — | |
| Ivory | Released: 6 April 2018; Label: Island Records Australia; Format: Digital download, CD, LP | 11 | 74 | — | — | — | |
| Beautiful Mess | Released: 17 July 2026; Label: Gin Wigmore, Universal; Format: Digital download, CD | 5 | — | — | — | — | |

=== Extended plays ===
List of extended plays, with selected details and chart positions
| Title | Details | Peak chart positions | | | Certifications (sales thresholds) |
| Title | Details | NZ | AUS | US Heat | Certifications (sales thresholds) |
|---|---|---|---|---|---|
| Extended Play | Released: 2 August 2008; Label: Universal; Format: Digital download, CD | 10 | 96 | — | RMNZ: Platinum |
| iTunes Session | Released: 19 March 2010; Label: Universal; Format: Digital download | — | — | — | |
| Man Like That | Released 30 October 2012 (US); Label: Universal; Format: Digital download | — | — | 8 | |
| Rattle My Grave | Released: 27 October 2023; Label: UMG Recordings; Format: Digital download | — | — | — | |

"—" denotes releases that did not chart or were not released in that territory.

=== Singles ===
List of singles, with selected chart positions and certifications
| Title | Year | Peak chart positions | | | Certifications (sales thresholds) | Album |
| Title | Year | NZ | AUS | SWI | Certifications (sales thresholds) | Album |
|---|---|---|---|---|---|---|
| "These Roses" | 2008 | — | — | — | | Extended Play |
| "Oh My" | 2009 | 4 | — | — | RMNZ: Platinum | Holy Smoke |
| "I Do" | 2009 | 14 | — | — | RMNZ: Gold | Holy Smoke |
| "Hey Ho" | 2010 | 21 | — | — | | Holy Smoke |
| "Too Late for Lovers" | 2010 | — | — | — | | Holy Smoke |
| "Black Sheep" | 2011 | 13 | — | 62 | | Gravel & Wine |
| "Don't Stop" | 2012 | — | — | — | | Gravel & Wine |
| "Man Like That" | 2012 | — | — | — | | Gravel & Wine |
| "Devil in Me" | 2012 | — | — | — | | Gravel & Wine |
| "New Rush" | 2015 | 39 | — | — | | Blood to Bone |
| "Willing to Die" (featuring Logic and Suffa) | 2015 | — | 88 | — | | Blood to Bone |
| "Dirty Mercy" | 2016 | — | — | — | | Ivory |
| "Hallow Fate" | 2017 | — (Note: "Hallow Fate" did not enter the NZ Top 40 Singles Chart, but peaked at number eight on the NZ Heatseekers Singles Chart.) | — | — | | Ivory |
| "Hangover Halo" | 2020 | — | — | — | | Non-album singles |
| "Feels Like Me" | 2020 | — | — | — | | Non-album singles |
| "Woman" | 2021 | — | — | — | | Non-album singles |
| "Someone's Gonna Die Tonight" | 2023 | — | — | — | | Non-album singles |
| "Sugar Like That" | 2023 | — | — | — | | Non-album singles |
| "Country Diamond" | 2026 | — (Note: "Country Diamond" did not enter the NZ Top 40 Singles Chart, but it peaked at number 39 on the NZ Hot Singles Chart.) | — | — | | Beautiful Mess |
| "Beautiful Mess" | 2026 | — | — | — | | Beautiful Mess |
| "Rodeo" | 2026 | — | — | — | | Beautiful Mess |
| "Tip of My Tongue" | 2026 | — (Note: "Tip of My Tongue" did not enter the NZ Top 40 Singles Chart, but it peaked at number 23 on the NZ Hot Singles Chart.) | — | — | | Beautiful Mess |
| "Rush" (with Emerson) | 2026 | — | — | — | | |

==== As featured artist ====
| Year | Title | NZ | Certifications (sales thresholds) | Album |
|---|---|---|---|---|
| 2009 | "Brother" (with Smashproof) | 1 | NZ: 2× Platinum | The Weekend |
| 2015 | "Team, Ball, Player, Thing" (#KiwisCureBatten featuring Lorde, Kimbra, Brooke Fraser, et al.) | 2 | | Non-album single |
| 2021 | "Silent (Spooky) Night" (King Carol featuring Gin Wigmore) | | | Non-album single |
| 2021 | "Christmas Party" (King Carol featuring Gin Wigmore) | | | Non-album single |
| 2026 | "Prophecy" (Sān-Z · HOYO-MiX (feat. Gin Wigmore)) | | | Soundtrack for ZZZ 2nd anniversary |

=== Music videos ===
| Year | Title | Director(s) |
|---|---|---|
| 2008 | "These Roses" | Special Problems |
| 2008 | "Under My Skin" | Special Problems |
| 2008 | "S.O.S." | Dan Reisinger |
| 2009 | "Brother" | Chris Graham |
| 2009 | "Oh My" | Stuart Gosling |
| 2009 | "I Do" | Gemma Lee |
| 2010 | "Hey Ho" | Moh Azima |
| 2010 | "Too Late for Lovers" | Moh Azima |
| 2011 | "Black Sheep" | Sean Gilligan |
| 2012 | "Man Like That" | Sean Gilligan |
| 2012 | "If Only" | Sean Gilligan |
| 2015 | "New Rush" | Zachariah de Cairo |
| 2015 | "Written in the Water" | Zachariah de Cairo |
| 2016 | "Willing to Die" | Lucy Wigmore |
| 2016 | "Dirty Mercy" | David De Lautour & Gin Wigmore |
| 2016 | "Cabrona" | Unknown |
| 2023 | “Hand Over Heart” | Self-Directed |
| 2026 | ”Country Diamond” | Lucy Wigmore |

== Awards and nominations ==
| Year | Type | Award | Result |
|---|---|---|---|
| 2009 | New Zealand Music Awards | Vodafone Single of the Year ("Brother") (Smashproof featuring Gin Wigmore) | Nominated |
| 2009 | New Zealand Music Awards | Highest Selling Single ("Brother") (Smashproof featuring Gin Wigmore) | Won |
| 2010 | New Zealand Music Awards | Vodafone's People's Choice Award | Nominated |
| 2010 | New Zealand Music Awards | Mazda Best Female Solo Artist | Nominated |
| 2010 | New Zealand Music Awards | Vodafone Single of the Year ("Oh My") | Nominated |
| 2010 | New Zealand Music Awards | Best Pop Album | Won |
| 2010 | New Zealand Music Awards | Vodafone Album of The Year ("Holy Smoke") | Won |
| 2010 | New Zealand Music Awards | Breakthrough Artist Of The Year | Won |
| 2010 | New Zealand Music Awards | Highest Selling Album Holy Smoke | Won |
| 2012 | New Zealand Music Awards | Vodafone's Single of the Year ("Black Sheep") | Nominated |
| 2012 | New Zealand Music Awards | Best Female Solo Artist | Nominated |
| 2012 | New Zealand Music Awards | Best Pop Album (Gravel & Wine) | Nominated |
| 2012 | New Zealand Music Awards | Vodafone's People's Choice Award | Nominated |
| 2012 | MTV Europe Music Awards | Best Australia & New Zealand Act | Nominated |
| 2015 | New Zealand Music Awards | Best Female Solo Artist (Blood to Bone) | Won |
| 2015 | MTV Europe Music Awards | Best New Zealand Act | Nominated |
