= Midnight Youth =

New Zealand rock band

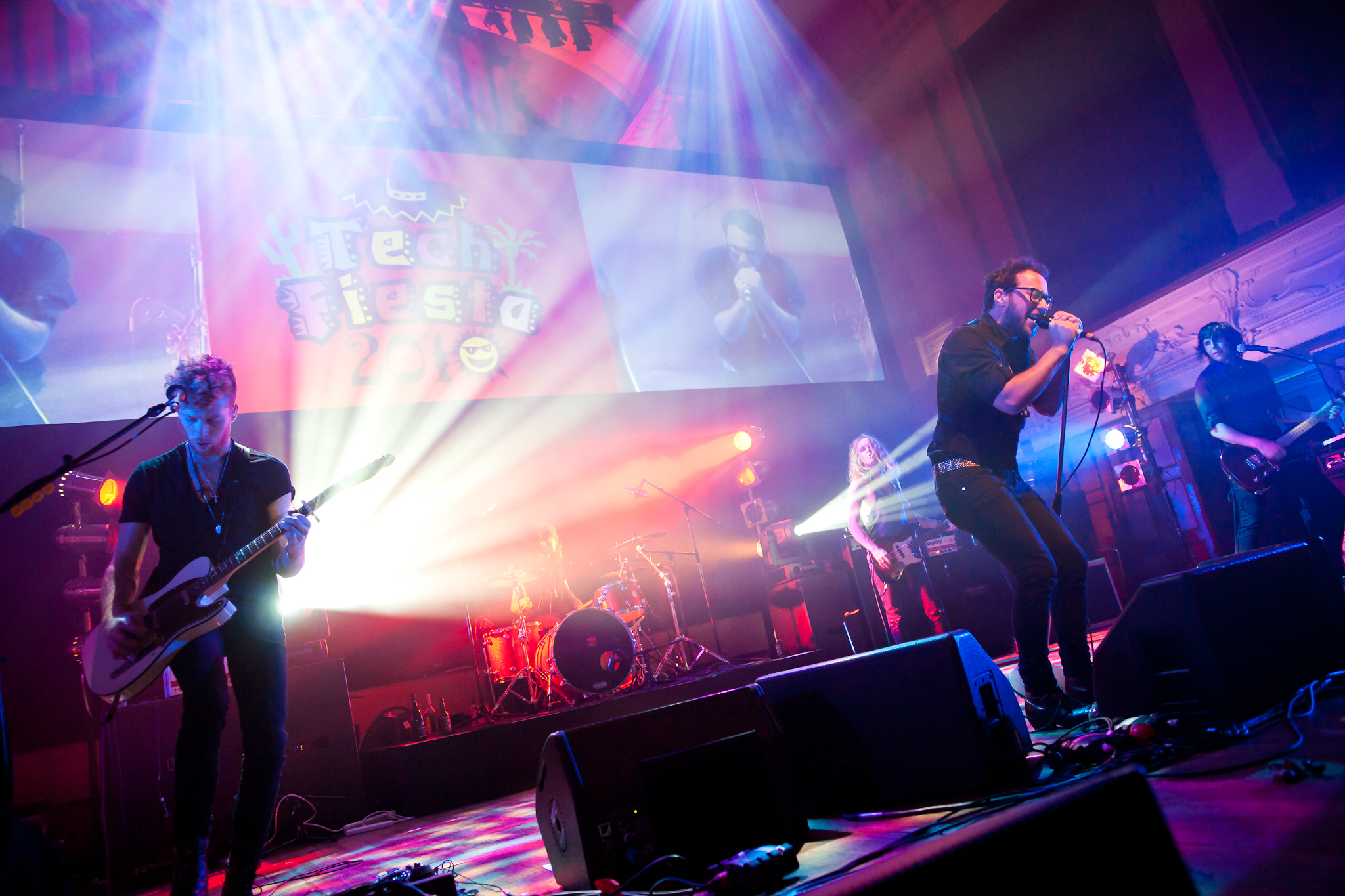

Background information
- Origin: Auckland, New Zealand
- Genre: Rock
- Occupation: Music
- Years active: 2006–2013, 2020
- Labels: Warner Music (New Zealand only), Unsigned ROW
- Past members: Jeremy Redmore; Simon Oscroft; Nick Campbell; Matt Warman; Aidan Bartlett
- Website: http://www.midnightyouth.com

Midnight Youth were a New Zealand rock band formed in 2006. Their debut album, The Brave Don't Run, was released in 2009 in New Zealand and Australia. The band subsequently toured and played festivals across Australasia, the United States and Asia. Their second and last studio album, World Comes Calling, was released in October 2011. They played their last show on 2 March 2013.

== History ==
=== Early beginnings ===
Midnight Youth came together while at Rangitoto College in Auckland's North Shore with three members of the band playing together in New Zealand's high school Rockquest competition. Jeremy Redmore and Nick Campbell completed the group in mid-2006.

The band released two independent singles, "Supernatural" and "A New Day", in 2007 and played opening slots for Incubus, OK Go and a re-formed INXS in their New Zealand shows.

In 2008 they self-funded a trip to New York City to lodge and record with producer Terence Dover. With Hotbed Studios (vocals and bass) as their quarters and home base, Dover recorded them at studios across New York. Skyline Studios (drums) in Manhattan, GödelString (guitars, drums, vocals, bass) in Brooklyn, The Buddy Project (guitars and vocals) in Queens and (Grand Piano) City College's Sonic Arts Center concert hall were all unique recording environments Dover selected for their debut record The Brave Don't Run.

=== Signing & debut album ===
After recording the album, the band signed with Warner Music NZ in September 2008 and released their third single, "The Letter", to widespread acclaim across New Zealand. The song became the band's first Top 40 hit in New Zealand in January 2009, eventually peaking at #19 on the NZ singles chart and spending 17 weeks in total inside the NZ Top 40.

Their follow-up single, "All On Our Own", debuted at #18 on the New Zealand RIANZ Singles Chart in March, 2009, and peaked at number six, after twelve weeks on the chart. The song went on to spend another 11 weeks inside the NZ top 40 and beat out international acts to be the most-played song on NZ radio for 2009.

The album spawned five singles in New Zealand in total: third single "Learning To Fall" was released in June 2009, its video filmed in Manhattan, New York, fourth single "Cavalry" spent seven straight weeks at number one on rock radio in New Zealand.

The fifth single, "Golden Love", initially gave the band exposure in the United States through a feature on the season finale of One Tree Hill in May 2010 before going on to have a second life after being featured in Korean TV drama Uncontrollably Fond in 2016. As of July 2018, the song has amassed over 8 million streams between Spotify and YouTube.

Midnight Youth's debut album, The Brave Don't Run, was released in New Zealand on 27 April 2009, and peaked at number two on the New Zealand Album Chart. The album was certified platinum in New Zealand in December 2009.

Midnight Youth were nominated for eight awards in the 2009 New Zealand Music Awards, including Best Album (The Brave Don't Run), Best Single ("All On Our Own") and Best Group. The band won the Best Rock Album award, Best Group award and Best Engineer Andrew Buckton.

The band gained a reputation as a top-performing festival act after playing sets at SXSW, Big Day Out, Musexpo, One Movement, Sounds of Spring, and Rhythm and Vines.

On 9 September 2011 they performed as the supporting act to Neil and Tim Finn at the opening of the 2011 Rugby World Cup waterfront stadium.

=== Split ===
On 6 September 2012 lead singer Jeremy Redmore announced that he had quit the band to pursue a solo career. On 1 March 2013 the band announced they would play their last-ever show on 2 March at Home Grown via its Facebook page.

== Discography ==
Midnight Youth discography
- Studio albums: 2
- Extended plays: 2
- Singles: 11
- Music videos: 12

=== Albums ===
| Title | Details | Peak chart positions | |
| Title | Details | NZ | AUS |
|---|---|---|---|
| The Brave Don't Run | Released: 24 April 2009; Label: Warner Music NZ; Catalogue: 5186539152 | 2 | 83 |
| World Comes Calling | Released: 24 October 2011; Label: Warner Music NZ; Catalogue: 5249889172 | 4 | — |
"—" denotes a recording that did not chart or was not released in that territory.

=== EPs ===
| Title | Details |
|---|---|
| ZM Live Lounge: Midnight Youth | Released: 2009; Label: Warner Music NZ |
| Just for Once | Released: 27 September 2010; Label: Warner Music NZ |

=== Singles ===
| Year | Title | Peak chart positions | Album |
| Year | Title | NZ | Album |
|---|---|---|---|
| 2006 | "Supernatural" | — | Non-album singles |
| 2007 | "A New Day" | — | Non-album singles |
| 2008 | "Supernatural" (Tim Phin & Midnight Youth) | — | Non-album singles |
| 2008 | "The Letter" | 19 | The Brave Don't Run |
| 2009 | "Learning to Fall" | — | The Brave Don't Run |
| 2009 | "Cavalry" | — | The Brave Don't Run |
| 2009 | "Golden Love" | — | The Brave Don't Run |
| 2010 | "All On Our Own" | 6 | The Brave Don't Run |
| 2010 | "Just For Once" | — | Non-album single |
| 2011 | "Who Said You're Free" | — | World Comes Calling |
| 2011 | "World Comes Calling" | — | World Comes Calling |
"—" denotes a recording that did not chart or was not released in that territory.

=== Music videos ===
| Year | Song | Director | Ref. |
|---|---|---|---|
| 2006 | "Supernatural" | Scott Boswell | |
| 2007 | "A New Day" | Scott Boswell | |
| 2008 | "The Letter" | Stephen Tolfrey | |
| 2009 | "All On Our Own" (Version 1) | Zac Blair | |
| 2009 | "All On Our Own" (Version 2) | Michael Braid/Midnight Youth | |
| 2009 | "Learning To Fall" | Guy Quinlan | |
| 2009 | "Cavalry" | Michael Humphrey | |
| 2009 | "Golden Love" | | |
| 2010 | "All On Our Own" (Version 3) | Tim van Dammen | |
| 2010 | "Just For Once" | Tim van Dammen | |
| 2011 | "Who Said You're Free" | Anthony Plant | |
| 2011 | "World Comes Calling" | Michael Humphrey | |

== The band ==
=== Current members ===
- Simon Oscroft (Lead guitar/Backing Vocals)
- Nick Campbell (Keyboard/Rhythm Guitar)
- Matt Warman (Bass)
- Aidan Bartlett (Drums)

=== Past members ===
- Jeremy Redmore (Lead vocals)
