= Zwarte Cross =

Dutch music and motocross festival

Coordinates: 52°00′07″N 6°35′58″E

Zwarte Cross Festival
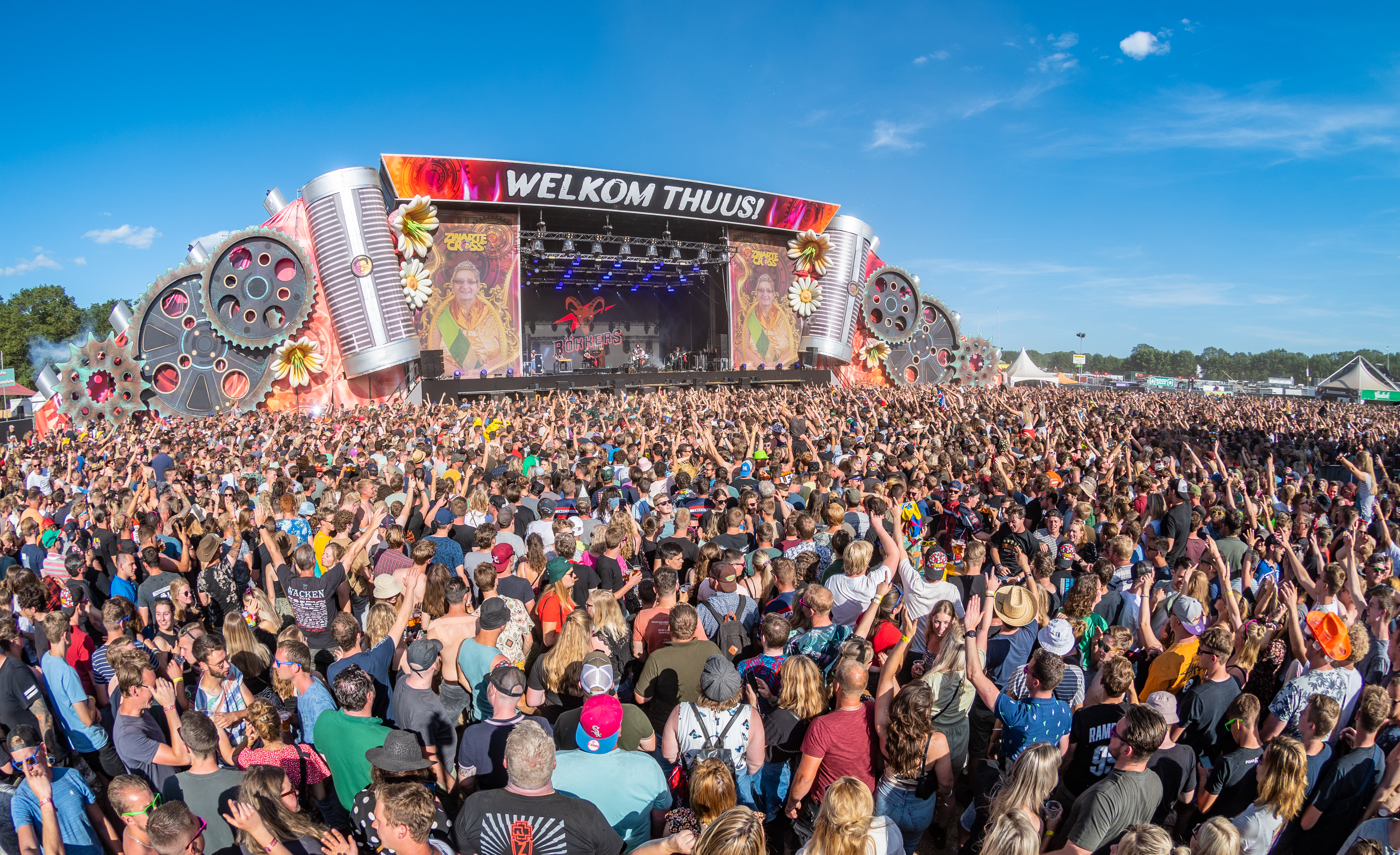
- Main stage in 2022
- Genre: Rock
- Dates: 12 July 2018–15 July 2018
- Locations: Lichtenvoorde, Netherlands
- Years active: 1997–present
- Website: http://www.zwartecross.nl

The Zwarte Cross Festival is the largest paid festival in the Netherlands, and the largest motor event in the world. The 20th edition in 2016 numbered 220,000 visitors, the 26th edition in 2024 did count for 265,500 guests. The festival is a combination of motocross, music, theatre and stunts. 'Zwarte Cross' literally means 'black cross'; it is a reference to the illegal motocross races in the 1960s. The organisation is in the hands of Dutch firm De Feestfabriek Alles Komt Goed B.V., sold in 2021 to Superstruct Entertainment, which in 2024 was acquired by U.S. investment firm KKR & Co.

== History ==
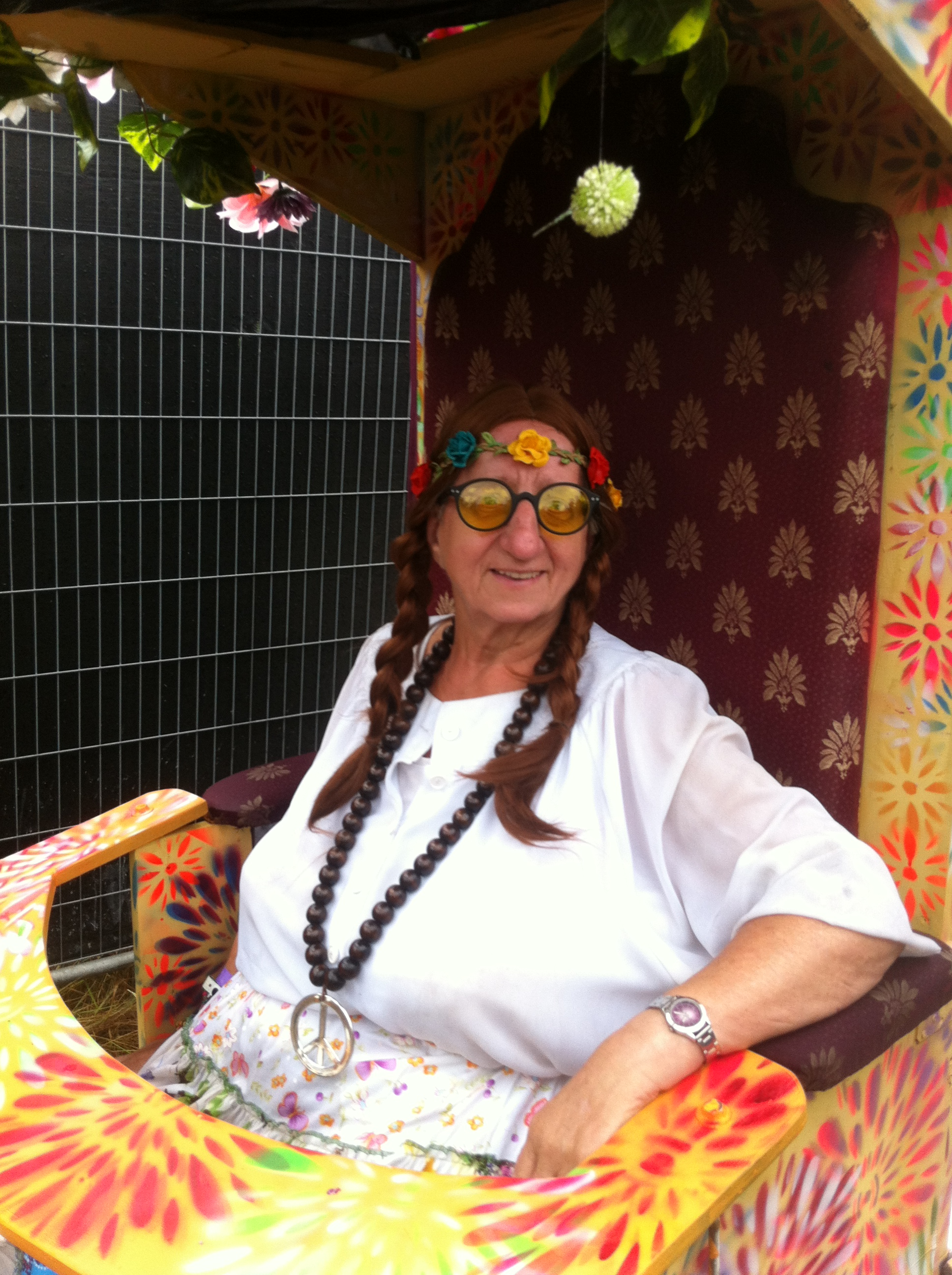
Aunt Rikie

The first edition of the 'official' Zwarte Cross took place in 1997 in Hummelo, region De Achterhoek. It was a motocross in which anyone could compete on a motorcycle, moped or scooter. The day was concluded with a concert of local rock band Jovink & De Voederbietels in which two of the organisers did play. Although the name suggested the race was illegal, the organisation had all necessary permits. About 150 people competed, and there were 1000 visitors.

The festival proved to be successful, the second edition had 350 competitors, and 4000 visitors, but a lot of people got injured. Therefore, the organisation decided to cooperate with a professional motocross club, HALMAC, in Halle. The third edition, with a duration of three days, was held on their official Grand Prix circuit. Visitors could stay overnight at the festival campsite.

In 2007, the festival moved to Lichtenvoorde.

The mascot and logo of the Zwarte Cross is 'Tante Rikie', Rikie Nijman, the mother of Jovink's manager, André Nijman. She is the unofficial festival CEO and is well-known by the visitors. During the festival, she is carried around in a sedan chair, and visitors kneel for her.

== Editions ==
=== 2010 ===
The 14th edition took place 15 July - 18 July. Performing bands were: Airbourne, Band Zonder Banaan, The Baseballs, Big Shampoo and the Hairstylers, Black Spiders, Caro Emerald, Coparck, DeWolff, Di-rect, Jon Oliva's Pain, Guus Meeuwis, Kamelot, K's Choice, Mala Vita, Marike Jager, Moss. 148,000 people visited the festival.

On 12 July, only a few days before the festival, a storm hit the festival-terrain. 4 people were injured. All of the already built tents were blown over, some destroyed. The damage was over 1 million euro. The scenery of the mega-tent (the biggest on the terrain, was replaced by an outdoor-stage. Saturday 17 July, an employee of a fairground attraction was killed in an accident, while testing the ride.

=== 2011 ===
The 15th edition had 152,500 visitors. Some of the bands performing were: Blondie, Anthrax, Disabuse, Ilse de Lange, Jacqueline Govaert, Life of Agony, Miss Montreal, the Black Crowes, Helloween, Sepultura, Vanderbuyst, De Staat, Go Back to the Zoo and Annihilator. About 150 bands played on 20 stages.

=== 2012 ===
The 16th edition took place from 20 July - 22 July. The registration for competitors was closed in a record time, within ten minutes. Some of the bands were: Kaiser Chiefs, Within Temptation, DeWolff and Direct.

=== 2020-2021 ===
Editions 2020 and 2021 were not held because of the COVID-19 pandemic.

=== 2022 ===
The 2022 edition was held from 15 to 17 July. Main acts at this 24th edition were Dropkick Murphys, Kensington, Claw Boys Claw and Katchafire.

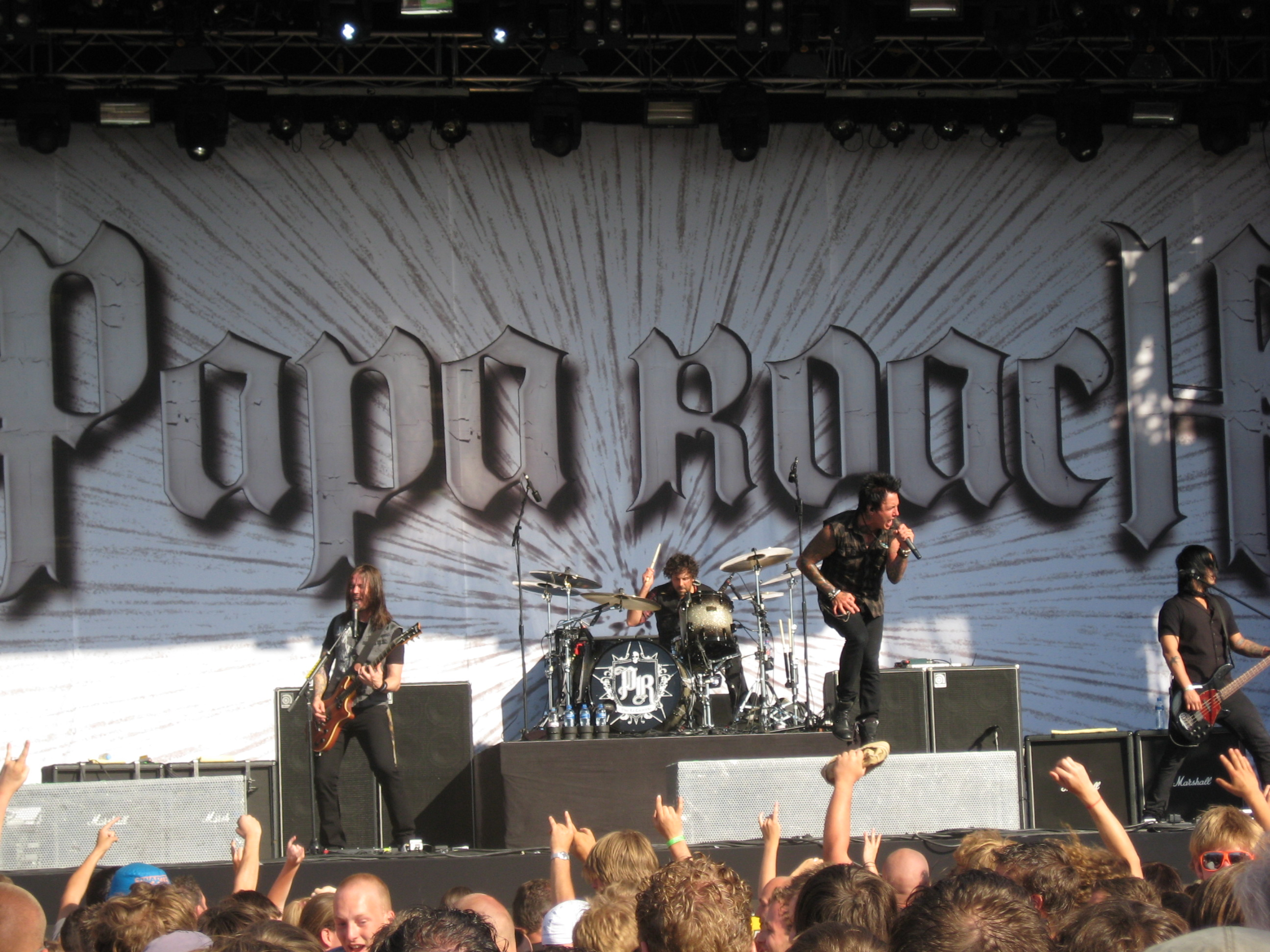
Papa Roach
(Zwarte Cross 2010)

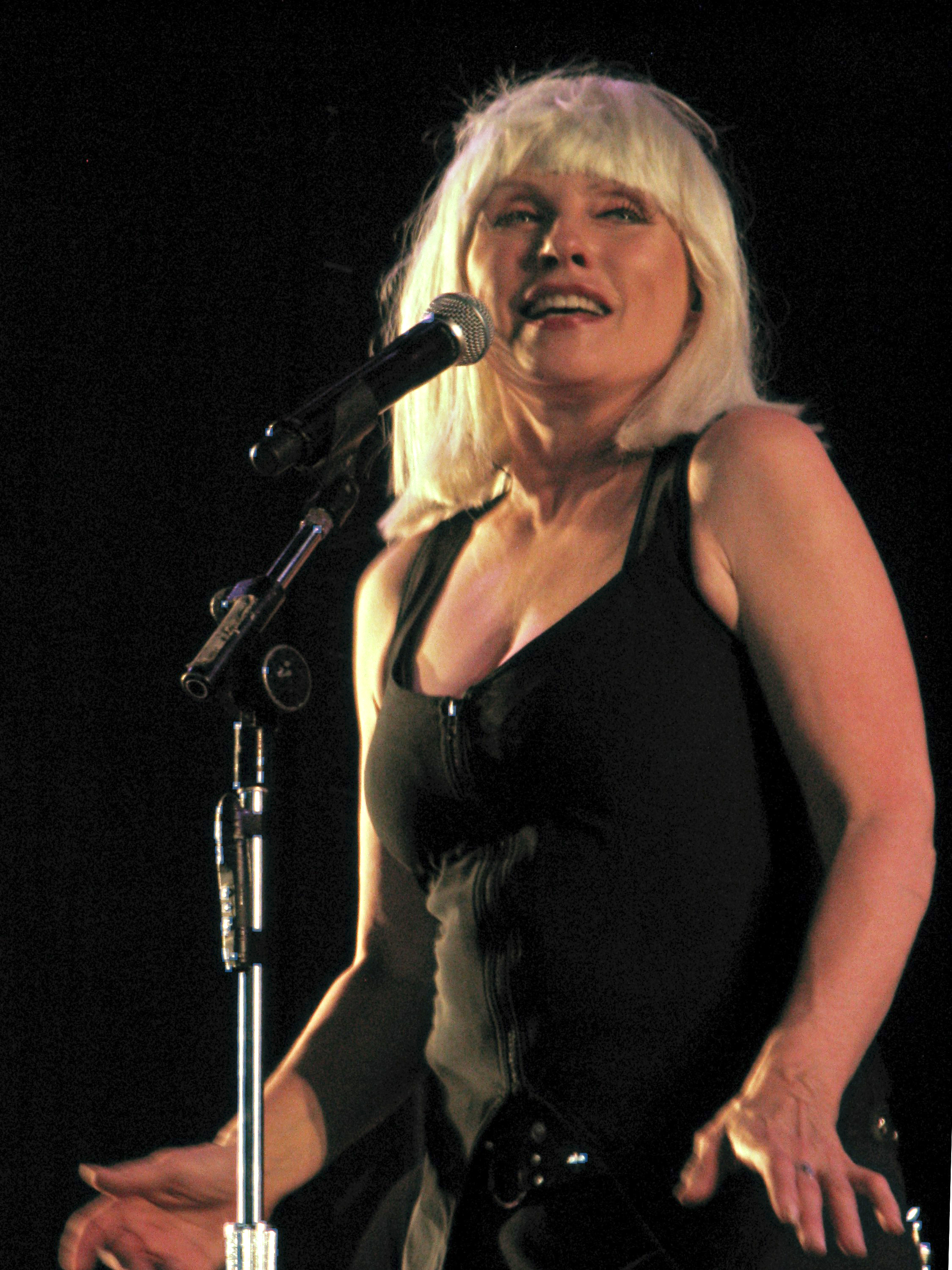
Blondie (2011)

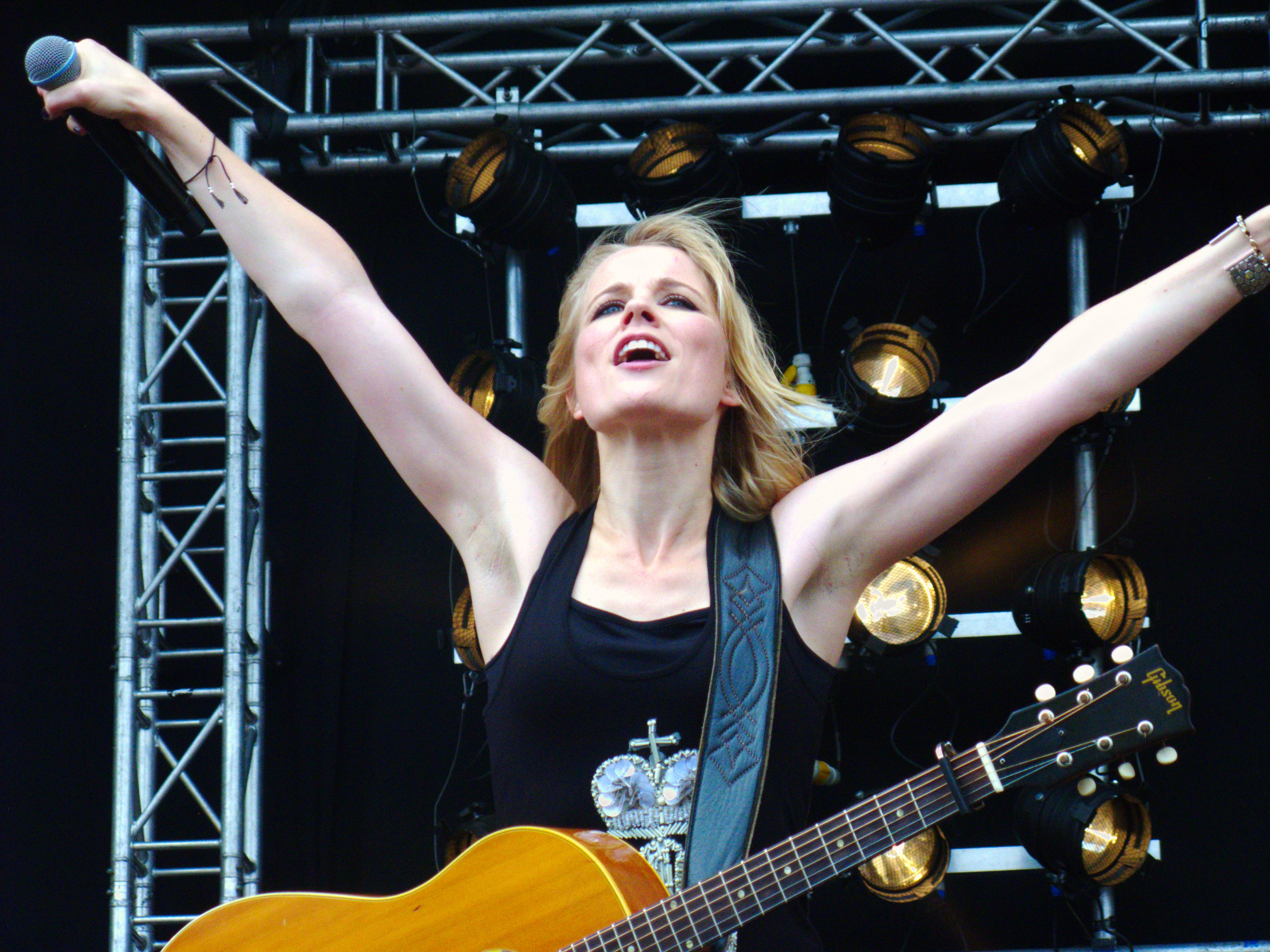
Ilse DeLange (2011)

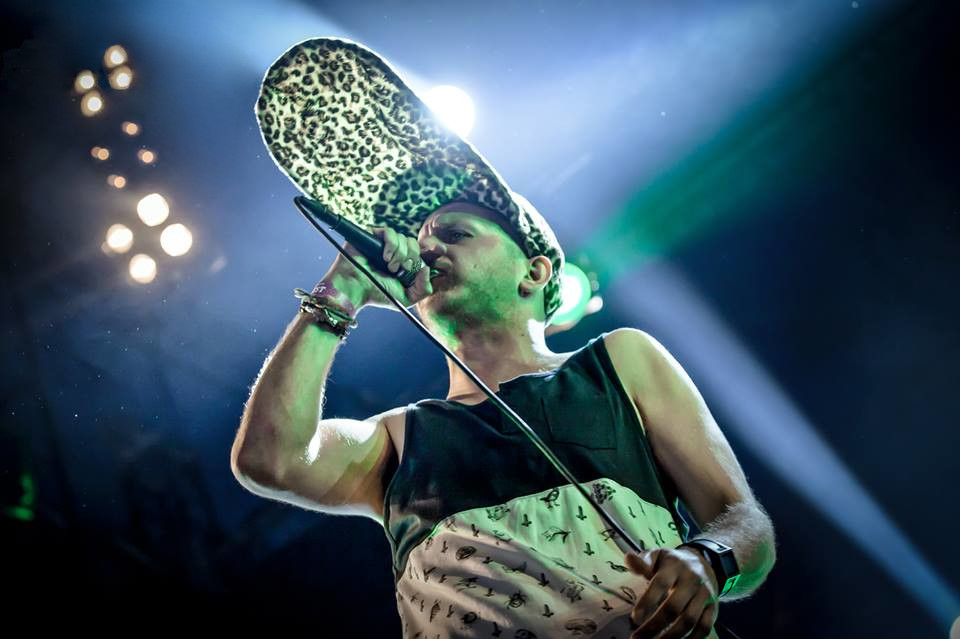
Jack Parow (2015)

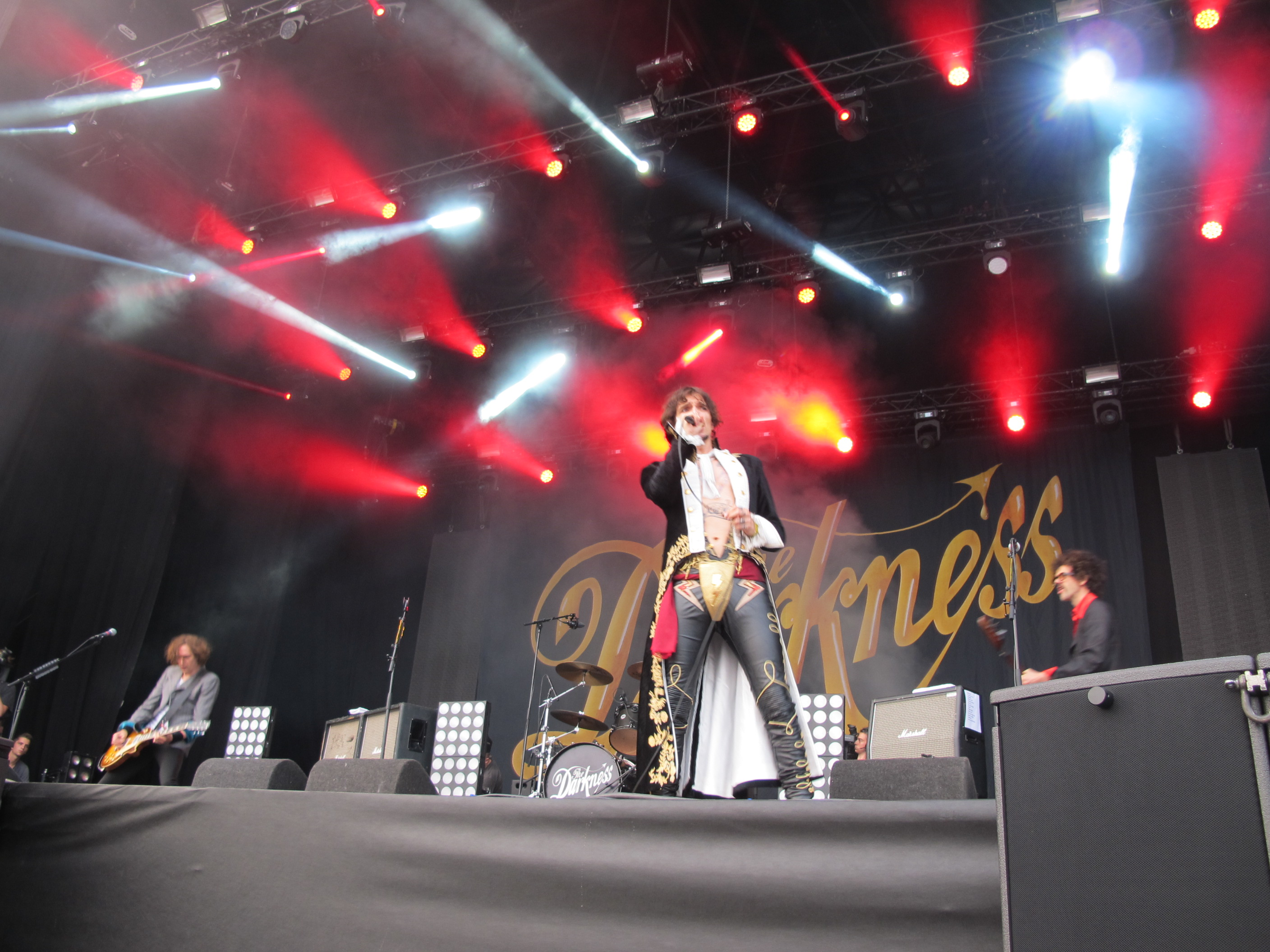
The Darkness (2016)

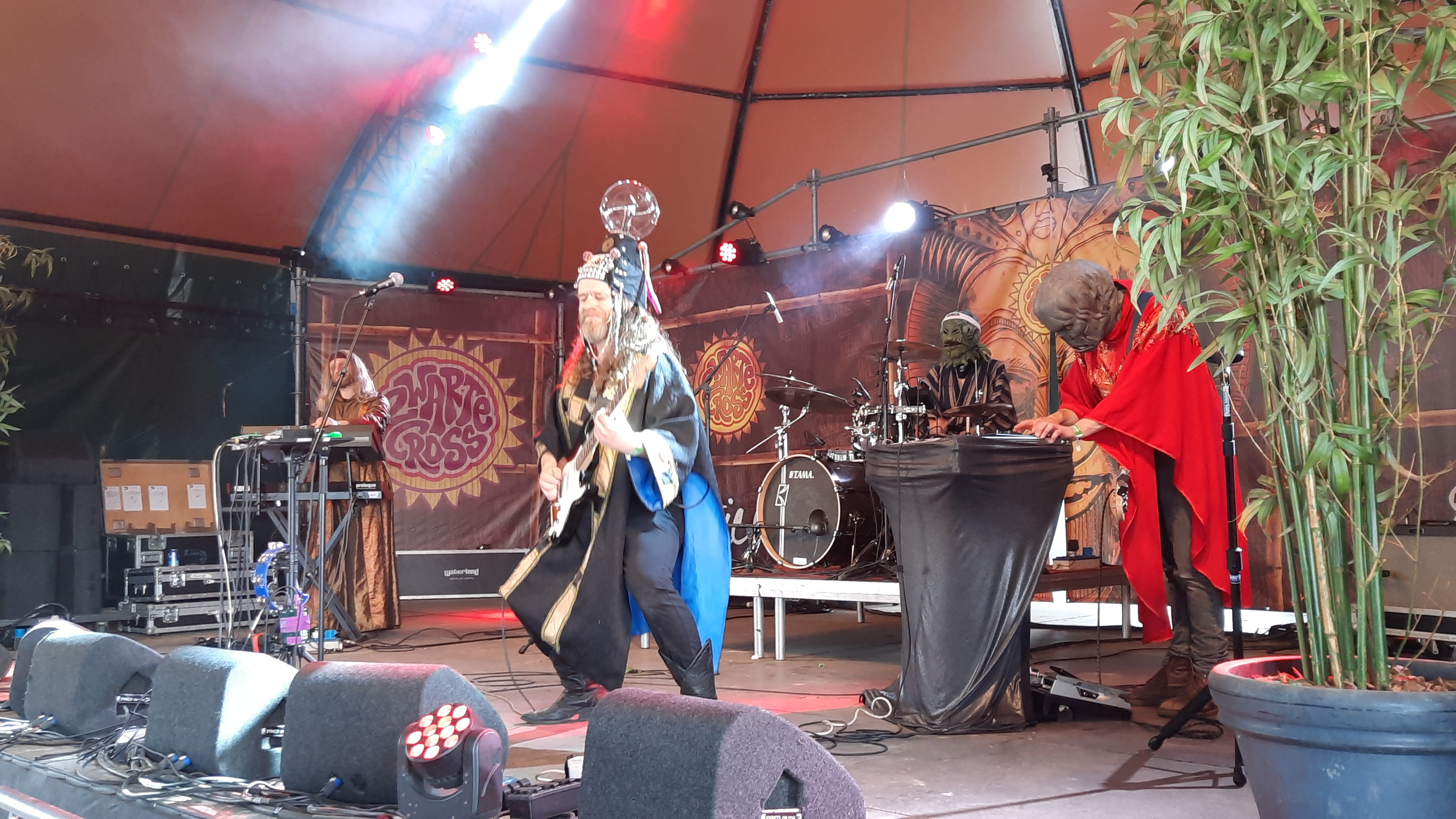
HENGE (2022)

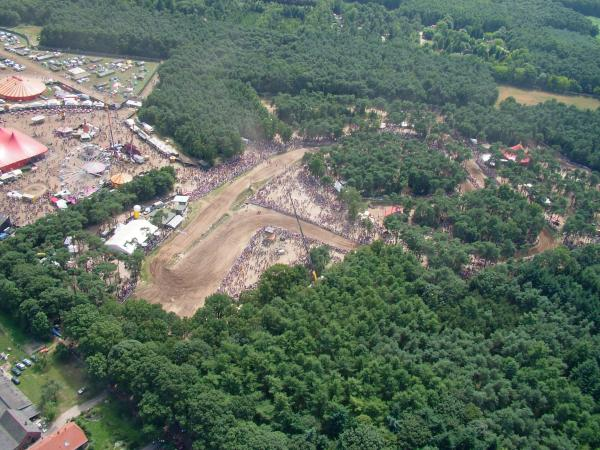
Cross track

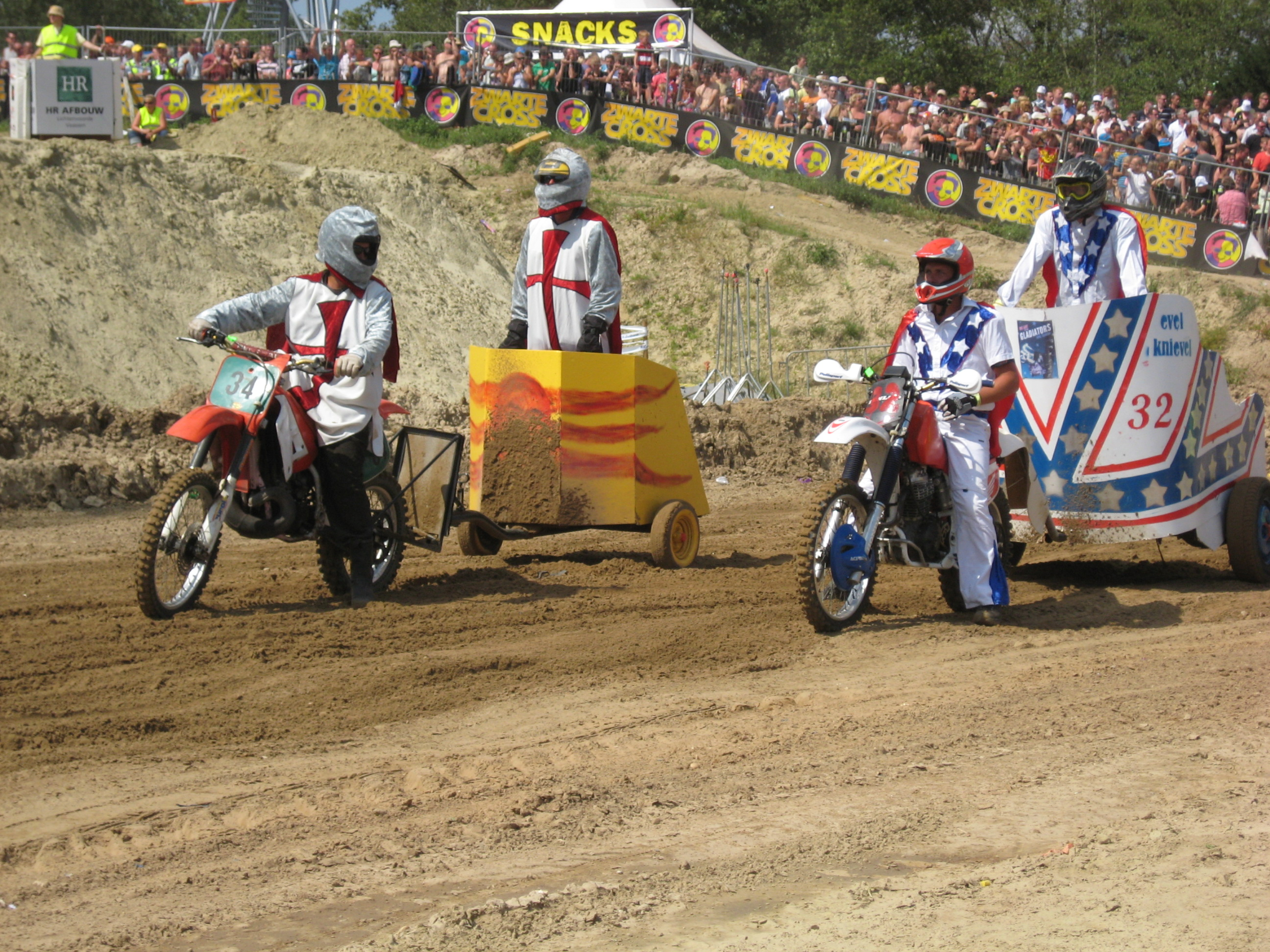
The Ben Hur Race
