= Conscious Roots =

Compilation album by Various Artists
- Released: 23 September 2004
- Recorded: Various Times
- Genre: Reggae
- Length: 67:37
- Label: EMI

Various Artists chronology
Conscious Roots (2004)	Conscious Roots 2 (2005)

Conscious Roots (full title: Conscious Roots: The Awakening of the Aotearoa roots movement) was released in 2004. The album is the 1st edition of the (NZ) series.

Conscious Roots comprises a mixture of classic roots, fused styles, genre busters, and beautiful raw acoustic songs. It showcases the growing full band live roots music scene in Aotearoa / New Zealand.

== Track listing ==
1. "Though We Are" - Unity Pacific
2. "Get Away" - Katchafire
3. "Miracles" - Cornerstone Roots
4. "Black Sunrise" (House of Shem Remix) - The Black Seeds featuring Te Omeka Perkins
5. "Bag of Money" - Barnaby
6. "Barely Can See" - Kora
7. "Are You Strong" - Unity Pacific
8. "Problems" - Salmonella Dub
9. "Call To You" - Trinity Roots
10. "Hope" - Fat Freddy's Drop
11. "Hold Tight" - Che Fu
12. "From Street to Sky" - Tigilau Ness
13. "Light" - Cornerstone Roots
