= De Staat =

Dutch alternative rock band

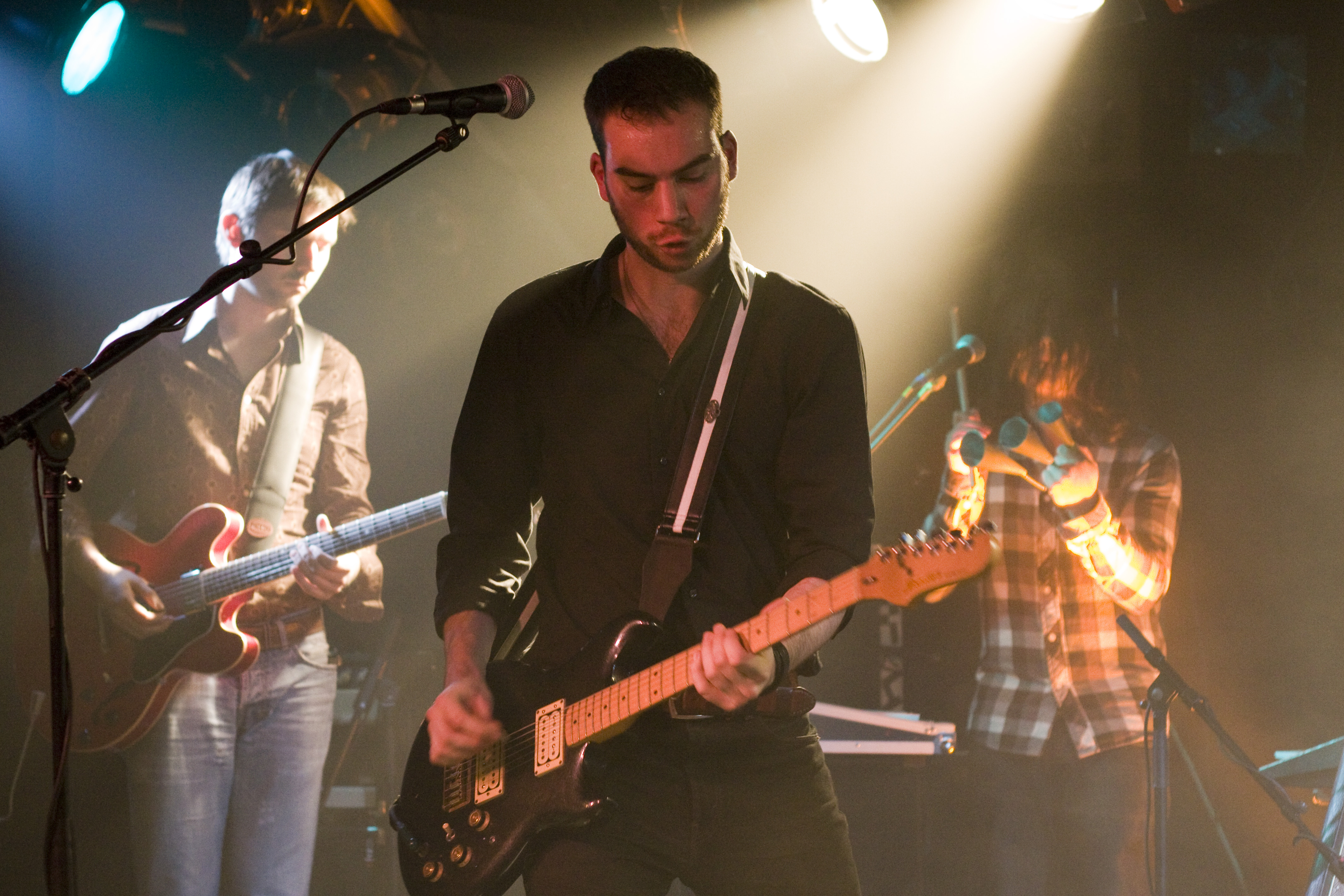

Background information
- Origin: Nijmegen, Gelderland, Netherlands
- Genres: Alternative rock, electronic rock, experimental rock
- Years active: 2006–present
- Label: Cool Green Recordings (part of Mascot Label Group)
- Members: Torre Florim; Vedran Mircetic; Jop van Summeren; Rocco Hueting; Tim van Delft
- Website: www.destaat.net

Circle pit during "Witch Doctor" at the Zwarte Cross 2016.

De Staat (Dutch pronunciation: [də ˈstaːt]) is a Dutch alternative rock band, formed in Nijmegen in 2006. Their name translates to "The State".

In May 2016, the band supported Muse in their Drones World Tour in Portugal, Germany, Belgium, Italy and Spain.

== Biography ==
De Staat was started as a one-man project by lead singer, Torre Florim, who later brought the band together. Their first demo was recorded in Florim's apartment in 2007. While still unsigned, the one-man project grew to a full grown band, due to well-received live performances in the Netherlands.

In 2008, the band were the support act for popular Belgian band Deus. De Staat were signed by Excelsior Recordings later that year. They released their debut album Wait for Evolution in January 2009. All the songs on this album were written and produced by Florim. He wrote the album as a graduating project for a "Music Production" course. During this time, front man Florim also produced the debut EP of Go Back To The Zoo, another band from Nijmegen.

Within a year De Staat's popularity rose and they were performing at festivals such as Dot to Dot, Glastonbury, Sziget and Lowlands.

The band released a recording of their performance at Lowlands 2009. During this performance, they were spotted by Chris Goss. Goss, music producer and front man of Masters of Reality introduced them to Mascot Records. Mascot re-released Wait for Evolution internationally in the spring of 2010. After their international debut, the band toured extensively, including performances on the Reeperbahn Festival and Glastonbury Festival in 2010.

Their second album Machinery was released internationally in 2011.

The band's third album I_CON was released on 16 September 2013. It was recorded mostly in France and produced by Torre Florim. The album is mixed by Vance Powell in Nashville, who worked with Jack White and The Raconteurs earlier. This album has probably been their most successful release so far, reaching number 2 in the Dutch Album Top 100 Chart, with the song Down Town from this album featured on the soundtrack to FIFA 14. They also received an award for Best Rock Artist at Edisons 2014. The band released their fourth album, Vinticious Versions, which saw the band re-stylize songs from their previous three albums, with a video competition to accompany each of the album tracks running on their YouTube channel.

In September 2015, two years after the release of "I_CON", De Staat released a music video for their song "Witch Doctor". The video, in which animated men run in circles around singer Florim while the camera pans out, revealing an immense crowd, features heavy usage of CGI and took nearly nine months to fully animate. The video was met with widespread acclaim and notable media attention in the Netherlands, and eventually earned them the award for Best Concept at the 2016 Berlin Music Video Awards. Subsequent live performances have usually featured 'Witch Doctor' as their final song, during which Florim occasionally stands in the middle of the audience to evoke the music video.

The band's fifth album, "O", was released in January 2016 and was met with critical acclaim. It subsequently won them a 3FM Award for Best Album and their second 3voor12 Award for Album of the Year. During the spring, De Staat joined Muse as the support act for several shows on their European tour, playing in cities such as Milan, Munich, and Madrid. On 16 December 2016, the song "Make The Call, Leave It All" was voted as 3voor12 Song of the Year.

On 18 January 2019, the band released their sixth studio album "Bubble Gum". The track "Kitty Kitty" has been used extensively on British television as part of an advertising campaign for the channel 'All4'.

== Members ==
- Torre Florim – lead vocals, rhythm guitar, percussion
- Vedran Mircetic – lead guitar
- Jop van Summeren – bass guitar, synthesizer, backing vocals
- Rocco Hueting – keys, synthesizer, percussion, rhythm guitar, vocals
- Tim van Delft – drums

== Discography ==
=== Albums ===
- Wait for Evolution (2009)
- Machinery (2011)
- I_Con (2013)
- Vinticious Versions (EP) (2014)
- O (2016)
- Bubble Gum (2019)
- Red / Yellow / Blue (2023)
- De Staat (2026)

=== Singles ===
- "The Fantastic Journey of the Underground Man" (2008)
- "Wait for Evolution" (2009)
- "Habibi" (2009)
- "Sweatshop" (2011)
- "Ah, I See" (2011)
- "I'll Never Marry You" (2011)
- "Let It Snow" (2011)
- "Firestarter" (2012)
- "Make Way for the Passenger" (2013)
- "Devil's Blood" (2013)
- "Down Town" (2013)
- "All Is Dull" (2013)
- "Get It Together" (2014)
- "Input Source Select (Vinticious Version)" (2014)
- "Witch Doctor" (2015)
- "Peptalk" (2015)
- "Make the Call, Leave It All" (2016)
- "Get On Screen" (2016)
- "Round" (2017)
- "Kitty Kitty" (2018)
- "I'm Out of Your Mind" (2018)
- "Mona Lisa" (2018)
- "Phoenix" (2019)
- "Kitty Kitty (Soulwax Remix)" (2019)
- "0.0" (feat. Rico & Sticks) (2019)
- "What Goes, Let Go" (2021)
- "Numbers Up" (2021)
- "Look at Me" (2021)
- "Paying Attention" (2022)
- "Who's Gonna Be the GOAT?" (2022)
- "One Day" (2022)
- "The King" (2026)
- "The Fire" (2026)

=== DVD ===
- Live @ Lowlands 2009 (2009)

== Awards ==
=== Winner ===
- Live XS magazine – Best Album of 2009
- 3voor12 Award 2009 – Best Album in the Netherlands
- "Duiveltje" – Best vocalist 2009
- 3FM Award 2011 – Best Alternative Act
- "Duiveltje" – Best drummer 2011
- 3FM Award 2012 – Best Alternative Act
- Edison Award 2014 – Best Rock Album
- International Music Video Award (Paris) 2015 – Audience Award
- Berlin Music Video Award 2016 – Best Concept for "Witch Doctor"
- 3FM Award 2016 – Best Album for "O"
- 3voor12 Award 2016 – Best Album in the Netherlands for "O"
- 3voor12 Song of the Year for "Make The Call, Leave It All"
- Berlin Music Video Awards 2016, Best Concept for 'WITCH DOCTOR'

=== Nominated ===
- Edison Award 2010 – Best Album
- Edison Award 2011 – Best Group
- Edison Award 2011 – Best Song
- 3FM Award 2014 – Best Band
- 3FM Award 2014 – Best Artist Rock
- 3FM Award 2015 – Best Artist Rock
- 3FM Award 2017 – Best Group
- 3FM Award 2017 – Best Live
