= Katchafire =

New Zealand Roots reggae band

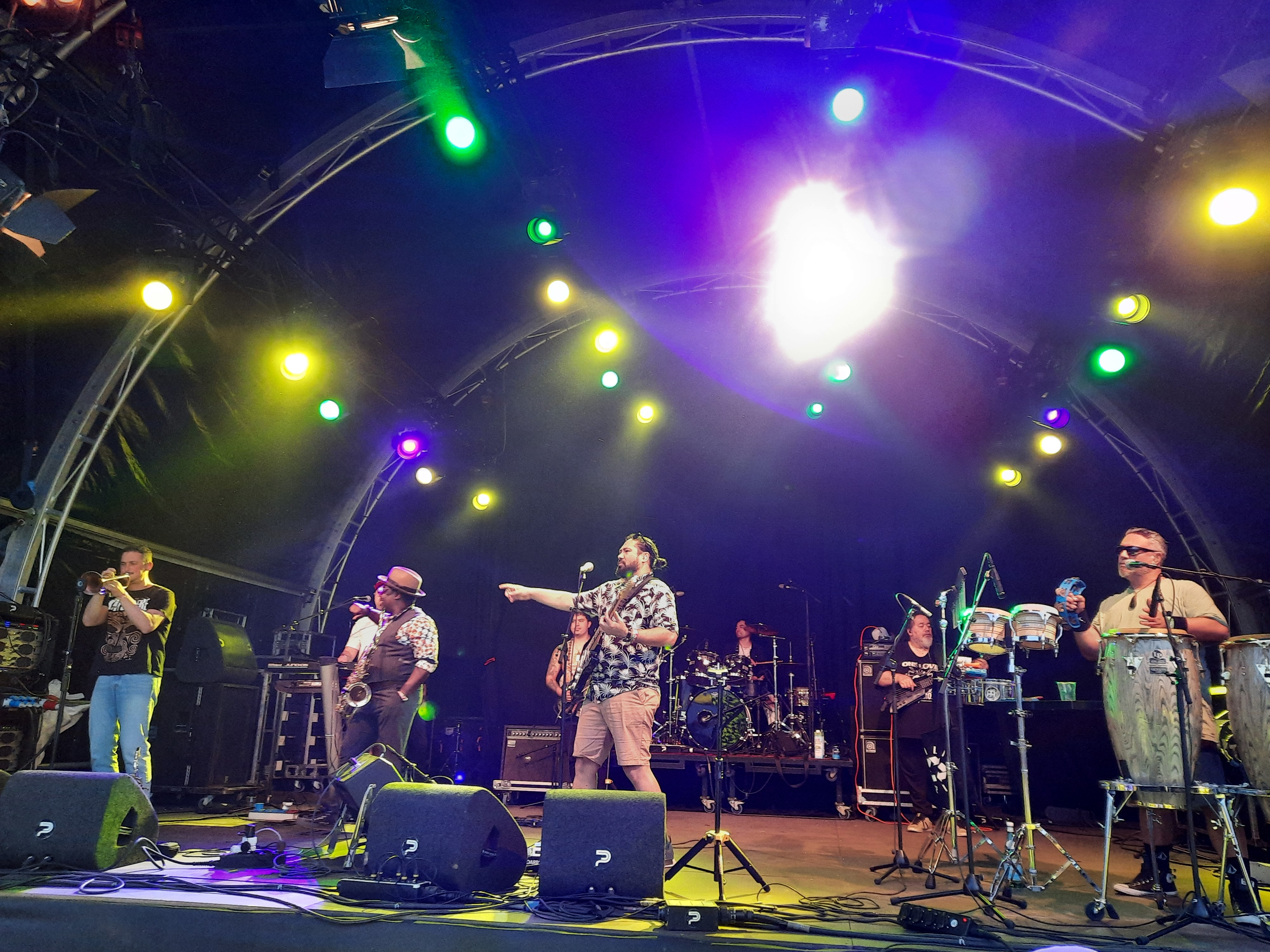
- Katchafire at the Zwarte Cross festival in the Netherlands, July 2022

Background information
- Origin: New Zealand
- Genres: Roots reggae
- Years active: 1997–present
- Labels: Lion House, VP/Greensleeves
- Members: Logan Bell; Jordan Bell; Tere Ngarua; Leon Davey; Wiremu Barriball; Roy Kaiki
- Past members: Ara Adams-Tamatea; Jamey Ferguson; Thompson Hohepa; Haani Totorewa; Grenville Bell
- Website: www.katchafireofficial.com

Katchafire are an all Māori New Zealand roots reggae band from Hamilton, New Zealand.

== History ==
Katchafire formed in Hamilton in 1997, originally as a Bob Marley tribute band. The band's name derives from Catch A Fire, The Wailers' debut album. They have released six albums: Revival (2003), which featured the highest-selling New Zealand single of 2002 "Giddy Up", Slow Burning (2005) Say What You're Thinking (2007), On the Road Again (2010), which peaked at No. 3 on the US Billboard Reggae chart, and the compilation Best So Far (2013) Legacy (2018).

The band has extensively toured Australia, the UK, Europe, the United States, New Caledonia, the Pacific Islands, Guam, Indonesia, Brazil including their home country of New Zealand and have played on the same bills as The Wailers, The Marley's, Steel Pulse, Third World, UB40, Shaggy, Lauryn Hill, Fiji, and Horace Andy.

== Band members ==
The band's original line-up consisted of founder Grenville Bell (manager, lead guitar) with his two sons Logan (vocals) Jordan (drums), the line-up expanded to include eight members, including Jerry Taukamo (lead vocals, lead guitar), Thompson Hohepa (lead vocals), Hani Totorewa (keyboards, vocals); bass duties went to a number of different musicians, Jhonny Fish (John Kennedy), Shocka (Shane Maraki), Tere Ngarua and Travis Te Hau.

As a result of commitments with other bands, family and religion, lead singer Jerry Taukamo departed from the band Katchafire with Logan stepping into the position becoming the band's new and current lead singer.

With the addition of James "Jamey" Ferguson (vocals, keyboard, saxophone) and departure of Tere Ngarua, it opened the opportunity for Ara Adams Tamatea (bass, band management) and Leonard "Leon" Davey (percussion, vocals) to join, not long after which it allowed Grenville Bell to step out of the management duties and continue his role as the band's lead guitarist.

The band went through yet another change in line-up as Ara Adams Tamatea stepped down from his role as manager/bass player, continuing only as the band's New Zealand booking agent, with original bass player Tere Ngarua returning and Logan Bell taking over the band management.

The current line-up:

- Logan Bell (guitar, vocals) 1997–present
- Jordan Bell (drums, vocals) 1997–present
- Leonard "Leon" Davey (percussion, vocals) 2000–present
- Tere Ngarua (bass guitar) 1997, 2007–present
- Roy Kaiki (keyboards, vocals) 2016–present
- Wiremu Barriball (lead guitar, vocals) 2016–present

Former members:

- Grenville Bell (lead guitar) 1997–2014
- Haani Totorewa (keyboards, guitar, vocals) 1997–2013
- James "Jamey" Ferguson (keyboards, saxophone, vocals) 2000–2013
- Ara Adams Tamatea (bass) 2000–2006
- Jerry Taukamo (lead vocals, lead guitar)
- John "Jhonny fish" Kennedy (bass)
- Shane "Shocka" Maraki (bass)
- Travis Te Hau (bass)

== Discography ==
=== Albums ===
Year	Album	Label	Peak chart positions
Year	Album	Label	NZ
2003	Revival	Mai Music	5
2005	Slow Burning	Mai/Shock	12
2007	Say What You're Thinking	EMI	5
2010	On the Road Again	EMI/Lion House Records	3
2013	Best So Far (compilation)	VP/Greensleeves	3
2018	Legacy	Universal NZ/Zojak Worldwide	8

=== Featured appearances ===
Katchafire have appeared on a number of compilations since 2002 in New Zealand. The following is a list of these albums that have featured tracks by the band.

Release	Album	Label	Track
2002	Simply the Best Reggae Album	Warner Music	"Bounce"
2003	The Reggae Collection	Universal Music	"Collie Herb Man" and "Giddy Up"
2003	Off the Hook 3	Sony Music	"Get Away" (Remix)
2004	Conscious Roots	Capitol Music	"Get Away"
2005	Conscious Roots 2	Capitol Music	"Frisk Me Down"
2006	More Nature	Sony BMG	"Giddy Up"
2007	Conscious Roots 4	EMI	"This World"

=== Singles ===
Year	Title	Peak chart positions	Album
Year	Title	NZ	Album
2002	"Giddy Up"	4	Revival
2002	"Who You With"	10	Revival
2003	"Get Away"	8	Revival
2004	"Rude Girl"	—	Slow Burning
2005	"Hey Girl"	—	Slow Burning
2006	"Frisk Me Down"	—	Slow Burning
2007	"Say What You're Thinking"	—	Say What You're Thinking
2008	"Love Letter"	—	Say What You're Thinking
2009	"Working"	—	Say What You're Thinking
2010	"Slow Down" feat. Rebel Souljahz	—	Bring Back The Days
2010	"Just You & Me" feat. Na Wai	—	Non-album single
2010	"On the Road Again"	—	On the Road Again
2010	"Groove Again"	—	On the Road Again
2016	"Burn It Down"	—	
2017	"Addicted"		Legacy
2017	"Way Beyond"		Legacy
2018	"Love Today"		Legacy
2018	"100"		Legacy
2019	"Fyah in the Trenches"		Legacy
2020	"Circle Back"	— (Note: "Circle Back" did not enter the NZ Top 40 Singles Chart, but peaked at number 11 on the NZ Hot Singles Chart.)	Non-album singles
2021	"Karawhiua"	— (Note: "Karawhiua" did not enter the NZ Top 40 Singles Chart, but peaked at number 11 on the NZ Hot Singles Chart.)	Non-album singles
2021	"Whaingaroa"	— (Note: "Whaingaroa" did not enter the NZ Top 40 Singles Chart, but peaked at number 21 on the NZ Hot Singles Chart.)	Non-album singles
2022	"Always with You"	— (Note: "Always with You" did not enter the NZ Top 40 Singles Chart, but peaked at number 23 on the NZ Hot Singles Chart.)	Non-album singles
2024	"Magic (What She Do)"	— (Note: "Magic (What She Do)" (acoustic) did not enter the NZ Top 40 Singles Chart, but peaked at number 29 on the NZ Hot Singles Chart.)	Non-album singles
2024	"Commit"	— (Note: "Commit" did not enter the NZ Top 40 Singles Chart, but peaked at number 28 on the NZ Hot Singles Chart.)	Non-album singles
2025	"Collie Herb Man" (Revival 2.0)	— (Note: "Collie Herb Man" (Revival 2.0) did not enter the NZ Top 40 Singles Chart, but peaked at number 26 on the NZ Hot Singles Chart.)	Non-album singles
2025	"Giddy Up" (Revival 2.0)	— (Note: "Giddy Up" (Revival 2.0) did not enter the NZ Top 40 Singles Chart, but peaked at number 29 on the NZ Hot Singles Chart.)	Non-album singles
2026	"Seriously" (featuring Ali Campbell)	— (Note: "Seriously" did not enter the NZ Top 40 Singles Chart, but peaked at number 33 on the NZ Hot Singles Chart.)	Non-album singles
2026	"Giddy Up" (featuring Emily Wurramara)	— (Note: "Giddy Up" did not enter the NZ Top 40 Singles Chart, but peaked at number 39 on the NZ Hot Singles Chart.)	Non-album singles
