= Benny Blisto =

Studio album by Go Back to the Zoo
- Released: August 10, 2010
- Genre: Indie rock
- Length: 35:20
- Label: Universal Music

Benny Blisto is the debut album from the Dutch indie band Go Back to the Zoo.

== Track listing ==
| No. | Title | Length |
|---|---|---|
| 1. | "Electric" | 3:08 |
| 2. | "I'm The Night (See You Later)" | 3:54 |
| 3. | "Beam Me Up" | 2:39 |
| 4. | "Hey DJ" | 3:08 |
| 5. | "Gotta Wake Up" | 3:54 |
| 6. | "Nicer" | 3:01 |
| 7. | "House On Fire" | 2:51 |
| 8. | "Fuck You" | 2:49 |
| 9. | "Oh No (We Stayed)" | 3:08 |
| 10. | "Sweet World" | 2:59 |
| 11. | "I Lov It" | 3:33 |
| 12. | "Smoking On The Balcony" | 3:01 |
| 13. | "Change" | 3:00 |
| Total length: | | 41:21 |

- All songs written by Go Back to the Zoo.

== Personnel ==
- Go Back to the Zoo
  - Cas Hieltjes – vocals and guitars
  - Teun Hieltjes – guitars and vocals
  - Bram Kniest – drums and vocals
  - Lars Kroon – bass guitar
