= Revival (Katchafire album) =

2003 album by Katchafire

Studio album by Katchafire
- Released: 4 June 2003
- Genre: Roots reggae; Pacific reggae
- Length: 42:37
- Label: Mai Music

Katchafire chronology
Revival (2003)	Slow Burning (2005)

Singles from Revival
- 1. "Giddy Up" Released: 2002; 2. "Who You With" Released: 2002; 3. "Get Away" Released: 2003

Revival is the debut studio album by New Zealand band Katchafire, released on 4 June 2003. Released after the success of the band's debut single "Giddy Up" (2002), the album was a commercial success, and led to a new wave of popular New Zealand reggae musicians.

== Production ==
Katchafire formed in June 1997, as a Bob Marley tribute band that extensively toured New Zealand in the late 1990s and early 2000s. In 2002, the band were signed to Mai Music, a newly formed record label established by Ngāti Whātua Ōrākei as a sister project to urban contemporary radio station Mai FM, as a way to promote Māori musicians.

Revival was recorded at the Mai FM studios in Auckland, and was produced by Chris Macro of the Dubious Brothers, taking inspiration from the Pacific reggae sound of Herbs. All songs on the album were original tracks except for the final track, a cover of Bob Marley's "Redemption Song". Band member Logan Bell felt that Bob Marley resonated with Māori people due to how Marley sung about cultural pride and oppression. The band took inspiration from this, adapting lyrics for their own life experiences as Māori.

== Release and promotion ==
The album was preceded by the singles "Giddy Up" and "Who You With" in 2002. "Giddy Up" was a commercial success in New Zealand, becoming the 17th most successful single of 2002 in the country (and the third most successful by a New Zealand artist). "Giddy Up" was later added to the soundtrack of the Australian film Blurred (2002).

The album was released on 4 June 2003. The bonus edition features three dub remixes: "Colour Me Dub" by Maui Usher and Jah Remnant, "Collie Herb Man / Reactor Dub" by Joost Langveld and Roger Perry, and "Dub Me All Jelly" by Chris Macro of the Dubious Brothers. Some editions of the album omit "Redemption Song". The band toured New Zealand for four months following the album's release. In July 2003, the band released "Get Away" as the third single from the album.

In 2023, the album was re-released on vinyl by Flying Nun Records.

== Commercial reception ==
Revival debuted at number five in New Zealand, and was certified gold three weeks later. By November, the album had been certified platinum. By 2005, the album had become double platinum certified, The album re-charted on the Official NZ Catalogue Albums in 2023, and by September had become four times platinum certified.

Revival was the 23rd most successful album in New Zealand in 2003, and the 29th in 2004. In 2023, the album was the 10th most successful album by a New Zealand artist in the country.

== Critical reception ==
Graham Reid of The New Zealand Herald gave the album a five-star review, noting the retro feel of reggae music in 2003, and feeling that the album took strong inspiration from Bob Marley and the Wailers. Reid praised the "warm, classic, soul-reggae voices" of Logan Bell and Jamey Ferguson, and felt that the album was filled with "immediately memorable" songs from different reggae genres.

Scott Miller writing for The Niche Cache highly praised the album, feeling this was one of the most essential New Zealand reggae albums that pioneered the modern kiwi reggae sound, a sentiment echoed by music journalist Gareth Shute.

== Track listing ==
Revival track listing
No.	Title	Writer(s)	Length
1.	"Reggae Revival"	Ara Adams Tamatea; Jamey Ferguson; Jordan Bell; Logan Bell; Thompson Hohepa	4:14
2.	"Get Away"	Tamatea; Ferguson; J. Bell; L. Bell; Hohepa	3:32
3.	"Who You With"	Ferguson; J. Bell	4:08
4.	"Colour Me Life"	Ferguson; J. Bell	3:23
5.	"Lose Your Power"	Ferguson; J. Bell	3:29
6.	"Collie Herb Man"	Tamatea; Ferguson; J. Bell; L. Bell; Hohepa	3:11
7.	"Sensimillia"	Tamatea; Ferguson; J. Bell; L. Bell; Hohepa	3:10
8.	"Done Did It"	Tamatea; Grenville Bell; Ferguson; J. Bell; L. Bell	3:46
9.	"Seriously"	Tamatea; Ferguson; J. Bell; L. Bell; Hohepa	3:22
10.	"Giddy Up"	Tamatea; Ferguson; J. Bell; L. Bell	3:07
11.	"Bounce"	Tamatea; Ferguson; J. Bell; L. Bell; Hohepa	3:26
12.	"Redemption Song"	Bob Marley	3:49
Total length:			42:37

Bonus tracks
No.	Title	Writer(s)	Length
13.	"Colour Me Dub"	Ferguson; J. Bell	4:57
14.	"Collie Herb Man / Reactor Dub"	Tamatea; Ferguson; J. Bell; L. Bell; Hohepa	7:18
15.	"Dub Me All Jelly"		7:23
Total length:			62:15

== Charts ==
=== Weekly charts ===
Weekly chart performance for Revival
Chart (2003)	Peak position
New Zealand Albums (RMNZ)	5

=== Year-end charts ===
Year-end chart performance for Revival
Chart	Year	Position
New Zealand Albums (RMNZ)	2003	23
New Zealand Albums (RMNZ)	2004	29

== Certifications ==
Certifications for Revival
Region	Certification	Certified units/sales
New Zealand (RMNZ)	5× Platinum	75,000^{‡}
^{‡} Sales+streaming figures based on certification alone.
