= Halle, Netherlands =

Halle
- Village
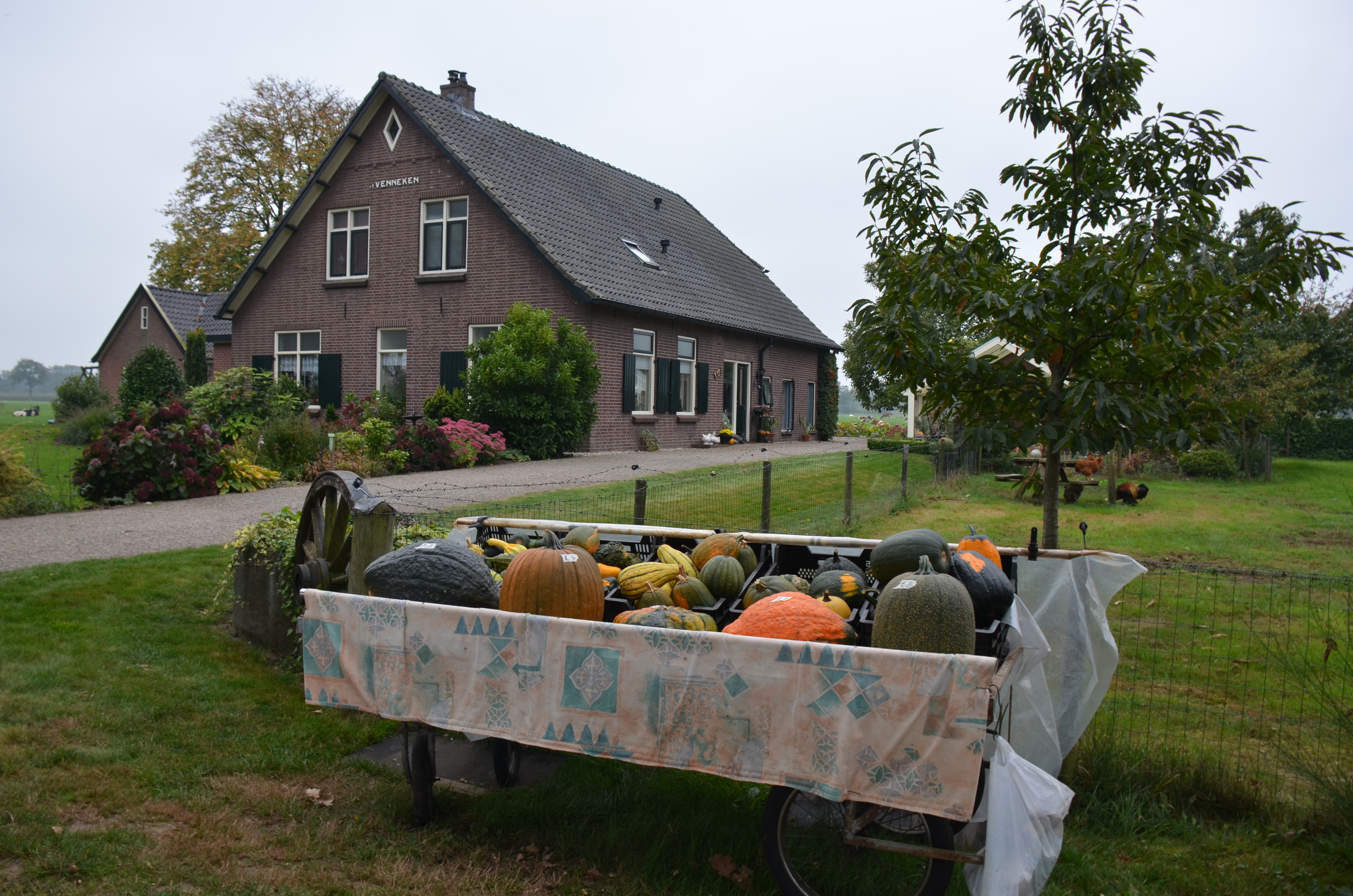
- Farm with pumpkins for sale

- Location in the province of Gelderland Halle (Netherlands)
- Coordinates: 51.9905°N 6.4288°E
- Country: Netherlands
- Province: Gelderland
- Municipality: Bronckhorst

Area
  - Total: 28.97 km^{2} (11.19 sq mi)
- Elevation: 20 m (66 ft)

Population (2021)
  - Total: 2,165
  - Density: 74.73/km^{2} (193.6/sq mi)
- Time zone: UTC+1 (CET)
  - Summer (DST): UTC+2 (CEST)
- Postal code: 7025
- Dialing code: 0314

Halle is a village in the municipality of Bronckhorst in the Dutch province of Gelderland.

== History ==
It was first mentioned in 1263 as Hall, and means "bend in highland". The village is located on a sandy ridge through the moorland of the Achterhoek, and was in an area suitable for agriculture in a region of swamps and heaths. In 1840, it was home to 690 people. In 1848, the windmill Molen van Coops and operated until 1925 when it was converted into a motor powered mill. It was damaged in 1945, and the remainder was demolished in the 1990s. In 1858, the Grote Kerk was built in the village.

In March 1945, Halle became part of the German defence line. The population had fled the village, however much of the village including the church were destroyed. The church was rebuilt in 1951. In 1976, a tower was added to the church.

== Sports ==
The motocross circuit Kappenbulten near Halle organises an annual grand prix. The Zwarte Cross music and motocross festival used to be located at the Kappenbulten circuit until 2006, when it moved it Lichtenvoorde, because the festival needed more space. An autocross is also takes place in Halle.

== Gallery ==
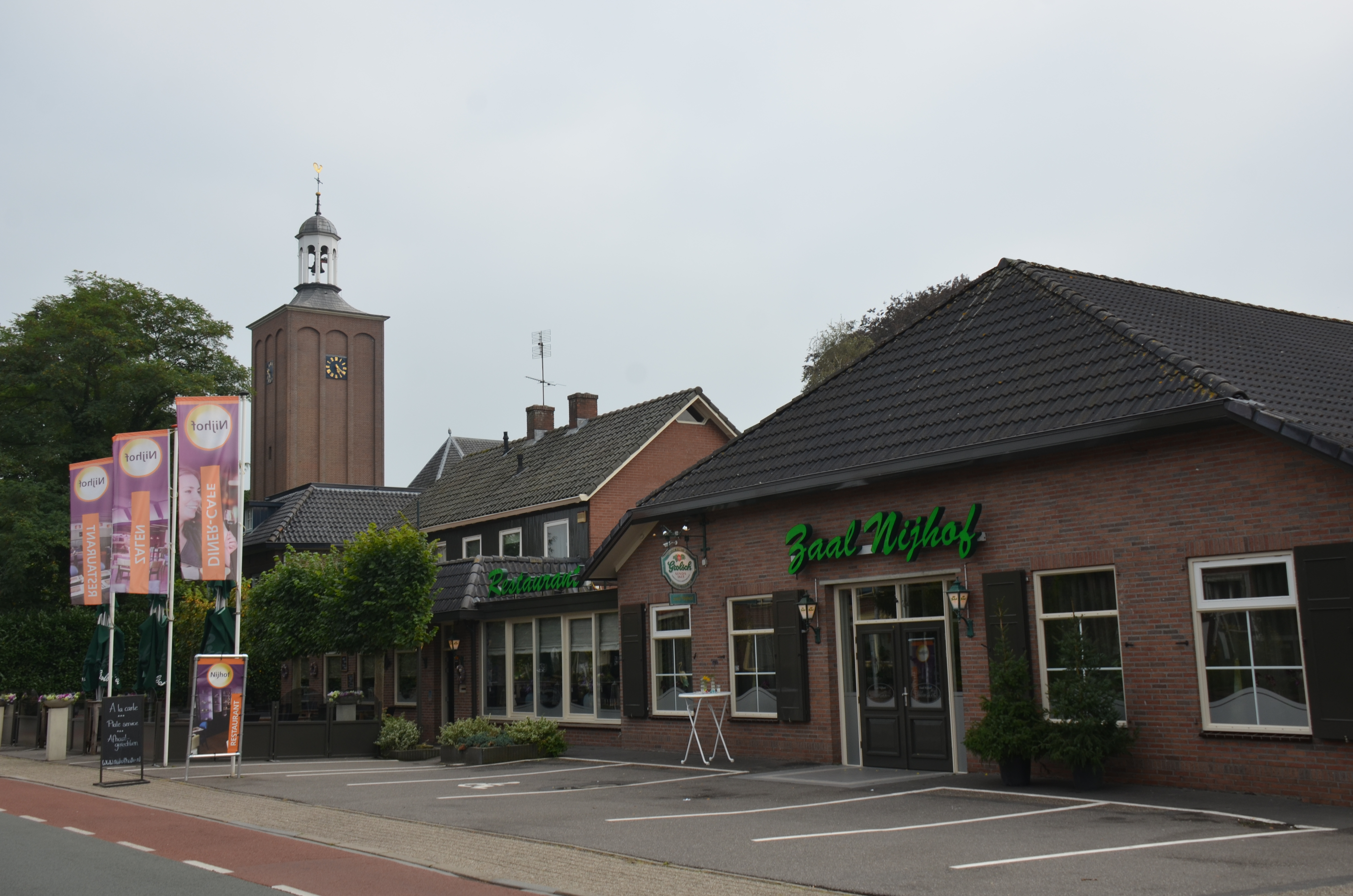
Restaurant in Halle

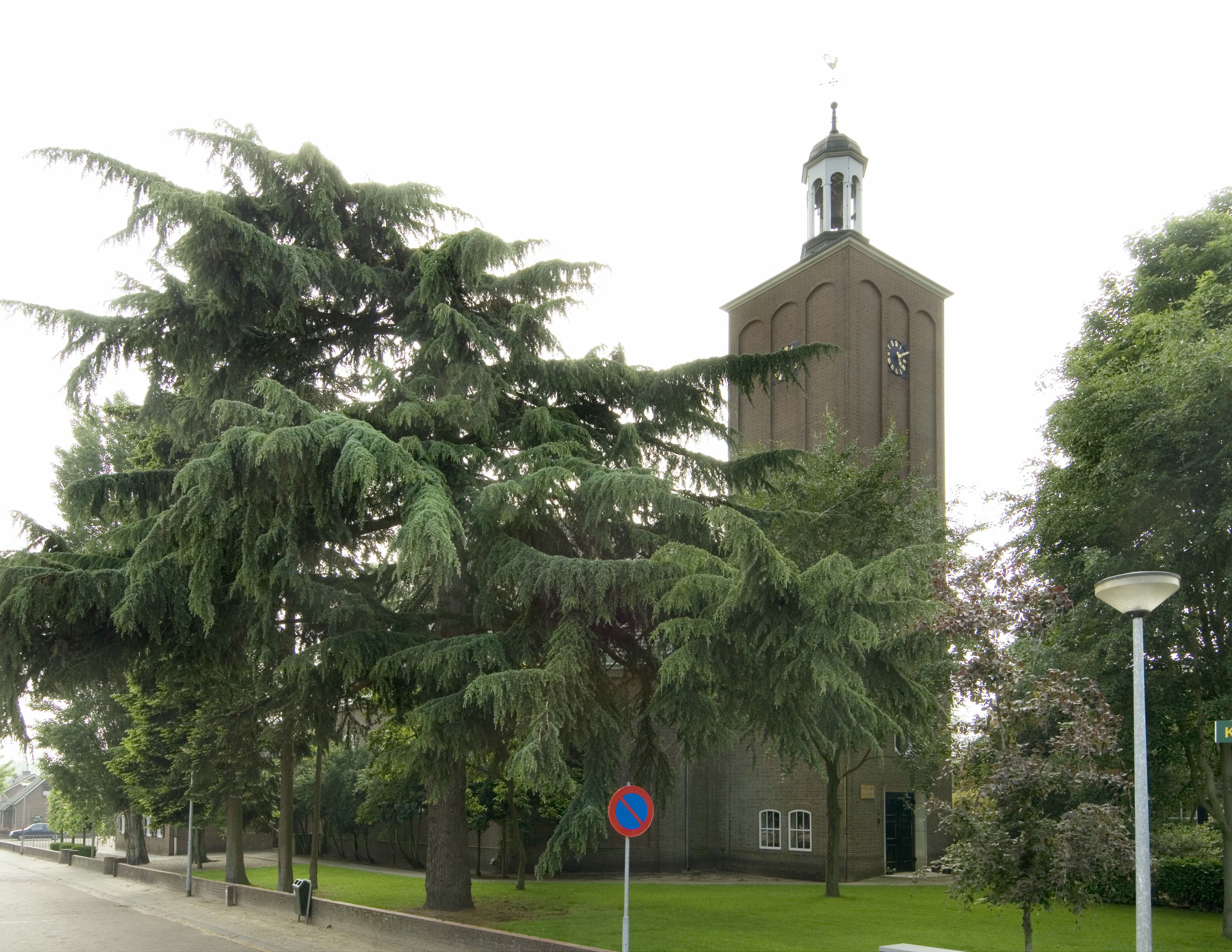
Church in Halle
