= Say What You're Thinking =

Studio album by Katchafire
- Released: 14 August 2007
- Recorded: 2006
- Genre: Reggae
- Length: 53:30
- Label: EMI
- Producer: Nick Manders

Katchafire chronology
Slow Burning (2004)	Say What You're Thinking (2007)

Professional ratings
Review scores
Source	Rating
Allmusic	link
Music for America	favorable link

Say What You're Thinking is an album by New Zealand reggae band, Katchafire. It was released in New Zealand on 14 August 2007 and in Australia on 17 November 2007.

== Track listing ==
1. "Say What You’re Thinking" (J. Ferguson) – 4:55
2. "Now Girl" (L. Davey) – 3:58
3. "Doesn't Anybody" (J. Ferguson) – 4:16
4. "Mr Flava" (L. Bell, J. Bell) – 4:57
5. "J Dubb" (J. Bell) – 4:27
6. "This World" (H. Totowera) – 3:57
7. "Hold On" (J. Ferguson) – 3:54
8. "Love Letter" (L. Davey) – 3:33
9. "Ultra Music" (L. Bell, J. Bell) – 5:36
10. "Meant To Be" (L. Bell) – 5:16
11. "Pain" (J. Ferguson) – 5:21
12. "Working" (L. Bell, J. Bell, J. Lee) – 3:36

Bonus track: "Agent-H" (Instrumental) (Not included on album release, track can be purchased through iTunes as single release)
