= House of Shem =

New Zealand reggae band

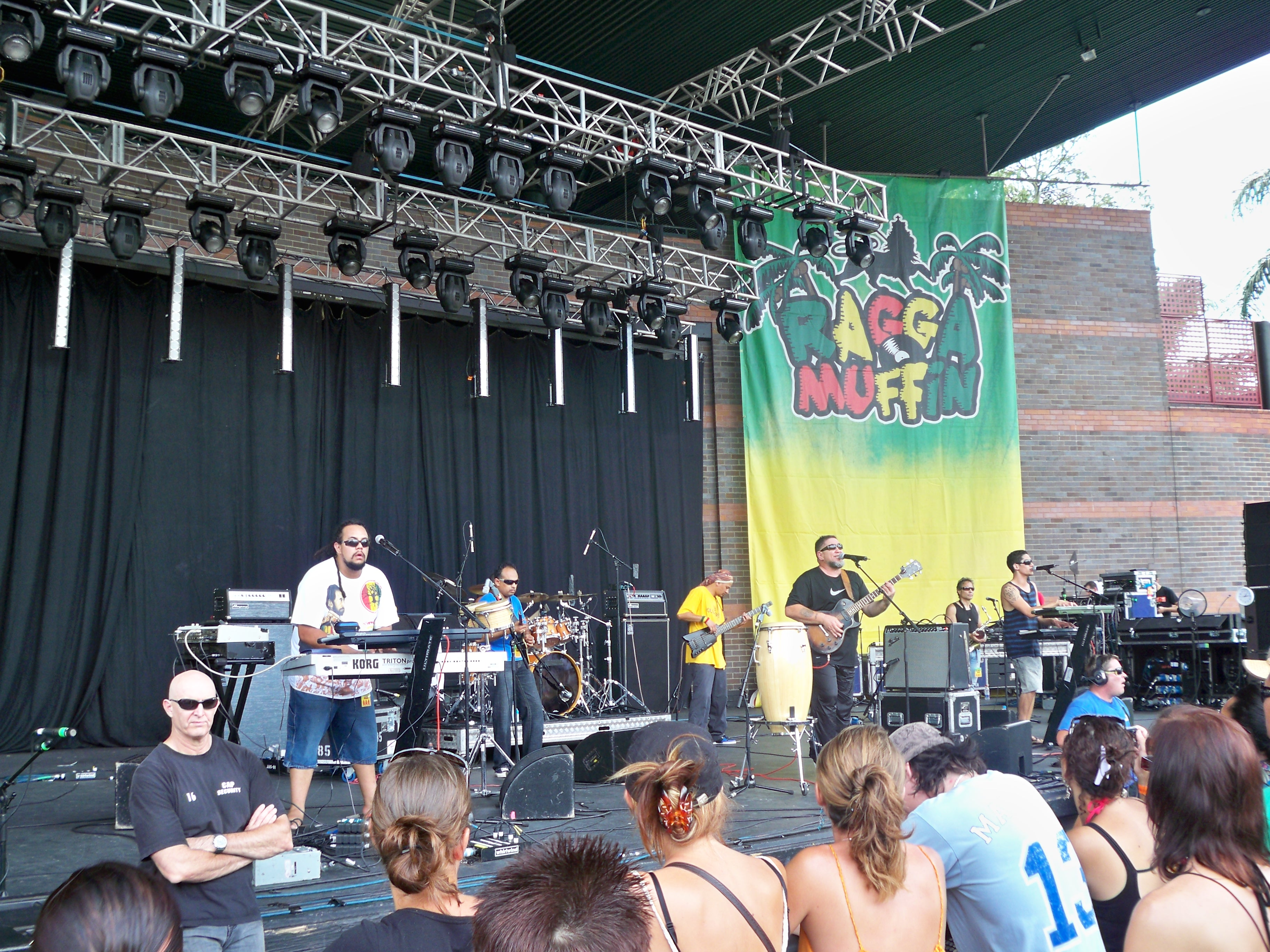
- House of Shem performing live at Brisbane, January 2010

Background information
- Origin: New Zealand
- Genre: Aotearoa Roots Reggae
- Years active: 2000–present
- Label: House of Shem Enterprises LTD
- Members: Te Omeka Perkins; Isaiah Perkins
- Past members: Carl Perkins
- Website: houseofshem.com

House of Shem is a roots reggae band from Aotearoa/New Zealand. They have had songs featured on the Conscious Roots compilations. In May 2008, their debut album, Keep Rising was released throughout New Zealand. It was released again in April 2009 throughout Australia and Hawaii.

In April 2010, House of Shem started recording their second album, Island Vibration, with engineer and producer Errol Brown who has worked with many well known reggae bands and artists such as Alton Ellis, Bob Marley & The Wailers, Gregory Isaacs, Peter Tosh and Ziggy Marley and The Melody Makers. The album was released in New Zealand on 14 February 2011.

In 2013, they released their third album, Harmony, on which they worked with Jamaican engineer Errol Brown.

== Band members ==
- Carl Perkins – vocals, producer (died on 9 May 2018 from bowel cancer).
- Te Omeka Perkins – vocals, producer
- Isaiah Perkins – vocals, producer

== Discography ==
=== Albums ===
Year	Title	Details	Peak chart positions
Year	Title	Details	NZ
2008	Keep Rising	Released: 26 May 2008; Label: Local Music; Catalogue: HOSCD001	38
2011	Island Vibration	Released: 14 February 2011; Label: House of Shem Music/Isaac/Universal; Catalogue: 938571	1
2013	Harmony	Released: 6 December 2013; Label: Isaac/Warner; Catalogue: 5419601602	24

=== Compilations ===
Year	Title	Label	Catalog number
2004	Conscious Roots	EMI	8636632
2005	Conscious Roots 2	Capitol	3495142
2006	Conscious Roots 3	Capitol	3774962
2007	Conscious Roots 4	Moving Productions	5197652
2009	Conscious Roots 2009	EMI	2655252
2015	Yemisi Riddim (Oneness Records Presents)	Oneness Records	–
