= Conscious Roots 2 =

Compilation album by Various Artists
- Released: 17 March 2005
- Recorded: Various Times
- Length: ?
- Label: EMI

Various Artists chronology
Conscious Roots (2004)	Conscious Roots 2 (2005)	Conscious Roots 3 (2006)

Conscious Roots 2 is a 2005 compilation album of roots reggae, compiled by David Allan and Prajna Moodley and published by Capitol Music. The album is the 2nd edition of the New Zealand series.

== Track listing ==
1. Dreams – House of Shem
2. One of These Days – Illphonics
3. This Here Reggae Music – Unity Pacific
4. So True – Black Seeds
5. Keep Rising – House of Shem
6. Forward Movement – Cornerstone Roots
7. Frisk Me Down – Katchafire
8. Whistling in the Dark – Kingites
9. Meaning of Life – Toki
10. Burning – Kora
11. Ernie – Fat Freddys Drop
12. All We Be – Trinity Roots
13. True Progress – The Midnights
14. Lost Your Soul – Hollie Smith
