= Henge (band) =

British band

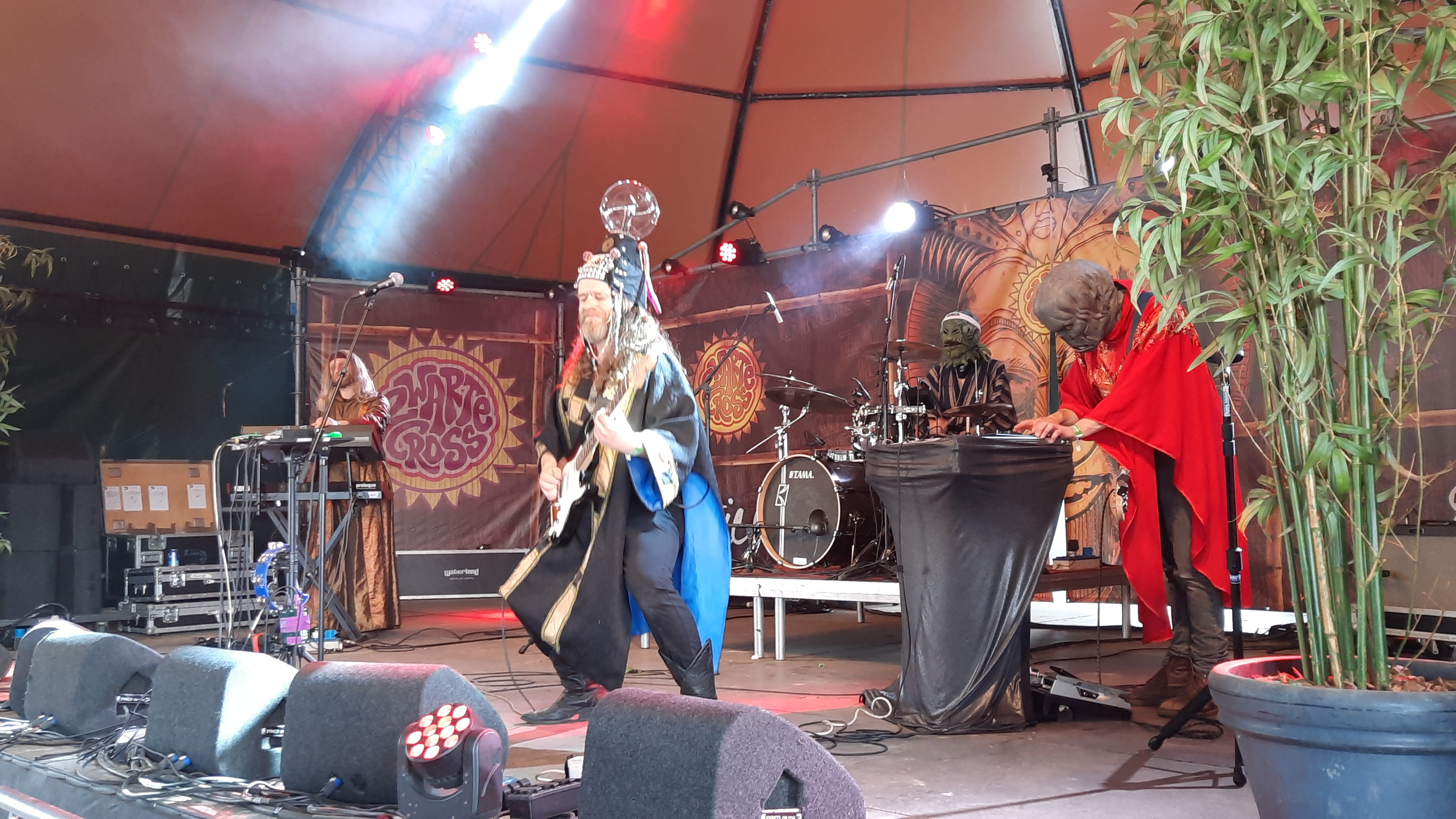
- Henge at Zwarte Cross, Netherlands, 2022

Background information
- Origin: Manchester
- Genres: Acid rock; art rock; avant-pop; electro; electronic rock; experimental rock; neo-psychedelia; psychedelic funk; psychedelic rock; synthwave; space rock
- Years active: 2015–present
- Website: hengemusic.com

Henge (stylised as HENGE) is a British rock band formed in Manchester in 2015. The band plays a type of electronic crossover rock which it calls Cosmic Dross whilst performing as the fictional characters Zpor, Goo, Sol and Nom.

== Career ==
Henge's first release was a five-track EP in July 2017, entitled Cosmic Dross. It was released on Love Love Records and, according to their agent's page, contains "electronic madness so unique and captivating that it firmly cemented their reputation with the alternative festival community".

Henge released their debut album, Attention Earth!, on 19 October 2018.

In 2026 it was announced that Henge would embark on a world tour, starting in 2027. This tour will include the band's first performances in North America. The tour will comprise of dates in the UK, Europe, Canada, United States and Mexico. Additional locations may be announced at a later date.

== Members ==
- Matthew Whitaker (performing as Zpor) – vocals and guitar
- Pete Turner (performing as Goo) – bass guitar and synth bass
- Roy Medhurst (performing as Sol, formerly Grok) – synthesizers
- Sam Draper (performing as Nom) – drums

== Discography ==
=== Singles and EPs ===
Year	Details	Chart positions	
Year	Details	UK	IRE
2017	Cosmic Dross	—	—
2018	In Praise of Water	—	—
2018	Indigo Dust	—	—
2019	Demilitarise	—	—
2019	Demilitarise Remixes	—	—
2020	Exo	—	—
2020	Get Outta Ma House	—	—
2023	Wanderlust	—	—
2023	Get A Wriggle On	—	—
2025	Ascending	—	—
2025	Slingshot/Hypersleep	—	—
2025	Ascending/Slingshot Remixes	—	—

=== Albums ===
Year	Album Title	Label	Chart positions	
Year	Album Title	Label	UK	IRE
2018	Attention Earth!	Platinum Rare	—	—
2020	ExoKosm	Cosmic Dross Records	—	—
2023	Alpha Test 4	Self-released	—	—
2025	Journey to Voltus B	Cosmic Dross Records	—	—
2027	HUMANS	Cosmic Dross Records	—	—

== Other projects ==
Starting in 2019, the band collaborated with artists Tom Eglington, Boo Cook (prolific artist for the British comic 2000 AD), and Phil Buckenham to produce a series of comics about the band. Comic #1 was released in September 2019, followed by #2 in September 2021, and #3 in October 2023.

Prior to Henge, Sam and Matthew were members of the Manchester band The Whiskycats.

== Tours ==
- Attention Earth! Tour (2018)
- Demilitarise Tour (2019)
- The Cosmic Dross Experiment (2019)
- Earth Garden, Malta (2022)
- Wanderlust Tour (2022)
- Alpha Test UK Tour (2023)
- Journey to Voltus B Tour, UK + EU (2025)
- Sounds of the Cosmos Tour (2026) — Joint headlining with Gong
- World Tour (2027) — including first North American shows

== Awards ==
Described as festival favourites, the band won "Live Act of the Year" at the 2018 Independent Festival Awards in Sheffield.

In 2022, Henge was awarded silver in the Best Music Video category by the Tokyo Film Awards for the video to the single "New Planet".
