= Go Back to the Zoo =

Dutch pop rock band

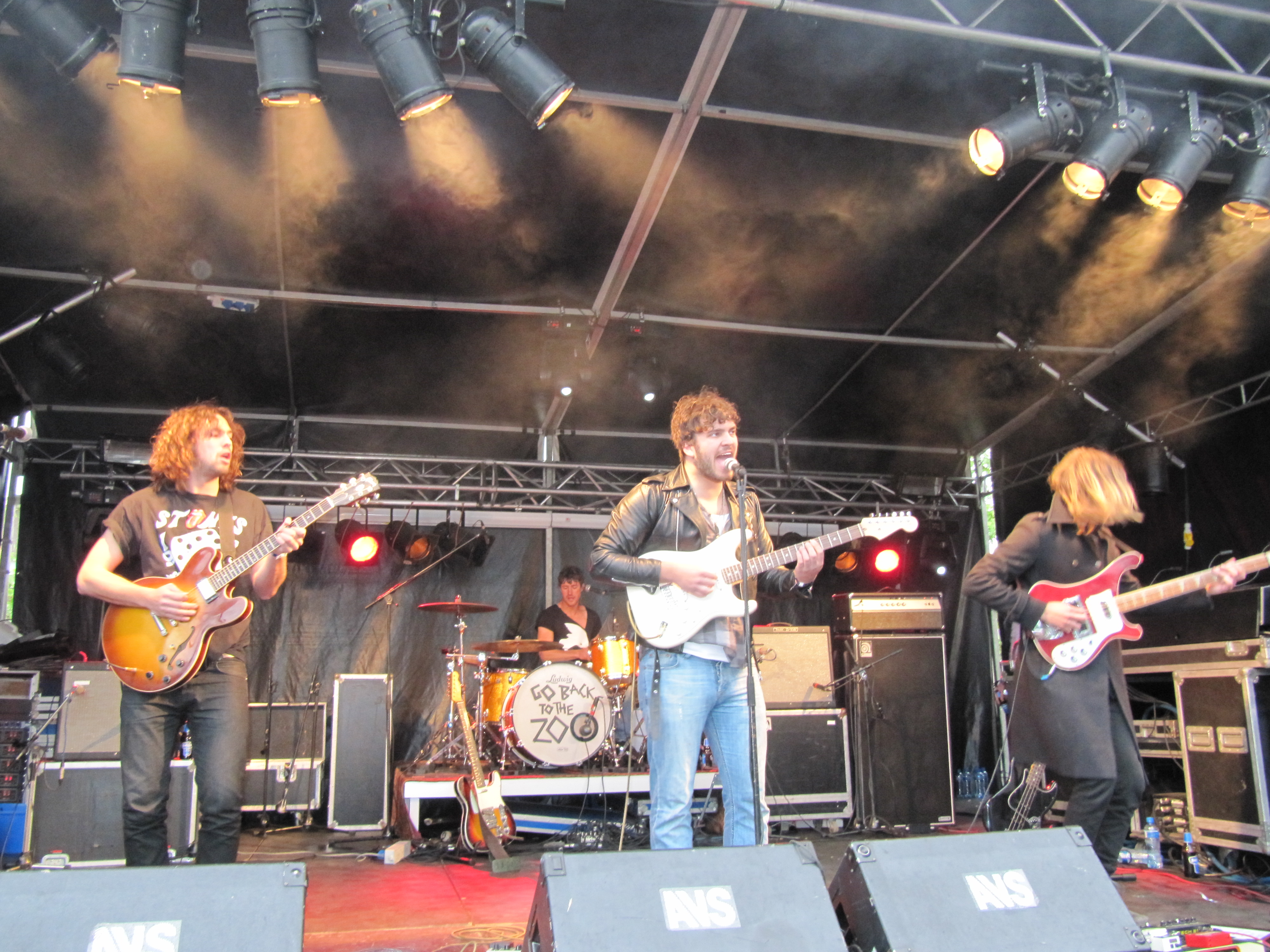
- Go Back to the Zoo live at Op De Tôffel 2010

Background information
- Origin: Nijmegen, the Netherlands
- Genres: Rock, britpop
- Years active: 2008–2016
- Members: Cas Hieltjes; Teun Hieltjes; Lars Kroon; Bram Kniest

Go Back to the Zoo, also known as GBTTZ was a Dutch pop rock band, formed in Nijmegen by brothers Cas (vocals) and Teun Hieltjes (guitar), and Bram Kniest (drum).

== Biography ==
After they moved to Amsterdam, they met Lars Kroon (bass guitar) waiting in a queue for a concert by The Strokes.

In 2008, the group self-released their eponymous debut EP. This record was produced by Torre Florim, lead singer of another Dutch rock band, De Staat. Their single ‘Beam Me Up’ was used by Nike for a worldwide campaign and after that, Go Back to the Zoo got signed to Universal Music and in May 2009 ‘Beam Me Up’ was released as their first official single. In December 2009 they released their second single ‘Electric’ with a video which features the bandmembers as musical transformers.

On Friday 13 August 2010 Go Back to the Zoo released their debut album called Benny Blisto.

'Beam Me Up' was re-released in 2011, after it was used in the promotion video a new season of the TV series Californication

On 6 April 2012 Go Back to the Zoo released their second album, Shake A Wave. The album was produced by JB Meijers and Dennis van Leeuwen. The release of the album was accompanied by a club tour through the Netherlands.

On Valentine's Day 2014 Go Back to the Zoo released their third album, ZOO. With charting at number 2 it was their highest charted record.

=== St. Tropez ===
On 4 January 2016 Go Back to the Zoo announced to stop after eight years. The band continued as St. Tropez and released their nameless debut album as this band in 2016. In St. Tropez bassplayer Kroon became the singer besides Hieltjes and the music of the band took a more radical approach in the direction of garage rock. In 2017 they released the four song EP ‘Debate’. In March 2018 the band released the single ‘Down’, followed by their second album in May along with a second single ‘I Got the Job’. This album continued stylistically the sound of the first album, though with a somewhat broader spectrum of sounds from soft sounding songs to more radical noisy compositions like the second single. As part of the promotion of this release the band has a one-month pop up live venue in the Amstel Passage inside Amsterdam Central Station where they had their album release gig on the first day and the following days organise gigs and collaborative recording sessions with befriended acts such as Yuri Landman, Janne Schra, The Vagary, Jungle by Night, Lucky Fonz III, Blue Crime, Those Foreign Kids, Iguana Death Cult, Mozes and the Firstborn, Jo Goes Hunting and others for the rest of the month. A Dutch tour is planned in the summer of 2018.

== Discography ==
Album title	Release date	Charting in the Dutch Album Top 100			Comments
Album title	Release date	Date of entry	Highest	Weeks	Comments
Benny Blisto	13-08-2010	21-08-2010	3	55	Gold
Shake a Wave	06-04-2012	14-04-2012	4	13	-
ZOO	14-02-2014	22-02-2014	2	4	-

=== Singles ===
Single	Release year	NL	Weeks
Beam Me Up	2010	82	1
Electric	2010	15	11
Hey DJ	2010	67	2
I'm The Night (See You Later)	2010	-	–
Smoking on the Balcony	2011	-	–
What If	2012	79	2
Charlene	2013	96	2
