= New Zealand top 50 singles of 2021 =

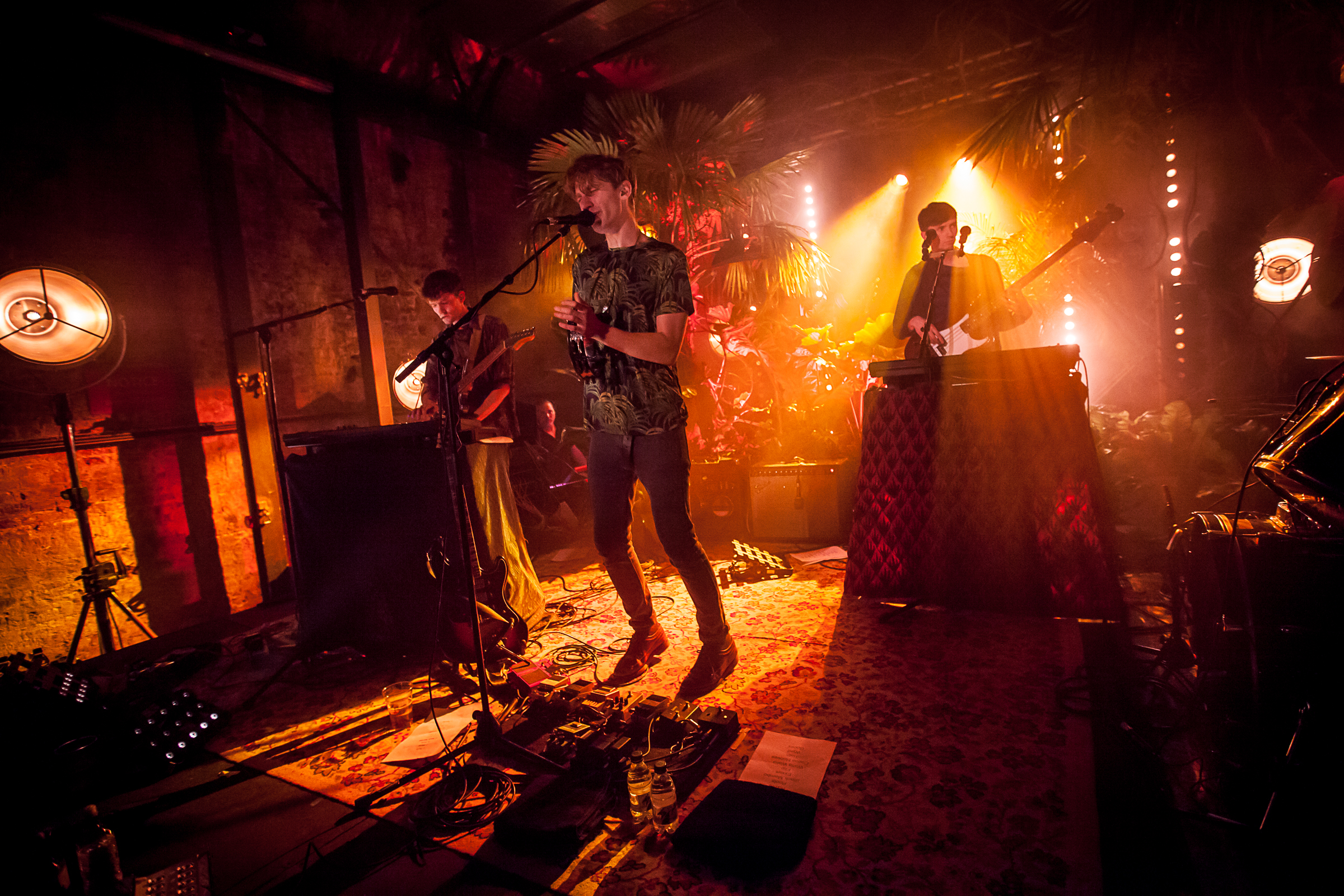
"Heat Waves" by British indie rock band Glass Animals was the top single of 2021

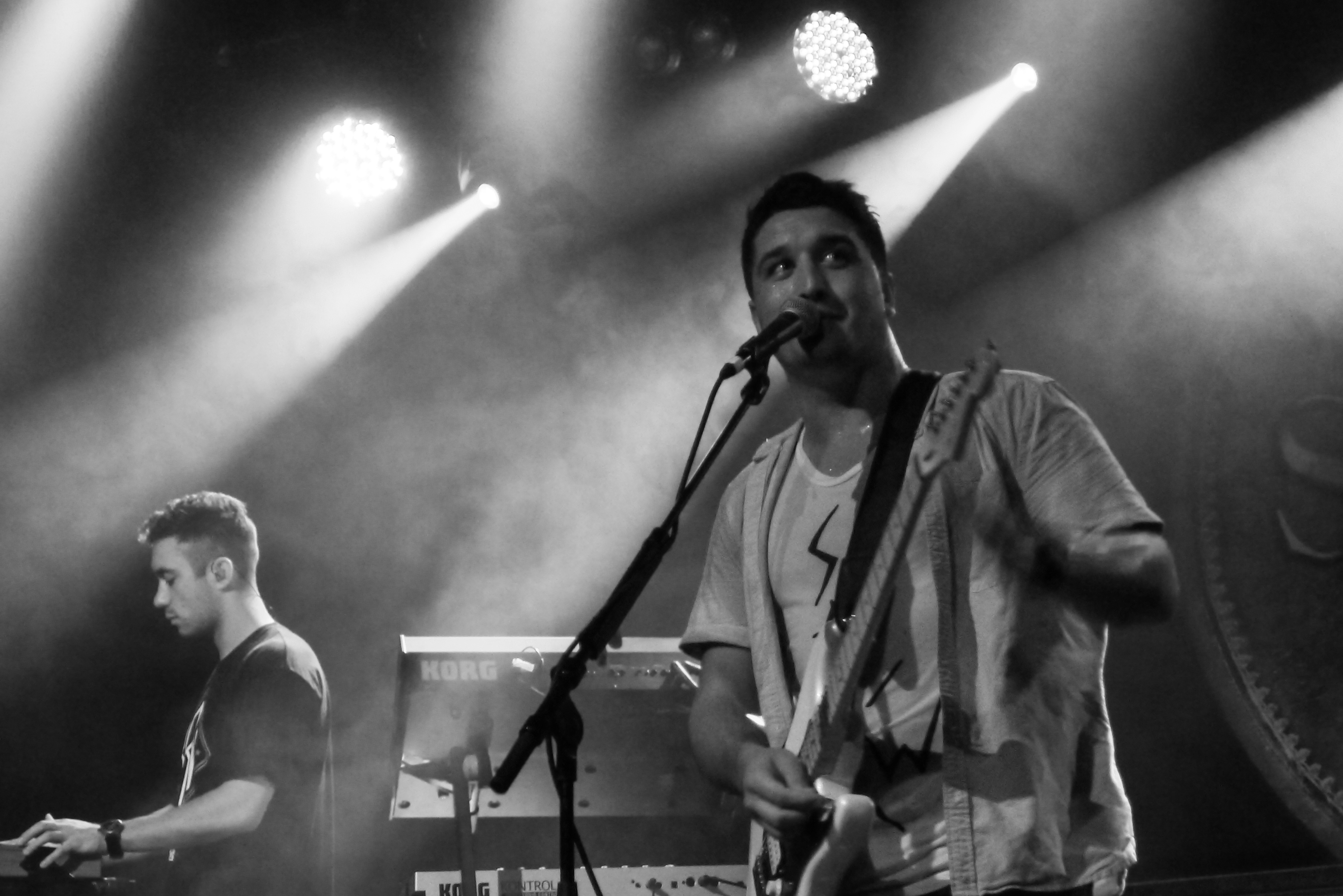
New Zealand band Six60 had seven songs chart in the top 50 singles of 2021, and also released the top song sung in Māori, "Pepeha"

This is a list of the top-selling singles in New Zealand for 2021 from the Official New Zealand Music Chart's end-of-year chart, compiled by Recorded Music NZ. Recorded Music NZ also published 2021 lists for two sub-charts, the top 20 singles released by New Zealand artists, and the top 20 singles primarily performed in Te Reo Māori.

== Chart ==
Key
† – Song of New Zealand origin (Note: Whether or not a song is of New Zealand origin is determined by the Recorded Music NZ.)

Rank	Artist	Song
1	Glass Animals	"Heat Waves"
2	Dua Lipa featuring DaBaby	"Levitating"
3	Olivia Rodrigo	"Drivers License"
4	L.A.B.	"Why Oh Why"
5	Doja Cat featuring SZA	"Kiss Me More"
6	L.A.B.	"In the Air"
7	Olivia Rodrigo	"Good 4 U"
8	The Kid Laroi and Justin Bieber	"Stay"
9	L.A.B.	"Controller"
10	Justin Bieber featuring Daniel Caesar and Giveon	"Peaches"
11	Ed Sheeran	"Bad Habits"
12	Fleetwood Mac	"Dreams"
13	Giveon	"Heartbreak Anniversary"
14	Silk Sonic	"Leave the Door Open"
15	Lil Nas X	"Montero (Call Me by Your Name)"
16	The Weeknd	"Save Your Tears"
17	Niko Walters featuring Kiana Ledé	"Not My Neighbour"
18	Six60	"All She Wrote"
19	The Kid Laroi	"Without You"
20	Masked Wolf	"Astronaut in the Ocean"
21	Six60	"Sundown"
22	Lil Nas X featuring Jack Harlow	"Industry Baby"
23	Elton John and Dua Lipa	"Cold Heart (Pnau remix)"
24	SZA	"Good Days"
25	The Weeknd	"Blinding Lights"
26	24kGoldn featuring Iann Dior	"Mood"
27	Drax Project featuring Six60	"Catching Feelings"
28	Olivia Rodrigo	"Deja Vu"
29	Joel Corry featuring MNEK	"Head & Heart"
30	Måneskin	"Beggin'"
31	Doja Cat	"Streets"
32	Russ Millions x Tion Wayne	"Body"
33	Six60	"Fade Away"
34	Kings featuring Sons of Zion	"Help Me Out"
35	Six60	"Don't Forget Your Roots"
36	Justin Bieber	"Anyone"
37	Tiësto	"The Business"
38	AJR	"Bang!"
39	Adele	"Easy on Me"
40	Harry Styles	"Watermelon Sugar"
41	Jawsh 685 x Jason Derulo	"Savage Love (Laxed – Siren Beat)"
42	Ariana Grande	"34+35"
43	Stan Walker	"Bigger"
44	Internet Money and Gunna featuring Don Toliver and Nav	"Lemonade"
45	Billie Eilish	"Happier Than Ever"
46	Justin Bieber featuring Chance the Rapper	"Holy"
47	Doja Cat	"Need to Know"
48	Six60	"Long Gone"
49	Olivia Rodrigo	"Traitor"
50	Six60	"The Greatest"

== Top 20 singles of 2021 by New Zealand artists ==
Rank	Artist	Song
1	L.A.B.	"Why Oh Why"
2	L.A.B.	"In the Air"
3	L.A.B.	"Controller"
4	Niko Walters featuring Kiana Ledé	"Not My Neighbour"
5	Six60	"All She Wrote"
6	Six60	"Sundown"
7	Drax Project featuring Six60	"Catching Feelings"
8	Six60	"Fade Away"
9	Kings featuring Sons of Zion	"Help Me Out"
10	Six60	"Don't Forget Your Roots"
11	Jawsh 685 x Jason Derulo	"Savage Love (Laxed – Siren Beat)"
12	Stan Walker	"Bigger"
13	Six60	"Long Gone"
14	Six60	"The Greatest"
15	L.A.B.	"Yes I Do"
16	Drax Project featuring Fetty Wap and AACACIA	"Firefly"
17	Sons of Zion featuring Jackson Owens	"Love on the Run"
18	Six60	"Pepeha"
19	Benee	"Glitter"
20	Muroki	"Wavy"

== Top 20 singles of 2021 sung in Te Reo Māori ==
Rank	Artist	Song
1	Six60	"Pepeha"
2	Ka Hao featuring Rob Ruha	"35"
3	Stan Walker featuring Ibanez Maeva	"Tua"
4	Sons of Zion featuring Jackson Owens	"He Aroha Hinemoa (Love on the Run)"
5	Stan Walker	"Matemateāone"
6	Muroki	"Rehurehu"
7	Rob Ruha	"Taera"
8	Katchafire	"Karawhiua / 100"
9	Stan Walker and the Levites	"He Kākano Āhau"
10	Lorde	"Te Ao Mārama (Solar Power)"
11	Stan Walker	"Tau Te Marire (Take It Easy)"
12	Dave Dobbyn	"Hine Ruhi (Slice of Heaven)"
13	Maimoa	"Utua"
14	Origin Roots Aotearoa (O.R.A.)	"Home / Ūkaipō"
15	Kings featuring Theia	"Pohewatia"
16	Hollie Smith featuring Don McGlashan	"Kōrukutia / Bathe in the River"
17	Drax Project	"Tukituki Te Manawa"
18	Maisey Rika	"Waitī Waitā"
19	Troy Kingi and the Nudge	"He Ōrite"
20	Maisey Rika	"Hiwa-i-te-Rangi"
