= New Zealand top 50 singles of 2020 =

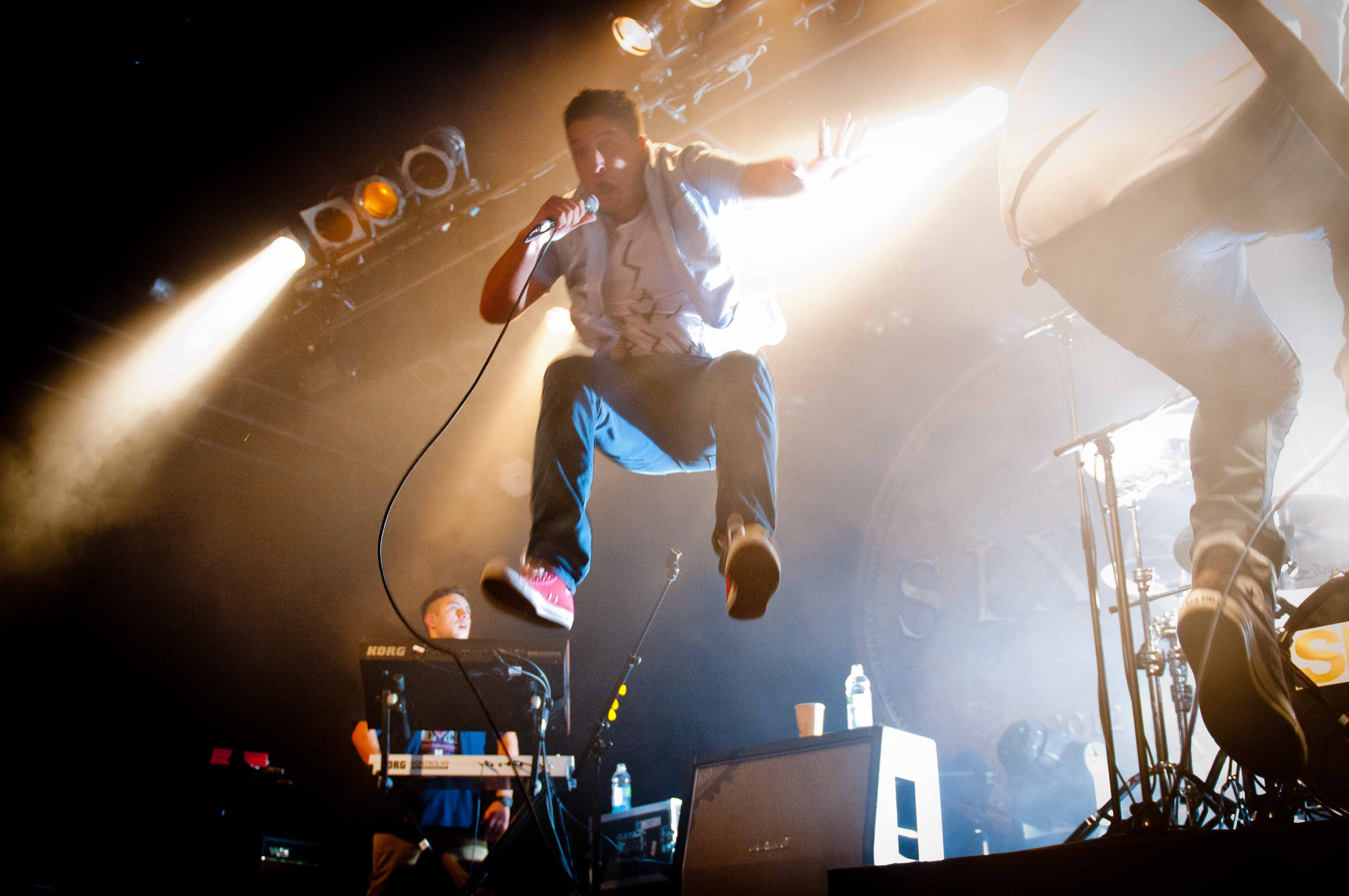
New Zealand band Six60 released five of the top 50 singles of 2020, as well as eight of the top 20 singles released by New Zealand artists

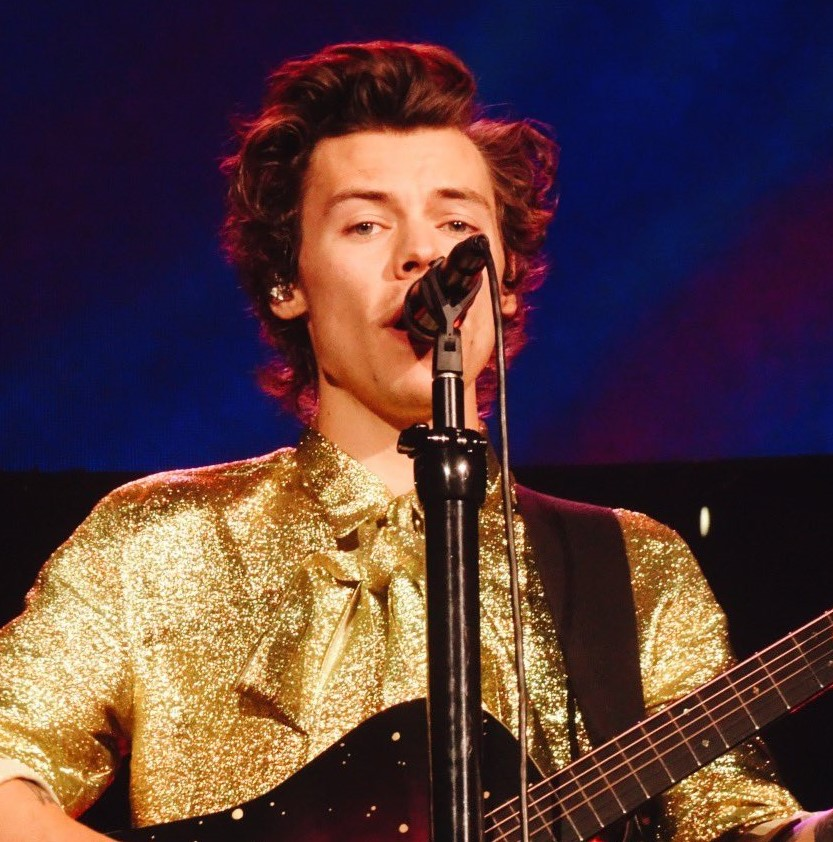
Three of English singer Harry Styles' singles were among the top 50 best performing singles of 2020

This is a list of the top-selling singles in New Zealand for 2020 from the Official New Zealand Music Chart's end-of-year chart, compiled by Recorded Music NZ. Recorded Music NZ also published a 2020 list for the top 20 singles released by New Zealand artists.

== Chart ==
Key
† – Song of New Zealand origin (Note: Whether or not a song is of New Zealand origin is determined by the Recorded Music NZ.)

Rank	Artist	Song
1	L.A.B.	"In the Air"
2	The Weeknd	"Blinding Lights"
3	Saint Jhn	"Roses"
4	Jawsh 685 x Jason Derulo	"Savage Love (Laxed – Siren Beat)"
5	Dua Lipa	"Don't Start Now"
6	Tones and I	"Dance Monkey"
7	DaBaby featuring Roddy Ricch	"Rockstar"
8	Benee	"Glitter"
9	Harry Styles	"Watermelon Sugar"
10	Drax Project featuring Six60	"Catching Feelings"
11	Roddy Ricch	"The Box"
12	Lewis Capaldi	"Before You Go"
13	Doja Cat	"Say So"
14	Six60	"Long Gone"
15	Justin Bieber featuring Quavo	"Intentions"
16	Benee featuring Gus Dapperton	"Supalonely"
17	Lewis Capaldi	"Someone You Loved"
18	Chris Brown and Young Thug	"Go Crazy"
19	Harry Styles	"Adore You"
20	L.A.B.	"Controller"
21	Post Malone	"Circles"
22	Powfu featuring Beabadoobee	"Death Bed"
23	Cardi B featuring Megan Thee Stallion	"WAP"
24	Six60	"The Greatest"
25	Maroon 5	"Memories"
26	24kGoldn featuring Iann Dior	"Mood"
27	Jack Harlow	"Whats Poppin"
28	Arizona Zervas	"Roxanne"
29	Surfaces	"Sunday Best"
30	Fleetwood Mac	"Dreams"
31	Lil Mosey	"Blueberry Faygo"
32	Six60	"Please Don't Go"
33	S1mba featuring DTG	"Rover"
34	Regard	"Ride It"
35	Topic featuring A7S	"Breaking Me"
36	Justin Bieber	"Yummy"
37	Ariana Grande and Justin Bieber	"Stuck with U"
38	Megan Thee Stallion	"Savage"
39	Trevor Daniel	"Falling"
40	Billie Eilish	"Everything I Wanted"
41	Future featuring Drake	"Life Is Good"
42	Brockhampton	"Sugar"
43	JP Saxe featuring Julia Michaels	"If the World Was Ending"
44	Billie Eilish	"Bad Guy"
45	Sam Fischer	"This City"
46	Eminem featuring Juice Wrld	"Godzilla"
47	Shaed and Zayn	"Trampoline"
48	Drake	"Toosie Slide"
49	Six60	"Raining"
50	Harry Styles	"Falling"

== Top 20 singles of 2020 by New Zealand artists ==
Rank	Artist	Song
1	L.A.B.	"In the Air"
2	Jawsh 685 x Jason Derulo	"Savage Love (Laxed – Siren Beat)"
3	Benee	"Glitter"
4	Drax Project featuring Six60	"Catching Feelings"
5	Six60	"Long Gone"
6	Benee featuring Gus Dapperton	"Supalonely"
7	L.A.B.	"Controller"
8	Six60	"The Greatest"
9	Six60	"Please Don't Go"
10	Six60	"Raining"
11	Six60	"Sundown"
12	Six60	"Never Enough"
13	Mitch James	"Sunday Morning"
14	Benee	"Soaked"
15	Drax Project featuring Hailee Steinfeld	"Woke Up Late"
16	L.A.B.	"Rocketship"
17	Stan Walker	"Bigger"
18	Sons of Zion	"Road Trip"
19	Six60	"Closer"
20	Sons of Zion	"Drift Away"
