= Come Home (Sons of Zion song) =

2019 single by Sons of Zion

Single by Sons of Zion

from the album First XV
- Released: 14 June 2019
- Genre: Pop
- Length: 3:14
- Label: Sons of Zion, Sony Music Entertainment New Zealand
- Songwriters: Matthew Sadgrove; Seth Haapu
- Producer: Matthew Sadgrove

Sons of Zion singles chronology
"Leave with Me" (2018)	"Come Home" (2019)	"Road Trip" (2019)

Music video
- "Come Home" (Lyric Video) on YouTube

"Come Home" is a song by New Zealand band Sons of Zion, released as a single in 2019. Intended as a follow-up to their hit single "Drift Away" (2018), the song was a success in New Zealand, receiving a gold certification by Recorded Music New Zealand.

== Background and composition ==
"Come Home" was a song that the band worked on for an extended time, and wanted to express the feeling of deciding whether or not to end a relationship. The song was written collaboratively by the members of the band, based on a tune created by Matthew Sadgrove on the guitar. The song also features writing by bandmember Caleb Haapu's brother Seth Haapu.

== Release and promotion ==
"Come Home" was released as a single on 14 June 2019. To promote the single, Sons of Zion performed Come Home Tour, an eight-date tour across New Zealand in August 2019.

== Critical reception ==
Kongfooey of muzic.net.nz likened "Come Home" to the band's previous single "Drift Away", praising the song's "tropical upbeat summer pop vibe", "sparse and crisp production" and the song's vocal harmonies, and felt that the band's incorporation of electro-pop and folk in addition to roots reggae was a "nice fusion that sets them apart".

== Credits and personnel ==
- Chris Chetland – mastering engineer
- Seth Haapu – songwriter
- Matthew Sadgrove – engineer, mixing engineer, producer, songwriter

== Charts ==
=== Weekly charts ===
Chart (2019)	Peak position
New Zealand Hot Singles (Recorded Music NZ)	3
New Zealand Artist Singles (Recorded Music NZ)	3

=== Year-end charts ===
Year-end chart performance for "Come Home"
Chart (2019)	Position
New Zealand Artist Singles (Recorded Music NZ)	20

== Certifications ==
Certifications for "Come Home"
Region	Certification	Certified units/sales
New Zealand (RMNZ)	2× Platinum	60,000^{‡}
^{‡} Sales+streaming figures based on certification alone.
