= First XV (album) =

2022 album by Sons of Zion

Compilation album by Sons of Zion
- Released: 28 October 2022
- Genres: Reggae; pop
- Length: 53:46
- Label: Sony Music New Zealand
- Producers: Matthew Sadgrove; Sons of Zion; Samuel Eriwata; Devin Abrams; Leo Coghini; Joel Latimer; Riapo Panapa

Sons of Zion chronology
Vantage Point (2018)	First XV (2022)

Singles from First XV
- 1. "Come Home" Released: 14 June 2019; 2. "Road Trip" Released: 15 November 2019; 3. "Crazy" Released: 27 November 2020; 4. "Love on the Run" Released: 4 June 2021; 5. "Come to Bed" Released: 29 July 2022

First XV is a compilation album released by New Zealand band Sons of Zion in October 2022, as their final release through Sony Music New Zealand. The album compiles songs from their albums Universal Love (2013), Vantage Point (2018), and other singles by the band released between 2014 and 2022.

== Production ==
The band began recording their fourth studio album to follow up Vantage Point (2018) in 2019 in Los Angeles, which they planned to release in early 2020. While the album never eventuated, the group began releasing singles from 2019, starting with "Come Home" (2019), "Road Trip" (2019) and "Break Up Song" (2020).

First XV compiles music released by Sons of Zion over the 15 years they were signed to Sony Music New Zealand. The album features four songs from the band's 2013 album Universal Love, three songs from their 2018 album Vantage Point, and eight singles not found on any of the band's albums: "Stuck on Stupid" (2014), "Fill Me Up" (2015), "I'm Ready" (2019), "Road Trip" (2019), "Crazy" (2020), "Love on the Run" (2021) and "Come to Bed" (2022).

== Release and promotion ==
Sons of Zion released "Come Home" in June 2019, following up from their hit song "Drift Away" from the album Vantage Point (2018). This was followed by "Road Trip" in November, and "Break Up Song" in September 2020, a song that was not featured on First XV. Both "Come Home" and "Road Trip" were hit songs in New Zealand, both receiving gold certifications from Recorded Music NZ. The band ended 2020 with the single "Crazy", which features a music video shot by band member Riapo Panapa in Los Angeles.

The band's June 2021 single "Love on the Run" was a commercial success in New Zealand. The song's music video was the most watched in New Zealand by a New Zealand artist for 2021, and was awarded the radio airplay song of the year at the 2021 Waiata Māori Music Awards. The band also released a Māori language version of the sung under the name "He Aroha Hinemoa" during Te Wiki o te Reo Māori in September 2021, which was also a commercial success. becoming one of the most successful songs sung in Māori for 2021 and 2022.

Three months before the release of the album, the band released the single "Come to Bed". A month after the release of First XV, Sons of Zion released their first music as independent musicians in 15 years, with the single "One Night".

== Track listing ==
First XV track listing
No.	Title	Writer(s)	Length
1.	"Drift Away"	Matthew Sadgrove	3:00
2.	"Love on the Run" (featuring Jackson Owens)	Sadgrove; Riapo Panapa	2:57
3.	"Be My Lady" (featuring Pieter T & Jah Maoli)	Curtis Wiringi; Joel Latimer; Kiapo Hanakahi; Pieter Tuhoro; Panapa; Samuel Eriwata	4:12
4.	"Stuck on Stupid" (featuring Israel Starr)	Sadgrove; Panapa; Eriwara	3:30
5.	"Come Home"	Sadgrove; Seth Haapu	3:15
6.	"Is That Enough" (featuring Aaradhna)	Aaradna Patel; Sammy Johnson	4:02
7.	"Road Trip"	Sadgrove	3:09
8.	"Fill Me Up"	Sadgrove; Panapa; Eriwata	3:57
9.	"Leave with Me"	Sadgrove; Panapa; Eriwata	3:42
10.	"Tell Her"	Panapa	4:17
11.	"Universal Love"	Jonson	4:44
12.	"Superman" (featuring Tomorrow People)	Avina Kelekolio; Latimer; Tuhoro; Panapa; Eriwata	3:18
13.	"I'm Ready"	Sadgrove; Panapa	3:40
14.	"Crazy"	Latimer; Sadgrove; Panapa; Eriwata	3:07
15.	"Come to Bed"	Latimer; Sadgrove; Panapa; Eriwata	2:58
Total length:			53:46

== Credits and personnel ==
- Devin Abrams – engineer (14), producer (14)
- Chris Chetland – mastering engineer (2, 5–6, 8–10, 13, 15)
- Leo Coghini – producer (14)
- Samuel Eriwata – engineer (11), producer (3, 6), songwriter (3–4, 8–9, 12, 14–15), vocals (8, 13)
- Thabani Gapara – horn (2)
- Kiapo Hanakahi – songwriter (3)
- Seth Haapu – songwriter (5)
- Sammy Johnson – songwriter (6, 11)
- Avina Kelekolio – performer (12), songwriter (12)
- Joel Latimer – engineer (3), keyboards (8), organ (13), piano (13), producer (3), songwriter (3, 12, 14–15)
- JAH Maoli – performer (3)
- Christian Mausia – horn (2)
- Jackson Owens – performer (2)
- Riapo Panapa – drums (8, 13), guitar (8, 13), producer (3), songwriter (2–4, 8–10, 12–15), vocals (8, 13)
- Aaradhna Patel – performer (6), songwriter (6)
- Matthew Sadgrove – bass (12), engineer, (1–2, 5, 8–9, 13), mixing engineer (1–2, 5–6, 8–9, 13, 15), producer (1, 5–7), songwriter (1–2, 4–5, 7–9, 13–15)
- Israel Starr – performer (4)
- Dylan Stewart – bass (8)
- Hayden Taylor – engineer (3, 11)
- Tomorrow People – performer (12)
- Pieter Tuhoro – performer (3), songwriter (3, 12)
- Sons of Zion – engineer (10, 12, 14), performer, producer (2, 10, 14–15)
- Curtis Wiringi – songwriter (3)

== Charts ==
=== Weekly charts ===
Weekly chart performance for First XV
Chart (2022–2023)	Peak position
New Zealand Albums (RMNZ)	9

=== Year-end charts ===
Year-end chart performance for First XV
Chart (2023)	Position
New Zealand Albums (RMNZ)	34

== Certifications and sales ==
Certifications and sales for First XV
Region	Certification	Certified units/sales
New Zealand (RMNZ)	2× Platinum	30,000^{‡}
^{‡} Sales+streaming figures based on certification alone.

== Release history ==
Release dates and formats for First XV
Region	Date	Format(s)	Label(s)	Ref.
Various	28 October 2022	CD; digital download; streaming	Sony Music New Zealand	
