= Help Me Out (disambiguation) =

"Help Me Out" is a 2017 song by Maroon 5.

Help Me Out may also refer to:

- "Help Me Out" (Kings song), from Raplist (2021)
- "Help Me Out", song by Bunny Walters (1978)
- "Help Me Out", song by Saga from Silent Knight (1980)
- "Help Me Out", single by the Clarks from I'll Tell You What Man... (1988)
- "Help Me Out", song by Christian rock band Superchic[k] from Karaoke Superstars (2001)
- "Help Me Out", song by Black Rob from The Black Rob Report (2005)
- "Help Me Out", single by Suzie McNeil from Rock-n-Roller (2008)
- "Help Me Out", song by Crystal Kay from Color Change! (2008)
- "Help Me Out", song by The Rocket Summer from Zoetic (2016)

== See also ==
- "All These Things That I've Done", song by American rock band The Killers with common lyric of "you gotta help me out"
