= Vantage Point (Sons of Zion album) =

2018 album by Sons of Zion

Studio album by Sons of Zion
- Released: 11 May 2018
- Genre: Reggae; pop
- Length: 44:11
- Label: Sony Music New Zealand
- Producer: Matthew Sadgrove; Samuel Eriwata; Joel Latimer; Riapo Panapa

Sons of Zion chronology
The Jukebox Suite (2017)	Vantage Point (2018)	First XV (2022)

Singles from Vantage Point
- 1. "Is That Enough" Released: 21 July 2017; 2. "Drift Away" Released: 16 March 2018; 3. "So Bright" Released: August 2018; 4. "Leave with Me" Released: November 2018

Vantage Point is the second studio album released by New Zealand band Sons of Zion. It was released in May 2018, after the band's song "Drift Away" became a hit in New Zealand earlier that year. The album debuted at number 18 in New Zealand and was a sleeper hit, becoming platinum certified in New Zealand two years later.

== Production ==
By 2015, Sons of Zion's line-up stabilised, after bassist Dylan Stewart left and Caleb Haapu of the band L40 joined. Over the course of 2015 and 2016, the band released several one-off singles, "I'm Ready" (2015), "Fill Me Up" (2015), "Hungover" (2016) and "Now" (2016), after noticing a shift away from album-focused music to individual tracks as streaming became more popular. While the band actively toured globally, members of the band felt that Sons of Zion lacked as clear a direction, which led to a reduced musical output.

Recording for Vantage Point began three years before its release, and it was the band's first album in five years. The band constructed their own studio, No Filter Studios, and bandmember Matthew Sadgrove began working more actively as a music producer, working with groups such as Maimoa, producing their song "Wairua" (2017).

On 28 July 2017, the band released The Jukebox Suite, an extended play that compiled songs that the band were unsure would fit with the sound of their upcoming album. The EP was musically different to the band's previous output, focusing on pop and soul music. "Is That Enough", a duet with New Zealand R&B singer Aaradhna, was released as single a week prior to the album's release, and was a commercial success in New Zealand, becoming one of the top 20 biggest songs of the year by a New Zealand artist for both 2017 and 2018. "Is That Enough" and another song from the EP, "In the Sky", were both included on Vantage Point.

Before the release of Vantage Point, the members of Sons of Zion decided to quit their jobs to focus solely on releasing music. The album featured a single of genres, including rock and pop inspired songs in addition to their typical reggae sound.

== Release and promotion ==
"Drift Away" was released as the second single from the album in March 2018. While the band were unsure how an acoustic pop song would perform on New Zealand radio, the song was a success, becoming the band's best performing single to date. The album was released two months later on 11 May 2018. The iTunes version of the album compiled three additional songs as bonus tracks, "Fill Me Up", "I'm Ready" and "Now" featuring Slip-On Studio, all of which had been released as singles in 2015 or 2016.

The band promoted the album with a world tour beginning in June 2018, followed by a New Zealand tour in August. "So Bright" was released as a single in August coinciding with the start of their domestic New Zealand tour, and ended the year by releasing "Leave with Me" as a single in November.

== Critical reception ==
Anzel Singh of NZ Musician reviewed the album positively, describing the work as channelling "warm feelings of being in the sun and on top of the world", while feeling that Sons Of Zion "stay true to the tone of the record which embodies living life to the fullest and making it an adventure". Shelleysketch of muzic.net.nz described the album as "vocally very strong", feeling that the R&B and soul-inspired vocals created a "smooth relaxing flow" throughout the album.

== Commercial reception ==
The album debuted at 18 on the New Zealand albums charts, and only spent one week in the top 40 albums chart. The album also debuted at number nine in the United States on the Billboard Reggae Albums chart. Despite the album's slower initial success in New Zealand, Vantage Point performed well over time; becoming one of the top performing albums by a New Zealand artist for 2018, 2019 and 2020. Vantage Point was certified gold in March 2019, and a platinum certification in May 2020.

== Track listing ==
Vantage Point track listing
No.	Title	Writer(s)	Length
1.	"Vantage Point"	Matthew Sadgrove; Riapo Panapa	3:37
2.	"In the Sky"	Sadgrove; Panapa	3:41
3.	"Early in the Morning" (featuring Fiji)	George Veikoso; Sadgrove; Panapa	4:01
4.	"Mash It Up" (featuring Israel Starr)	Israel Buchanan; Sadgrove	3:43
5.	"So Bright"	Sadgrove; Panapa	3:40
6.	"Same Old Me"	Sadgrove; Panapa	3:57
7.	"Is That Enough" (featuring Aaradhna)	Aaradna Patel; Sammy Johnson	4:03
8.	"Drift Away"	Sadgrove	3:00
9.	"Lessons"	Panapa	3:43
10.	"Black Hole"	Sadgrove	3:17
11.	"Leave with Me"	Sadgrove; Panapa; Samuel Eriwata	3:42
12.	"Drift Away – Remix"	Sadgrove	3:27
Total length:			44:11

iTunes bonus tracks
No.	Title	Writer(s)	Length
13.	"Fill Me Up"	Sadgrove; Panapa; Eriwata	3:56
14.	"I'm Ready"	Sadgrove; Panapa	3:39
15.	"Now" (featuring Slip-On Studio)	Kehua	3:28
Total length:			55:14

== Credits and personnel ==
Credits adapted from Tidal.

- Chris Chetland – mastering engineer (1–7, 9–11)
- Samuel Eriwata – producer (2, 7, 11), songwriter (11)
- Fiji – featured musician (3), songwriter (3)
- Sammy Johnson – songwriter (7)
- Joel Latimer – producer (2),
- Matthew Sadgrove – producer (2, 7–8, 12), songwriter (1–6, 8, 10–12), engineer (1, 3–6, 8–12), mixing engineer (1–12)
- Aaradhna Patel – featured musician (7), songwriter (7)
- Riapo Panapa – producer (2), songwriter (1–3, 5–6, 9, 11)
- Israel Starr – featured musician (4), songwriter (4)
- Sons of Zion – performing artist (1–12), remixer (12)

== Charts ==
Weekly chart performance for Vantage Point
Chart (2018)	Peak position
New Zealand Albums (RMNZ)	18
US Reggae Albums (Billboard)	9

== Certifications and sales ==
Region	Certification	Certified units/sales
New Zealand (RMNZ)	Platinum	15,000^{‡}
^{‡} Sales+streaming figures based on certification alone.

== Release history ==
Release dates and formats for Vantage Point
Region	Date	Format(s)	Label(s)	Ref.
Various	11 May 2018	CD; digital download; streaming	Sony Music New Zealand	
