= Drax Project (album) =

2019 album by Drax Project

Studio album by Drax Project
- Released: 27 September 2019
- Genre: Pop
- Length: 32:46
- Label: Drax Project, Universal
- Producer: Devin Abrams; Jordan Palmer; Rogét Chahayed; Jacob Ray; SmarterChild; Kyle Kelso; Taylor Dextor; Wes Singerman

Drax Project chronology
Noon (Acoustic) (2019)	Drax Project (2019)	Diamond (2022)

Singles from Drax Project
- 1. "Woke Up Late" Released: 21 January 2019; 2. "All This Time" Released: 14 June 2019; 3. "Catching Feelings" Released: 4 September 2019; 4. "Relax" Released: 7 February 2020

Drax Project is the debut studio album by New Zealand band Drax Project, released in September 2019. The album follows the release of their single "Woke Up Late" (2017), which was re-released in early 2019 as a new version featuring Hailee Steinfeld. The band's collaboration with Six60, "Catching Feelings", was released as a single just prior to the album, and became a hit in Australia and New Zealand.

== Production ==
The album was written and recorded primarily between 2017 and 2019. Many of the songs are inspired by their experiences of working full-time jobs while moonlighting as musicians. The album features four songs from the band's 2018 extended play Noon, including a new version of their single "Woke Up Late" featuring Hailee Steinfeld, and seven new songs. Most of the album's recording sessions were held in Los Angeles.

== Release and promotion ==
The first single released from the album was "Woke Up Late" featuring Hailee Steinfeld, released in January 2019. Steinfeld was introduced to the original version of the song after the band toured with American singer Camila Cabello, and a member of Cabello's team showed the song to Steinfeld, who loved it. The "Woke Up Late" re-release was followed by "All This Time" in June, and a collaboration with New Zealand band Six60, "Catching Feelings" in September. After the release of the album, the song "Relax" was released as a single in February 2020. "Catching Feelings" was a hit in both Australia and New Zealand, and was certified 5× Platinum in New Zealand and double platinum in Australia.

== Track listing ==
Drax Project track listing
No.	Title	Writer(s)	Length
1.	"Woke Up Late" (featuring Hailee Steinfeld)	Ben O'Leary; Devin Abrams; Matt Beachen; Sam Thomson; Shaan Singh	3:01
2.	"Prefer"	O'Leary; Abrams; Beachen; Thomson; Singh	2:52
3.	"Smart Love"	O'Leary; Abrams; Beachen; Thomson; Sarah Solovay; Singh	2:37
4.	"Relax"	O'Leary; Brandon Skeie; Jordan Palmer; Beachen; Thomson; Singh	2:57
5.	"Natural Selection"	O'Leary; Jacob Ray; Beachen; Rogét Chahayed; Thomson; Singh	2:44
6.	"Brain"	Aaron Zuckerman; O'Leary; Ferras Alqaisi; Beachen; Thomson; Singh	2:39
7.	"Holiday"	O'Leary; Beachen; Remy Gautreau; Richard Markowitz; Thomson; Singh	2:48
8.	"Only Us"	O'Leary; Abrams; Beachen; Thomson; Singh	2:37
9.	"Toto"	O'Leary; Abrams; Beachen; Thomson; Singh	3:08
10.	"All This Time"	O'Leary; Beachen; Thomson; Singh; Vasilys Papageorgiou	3:45
11.	"Catching Feelings" (featuring Six60)	O'Leary; Abrams; Marlon Gerbes; Matiu Walters; Beachen; Thomson; Singh	3:38
Total length:			32:46

== Credits and personnel ==
Credits adapted from Tidal.

- Devin Abrams – co-producer (3–4, 6), producer (1–2, 9), songwriting (1–3, 8–9, 11)
- Ferras Alqaisi – songwriting (6)
- Matt Beachen – drums (1, 3–7), songwriting (1–11)
- Rogét Chahayed – producer (5, 10), songwriting (5)
- Taylor Dextor – producer (10)
- Remy Gautreau – songwriting (7)
- Chris Gehringer – mastering engineer (1, 3–6, 10)
- Marlon Gerbes – songwriting (11)
- Serban Ghenea – mixing (1)
- Kyle Kelso – producer (8)
- Richard Markowitz – songwriting (7)
- Tony Maserati – mixing (4–6, 10)
- Ben O'Leary – bass guitar (1, 3–7), songwriting (1–11)
- Jordan Palmer – mixing (3), producer (3–4, 6), songwriting (4)
- Vasilys Papageorgiou – songwriting (10)
- Jacob Ray – producer (5), songwriting (5)
- Wes Singerman – producer (10)
- Shaan Singh – songwriting (1–11), vocals
- Six60 – featured artist (11)
- Brandon Skeie – songwriting (4)
- Sarah Solovay – songwriting (3)
- SmarterChild – producer (7)
- Hailee Steinfeld – vocals (1)
- Sam Thomson – bass (vocal) (1, 3–7), songwriting (1–11)
- Matiu Walters – songwriting (11)
- Aaron Zuckerman – songwriting (6)

== Charts ==
=== Weekly charts ===
Weekly chart performance for Drax Project
Chart (2019)	Peak position
New Zealand Albums (RMNZ)	2

=== Year-end charts ===
Year-end chart performance for Drax Project
Chart (2020)	Position
New Zealand Albums (RMNZ)	17
Chart (2021)	Position
New Zealand Albums (RMNZ)	30

== Certifications ==
Certifications for Drax Project
Region	Certification	Certified units/sales
New Zealand (RMNZ)	2× Platinum	30,000^{‡}
^{‡} Sales+streaming figures based on certification alone.

== Release history ==
Release dates and formats for Drax Project
Region	Date	Format(s)	Label(s)	Ref.
New Zealand	27 September 2019	CD; digital download; streaming	Drax Project, Universal	
