= Atmosphere (Drax Project song) =

2023 single by Drax Project

Single by Drax Project

from the album Upside
- Language: English
- Released: 27 April 2023
- Genre: Pop
- Length: 3:14
- Label: Drax Project; EMI Music Australia; Avex Trax
- Songwriters: Aaron Zuckerman; Ben O'Leary; Ferras Alqaisi; Matt Beachen; Sam Thomson; Shaan Singh
- Producers: Cory Enemy; Drax Project; Neil MacLeod

Drax Project singles chronology
"Gameboy Color" (2022)	"Atmosphere" (2023)	"Disrespect" (2023)

Music video
- "Atmosphere" on YouTube

"Atmosphere" is a song by New Zealand band Drax Project. Originally written in 2019 in Los Angeles in writing sessions with Ferras, the band delayed the release of the song until 2023, due to the COVID-19 pandemic. The single's release was the group's first work released through EMI Music Australia and Japanese record label Avex Trax.

== Background and composition ==
The song was first written by Drax Project in the Hollywood Hills of Los Angeles with songwriter Ferras, during their first overseas trip in 2019. The song was written with a hopeful message, of picking yourself up when you feel beaten down by the world, and knowing your own abilities.

The song sat unfinished for years, as Drax Project were unsatisfied with the track. Eventually, the band members felt that the song had taken on new meaning after the COVID-19 pandemic, and that 2023 was an appropriate time to release the song, as people had begun feeling more optimistic about the world again. The song's recording was finished in New Zealand. The band felt that the song was finally completed after producers Cory Enemy and Neil McLeod worked together on the final stages of the song.

"Atmosphere" is the first song released from the band's upcoming second album.

== Release ==
"Atmosphere" was released as a single on 27 April 2013, at the same time as a music video was released for the song, by Australian director Josh Harris. The single also paired with the announcement of the band signing with EMI Music Australia and Japanese label Avex Trax. Vocalist Shaan Singh had learnt Japanese at high school, and began learning again as the band prepared for their debut in the country.

Drax Project performed a live acoustic version of "Atmosphere" on New Zealand radio station The Edge in May.

== Credits and personnel ==
Credits adapted from Tidal.

- Ferras Alqaisi – songwriter
- Matt Beachen – songwriter
- Drax Project – performer, producer, vocals
- Cory Enemy – producer
- Neil MacLeod – producer
- Randy Merrill – mastering engineer
- Tom Norris – mixer
- Ben O'Leary – songwriter
- Shaan Singh – songwriter
- Sam Thomson – songwriter
- Aaron Zuckerman – songwriter

== Charts ==
Chart (2023)	Peak position
New Zealand Hot Singles (Recorded Music NZ)	5
New Zealand Artist Singles (Recorded Music NZ)	13
