= All This Time (Drax Project song) =

2019 single by Drax Project

Single by Drax Project

from the album Drax Project
- Released: 12 June 2019
- Genre: Pop
- Length: 3:45
- Label: Drax Project, Universal Music New Zealand
- Songwriters: Benjamin Daniel Harold O'Leary; Matthew David Beveridge Beachen; Samuel Jacob Henry Thomson; Shaan Singh; Vasilys Papageorgiou

Drax Project singles chronology
"Woke Up Late" (2019)	"All This Time" (2019)	"Catching Feelings" (2019)

Music video
- "All This Time" on YouTube

"All This Time" is a song by New Zealand band Drax Project. A song that had been a part of the band's live performance set for years, it was released as a single from their debut album Drax Project in June 2019.

== Background and composition ==
"All This Time" was inspired by songs the band had covered in their early days as a band which had large drops. The song was one of the earliest the band had written, and became a staple of the band's live set since 2017. The band had difficulty recording the song, as the energy from the band's live shows did not translate well to the song.

== Release ==
The song was released on 12 June 2019. In August 2021, New Zealand musician Lee Mvtthews released a remix of the song.

== Critical reception ==
The song was nominated for the Aotearoa Music Award for Single of the Year at the 2019 New Zealand Music Awards, losing to "Soaked" by Benee

== Credits and personnel ==
Credits adapted from Tidal.

- Matt Beachen – songwriting
- Drax Project – performance
- Rogét Chahayed – producer
- Taylor Dextor – producer
- Chris Gehringer – mastering engineer
- Tony Maserati – mixing
- Ben O'Leary – songwriting
- Vasilys Papageorgiou – songwriting
- Wes Singerman – producer
- Shaan Singh – songwriting, vocals
- Sam Thomson – songwriting

== Charts ==
=== Weekly charts ===
Chart (2019)	Peak position
New Zealand (Recorded Music NZ)	21

=== Year-end charts ===
Chart (2019)	Position
New Zealand Artists (Recorded Music NZ)	9

== Certifications ==
Certifications for "All This Time"
Region	Certification	Certified units/sales
New Zealand (RMNZ)	2× Platinum	60,000^{‡}
^{‡} Sales+streaming figures based on certification alone.
