= Love on the Run (Sons of Zion song) =

2021 single by Sons of Zion

Single by Sons of Zion featuring Jackson Owens

from the album First XV
- Released: 4 June 2021
- Genre: pop; soul
- Length: 2:57
- Label: Sons of Zion, Sony Music Entertainment New Zealand
- Songwriters: Matthew Sadgrove; Riapo Panapa

Sons of Zion singles chronology
| "Crazy" (2020) | "Love on the Run" (2021) | "Come to Bed" (2021) |

Jackson Owens singles chronology
| "Love on the Run" (2021) | "Better with You" (2021) |

Music video
- "Love on the Run" on YouTube

"Love on the Run" is a song by New Zealand band Sons of Zion, performed in collaboration with singer Jackson Owens, released as a single in June 2021. In September 2021 for Te Wiki o te Reo Māori, the band re-recorded the song as "He Aroha Hinemoa / Love on the Run". Both the English and Māori language versions of the song were hits in New Zealand.

== Background and composition ==
Singer Jackson Owens joined Sons of Zion as a touring musician in 2019. Sons of Zion member Matthew Sadgrove wrote "Love on the Run" with Owens in mind, as the song suited his vocal range and style. The song was the first time Jackson Owens performed as a lead vocalist. "Love on the Run" was written to have a summer-feel, with elements of both pop and soul music, and incorporates a horn section, performed by Christian Mausia and Thabani Gapara.

== Release and promotion ==
"Love on the Run" was released as a single on 4 June 2021, through Sony Music Entertainment New Zealand. The band translated the song into Māori with help from Tawaroa Kawana of the band Maimoa, and released this version under the name "He Aroha Hinemoa" during Te Wiki o te Reo Māori in September 2021. The Māori language version references the story of Hinemoa and Tūtānekai.

"Love on the Run" was a commercial success in New Zealand. The song's music video was the most watched in New Zealand by a New Zealand artist for 2021, and was awarded the radio airplay song of the year at the 2021 Waiata Māori Music Awards. "He Aroha Hinemoa" was also a commercial success, becoming one of the most successful songs sung in Māori for 2021 and 2022.

The song was featured on the band's 2022 compilation album First XV.

== Credits and personnel ==
Credits adapted from Tidal.

- Chris Chetland – mastering engineer
- Thabani Gapara – horn
- Christian Mausia – horn
- Jackson Owens – performer
- Riapo Panapa – lyricist, composer
- Matthew Sadgrove – lyricist, composer, engineer, mixing engineer
- Sons of Zion – performer

== Charts ==
=== Weekly charts ===
| Chart (2021) | Peak position |
|---|---|
| New Zealand (Recorded Music NZ) | 15 |
| New Zealand Te Reo Māori Singles (Recorded Music NZ): "He Aroha Hinemoa / Love on the Run" | 3 |

=== Year-end charts ===
| Chart (2021) | Position |
|---|---|
| New Zealand Artist Charts (Recorded Music NZ) | 17 |
| Chart (2022) | Position |
| New Zealand Artist Charts (Recorded Music NZ) | 14 |

== Certifications ==
Certifications for "Love on the Run"
| Region | Certification | Certified units/sales |
|---|---|---|
| New Zealand (RMNZ) | 3× Platinum | 90,000^{‡} |
| New Zealand (RMNZ) He Aroha Hinemoa / Love on the Run | Gold | 15,000^{‡} |
^{‡} Sales+streaming figures based on certification alone.

== Release history ==
Release dates and formats for "Love on the Run"
| Region | Date | Edition | Format(s) | Label(s) | Ref. |
|---|---|---|---|---|---|
| Various | 4 June 2021 | Original | Digital download; streaming | Sony | |
| Various | 2 September 2021 | Māori language version | Digital download; streaming | Sony | |
