= Niko Walters =

- Born: Nikora Walters; Auckland, New Zealand
- Genres: Soul; R&B; hip-hop; pop
- Occupations: Singer; songwriter
- Instruments: Vocals; electric guitar
- Years active: 2019–present
- Labels: Universal Music New Zealand, Ricochet Records
- Website: www.nikowalters.com

Nikora "Niko" Walters is a New Zealand contemporary soul and R&B musician. Debuting in 2019, Walters is best known for the "Not My Neighbour" (2020), which was certified double platinum and was one of the top singles of 2021 in New Zealand. Walters released his debut album Escape in 2020, followed by White Flag Waves in 2022.

== Biography ==
Walters grew up in Auckland. Of Māori descent, he has whakapapa to the Northland tribes of Te Aupōuri, Te Rarawa and Ngāpuhi. He learnt guitar socially from family members, never receiving formal lessons, and learnt to produce songs using a pirated copy of audio software FruityLoops. In high school, Walters took part in kapa haka and Samoan cultural groups.

He first considered pursuing music while on an OE (working holiday) in London. While there, Walters spent a week writing and recording a mixtape, which gained traction on SoundCloud. On returning to New Zealand, he signed with Universal Music New Zealand in early 2019.

Walters released his first singles, "Moving On" and "Together" in mid-2019, and toured New Zealand as an opening act for Stan Walker. In 2020, Walters was an opening act for New Zealand band Six60's performance at Western Springs Stadium, and later that year released his debut album Escape. A single from the album, "Not My Neighbour", was a hit in New Zealand, becoming one of the New Zealand top 50 singles of 2021. In 2021, the song was re-released as a single, in a remixed version featuring American singer Kiana Ledé. Walters opened for Six60 a second time in 2021, to their Eden Park performance in front of a crowd of 50,000 people.

In 2022, Walters released his second album White Flag Waves.

== Personal life ==
Walters' older brother is the frontman of New Zealand band Six60, Matiu Walters.

== Discography ==
=== Studio albums ===
Title	Album details	Peak chart positions	Certifications
Title	Album details	NZ Artist	Certifications
Escape	Released: 20 November 2020; Label: Universal Music New Zealand, Ricochet Records; Format: LP, digital download, streaming	11	RMNZ: Platinum
White Flag Waves	Released: 18 March 2022; Label: Universal, Ricochet Records; Format: Digital download, streaming	18	

=== Singles ===
Title	Year	Peak chart positions		Certifications	Album
Title	Year	NZ	NZ Artist	Certifications	Album
"Moving On"	2019	— (Note: "Moving On" did not enter the New Zealand top 40 chart, but peaked at number 40 on the Hot 40 Singles Chart.)	— (Note: "Moving On" did not enter the New Zealand artists' top 20 chart, but peaked at number 4 on the Hot 20 NZ Singles Chart.)		Non-album singles
"Together"	2019	— (Note: "Together" did not enter the New Zealand top 40 chart, but peaked at number 39 on the Hot 40 Singles Chart.)	— (Note: "Together" did not enter the New Zealand artists' top 20 chart, but peaked at number 8 on the Hot 20 NZ Singles Chart.)		Non-album singles
"Wishing Well"	2019	—	— (Note: "Wishing Well" did not enter the New Zealand artists' top 20 chart, but peaked at number 11 on the Hot 20 NZ Singles Chart.)		Non-album singles
"Closely"	2019	— (Note: "Closely" did not enter the New Zealand top 40 chart, but peaked at number 29 on the Hot 40 Singles Chart.)	— (Note: "Closely" did not enter the New Zealand artists' top 20 chart, but peaked at number 6 on the Hot 20 NZ Singles Chart.)		Non-album singles
"Escape"	2020	— (Note: "Escape" did not enter the New Zealand top 40 chart, but peaked at number 40 on the Hot 40 Singles Chart.)	— (Note: "Escape" did not enter the New Zealand artists' top 20 chart, but peaked at number 4 on the Hot 20 NZ Singles Chart.)		Escape
"Not My Neighbour" (solo or featuring Kiana Ledé)	2020	4	2	RMNZ: 2× Platinum	Escape
"Close My Eyes"	2020	—	— (Note: "Close My Eyes" did not enter the New Zealand artists' top 20 chart, but peaked at number 12 on the Hot 20 NZ Singles Chart.)		Escape
"Vicious Love"	2021	— (Note: "Vicious Love" did not enter the New Zealand top 40 chart, but peaked at number 5 on the Hot 40 Singles Chart.)	18		White Flag Waves
"Soul Food"	2021	— (Note: "Soul Food" did not enter the New Zealand top 40 chart, but peaked at number 17 on the Hot 40 Singles Chart.)	— (Note: "Soul Food" did not enter the New Zealand artists' top 20 chart, but peaked at number 1 on the Hot 20 NZ Singles Chart.)		White Flag Waves
"—" denotes a recording that did not chart.

=== Promotional singles ===
Title	Year	Peak chart positions		Album
Title	Year	NZ Hot	NZ Artist Hot	Album
"Heroine"	2019	—	—	Non-album single
"Sinner"	2020	—	14	Escape
"Old with Me"	2020	—	20	Escape
"Aroha Kaitangata"	2021	—	19	Non-album single
"Your Way"	2022	—	13	White Flag Waves
"Coast Girl"	2022	—	14	White Flag Waves
"Circus"	2022	—	—	White Flag Waves
"Stay the Same"	2022	23	3	White Flag Waves
"—" denotes a recording that did not chart.
