= Toto (Drax Project song) =

2018 single by Drax Project

Single by Drax Project

from the album Noon
- Released: 13 August 2018
- Genre: Pop
- Length: 3:09
- Label: Drax Project, Universal Music New Zealand
- Songwriters: Benjamin Daniel Harold O'Leary; Matthew David Beveridge Beachen; Samuel Jacob Henry Thomson; Shaan Singh

Drax Project singles chronology
"Woke Up Late" (2017)	"Toto" (2018)	"Woke Up Late" (2019)

Music video
- "Toto" on YouTube

"Toto" is a song by New Zealand band Drax Project. Inspired by vocalist Shaan Singh quitting their full-time jobs to pursue music, "Toto" was released as the second single from the Noon EP in August 2018. The song was a commercial success, becoming platinum certified in New Zealand.

== Background and composition ==
The song was written by the band the day after the band members quit their full-time jobs to pursue music. While not directly inspired by the 1982 song "Africa" by Toto, the band references "Africa" in the song's lyrics, and wanted to recreate the same joyfulness present in "Africa". The first stanza of the song's lyrics are a direct quote by vocalist Shaan Singh, who was describing his day to a friend. The band performed the song live before deciding on a finished version of the song's lyrics. Due to a fan's strong response to the song, the band were convinced to leave the song as it was, and release the song on the Noon EP.

== Release ==
The song was first unveiled as a track on the Noon EP, which was released on 8 June 2018. A month later on 13 August, the song was announced as the band's next single. "Toto" was later featured in the band's debut album Drax Project. A music video was produced for the song, a dance rehearsal video made in collaboration with Samsung, that does not feature members of the band.

The single climbed the charts in October 2018, and was certified platinum in 2019 and double platinum in 2021.

== Credits and personnel ==
Credits adapted from Tidal.

- Devin Abrams – producer
- Matt Beachen – drums, songwriter
- Simon Gooding – engineer
- Stuart Hawkes – mastering engineer
- Ben O'Leary – bass guitar, songwriter
- Sam Thomson – bass (vocal), songwriter
- Shaan Singh – vocals, songwriting

== Charts ==
=== Weekly charts ===
Chart (2018)	Peak position
New Zealand Artist Singles (Recorded Music NZ)	3

=== Year-end charts ===
Chart (2018)	Position
New Zealand Artists (Recorded Music NZ)	13

== Certifications ==
Certifications and sales for "Toto"
Region	Certification	Certified units/sales
New Zealand (RMNZ)	2× Platinum	60,000^{‡}
^{‡} Sales+streaming figures based on certification alone.
