= Six60 (2019 album) =

Studio album by Six60
- Released: 8 November 2019
- Genre: Pop rock
- Label: Massive Entertainment
- Producer: E. Kidd Bogart; Big Taste; Justin Gray; Printz Board

Six60 chronology
Six60 (2017)	Six60 (2019)	Castle St (2022)

Singles from Six60
- 1. "The Greatest" Released: 26 July 2019; 2. "Please Don't Go" Released: 11 October 2019; 3. "Raining" Released: 11 October 2019; 4. "Never Enough" Released: 18 December 2019; 5. "Long Gone" Released: 10 March 2020; 6. "Sundown" Released: 4 August 2020

Six60 is the third self-titled full-length studio album by New Zealand rock band Six60. It was released on 8 November 2019 through New Zealand label Massive Entertainment. Production was handled mainly by Malay, together with Printz Board, Big Taste, E. Kidd Bogart and Justin Gray. It debuted atop of the Official New Zealand Music Chart on the week of 18 November 2019 and as of December 2020 has never left the top five since then. The album was certified triple platinum by Recorded Music NZ on 14 September 2020 and was New Zealand's best-selling album of 2020. The album featured six singles.

== Track listing ==
Six60 track listing
No.	Title	Writer(s)	Producer(s)	Length
1.	"Never Enough"	Matiu Walters; Marlon Gerbes; James Ryan Ho; Paul "Phamous" Shelton	Malay	2:51
2.	"Please Don't Go"	Walters; Gerbes; Ho; Evan "Kidd" Bogart; Justin Gray; John Lomax; Alan Lomax	Malay; E. Kidd Bogart; Justin Gray	2:40
3.	"Long Gone"	Walters; Gerbes; Ho; Bogart; Leroy Clampitt	Malay; Big Taste	2:58
4.	"Ghosts"	Walters; Gerbes; Ho; Bogart; Priese Prince Lamont Board	Malay; Printz Board	3:36
5.	"Breathe"	Walters; Gerbes; Ho; Shelton	Malay	3:36
6.	"Tomorrow"	Walters; Gerbes; Ho; Bogart; Board	Malay; Printz Board	3:16
7.	"The Greatest"	Walters; Gerbes; Ho; Bogart; Board	Malay	2:51
8.	"Raining"	Walters; Gerbes; Ho; Nicolay Sereba; Vincent Dery	Malay	3:02
9.	"Sundown"	Walters; Gerbes; Ho; Shelton	Malay	2:57
10.	"Bitter End"	Walters; Gerbes; Ho; Bogart	Malay	3:29

== Charts ==
=== Weekly charts ===
Weekly chart performance for Six60
Chart (2019)	Peak position
Australian Albums (ARIA)	8
New Zealand Albums (RMNZ)	1

=== Year-end charts ===
Year-end chart performance for Six60
Chart	Year	Position
New Zealand Albums (RMNZ)	2020	1
New Zealand Albums (RMNZ)	2022	8
New Zealand Albums (RMNZ)	2023	25

== Certifications ==
Certifications for Six60
Region	Certification	Certified units/sales
New Zealand (RMNZ)	7× Platinum	105,000^{‡}
^{‡} Sales+streaming figures based on certification alone.

== See also ==
- List of number-one albums from the 2020s (New Zealand)
- List of number-one albums from the 2010s (New Zealand)
