= Tukituki Te Manawa =

2020 single by Drax Project

Single by Drax Project
- Language: Māori
- Released: 25 December 2020
- Genre: Pop
- Length: 2:53
- Label: Drax Project, Universal Music New Zealand
- Songwriters: Matthew David Beveridge Beachen; Hinewehi Mohi; Benjamin Daniel Harold O'Leary; Shaan Singh; Samuel Jacob Henry Thomson; Tīmoti Kāretu
- Producer: Drax Project

Drax Project singles chronology
"Firefly" (2020)	"Tukituki Te Manawa" (2020)	"Over It" (2021)

Music video
- "Tukituki Te Manawa" at NZ On Screen

"Tukituki Te Manawa" ("Fluttering Heart") is a song by New Zealand band Drax Project, performed in Māori language. It was the band's second song released as a part of the Waiata / Anthems project, with their first being a re-release of their 2017 single "Woke Up Late" for the 2019 Waiata / Anthems compilation album. An unreleased song by the band originally written in English, "Tukituki Te Manawa" translated into Māori by Hinewehi Mohi and Sir Tīmoti Kāretu and released on Christmas Day 2020. In 2021, the song was the subject of an episode of a TVNZ OnDemand documentary series, documenting the creation of music for Waiata / Anthems.

The song debuted at number 10 on the New Zealand Hot Singles chart. By the end of 2021, it was the 17th most successful Te Reo Māori song of the year in New Zealand.

== Background and composition ==
In September 2019, Drax Project took part in Waiata / Anthems, a compilation album of contemporary New Zealand music re-interpreted in Te Reo Māori. They performed "I Moeroa", a re-recording of the band's 2017 single "Woke Up Late" translated by Sir Tīmoti Kāretu and Jeremy Tātere MacLeod. The team behind the production of "I Moeroa" contacted Drax Project after its release, to work on a second song.

"Tukituki Te Manawa" was based on a previously unreleased song by the band, called "Take My Breath Away", which was originally written several years before but otherwise unreleased by the band. Musician Jerome Kavanagh recorded taonga pūoro (traditional musical instruments) for the song, including pūtātara and kōauau.

The recording process behind "Tukituki Te Manawa" was the feature of an episode of a TVNZ OnDemand documentary series following the creation of music sung in Te Reo Māori for Waiata / Anthems, which was released on 1 May 2021.

== Credits and personnel ==
Credits adapted from Tidal and YouTube.

- Matthew David Beveridge Beachen – composer, lyricist, drums
- Chris Chetland – mastering engineer
- Leonardo Coghini – additional keyboards
- Drax Project – producer, engineer
- Simon Gooding – mixing
- Jerome Kavanagh – taonga pūoro
- Hinewehi Mohi – composer, lyricist, translation and interpretation
- Benjamin Daniel Harold O'Leary – composer, lyricist, guitar
- Shaan Singh – composer, lyricist, vocalist
- Samuel Jacob Henry Thomson – composer, lyricist, bass
- Sir Tīmoti Kāretu – composer, lyricist, translation and interpretation

== Charts ==
Chart (2021)	Peak position
New Zealand Hot Singles (Recorded Music NZ)	10
New Zealand Artist Hot Singles (Recorded Music NZ)	1
New Zealand Te Reo Māori Singles (Recorded Music NZ)	3

=== Year-end charts ===
Chart (2021)	Position
New Zealand Te Reo Māori (Recorded Music NZ)	17
