= Catching Feelings (Drax Project song) =

2019 single by Drax Project and Six60

- Cover of Catching Feelings featuring Phony Ppl

Single by Drax Project featuring Six60

from the album Drax Project
- Released: 4 September 2019
- Genre: Pop
- Length: 3:38
- Label: Drax Project, Universal Music New Zealand
- Songwriters: Ben O'Leary; Devin Abrams; Marlon Gerbes; Matiu Walters; Matthew Beachen; Samuel Thomson; Shaan Singh

Drax Project singles chronology
"All This Time" (2019)	"Catching Feelings" (2019)	"Relax" (2020)

Six60 singles chronology
"The Greatest" (2019)	"Catching Feelings" (2019)	"Please Don't Go" (2019)

"Catching Feelings" is a song by New Zealand band Drax Project, featuring Six60. The song was written as a collaboration between the bands in 2017, and was released as a single from Drax Project's debut album Drax Project in September 2019. A new version featuring Brooklyn group Phony Ppl was released in July 2021.

== Background and composition ==
The song was a produce of the writing sessions Drax Project and Six60 had in 2017 at Marlon Gerbes' home, after meeting at a New Zealand music festival. Six60 members Marlon Gerbes and Matiu Walters gave the band advice, that a song should work well in a stripped-down version, which they applied to "Catching Feelings", as well as their songs "Woke Up Late" (2017) and "Smart Love" (2019).

The piano outro was performed by a high school friend of Shaan Singh's, Leonardo, and the vocal chorus bridge featuring the members of Six60 was recorded in March 2017.

== Release ==
The song was released on 4 September 2019, three weeks before their debut album. In July 2021, a new version of the song was released featuring Brooklyn group Phony Ppl, which was released to radio in the United States.

== Critical reception ==
The song was nominated for the Single of the Year award at the 2020 Aotearoa Music Awards.

== Credits and personnel ==
Credits adapted from Tidal.

- Devin Abrams – songwriting
- Matt Beachen – songwriting
- Drax Project – performer
- Marlon Gerbes – songwriting
- Ben O'Leary – songwriting
- Shaan Singh – songwriting, vocals
- Six60 – performer
- Sam Thomson – songwriting
- Matiu Walters – songwriting

== Charts ==
=== Weekly charts ===
Chart (2019)	Peak position
Australia (ARIA)	43
New Zealand (Recorded Music NZ)	3

=== Year-end charts ===
Chart (2019)	Position
New Zealand (Recorded Music NZ)	41
Chart (2020)	Position
New Zealand (Recorded Music NZ)	10
Chart (2021)	Position
New Zealand (Recorded Music NZ)	27

== Certifications ==
Certifications and sales for "Catching Feelings"
Region	Certification	Certified units/sales
Australia (ARIA)	3× Platinum	210,000^{‡}
New Zealand (RMNZ)	9× Platinum	270,000^{‡}
^{‡} Sales+streaming figures based on certification alone.
