= Firefly (Drax Project song) =

2020 single by Drax Project

Single by Drax Project featuring Fetty Wap and AACACIA
- Released: 23 October 2020
- Genre: Pop
- Length: 2:52
- Label: Drax Project, Universal Music New Zealand
- Songwriters: Ben O'Leary; Imad-Roy El-Amine; Matthew Beachen; Rogét Chahayed; Samuel Thomson; Shaan Singh; Willie Junior Maxwell II

Drax Project singles chronology
"Relax" (2020)	"Firefly" (2020)	"Tukituki Te Manawa" (2020)

Fetty Wap singles chronology
"Pretty Thang" (2020)	"Firefly" (2020)	"Speed" (2020)

AACACIA singles chronology
"Bend" (2020)	"Firefly" (2020)

Music video
- "Firefly" on YouTube

"Firefly" is a song by New Zealand band Drax Project, featuring American rapper Fetty Wap and New Zealand musician AACACIA. The song was a success in New Zealand, becoming platinum certified.

== Background and composition ==
The song was written in Los Angeles with Rogét Chahayed and Imad Royal in a single three-hour writing session, and was inspired by a visit to Long Island. The band added a brass section to the song, as they felt that this suited the song's party vibe.

== Release ==
The song was released as a single on 23 October 2020. A music video was released for the song, which was shot in a rural area of Wellington.

== Credits and personnel ==
Credits adapted from Tidal.

- AACACIA – featured artist
- Matt Beachen – drums, songwriter
- Dale Becker – mastering engineer
- Rogét Chahayed – producer, songwriter
- Drax Project – performer, engineer
- Imad-Roy El-Amine – producer, songwriter
- Jack Harre – trumpet
- Ben O'Leary – guitar, songwriter
- Tyler K. Scott – mixing
- Shaan Singh – songwriter, tenor saxophone
- Tyler Shields – engineer
- Sam Thomson – bass, songwriter
- Kaito Walley – trombone
- Fetty Wap – featured artist, songwriter

== Charts ==
=== Weekly charts ===
Chart (2020–21)	Peak position
New Zealand (Recorded Music NZ)	27

=== Year-end charts ===
Chart (2021)	Position
New Zealand Artists (Recorded Music NZ)	16

== Certifications ==
Certifications and sales for "Firefly"
Region	Certification	Certified units/sales
New Zealand (RMNZ)	2× Platinum	60,000^{‡}
^{‡} Sales+streaming figures based on certification alone.
