= Pere Wihongi =

- Born: 1993 or 1994 (age 32–33); Herekino, New Zealand
- Member of: Maimoa; Te Kākano

Pere Te Ruru o te Ramana Wihongi (born 1993 or 1994), sometimes known mononymously as PERE, is a New Zealand musician, voice actor, choreographer, and kapa haka performer. She is part of the award-winning music groups Maimoa and Te Kākano.

== Early life ==
Wihongi was born and raised in Herekino. The family moved to Auckland when Wihongi was 9, and she began attending the Te Kura Kaupapa Māori ā Rohe o Māngere immersion school. While there she competed in and won the Ngā Manu Kōrero speech competition. She then attended South Seas Film & Television School to pursue a career in television.

== Career ==
=== Television ===
Wihongi's first job was as a production assistant, but eventually she worked her way up to be a reporter on news and current affairs shows such as Te Karere and Marae, and presenting the children's show Pūkana. In 2019, Wihongi started doing music and voice acting for the children's cartoon Pipi Mā. In 2021, Wihongi was a judge on the talent show 5 Minutes Of Fame.

=== Music ===
In 2015, Wihongi formed the music group Pūkana and Whānau with fellow Pūkana presenters. They changed their name to Maimoa in 2017. Maimoa appeared on the reality television shows Voices of Our Future and Waiata Nation, which documented the creation of their second single "Wairua" and their debut album Rongomaiwhiti respectively. Wihongi formed another music group, Te Kākano, in 2018.

Wihongi had her solo debut in 2019 with the single "High on Ingoingo". She won Best Māori Male Solo Artist at that year's Waiata Māori Music Awards, alongside winning Best Traditional Album and Best Māori Pop Album for Te Kākano's self-titled debut album.

=== Film ===
In 2022, Wihongi joined the production company Matewa Media as the co-musical director alongside Rob Ruha for the Māori dub of the 1994 Disney film The Lion King. In addition to this role, she also provided the voice of Olaf in the dub of Frozen.

=== Kapa haka ===
Wihongi has competed in kapa haka competition Te Matatini since she was 15. She founded the kapa haka group Angitu. At Te Matatini 2023, Angitu broke gender norms by having Wihongi and Tuhoe Tamaiparea perform in the poi line.

== Personal life ==
Wihongi identifies as takatāpui and has used both masculine and feminine pronouns but states in her social media profiles that she/her are her preferred pronouns. Her iwi are Te Rarawa, Ngāti Kurī, Ngāpuhi, Ngāti Rehua and Ngāti Wai.

== Discography ==
=== Extended plays ===
Title	Album details
Pere Kirihimete	Released: 17 December 2021; Label: Self-published; Format: Digital download, streaming

=== Singles ===
Title	Year	Peak chart positions		Album
Title	Year	NZ Hot	NZ Hot Artist	Album
"High on Ingoingo"	2019	19	1	Non-album singles
"Te Haa o Aotearoa"	2019	—	—	Non-album singles
"E Raka e" (with Maimoa)	2020	—	—	Rongomaiwhiti
"Iarere Āio" (featuring Mohi)	2022	40	4	Non-album single
"—" denotes a recording that did not chart.

=== Singles as featured artist ===
Title	Year	Peak chart positions			Album
Title	Year	NZ Artist	NZ Hot	NZ Hot Artist	Album
"Te Matatini Ki Te Ao" (among National Kapa Haka Festival 2019)	2018	—	31	8	Non-album singles
"Pakipaki Mai" (Te Nūtube featuring Pere and Friends)	2019	—	24	4	Non-album singles
"Stay" (among Tūtahi)	2020	16	10	1	Non-album singles
"Minamina" (Valkyrie featuring Pere)	2020	—	—	—	Non-album singles
"—" denotes a recording that did not chart.

==== Promotional singles ====
Title	Year	Peak chart positions	Album
Title	Year	NZ Hot Artist	Album
"Mahuru"	2020	9	Non-album single
"—" denotes a recording that did not chart.

==== Other charted songs ====
Title	Year	Peak chart positions			Album
Title	Year	NZ Artist	NZ Hot	NZ Hot Artist	Album
"Tōrea" (Makaira Berry, Hamiora Tuari and Pere Wihongi)	2018	20	27	13	Te Kākano
"Kia Tika Rā" (Pere Wihongi and Makaira Berry)	2018	—	—	13	Te Kākano
"Raumati"	2019	—	—	14	Te Kākano
"—" denotes a recording that did not chart.

=== Guest appearances ===
Title	Year	Other artists	Album
"He Rā Hou Tēnai"	2017	Awatea Wihongi	Pao Pao Pao, Vol. 1
"Pao Pao Pao"	2017	Te Whānau Pao Pao Pao, Makaira Berry, Mareikura Nathan, Awatea Wihongi	Pao Pao Pao, Vol. 1
"Tū Mai"	2018	Makaira Berry, Hamiora Tuari, Mere Arihi Pipi-Takoko	Te Kākano
"Raumati"	2018	—N/a	Te Kākano
"Hikaia Te Ahikōmau"	2018	Makaira Berry	Te Kākano
"Tōrea"	2018	Makaira Berry, Hamiora Tuari	Te Kākano
"Kia Tika Rā"	2018	Makaira Berry	Te Kākano
"Te Puea"	2018	Makaira Berry, Mere Arihi Pipi-Takoko, Hamiora Tuari	Te Kākano
"Matike Maranga"	2019	Makaira Berry, Puawai Taiapa	Tākaro Tribe
"Ahakamana"	2019	Makaira Berry, Puawai Taiapa	Tākaro Tribe
