= Theia (singer) =

New Zealander singer songwriter

- Also known as: TE KAAHU
- Born: Em-Haley Kukutai Walker; Christchurch, New Zealand,
- Genres: Pop; alt-pop; indie-pop; avant-pop; cyber-pop; experimental pop; hyper pop; electronic music
- Occupations: Singer, songwriter
- Instrument: Vocals
- Years active: 2015–present
- Label: Theia • Warner
- Website: www.princesstheia.com

Em-Haley Kukutai Walker, known professionally as Theia, is an alt-pop artist from New Zealand. In 2016 she released her debut major label single, 'Roam' with her accompanying EP Theia released on 30 June 2017. The EP debuted at No. 15 in New Zealand's Official Top 40, and at No. 3 in the NZ Album Chart. Her second EP Not Your Princess was released on 12 April 2019 and in May 2020 Theia released her 99% Angel mixtape.

== Early life ==
Theia is of Ngāti Tīpā and Waikato-Tainui ancestry and was born in Christchurch.

== Awards and nominations ==
In November 2017, Theia was nominated for three awards at the Vodafone New Zealand Music Awards.

She has twice been a finalist in the International Songwriting Competition. In 2020, her song ‘Not Your Princess’ was placed third in the ‘Unpublished’ category. It also received an honorable mention in the ‘Top 40/Pop’ category. Not Your Princess also won Theia second place in Unsigned Only's Pop category.

== Discography ==
Albums

Title	Album details
Girl, In A Savage World	• Released: 7 November 2025 • Label: Self-released • Formats: Digital download streaming, Vinyl

=== Mixtapes ===
Title	Mixtape details
99% Angel	• Released: 15 May 2020 • Label: Self-released • Formats: Digital download, streaming

=== EPs ===
Title	EP details
Theia	• Released: 30 June 2017 • Label: Warner Music New Zealand • Formats: Digital Download, streaming, CD
Not Your Princess	• Released: 12 April 2019 • Label: Warner Music New Zealand • Formats: Digital download, streaming

=== Singles ===
==== As a lead artist ====
Title	Year	Album
"Silver Second"	2015	Theia
"Roam"	2016	Theia
"Champange Supernova"	2017	Theia
"Treat You"	2017	Theia
"Bye Bye"	2018	Not Your Princess
"Bad Idea"	2018	Not Your Princess
"Avant-Garde"	2018	data-sort-value="" style="background: var(--background-color-interactive, #ececec); color: var(--color-base, inherit); vertical-align: middle; text-align: center; " class="table-na" | Non-album single
"Not Your Princess"	2019	Not Your Princess
"Candy"	2019	Not Your Princess
"1Night" (with Sean Turk)	2019	Non-album single
"Te Kaiwhakaora O Te Ao"	2019	Non-album single
"Kitty Kat"	2020	99% Angel
"Frat Boyz"	2020	99% Angel
"99% Angel"	2020	99% Angel
"Celebrity"	2020	99% Angel
"Freak"	2020	Non-album single
"CREEP" feat. Vayne	2021	Non-album single
Pray 4 Me	2023	Girl, In A Savage World
Crucified By U	2023	Non-album single
Girls!	2023	Non-album single
Dollhouse	2023	Non-album single
Roam (Alternative Version)	2024	Non-album single
BALDH3AD!	2024	Girl, In A Savage World
Hoki Whenua Mai (Return The Land)	2025	Girl, In A Savage World
Patupaiarehe	2025	Girl, In A Savage World

==== As featured artist ====
Title	Year	Album
"Stay" (Tūtahi featuring Theia)	2020	Non-album singles
"Pohewatia" (Kings featuring Theia)	2021	Non-album singles
