= Kings (musician) =

New Zealand rapper (born 1991)

- Born: Kingdon Chapple-Wilson; North Shore, New Zealand
- Genre: Hip-hop
- Occupations: Rapper; record producer; singer; songwriter
- Years active: 2010–present
- Label: Arch Angel Records - Independent

Kingdon Chapple-Wilson (born 1991), known professionally as Kings, is a New Zealand rapper, record producer, singer and songwriter. He has been producing music under his self-run label Arch Angel Records since 2018, and holds the record for longest-running No. 1 single in New Zealand for his 2016 song "Don't Worry Bout' It" [sic].

== Early life ==
Kings is of Māori and Samoan ethnicity. His grandfather was artist and educator Arnold Manaaki Wilson. He has one daughter and they live in Auckland, New Zealand. He is 6 feet tall. His music studio is at Awataha Marae, which was built by his grandfather. Kings began playing the guitar at age seven and first learned the skills of his trade from completing a foundation year course at MAINZ.

== Career ==
Kings started his career providing music production services for companies around the world for use in commercials, television and film. He pursued a solo career in the mid-2010s, collaborating with New Zealand electronic producers such as Dan Aux, General Lee, and Jolyon Petch.

In 2016, Kings released his debut single "Don't Worry Bout' It". The song became the biggest New Zealand single release that year and surpassed the record for longest running No. 1 on the New Zealand Singles Chart, previously held by Lorde, spending 33 consecutive weeks at the top. The music video was filmed impromptu by Kings in Fiji and then edited on the plane ride home. "Don't Worry Bout' It" was certified double platinum and won the "Highest Selling New Zealand Single" and "Radio Airplay Record of the Year" awards at the 2017 Vodafone New Zealand Music Awards.

Kings released his self-titled debut extended play (EP) in late 2016, which also included the singles "What We Supposed To Do" and "Someday". Kings was named "Breakthrough Artist of The Year" at the 2016 Vodafone New Zealand Music Awards, as well as "Best Pacific Male Artist", "Best Urban Artist", "Best Producer" at the Vodafone Pacific Music Awards. Kings was nominated for "Best Solo Artist" for the EP, at the 2017 New Zealand Music Awards.

In late 2017, Kings independently released his debut album Chapter One. The album featured the singles "We'll Never Know", "Domino" and "In the Sun". Six months later Kings released his second album Two, in early 2018, which featured the singles "You Do" and "Temporary Me". The single "Temporary Me" saw Kings make the finalist list for the 2018 APRA Silver Scroll Award. In 2021, Kings was featured on the New Zealand version of The Masked Singer as the "Monster". He was revealed in his fifth appearance.

== Discography ==
=== Studio albums ===
Title	Details
Chapter One	Released: 2017; Label: Arch Angel; Format: Digital download
Two	Released: 2018; Label: Arch Angel; Format: Digital download
Lov3 & 3go	Released: 2018; Label: Arch Angel; Format: Digital download
Raplist	Released: 2021; Label: Arch Angel; Format: Digital download, streaming

=== Extended plays ===
Title	Details	Peak chart positions
Title	Details	NZ
Kings	Released: 2016; Label: Arch Angel Records/Warner Music NZ; Format: CD, digital download	32

=== Singles ===
==== As lead artist ====
Title	Year	Peak chart positions	Album
Title	Year	NZ	Album
"Don't Worry Bout' It"	2016	5	Kings
"Out Here Alive" (featuring Melodownz)	2018	— (Note: "Out Here Alive" did not enter the NZ Top 40 Singles Chart, but peaked at number 37 on the NZ Hot Singles Chart.)	Two
"6 Figures"	2018	24	Lov3 & 3go
"D'ussé"	2019	— (Note: "D'ussé" did not enter the NZ Top 40 Singles Chart, but peaked at number 37 on the NZ Hot Singles Chart.)	Lov3 & 3go
"Flex"	2019	— (Note: "Flex" did not enter the NZ Top 40 Singles Chart, but peaked at number 16 on the NZ Hot Singles Chart.)	Non-album singles
"Hit That (Or Nah)"	2019	— (Note: "Hit That (Or Nah)" did not enter the NZ Top 40 Singles Chart, but peaked at number 19 on the NZ Hot Singles Chart.)	Non-album singles
"R.I.P."	2019	— (Note: "R.I.P." did not enter the NZ Top 40 Singles Chart, but peaked at number 36 on the NZ Hot Singles Chart.)	Non-album singles
"Help Me Out" (featuring Sons of Zion)	2020	17	Raplist
"Teach Me How to Love"	2021	— (Note: "Teach Me How to Love" did not enter the NZ Top 40 Singles Chart, but peaked at number 26 on the NZ Hot Singles Chart.)	Raplist
"One Man Up"	2021	— (Note: "One Man Up" did not enter the NZ Top 40 Singles Chart, but peaked at number 28 on the NZ Hot Singles Chart.)	Raplist
"Pohewatia" (featuring Theia)	2021	— (Note: "Pohewatia" did not enter the NZ Top 40 Singles Chart, but peaked at number 18 on the NZ Hot Singles Chart.)	Non-album singles
"Loved Up" (featuring Haan808)	2021	—	Non-album singles
"Young 4eva"	2021	— (Note: "Young 4eva" did not enter the NZ Top 40 Singles Chart, but peaked at number 24 on the NZ Hot Singles Chart.)	Non-album singles
"Light Up the Dark"	2022	—	Non-album singles
"LDN TYO"	2022	—	Non-album singles
"Action Man"	2022	—	Non-album singles
"Dad's Son"	2023	—	Non-album singles
"Man of the House"	2023	—	Non-album singles
"Believe"	2023	—	Non-album singles
"Rose"	2023	—	Non-album singles

==== As featured artist ====
Title	Year	Peak chart positions		Album
Title	Year	NZ Hot	NZ Artist	Album
"Real Ones" (L.A.B. with Kings)	2022	11	19	L.A.B. V
"Feelings" (Stan Walker featuring Kings)	2022	12	18	All In

=== Guest appearances ===
Title	Year	Other artists	Album
"Kei Aro Atu Koe / Don’t Worry Bout' It"	2019	—N/a	Waiata / Anthems
"Mocking Bird"	2022	Stan Walker	All In
