= Voices of Our Future =

- Also known as: 1. VOOF
- Genre: Reality Television
- Directed by: Barbara Carpenter
- Starring: Puawai Taipa; Hoeta Maxwell-Blake; Mereana Teka; Raniera Blake; Nathaniel Howe; Te Awahina Kaiwai-Winikau; Tawaroa Kawana; Kaaterama Pou; Metoagivale Schmidt-Peke; Awatea Wihongi; Pere Wihongi
- Country of origin: New Zealand
- Original language: English
- No. of seasons: 1
- No. of episodes: 9

Production
- Executive producer: Nicole Hoey
- Editor: Keith Hill Thomas Gleeson
- Camera setup: Multi-camera
- Running time: 30 minutes
- Production company: Cinco Cine Film Productions Ltd

Original release
- Network: Māori Television
- Release: 19 July – 13 September 2017

Voices of Our Future is a New Zealand reality television show that airs on Māori Television. It premiered on 19 July 2017. The show documents the lives of 12 talented singers who made a hit song for Maori language week in 2016.

== Production ==
The show was announced in July 2017.

The show premiered on 19 July 2017.
