= Help Me Out (Kings song) =

2020 single by Kings

Single by Kings featuring Sons of Zion

from the album Raplist
- Released: 16 October 2020
- Genre: Pop, hip-hop
- Length: 2:15
- Label: Arch Angel Records
- Songwriters: Kingdon Chapple-Wilson; Matt Sadgrove; Joel Latimer; Sam Eriwata
- Producer: Sons of Zion

Kings singles chronology
"R.I.P." (2019)	"Help Me Out" (2020)	"Teach Me How to Love" (2021)

Sons of Zion singles chronology
"Break Up Song" (2020)	"Help Me Out" (2020)	"Crazy" (2020)

Music video
- "Help Me Out" on YouTube

"Help Me Out" is a song by New Zealand musicians Kings and Sons of Zion, which was released as a single in October 2020. The song was a commercial success in New Zealand, receiving a platinum certification and was one of the top New Zealand top 50 singles of 2021.

== Background and composition ==
The song was written together by Kings, Joel Latimer, and Sam Eriwata of Sons of Zion, and New Zealand producer Matt Sadgrove.

== Release and promotion ==
"Help Me Out" was first released as a single on 16 October 2020, becoming a hit on New Zealand radio and streaming services in 2021. Kings promoted the song with self-directed music video in October 2020, featuring dancers Riley Bourne and Hana Morris. "Help Me Out" was added to Kings' album Raplist in mid-2021 as a bonus track.

The song was a commercial success, becoming the 9th best performing song by a New Zealand artist in the country in 2021, and the 34th best performing song overall. At the 2022 Pacific Music Awards, "Help Me Out" won the NZ On Air Radio Airplay Award and NZ On Air Streaming Award.

== Credits and personnel ==
Credits adapted from Tidal and news sources.

- Sam Eriwata – writer
- Kingdon Chapple-Wilson – writer
- Kings – artist
- Joel Latimer – writer
- Matt Sadgrove – writer, composer
- Sons of Zion – featured artist, producer

== Charts ==
=== Weekly charts ===
Chart (2020–2021)	Peak position
New Zealand Singles (Recorded Music NZ)	17

=== Year-end charts ===
Chart (2021)	Position
New Zealand (Recorded Music NZ)	34

== Certifications ==
Certifications and sales for "Help Me Out"
Region	Certification	Certified units/sales
New Zealand (RMNZ)	Platinum	30,000^{‡}
^{‡} Sales+streaming figures based on certification alone.
