= Please Don't Go (Six60 song) =

2019 single by Six60

Single by Six60

from the album Six60
- Released: 11 October 2019
- Genre: Pop
- Length: 2:40
- Label: Epic, Massive
- Songwriters: Alan Lomax; Evan Bogart; Justin Gray; Malay; Marlon Gerbes; Matiu Walters
- Producers: Evan Bogart; Justin Gray; Malay

Six60 singles chronology
"Catching Feelings" (2019)	"Please Don't Go" (2019)	"Raining" (2019)

Music video
- "Please Don't Go" on YouTube

"Please Don't Go" is a song by New Zealand band Six60, released as the second single from their third album Six60 in October 2019, on the same day as their song "Raining".

== Background and composition ==
The song is a mixed genre song, incorporating elements of rock, alternative, pop, and funk, that incorporates falsetto. The band were inspired to create a song that expressed who they were, while incorporated all aspects of their musical sound in a single track.

== Release and promotion ==
The song was released as a single on 11 October 2019, coinciding with the release of "Raining" and the announcement that Six60 had been signed by United States label Epic Records. The song's music video was shot in Tokyo when the band visited the country for a showcase in October, which was released on 16 November.

== Critical reception ==
The song was nominated for the Aotearoa Music Award for Single of the Year at the 2020 Aotearoa Music Awards, losing to "Supalonely" by Benee.

== Credits and personnel ==
Credits adapted from Tidal.

- Evan Bogart – producer, songwriter
- Ji Fraser – guitar
- Marlon Gerbes – guitar, keyboards, songwriter
- Justin Gray – producer, songwriter
- Dave Kutch – mastering engineer
- Alan Lomax – songwriter
- Chris Mac – bass guitar
- Malay – producer, songwriter
- Manny Marroquin – mixer
- Eli Paewai – drums
- Eugene Roberts – keyboards
- Matiu Walters – vocals, songwriter

== Charts ==
=== Weekly charts ===
Chart (2019)	Peak position
New Zealand (Recorded Music NZ)	2

=== Year-end charts ===
Chart (2020)	Position
New Zealand (Recorded Music NZ)	32

== Certifications ==
Certifications for "Please Don't Go"
Region	Certification	Certified units/sales
New Zealand (RMNZ)	5× Platinum	150,000^{‡}
^{‡} Sales+streaming figures based on certification alone.
