= Noon (EP) =

2018 extended play by Drax Project

EP by Drax Project
- Released: 8 June 2018
- Genre: Pop
- Length: 13:40
- Labels: Drax Project, Universal
- Producers: Devin Abrams; Kyle Kelso

Drax Project chronology
Covers (Live) (2017)	Noon (2018)	Noon (Acoustic) (2019)

Singles from Noon
- 1. "Woke Up Late" Released: 2 November 2017; 2. "Toto" Released: 13 August 2018

Noon is an extended play by New Zealand band Drax Project, released in June 2018. The EP was released after their single "Woke Up Late" (2017) became a hit in New Zealand, and during the band's tour of Europe with Camila Cabello, on her Never Be the Same Tour.

== Production ==
Noon is a collection of songs from the band's back-catalogue. Originally the band planned to release a studio album, but due to the success of the song "Woke Up Late", Drax Project quickly recorded and compiled Noon. The band decided to release Noon only a few weeks before leaving for Europe, to perform as an opening act on Camila Cabello's Never Be the Same Tour.

The songs on the extended play were written around a common theme of new beginnings. The EP's title came from a lyric in the lead single "Woke Up Late" ("awake 'til dawn, slept 'til noon").

== Release and promotion ==
"Woke Up Late" was the first song released from the EP, in November 2017, which became a hit in New Zealand in March 2018. "Toto" was released as the EP's second single in August 2018.

The band released Noon while touring Europe with Camila Cabello, on her Never Be the Same Tour.

== Critical reception ==
At the 2018 New Zealand Music Awards, Drax Project were nominated for the Aotearoa Music Award for Best Group due to the release of Noon. Drax project won single of the year at the 2018 Vodafone New Zealand Music Awards for "woke up late", the first single in the EP.

== Track listing ==
Noon track listing
No.	Title	Writer(s)	Length
1.	"Woke Up Late"	Ben O'Leary; Devin Abrams; Matt Beachen; Sam Thomson; Shaan Singh	3:01
2.	"Prefer"	O'Leary; Abrams; Beachen; Thomson; Singh	2:53
3.	"Only Us"	O'Leary; Abrams; Beachen; Thomson; Singh	2:38
4.	"Toto"	O'Leary; Abrams; Beachen; Thomson; Singh	3:09
5.	"Sidebit"	O'Leary; Abrams; Marlon Gerbes; Matiu Walters; Beachen; Thomson; Singh	2:59
Total length:			13:40

== Credits and personnel ==
Credits adapted from Tidal.

- Devin Abrams – producer (1–2, 4–5), songwriter (1–5)
- Matt Beachen – drums, songwriter
- Marlon Gerbes – songwriter (5)
- Simon Gooding – engineer
- Stuart Hawkes – mastering engineer
- Kyle Kelso – producer (3)
- Ben O'Leary – bass guitar, songwriter
- Sam Thomson – bass (vocal), songwriter
- Shaan Singh – vocals, songwriting
- Matiu Walters – songwriting (5)

== Charts ==
=== Weekly charts ===
Weekly chart performance for Noon
Chart (2018)	Peak position
New Zealand Albums (RMNZ)	10

=== Year-end charts ===
Year-end chart performance for Noon
Chart (2018)	Position
New Zealand Artist Albums (RMNZ)	11
Chart (2019)	Position
New Zealand Artist Albums (RMNZ)	14

== Certifications ==
Certifications for Noon
Region	Certification	Certified units/sales
New Zealand (RMNZ)	Gold	7,500^{‡}
^{‡} Sales+streaming figures based on certification alone.

== Release history ==
Release dates and formats for Noon
Region	Date	Format(s)	Label(s)	Ref.
New Zealand	8 June 2018	digital download; streaming	Drax Project, Universal	
