= Raining (song) =

2019 single by Six60

Single by Six60

from the album Six60
- Released: 11 October 2019
- Genre: Pop, Reggae
- Length: 3:02
- Label: Epic, Massive
- Songwriters: Malay; Marlon Gerbes; Matiu Walters; Nicolay Sereba; Vincent Dery
- Producers: Malay; Supa Dups

Six60 singles chronology
"Please Don't Go" (2019)	"Raining" (2019)	"Never Enough" (2019)

"Raining", also known by the title "It's Been Raining", is a song by New Zealand band Six60, released as the third single from their third album Six60 in October 2019, on the same day as their song "Please Don't Go".

== Background and composition ==
Six60 wrote the song in Los Angeles in collaboration with Nico & Vinz, due to their shared love of reggae. The song has a minimal production, incorporating vocal harmonies with a reggae sound and a gospel choir. The band members felt vulnerable releasing the song, as the band had been attempting to distance themselves from reggae and dub-inspired music for their most recent albums. Lyrically, "Raining" expresses the feeling of falling in love.

== Release and promotion ==
The song was released as a single on 11 October 2019, coinciding with the release of "Please Don't Go" and the announcement that Six60 had been signed by United States label Epic Records. Later that month, the band collaborated with All Black Sevu Reece to perform a live version of the song for a promotional video for the All Blacks, during the 2019 Rugby World Cup held in Japan.

In 2021, the band Coterie performed a cover of the song, which led to Six60 reaching out to them to collaborate.

== Credits and personnel ==
Credits adapted from Tidal.

- Ron Blake – flugelhorn, trumpet
- Matt Chamberlain – drums
- Vincent Dery – background vocalist, songwriter
- Ji Fraser – guitar
- Marlon Gerbes – guitar, keyboards songwriter
- Dave Kutch – mastering engineer
- Tom Luer – saxophone
- Chris Mac – bass guitar
- Malay – producer, engineer, songwriter
- Manny Marroquin – mixer
- Eli Paewai – drums
- Nicolay Sereba – background vocalist, guitar, songwriter
- Supa Dups – co-producer
- Francisco Torres – trombone
- Matiu Walters – vocals, songwriter

== Charts ==
=== Weekly charts ===
Chart (2019)	Peak position
New Zealand (Recorded Music NZ)	8

=== Year-end charts ===
Chart (2020)	Position
New Zealand (Recorded Music NZ)	32

== Certifications ==
Certifications for "Raining"
Region	Certification	Certified units/sales
New Zealand (RMNZ)	5× Platinum	150,000^{‡}
^{‡} Sales+streaming figures based on certification alone.
