= Sundown (Six60 song) =

2020 single by Six60

Single by Six60

from the album Six60
- Released: 4 August 2020
- Genre: Pop
- Length: 2:57
- Label: Epic, Massive
- Songwriters: Malay; Marlon Gerbes; Matiu Walters; Paul Phamous
- Producer: Malay

Six60 singles chronology
"Long Gone" (2020)	"Sundown" (2020)	"Fade Away" (2020)

Music video
- "Sundown" on YouTube

"Sundown" is a song by New Zealand band Six60, released as the final single from their third album Six60 in August 2020.

== Background and composition ==
The song's instruments are primarily samples of taonga pūoro (traditional Māori instruments). The samples were taken from an album by Hinewehi Mohi, which the song's producer Malay used as a basis for the track. Six60's lead singer Matiu Walters felt the song was one of his favourite tracks from the band's third album, describing it as "sound[ing] exactly like where we are right now."

== Release and promotion ==
The song was released as a single in the lead-up to their documentary film Six60: Till the Lights Go Out (2020). A music video was produced for the song, and released on 30 October. The video was directed by Connor Pritchard, who was given full creative control by the band, and shot over three days. At the 2021 Vision Feast Awards, the video won the Best Music Video award, and Pritchard was awarded the Visionary Director and Visionary Editing awards due to his work on the clip.

During the band's 2021 tour, musician and choreographer Pere Wihongi was employed to create a kapa haka routine for "Sundown", which was performed by a different regional kapa haka group at each concert.

== Critical reception ==
Alex Behan of Stuff described the song as "dreamy and aspirational".

== Credits and personnel ==
Credits adapted from Tidal.

- Matt Chamberlain – drums
- Ji Fraser – guitar
- Chris Galland – mixing engineer
- Marlon Gerbes – guitar, keyboards, songwriting
- Chris Mac – bass guitar
- Malay – engineer, production, songwriting
- Manny Marroquin – mixer
- Eli Paewai – drums
- Paul Phamous – songwriting
- Six60 – performer
- Matiu Walters – songwriting, vocals

== Charts ==
=== Weekly charts ===
Chart (2020–2021)	Peak position
New Zealand (Recorded Music NZ)	6

=== Year-end charts ===
Chart (2021)	Position
New Zealand (Recorded Music NZ)	21

== Certifications ==
Certifications for "Sundown"
Region	Certification	Certified units/sales
New Zealand (RMNZ)	6× Platinum	180,000^{‡}
^{‡} Sales+streaming figures based on certification alone.
