= Not My Neighbour =

2020 single by Niko Walters

Single by Niko Walters

from the album Escape
- Released: 21 August 2020
- Genre: contemporary R&B
- Length: 3:53
- Label: Universal Music New Zealand
- Songwriters: Brandford Fisher; Conrad Fisher; Joshua Fisher; Matiu Walters; Tyler Fisher
- Producers: Coterie; Marlon Gerbes

Niko Walters singles chronology
"Escape" (2020)	"Not My Neighbour" (2020)	"Close My Eyes" (2020)

Kiana Ledé singles chronology
"Only Fan" (2020)	"Not My Neighbour" (2021)	"Ur Best Friend" (2021)

Music video
- "Not My Neighbour" on YouTube

"Not My Neighbour" is a song by New Zealand musician Niko Walters, released as a single in August 2020. The song was a success in New Zealand, reaching number four and becoming the 17th most successful song in New Zealand in 2021. In 2021, a new version was recorded featuring American R&B singer Kiana Ledé.

== Background and writing ==
During the writing sessions for Walters' debut album Escape, he wanted to create an experimental song, different from his typical soul-inspired songs. Walters was inspired by the written works of Leonard Cohen and films by Quentin Tarantino to create a song that told a story using detailed visual imagery, as a way to "put a different spin on a classic love song". Walters worked with producer and musician Rory Noble and singer-songwriter Mikey Dam to produce the song.

== Composition ==
"Not My Neighbour" is a contemporary R&B song, that describes a love story using the metaphor of a police hunt.

== Release ==
"Not My Neighbour" was released as the second single from Escape on 21 August 2020. After the success of the song, American R&B singer Kiana Ledé collaborated with Walters to produce a new version of the song. Walters felt that "Not My Neighbour" was "an unusual song that doesn't really fit the style of everyone's vocal and feel", but Ledé's style was a good fit after she called him and discussed her ideas for the new version of the song. The new version was released on 16 April 2021.

== Credits and personnel ==
Credits adapted from Tidal.

- Chris Chetland – mastering engineer
- Mikey Dam – writer
- Ryan Hobbs – writer
- Rory Noble – producer, mixer, writer
- Niko Walters – writer

== Charts ==
=== Weekly charts ===
Chart (2020–21)	Peak position
New Zealand (Recorded Music NZ)	4

=== Year-end charts ===
Chart (2021)	Position
New Zealand (Recorded Music NZ)	17

== Certifications ==
Region	Certification	Certified units/sales
New Zealand (RMNZ)	4× Platinum	120,000^{‡}
^{‡} Sales+streaming figures based on certification alone.
