= Never Enough (Six60 song) =

2019 single by Six60

Single by Six60

from the album Six60
- Released: 18 December 2019
- Genre: Pop
- Length: 2:51
- Label: Epic, Massive
- Songwriters: Malay; Marlon Gerbes; Matiu Walters; Paul Phamous
- Producer: Malay

Six60 singles chronology
"Raining" (2019)	"Never Enough" (2019)	"Long Gone" (2020)

"Never Enough" is a song by New Zealand band Six60, released as the fourth single from their third album Six60 in December 2019.

== Background and composition ==
"Never Enough" was one of the songs written for the 2019 Six60 album sessions that attempted to take Six60's sound and transcend barriers in music between people. Guitarist Ji Fraser felt that the song was "a really beautiful-sounding forward step for us".

== Release and promotion ==
The song was released as a single in December 2019 before the start of their 2020 Six60 Saturdays tour. A music video for the song was released in early January 2020.

== Critical reception ==
Layla Bohm of Riff Magazine praised the song's "catchy pop feel", the "universal appeal of this single's lyrical content", and Walters' falsetto vocals. Iz Indelicato of Echo likened the song to the works of American band Portugal. The Man, feeling that the song was "catchy, complex, and fun", but was unimpressed with the music video for the track.

== Credits and personnel ==
Credits adapted from Tidal.

- Ron Blake – flugelhorn, trumpet
- Matt Chamberlain – drums
- Ji Fraser – guitar
- Marlon Gerbes – guitar, keyboards, songwriting
- Tom Luer – saxophone
- Chris Mac – bass guitar
- Malay – production, engineerm songwriting
- Manny Marroquin – mixer
- Eli Paewai – drums
- Paul Phamous – songwriting
- Francisco Torres – trombone
- Matiu Walters – songwriting, vocals

== Charts ==
=== Weekly charts ===
Chart (2019)	Peak position
New Zealand (Recorded Music NZ)	10

=== Year-end charts ===
Year-end chart performance for "Never Enough"
Chart (2020)	Position
New Zealand Artist Singles (RMNZ)	20

== Certifications ==
Certifications for "Never Enough"
Region	Certification	Certified units/sales
New Zealand (RMNZ)	3× Platinum	90,000^{‡}
^{‡} Sales+streaming figures based on certification alone.
