= Drift Away (Sons of Zion song) =

2018 single by Sons of Zion

Single by Sons of Zion

from the album Vantage Point
- Released: 16 March 2018
- Genre: Pop
- Length: 3:00
- Label: Sons of Zion, Sony Music Entertainment New Zealand
- Songwriter: Matthew Sadgrove

Sons of Zion singles chronology
"Is That Enough" (2017)	"Drift Away" (2018)	"So Bright" (2018)

Music video
- "Drift Away" on YouTube

"Drift Away" is a song by New Zealand band Sons of Zion, released as a single in March 2018. The song was a hit in New Zealand, becoming double platinum certified and was nominated for the Single of the Year at the New Zealand Music Awards. In 2019, the band re-recorded the song in Māori as "Pōtere Ana / Drift Away", which was included on the compilation album Waiata / Anthems.

== Background and composition ==
Sons of Zion's bassist Matt Sadgrove created the song's initial demo in 30 minutes, recording it as a voice memo. The song was inspired by the imagery of film Inception (2010), specifically the scene where Dom Cobb, played by Leonardo DiCaprio, mourns the death of his wife on a beach. Sadgrove wrote the song as a simple, sad song, noting that it had a vibe of a Tracy Chapman song, but the song developed an upbeat vibe. Sadgrove wrote the song to cater to band vocalist Caleb Haapu's voice. Lyrically, the song reminisces the loss of a summer romance.

The band were nervous to send an acoustic song to commercial pop radio. The song was stylistically different to their previous singles, and the band began to feel more fearless and able to release genreless music.

== Release and promotion ==
"Drift Away" was released as a single on 16 March 2018. A music video was released for the song in April, which featured a couple enjoying the end of summer at the beach. The song was a commercial success, becoming the number one most performed song on New Zealand radio for 11 weeks, and becoming double platinum certified.

On the band's album Vantage Point released two months later, Sons of Zion included both the original and a pop remix version of the song, and in the same year released a remix version by Otosan. In 2019, the band re-recorded the song in Māori language as "Pōtere Ana / Drift Away", with the help of Tīmoti Kāretu, who translated the song's lyrics. This version of the song was released on Waiata / Anthems, a compilation album. Vocalist Caleb Haapu found recording the song a difficult process, as he does not speak Māori.

"Drift Away" featured as the first track on the band's 2022 compilation album First XV.

== Critical reception ==
Anzel Singh of NZ Musician described "Drift Away" as the "most stripped song on [Vantage Point], feeling that the Māori strum guitar and backing vocals created "flashback[s] to moments of sweet escapes". The song was nominated for Single of the Year at the 2018 New Zealand Music Awards, losing to "Woke Up Late" by Drax Project.

== Credits and personnel ==
Credits adapted from Tidal.

- Matthew Sadgrove – engineer, mixing engineer, producer, songwriter
- Sons of Zion – performer

== Charts ==
=== Weekly charts ===
Chart (2018)	Peak position
New Zealand (Recorded Music NZ)	17

=== Year-end charts ===
Year-end chart performance for "Drift Away"
Chart (2018)	Position
New Zealand (Recorded Music NZ)	50

== Certifications ==
Certifications for "Drift Away"
Region	Certification	Certified units/sales
New Zealand (RMNZ)	5× Platinum	150,000^{‡}
^{‡} Sales+streaming figures based on certification alone.
