= Maimoa =

New Zealand Māori musical group

- Origin: Auckland, New Zealand
- Genres: Pop; Māori music
- Years active: 2015–present
- Label: Maimoa Music
- Members: Makaira Berry; Hoeata "Hops" Maxwell-Blake; Raniera Blake; Nathaniel "Nat Atk" Howe; Te Awhina Kaiwai-Wanikau; Tawaroa Kawana; Metotagivale Schmidt-Peke; Kia Kaaterama Kiri-Pou; Puawai Taiapa; Mereana "Rems" Teka; Awatea Wihongi; Pere Wihongi
- Website: www.maimoamusic.co.nz

Maimoa is a New Zealand musical group. Formed from current and former presenters from the Māori Television show Pūkana, the group debuted in 2016 with the single "Maimoatia", which was released to celebrate Te Wiki o te Reo Māori. Since their debut, the group has continued to release pop singles sung in te reo Māori, including "Wairua" (2017), a viral hit produced by members of the New Zealand band Sons of Zion.

In addition to Pūkana, the group have featured on the reality shows Voices of Our Future (2017) and season one of Waiata Nation (2020). Their appearances on Waiata Nation documented the creation of the group's debut album, Rongomaiwhiti.

== Background ==
The group first formed in 2015, as a project by Cinco Cine Film Productions to celebrate Te Wiki o te Reo Māori 2016 by releasing the single "Maimoatia". Members of the group included current and former presenters from the Māori Television show Pūkana, although some members were well known outside of the show, such as Tawaroa Kawana who performed on series 2 of New Zealand's Got Talent. "Maimoatia" was a success, topping the iTunes downloads chart in New Zealand, reaching number 4 on the Official New Zealand Music Chart's sub-chart for New Zealand musicians.

From 2017 the group began to use the name Maimoa, Their follow-up single "Wairua", produced by members of the band Sons of Zion, outperformed "Maimoatia", reaching number 2 on the New Zealand musicians sub-chart, and becoming the 15th best performing New Zealand artist song of 2017. The group formed the cast of Voices of Our Future, a 2017 Māori Television documentary/reality television show, and released a primarily English language song "We Are Human" to highlight depression. The group helped to create Dave Dobbyn's "Nau Mai Rā", a re-recorded version of the song "Welcome Home" in te reo Māori.

In 2020, Maimoa was featured on the television series Waiata Nation which was a series created by Executive Producer Nathaniel Howe, it documented each member recording a song and releasing a music video, which were featured on their debut album Rongomaiwhiti, released soon after the series finished.

=== Solo projects ===
Several members of Maimoa contributed to Pao Pao Pao, a 2017 project mentored by Rob Ruha, including Metotagivale Schmidt-Peke, Makaira Berry, Awatea Wihongi and Pere Wihongi.

In November 2018, Kia Kaaterama Kiri-Pou released her debut extended play Shine Your Light. As a part of the gospel supergroup Mōhau, Kaaterama collaborated with Te Tairāwhiti / Gisborne choir Ka Hao on the song "Paiheretia". The Mōhau album won the Te Māngai Pāho Mana Reo Award and the Best Worship Artist Te Kaipuoro Kairangi Toa award at the 2020 Aotearoa Music Awards.

Outside of Maimoa, Pere Wihongi and Makaira Berry are members of Te Kākano, a soul, pop and R&B unit, who released their debut self-titled album in 2018. The group was a critical success, winning Best Traditional Album, Best Pop Artists and Best Song at the 2019 Waiata Māori Music Awards. Pere Wihongi also debuted as a soloist in 2019 with the single "High on Ingoingo", which led to Wihongi winning Best Male Solo Artist at the 2019 Waiata Māori Music Awards.

== Discography ==
=== Studio albums ===
Title	Album details	Peak chart positions
Title	Album details	NZ Artist
Rongomaiwhiti	Released: 11 June 2020; Label: Maimoa Music; Format: Digital download, streaming	19

=== Singles ===
Title	Year	Peak chart positions		Album
Title	Year	NZ Hot	NZ Artist	Album
"Maimoatia" (as Pūkana and Whānau)	2016	×	4	Non-album singles
"Wairua"	2017	×	2	Non-album singles
"We Are Human"	2017	×	13	Non-album singles
"Kawea"	2018	30	— (Note: "Kawea" did not enter the New Zealand artists' top 20 chart, but peaked at number 4 on the Hot 20 NZ Singles Chart.)	Non-album singles
"Hurō" (featuring Lion Rezz)	2018	14	— (Note: "Hurō" did not enter the New Zealand artists' top 20 chart, but peaked at number 2 on the Hot 20 NZ Singles Chart.)	Non-album singles
"Whāia"	2020	—	— (Note: "Whāia" did not enter the New Zealand artists' top 20 chart, but peaked at number 11 on the Hot 20 NZ Singles Chart.)	Rongomaiwhiti
"Utua"	2021	21	— (Note: "Utua" did not enter the New Zealand artists' top 20 chart, but peaked at number 6 on the Hot 20 NZ Singles Chart.)	Non-album single
"—" denotes a recording that did not chart. "×" denotes periods where charts did not exist.

=== Guest appearances ===
Title	Year	Other artists	Album
"Waiora"	2022	Te Matatini, Hātea Kapa Haka	Non-album song

== Awards and nominations ==
Award	Year (Note: Indicates the year of ceremony. Each year is linked to the article about the awards held that year, wherever possible.)	Recipient(s) and nominee(s)	Category	Result	Ref.
Aotearoa Music Awards	2020	Maimoa	Best Māori Artist / Te Māngai Pāho Te Kaipuoro Māori Toa	Won	
Aotearoa Music Awards	2020	Maimoa	Te Māngai Pāho Mana Reo Award	Nominated	
APRA Awards	2020	"Whāia"	APRA Maioha Award	Nominated	
Waiata Māori Music Awards	2018	"Wairua"	Radio Airplay Song of the Year by a Māori Artist in Te Reo Māori Award	Won	
Waiata Māori Music Awards	2019	"Kawea"	Radio Airplay Song of the Year by a Māori Artist in Te Reo Māori Award	Won	
