= Sons of Zion =

New Zealand reggae band

- Origin: Pakuranga, Auckland, New Zealand
- Genres: Pacific reggae; roots reggae; hip hop; pop
- Years active: 2007–present
- Label: Sony Music New Zealand
- Members: Samuel Eriwata; Rio Panapa; Joel Latimer; Matt Sadgrove; Ross Nansen; Caleb Haapu
- Past members: Dylan Stewart; Tawhiri Littlejohn; Harlem McKenzie; Phil Peters; Curtis Wiringi; Marika Hodgson; Zane Graham; Les Watene; Thabani Gapara; Christian Mausia

Sons of Zion is a six-member New Zealand reggae band who formed in 2007 in Pakuranga, Auckland. They became widely famous in New Zealand in early 2018, due to the popularity of their single "Drift Away".

== Biography ==
Band members Sam Eriwata and Joel Latimer grew up together in Auckland. They formed a youth band together when they attended Edgewater College in Pakuranga. The trio met Rio Panapa, originally from Rotorua, through joint church services where bands from different chapters of their church performed. Eventually Panapa moved to Auckland and joined Samuel Eriwata's youth band.

The original line-up featured Rio Panapa as lead vocalist and guitarist, Samuel Eriwata on drums, Joel Latimer on keyboards and Dylan Stewart, a bassist who moved from Whangārei to Auckland to join the band. The band won a competition to be the opening act at the Soundsplash Festival 2007 in Raglan, and hurriedly recorded an extended play so that they could release it at the festival. Panapa had difficulties with the range of some of the songs during these sessions, so Eriwata also became a vocalist for the band. The band later added Tawhiri Littlejohn as a permanent drummer as Eriwata took over more of the vocal duties, and Harlem McKenzie as a lead guitarist.

In October 2009, the band released their self-titled debut album, and spent the next few years extensively touring New Zealand and Australia. The band's singles "Good Love" (2012) and "Tell Her" (2013) received major radio airplay in New Zealand, becoming their first songs to chart in New Zealand. Their second album Universal Love was a major hit, reaching number three in New Zealand. At the 2014 Waiata Māori Music Awards, the video for the band's collaboration with Tomorrow People won the best video award. Later that year, the band covered "Sensitive to a Smile" alongside other local reggae musicians such as Katchafire and Tomorrow People as a charity single to combat child abuse.

The band's 2015 single "Stuck on Stupid" became popular internationally online, especially in locations such as Hawaii where it was a local radio hit. By 2015, the band's line-up had solidified as Eriwata, Panapa, Latimer, bassist Matt Sadgrove, Caleb Haapu of the band L40, and Ross Nansen of the Levites. In the next few years, the band's popularity online was cemented by the includion of their songs such as "I'm Ready", "Fill Me Up" and "Now" featuring on major Australasian reggae Spotify playlists. In 2017, the band produced the Te Reo song "Wairua" by Maimoa, which became a viral hit.

By 2017, the band began to experiment with genres outside of reggae, such as their collaboration "Is That Enough" with Aaradhna. For the band's third album Vantage Point (2018), all members decided to quit their day-jobs to focus entirely on the band. The first single from the album, "Drift Away", became a break-away hit for the group. The album was a success, becoming Platinum certified in New Zealand. The band toured internationally to promote the album.

In 2020, Panapa became the host of the Māori Television show Lifted.

== Artistry ==
Sons of Zion write, produce and mix all of their music. In 2017, the band created their own recording studio, No Filter Studios in Auckland.

== Personal lives ==
Samuel Eriwata's father is Richard Eriwata, a musician who became famous in the 1980s as a member of the musical theatre television show 12 Bar Rhythm 'n Shoes. Caleb Haapu's brother is singer-songwriter Seth Haapu.

Eriwata, Latimer, Stewart and Littlejohn are of Ngāpuhi descent, while Panapa's background includes Te Arawa, Ngāti Tūwharetoa and Waikato Tainui.

== Discography ==
=== Studio albums ===
Title	Album details	Peak chart positions		Certifications
Title	Album details	NZ	NZ Artist	Certifications
Sons of Zion	Released: October 2009; Label: Sony Music New Zealand; Format: CD, digital download	—	—	
Universal Love	Released: 18 October 2013; Label: Sony Music New Zealand; Format: CD, digital download, streaming	3	3	
Vantage Point	Released: 11 May 2018; Label: Sony; Format: CD, digital download, streaming	18	2	RMNZ: Platinum
"—" denotes an album that did not chart.

=== Compilation albums ===
Title	Album details	Peak chart positions		Certifications
Title	Album details	NZ	NZ Artist	Certifications
First XV	Released: 28 October 2022; Label: Sony; Format: CD, digital download, streaming	9	3	RMNZ: Gold

=== Extended plays ===
Title	EP details	Peak chart positions
Title	EP details	NZ Artist
Sons of Zion	Released: 2007; Label: Self-released; Format: CD	—
The Jukebox Suite	Released: 28 July 2017; Label: Sony; Format: Digital download, streaming	9
"—" denotes an extended play that did not chart.

=== Singles ===
==== As lead artist ====
Title	Year	Peak chart positions		Certifications	Album
Title	Year	NZ	NZ Artist	Certifications	Album
"Waiting Right Here" (featuring Hazadus)	2009	—	—		Sons of Zion
"Be With You"	2009	—	—		Sons of Zion
"Good Love"	2012	—	7	RMNZ: Platinum	Universal Love
"Tell Her"	2013	—	3	RMNZ: Platinum	Universal Love
"Superman" (featuring Tomorrow People)	2013	17	5	RMNZ: Platinum	Universal Love
"The Weekend"	2013	—	—		Universal Love
"Be My Lady"	2014	—	6	RMNZ: 3× Platinum	Universal Love
"Stuck on Stupid" (featuring Israel Starr)	2014	—	4	RMNZ: 3× Platinum	Non-album singles
"I'm Ready"	2015	—	4	RMNZ: Gold	Non-album singles
"Fill Me Up"	2015	—	9	RMNZ: 2× Platinum	Non-album singles
"Hungover"	2016	—	18		Non-album singles
"Now" (featuring Slip-On Stereo)	2016	—	3	RMNZ: Platinum	Non-album singles
"Live It Up"	2017	—	—		The Jukebox Suite
"Is That Enough" (featuring Aaradhna)	2017	—	2	RMNZ: 3× Platinum	The Jukebox Suite / Vantage Point
"Drift Away"	2018	17	1	RMNZ: 5× Platinum	Vantage Point
"So Bright"	2018	—	—		Vantage Point
"Leave with Me"	2018	—	13	RMNZ: 2× Platinum	Vantage Point
"Come Home"	2019	— (Note: "Come Home" did not enter the NZ Top 40 Singles Chart, but peaked at number 3 on the NZ Hot Singles Chart.)	3	RMNZ: Platinum	First XV
"Road Trip"	2019	— (Note: "Road Trip" did not enter the NZ Top 40 Singles Chart, but peaked at number 7 on the NZ Hot Singles Chart.)	10	RMNZ: 2× Platinum	First XV
"Break Up Song"	2020	— (Note: "Break Up Song" did not enter the NZ Top 40 Singles Chart, but peaked at number 18 on the NZ Hot Singles Chart.)	— (Note: "Break Up Song" did not enter the NZ Artists Top 20 Singles Chart, but peaked at number 2 on the NZ Artists Hot Singles Chart.)		Non-album single
"Crazy"	2020	— (Note: "Crazy" did not enter the NZ Top 40 Singles Chart, but peaked at number 2 on the NZ Hot Singles Chart.)	— (Note: "Crazy" did not enter the NZ Artists Top 20 Singles Chart, but peaked at number 1 on the NZ Artists Hot Singles Chart.)	RMNZ: Platinum	First XV
"Love on the Run" (featuring Jackson Owens)	2021	15	1	RMNZ: 3× Platinum	First XV
"Come to Bed"	2022	— (Note: "Come to Bed" did not enter the NZ Top 40 Singles Chart, but peaked at number 20 on the NZ Hot Singles Chart.)	— (Note: "Come to Bed" did not enter the NZ Artists Top 20 Singles Chart, but peaked at number 1 on the NZ Artists Hot Singles Chart.)		First XV
"One Night"	2022	— (Note: "One Night" did not enter the NZ Top 40 Singles Chart, but peaked at number 7 on the NZ Hot Singles Chart.)	10	RMNZ: Platinum	Non-album single
"Be with You" (2022 version)	2022	— (Note: "Be with You" (2022 version) did not enter the NZ Top 40 Singles Chart, but peaked at number 3 on the NZ Hot Singles Chart.)	—		Sons of Zion (reissue)
"Running" (2022 version)	2022	— (Note: "Running" (2022 version) did not enter the NZ Top 40 Singles Chart, but peaked at number 6 on the NZ Hot Singles Chart.)	—		Sons of Zion (reissue)
"Homey Girl" (2022 version)	2022	— (Note: "Homey Girl" (2022 version) did not enter the NZ Top 40 Singles Chart, but peaked at number 16 on the NZ Hot Singles Chart.)	—		Sons of Zion (reissue)
"On My Way" (featuring The Green)	2023	— (Note: "On My Way" did not enter the NZ Top 40 Singles Chart, but peaked at number 12 on the NZ Hot Singles Chart.)	20		TBA
"I Want More" (featuring Tawaz)	2023	— (Note: "I Want More" did not enter the NZ Top 40 Singles Chart, but peaked at number 16 on the NZ Hot Singles Chart.)	20		TBA
"See You Like I Do"	2024	— (Note: "See You Like I Do" did not enter the NZ Top 40 Singles Chart, but peaked at number 15 on the NZ Hot Singles Chart.)	—		TBA
"We Ain't Coming Home" (featuring Corrella)	2024	— (Note: "We Ain't Coming Home" did not enter the NZ Top 40 Singles Chart, but peaked at number 18 on the NZ Hot Singles Chart.)	—		TBA
"Waiting by the Bar"	2024	— (Note: "Waiting by the Bar" did not enter the NZ Top 40 Singles Chart, but peaked at number 36 on the NZ Hot Singles Chart.)	—		TBA
"I Do" (featuring Trexx)	2025	— (Note: "I Do" did not enter the NZ Top 40 Singles Chart, but peaked at number 10 on the NZ Hot Singles Chart.)	—		TBA
"You Already Know"	2025	— (Note: "You Already Know" did not enter the NZ Top 40 Singles Chart, but peaked at number 6 on the NZ Hot Singles Chart.)	—		TBA
"Anywhere You Want" (with House of Shem)	2025	— (Note: "Anywhere You Want" did not enter the NZ Top 40 Singles Chart, but peaked at number 34 on the NZ Hot Singles Chart.)	—		TBA
"—" denotes a recording that did not chart.

==== As featured artist ====
Title	Year	Peak chart positions		Certifications	Album
Title	Year	NZ	NZ Artist	Certifications	Album
"Be with You [Remix]" (Deach featuring Pieter T, Tomorrow People, K.One, Sons of Zion, Fortafy, Tyree, Donell Lewis & MzJ)	2013	—	—		Non-album singles
"Sensitive to a Smile" (among Aotearoa Reggae All Stars)	2013	2	1	RMNZ: Gold	Non-album singles
"This Feeling" (Tomorrow People featuring Sons of Zion)	2017	—	—	RMNZ: Gold	Bass & Bassinets
"Help Me Out" (Kings featuring Sons of Zion)	2020	17	6	RMNZ: 3× Platinum	Raplist
"—" denotes a recording that did not chart.

=== Other charted and certified songs ===
Title	Year	Peak chart positions	Certifications	Album
Title	Year	NZ Artist	Certifications	Album
"Universal Love"	2013	—	RMNZ: Gold	Universal Love
"Potere Ana / Drift Away"	2019	7	RMNZ: Gold	Waiata / Anthems
"He Aroha Hinemoa / Love on the Run" (featuring Jackson Owens)	2021	13	RMNZ: Gold	Non-album single
"—" denotes a recording that did not chart.
