= Long Gone (Six60 song) =

2020 single by Six60

Single by Six60

from the album Six60
- Released: 10 March 2020
- Genre: Pop
- Length: 2:58
- Label: Epic, Massive
- Songwriters: Big Taste; E. Kidd Bogart; Malay; Marlon Gerbes; Matiu Walters
- Producers: Big Taste; Malay

Six60 singles chronology
"Never Enough" (2019)	"Long Gone" (2020)	"Sundown" (2020)

"Long Gone" is a song by New Zealand band Six60, released as the fifth single from their third album Six60 in March 2020.

== Background and composition ==
The song was written in Los Angeles in collaboration with New Zealand songwriter Leroy Clampitt, also known as Big Taste. "Long Gone" was written as a break-up song, and only took minutes to be written. The band first performed the track at Western Springs Stadium in Auckland in early 2019, over a year before the song's eventual release.

== Release and promotion ==
The song was released as a single at the end of their 2020 summer tour of New Zealand. During the release of the band's third album Six60 in November 2019, the group performed the song live for the radio station ZM.

== Credits and personnel ==
Credits adapted from Tidal.

- Wally Arowora – background vocalist
- Big Taste – production, songwriting
- E. Kidd Bogart – songwriting
- Matt Chamberlain – drums
- Jon DeCuir – background vocalist
- Shameka Dwight – background vocalist
- Ji Fraser – guitar
- Chris Galland – mixing engineer
- Marlon Gerbes – guitar, keyboards songwriting
- Aja Grant – background vocalist
- Romaine Jones – background vocalist
- Candace Lacy – background vocalist
- Judah Lacy – background vocalist
- Precious Lacy – background vocalist
- Chris Mac – bass guitar
- Malay – production, songwriting
- Manny Marroquin – mixer
- Eli Paewai – drums
- Keisha Renee – background vocalist
- Alex Threat-Arowora – background vocalist
- Matiu Walters – songwriting, vocals

== Charts ==
=== Weekly charts ===
Chart (2020)	Peak position
New Zealand (Recorded Music NZ)	5

=== Year-end charts ===
Chart (2020)	Position
New Zealand (Recorded Music NZ)	14
Chart (2021)	Position
New Zealand (Recorded Music NZ)	48

== Certifications ==
Certifications for "Long Gone"
Region	Certification	Certified units/sales
New Zealand (RMNZ)	6× Platinum	180,000^{‡}
^{‡} Sales+streaming figures based on certification alone.
