= Drax Project =

New Zealand pop band

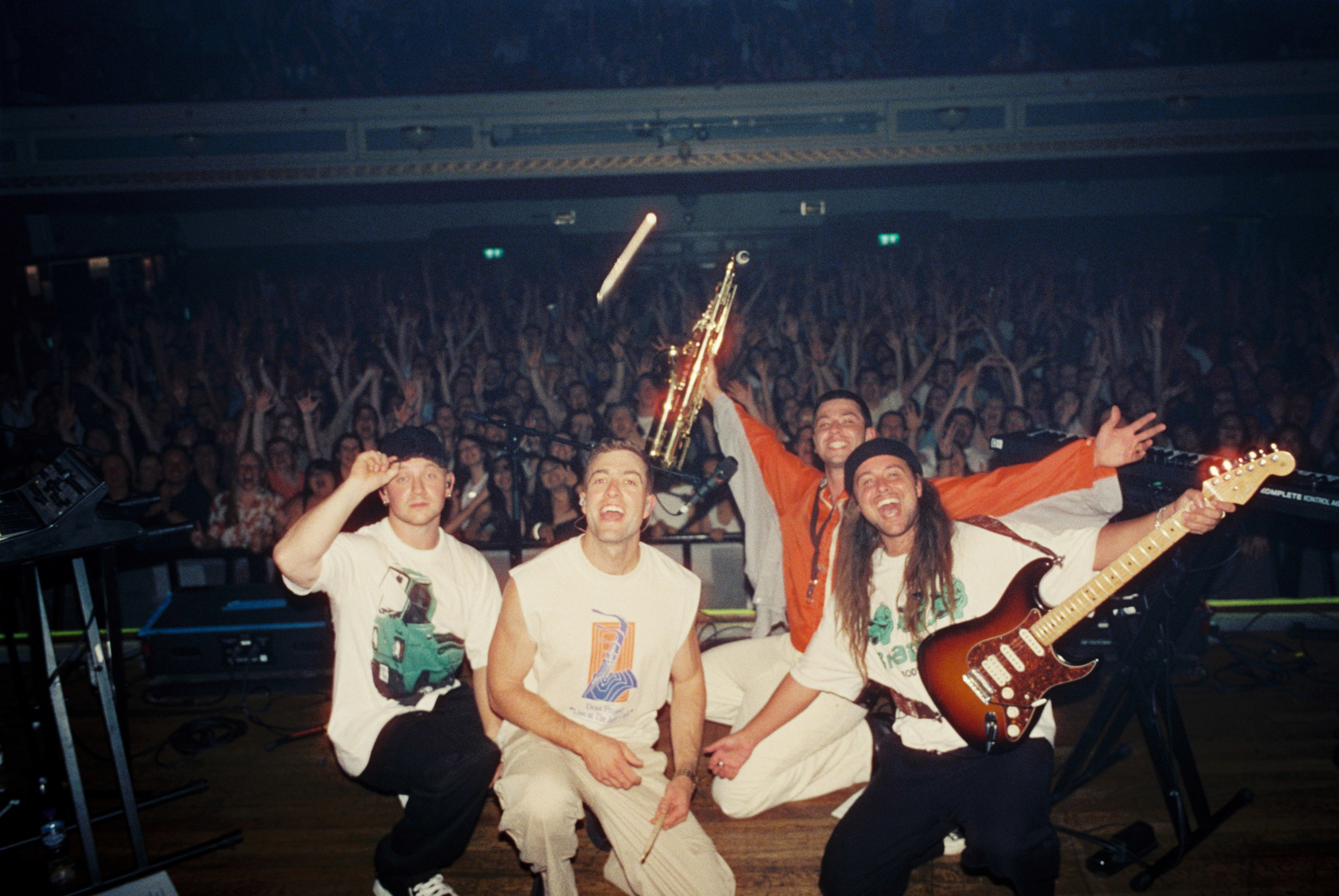
- Drax Project in London in 2025

Background information
- Origin: Wellington, New Zealand
- Genres: Pop; R&B; jazz; hip hop
- Years active: 2014–present
- Labels: Universal; 300 Entertainment
- Members: Sam Thomson; Shaan Singh; Matt Beachen; Ben O'Leary
- Website: http://www.draxproject.com

Drax Project are a New Zealand pop and R&B band that formed in Te Aro, Wellington in 2014. Recording a mix of jazz, R&B and pop music, the band came to prominence in 2017 with the single "Woke Up Late", which was certified triple platinum by RIANZ while the 2019 version featuring Hailee Steinfeld was certified triple platinum in Australia.

== Background ==
Drax Project playing at Hnry Stadium before a Wellington Phoenix football match in October 2026.

Drax Project's members are all originally from different towns in New Zealand; Shaan grew up in Kapiti, Matt in Upper Hutt, Sam in New Plymouth and Ben from Waihi Beach. Matt and Shaan met at a young musician's jazz programme in Wellington as young teens and played separately and together in high school jazz competitions around New Zealand as teens. Matt and Shaan started busking together in their first year of attending university at The New Zealand School Of Music's jazz programme. Sam and Ben joined as Sam also attended the same university school of music and Ben at Whitirea University's music programme not far from Wellington. Drax Project; composed of Shaan Singh on saxophone and Matt Beachen on drums (the origin of the band's name is a portmanteau of 'drums' and 'sax'). Drax Project mostly performed pop song covers while busking at Courtenay Place, Wellington and performing at local bars and events. Double bassist Sam Thomson joined shortly after, and guitarist Ben O'Leary joined the band a year after, when the band made the switch to creating original material. All members were jazz students at the New Zealand School of Music, except for O'Leary who studied music at Whitireia New Zealand.

In August 2014, the band released their first extended play to Bandcamp. A friend of O'Leary's produced the extended play as a part of his final year assignment for music school. The exposure from the extended play allowed Drax Project to be booked for summer festivals in 2014–2015. In 2016, the group released their second extended play, T/W/OO, through Universal. It was produced by founding Shapeshifter member Devin Abrams. The extended play's first single "Cold" was successful on Spotify, reaching #1 on their viral chart and being streamed over 160,000 times in three months. In 2017, Drax Project opened for Lorde's Auckland concert of her Melodrama World Tour in November 2017, as well as New Zealand band Six60.

In November 2017, the band released the song "Woke Up Late". It gained popularity over the next few months on Spotify and was widely played on New Zealand radio stations. In March, Drax Project opened for Ed Sheeran's three Auckland performances of his ÷ Tour in March 2018 (currently the largest-scale concert held in New Zealand as of 2018). By April, "Woke Up Late" had been certified Platinum by the RIANZ. In March, the band were featured on "Light", the third single from U.S. rapper Famous Dex's 2018 album Dex Meets Dexter. In June 2018, the group opened for the European leg of Camila Cabello's Never Be the Same Tour.

In January 2019, a new version of "Woke Up Late" was released, featuring American singer Hailee Steinfeld. In June 2019, they released the single "All This Time". The group opened for Christina Aguilera during her 2019 European concert tour. In September 2019, the group released the single "Catching Feelings" with Six60. Their debut, self-titled studio album was released on 27 September 2019. They released the single "Firefly" featuring Fetty Wap and AACACIA in October 2020.

== Discography ==
=== Studio albums ===
Title	Album details	Peak chart positions	Certifications
Title	Album details	NZ	Certifications
Drax Project	Released: 27 September 2019; Label: Drax Project, Universal; Format: CD, digital download, streaming	2	RMNZ: 2× Platinum
Upside	Released: 24 November 2023; Label: Drax Project, Universal; Format: LP, digital download, streaming	33	

=== Extended plays ===
Title	EP details	Peak chart positions	Certifications
Title	EP details	NZ	Certifications
Drax Project EP	Released: 3 August 2014; Label: Drax Project Limited; Format: Digital download, streaming	—	
T/W/OO	Released: 1 April 2016; Label: Drax Project Limited, Universal; Format: Digital download, streaming	18	
Covers (Live)	Released: 26 May 2017; Label: Drax Project Limited, Universal; Format: Digital download, streaming	40	
Noon	Released: 8 June 2018; Label: Drax Project Limited, Universal; Format: Digital download, streaming	10	RMNZ: Gold
Noon (Acoustic)	Released: 26 April 2019; Label: Drax Project Limited, Universal; Format: Digital download, streaming	—	
Diamond	Released: 8 July 2022; Label: Drax Project Limited, Universal; Format: Digital download, streaming	—	
Blind Beat	Released: 9 December 2022; Label: Drax Project Limited; Format: Digital download, streaming	—	
"—" denotes an extended play that did not chart.

=== Singles ===
==== As lead artist ====
Title	Year	Peak chart positions				Certifications	Album
Title	Year	NZ	NZ Artist	AUS	US Pop	Certifications	Album
"Cold"	2016	—	15	—	—		T/W/OO
"Came to Me"	2016	—	—	—	—		T/W/OO
"Falling Out of Sight"	2016	—	14	—	—		Non-album singles
"So Lost"	2016	—	— (Note: "So Lost" did not enter the NZ Artist Top 40 Singles Chart, but peaked at number 1 on the NZ Artists Heatseeker Singles Chart.)	—	—		Non-album singles
"Woke Up Late"	2017	15	1	—	—		Noon
"Toto"	2018	—	3	—	—	RMNZ: 2× Platinum	Noon
"Woke Up Late" (featuring Hailee Steinfeld)	2019	35	1	18	29	ARIA: 6× Platinum; RMNZ: 7× Platinum	Drax Project
"All This Time"	2019	21	1	—	—	RMNZ: 2× Platinum	Drax Project
"Catching Feelings" (featuring Six60)	2019	3	1	43	—	RMNZ: 9× Platinum; ARIA: 3× Platinum	Drax Project
"Relax"	2020	— (Note: "Relax" did not enter the Official New Zealand Music Chart, but peaked at number 7 on the Hot 40 Singles chart.)	14	—	—	RMNZ: Gold	Drax Project
"Firefly" (Drax Project & Fetty Wap featuring Aacacia)	2020	27	10	—	—	RMNZ: Platinum	Non-album singles
"Tukituki Te Manawa"	2020	— (Note: "Tukituki Te Manawa" did not enter the NZ Top 40 Singles Chart, but peaked at number 10 on the NZ Hot Singles Chart.)	—	—	—		Non-album singles
"Over It"	2021	— (Note: "Over It" did not enter the NZ Top 40 Singles Chart, but peaked at number two on the NZ Hot Singles Chart.)	15	—	—	RMNZ: Gold	Non-album singles
"Crazy"	2022	— (Note: "Crazy" did not enter the NZ Top 40 Singles Chart, but peaked at number two on the NZ Hot Singles Chart.)	—	—	—		Diamond
"Mad at You"	2022	— (Note: "Mad at You" did not enter the NZ Top 40 Singles Chart, but peaked at number seven on the NZ Hot Singles Chart.)	—	—	—		Diamond
"Fashion Sense"	2022	— (Note: "Fashion Sense" did not enter the NZ Top 40 Singles Chart, but peaked at number 16 on the NZ Hot Singles Chart.)	—	—	—		Diamond
"Ka Taria" (Rob Ruha and Drax Project)	2022	— (Note: "Ka Taria" did not enter the NZ Top 40 Singles Chart, but peaked at number 17 on the NZ Hot Singles Chart.)	20	—	—		Non-album single
"Gameboy Color"	2022	— (Note: "Gameboy Color" did not enter the NZ Top 40 Singles Chart, but peaked at number 10 on the NZ Hot Singles Chart.)	—	—	—		Blind Beat
"Atmosphere"	2023	— (Note: "Atmosphere" did not enter the NZ Top 40 Singles Chart, but peaked at number five on the NZ Hot Singles Chart.)	11	—	—		Upside
"Disrespect" (featuring Charley)	2023	— (Note: "Disrespect" did not enter the NZ Top 40 Singles Chart, but peaked at number 15 on the NZ Hot Singles Chart.)	13	—	—		Upside
"Oh My"	2023	— (Note: "Oh My" did not enter the NZ Top 40 Singles Chart, but peaked at number 14 on the NZ Hot Singles Chart.)	20	—	—		Upside
"Luxury"	2023	— (Note: "Luxury" did not enter the Official Top 40 Singles Chart, but peaked at number 7 on the Hot 40 Singles Chart.)	16	—	—		Upside
"Around U" (with Peking Duk and Kita Alexander)	2025	— (Note: "Around U" did not enter the Official Top 40 Singles Chart, but peaked at number 23 on the Hot 40 Singles Chart.)	—	—	—		TBA
"Summer Rain"	2025	— (Note: "Summer Rain" did not enter the Official Top 40 Singles Chart, but peaked at number 12 on the Hot 40 Singles Chart.)	—	—	—		TBA
"24/7"	2026	— (Note: "24/7" did not enter the Official Top 40 Singles Chart, but peaked at number 7 on the Hot 40 Singles Chart.)	—	—	—		TBA
"DADA"	2026	— (Note: "DADA" did not enter the Official Top 40 Singles Chart, but peaked at number 14 on the Hot 40 Singles Chart.)	—	—	—		TBA
"—" denotes a recording that did not chart.

==== As featured artist ====
Title	Year	Peak chart positions		Album
Title	Year	NZ Hot	NZ Artist Heat.	Album
"Light" (Famous Dex featuring Drax Project)	2018	—	2	Dex Meets Dexter
"Solace" (Imugi 이무기 featuring Drax Project)	2022	20	—	Non-album single
"Castaway" (Spencer Coyle featuring Drax Project)	2023	38	—	Non-album single
"—" denotes a recording that did not chart.

=== Other charted songs ===
Title	Year	Peak chart positions		Certifications	Album
Title	Year	NZ Hot	NZ Artist	Certifications	Album
"Cry Me a River / Higher Ground" (live)	2017	—	18		Covers (Live)
"Pony" (live)	2017	—	19		Covers (Live)
"Latch" (live)	2017	—	— (Note: "Latch" (live), a cover of the Disclosure song of the same name featuring Sam Smith, did not enter the NZ Top 40 Singles Chart, but peaked at number 5 on the NZ Artists Heatseeker Singles Chart.)		Covers (Live)
"Only Us"	2018	38	10	RMNZ: Platinum	Noon
"Prefer"	2018	8	8	RMNZ: Platinum	Noon
"Sidebit"	2018	—	— (Note: "Sidebit" did not enter the NZ Artists Top 40 Singles Chart, but peaked at number 1 on the NZ Artists Singles Heatseekers Chart.)		Noon
"I Moeroa / Woke Up Late"	2019	9	6		Waiata / Anthems
"Smart Love"	2019	3	6	RMNZ: Gold	Drax Project
"Natural Selection"	2019	10	— (Note: "Natural Selection" did not enter the NZ Artist Top 40 Singles Chart, but peaked at number 4 on the NZ Artists Hot 20 Singles Chart.)		Drax Project
"Brain"	2019	5	— (Note: "Brain" did not enter the NZ Artist Top 40 Singles Chart, but peaked at number 2 on the NZ Artists Hot 20 Singles Chart.)		Drax Project
"Hollywood"	2022	4	—		Diamond
"In and Out"	2022	24	—		Blind Beat
"—" denotes a recording that did not chart.

== Tours ==
Supporting

- Melodrama World Tour (for Lorde) (2017)
- ÷ Tour (for Ed Sheeran) (2018)
- Never Be the Same Tour (for Camila Cabello) (2018)
- The X Tour (for Christina Aguilera) (2019)
Notes

Notes

- The band opened for Lorde's Auckland, New Zealand show on 12 November.
- The band opened for Ed Sheeran's Auckland, New Zealand shows on 24–26 March.
- The band was the opening act for the European leg of the Never Be the Same Tour.
- The band opened for Christina Aguilera on select dates on Europe.
