= Woke Up Late =

2017 song by Drax Project

Single by Drax Project

from the EP Noon
- Released: 2 November 2017
- Genre: Pop
- Length: 3:02
- Label: 300
- Songwriters: Devin Abrams; Shaan Singh; Matt Beachen; Ben O'Leary; Sam Thomson
- Producer: Devin Abrams

Drax Project singles chronology
"So Lost" (2016)	"Woke Up Late" (2017)	"Toto" (2018)

"Woke Up Late" is a song by New Zealand band Drax Project, originally released in November 2017. It reached number 15 on the New Zealand Singles Chart and was included on their 2018 EP Noon.

== Background ==
In September 2019, Drax Project re-recorded the song for Waiata / Anthems, a collection of re-recorded New Zealand pop songs to promote te Wiki o te Reo Māori (Māori Language Week). The new version, retitled "I Moeroa / Woke Up Late", featured lyrics reinterpreted by scholar Tīmoti Kāretu. This version reached number six on the New Zealand artists' singles chart. On April 25, 2025, a third version was released featuring Malaysian-Australian singer Che'Nelle as part of the band's promotion tour in Japan.

== Track listing ==
Digital download
No.	Title	Length
1.	"Woke Up Late"	3:02

Digital download – Royale Avenue remix
No.	Title	Length
1.	"Woke Up Late" (Royale Avenue Remix)	2:58

Digital download – Lash remix
No.	Title	Length
1.	"Woke Up Late" (Lash Remix)	3:13

Digital download – Andrew Trigger remix
No.	Title	Length
1.	"Woke Up Late" (Adam Trigger Remix)	3:55

== Charts ==
=== Weekly charts ===
Chart (2017–18)	Peak position
New Zealand (Recorded Music NZ)	15

=== Year-end charts ===
Chart (2018)	Position
New Zealand (Recorded Music NZ)	34

== Certifications ==
Region	Certification	Certified units/sales
New Zealand (RMNZ)	7× Platinum	210,000^{‡}
^{‡} Sales+streaming figures based on certification alone.

== Release history ==
Release dates and formats for "Woke Up Late"
Region	Date	Format	Original	Label	Ref.
Various	16 March 2018	Digital download; streaming	Original	300	
Australia	30 March 2018	Contemporary hit radio	Original	300	
Various	12 October 2018	Digital download; streaming	Royale Avenue Remix	300	
Various	26 October 2018	Digital download; streaming	Lash Remix	300	
Various	9 November 2018	Digital download; streaming	Adam Trigger Remix	300	
United States	5 February 2019	Contemporary hit radio	Original	300	
Various	25 April 2025	Digital download; streaming	featuring Che'Nelle	Universal Music Australia	

== Drax Project and Hailee Steinfeld version ==
"Woke Up Late"

Single by Drax Project featuring Hailee Steinfeld

from the album Drax Project
- Released: 21 January 2019
- Genre: Pop
- Length: 3:01
- Label: 300
- Songwriters: Devin Abrams; Shaan Singh; Matt Beachen; Ben O'Leary; Hailee Steinfeld; Sam Thomson
- Producer: Devin Abrams

Drax Project singles chronology
"Toto" (2018)	"Woke Up Late" (2019)	"All This Time" (2019)

Hailee Steinfeld singles chronology
"Back to Life" (2018)	"Woke Up Late" (2019)	"Afterlife" (2019)

The duet version featuring American actress and singer Hailee Steinfeld was released on 21 January 2019 as the lead single from their self-titled debut studio album (2019).

=== Background ===
The band said that it "cross[ed] our minds while writing it as to how it might work as a duet -- with a female voice telling her side", and so they reached out to Steinfeld as they liked her songs "Starving" and "Let Me Go". The collaboration happened after Drax Project toured with singer Camila Cabello. A member of Cabello's team was good friends with Steinfeld, and after showing her the song, she loved it and asked the band to be a featured vocalist on the track. iHeartRadio noted how the song "tells the story of sleeping in after a wild night out, realizing you're at someone else's house".

In March 2019, the version featuring Hailee Steinfeld was featured in an episode of CBS's MacGyver. In May 2019, a remix of the song by Sam Feldt was released.

=== Chart performance ===
The duet version peaked at number 29 on the Mainstream Top 40, 18 in the Australia and 35 in New Zealand.

=== Music video ===
The official music video was released to the band's YouTube channel on 9 April 2019. It was directed by Jonathon Singer-Vine and filmed in Los Angeles. It features American YouTuber Liza Koshy.

=== Critical reception ===
Billboard called the song a "fizzy pop track" and complimented both the band and Steinfield's "sweet falsettos". Idolator labelled the song a "hit" and an "anthem", and said Steinfeld's feature "adds another perspective to the ode to a developing relationship". The Official Charts Company named Drax Project "one to watch" and said the track "gives a pretty good impression of their overall sound", which it described as a "healthy mix of pop, dance and hip-hop".

=== Track listing ===
Digital download
No.	Title	Length
1.	"Woke Up Late" (featuring Hailee Steinfeld)	3:01

Digital download – Sam Feldt remix
No.	Title	Length
1.	"Woke Up Late" (featuring Hailee Steinfeld) (Sam Feldt remix)	3:16

=== Charts ===
==== Weekly charts ====
Chart (2019)	Peak position
Australia (ARIA)	18
New Zealand (Recorded Music NZ)	35
US Pop Airplay (Billboard)	29

==== Year-end charts ====
Chart (2019)	Position
Australia (ARIA)	40
New Zealand (Recorded Music NZ)	44

=== Certifications ===
Region	Certification	Certified units/sales
Australia (ARIA)	6× Platinum	420,000^{‡}
New Zealand (RMNZ)	4× Platinum	120,000^{‡}
^{‡} Sales+streaming figures based on certification alone.

=== Release history ===
Release dates and formats for "Woke Up Late (Remix)"
Region	Date	Format	Original	Label	Ref.
Various	21 January 2019	Digital download; streaming	Original	300	
Various	2 May 2019	Digital download; streaming	Sam Feldt Remix	300	
