= New Zealand top 50 singles of 2022 =

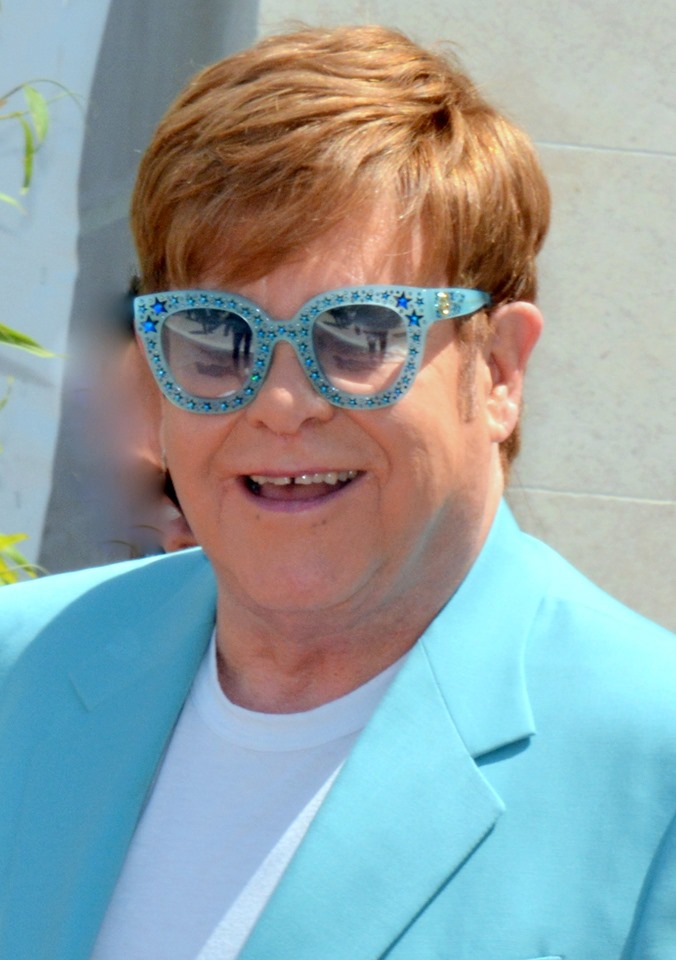
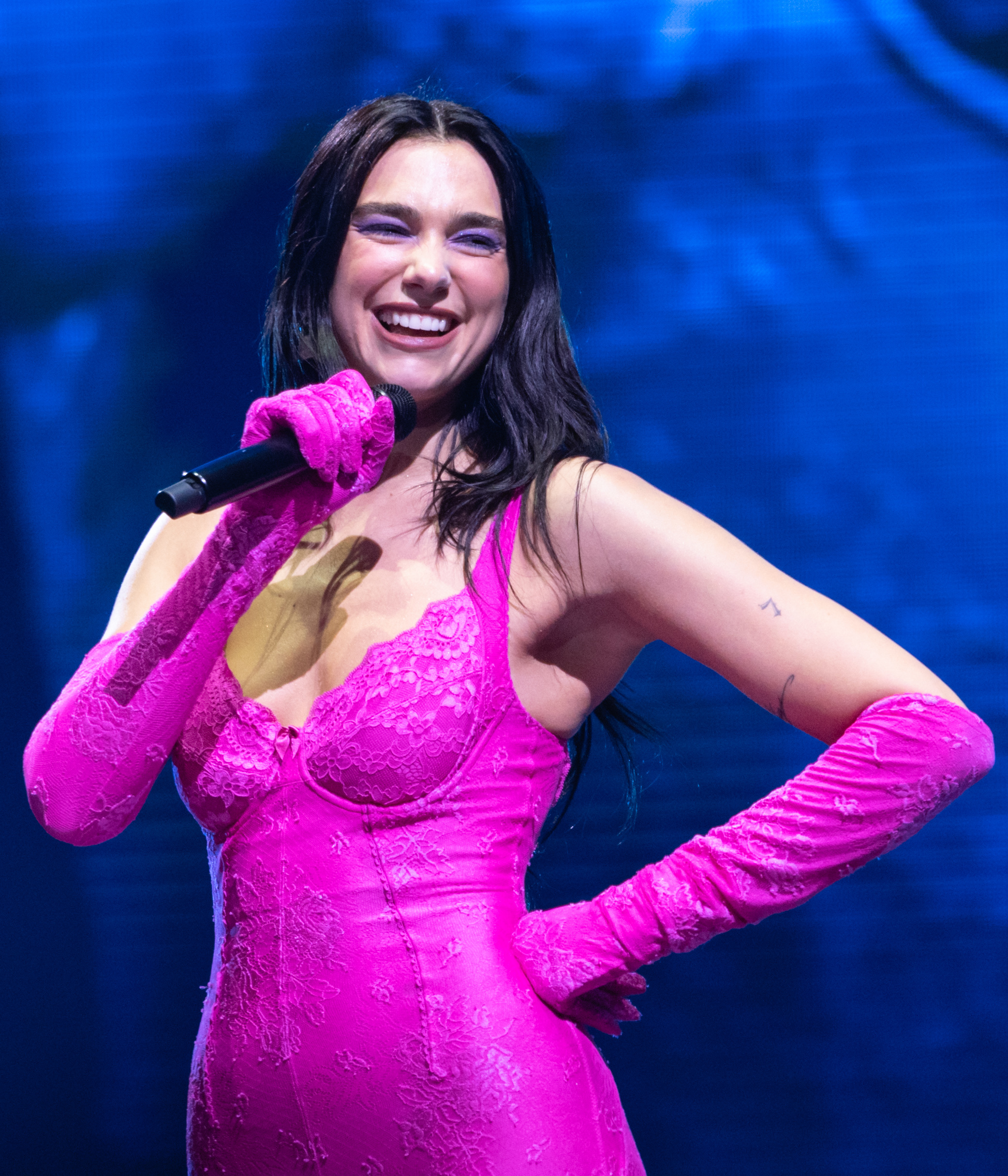
"Cold Heart (Pnau remix)", a collaboration between British musicians Elton John and Dua Lipa was the top song of 2022 in New Zealand.

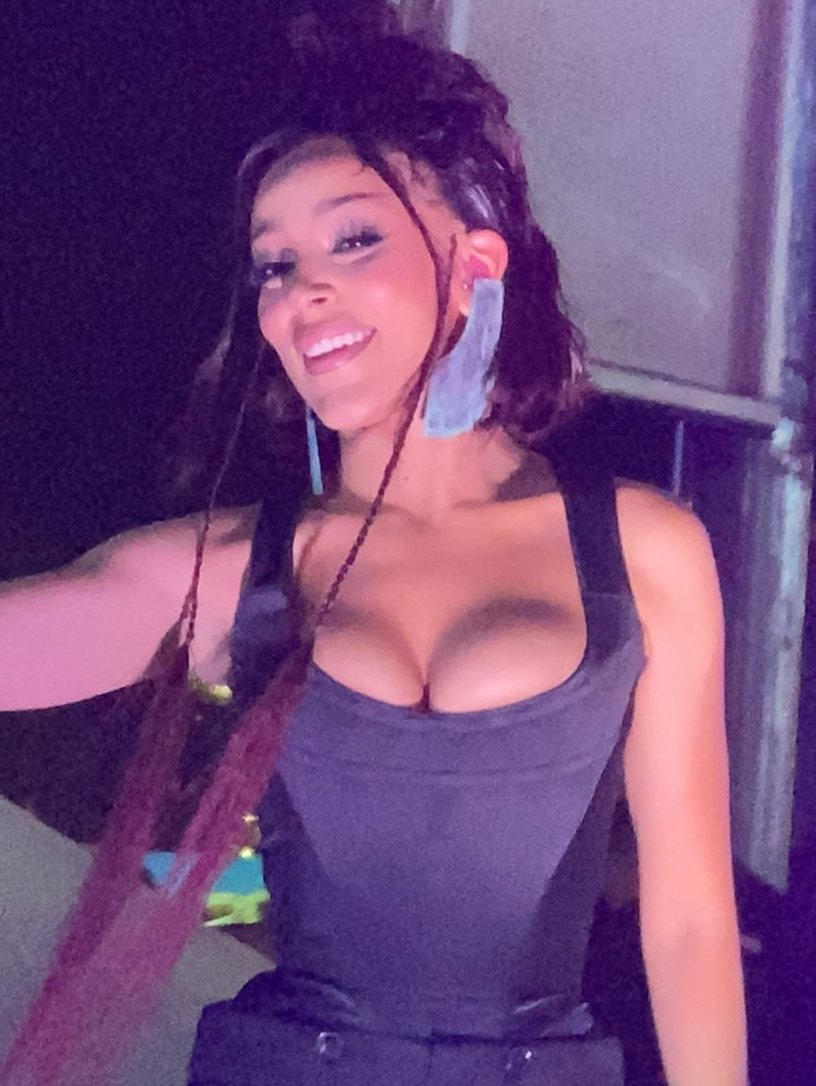
American singer Doja Cat released four of the top 50 singles of 2022

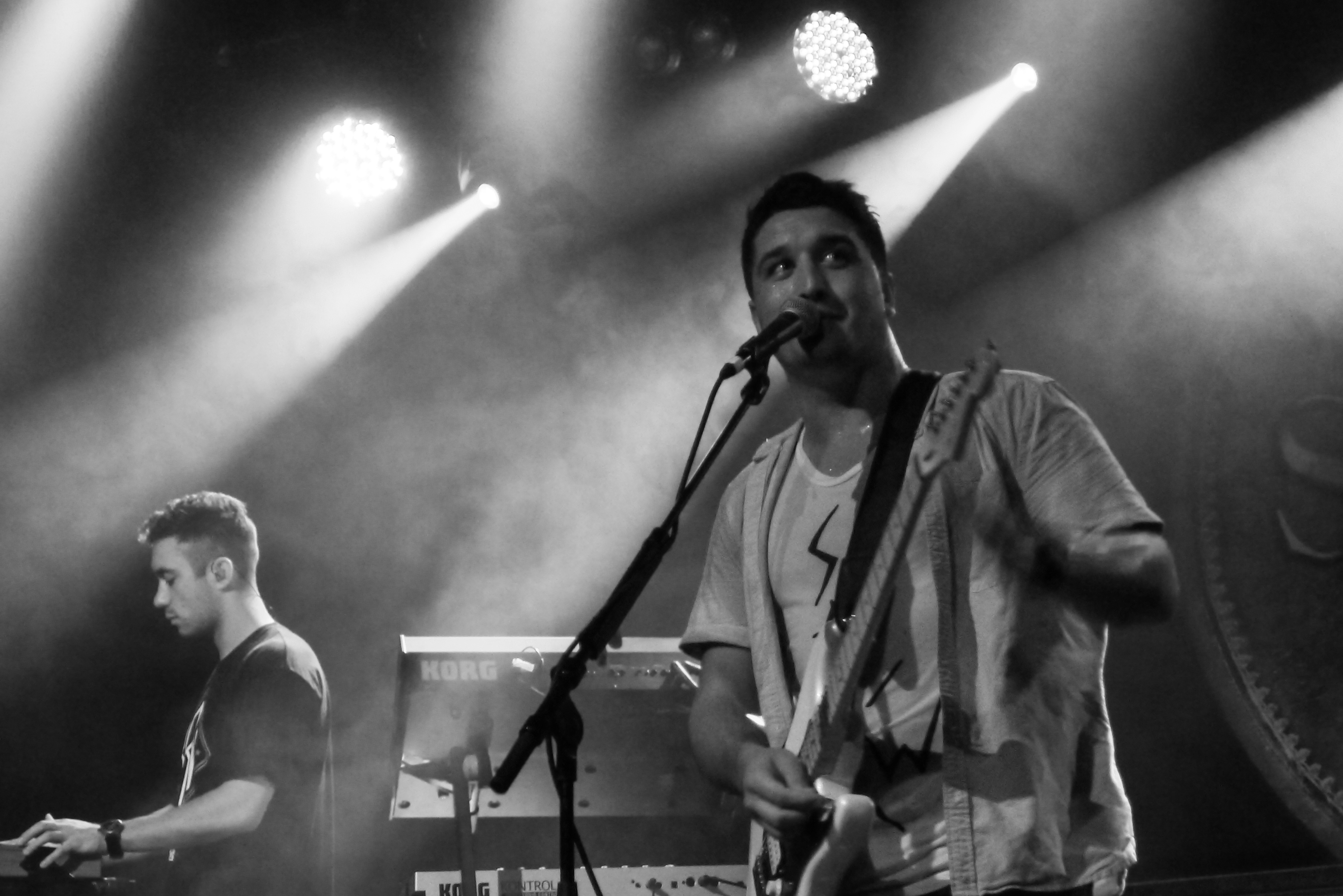
New Zealand band Six60's song "Pepeha" was the top song sung in Māori for both 2021 and 2022.

This is a list of the top-selling singles in New Zealand for 2022 from the Official New Zealand Music Chart's end-of-year chart, compiled by Recorded Music NZ. Recorded Music NZ also published 2022 lists for two sub-charts, the top 20 singles released by New Zealand artists, and the top 20 singles primarily performed in te reo Māori.

== Chart ==
Key
† – Song of New Zealand origin (Note: Whether or not a song is of New Zealand origin is determined by the Recorded Music NZ.)

Rank	Artist	Song
1	Elton John and Dua Lipa	"Cold Heart (Pnau remix)"
2	Harry Styles	"As It Was"
3	Glass Animals	"Heat Waves"
4	Luude featuring Colin Hay	"Down Under"
5	Cat Burns	"Go (Goddard. Remix)"
6	L.A.B.	"In the Air"
7	Ed Sheeran	"Shivers"
8	Jack Harlow	"First Class"
9	Ed Sheeran	"Bad Habits"
10	The Kid Laroi and Justin Bieber	"Stay"
11	Fleetwood Mac	"Dreams"
12	L.A.B.	"Mr Reggae"
13	OneRepublic	"I Ain't Worried"
14	Adele	"Easy On Me"
15	King George	"Friday Night"
16	Imagine Dragons	"Enemy"
17	Lil Nas X featuring Jack Harlow	"Industry Baby"
18	Dua Lipa featuring DaBaby	"Levitating"
19	Chris Brown	"Under the Influence"
20	Gayle	"ABCDEFU"
21	Lizzo	"About Damn Time"
22	Lost Frequencies and Calum Scott	"Where Are You Now"
23	J. Cole	"No Role Modelz"
24	Latto	"Big Energy"
25	L.A.B.	"Controller"
26	Justin Bieber	"Ghost"
27	The Weeknd and Ariana Grande	"Save Your Tears (Remix)"
28	Joji	"Glimpse of Us"
29	Kate Bush	"Running Up That Hill (A Deal with God)"
30	Frank Ocean	"Lost"
31	Luude and Mattafix	"Big City Life"
32	Doja Cat	"Vegas"
33	Doja Cat	"Woman"
34	Sam Smith and Kim Petras	"Unholy"
35	L.A.B.	"Under the Sun"
36	Billie Eilish	"Happier Than Ever"
37	Doja Cat featuring SZA	"Kiss Me More"
38	Future featuring Drake and Tems	"Wait for U"
39	L.A.B.	"Why Oh Why"
40	Steve Lacy	"Bad Habit"
41	Coterie	"Cool It Down"
42	Post Malone and Doja Cat	"I Like You (A Happier Song)"
43	Olivia Rodrigo	"Good 4 U"
44	Various	"We Don't Talk About Bruno"
45	Acraze featuring Cherish	"Do It to It"
46	Elley Duhé	"Middle of the Night"
47	Tom Odell	"Another Love"
48	Lil Nas X	"That's What I Want"
49	The Neighbourhood	"Sweater Weather"
50	Nicky Youre and Dazy	"Sunroof"

== Top 20 singles of 2022 by New Zealand artists ==
Rank	Artist	Song
1	L.A.B.	"In the Air"
2	L.A.B.	"Mr Reggae"
3	L.A.B.	"Controller"
4	L.A.B.	"Under the Sun"
5	L.A.B.	"Why Oh Why"
6	Coterie	"Cool It Down"
7	Six60	"Don't Forget Your Roots"
8	Ka Hao featuring Rob Ruha	"35"
9	Six60	"Someone to Be Around"
10	Lee Mvtthews featuring NÜ	"Takeover"
11	Six60	"Pepeha"
12	L.A.B.	"Yes I Do"
13	Six60	"All She Wrote"
14	Sons of Zion featuring Jackson Owens	"Love on the Run"
15	Muroki	"Wavy"
16	Bina Butta featuring Kennyon Brown	"Lady Love"
17	Six60	"Before You Leave"
18	Shouse	"Love Tonight"
19	SWIDT featuring Lomez Brown	"Kelz Garage"
20	Jolyon Petch	"Dreams"

== Top 20 singles of 2022 sung in te reo Māori ==
Rank	Artist	Song
1	Six60	"Pepeha"
2	Ka Hao featuring Rob Ruha	"35"
3	Uru Whetu featuring Torere and Te Aroha	"Taku Raumiri"
4	Sons of Zion featuring Jackson Owens	"He Aroha Hinemoa (Love on the Run)"
5	Various Artists	"Ka Mānu"
6	Rob Ruha	"Taera"
7	Maimoa	"Wairua"
8	Stan Walker	"Matemateāone"
9	Te Matatini and Ngā Tūmanako	"Waerea"
10	Te Matatini and Te Pikikōtuku o Ngāti Rongomai featuring Whenua Patuwai	"Te Ata Māhina"
11	Coterie	"Purea / Cool It Down"
12	Te Matatini and te Tū Mataora featuring Matakāinga Artists	"Hunara"
13	Te Matatini and Te Kapa Haka o te Whānau a Apanui	"Hai ō mō Apanui"
14	Origin Roots Aotearoa (O.R.A.)	"Tuakiritanga"
15	Creative Nātives	"Ngā Iwi E" (Live)
16	Te Matatini and Te Whare Wānanga o Waikato	"Rongomai"
17	Te Matatini and Hātea Kapa Haka featuring Maimoa	"Waiora"
18	Te Matatini and Ōpōtiki-Mai-Tawhiti featuring Ria Hall	"E Tama Hikairo"
19	Papa's Pack	"Muriwhenua Waiata"
20	Rob Ruha and Drax Project	"Ka Taria"
