= Matemateāone =

2021 single by Stan Walker

Single by Stan Walker

from the album Te Arohanui / All In
- Language: Māori, English
- Released: 9 October 2021
- Genre: Pop
- Length: 2:49
- Label: Sony Music Entertainment New Zealand
- Songwriters: Devin Abrams; Mikey Dam; Isiah Ngawaka; Matthew Sadgrove; Ruth Smith; Stan Walker
- Producers: Devin Abrams, Matthew Sadgrove

Stan Walker singles chronology
"Tau Te Mārire / Take It Easy" (2021)	"Matemateāone" (2021)	"Come Back Home" (2021)

Music video
- "Matemateāone" on YouTube

"Matemateāone" (English: "Deep Affection") is a song by New Zealand musician Stan Walker. A bilingual ballad sung primarily in Māori language, the song was released as a single a week before Walker's first album sung in Māori, Te Arohanui. A love ballad, the song's music video celebrates his marriage to his partner Lou Tyson.

The song debuted at number 14 on the New Zealand Artist Singles chart and number 8 on the Hot Singles chart. By the end of 2021, it was the 5th most successful Te Reo Māori song of the year in New Zealand.

== Background and composition ==
In 2014, Walker collaborated with the musicians Ria Hall, Troy Kingi and Maisey Rika on the single "Aotearoa", a Māori language song released to mark te Wiki o te Reo Māori, as a challenge to release the second song in history (after "Poi E" (1984) by the Pātea Māori Club) to top the New Zealand charts. Walker started recording music in Te Reo again in 2018, including "Whakamoemiti" from the extended play Stan, "Moemoeā", Walker's cover of Don't Dream It's Over with Seth Haapu in 2019, and "Tēnā Rā Koe", a Te Reo version of Walker's single "Thank You" (2018) recorded for the Waiata / Anthems compilation album in 2019. In 2020, Walker released the single "Bigger", simultaneously releasing a Te Reo Māori version of the song with his niece Ibanez Maeva.

On 1 September 2021, Walker announced the release of Te Arohanui, an upcoming studio album entirely sung in Te Reo. The announcement was paired with the release of "Tau Te Mārire", a re-recorded version of his single "Take It Easy" (2012).

== Release ==
The song was released on 10 September 2021, one week after the release of "Tau Te Mārire". On the same day, Walker released the music video for the track, featuring footage from his wedding to Lou Tyson. The song was later featured on Walker's 2022 album All In.

The song was later used as the ending theme song for the 2022 Tearepa Kahi film Muru.

== Credits and personnel ==
Credits adapted from Tidal.

- Devin Abrams – producer, composer, lyricist
- Mikey Dam – composer, lyricist
- Simon Gooding – engineer, mixing engineer
- Stuart Hawkes – mastering engineer
- Isiah Ngawaka – composer, lyricist
- Matthew Sadgrove – producer, composer, lyricist
- Ruth Smith – composer, lyricist
- Stan Walker – composer, lyricist, vocalist

== Charts ==
Chart (2021)	Peak position
New Zealand Artist Singles (Recorded Music NZ)	14
New Zealand Hot Singles (Recorded Music NZ)	8
New Zealand Artist Hot Singles (Recorded Music NZ)	5
New Zealand Te Reo Māori Singles (Recorded Music NZ)	3

=== Year-end charts ===
Chart (2021)	Position
New Zealand Te Reo Māori (Recorded Music NZ)	5

== Certification ==
Region	Certification	Certified units/sales
New Zealand (RMNZ)	Gold	15,000^{‡}
^{‡} Sales+streaming figures based on certification alone.
