= Taera =

2021 single by Rob Ruha

Single by Rob Ruha

from the album Preservation of Society
- Language: Māori
- Released: 8 October 2021
- Genre: Pop, contemporary R&B
- Length: 3:22
- Label: InDigiNation Music
- Songwriters: Robert Ruha; Rory Noble
- Producers: Robert Ruha; Rory Noble

Rob Ruha singles chronology
"Taka Rawa" (2021)	"Taera" (2021)	"That's Where I'll Be" (2022)

Music video
- "Taera" on YouTube

"Taera" (English: "Style") is a Māori language song by New Zealand musician Rob Ruha. It was released as the main single from his third studio album Preservation of Society on 8 October 2021. The song was the 7th most commercially successful song sung in Te Reo Māori for 2021.

== Background and composition ==
In September 2021, Ruha co-wrote and produced the song "35" by Te Tairāwhiti youth choir Ka Hao. The song became popular during Te Wiki o te Reo Māori, and was one of the 27 songs produced for the 2021 Waiata Anthems Week, a project to promote popular music sung in Māori. The song first gained popularity during the week when it became a popular on TikTok, later becoming one of the top performing songs in Te Reo Māori for 2021. Ruha collaborated with Ka Hao a second time in September, releasing the track "Taka Rawa".

"Taera" was one of the final songs written for Preservation of Scenery. Ruha wrote the song in 20 minutes while he was preparing to leave home to record the album. The song is sung entirely in Te Reo Māori, and features musicians Troy Kingi and Whenua Patuwai as background vocalists. Ruha feels that "Taewa" is a song that champions diversity and "celebrates Māori Swag".

== Release ==
The song was released as a single on the same day that its parent album Preservation of Society was released. It was promoted simultaneously across all iwi radio stations in New Zealand in October 2021. The song's music video was also released on 8 October, and features mural artwork by Onehunga artist Bobby Macdonald.

== Commercial reception ==
The song debuted at number 11 on the New Zealand Hot Singles Chart, a chart tracking relative changes in sales, streaming and airplay. By the end of 2021, it was the 7th most commercially successful song sung in Te Reo Māori.

== Critical reception ==
Alex Behan of Stuff described the song as having a "glittering glory", praising the song's invigorating lyrics.

== Credits and personnel ==
Credits adapted from Tidal.

- Leo Coghini – keyboards
- Vivek Gabriel – mastering engineer, recording
- Thabani Gapara – saxophone
- James Illingworth – keyboards, synthesizer
- Tyna Keelan – guitar
- Troy Kingi – background vocals
- Johnny Lawrence – bass guitar
- Toby Lloyd – engineer, recording
- Nic Manders – mixer, recording
- Darren Mathiassen – drums
- Christian Mausia – trumpet
- Rory Noble – producer
- Whenua Patuwai – background vocals
- Robert Ruha – vocals, producer, background vocals

== Charts ==
=== Weekly charts ===
Chart (2021)	Peak position
New Zealand Hot Singles (Recorded Music NZ)	11
New Zealand Artist Hot Singles (Recorded Music NZ)	2
New Zealand Te Reo Māori Singles (Recorded Music NZ)	3

=== Year-end charts ===
Chart (2021)	Position
New Zealand Te Reo Māori (Recorded Music NZ)	7
