= Ka Taria =

2022 single by Rob Ruha and Drax Project

Single by Rob Ruha and Drax Project
- Language: Māori, English
- Released: 2 September 2022
- Genre: Pop
- Length: 3:03
- Label: Drax Project
- Songwriters: Benjamin O'Leary; Matt Beachen; Rob Ruha; Sam Thomson; Shaan Singh
- Producer: Drax Project

Rob Ruha singles chronology
"That's Where I'll Be" (2022)	"Ka Taria" (2022)

Drax Project singles chronology
"Fashion Sense" (2022)	"Ka Taria" (2022)	"Gameboy Color" (2022)

"Ka Taria" ("Waiting") is a song by New Zealand musicians Rob Ruha and Drax Project. A song sung in Māori and English, it was released as a single during Te Wiki o te Reo Māori. It was the third Drax Project song released as a part of the Waiata / Anthems project, following "I Moeroa / Woke Up Late", and Ruha's second, after "35". The song debuted at number 17 on the New Zealand Hot Singles chart, the highest position by a New Zealand artist's song that week. By the end of 2022, it was the 20th most successful Te Reo Māori song of the year in New Zealand.

== Background and composition ==
In September 2019, Drax Project took part in Waiata / Anthems, a compilation album of contemporary New Zealand music re-interpreted in Te Reo Māori. They performed "I Moeroa", a re-recording of the band's 2017 single "Woke Up Late" translated by Sir Tīmoti Kāretu and Jeremy Tātere MacLeod. The team behind the production of "I Moeroa" contacted Drax Project after its release, to work on a second song, which led to the release of "Tukituki Te Manawa". Ruha's collaboration single with Te Tairāwhiti, youth choir Ka Hao, "35" (2021), was released during Te Wiki o te Reo Māori 2021 and became a hit single for Ruha and Ka Kao.

Ruha travelled to Wellington to write and record the song with the band in mid-2022, over the course of a few days. The song was written in a collaboration with Ruha and Drax Project, not based on a pre-existing song, and was written about waiting for estranged friends to come back into a person's life.

== Release ==
The collaboration was released on 2 September, a few days before the start of Te Wiki o te Reo Māori. It was one of the top performing Māori language singles during the week.

== Credits and personnel ==
Credits adapted from Tidal.

- Matt Beachen – composer, lyricist, drums
- Drax Project – engineer, producer
- Vicek Gabriel – mastering engineer
- Mic Manders – mixer
- Ben O'Leary – composer, lyricist, guitar
- Rob Ruha – composer, lyricist, vocals
- Shaan Singh – composer, lyricist, saxophone, vocals
- Sam Thomson – composer, lyricist, bass

== Charts ==
Chart (2022)	Peak position
New Zealand Hot Singles (Recorded Music NZ)	17
New Zealand Artist Hot Singles (Recorded Music NZ)	1
New Zealand Te Reo Māori Singles (Recorded Music NZ)	5

=== Year-end charts ===
Chart (2022)	Position
New Zealand Te Reo Māori (Recorded Music NZ)	20
