= Te Wiki o te Reo Māori =

Initiative to promote the use of the Māori language

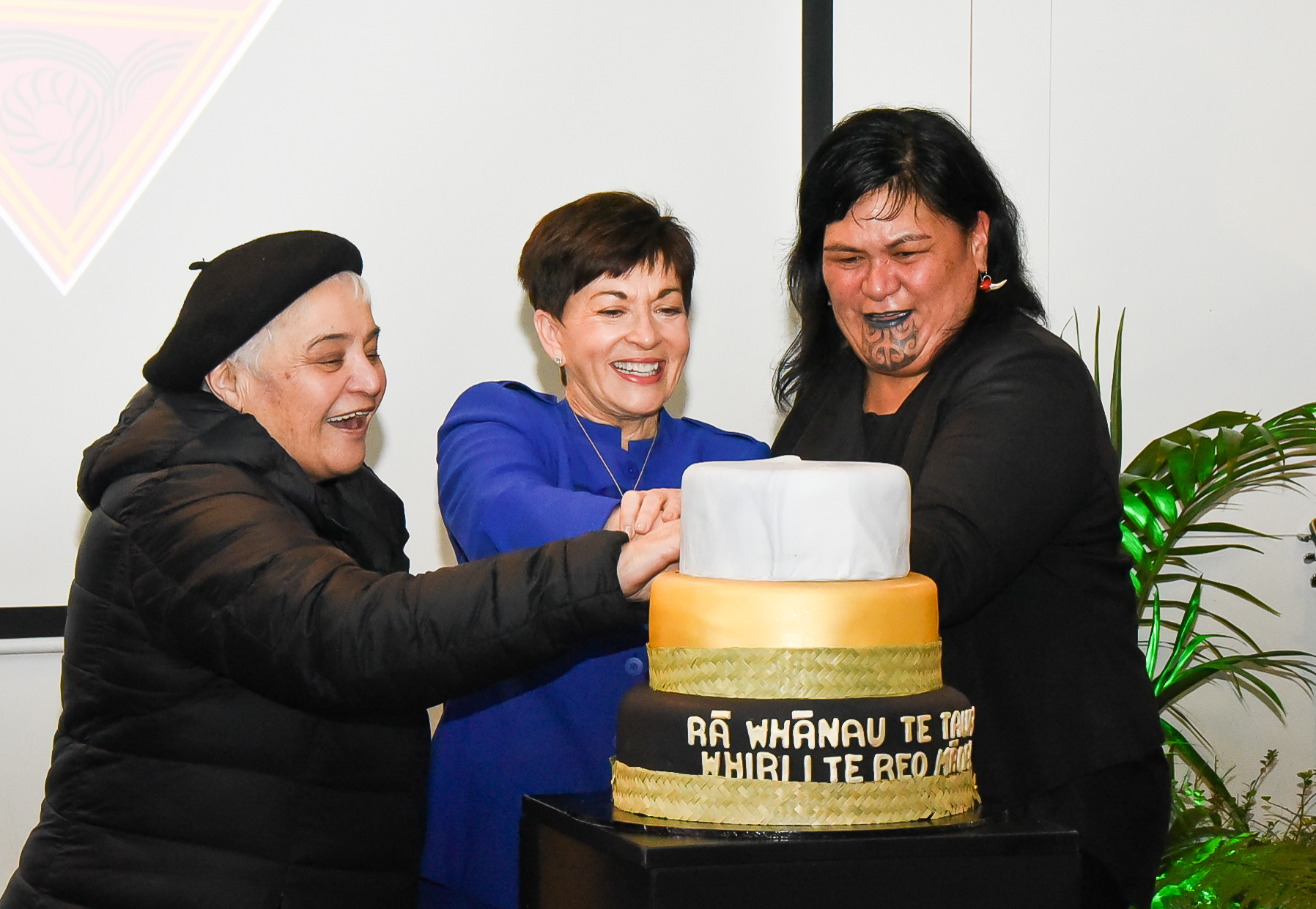
- Tariana Turia, Governor-General Patsy Reddy and Nanaia Mahuta celebrating Māori Language Week 2019
- Observed by: New Zealand
- Observances: Māori language practice and public outreach
- Date: Week of 14 September
- 2026 date: 14–20 September 2026
- 2027 date: 13–19 September 2027
- Duration: 1 week
- Frequency: Annual
- First time: 1975

Te Wiki o te Reo Māori, or Māori Language Week, is a government-sponsored initiative to encourage the use of the Māori language in New Zealand. The week is set to occur every September, for the entire week that includes the 14th. Te Wiki o te Reo Māori is part of a broader movement to revive the Māori language.

Preceded by Māori Language Day from 1972 to 1974, it has been celebrated since 1975 and is currently spearheaded by Te Puni Kōkiri (the Ministry of Māori Development) and the Te Taura Whiri i te Reo Māori (Māori Language Commission), with many organisations including schools, libraries, and government departments participating.

== History ==
In the early 1970s as a part of the Māori protest movement, activist group Ngā Tamatoa, the Te Reo Māori Society of Victoria University, and Te Huinga Rangatahi (the New Zealand Māori Students’ Association) presented a petition to Parliament, petitioned the government to teach te reo in schools. On 14 September 1972, this petition, signed by over 30,000 people was delivered to Parliament, and became a major event in the revitalisation of te reo in New Zealand. 14 September quickly began to be celebrated as Māori Language Day, and by 1975, this had grown to become the first Māori Language Week.

The 1977 week in Dunedin featured "promotion girls" wearing Maori Language Week sashes, handing out Kia ora stickers in The Octagon all week and a two-day hui organised on the city's marae.

=== 2008 ===
The week in 2008 saw the release of Google Māori, a Māori-language translation of the search engine created as a collaboration between Potaua and Nikolasa Biasiny-Tule of Tangatawhenua.com, the Māori Language Commission and Google. The process took over a year and involved more than 40 people on the project, due to the difficulty of translating the technical terminology.

=== 2014 ===
For te Wiki o te Reo Māori in 2014, musicians Stan Walker, Ria Hall, Troy Kingi and Maisey Rika collaborated on the song "Aotearoa", as a challenge to get a second song in te reo to reach number one in New Zealand (after "Poi E" in 1984).

=== 2015 ===
On 2 August 2015 the Black Caps (the New Zealand national cricket team) played under the name of Aotearoa for their first match against Zimbabwe to celebrate Māori Language Week.

=== 2016 ===
Maimoa (then known as Pūkana and Whānau), a musical group created from the presenters of the Māori Television show Pūkana celebrated te Wiki o te Reo Māori by releasing the single "Maimoatia", written with Te Haumihiata Mason. The song topped the iTunes downloads chart in New Zealand, reaching number 4 on the Official New Zealand Music Chart's subchart for New Zealand musicians.

=== 2017 ===
The 2016 Disney film Moana was dubbed into Māori, premiering in Auckland on 11 September as a part of te Wiki o te Reo Māori 2017. Rachel House, Jemaine Clement, Temuera Morrison, and Oscar Kightley, all cast members of the original English language version of the film, reprised their respective roles in the te reo version. During the week, 30 theatres across the country held free screenings of the reo version.

=== 2019 ===
During Māori Language Week 2019, it was reported in New Zealand media that even kaumātua (elders) were learning te reo (Māori language). It was also reported that more than one fifth of book sales during that week were Māori.

To mark the 20th anniversary of the 1999 Rugby World Cup semi-final, where Hinewehi Mohi performed the national anthem in te reo, Mohi created Waiata / Anthems, an album where 11 New Zealand musicians re-recorded songs into te reo Māori. The album debuted at number 1 on the Official New Zealand Music Chart, and was one of the most successful albums of 2019 in New Zealand.

=== 2021 ===
At midday on 14 September 2021, te Wiki o te Reo Māori was celebrated with Te Taura Whiri i te Reo Māori – the Māori Language Moment, where over 1.1 million people pledged to use te reo at the same time. On the same day, the Māori Party launched a petition to change the country's name to Aotearoa.

Due to the success of Waiata / Anthems in 2019, the project was expanded to become Waiata Anthems Week, an annual release of a playlist in te reo Māori, with the goal of making the New Zealand music scene more bilingual. In 2021, more than 30 musicians participated in the project, including Six60, whose single "Pepeha" debuted at number two on the Official New Zealand Music Chart. Te Tairāwhiti (Gisborne Region)-based choir Ka Hao also saw charting success, with their single collaborating with songwriter Rob Ruha, "35" (a reference to State Highway 35), reaching number 25. September saw the release of many albums by popular musicians sung in te reo, including Lorde's Te Ao Mārama, Stan Walker's Te Arohanui, Alien Weaponry's Tangaroa, and Ka Hao's Ka Hao: One Tira, One Voice.

=== 2022 ===
The 2022 celebrations of Te Wiki o te Reo Māori marked 50 years since the Māori Language Petition was presented to parliament. To celebrate Te Wiki o te Reo Māori, Whittaker's released a special edition version of their milk chocolate, rebranded as Miraka Kirīmi (creamy milk) in te reo. The rebranding caused widescale controversy due to racist backlash criticising the rebranding, and sparked a response to support the naming of the chocolate bar in te reo.

The third Waiata / Anthems week was held prior to Te Wiki o te Reo Māori, including over 20 musicians releasing new music in te reo, and a new series of TVNZ documentaries following popular musicians producing Māori language songs. Among the most successful songs from the 2022 waiata include "Whāia te Māramatanga (Walk Right Up)" by Ladi6, a reimagining of Split Enz' "Six Months in a Leaky Boat" (1982) performed by Tim Finn and Hana Mereraiha, a remix of Moana and the Moahunters' 1991 single "AEIOU" by Tiki Taane, and "Ka Taria", performed by Rob Ruha and Drax Project.

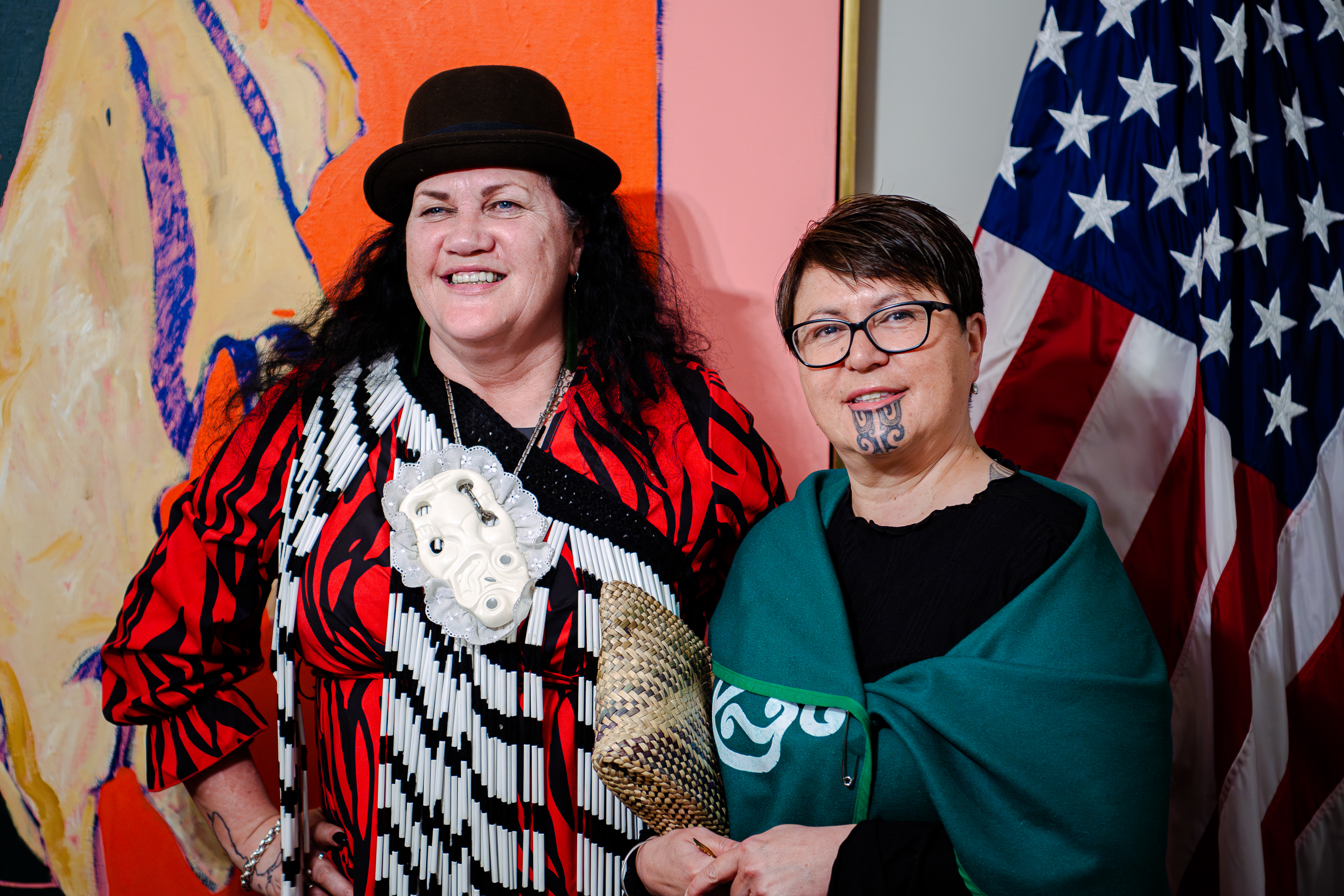
Te Wiki o te Reo Māori Reception at the United States Embassy in Wellington, New Zealand on 19 September 2024

=== 2025 ===
The year 2025 marked 50 years since the first Māori Language Week in 1975. By this milestone, "Te Wiki o te reo Māori has become one of the most recognised public celebrations and nationwide movements in the country".

== Dates and themes ==
Year	Dates	Theme
1972 to 1974	14 September	Māori Language Day
1977	18-24 September	
2004	26 July – 1 August	“Give it a go − kōrero Māori”
2005	25–31 July	
2006	24–30 July	“Kia kaha ake! Give it a go”
2007	23 July – 29 July	Tapoi (Tourism)
2008	21 July – 27 July	"Te Reo i te Kāinga" ("Māori Language in the Home")
2009	27 July – 2 August	"Te Reo i te Hapori" ("Māori Language in the Community")
2010	26 July – 1 August	"Te Mahi Kai" ("The language of food")
2011	4 July – 10 July	"Manaakitanga" ("Hospitality" or "Kindness")
2012	23 July – 29 July	"Arohatia te reo" ("Cherish the language")
2013	1 July – 7 July	"Ngā ingoa Māori" ("Māori names")
2014	21 July – 27 July	"Te kupu o te wiki" ("Word of the week")
2015	27 July – 2 August	"Whāngaia te reo (ki ngā mātua)" ("Nurture the language (in parents)")
2016	4 July – 10 July	"Ākina te reo" ("Behind you all the way")
2017	11–17 September	"Kia ora te reo Māori" ("Let the Māori language live")
2018	10–16 September	"Kia Kaha te Reo Māori" ("‘Let’s make the Māori language strong")
2019	9–15 September	"Kia Kaha te Reo Māori" ("‘Let’s make the Māori language strong")
2020	14–20 September	"Kia Kaha te Reo Māori" ("‘Let’s make the Māori language strong")
2021	13–19 September	"Kia Kaha te Reo Māori" ("‘Let’s make the Māori language strong")
2022	12–18 September	"Kia Kaha te Reo Māori" ("‘Let’s make the Māori language strong")
2023	11–17 September	"Kia Kaha te Reo Māori" ("‘Let’s make the Māori language strong")
2024	14–21 September	"Ake Ake Ake - a forever language"
2025	14–20 September	Te Wiki o te Reo Māori 50th aniversery
2026	14–20 September	"Tāore Reo Māori" ("Te Reo Towns")
