= Te Haumihiata Mason =

New Zealand Māori language translator

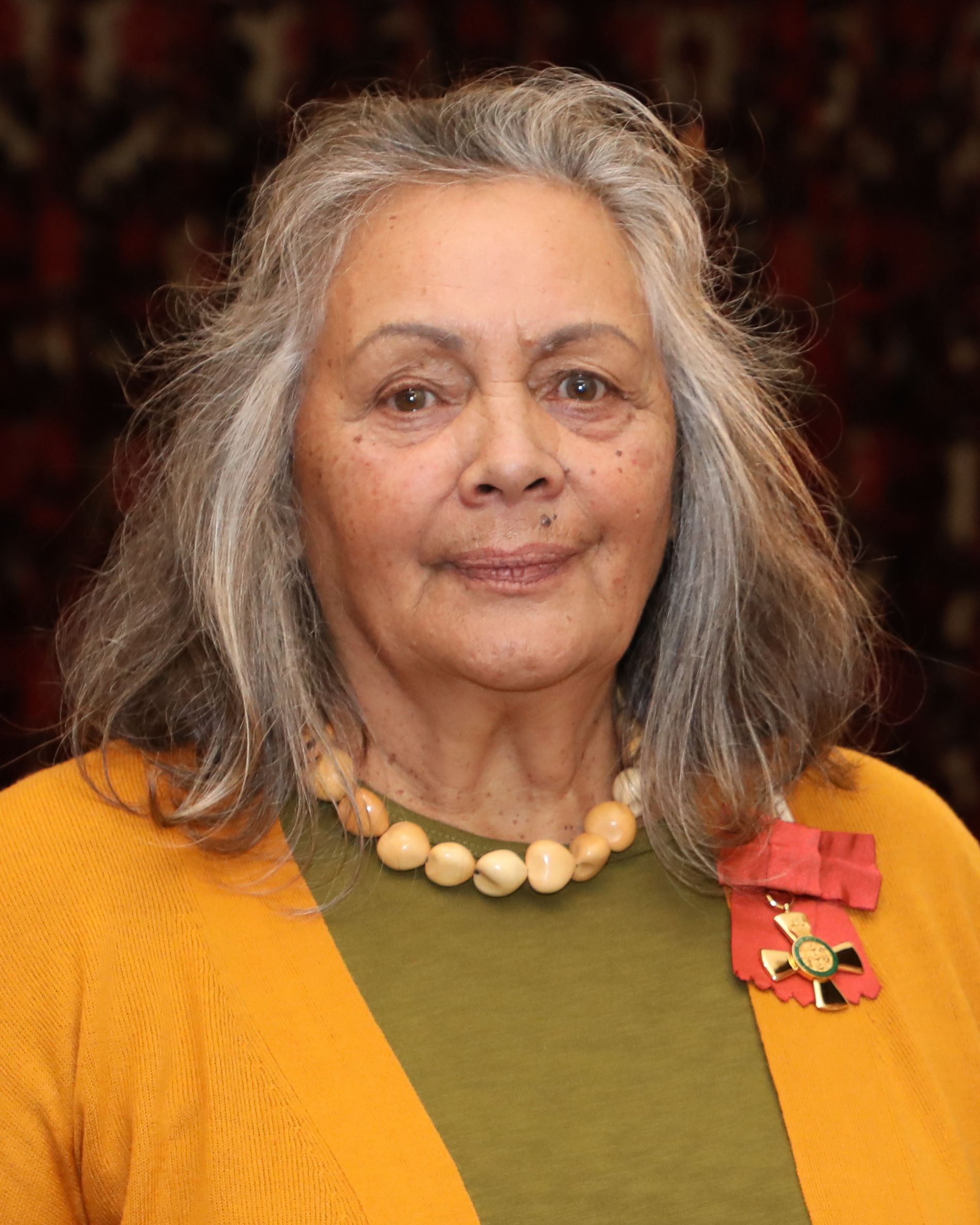
- Born: 1950
- Awards: Officer of the New Zealand Order of Merit

Academic background
- Education: University of Waikato

Academic work
- Institutions: University of Waikato, Māori Language Commission, New Zealand Post Office

Beryl Te Haumihiata Mason ONZM is a New Zealand linguist, translator, lecturer and tutor of the Māori language. In 2023, Mason was appointed an Officer of the New Zealand Order of Merit for services to Māori language education.

== Academic career ==
Mason affiliates to Ngāi Tūhoe, Ngāti Pango, and Te Arawa iwi. She was born and grew up Ruatoki, in an isolated community where only te reo Māori was spoken. She was the third of eight children, and after contracting tuberculosis was sent to be looked after by her grandmother, Pihitahi Trainor. Mason's father moved the family to Whakatāne when she was nine, and she and her siblings had to learn English. Mason left school at the age of 15, and worked delivering telegrams by bicycle in Whakatāne. She later worked for the Post Office in Wellington, and trained as a telegraph operator there. She moved to Tokoroa with her husband and children, still working for the Post Office there.

When she was in her thirties, mentor Timoti Kāretu persuaded Mason to go to university, and she earned a Bachelor of Arts in education and te reo Māori from the University of Waikato. Mason joined the faculty of the university in 1989, where she lectured in the Māori Department until 1995. Mason also worked at the Māori Language Commission periodically.

Mason translated Shakespeare's Troilus and Cressida which was performed at Shakespeare's Globe in London in 2012. Auckland University Press published her translation of Romeo and Juliet in 2023 and her translation of Macbeth in 2025. She translated Anne Frank's Diary of a Young Girl after an audience member at a touring exhibition asked Anne Frank New Zealand chairman Boyd Klap if the book was available in te reo Māori. Klap proceeded to secure the rights and funding to translate the work, and the translation was published in 2019.

Mason was the Māori language consultant on the feature film Muru, about the 2007 police raids on Urewera.

== Honours and awards ==
In the 2023 New Year Honours, Mason was appointed an Officer of the New Zealand Order of Merit for services to Māori language education.

== Selected works ==
- Shakespeare, William (2023). Rōmeo rāua ko Hurieta [Romeo and Juliet]. Kotahi rau pukapuka (in Māori). Translated by Mason, Te Haumihiata. Auckland, New Zealand: Auckland University Press (published 10 August 2023). ISBN 978-1-86940-989-0. OCLC 1393443611.
- Frank, Anne; Klap, Boyd (2019). Pressler, Mirjam (ed.). Te rātaka a tētahi kōhine. Translated by Mason, Te Haumihiata (Te putanga whai mana katoa ed.). Te Whanga-nui-a-Tara: Holocaust Centre of New Zealand = Holocaust Centre o Aotearoa. ISBN 978-0-473-47825-4.
