= Lady Love =

Lady Love may refer to:

- Lady Love (LeToya Luckett album), 2009
- Lady Love (Katri Helena album), 1976
- "Lady Love" (Bina Butta song), a song by Bina Butta featuring Kennyon Brown
- "Lady Love" (Lou Rawls song), a song by Lou Rawls
- "Lady Love", a song by the band Rize, used as the opening theme to the show Shion no Ō
- Lady Love (manga), a manga by Hiromu Ono

== See also ==
- Love Lady, Tennessee, U.S.
