= Waiata =

Waiata is a word in the Māori language meaning "song", and may refer to:

- Māori music
- Waiata (album), a 1981 album by Split Enz
- Waiata / Anthems, a 2019 compilation album by various New Zealand artists.
