= Rob Ruha =

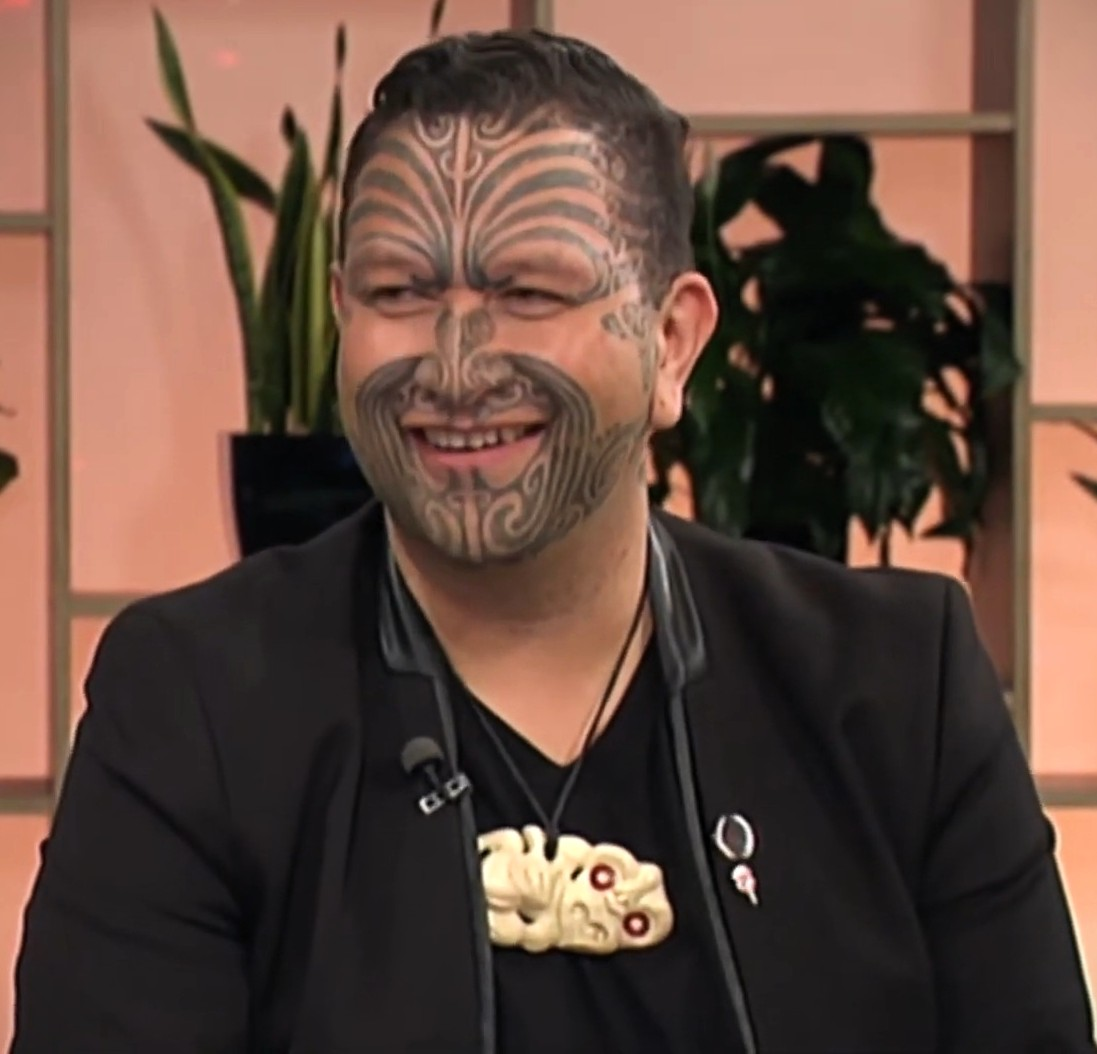
- Ruha in 2018

Background information
- Born: Robert Ruha; 1980 (age 45–46); Wharekahika, Gisborne District
- Genres: Māori music; Pop; Roots reggae; R&B; Soul music
- Occupations: Singer; songwriter; musician; music director
- Instruments: Vocals; bass
- Years active: 2011–present
- Label: InDigiNation Music

Rob Ruha (born 1980), is a New Zealand musician from Wharekahika, Gisborne District. He debuted as a solo musician in 2013, and is known for his singles sung in te Reo Māori, including "Kalega" (2017), "Ka Mānu" (2019), "35" with Ka Hao (2021), and "Taera" (2021). Ruha worked as the music director for the Māori language version of the Walt Disney Pictures films Moana and The Lion King.

== Biography ==
Ruha grew up in Wharekahika, Gisborne District. He is of Te Whānau-ā-Apanui and Ngāti Porou descent, and also has Ngāti Rangiteaorere and Tūhourangi ancestry. He grew up performing kapa haka, and as a teenager, Ruha moved to Porirua, Wellington, and was inspired to become a musician while attending Mana College. Ruha returned to Gisborne to complete high school, and at 17, won the Aotearoa Traditional Māori Performing Arts Festival (Te Matatini) award for Best Waiata Tira as a part of the Waihīrere Māori Club. In the year 2000, Ruha led his first kapa haka group, Tūranga Wahine Tūranga Tāne, who performed at Te Matatini, and by the next year began judging the competition.

In 2004, Ruha moved to Hawaii to manage the Aotearoa section of the Polynesian Cultural Center. In 2007, Ruha graduated with a master's degree in Mātauranga Māori.

One of Ruha's first releases was the song "Hotuhotu", which he recorded with Ria Hall, which became one of the most played songs in te reo Māori on New Zealand radios in 2011. During a 2012 trip to Hawaii to judge a kapa haka competition, Ruha performed as a solo musician for the first time. In 2013, he began working as a solo musician after receiving mentorship and guidance by musician Maisey Rika, releasing his solo debut single "Pōnga Rā" on Waitangi Day 2014. His debut extended play Tiki Tapu was recorded at a home studio in Hamurana on the shores of Lake Rotorua, and produced alongside Michael Barker of Split Enz. His debut album Pūmau followed shortly afterwards in 2015.

In 2016, Ruha worked as a music consultant and performer for the soundtrack of the Lee Tamahori-directed film Mahana, and in 2017 was the musical director for the Te Reo Māori translation of the Walt Disney Pictures film Moana. Ruha's second album Survivance, a soul and R&B collaboration with the Witch Dr., was led by the single "Kalega". The song's title is a Te Tai Rāwhiti Māori slang term meaning "too much".

In January 2020, Ruha produced released a live album of gospel waiata in te Reo, sung supergroup Mōhau. The album won the Te Māngai Pāho Mana Reo Award and the Best Worship Artist Te Kaipuoro Kairangi Toa award at the 2020 Aotearoa Music Awards. In 2021, the Ruha-produced Te Tai Rāwhiti choir Ka Hao released their debut single "35", which became a hit single in New Zealand, gaining popularity on TikTok during Te Wiki o te Reo Māori (Māori Language Week). Later that year, Ruha released his third studio album, entitled Preservation of Scenery. "35" and "Taera", a single from Preservation of Scenery, were two of the top 10 most commercially successful songs sung in Te Reo Māori for 2021.

In 2022, Ruha worked as the co-musical director of The Lion King Reo Māori (2022), alongside Pere Wihongi.

== Personal life ==
Ruha is married to music manager Cilla Ruha, who he met at high school. Together they have four children. His entire family speaks te reo Māori as their first language. He lives at Te Kaha in the Bay of Plenty.

Ruha practices raranga (traditional weaving) and painting, which he learnt from his grandmothers at the age of seven.

== Discography ==
=== Studio albums ===
| Title | Album details | Peak chart positions | |
| Title | Album details | NZ | NZ Artist |
|---|---|---|---|
| Pūmau | Released: 22 December 2015; Label: Rob Ruha; Format: Digital download, streaming | — | 17 |
| Survivance (Rob Ruha and the Witch Dr.) | Released: 1 December 2017; Label: Rob Ruha; Format: Digital download, streaming | — | 10 |
| Preservation of Scenery | Released: 8 October 2021; Label: InDigiNation Music; Format: Digital download, streaming | 39 | 12 |
"—" denotes a recording that did not chart.

=== Extended plays ===
| Title | Album details | Peak chart positions |
| Title | Album details | NZ Artist |
|---|---|---|
| Tiki Tapu | Released: 28 March 2014; Label: Rob Ruha; Format: Digital download, streaming | `5 |

=== Singles ===
==== As lead artist ====
| Title | Year | Peak chart positions | | Album |
| Title | Year | NZ Hot | NZ Artist | Album |
|---|---|---|---|---|
| "Hotuhotu" (Robert Ruha & Ria Hall) | 2011 | — | — | Mīharo: He Kohikohinga Waiata Māori |
| "Pōnga Rā" | 2014 | — | 12 | Tiki Tapu |
| "Tiki Tapu" | 2014 | — | 8 | Tiki Tapu |
| "Waiaroha" (featuring Maisey Rika) | 2015 | — | 15 | Pūmau |
| "Kariri" (featuring Tiki Taane) | 2016 | — | — | Pūmau |
| "Kalega" (Rob Ruha and the Witch Dr.) | 2017 | — | — | Survivance |
| "Taka Rawa" (featuring Ka Hao) | 2021 | — | — (Note: "Taka Rawa" did not enter the New Zealand artists top 20 chart, but peaked at number 7 on the Hot 20 NZ Artists Singles Chart.) | Preservation of Scenery |
| "Taera" | 2021 | 11 | — (Note: "Taera" did not enter the New Zealand artists top 20 chart, but peaked at number 2 on the Hot 20 NZ Artists Singles Chart.) | Preservation of Scenery |
| "That's Where I'll Be" | 2022 | 4 | 19 | Preservation of Scenery |
| "Ka Taria" (with Drax Project) | 2022 | 17 | 20 | Non-album singles |
| "Matariki Hunga Nui (Calling Me Home)" (with Troy Kingi and Kaylee Bell) | 2025 | 21 | — | Non-album singles |
"—" denotes a recording that did not chart.

==== As featured artist ====
| Title | Year | Peak chart positions | | Certifications | Album |
| Title | Year | NZ | NZ Artist | Certifications | Album |
|---|---|---|---|---|---|
| "Te Matatini Ki Te Ao" (among National Kapa Haka Festival 2019) | 2018 | — (Note: "Te Matatini Ki Te Ao" did not enter the New Zealand top 40 chart, but peaked at number 31 on the Hot 40 Singles Chart.) | — (Note: "Te Matatini Ki Te Ao" did not enter the New Zealand artists top 20 chart, but peaked at number 8 on the Hot 20 NZ Artists Singles Chart.) | | Non-album singles |
| "Ka Mānu" (Bella Kalolo, Maisey Rika, Majic Pāora, Ria Hall, Rob Ruha, Seth Haapu, Troy Kingi, The Witch Dr.) | 2019 | — (Note: "Ka Mānu" did not enter the New Zealand top 40 chart, but peaked at number 20 on the Hot 40 Singles Chart.) | 20 | | Non-album singles |
| "Stay" (among Tūtahi) | 2020 | — (Note: "Stay" did not enter the NZ Top 40 Singles Chart, but peaked at number 10 on the NZ Hot Singles Chart.) | 16 | | Non-album singles |
| "35" (Ka Hao featuring Rob Ruha) | 2021 | 12 | 1 | RMNZ: Platinum | Ka Hao: One Tira, One Voice |
"—" denotes a recording that did not chart.
