= Maori Language Act 1987 =

New Zealand Act of Parliament

Māori Language Act 1987

New Zealand Parliament
- Long title: An Act to declare the Māori language to be an official language of New Zealand, to confer the right to speak Māori in certain legal proceedings, and to establish Te Taura Whiri I Te Reo Māori and define its functions and powers.
- Royal assent: 20 July 1987
- Commenced: 1 August 1987; s 4: 1 February 1988

Legislative history
- Passed: 1987

Amended by
- Maori Language Amendment Act 1991

Repealed by
- Māori Language Act 2016

Related legislation
- Treaty of Waitangi Act 1975; New Zealand Sign Language Act
- Status: Repealed

The Māori Language Act 1987 (Māori: Te Ture mō te Reo Māori 1987) was a statute of the New Zealand Parliament that gave official language status to the Māori language (te reo Māori), and gave speakers a right to use it in legal settings such as courts. It also established the Māori Language Commission, initially called Te Komihana Mo Te Reo Maori, to promote the language and provide advice on it. The law was enacted as the Maori Language Act 1987 and written without macrons, which were added in reprints following the Legislation Act 2012. The 1987 act was repealed and replaced by Māori Language Act 2016.

== Context ==
The act came after years of campaigning by Māori, particularly those in the Māori protest movement. It also came after shifts in thinking about the Treaty of Waitangi. By the mid-1980s, the treaty had acquired increased relevance thanks primarily to the Waitangi Tribunal. The act was passed at least in part as a response to the tribunal finding that the Māori language was a taonga (treasure or valued possession) under the treaty. The act also drew on international precedents, primarily the Bord na Gaeilge Act 1978 of Ireland, which is cited several times in the legislation, and also the Welsh Language Act 1967 of the United Kingdom, which enabled the use of the Welsh language in Welsh court proceedings.

Despite the act, Māori does not have the same status under law as English. For example, tax records must be kept in English unless the Commissioner of Internal Revenue agrees otherwise.

== Amendment and reprint ==
The Maori Language Amendment Act 1991 changed the name of the Māori Language Commission to Te Taura Whiri I Te Reo Māori. It also slightly expanded the range of legal settings in which Māori could be used, to include bodies such as the Tenancy Tribunal and any Commission of Inquiry.

The law had been enacted as the Maori Language Act 1987 and written without macrons. After the Legislation Act 2012 authorised the Chief Parliamentary Counsel to rewrite Māori words using up-to-date orthographic conventions when reprinting legislation, macrons were added in reprints of this act.

== Repeal by 2016 act ==
The 1987 act was repealed and replaced by Māori Language Act 2016 (Te Ture mō Te Reo Māori 2016), an act "intended as a major step forward in legislation promoting the language", according to a paper by the Parliamentary Library. It created a new body, Te Mātāwai, to act on behalf of Māori for the protection, promotion and revitalisation of the Māori language. As a first for New Zealand, two official versions of the act were enacted, one in Māori and the other in English, with section 12 stating that if there should arise any conflict over meaning or interpretation between the two versions, the Māori version should prevail.

== Bibliography ==
- Stephens, Māmari (2011). "Taonga, Rights and Interests: Some Observations on WAI 262 and the Framework of Protections for the Māori Language". Victoria University of Wellington Law Review. 42 (2): 241–258. doi:10.26686/vuwlr.v42i2.5135.
