= Tīmoti Kāretu =

New Zealand Māori-language scholar (born 1937)

Sir Tīmoti Kāretu KNZM QSO CRSNZ
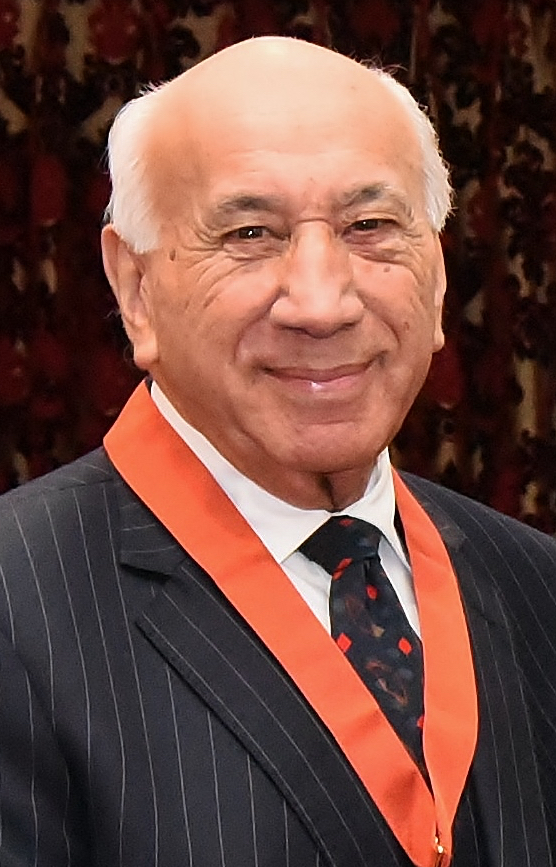
- Kāretu in 2017
- Born: Tīmoti Samuel Kāretu; 29 April 1937 (age 89); Hastings, New Zealand

Academic work
- Discipline: Māori language and performing arts
- Institutions: University of Waikato

Sir Tīmoti Samuel Kāretu KNZM QSO CRSNZ (born 29 April 1937) is a New Zealand academic of Māori language and performing arts. He served as the inaugural head of the Department of Māori at the University of Waikato, and rose to the rank of professor. He was the first Māori language commissioner, between 1987 and 1999, and then was executive director of Te Kohanga Reo National Trust from 1993 until 2003. In 2003, he was closely involved in the foundation of Te Panekiretanga o te Reo, the Institute of Excellence in Māori Language, and served as its executive director. He is fluent in Māori, English, French and German.

== Early life and career ==
Kāretu was born in Hastings. He was adopted at the age of two months in a whāngai adoption by his great uncle Tame Kāretu and Mauwhare Taiwera. His biological mother gave birth to him when she was 17, and died of tuberculosis at the age of 22. He was raised at Waikaremoana, Waimārama and Ruatāhuna, and affiliates to Ngāi Tūhoe and Ngāti Kahungunu. His biological father was Ngāti Pāhauwera, and they had minimal contact.

As a student, Kāretu won a scholarship to Wellington College, where he boarded, and learnt French and German. After leaving school, he moved to Taumarunui, and taught French and German at Taumaranui High School as well as Māori-language night classes for lawyers. In 1961, he moved to London to work for the New Zealand High Commission, where he served as the chief information officer, and made frequent trips to Brussels to work as a German and French interpreter.

Kāretu forged many inter-iwi connections in London, and helped found the cultural group Ngāti Rānana with Louie Tāwhai from Te Arawa, Winnie Waapu from Ngāti Kahungunu, Margaret Smith from Ngāpuhi, Margaret Paiki from Aotea, Ben Wanoa from Ngāti Porou and Norma Mōrehu from Ngāti Raukawa. He returned to New Zealand in 1969 and taught secondary-school French and German once again—this time at Fairfield College in Hamilton—before taking up academic work in 1972 at the University of Waikato.

In 1987, Kāretu was appointed as the inaugural commissioner for the newly-established Te Taura Whiri i te Reo Māori alongside Tā Kingi Matutaera Īhaka, Koro Wetere, Kāterina Te Heikōkō Mataira, Ānita Moke and Ray Harlow.

In 2004, Kāretu, along with Te Wharehuia Milroy and Pou Temara established Te Panekiretanga o Te Reo Māori- The Institute of Excellence in the Māori Language. This ran until 2019.

== Honours ==
In the 1993 New Year Honours, Kāretu was appointed a Companion of the Queen's Service Order for public services, and in the 2017 Queen's Birthday Honours he was named a Knight Companion of the New Zealand Order of Merit for services to the Māori language. He has been conferred honorary doctorates by Victoria University of Wellington in 2003, and the University of Waikato in 2008. In 2020 he was honoured with the Prime Minister's Award for Literary Achievement in the non-fiction category and was elected a Companion of Royal Society Te Apārangi.

Kāretu won the 2021 Te Mūrau o te Tuhi Māori Language Award at the Ockham New Zealand Book Awards. He had been joint winner of the same award two years earlier.

== Songwriting ==
In 2019, Kāretu translated nine songs from English to Māori language for the album, Waiata / Anthems, which peaked at number 1 on the New Zealand album charts in September 2019. In 2021, Kāretu helped write the Six60 song "Pepeha", and translated "Hua Pirau / Fallen Fruit" New Zealand singer-songwriter Lorde for her Te Reo Māori extended play Te Ao Mārama.
