= Ka Mānu =

2019 protest single by Rob Ruha

Single by Bella Kalolo, Maisey Rika, Majic Pāora, Ria Hall, Rob Ruha, Seth Haapu, Troy Kingi, The Witch Dr.
- Language: Māori
- Released: 16 August 2019
- Recorded: 11 August 2019
- Studio: Parachute Studios, Auckland
- Genre: reggae
- Length: 4:50
- Songwriter: Robert Ruha
- Producer: Robert Ruha

Maisey Rika singles chronology
"Get Up, Stand Up" (2016)	"Ka Mānu" (2019)	"East Coast Moon" (2020)

Ria Hall singles chronology
"Te Ahi Kai Pō" (2017)	"Ka Mānu" (2019)	"Cause & Effect" (2019)

Rob Ruha singles chronology
"Te Matatini Ki Te Ao" (2018)	"Ka Mānu" (2019)	"Stay" (2020)

Troy Kingi singles chronology
"Babylon Grows" (2019)	"Ka Mānu" (2019)	"Stay" (2020)

Music video
- "Ka Mānu" on YouTube

"Ka Mānu" (English: "Afloat") is a Māori language song, released in 2019 to protest the Ihumātao housing development. Written by musician Rob Ruha, it was released as a collaboration between Ruha and a number of New Zealand musicians, Bella Kalolo, Maisey Rika, Majic Pāora, Ria Hall, Seth Haapu, Troy Kingi and The Witch Dr.

== Background and composition ==
Since 2016, protest group SOUL had been occupying land at Ihumātao in Māngere, South Auckland, after Fletcher Building acquired the historical site in order to develop a housing project. On 3 July 2019, SOUL were served an eviction notice, and five people were arrested. On 4 August 2019, SOUL protestors and supporters held a hīkoi to protest this action, and on 5 August a number of protests were held nationally, including at the Fletcher headquarters in Penrose.

Ruha was overseas in Japan during the early August protests, and was inspired to write a support song for movement after noticing how much of a national response the protests received. A reggae song sung in G major, Ruha and his wife Cilla began organising the project in early August, and recorded the song on 11 August 2019 at Parachute Studios in central Auckland. The song was released soon after on 16 August 2019.

Ruha was inspiration behind "Ka Mānu" was the story of Jesus walking on water in Matthew 14. Ruha intended for the song to express unity and peaceful resistance, and highlight the common issues indigenous people face globally.

== Reception ==
At the 2020 Waiata Māori Music Awards, "Ka Mānu" won the award for most successful single sung in Te Reo on New Zealand radio, and the Maioha Award at the 2020 APRA Silver Scroll Awards.

== Credits and personnel ==
Credits adapted from Tidal and YouTube.

- Leo Coghini – keyboards
- Thabani Gapara – alto saxophone
- Seth Haapu – vocals
- Ria Hall – vocals
- Marika Hodgson – Bass
- Horomona Horo – taonga pūoro
- James Illingworth – piano, hammond
- Bella Kalolo – vocals
- Tyna Keelan – guitar
- Troy Kingi – vocals
- Jake Krishnamurti – Trumpet
- Darren Mathiassen – drums
- Majic Pāora – vocals
- Maisey Rika – vocals
- Rob Ruha – vocals, producer, composer
- The Witch Dr. – vocals

== Charts ==
Chart (2019)	Peak position
New Zealand Artist Singles (Recorded Music NZ)	20
New Zealand Hot Singles (Recorded Music NZ)	20
New Zealand Artist Hot Singles (Recorded Music NZ)	2
