= 35 (song) =

2021 single by Ka Hao

Single by Ka Hao featuring Rob Ruha

from the album Ka Hao: One Tira, One Voice
- Released: 3 September 2021
- Genre: Pop
- Length: 3:20
- Label: InDigiNation Music
- Songwriters: Te Amorutu Broughton; Kaea Hills; Dan Martin; Whenua Patuwai; Rob Ruha; Ainsley Tai
- Producer: Dan Martin

Ka Hao featuring Rob Ruha singles chronology
"35" (2021)	"Taka Rawa" (2021)

Music video
- "35" on YouTube

"35" is a song by New Zealand youth choir Ka Hao featuring musician Rob Ruha. "35" was the group's first single, and preceded the release of their debut album Ka Hao: One Tira, One Voice. The song, performed primarily in Māori, was a sleeper hit, first entering the New Zealand Singles Chart in Te Wiki o te Reo Māori in September 2021 and peaking at number 12 in November. "35", alongside New Zealand band Six60's song "Pepeha" (also released in 2021), are the best performing songs sung in Māori since Stan Walker's "Aotearoa" (2014).

== Background and composition ==
The Ka Hao youth choir formed in 2019, performing concerts for the Tairāwhiti Arts Festival, and in 2020 took part in Mōhau, an album of gospel songs sung in Māori which won the Mana Reo Award at the 2020 Aotearoa Music Awards. "35" was the group's debut single.

The title "35" is a reference to State Highway 35, the road that connects the coastal towns of Te Tairāwhiti, connecting the eastern Bay of Plenty to Gisborne. The song was inspired by Rob Ruha's single "Kalega". The group wanted to write an anthem similar to "Kalega", but to represent all of the communities along the east coast.

The song's music video was produced by Abe Mora, and was released on 3 September, coinciding with the single's release. The video features the members of the choir and Rob Ruha wearing sport hoodies that show the state highway's logo, while they watch videos of their own adventures on the east coast of New Zealand.

== Chart performance and popularity ==
The song was released to coincide with Te Wiki o te Reo Māori, and was one of the 27 songs produced for the 2021 Waiata Anthems Week, a project to promote popular music sung in Māori. The song first gained popularity during the week when it was used for a popular dance on TikTok. The song became internationally popular in November 2021, particularly among African American and indigenous communities.

The song entered the New Zealand Singles Chart in September 2021, peaking two months later in November 2021. Between September 2021 and March 2022, the song spent 25 weeks in the top 40. It became the second best performing song of 2021 sung in Te Reo, behind Six60's song "Pepeha". The song was certified gold in New Zealand in November 2021, and platinum by January 2022. Alongside "Pepeha" (which also received a platinum certification), these were the first songs sung in Te Reo to receive a certification since "Kia Mau Ki Tō Ūkaipō", the Māori language version of Six60's "Don't Forget Your Roots" in 2020, and Stan Walker's "Aotearoa" in 2015.

== Critical reception ==
The song won the grand prize at the 2022 APRA Awards. The song was performed during the awards ceremony by Stan Walker and Hamo Dell.

== Credits and personnel ==
Credits adapted from Tidal.

- Te Amorutu Broughton – lyricist, composer
- Kaea Hills – lyricist, composer
- Dan Martin – producer, lyricist, composer
- Whenua Patuwai – lyricist, composer
- Rob Ruha – lyricist, composer
- Ainsley Tai – lyricist, composer

== Charts ==
Chart (2021)	Peak position
New Zealand (Recorded Music NZ)	12
New Zealand Artist Singles (Recorded Music NZ)	1
New Zealand Te Reo Māori Singles (Recorded Music NZ)	1

=== Year-end charts ===
Chart (2021)	Position
New Zealand Te Reo Māori (Recorded Music NZ)	2

== Certifications ==
Certifications and sales for "35"
Region	Certification	Certified units/sales
New Zealand (RMNZ)	Platinum	30,000^{‡}
^{‡} Sales+streaming figures based on certification alone.

== See also ==
- Te Wiki o te Reo Māori
- List of number-one Te Reo Māori singles from the 2020s
