= Lady Love (Bina Butta song) =

2021 single by Bina Butta

Single by Bina Butta featuring Kennyon Brown
- Released: 17 September 2021
- Genre: Reggae, pop
- Length: 4:34
- Label: FutureNow Music
- Songwriters: Kennyon T J Howard Niu Brown; Jamie Muscat; Faasalafa Zion Tootoo Opapo; Sinautoketi Robina Yoledley Revalleena Siale Fainga'a
- Producer: Kennyon Brown

Bina Butta singles chronology
| "Woman" (2020) | "Lady Love" (2021) | "One Call Away" (2022) |

Kennyon Brown singles chronology
| "Beretta" (2021) | "Lady Love" (2021) | "Essence" (2021) |

Music video
- "Lady Love" on YouTube

"Lady Love" is a song by Samoan Australian musician Bina Butta. A collaboration with her brother, New Zealand-American musician Kennyon Brown, the song was released as a single in September 2021. The song became a viral hit on TikTok, and was a commercial success in New Zealand, receiving a platinum certification and was one of the top 20 songs by New Zealand artists for 2022.

== Background and composition ==
The song was written together by Bina Butta and her brother Kennyon Brown at the start of the COVID-19 lockdowns in Australia. It was inspired by Bina Butta becoming a mother, and the feeling of welcoming a baby into the family. Brown also acted as the song's producer.

== Release and promotion ==
"Lady Love" was first released as a single on 17 September 2021, which was followed on 29 October with a remixed version, created by label-mate DJ Noiz. A music video for the song was released on 3 December 2021.

The song became viral on TikTok, and saw success in Australia, the Pacific and the United States. The song began charting in New Zealand in late October, and by March had become certified gold. The song charted for most of 2022, and became the 16th best performing song by a New Zealand artists in 2022. By February 2022, the song was certified platinum.

== Critical reception ==
At the 2022 Pacific Music Awards, Bina Butta and her brother were nominated for the Niu FM Best International Pacific Artist award, losing to Australian Samoan singer Lisi.

== Credits and personnel ==
Credits adapted from Tidal.

- Kennyon T J Howard Niu Brown – songwriter
- Jamie Muscat – songwriter
- Faasalafa Zion Tootoo Opapo – songwriter
- Sinautoketi Robina Yoledley Revalleena Siale Fainga'a – songwriter

== Charts ==
=== Weekly charts ===
| Chart (2021) | Peak position |
|---|---|
| New Zealand Hot Singles (Recorded Music NZ) | 14 |
| New Zealand Artist Singles (Recorded Music NZ) | 11 |

=== Year-end charts ===
| Chart (2022) | Position |
|---|---|
| New Zealand Artist Charts (Recorded Music NZ) | 16 |

== Certifications ==
Certifications and sales for "Lady Love"
| Region | Certification | Certified units/sales |
|---|---|---|
| New Zealand (RMNZ) | Platinum | 30,000^{‡} |
^{‡} Sales+streaming figures based on certification alone.
