= Te Tai Rāwhiti Māori =

Languages
- Māori language

Te Tai Rāwhiti Māori are a group of Māori iwi at or around the east coast Gisborne District of the North Island of New Zealand. It includes the iwi (tribe) of Ngāti Porou, Aitanga a Hauiti Iwi and Ngati Uepohatu. It also includes the iwi of Ngāriki Kaiputahi, Te Aitanga ā Māhaki, Rongowhakaata and Ngāi Tāmanuhiri.
