= Bina Butta =

- Born: Robina Brown-Fainga'a
- Genres: R&B; pop; reggae
- Occupation: Singer
- Instrument: Vocals
- Years active: 2019–present
- Label: FutureNow Music

Robina Brown-Fainga'a, known as Bina Butta /ˈbinə ˈbʌtə/ BEE-nə BUT-tər, is a Samoan-Filipino musician from Australia. She released the song "Lady Love" in 2021, which became a hit song in New Zealand after going viral on TikTok.

== Biography ==
Bina Butta grew up in Western Sydney, Australia, as the youngest of three. She comes from a Samoan-Filipino family, whose ancestral village is Lotopa in Samoa. Her two brothers were born in Auckland, New Zealand. Her family moved to the United States when she was young, and returned to Australia when she was 12. Bina Butta's brothers, Rellek Brown and Kennyon Brown, also work in the music industry.

Bina Butta released her first song in 2017, "Bae", a collaboration with her brother Kennyon Brown and Donell Lewis on the album Legooo, and released her debut solo single "Akiliz" in 2019.

In 2021, Bina Butta released the single "Lady Love", which she wrote and performed with her brother Kennyon Brown at the start of the COVID-19 lockdowns in Australia. The song was inspired by Bina Butta becoming a mother, and the feeling of welcoming a baby into the family. The song became viral on TikTok, and saw success in Australia, the Pacific and the United States. The song was a hit in New Zealand, becoming platinum certified in 2022.

At the 2022 Pacific Music Awards, Bina Butta and her brother were nominated for the Niu FM Best International Pacific Artist award.

== Personal life ==
Bina Butta has two children with her Tongan New Zealand husband.

== Discography ==
=== Singles ===
==== As lead artist ====
| Title | Year | Peak chart positions | Certifications | Album |
| Title | Year | NZ Artist | Certifications | Album |
|---|---|---|---|---|
| "Akiliz" | 2019 | — | | Non-album singles |
| "Blessing" | 2020 | — | | Non-album singles |
| "Woman" (featuring Stndrd) | 2020 | — (Note: "Woman" did not enter the New Zealand artists top 20 chart, but peaked at number 8 on the New Zealand artists Hot 20 Singles Chart.) | | Non-album singles |
| "Lady Love" (featuring Kennyon Brown) | 2021 | 11 | RMNZ: Platinum | Non-album singles |
| "One Call Away" | 2022 | — | | Non-album singles |
| "Love Myself" | 2023 | — | | Non-album singles |
| "Speechless" (DJ Noiz, Bina Butta and Donell Lewis) | 2023 | — (Note: "Speechless" did not enter the New Zealand artists top 20 chart, but peaked at number 4 on the New Zealand artists Hot 20 Singles Chart.) | | Non-album singles |
"—" denotes a recording that did not chart.

==== As featured artist ====
| Title | Year | Album |
|---|---|---|
| "Heart and Hand" (Rellek Brown featuring Bina Butta) | 2019 | Non-album single |

=== Guest appearances ===
| Title | Year | Other artists | Album |
|---|---|---|---|
| "Bae" | 2017 | Donell Lewis, Kennyon Brown | Legooo |
