= Aotearoa (Stan Walker song) =

2014 single by Stan Walker featuring Ria Hall, Troy Kingi, and Maisey Rika

Single by Stan Walker featuring Ria Hall, Troy Kingi and Maisey Rika
- Released: 21 July 2014
- Length: 3:37
- Label: Sony
- Songwriters: Vince Harder; Troy Kingi; Stan Walker
- Producer: Vince Harder

Stan Walker singles chronology
"Holding You" (2014)	"Aotearoa" (2014)	"Start Again" (2015)

"Aotearoa" is a song by New Zealand recording artist Stan Walker featuring Ria Hall, Troy Kingi and Maisey Rika. It was released as a single through Sony Music Australia on 21 July 2014. "Aotearoa" peaked at number two on the New Zealand Singles Chart.

An English version of the song was recorded and released on Walker's 2019 EP, Faith Hope Love.

== Background ==
To celebrate te Wiki o te Reo Māori (Māori Language Week), Walker decided to release his first song completely in Māori, alongside other Kiwi artists Ria Hall, Troy Kingi and Maisey Rika. Inspired by the 1984 song "Poi E" by the Patea Māori Club, (which as of 2014 is the only Māori language song to reach number one on the New Zealand Singles Chart), Walker, Hall, Kingi and Rika took on the challenge to get another Maori song to number one in New Zealand. Of this initiative Walker says, "we all have to connect ourselves back to the mainland where we are all from. I have never been more proud to be Māori. It doesn't matter who you are or where you've come from, to live in New Zealand, you are us and we are you. We are one!" Hall calls the result "a song to celebrate our nation, our landscape, our uniqueness, our language and our people". A portion of the proceeds from "Aotearoa" went towards the Raukatauri Music Therapy Centre.

== Video ==
A video was filmed with the artists in various locations around New Zealand, including Taupo and Whangarei. The director was Alice Orr.

== Live performances ==
On 21 July 2014, "Aotearoa" was performed live on Breakfast. On 23 July 2014, the song was performed live on The Edge.

== Track listing ==
- Digital download
1. "Aotearoa" – 3:13

== Chart performance ==
"Aotearoa" entered the New Zealand Singles Chart at number two on 28 July 2014; the following week, it fell to number seven.

=== Weekly charts ===
Chart (2014)	Peak position
New Zealand (Recorded Music NZ)	2

=== Year-end charts ===
Chart (2014)	Position
New Zealand Artist Top 50 Singles	14

== Certifications ==
Certifications for "Aotearoa"
Region	Certification	Certified units/sales
New Zealand (RMNZ)	4× Platinum	120,000^{‡}
^{‡} Sales+streaming figures based on certification alone.

== Release history ==
Country	Date	Format	Label
New Zealand	21 July 2014	Digital download	Sony Music Australia
