= Pepeha (song) =

2021 single by Six60

Single by Six60
- Released: 27 August 2021
- Genre: Pop
- Length: 3:10
- Label: Epic, Massive
- Songwriters: Mahuia Bridgman-Cooper; Marlon Gerbes; Tīmoti Kāretu; Jeremy Tātere MacLeod; Matiu Walters
- Producers: Marlon Gerbes; Matiu Walters

Six60 singles chronology
"All She Wrote" (2021)	"Pepeha" (2021)	"Before You Leave" (2022)

Music video
- "Pepeha" on YouTube

"Pepeha" is a song by New Zealand band Six60, performed bilingually in English and Māori. "Pepeha" is the band's second song to be recorded in Te Reo Māori, and was released as a single in 2021 to coincide with Te Wiki o te Reo Māori. The song was written by Six60 band members Marlon Gerbes and Matiu Walters, alongside Te Reo experts Mahuia Bridgman-Cooper (a member of the Black Quartet), Jeremy Tātere MacLeod and Sir Tīmoti Kāretu.

== Background and composition ==
In 2019, the band collaborated with musician and project coordinator Hinewehi Mohi for the album Waiata / Anthems, a project for Te Wiki o te Reo Māori which reimagined popular New Zealand songs in Māori language. Six60 performed "Kia Mau Ki Tō Ūkaipō", a reimagining of their version of their 2011 single "Don't Forget Your Roots". The album was widely successful, certified platinum by Recorded Music NZ, and in the album's first week, "Kia Mau Ki Tō Ūkaipō / Don't Forget Your Roots" reached number 10 on the New Zealand singles chart - the highest-charting song from the album.

Two years later, Six60 decided to collaborate with Mohi a second time for an original song, to be released during Te Wiki o te Reo Māori 2021. Lead singer Matiu Walters is Māori (Te Rarawa, Te Aupōuri and Ngāpuhi), however did not grow up speaking the language. The band wrote the song at Mohi's house.

The word pepeha references a form of self-introduction, where the speaker describes their ancestry and connections to the natural environment (such as which waka their ancestors arrived on, and what mountains, rivers and marae are important to them and their family roots). Walters wanted to create a pepeha that would apply to all New Zealanders. Musician Reti Hedley performs taonga pūoro, or Māori traditional instruments on the song.

== Live performances ==
The band first performed the song live as a part of a TikTok livestream on 19 September 2021, as the band was in Los Angeles at the time of the song's release.

== Credits and personnel ==
Credits adapted from Tidal.

- Mahuia Bridgman-Cooper – songwriting
- Ji Fraser – guitar
- Vivek Gabriel – mastering
- Marlon Gerbes – producer, songwriting
- Reti Hedley – taonga pūoro
- Tīmoti Kāretu – songwriting
- Chris Mac – bass
- Jeremy Tātere MacLeod – songwriting
- Nic Manders – engineering, mixing
- Hinewehi Mohi – background vocals
- Eli Paewai – drums
- Matiu Walters – producer, songwriting, vocals, guitar

== Charts ==
Chart (2021)	Peak position
New Zealand (Recorded Music NZ)	2
New Zealand Artist Singles (Recorded Music NZ)	1
New Zealand Te Reo Māori Singles (Recorded Music NZ)	1

=== Year-end charts ===
Chart (2021)	Position
New Zealand Artists (Recorded Music NZ)	18
New Zealand Te Reo Māori (Recorded Music NZ)	1

== Certifications ==
Certifications for "Pepeha"
Region	Certification	Certified units/sales
New Zealand (RMNZ)	4× Platinum	120,000^{‡}
^{‡} Sales+streaming figures based on certification alone.

== See also ==
- Te Wiki o te Reo Māori
- List of number-one Te Reo Māori singles from the 2020s
