= Troy Kingi =

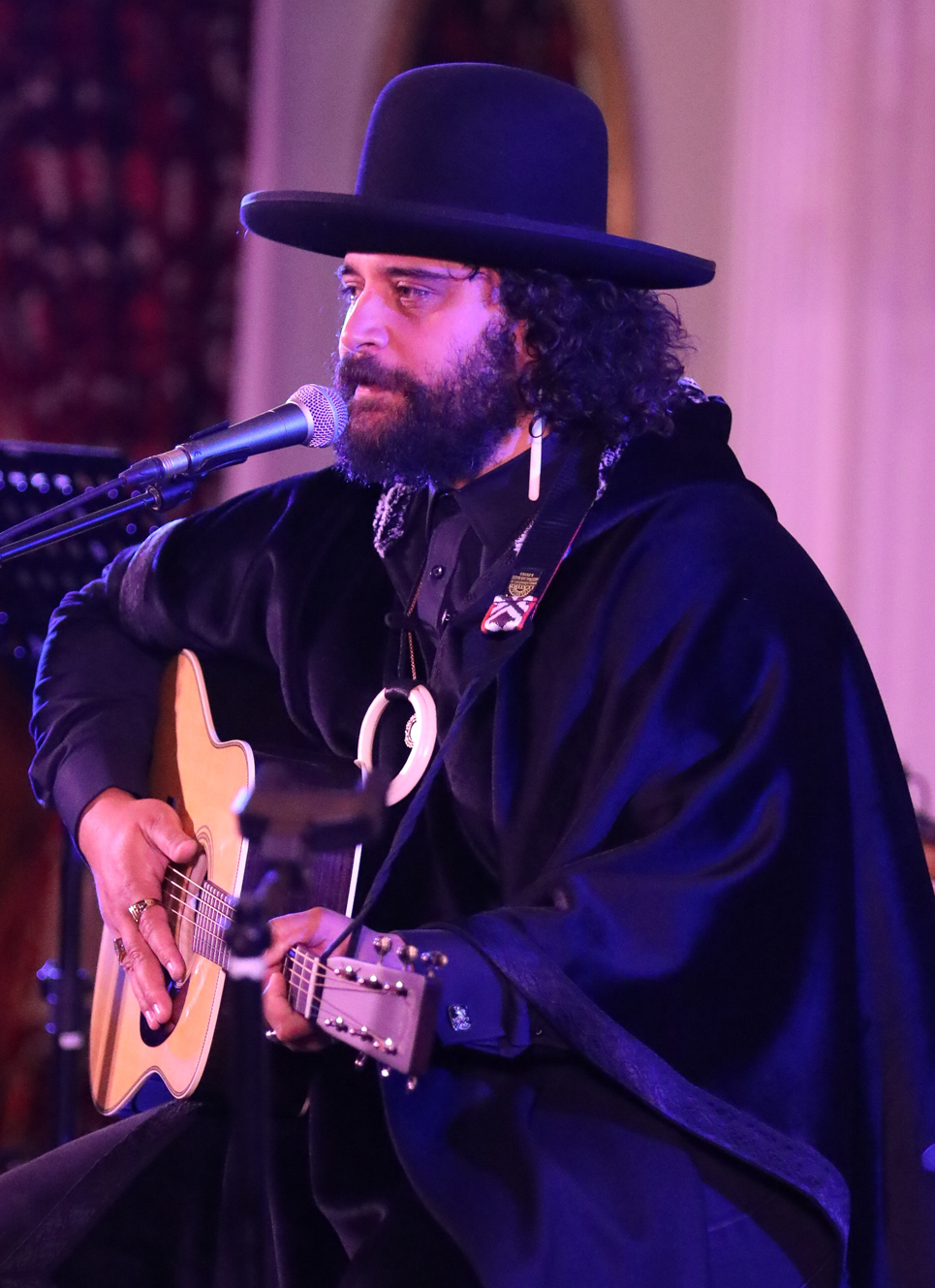
- Kingi at Government House, Wellington in 2021

Background information
- Born: 1984 (age 41–42); Rotorua, New Zealand
- Genres: Funk; Psychedelic rock; Psychedelic funk; Blues; Soul; roots reggae
- Occupations: Singer; songwriter
- Instruments: Vocals; bass; keyboards; drums
- Years active: 2013–present
- Labels: AllGood Absolute Alternative Records, Lyttelton Records, Hongi Slicker Records

Troy Kingi (born 1984) is a New Zealand musician from Northland.

== Biography ==
Troy Kingi was born 1 June 1984 in Rotorua, and was raised in Rotorua, Te Kaha and Kerikeri. Kingi is of Te Arawa, Ngāpuhi and Te Whānau-ā-Apanui descent. He began learning guitar at Te Aute College in Hawke's Bay, and formed his first band, Toll House, at Kerikeri High School. Toll House entered the Smokefreerockquest, winning the regional Northland competition.

Since the early 2000s, Kingi has lived in Kerikeri. He studied at the Music and Audio Institute of New Zealand in Auckland, and on returning to Kerikeri fronted a number of short-lived bands, including Mongolian Deathworm, Kingkachoo, Troy Kingi and the Tigers, Full Moon Street and Typhoon Fools, while also working as a scuba instructor and fruit picking in Kerikeri orchards. Kingi's work with Typhoon Fools gained him more widespread attention, and led to him being cast in the film Mt. Zion (2013). Kingi also featured on the film's soundtrack, and after the film's release, toured New Zealand with the film's lead actor Stan Walker. Kingi released his first extended play in 2013. His appearance in Mt. Zion led to further work as an actor, including The Pā Boys (2014) and Hunt for the Wilderpeople (2016). Kingi collaborated on the Stan Walker song "Aotearoa" (2014), a song created part of a Te Wiki o te Reo Māori project for a song sung in Māori language to reach number one in New Zealand, something that had not been seen since Pātea Māori Club's "Poi E" in 1984.

Kingi set himself the goal of releasing 10 albums in the span of 10 years, performing in 10 different genres. The first in this series was Guitar Party at Uncle's Bach (2016), a double album recorded live in seven days at Lyttelton, New Zealand. At the Waiata Māori Music Awards, Kingi won the awards for best Māori pop artist and best solo male artist. His second album, the soul-psychedelic Shake That Skinny Ass All the Way to Zygertron (2017), featured "Aztechknowledgey", which was nominated for the APRA Silver Scroll award. Holy Colony Burning Acres (2019) was a political roots reggae album featuring songs that discussed subjects including West Papua, the Inuit, Hawaiʻi and Aboriginal Tasmanians, The album won the 2020 Taite Music Prize.

In 2020, Kingi released The Ghost of Freddie Cesar, an album inspired by a cassette tape Kingi found in the belongings of his father, who disappeared in 2005. The cassette tape since went missing, and the album was a re-creation of what Kingi remembered of the tape, blended with his own interpretations and original content. The album was a commercial success, reaching number two on the New Zealand albums chart. Kingi's 2021 album, Black Sea Golden Ladder, was written in four days at an apartment on Clyde Wharf in Wellington Harbour, as a part of the Matairangi Mahi Toi Artist Residency programme. The album was co-produced with New Zealand singer-songwriter Delaney Davidson.

Kingi plans to retire as a musician after releasing 10 albums, to become a music producer and a gardener at land he owns in Ōkaihau.

== Personal life ==
Kingi's father disappeared around Christmas 2005, while driving between Rotorua and Auckland. Kingi has five children with his wife Huia, and works with the Raid Movement, a group combatting youth suicide in Northland.

== Discography ==
=== Studio albums ===
Title	Album details	Peak chart positions		Certifications
Title	Album details	NZ	NZ Artist	Certifications
Guitar Party at Uncle's Bach (Troy Kingi & the Electric Haka Boogie)	Released: 18 November 2016; Label: Lyttelton Records; Format: CD, digital download, streaming	—	13	
Shake That Skinny Ass All the Way to Zygertron (Troy Kingi and the Galactic Chiropractors)	Released: 28 November 2017; Label: AllGood Absolute Alternative Records; Format: CD, LP, digital download, streaming	17	1	
Holy Colony Burning Acres (Troy Kingi & the Upperclass)	Released: 12 July 2019; Label: AllGood Absolute Alternative Records; Format: CD, LP, digital download, streaming	—	11	
The Ghost of Freddie Cesar (Troy Kingi & the Clutch)	Released: 11 September 2020; Label: AllGood Absolute Alternative Records; Format: CD, LP, digital download, streaming	2	1	RMNZ: Gold
Black Sea Golden Ladder	Released: 18 June 2021; Label: AllGood Absolute Alternative Records; Format: CD, LP, digital download, streaming	3	2	
Year of the Ratbags and Their Musty Theme Songs	Released: 7 October 2022; Label: AllGood Absolute Alternative Records; Format: CD, LP, digital download, streaming	2	2	
Time Wasters: Soundtrack to Current Day Meanderings	Released: 17 November 2023; Label: AllGood Absolute Alternative Records; Format: CD, LP, digital download, streaming	11	1	
Leatherman & the Mojave Green	Released: 16 August 2024; Label: AllGood Absolute Alternative Records; Format: CD, LP, digital download, streaming	5	1	
Troy Kingi Presents: Night Lords	Released: 28 November 2025; Label: AllGood Absolute Alternative Records; Format: CD, LP, digital download, streaming	18	2	
"—" denotes a recording that did not chart.

=== Reissues ===
Title	Album details	Peak chart positions	
Title	Album details	NZ	NZ Artist
Pū Whenua Hautapu, Eka Mumura (Note: A Te Reo Māori re-recording of Holy Colony Burning Acres.) (Troy Kingi & the Upperclass)	Released: 24 June 2022; Label: AllGood Absolute Alternative Records; Format: LP, digital download, streaming	18	3

=== Extended plays ===
Title	EP details	Peak chart positions	
Title	EP details	NZ	NZ Artist
Troy Kingi	Released: 21 October 2013; Label: Hongi Slicker Records; Format: Digital download, streaming	—	16
The Marine Blue Social Club (with Mokomokai)	Released: 28 August 2026; Label: Self-released; Format: Digital download, streaming	7	—

=== Singles ===
==== As lead artist ====
Title	Year	Peak chart positions		Album
Title	Year	NZ Hot	NZ Artist Hot	Album
"Break a Bone"	2015	—	—	Guitar Party at Uncle's Bach
"Cold Steel" (featuring Mara TK)	2016	—	—	Guitar Party at Uncle's Bach
"Just a Phase"	2017	—	—	Guitar Party at Uncle's Bach
"Ethiopia"	2019	—	—	Holy Colony Burning Acres
"Babylon Grows"	2019	—	—	Holy Colony Burning Acres
"All Your Ships Have Sailed"	2020	29	4	The Ghost of Freddie Cesar
"Chronophobic Disco"	2020	—	8	The Ghost of Freddie Cesar
"First Take Strut" (featuring Neko)	2021	—	—	The Ghost of Freddie Cesar
"Call My Name (School)"	2021	—	10	Black Sea Golden Ladder
"Sleep (Slumber)"	2021	—	—	Black Sea Golden Ladder
"He Ōrite" (with the Nudge)	2021	—	16	Non-album single
"Paparazzo"	2022	—	7	Year of the Ratbags and Their Musty Theme Songs
"Bastard"	2023	—	14	Time Wasters
"Through the Night"	2024	—	—	Non-album singles
"Matariki Hunga Nui (Calling Me Home)" (with Rob Ruha and Kaylee Bell)	2025	21	—	Non-album singles
"Hori on a Hoiho"	2025	33	—	Troy Kingi Presents: Night Lords
"—" denotes a recording that did not chart.

==== As featured artist ====
Title	Year	Peak chart positions		Certifications	Album
Title	Year	NZ	NZ Artist	Certifications	Album
"Aotearoa" (Stan Walker featuring Ria Hall, Troy Kingi and Maisey Rika)	2014	2	1	RMNZ: Gold	Non-album singles
"Look Up" (Sorrento featuring Troy Kingi)	2018	—	— (Note: "Look Up" did not enter the New Zealand artist top 20 chart, but peaked at number 4 on the New Zealand artist Hot 20 Singles Chart.)		Non-album singles
"Ka Mānu" (Bella Kalolo, Maisey Rika, Majic Pāora, Ria Hall, Rob Ruha, Seth Haapu, Troy Kingi, The Witch Dr.)	2019	— (Note: "Ka Mānu" did not enter the New Zealand top 40 chart, but peaked at number 20 on the Hot 40 Singles Chart.)	20		Non-album singles
"Stay" (among Tūtahi)	2020	— (Note: "Stay" did not enter the NZ Top 40 Singles Chart, but peaked at number 10 on the NZ Hot Singles Chart.)	16		Non-album singles
"Tūrangawaewae" (Tipene featuring Maisey Rika & Troy Kingi)	2021	—	— (Note: "Tūrangawaewae" did not enter the New Zealand artist top 20 chart, but peaked at number 14 on the New Zealand artist Hot 20 Singles Chart.)		Heritage Trail
"Seedling" (10:32 featuring Troy Kingi)	2021	—	—		Non-album single
"The Way We Were" (Blklist featuring Troy Kingi)	2022	—	—		TBA
"—" denotes a recording that did not chart.

=== Promotional singles ===
Title	Year	Album
"Maumaharatia" (Note: Māori language version of "Lest We Forget" from the Troy Kingi EP (2013).)	2019	Non-album promotional single
"Te Wai Nō Rua Whetū / Aztechknowledgey"	2021	Kono 003

=== Other charted songs ===
Title	Year	Peak chart positions	Album
Title	Year	NZ Artist	Album
"Shake that Skinny Ass"	2020	5	The Ghost of Freddie Cesar
"Caught in the Rain"	2020	12	The Ghost of Freddie Cesar

=== Guest appearances ===
Title	Year	Other artists	Album
"Lion Trail"	2013	Small Axe	Mt. Zion: Music from & Inspired by the Motion Picture
"Ain't No Sunshine"	2014	Whenua Patuwai	The Soul Sessions
"T'ariki Tama o Mere"	2016	Maisey Rika	Tira
"The Next Generation"	2017	Cam Galbraith	Non-album song
"Abundance"	2018	Melodownz	Melo & Blues
"The View"	2019	L(())ve & Hope, Mara TK, Ed Waaka	Non-album song
"Hold On"	2019	9-5ers, Tyla Pere	Day in the Life
"Mahi"	2019	Dharmarat	Wlknz
"Aotearoa (English Version)"	2019	Stan Walker, Ria Hall, Maisey Rika	Faith Hope Love
"Tama i Tukua"	2020	Ka Hao	Mōhau (Live Visual Album)
"Break My Heart"	2020	Spellspellspell	Non-album song
"Star to Star"	2020	Sola Rosa	Chasing the Sun
"Water"	2021	Julien Dyne	Modes
"Every Hori Is a Star"	2021	Mara TK	Bad Meditation
"Tūwhitia Te Hopo (Te Reo)"	2022	Te Kuru Dewes	Non-album songs
"Poi Pūkeko"	2022	Te Matatini, Tū Te Manawa Maurea	Non-album songs
"That Love"	2022	Melodownz, Avondale Intermediate Choir	Lone Wolf

== Filmography ==
=== Film ===
Year	Title	Role	Notes
2013	Mt. Zion	Hone	Also featured on soundtrack
2014	The Pā Boys	Tolaga Local	
2014	The Kick	Piri Weepu	
2016	Hunt for the Wilderpeople	TK	
2017	Kiwi Christmas	Tama	
2018	The Breaker Upperers	Coach	
2018	Alien Addiction	Forestry worker	
2020	Toke	Henare	
2022	Muru	Mooks	
2024	The Mountain	Tux	Also composed soundtrack

=== Television ===
Year	Title	Role	Notes
2015	Find Me a Māori Bride	David	6 episodes. 1 self-appearance
2021	The Panthers	Pussy Smith	3 episodes. Also soundtrack contributor.
2021	The Masked Singer NZ	Self	7 episodes.
