= Maisey Rika =

Māori singer-songwriter

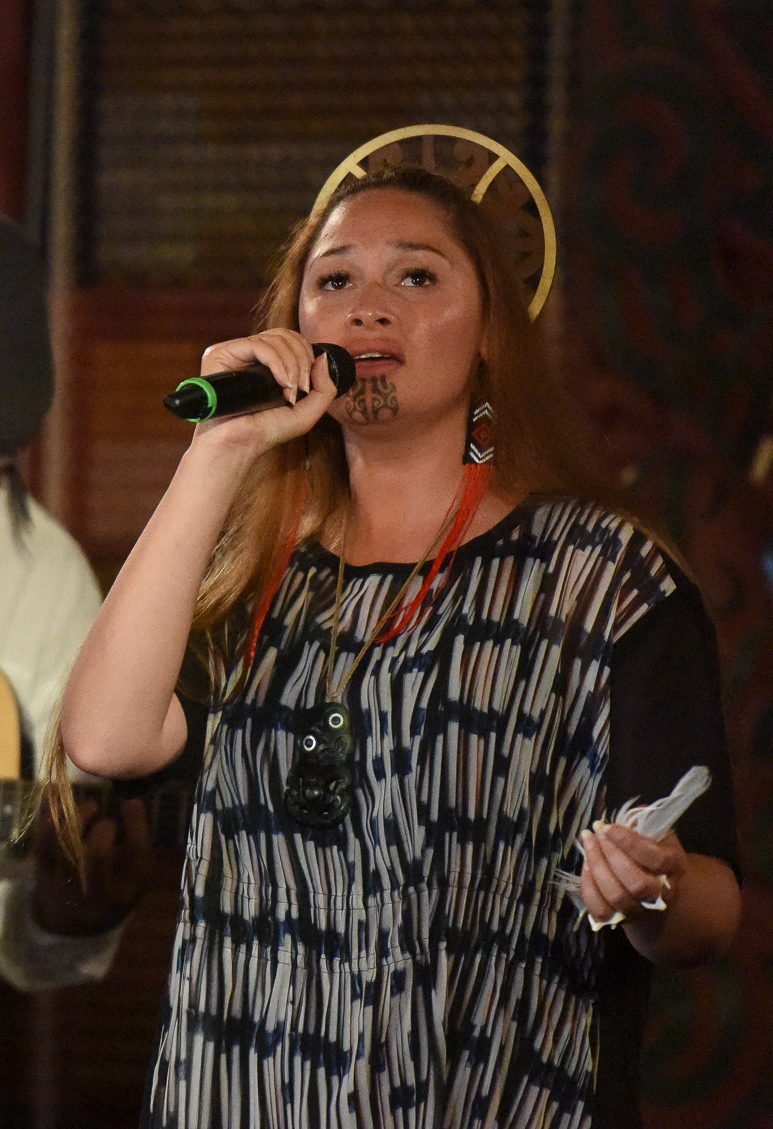
- Rika performing at an event in Māngere in 2020 commemorating the 2019 Whakaari / White Island eruption

Background information
- Born: Mei Rika; 1982 or 1983 (age 42–43); Wellington, New Zealand
- Origin: Bay of Plenty, New Zealand
- Genres: Folk; easy listening; soul
- Occupations: Musician; singer; songwriter; composer
- Instruments: Vocals; guitar
- Years active: 1997–present
- Labels: Moonlight Sounds; Maisey Rika Music
- Website: https://maiseyrikamusic.com

Maisey Rika is a New Zealand singer, songwriter and composer, performing in both English and Māori. Her five original albums have each reached the Top 40 in the Official New Zealand Music Chart. She was named an Arts Foundation Laureate in 2021, has received awards at the Waiata Māori Music Awards and APRA Awards, including APRA Best Māori Songwriter in 2010 and 2013, and has twice won Best Māori Language Album at the NZ Music Awards.

== Career ==
=== Early life ===
Rika was born in Wellington to a Ngāti Awa, Tūhoe, Te Arawa and Te Whānau-ā-Apanui mother and a Samoan father, and moved to Rotorua at a young age. While her mother did not speak Māori, Rika attended a kōhanga reo, a kura kaupapa, and Māori boarding schools, which allowed her to learn the language from a young age.

She began singing professionally at age 13. Rika was the featured soloist on E Hine, a compilation of Māori traditional songs released in 1997, which went double platinum and won Best Maori Language Album at the NZ Music Awards in 1998, as well as earning her a nomination for Best Female Vocalist, aged 15.

Rika attended University of Waikato, where she studied psychology, education and Māori language. In 2004, Rika auditioned to compete on New Zealand Idol, but did not proceed past auditions after choosing to sing in Māori.

=== 2008-present ===
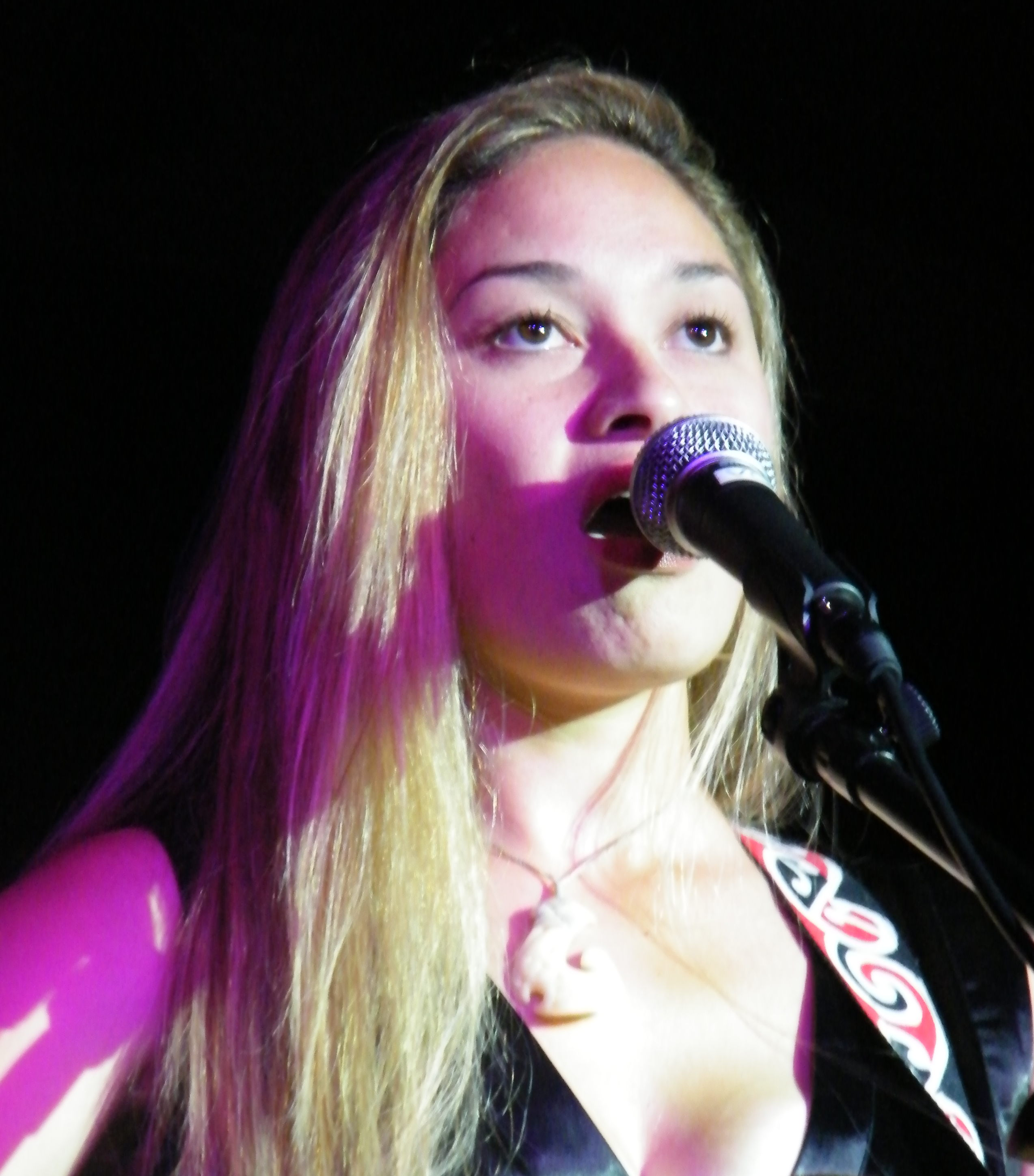
Maisey Rika performing in Wellington in 2010

Rika self-released a self-titled EP in early 2009 sung in English, which charted at No. 40 in the NZ Top 40 and drew the attention of film producer Shae Sterling, who was in the process of founding label Moonlight Sounds. Later that year, she released her debut studio album Tohu, which won her a total of four awards at the 2010 Waiata Māori Music Awards, and she toured internationally with her brother and collaborator JJ.

Rika's following album, Whitiora, was written in collaboration with her family in te reo Māori, and recorded in Rotorua. It included diverse influences such as swing, and she toured with JJ throughout the Pacific.

Rika travelled with a delegation of 100 artists from New Zealand to Guam for the 12th Festival of Pacific Arts in May 2016, representing Aotearoa.

In 2016, Rika released a Christmas album, Tira, featuring a mix of reworked Christmas hymns and new compositions.

In 2020, during the COVID-19 pandemic, Rika wrote nine songs inspired by the nine stars of Matariki, which she learned about from Māori astronomer Rangi Mātāmua. Working with new producers for the first time, including Tiki Taane, the new songs intended to connect the stars and the gods to contemporary life in Aotearoa. The resulting album, Ngā Mata o te Ariki Tāwhirimātea, was released on July 17, 2020.

Rika joined the inaugural Top 10 Te Reo Māori Singles chart released by Recorded Music NZ on June 21, 2021, with her songs "Waitī, Waitā" at number 6 and "Hiwa-i-te-Rangi" at number 8.

== Collaborations ==
Beginning in 2012, Rika performed alongside Māori singers Merenia and Whirimako Black, Ngaiire from Papua New Guinea, and aboriginal artists Emma Donovan and Ursula Yovich as The Barefoot Divas.

Rika has also performed at Matariki celebrations with Annie Crummer, Ria Hall and Betty-Anne Monga as Kāhui Whetū.

In 2014, Rika was featured on Stan Walker's song "Aotearoa", sung entirely in Māori, which reached number two on the New Zealand Singles Chart.

In 2019, Rika collaborated with composer Rob Ruha and performers Majic Pāora, Bella Kalolo, Ria Hall, Seth Haapu and Troy Kingi to release "Ka Mānu", a single in support of Māori activists occupying Ihumātao.

== Personal life ==
Rika is married to Bossy Hill, with whom she has three sons. She lives in Whakatāne.

== Discography ==
=== Studio albums ===
Title	Album details	Peak chart positions
Title	Album details	NZ
E Hine: an Anthology of Maori Love Songs (St. Joseph's Maori Girls College Choir Presents Maisey Rika)	Released: 1997; Label: South Pacific Recordings; Format: CD, digital download	—
Tohu	Released: 12 October 2009; Label: Moonlight Sounds; Format: CD, digital download, streaming	28
Whitiora	Released: 28 September 2012; Label: Moonlight Sounds; Format: CD, digital download, streaming	5
Tira	Released: 25 November 2016; Label: Moonlight Sounds; Format: Digital download, streaming	20
Ngā Mata o te Ariki Tāwhirimātea	Released: 17 July 2020; Label: Maisey Rika Music; Format: Digital download, streaming	10
Hinamarama	Released: 11 December 2023; Label: Maisey Rika Music; Format: Digital download, streaming	
"—" denotes releases that did not chart.

=== Extended plays ===
Title	Album details	Peak chart positions
Title	Album details	NZ
Maisey Rika	Released: 9 March 2009; Label: Self-released; Format: Digital download, streaming	40

=== Singles ===
==== As lead artist ====
Title	Year	Peak chart positions	Album
Title	Year	NZ Artist	Album
"Letting Go"	2009	—	Maisey Rika
"Tangaroa Whakamautai"	2012	9	Whitiora
"—" denotes a recording that did not chart.

==== As featured artist ====
Title	Year	Peak chart positions		Certifications	Album
Title	Year	NZ	NZ Artist	Certifications	Album
"Aotearoa" (Stan Walker featuring Ria Hall, Troy Kingi and Maisey Rika)	2014	2	1	RMNZ: Gold	Non-album single
"Waiaroha" (Rob Ruha featuring Maisey Rika)	2015	—	15		Pūmau
"Get Up, Stand Up" (among Tūtahi)	2016	—	—		Non-album singles
"Ka Mānu" (Bella Kalolo, Maisey Rika, Majic Pāora, Ria Hall, Rob Ruha, Seth Haapu, Troy Kingi, The Witch Dr.)	2019	— (Note: "Ka Mānu" did not enter the NZ Top 40 Singles Chart, but peaked at number 20 on the NZ Hot Singles Chart.)	20		Non-album singles
"East Coast Moon" (Tama Waipara featuring Maisey Rika)	2020	—	—		Non-album singles
"Tūrangawaewae" (Tipene featuring Maisey Rika & Troy Kingi)	2021	—	—		Heritage Trail
"—" denotes a recording that did not chart.

== Awards ==
=== The Arts Foundation ===
Rika was named an Arts Foundation Laureate in 2021. She received the Jillian Friedlander Te Moana-nui-a-kiwa Award, a $25,000 prize that recognizes outstanding Māori and Pasifika artists.

=== NZ Music Awards ===
Rika has twice been awarded Best Māori Language Album at the NZ Music Awards, in 1998 for her appearance as a soloist on E Hine and in 2013 for her album Whitiora. Her appearance on E Hine also earned her a 1998 nomination for Best Female Vocalist. For the 2017 NZ Music Awards, Rika was nominated as Best Māori Artist, but withdrew ahead of the awards ceremony to avoid elevating herself above other Māori artists, according to her manager.

=== APRA Awards ===
Rika was nominated for the APRA Maioha Award for her song "Repeat Offender" in 2009. She won the same award in 2013 with Te Kahautu Maxwell, and Mahuia Bridgman-Cooper for their song "Ruaimoko".

Rika also won APRA Best Māori Songwriter in both 2010 and 2013.

Her songs "Hiwa-i-te-rangi" and "Turangawaewae" were both named top 20 finalists for the 2021 APRA Silver Scroll.

=== Waiata Māori Music Awards ===
The Waiata Māori Music Awards are judged by members of the Māori music industry.

Year	Nominee / work	Award	Result
2009	Maisey Rika	Best Māori Female Solo Artist	Won
2010	Maisey Rika	Best Māori Female Solo Artist	Won
2010	Maisey Rika	Best Māori Songwriter	Won
2010	Tohu	Best Māori Pop Album	Won
2010	"Nia"	Best Māori Song	Won
2013	Maisey Rika	Best Māori Songwriter	Won
2013	Maisey Rika	Best Māori Female Solo Artist	Won
2013	"Tangaroa Whakamautai"	Best Music Video by a Māori Artist	Won
2013	"Tangaroa Whakamautai"	Best Māori Song	Won
2013	Whitiora	Best Māori Traditional Album (Te Reo)	Won
2013	Whitiora	Best Māori Pop Album	Nominated
2017	Maisey Rika	Best Māori Songwriter	Won
2017	Maisey Rika	Best Māori Female Artist	Won
2017	Tira	Best Traditional Māori Album	Won
2017	"Taku Mana"	Best Song by a Māori Artist	Won
2020	"Ka Mānu" (with Rob Ruha, Horomona Horo, Majic Paora, Troy Kingi, Ria Hall, Seth Haapu & Bella Kalolo)	Radio Airplay Song of the Year by a Māori Artist in Te Reo	Won
