= Ka Hao =

New Zealand youth choir

- Origin: Te Tairāwhiti / Gisborne District, New Zealand
- Years active: 2019–present
- Label: InDigiNation Music
- Members: Jhaymeān Terekia; Gracie Kopua; Kaea Hills; Manaakiao Maxwell; Ruawhaitiri Ngatai-Mahue
- Website: facebook.com/kahaotirawaiata

Ka Hao (English: "to catch [in a net]") is a New Zealand youth choir that formed in 2019. Coming from the Gisborne District, the group performs music in the Māori language. In 2020 the group won the Mana Reo Award at the 2020 Aotearoa Music Awards, as a part of the supergroup Mōhau. In 2021 the group released their debut single "35", which after gaining popularity through TikTok was one of the most successful songs performed in Māori during Te Wiki o te Reo Māori 2021.

== Background ==
Ka Hao formed in Te Tairāwhiti / Gisborne District, as a project to promote and revitalise te Reo Māori. The group's name refers to the proverb ka pū te ruha, ka hao te rangatahi (as the old fishing net is worn, a new one is made), referring to youth growing up and entering adulthood. The approximately 24 members attended Kura Kaupapa Māori (immersion schools), and many are Ngāti Porou, while all have strong ties to te Tairāwhiti. Ka Hao first performed in October 2019 as a part of the Te Tairāwhiti Arts Festival. In January 2020, the group released a live album of gospel waiata in te Reo, as a part of the supergroup Mōhau. The album won the Te Māngai Pāho Mana Reo Award and the Best Worship Artist Te Kaipuoro Kairangi Toa award at the 2020 Aotearoa Music Awards.

Ka Hao released their debut single "35" in September 2021, a song that references State Highway 35. The song, featuring Rob Ruha, gained popularity during Te Wiki o te Reo Māori in 2021 after the song became popular on TikTok. The group released their debut album Ka Hao: One Tira, One Voice on 17 September, after being mentored by Anglican bishop Don Tamihere, musician Rob Ruha and music manager Cilla Ruha. Ka Hao were later featured on one of the singles preceding singer Rob Ruha's album Preservation of Scenery.

== Discography ==
=== Studio albums ===
Title	Album details	Peak chart positions
Title	Album details	NZ Artist
Ka Hao: One Tira, One Voice	Released: 17 September 2021; Label: InDigiNation Music; Format: Digital download, streaming	16

=== Singles ===
==== As lead artist ====
Title	Year	Peak chart positions		Certifications	Album
Title	Year	NZ	NZ Artist	Certifications	Album
"35" (featuring Rob Ruha)	2021	12	1	RMNZ: Platinum	Ka Hao: One Tira, One Voice

==== As featured artist ====
Title	Year	Peak chart positions	Album
Title	Year	NZ Artist Hot	Album
"Taka Rawa" (Rob Ruha featuring Ka Hao)	2021	7	Preservation of Scenery

=== Other charted songs ===
Title	Year	Peak chart positions	Album
Title	Year	NZ Artist Hot	Album
"Closer to You"	2021	11	Ka Hao: One Tira, One Voice

=== Guest appearances ===
Title	Year	Other artists	Album
"Aue Wairua"	2020	Rob Ruha	Mōhau (Live Visual Album)
"Paiheretia"	2020	Kaaterama	Mōhau (Live Visual Album)
"He Māramatanga"	2020	Majic Paora	Mōhau (Live Visual Album)
"Tāria"	2020	Bella Kalolo	Mōhau (Live Visual Album)
"Amine"	2020	Ria Hall	Mōhau (Live Visual Album)
"Tama i Tukua"	2020	Troy Kingi	Mōhau (Live Visual Album)
"Rongo"	2020	—N/a	Mōhau (Live Visual Album)
"Witi me te Waina"	2020	Rob Ruha	Mōhau (Live Visual Album)
