= Te Taura Whiri i te Reo Māori =

Organisation for the Māori language

Te Taura Whiri i te Reo Māori (Māori for 'The Plaiting Rope of the Native Language') or the Māori Language Commission is an autonomous Crown entity in New Zealand set up under the Māori Language Act 1987 with the following functions:

1. To initiate, develop, co-ordinate, review, advise upon, and assist in the implementation of policies, procedures, measures, and practices designed to give effect to the declaration in section 3 of this Act of the Māori language as an official language of New Zealand
2. Generally to promote the Māori language, and, in particular, its use as a living language and as an ordinary means of communication
3. The functions conferred on the commission by sections 15 to 20 of this Act in relation to certificates of competency in the Māori language
4. To consider and report to the Minister upon any matter relating to the Māori language that the Minister may from time to time refer to the commission for its advice
5. Such other functions as may be conferred upon the commission by any other enactment

== History ==
In early October 2025, Minister of Māori Development Tama Potaka appointed Mahanga Pihama to the Language Commission's board for a three-year term. He also appointed Jeremy Tātere MacLeod as the commission's deputy chair.

== See also ==
- Language policy
- Language revival
- List of language regulators
