= Ria Hall =

New Zealand musician

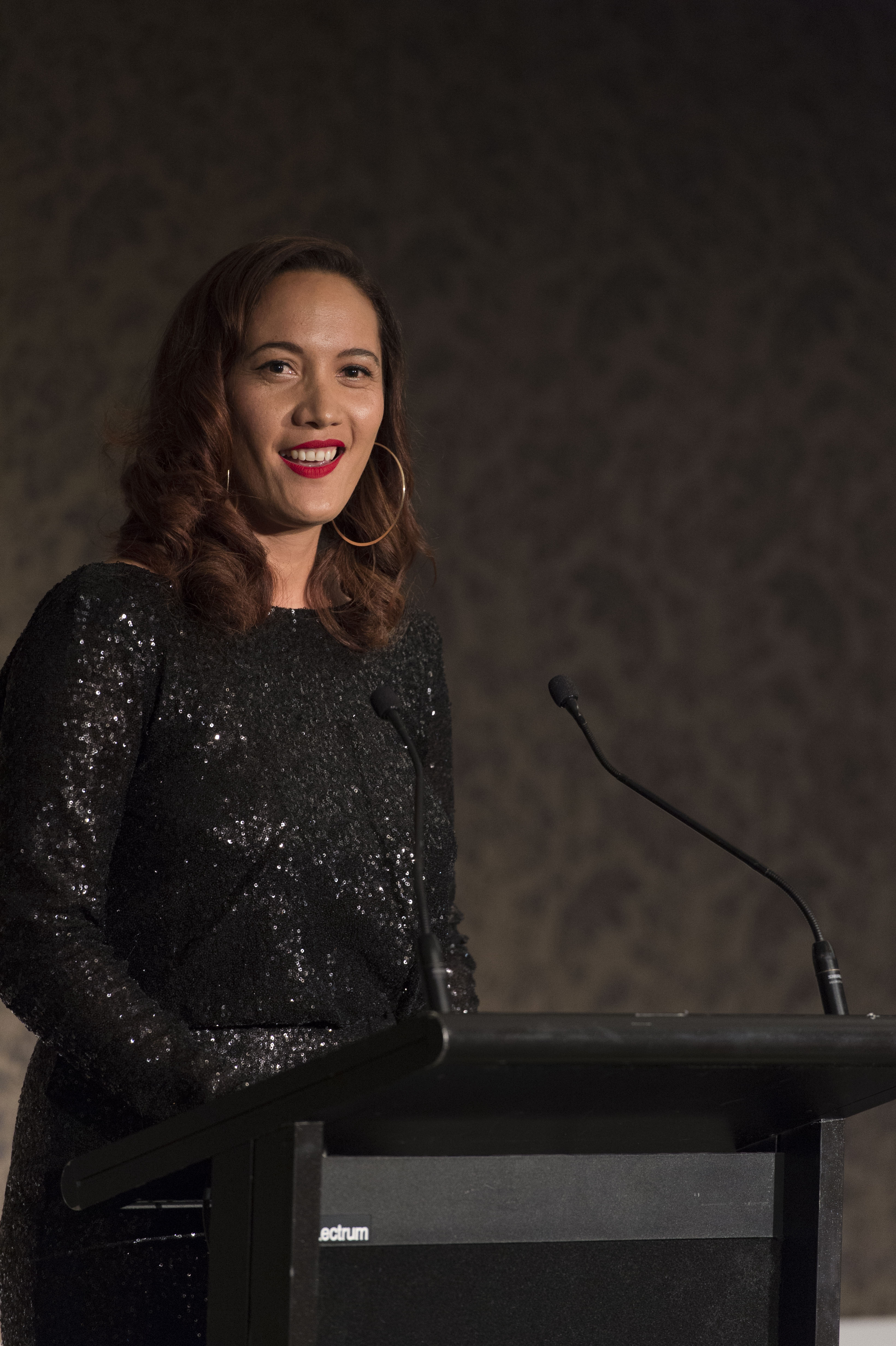
- Hall in 2016

Background information
- Born: 1982 or 1983 (age 43–44); Maungatapu, Bay of Plenty, New Zealand
- Origin: Tauranga, Bay of Plenty, New Zealand
- Genre: New Zealand hip hop * New Zealand reggae * soul * R&B
- Years active: 2011–present

Ria Hall (born 1982 or 1983) is a Māori recording artist, singer-songwriter, television presenter, and political candidate. She has released two solo albums, Rules of Engagement (2017), which topped the Official New Zealand Music Chart shortly after its release, and Manawa Wera (2020). Her work reflects Māori society and history, and Hall regularly sings in Māori as well as English.

Born in Tauranga with an extensive background in kapa haka, she moved to Wellington in her early twenties to attend university and launch her music career. She initially fronted the reggae band Hope Road. After sporadically performing with other contemporary Māori musical acts, such as TrinityRoots, Hall rose to prominence after performing the New Zealand national anthem for the opening ceremony of the 2011 Rugby World Cup. Her self-titled debut EP, released that year, won Best Māori Album at the 2012 New Zealand Music Awards. Her debut album Rules of Engagement is a concept album about the Tauranga Campaign, specifically the Battle of Gate Pā, featuring contributions from Tiki Taane and Che Fu. Hall would later win Best Māori Female Artist at the Waiata Māori Music Awards for the work. Her second album Manawa Wera featured collaborations with Rob Ruha and L.A.B, and peaked at number 10 on the Official Albums Chart. Her song 'Te Ahi Kā Pō' won the APRA Silver Scroll in 2021.

Hall has also had a prominent career as a television presenter on Whakaata Māori (formerly Māori Television), one of New Zealand's two state-owned indigenous television networks. She has also collaborated with Stan Walker, Maisey Rika, and Troy Kingi. Having long been involved in advocacy for the Bay of Plenty, in 2024 Hall announced her candidacy for Mayor of Tauranga in the 2024 Tauranga mayoral election, part of the first local elections since the 2021 suspension of Tauranga's local government. She came third.

== Life and career ==
Hall was born in 1982 or 1983 in Maungatapu, Tauranga, where she grew up on marae with her three older sisters. She is Māori, and affiliates to Ngāi Te Rangi, Ngāti Ranginui, Te Whānau ā Apanui, Ngāti Porou, Ngāti Tūwharetoa, and Waikato. She attended Maungatapu School, Tauranga Intermediate and Tauranga Girls' College. At secondary school she became interested in singing through kapa haka and later joined the kapa haka group Waka Huia. One of Hall's musical influences as a teenager was Che Fu's 1998 album 2 B.S. Pacific, which she reportedly listened on repeat when studying for her final exams at secondary school. Hall has said the album "changed the entire hip-hop, soul and R&B scene in New Zealand... It was such a necessary record at the time. I just found it really inspiring that he was Māori/Niuean and representing unashamedly what was possible in the New Zealand music scene for someone of a Polynesian persuasion."

Hall later moved to Wellington in 2006, where she studied political science at Victoria University of Wellington. There, she formed the reggae band Hope Road. She began to sing with TrinityRoots upon their reunion in 2010. She sang at the opening ceremony for the 2011 Rugby World Cup, and released her debut self-titled EP in 2011, which won Best Māori Album at the 2012 New Zealand Music Awards. In 2013 Hall featured as a guest vocalist on Stan Walker's single "Like It's Over". From 2012 to 2013, she was a presenter on Māori Television's AIA Marae DIY. Her debut album Rules of Engagement was released in 2017. A concept album about the Tauranga Campaign, specifically the Battle of Gate Pā, it featured contributions from Tiki Taane and Che Fu. She won the title of Best Māori Female Artist at the Waiata Māori Music Awards for the work. Her second album Manawa Wera featured collaborations with Rob Ruha and L.A.B, and peaked at number 10 on the Official Albums Chart. Her song 'Te Ahi Kā Pō' won the APRA Silver Scroll in 2021.

Hall has also collaborated with Hollie Smith, Laughton Kora, Kings, Fly My Pretties, Betty-Anne Monga and Whirimako Black. She has three children and continues to live in Tauranga.

=== Politics ===
On 5 May 2024, Hall announced that she would run in that year's election for Mayor of Tauranga. These were the first local elections in Tauranga since the 2021 suspension of its city council. In a press release, Hall was described as a longtime political advocate for Tauranga through her music. Hall came third, being excluded on the 13th iteration and missing the runoff which was subsequently won by Mahé Drysdale. She congratulated him and said running for council was an "absolute privilege".

== Musical style and influences ==
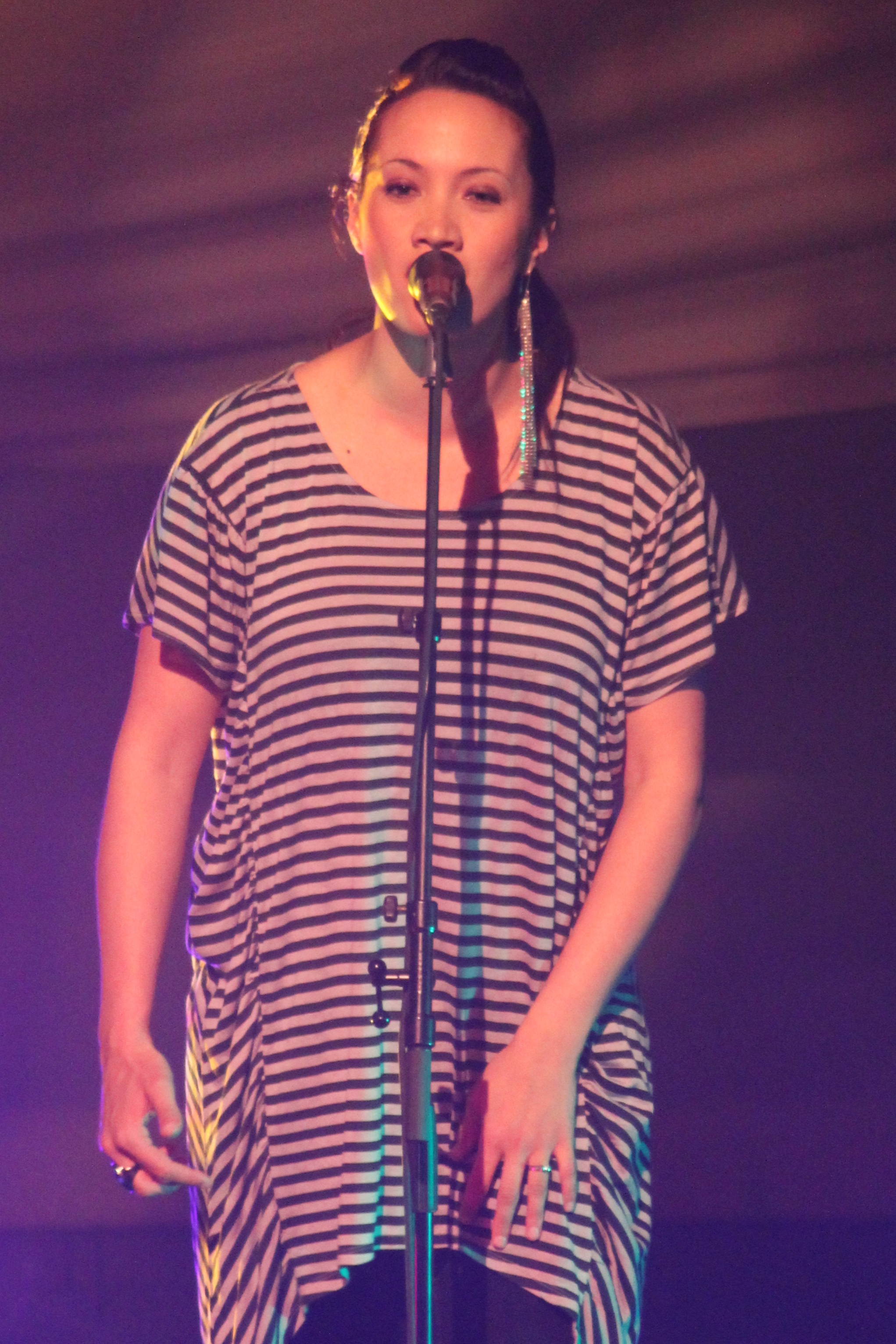
Hall performing with TrinityRoots, 2010

Hall classifies her music as mainly roots and reggae, with influences of ragga, soul and hip hop music. She grew up listening to reggae, soul, hip hop and R&B, and her mother listened to country music.

== Discography ==
=== Studio albums ===
Title	Album details	Peak chart positions	
Title	Album details	NZ	NZ Artist
Rules of Engagement	Released: 27 October 2017; Label: Loop Recordings Aot(ear)oa; Format: CD, digital download, streaming	6	1
Manawa Wera	Released: 28 February 2020; Label: Loop Recordings Aot(ear)oa; Format: CD, digital download, streaming	—	10
"—" denotes a recording that did not chart.

=== Extended plays ===
Title	Album details	Peak chart positions
Title	Album details	NZ
Ria Hall EP	Released: 3 October 2011; Label: Tu Taniwha Entertainment; Format: CD, digital download, streaming	20

=== Singles ===
Title	Year	Album
"Hotuhotu" (Robert Ruha & Ria Hall)	2011	Mīharo: He Kohikohinga Waiata Māori
"Love Will Lead Us Home"	2016	Rules of Engagement
"Tell Me" (featuring Che Fu)	2017	Rules of Engagement
"Barely Know" (featuring Kings)	2017	Rules of Engagement
"Black Light" (featuring Mara TK)	2017	Rules of Engagement
"Te Ahi Kai Pō"	2017	Rules of Engagement
"Cause & Effect"	2019	Manawa Wera
"Flow"	2019	Manawa Wera
"Owner"	2020	Manawa Wera

==== As featured artist ====
Title	Year	Peak chart positions		Certifications	Album
Title	Year	NZ	NZ Artist	Certifications	Album
"Like It's Over" (Stan Walker featuring Ria Hall)	2013	19	4	RMNZ: Gold	Inventing Myself
"Sensitive to a Smile" (among Aotearoa Reggae All Stars)	2013	2	1	RMNZ: Gold	Non-album single
"Ms Rita" (J. Williams featuring Sid Diamond & Ria Hall)	2013	—	20		Non-album single
"Aotearoa" (Stan Walker featuring Ria Hall, Troy Kingi and Maisey Rika)	2014	2	1	RMNZ: Gold	Non-album single
"No Place Like Home" (Tiki Taane featuring Ria Hall & friends)	2016	—	10		Non-album single
"Ka Mānu" (Bella Kalolo, Maisey Rika, Majic Pāora, Ria Hall, Rob Ruha, Seth Haapu, Troy Kingi, The Witch Dr.)	2019	— (Note: "Ka Mānu" did not enter the New Zealand top 40 chart, but peaked at number 20 on the Hot 40 Singles Chart.)	20		Non-album single
"Why Am I Here" (Tiki Taane featuring Ria Hall)	2020	—	—		Non-album single
"Stay" (among Tūtahi)	2020	— (Note: "Stay" did not enter the NZ Top 40 Singles Chart, but peaked at number 10 on the NZ Hot Singles Chart.)	16		Non-album single
"—" denotes items that failed to chart.

==== Promotional singles ====
Title	Year	Album
"Rangatira / Owner"	2021	Kono 003

=== Guest appearances ===
Title	Year	Other artists	Album
"I Ngā Wā, Taumaha Ai (Bridge Over Troubled Water)"	2010	—N/a	Tipi Haere Te Reo
"He Hoa Tāku, Tōmuri Rawa (Is You Is or Is You Ain't My Baby)"	2010	—N/a	Tipi Haere Te Reo
"Tihore Mai te Rangi"	2012	—N/a	He Rangi Paihuarere (A Tribute to the Late Dr. Hirini Melbourne)
"Falling Angels"	2014	Tiki Taane, Maitreya, the Auckland Gospel Choir	Non-album song
"So Amazing"	2014	Whenua Patuwai	The Soul Sessions
"Nana's Song"	2014	Tiki Taane	With Strings Attached (Alive & Orchestrated)
"The Deeds of Mercy"	2017	Paul McLaney	Play On
"Ka Ihi te Moana"	2017	Rob Ruha, The Witch Dr.	Survivance
"Aotearoa (English version)"	2019	Stan Walker, Troy Kingi, Maisey Rika	Faith Hope Love
"Amine"	2020	Ka Hao	Mōhau (Live Visual Album)
"E Tama Hikairo"	2022	Te Matatini, Ōpōtiki-Mai-Tawhiti	Non-album song
