= Waiata / Anthems =

Compilation album by various artists
- Released: 6 September 2019
- Recorded: 2019
- Genres: Pop, Pop rock
- Length: 40:41
- Label: Universal Music New Zealand

Waiata / Anthems is compilation album by New Zealand artists, whereby they re-record previous songs from English to Māori language. It was released in New Zealand 6 September 2019 and it debuted at number 1 on the Official New Zealand Music Chart.

Singer and songwriter, and project coordinator, Hinewehi Mohi said, "These tracks are well known to people so that they can connect the English words they know to the Māori translation and feel like they're accessing Te Reo Māori through something familiar."

Translations from English to Māori language was completed by Tīmoti Kāretu, Jeremy Tātere MacLeod and Tama Waipara, and are credited, accordingly in the song credits below.

== Background and release ==
In 1999, singer and songwriter Hinewehi Mohi stood in front of 70,000 people at a 1999 Rugby World Cup pool stage match in Twickenham and sang the New Zealand national anthem in Te Reo Māori language instead of English. The feedback was overwhelmingly negative, and Mohi was forced to defend herself. This proved to be a turning point, sparking a national conversation about cultural identity and the first language of New Zealand. Today, New Zealanders all over the country proudly sing the national anthem in both English and Te Reo Māori.

20 years on, Mohi decided to mark that anniversary and 11 of New Zealand's best-loved artists performing their hit songs in Te Reo Māori, as well as the national anthem "Aotearoa / God Defend New Zealand" by Hātea Kapa Haka. Mohi said, "It was initially meant to be a bilingual album, but the artists said to me 'I want to do it all in Māori' [and] only one is a fluent speaker, so for most of them this was their first real opportunity to sing in Māori." Mohi worked directly with artists in the studio to guide their intonation and understanding of the new Māori lyrics, with translations assisted by Sir Tīmoti Kāretu.

Bic Runga enthused about the experience re-recording her classic "Sway" saying, "[it's] something I've always wanted to try but I was at a loss to know where to start. Having Hinewehi Mohi guide me through this process so generously has been really wonderful. I had to record the vocal well over 50 times to get it even close to right, but to finally sing in my own native tongue has been a really moving experience." Runga added it is "a really meaningful project to me."

The album was recorded over 10 weeks in 2019 and released to coincide with te Wiki o te Reo Māori (Māori Language Week). The album artwork was by Kauri Hawkins and represents the 'manu' or songbird and how music can be used to tell stories and to share Te Reo Māori. The manu figure can be seen as a face and has references to te reo Māori the 'native tongue'.

== Continuation ==
Due to the success of the project, by 2021 Waiata / Anthems was expanded to become Waiata Anthems Week, an annual release of music in Te Reo Māori scheduled for release just prior to te Wiki o te Reo Māori. In 2021, 30 musicians participated in the project, which was compiled into a playlist instead of a traditional album. This included musicians such as Six60, Hollie Smith, Tomorrow People. Some musicians opted to release multiple songs as a part of the project, including Lorde's Te Ao Mārama, an extended play featuring five compositions from her third studio album Solar Power (2021), and Stan Walker, who released an entire Māori language album, Te Arohanui.

In the first week of September, Six60's composition "Pepeha" debuted at number two on the Official New Zealand Music Chart.

== Track listing ==
No.	Title	Writer(s)	Producer(s)	Length
1.	"Aotearoa / God Defend New Zealand" (by Hātea Kapa Haka)	Thomas Henry Smith; John Joseph Woods	Simon Gooding	1:12
2.	"Kia Mau Ki Tō Ūkaipō / Don't Forget Your Roots" (by Six60)	Ji Fraser; Matiu Walters; Tīmoti Kāretu	Marlon Gerbes; Matiu Walters	3:48
3.	"Tēnā Rā Koe / Thank You" (by Stan Walker)	Michael Fatkin; Stan Walker; Vince Harder; Kāretu	Stan Walker	3:57
4.	"Kua Kore He Kupu / Soaked" (by Benee)	Stella Bennett; Joshua Fountain; Djeisan Suskov; Kāretu	Fountain; Soskov	3:59
5.	"I Moeroa / Woke Up Late" (by Drax Project)	Devin Abrams; Shaan Singh; Matt Beachen; Ben O'Leary; Sam Thomson; Kāretu; Jeremy Tātere MacLeod	Shaan Singh	3:04
6.	"Ngā Kano / In Colour" (by Shapeshifter)	Abrams; Nicholas Robinson; Paora Apera; Samuel Trevethick; Kāretu	Greg Haver	3:56
7.	"Kei Aro Atu Koe / Don't Worry 'bout It" (Kings)	Kingdon Chapple-Wilson	Kingdon Chapple-Wilson	3:38
8.	"Kei Tōku Ngākau Nei Koe / Always on My Mind" (by Tiki Taane)	Nathan Glen Taane Tinorau; Kāretu	Tiki Taane	2:55
9.	"Pōtere Ana / Drift Away" (by Sons of Zion)	Matt Sadgrove; Kāretu	Matt Sadgrove	2:59
10.	"Haere Mai Rā / Sway" (by Bic Runga)	Bic Runga; Kāretu	Kody Nielson	4:44
11.	"E Kore Rawa E Wehe / Never Be Apart" (by Teeks)	Te Karehana Gardiner-Toi	Te Karehana Gardiner-Toi	3:19
12.	"Roimata / Cry Myself to Sleep" (by Tami Neilson)	Tami Neilson; Kāretu; Tama Waipara	Tami Neilson	2:55

== Charts ==
=== Weekly charts ===
Chart (2019)	Peak position
New Zealand Albums (RMNZ)	1

=== Year-end charts ===
Chart (2019)	Position
New Zealand (Recorded Music NZ)	25
New Zealand Artist (Recorded Music NZ)	6
Chart (2020)	Position
New Zealand (Recorded Music NZ)	45
New Zealand Artist (Recorded Music NZ)	10

== Certifications ==
Region	Certification	Certified units/sales
New Zealand (RMNZ)	Platinum	15,000^{‡}
^{‡} Sales+streaming figures based on certification alone.

== See also ==
- List of number-one albums from the 2010s (New Zealand)
- Te Wiki o te Reo Māori
