= New Zealand top 50 singles of 2018 =

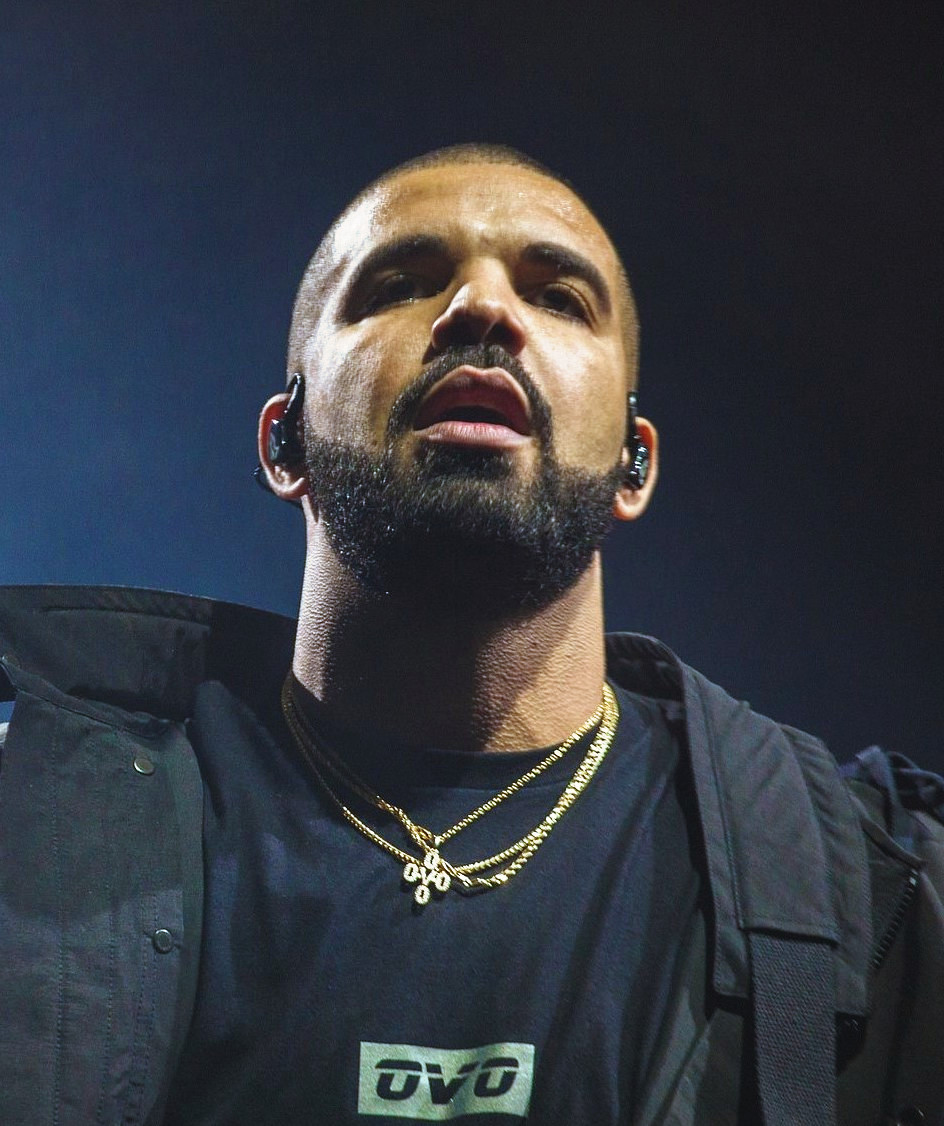
Canadian rapper Drake released the top single of 2018, "God's Plan"

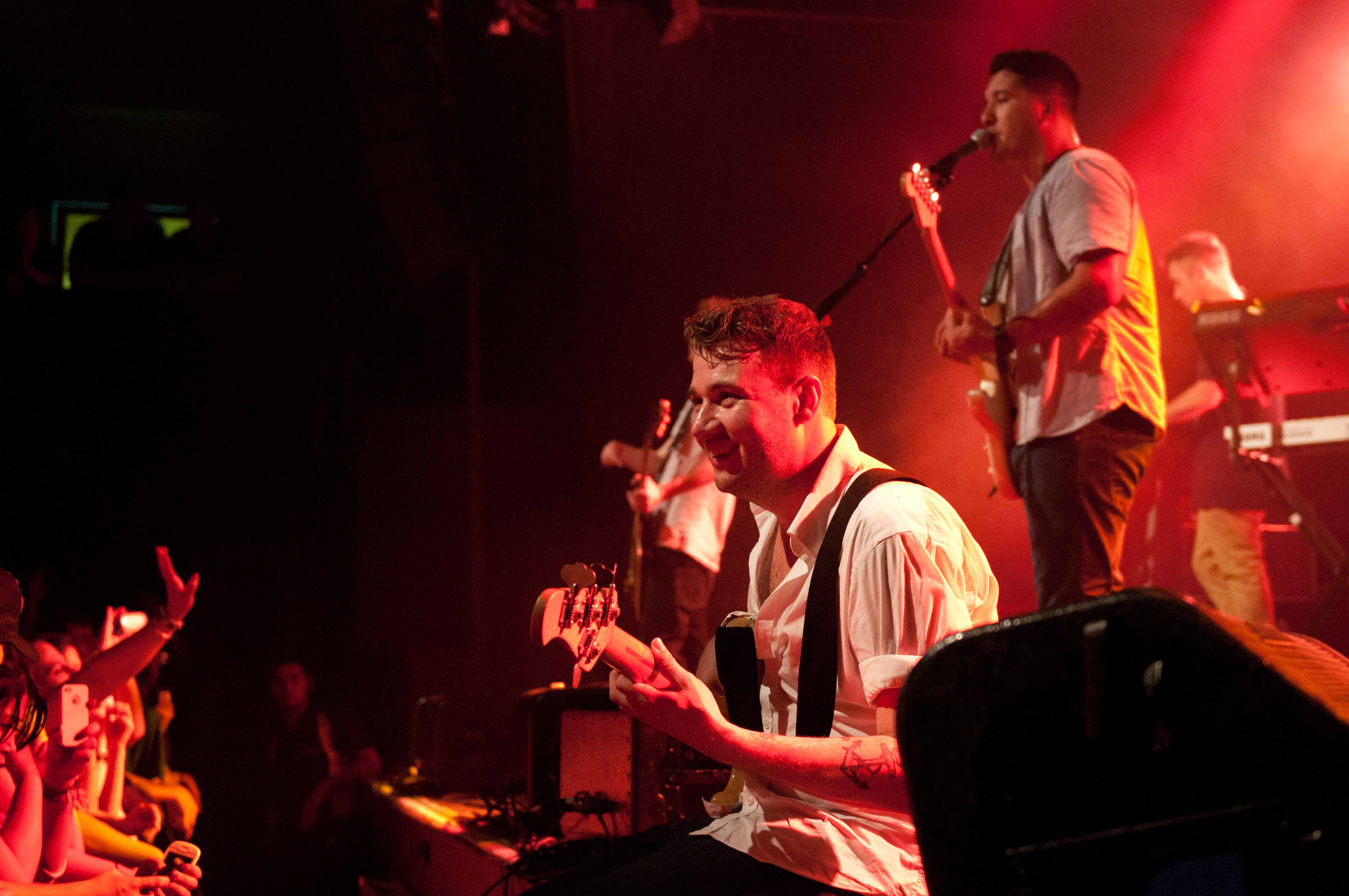
"Vibes" (2017) by New Zealand band Six60 was the top performing New Zealand song of 2018

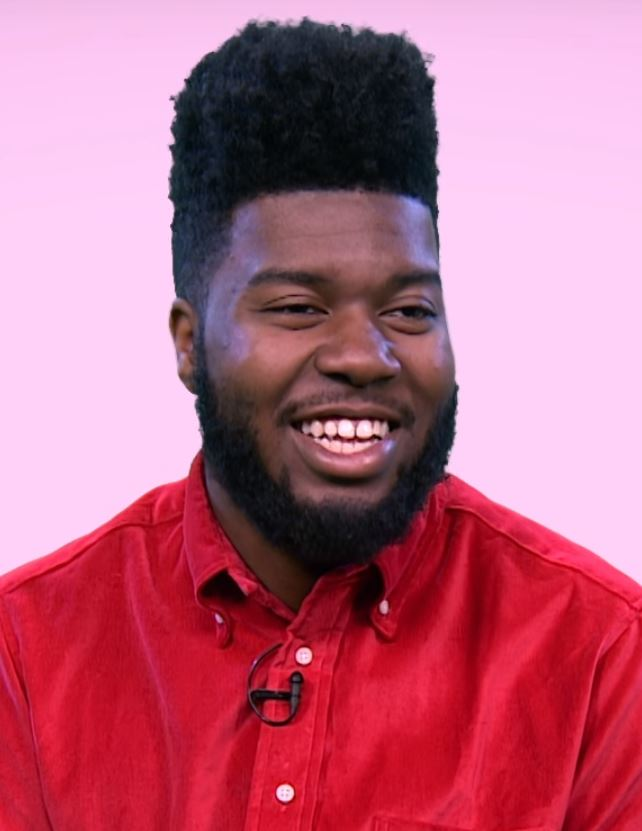
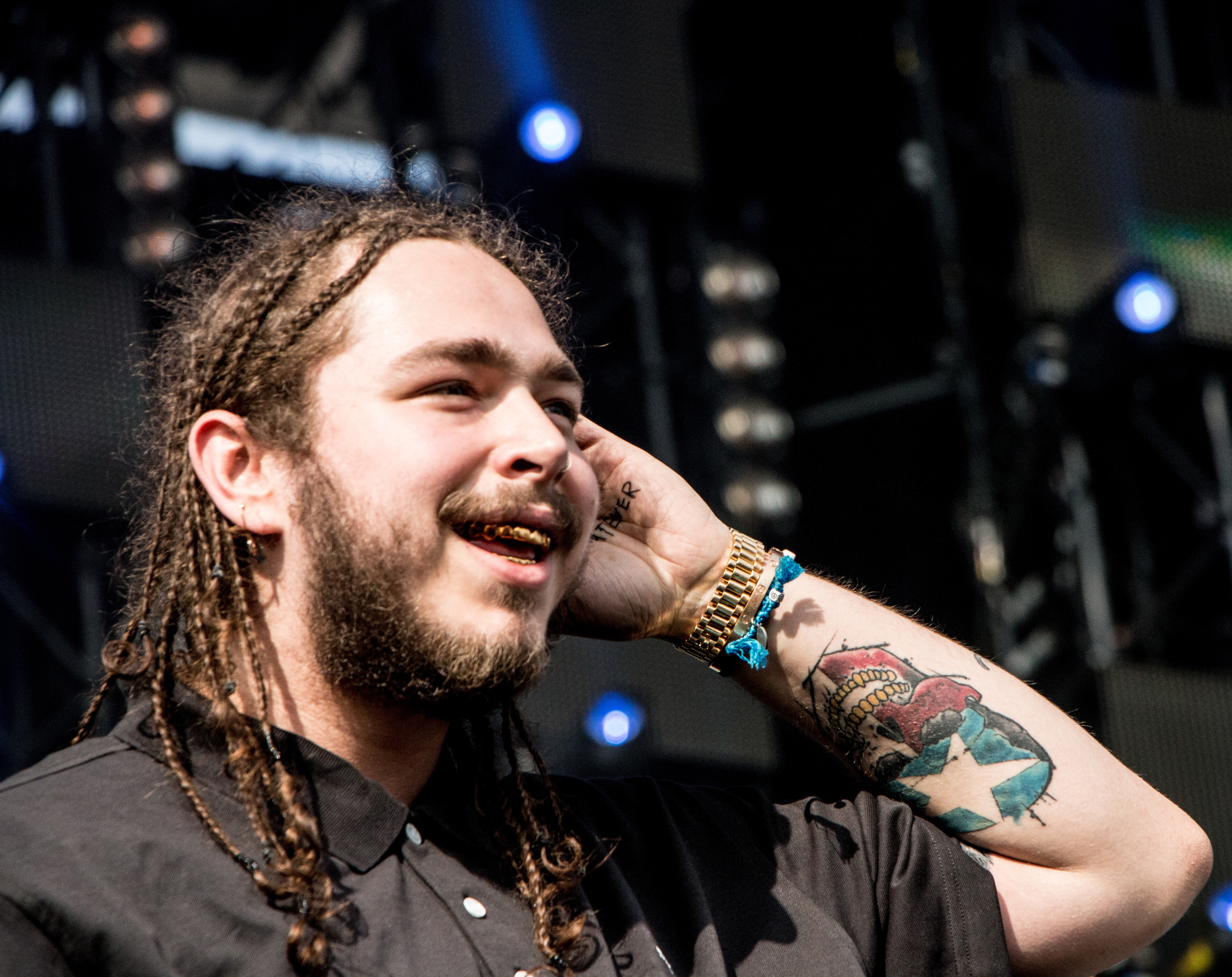
American musicians Khalid (top) and Post Malone (bottom) each had five songs respectively in the top 50 singles

This is a list of the top-selling singles in New Zealand for 2018 from the Official New Zealand Music Chart's end-of-year chart, compiled by Recorded Music NZ. Recorded Music NZ also published list of the top 20 singles released by New Zealand artists for the same time period.

== Chart ==
Key
† – Song of New Zealand origin (Note: Whether or not a song is of New Zealand origin is determined by the Recorded Music NZ.)

Rank	Artist	Song
1	Drake	"God's Plan"
2	Ed Sheeran	"Perfect"
3	5 Seconds of Summer	"Youngblood"
4	Post Malone featuring Ty Dolla Sign	"Psycho"
5	Khalid and Normani	"Love Lies"
6	Post Malone	"I Fall Apart"
7	Maroon 5 featuring Cardi B	"Girls Like You"
8	Bebe Rexha and Florida Georgia Line	"Meant to Be"
9	Post Malone featuring 21 Savage	"Rockstar"
10	Post Malone	"Better Now"
11	XXXTentacion	"Sad!"
12	Drake	"Nice for What"
13	Benny Blanco featuring Halsey and Khalid	"Eastside"
14	Rudimental featuring Jess Glynne, Macklemore and Dan Caplen	"These Days"
15	Dua Lipa	"IDGAF"
16	Kendrick Lamar and SZA	"All the Stars"
17	Six60	"Vibes"
18	Bruno Mars	"Finesse"
19	Camila Cabello featuring Young Thug	"Havana"
20	Ed Sheeran	"Shape of You"
21	Tyga featuring Offset	"Taste"
22	Six60	"Don't Give It Up"
23	Cardi B, Bad Bunny and J Balvin	"I Like It"
24	Billie Eilish featuring Khalid	"Lovely"
25	George Ezra	"Shotgun"
26	Zedd, Maren Morris and Grey	"The Middle"
27	Bazzi	"Mine"
28	Drake	"In My Feelings"
29	Six60	"Closer"
30	Lil Dicky featuring Chris Brown	"Freaky Friday"
31	Eminem featuring Ed Sheeran	"River"
32	Post Malone	"Candy Paint"
33	Juice Wrld	"Lucid Dreams"
34	Drax Project	"Woke Up Late"
35	Marshmello and Anne-Marie	"Friends"
36	Marshmello featuring Khalid	"Silence"
37	Camila Cabello	"Never Be the Same"
38	Portugal. The Man	"Feel It Still"
39	Calvin Harris and Dua Lipa	"One Kiss"
40	Dean Lewis	"Be Alright"
41	Dua Lipa	"New Rules"
42	Anne-Marie	"2002"
43	XXXTentacion	"Jocelyn Flores"
44	Dennis Lloyd	"Nevermind"
45	Keala Settle and The Greatest Showman Ensemble	"This Is Me"
46	Ariana Grande	"No Tears Left to Cry"
47	Loud Luxury featuring Brando	"Body"
48	Travis Scott featuring Drake	"Sicko Mode"
49	Khalid	"Young Dumb & Broke"
50	Sons of Zion	"Drift Away"

== Top 20 singles by New Zealand artists ==
Rank	Artist	Song
1	Six60	"Vibes"
2	Six60	"Don't Give It Up"
3	Six60	"Closer"
4	Drax Project featuring Hailee Steinfeld	"Woke Up Late"
5	Sons of Zion	"Drift Away"
6	Six60	"Rivers"
7	Robinson	"Nothing to Regret"
8	Six60	"Rolling Stone"
9	Mitch James	"21"
10	Six60	"Up There"
11	Lorde featuring Khalid, Post Malone and SZA	"Homemade Dynamite (Remix)"
12	Lorde	"Green Light"
13	Drax Project	"Toto"
14	Kings	"Don't Worry Bout It"
15	Mitch James	"All the Ways to Say Goodbye"
16	Stan Walker	"Thank You"
17	Kings	"6 Figures"
18	Sons of Zion featuring Aaradhna	"Is That Enough"
19	Machete Clan	"On the Rark"
20	Kings	"You Do"
