= New Zealand top 50 singles of 2019 =

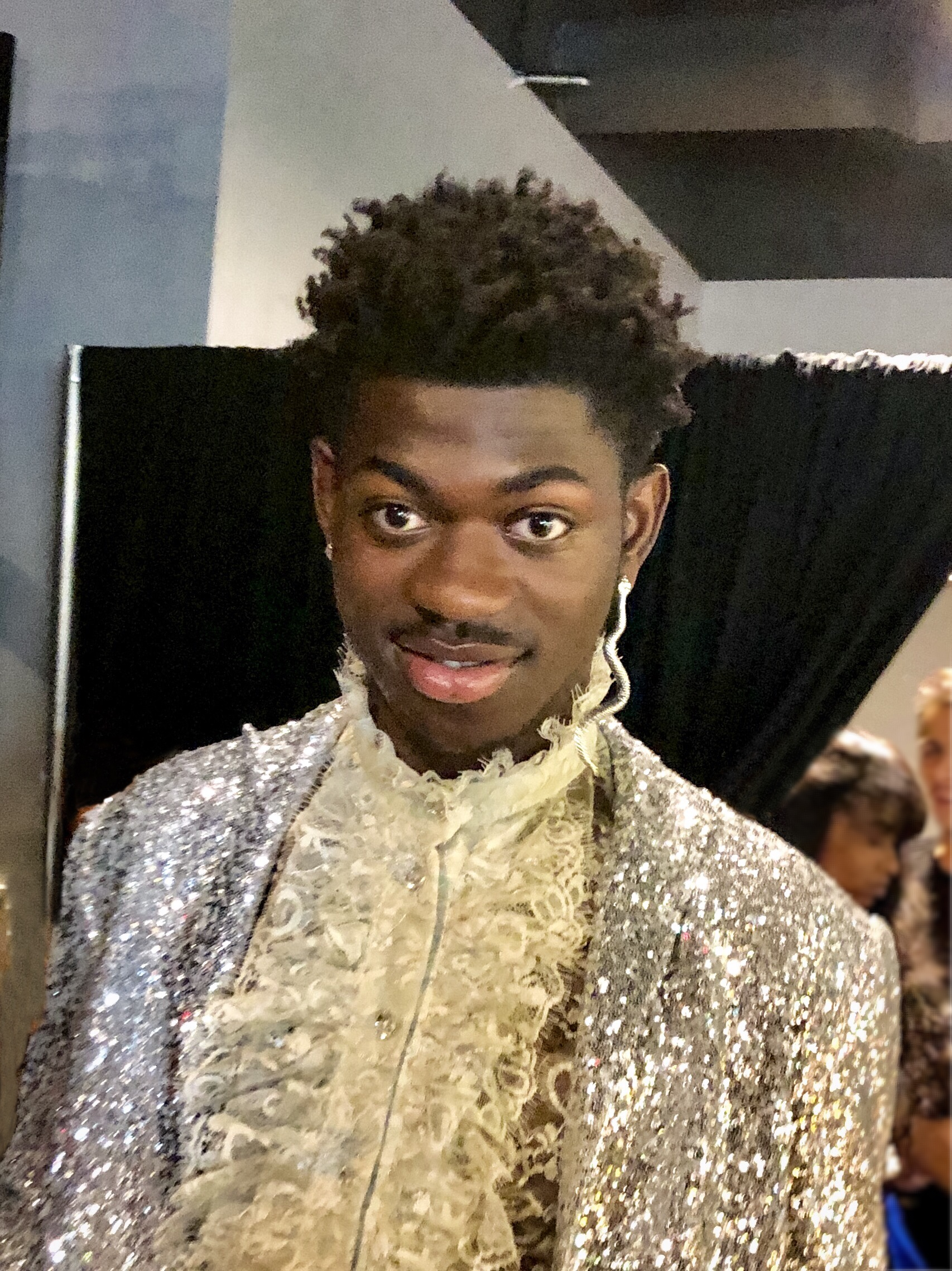
American rapper Lil Nas X's song "Old Town Road" was the top performing single of 2019

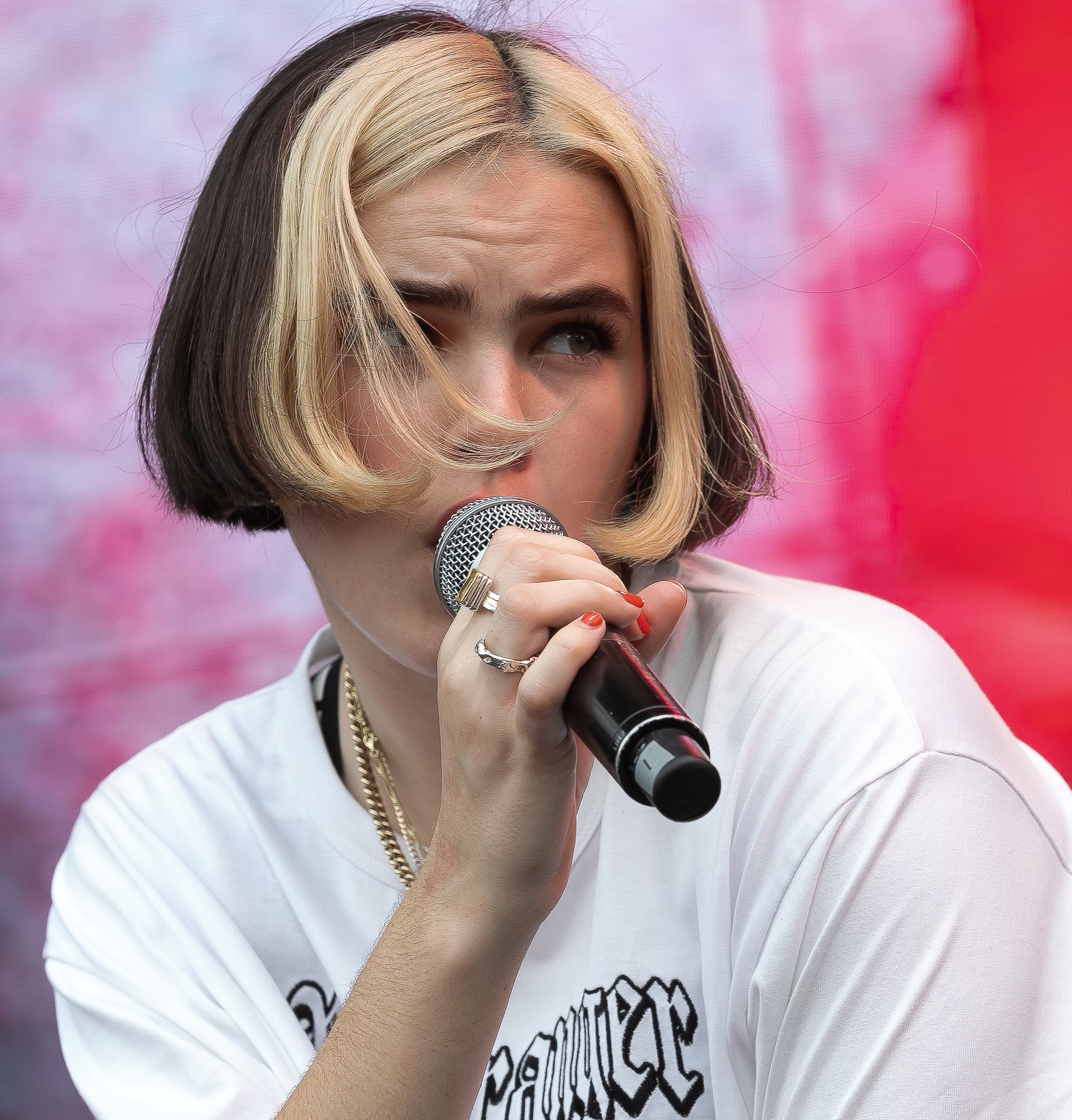
The most successful song by a New Zealand musician was "Soaked", sung by Benee

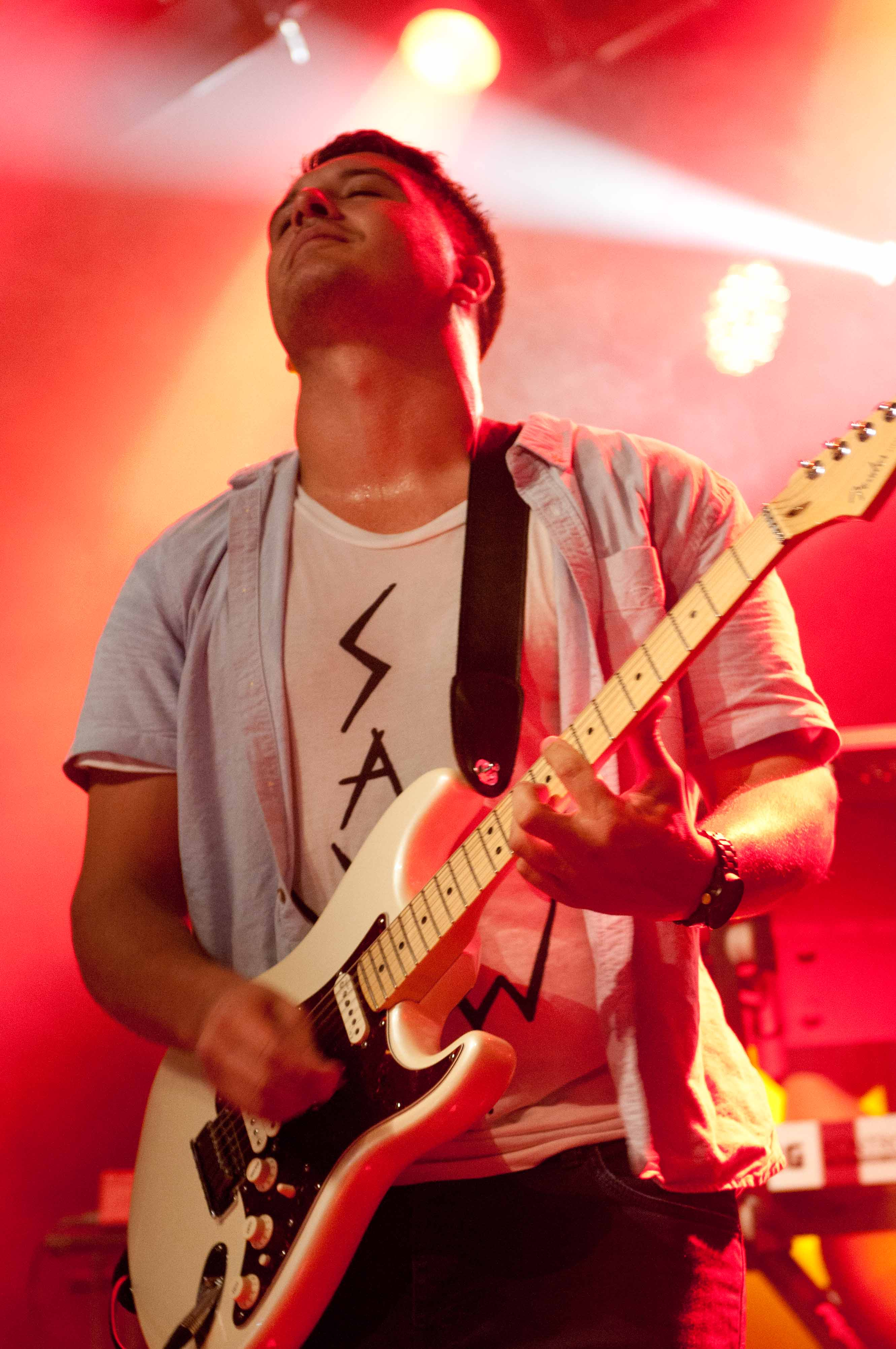
Half of the top 20 singles performed by New Zealand artists were songs by Six60

This is a list of the top-selling singles in New Zealand for 2019 from the Official New Zealand Music Chart's end-of-year chart, compiled by Recorded Music NZ. Recorded Music NZ also published a 2019 list for the top 20 singles released by New Zealand artists.

== Chart ==
Key
† – Song of New Zealand origin (Note: Whether or not a song is of New Zealand origin is determined by the Recorded Music NZ.)

Rank	Artist	Song
1	Lil Nas X	"Old Town Road"
2	Post Malone and Swae Lee	"Sunflower"
3	Billie Eilish	"Bad Guy"
4	Post Malone	"Wow."
5	Lewis Capaldi	"Someone You Loved"
6	Ed Sheeran and Justin Bieber	"I Don't Care"
7	Khalid and Disclosure	"Talk"
8	Tones and I	"Dance Monkey"
9	Shawn Mendes and Camila Cabello	"Señorita"
10	Lady Gaga and Bradley Cooper	"Shallow"
11	Ariana Grande	"7 Rings"
12	Halsey	"Without Me"
13	Khalid	"Better"
14	Benny Blanco featuring Halsey and Khalid	"Eastside"
15	Sam Smith and Normani	"Dancing with a Stranger"
16	George Ezra	"Shotgun"
17	Khalid	"Saturday Nights"
18	Ava Max	"Sweet but Psycho"
19	Ed Sheeran featuring Khalid	"Beautiful People"
20	Dominic Fike	"3 Nights"
21	Lizzo	"Truth Hurts"
22	Jonas Brothers	"Sucker"
23	Billie Eilish	"When the Party's Over"
24	Marshmello and Bastille	"Happier"
25	Benee	"Soaked"
26	Billie Eilish	"Bury a Friend"
27	Travis Scott featuring Drake	"Sicko Mode"
28	Post Malone	"Circles"
29	Ariana Grande	"Thank U, Next"
30	Six60	"The Greatest"
31	Loud Luxury featuring Brando	"Body"
32	J. Cole	"Middle Child"
33	Six60	"Vibes"
34	Ariana Grande	"Break Up with Your Girlfriend, I'm Bored"
35	Chris Brown featuring Drake	"No Guidance"
36	Lauv and Troye Sivan	"I'm So Tired..."
37	Lady Gaga	"Always Remember Us This Way"
38	5 Seconds of Summer	"Youngblood"
39	Billie Eilish featuring Khalid	"Lovely"
40	Lil Tecca	"Ransom"
41	Drax Project featuring Six60	"Catching Feelings"
42	Post Malone featuring Young Thug	"Goodbyes"
43	Ali Gatie	"It's You"
44	Drax Project featuring Hailee Steinfeld	"Woke Up Late"
45	Billie Eilish	"Wish You Were Gay"
46	Sam Smith	"How Do You Sleep?"
47	Blanco Brown	"The Git Up"
48	Dean Lewis	"Be Alright"
49	Shawn Mendes	"If I Can't Have You"
50	Alec Benjamin	"Let Me Down Slowly"

== Top 20 singles of 2019 by New Zealand artists ==
Rank	Artist	Song
1	Benee	"Soaked"
2	Six60	"Vibes"
3	Six60	"The Greatest"
4	Drax Project featuring Hailee Steinfeld	"Woke Up Late"
5	Drax Project featuring Six60	"Catching Feelings"
6	Six60	"Don't Give It Up"
7	Kings	"6 Figures"
8	Six60	"Don't Forget Your Roots"
9	Drax Project	"All This Time"
10	Six60	"Closer"
11	Sons of Zion	"Drift Away"
12	Mitch James	"Bright Blue Skies"
13	Six60	"Rivers"
14	Six60	"Only to Be"
15	Drax Project	"Toto"
16	Six60	"Please Don't Go"
17	Church & AP	"Ready or Not"
18	Six60	"Rolling Stone"
19	Mitch James	"Old News"
20	Sons of Zion	"Come Home"
