= New Zealand top 50 singles of 2017 =

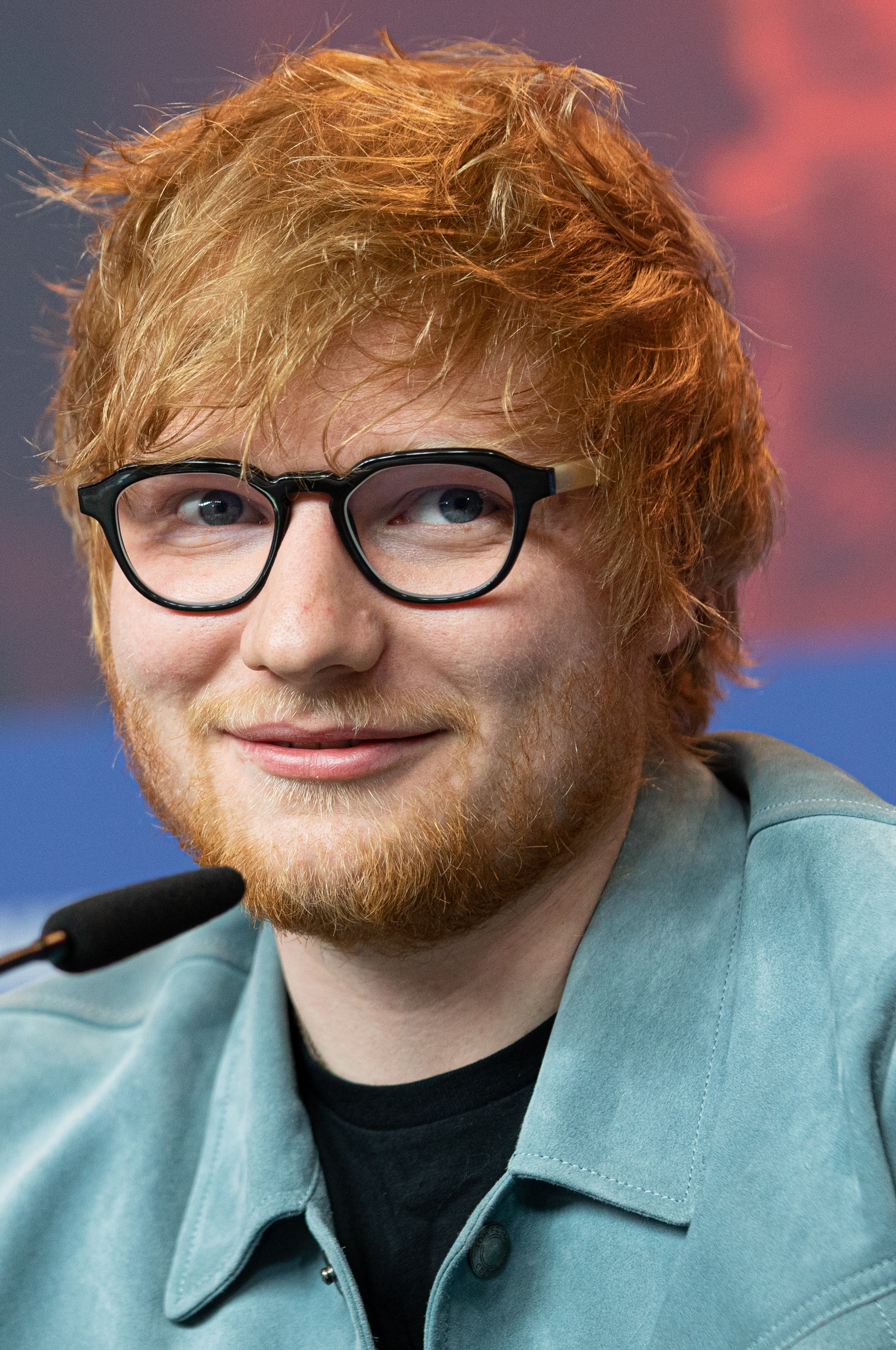
British singer Ed Sheeran released four of the top 10 songs of the year, including the top song "Shape of You"

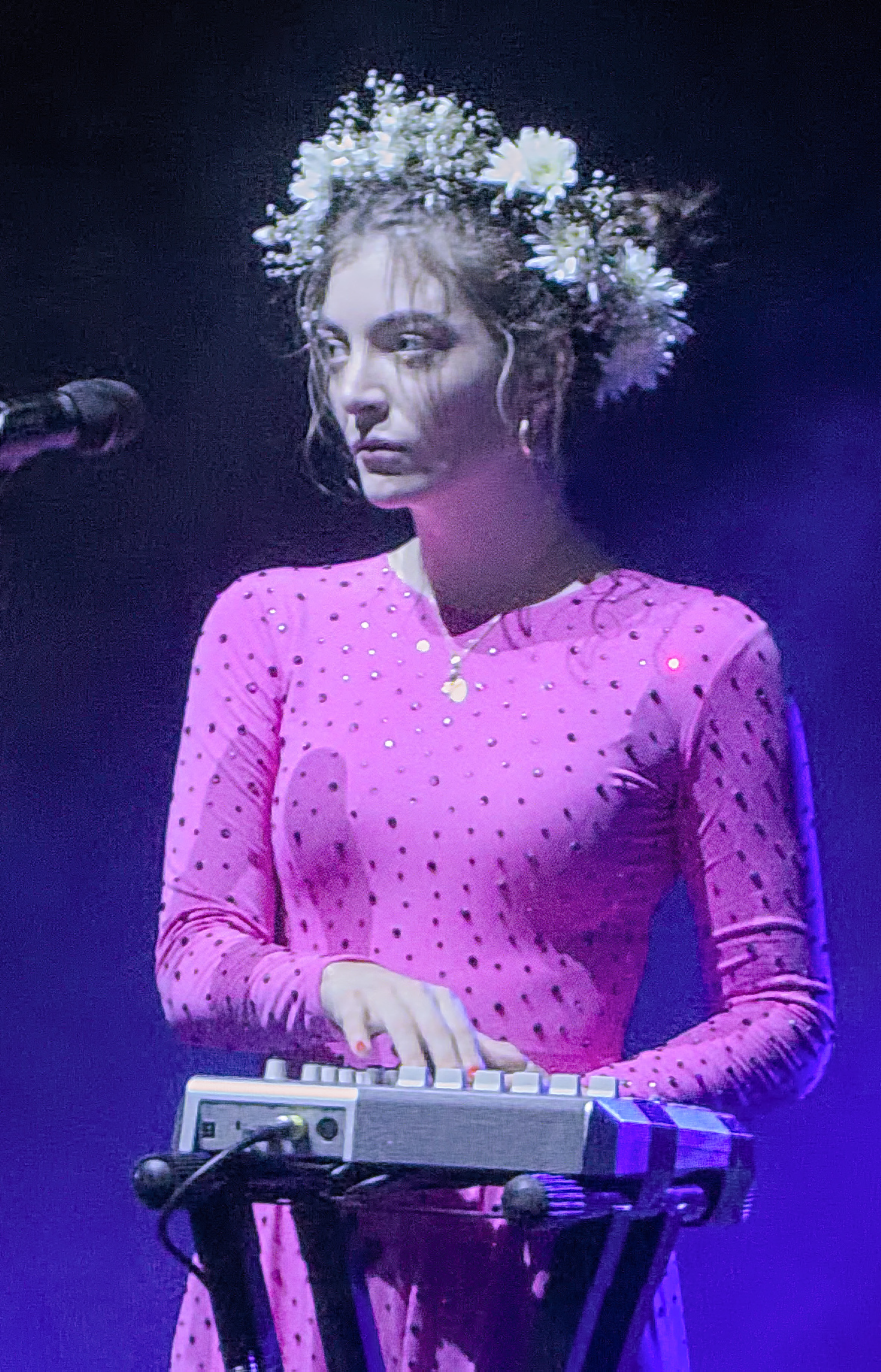
Six songs from New Zealand singer Lorde's album Melodrama featured among the top 20 New Zealand artists songs of the year

This is a list of the top-selling singles in New Zealand for 2017 from the Official New Zealand Music Chart's end-of-year chart, compiled by Recorded Music NZ. Recorded Music NZ also published list of the top 20 singles released by New Zealand artists for the same time period.

== Chart ==
Key
† – Song of New Zealand origin (Note: Whether or not a song is of New Zealand origin is determined by the Recorded Music NZ.)

| Rank | Artist | Song |
|---|---|---|
| 1 | Ed Sheeran | "Shape of You" |
| 2 | Luis Fonsi and Daddy Yankee featuring Justin Bieber | "Despacito (Remix)" |
| 3 | Kendrick Lamar | "Humble" |
| 4 | Ed Sheeran | "Castle on the Hill" |
| 5 | Ed Sheeran | "Perfect" |
| 6 | Bruno Mars | "That's What I Like" |
| 7 | Imagine Dragons | "Thunder" |
| 8 | DJ Khaled featuring Justin Bieber, Quavo, Chance the Rapper and Lil Wayne | "I'm the One" |
| 9 | The Chainsmokers and Coldplay | "Something Just Like This" |
| 10 | Ed Sheeran | "Galway Girl" |
| 11 | Khalid | "Location" |
| 12 | Post Malone featuring 21 Savage | "Rockstar" |
| 13 | French Montana featuring Swae Lee | "Unforgettable" |
| 14 | Khalid | "Young Dumb & Broke" |
| 15 | Dua Lipa | "New Rules" |
| 16 | Camila Cabello featuring Young Thug | "Havana" |
| 17 | DJ Khaled featuring Rihanna and Bryson Tiller | "Wild Thoughts" |
| 18 | Liam Payne featuring Quavo | "Strip That Down" |
| 19 | Post Malone featuring Quavo | "Congratulations" |
| 20 | Calvin Harris featuring Frank Ocean and Migos | "Slide" |
| 21 | Zayn and Taylor Swift | "I Don't Wanna Live Forever" |
| 22 | Kygo and Selena Gomez | "It Ain't Me" |
| 23 | Lorde | "Green Light" |
| 24 | Alessia Cara | "How Far I'll Go" |
| 25 | James Arthur | "Say You Won't Let Go" |
| 26 | Lil Uzi Vert | "XO Tour Llif3" |
| 27 | Macklemore featuring Skylar Grey | "Glorious" |
| 28 | Calvin Harris featuring Pharrell Williams, Katy Perry and Big Sean | "Feels" |
| 29 | Shawn Mendes | "There's Nothing Holdin' Me Back" |
| 30 | Logic featuring Alessia Cara and Khalid | "1-800-273-8255" |
| 31 | Jason Derulo featuring Nicki Minaj and Ty Dolla Sign | "Swalla" |
| 32 | Charlie Puth | "Attention" |
| 33 | Zedd and Alessia Cara | "Stay" |
| 34 | Clean Bandit featuring Sean Paul and Anne-Marie | "Rockabye" |
| 35 | Julia Michaels | "Issues" |
| 36 | Imagine Dragons | "Believer" |
| 37 | The Weeknd featuring Daft Punk | "I Feel It Coming" |
| 38 | Childish Gambino | "Redbone" |
| 39 | Future | "Mask Off" |
| 40 | Marshmello featuring Khalid | "Silence" |
| 41 | The Chainsmokers featuring Halsey | "Closer" |
| 42 | The Weeknd featuring Daft Punk | "Starboy" |
| 43 | Clean Bandit featuring Zara Larsson | "Symphony" |
| 44 | Niall Horan | "Slow Hands" |
| 45 | Pitbull featuring Stephen Marley | "Options" |
| 46 | Martin Garrix and Dua Lipa | "Scared to Be Lonely" |
| 47 | Demi Lovato | "Sorry Not Sorry" |
| 48 | Jonas Blue featuring William Singe | "Mama" |
| 49 | Post Malone | "I Fall Apart" |
| 50 | Starley | "Call on Me (Ryan Riback Remix)" |

== Top 20 singles by New Zealand artists ==
| Rank | Artist | Song |
|---|---|---|
| 1 | Lorde | "Green Light" |
| 2 | Six60 | "Don't Give It Up" |
| 3 | Lorde featuring Khalid, Post Malone and SZA | "Homemade Dynamite (Remix)" |
| 4 | Lorde | "Liability" |
| 5 | Kings | "Don't Worry Bout It" |
| 6 | Lorde | "Perfect Places" |
| 7 | Opetaia Foa'i and Lin-Manuel Miranda | "We Know the Way" |
| 8 | Six60 | "Closer" |
| 9 | Six60 | "Rivers" |
| 10 | Six60 | "Rolling Stone" |
| 11 | Sachi featuring Nika | "Shelter" |
| 12 | Jemaine Clement | "Shiny" |
| 13 | Lorde | "Sober" |
| 14 | Lorde | "The Louvre" |
| 15 | Maimoa | "Wairua" |
| 16 | Sons of Zion featuring Aaradhna | "Is That Enough" |
| 17 | Sons of Zion featuring Slip-On Stereo | "Now" |
| 18 | Drax Project featuring Hailee Steinfeld | "Woke Up Late" |
| 19 | Three Houses Down featuring General Fiyah | "Love and Affection" |
| 20 | Lorde | "Supercut" |
