= Aotearoa Music Award for Single of the Year =

Annual New Zealand music award

Single of the Year (Māori: Te Tino Waiata o te Tau) is an Aotearoa Music Award that honours New Zealand music artists for outstanding singles. For the purpose of the award, a single is defined as a song released separately from an album, either for sale or as a music video serviced to New Zealand television. The award was first awarded in 1973, following the Loxene Golden Disc award from 1965-1972. Lorde is the biggest winner in this category with five victories.

The award is sponsored by Spotify.

== Recipients ==
=== Loxene Golden Disc (1965-1972) ===
Year	Artist	Song	Award
1965	Ray Columbus & the Invaders	"Till We Kissed"	—N/a
1966	Maria Dallas	"Tumblin' Down"	—N/a
1967	Mr Lee Grant	"Thanks to You"	—N/a
1968	Allison Durbin	"I Have Loved me a Man"	—N/a
1969	Shane	"Saint Paul"	—N/a
1970	Craig Scott	"Let's Get a Little Sentimental"	Solo
1970	Hogsnort Rupert	"Pretty Girl"	Group and Golden Disc
1971	Craig Scott	"Smiley"	Solo and Golden Disc
1971	Chapta	"Say a Prayer"	Group
1972	Suzanne	"Sunshine Through a Prism"	Solo
1972	Creation	"Carolina"	Group and Golden Disc

=== Single of the Year (1973-current) ===
Year	Winner	Song	Other finalists	Ref.
1973	John Hanlon	"Damn the Dam"	—N/a	
1974	John Hanlon	"Is It Natural"	—N/a	
1975	Rockinghorse	"Through the Moonlight"	—N/a	
1976	No Single of the Year award given		—N/a	
1977	No awards held			
1978	Golden Harvest	"I Need Your Love"	—N/a	
1979	Th' Dudes	"Be Mine Tonight"	—N/a	
1980	Jon Stevens	Montego Bay	—N/a	
1981	Coup D'État	"Doctor, I Like Your Medicine"	Blam Blam Blam - "No Depression in New Zealand"; Screaming Meemees - "See Me Go"	
1982	Prince Tui Teka	"E Ipo"	—N/a	
1983	DD Smash	"Outlook For Thursday"	Monte Video and the Cassettes - "Shoop Shoop Diddy Wop Cumma Cumma Wang Dang"; Coconut Rough - "Sierra Leone"	
1984	The Narcs	"You Took Me Heart and Soul"	Pātea Māori Club and Dalvanius Prime - "Aku Raukura"; Dance Exponents - "I'll Say Goodbye (Even Though I'm Blue)"	
1985	Netherworld Dancing Toys	"For Today"	The Mockers - "Forever Tuesday Morning"; Peking Man - "Lift Your Head Up High"	
1986	Peking Man	"Room That Echoes"	Ardijah - "Give Me Your Number"; Pātea Māori Club featuring Dalvanius - "E Papa"	
1987	Dave Dobbyn	"You Oughta Be In Love"	Shona Laing - "(Glad I'm) Not a Kennedy"; The Chills - "Leather Jacket"	
1988	Holidaymakers	"Sweet Lovers"	Dave Dobbyn - "Love You Like I Should"; Tex Pistol/Rikki Morris - "Nobody Else"	
1989	Margaret Urlich	"Escaping"	Fan Club - "I Feel Love"; Double J and Twice the T/Ray Columbus - "She's a Mod/Mod Rap"	
1990	The Chills	"Heavenly Pop Hit"	Margaret Urlich - "Number One"; Ngaire - "To Sir With Love"	
1991	No awards held			
1992	The Exponents	"Why Does Love Do This To Me"	Headless Chickens - "Cruise Control"; Push Push - "Trippin'"	
1993	The Mutton Birds	"Nature"	Annie Crummer - "See What Love Can Do"; Greg Johnson Set - "Isabelle"	
1994	Headless Chickens	"Juice"/"Choppers"	Strawpeople - "Love Explodes"; Straitjacket Fits - "Cat Inna Can"	
1995	Purest Form	"Message to My Girl"	3 The Hard Way - "Hip Hop Holiday"; Headless Chickens - "George"; Sisters Underground - "In the Neighbourhood"; Supergroove - "Can't Get Enough"	
1996	OMC	"How Bizarre"	D-Faction - "Down in the Boondocks"; Herbs - "French Letter '95"; Jan Hellriegel - "Manic (Is a State of Mind)"; The Exponents - "La La Lulu"; Strawpeople - "Sweet Disorder"	
1997	DLT featuring Che Fu	"Chains"	Bic Runga - "Drive"; Garageland - "Beelines to Heaven"; Strawpeople - "Taller Than God"; The Mutton Birds - "She's Been Talking"	
1998	Bic Runga	"Sway"	Shihad - "Home Again"; The Feelers - "Pressure Man"; Darcy Clay - "Jesus I Was Evil"; Moizna - "Just Another Day"	
1999	Che Fu	"Scene III"	The Feelers - "Venus"; Ardijah - "Love So Right"	
2000	Stellar	"Violent"	AKA Brown - "Something I Need"; Shihad - "My Mind's Sedate"; The Mutton Birds - "Pulled Along By Love"; Breathe - "Landslide"	
2001	Fur Patrol	"Lydia"	Eye TV - "One Day Ahead"; Shihad - "Pacifier"; Tadpole - "Alright"; Zed - "Renegade Fighter"	
2002	Che Fu	"Fade Away"	Aaria - "Kei A Wai Ra Te Kupu"; Anika Moa - "Youthful"; Nesian Mystik - "Nesian Style"; Salmonella Dub - "Love Your Ways"	
2003	Goodshirt	"Sophie"	Che Fu - "Misty Frequencies"; Bic Runga - "Get Some Sleep"; Anika Moa - "Falling In Love Again"; Nesian Mystik - "It's On"	
2004	Scribe	"Stand Up"	Brooke Fraser - "Lifeline; Dimmer - "Getting What You Give"; Goldenhorse - "Maybe Tomorrow"; Goodshirt - "Buck It Up"	
2005	Breaks Co-Op	"The Otherside"	Brooke Fraser - "Arithmetic"; Dave Dobbyn - "Welcome Home"; Finn Brothers - "Won't Give In"; P-Money – "Stop the Music"	
2006	Pluto	"Long White Cross"	Bic Runga - "Winning Arrow"; Goldenhorse - "Out of the Moon"; Mt Raskil Preservation Society featuring Hollie Smith - "Bathe In the River"; The Feelers - "Stand Up"	
2007	Evermore	"Light Surrounding You"	Brooke Fraser - "Deciphering Me"; Liam Finn - "Second Chance"; Opshop - "Maybe"; The Tutts - "K"	
2008	Opshop	"One Day"	Liam Finn - "Gather to the Chapel"; Shihad - "One Will Hear the Other"; The Phoenix Foundation - "Bright Grey"; Tiki Taane - "Always on My Mind"	
2009	Ladyhawke	"My Delirium"	Midnight Youth - "All On Our Own"; P-Money featuring Vince Harder - "Everything"; Smashproof featuring Gin Wigmore - "Brother"; Kids of 88 - "My House"	
2010	Kids of 88	"Just a Little Bit"	Dane Rumble – "Cruel"; Gin Wigmore – "Oh My"; J. Williams featuring Scribe – "You Got Me"; The Phoenix Foundation – "Buffalo"	
2011	The Naked and Famous	"Young Blood"	Avalanche City – "Love Love Love"; Ladi6 – "Like Water"; Brooke Fraser – "Something in the Water"; Six60 – "Rise Up 2.0"	
2012	Six60	"Don't Forget Your Roots"	Annah Mac – "Girl in Stilettos"; Gin Wigmore – "Black Sheep"; Kimbra featuring Mark Foster and A-Trak – "Warrior"; The Adults – "Nothing To Lose"	
2013	Lorde	"Royals"	Aaradhna – "Wake Up"; Shapeshifter – "In Colour"; Stan Walker – "Take It Easy"; Unknown Mortal Orchestra – "So Good At Being In Trouble"	
2014	Lorde	"Team"	Broods - "Bridges"; David Dallas - "Runnin'"; The Naked and Famous - "Hearts Like Ours"; Ladi6 - "Diamonds"	
2015	Lorde	"Yellow Flicker Beat"	Avalanche City – "Inside Out"; Marlon Williams – "Dark Child"; Six60 – "White Lines"; Unknown Mortal Orchestra – "Multi-Love"	
2016	Broods	"Free"	Aaradhna - "Brown Girl"; Kings - "Don't Worry Bout It"; Maala - "Kind of Love"; Shapeshifter - "Stars"; The Naked and Famous - "Higher"	
2017	Lorde	"Green Light"	David Dallas – "Fit In"; Ladi6 – "Royal Blue"; Maala – "In My Head"; SWIDT – "Player Of The Day"; Theia – "Roam"	
2018	Drax Project	"Woke Up Late"	Mitch James – "21"; Robinson – "Nothing to Regret"; Six60 – "Don't Give It Up"; Sons of Zion – "Drift Away"; Unknown Mortal Orchestra – "Hunnybee"	
2019	Benee	"Soaked"	Aldous Harding – "The Barrell"; The Beths – "Little Death"; Church & AP – "Ready or Not"; Drax Project – "All This Time"; Six60 – "The Greatest"	
2020	Benee	"Supalonely"	Drax Project featuring Six60 – "Catching Feelings"; Jawsh 685 – "Savage Love (Laxed – Siren Beat)"; L.A.B. – "In the Air"; Six60 – "Please Don't Go"; Troy Kingi – "All Your Ships Have Sailed"	
2021	L.A.B.	"Why Oh Why"	Harper Finn – "Dance Away These Days"; Lorde – "Solar Power"; Six60 – "All She Wrote"; Teeks – "Remember Me"; Troy Kingi – "Sleep (Slumber)"	
2022	L.A.B.	"Mr Reggae"	The Beths – "Silence Is Golden"; Reb Fountain – "Lacuna"; Ka Hao featuring Rob Ruha – "35"; Rob Ruha – "That's Where I'll Be"; Marlon Williams – "My Boy"	
2023	No awards held			
2024	Avantdale Bowling Club	"Friday Night @ The Liquor Store"	Aaradhna – "SHE"; Corrella – "Blue Eyed Māori"; COTERIE – "Always Beside You (ft. Six60)"; Fazerdaze – "Bigger"; Home Brew – "Run It Back"; Kaylee Bell – "Boots 'N All"; L.A.B. – "Take It Away"; Marlon Williams – "Don't Go Back"; Mermaidens – "I like to be alone"; Stan Walker – "I AM"; The Beths – "Watching The Credits"	
2025	Lorde	"Girl So Confusing" – Charli XCX feat. Lorde	Cassie Henderson – "Seconds to Midnight"; CHAII – "We Be Killing It"; Fazerdaze – "Cherry Pie"; Georgia Lines – "The Letter"; JessB – "Power"; Kaylee Bell – "Cowboy Up"; Reb Fountain – ‘Come Down’; MOKOMOKAI – ‘KUPE’ feat. MELODOWNZ; Stan Walker – ‘Māori Ki Te Ao’; Theia – ‘BALDH3AD!’; Troy Kingi – ‘Silicone Booby Trap	
