= Lady Shaka =

New Zealand DJ

Shakaiah Perez (born 29 July, 1996), known professionally as Lady Shaka, is a New Zealand DJ who has performed internationally, including multiple sets for online music broadcaster Boiler Room.

== Personal life ==
Born in New Zealand, Lady Shaka currently resides in the United Kingdom. She is of Māori, Tahitian, Cape Verdean, Tokelauan, and Samoan descent.

== Career ==
Starting initially in commercial dance, Lady Shaka was a member of Parris Goebel’s Royal Family dance group, under whom she won a world hip-hop title when she was aged 14.

In 2019 Lady Shaka founded "Pulotu Underworld", a Pacific focused music collective that created London's first ever Pacific club night. Lady Shaka has also been involved with Ngāti Rānana, a London-based kapa haka group. She has performed in Melbourne and Berlin for online broadcaster Boiler Room. She also performed in Auckland in collaboration with QTBIPOC collective FILTH, a performance notable for her inclusion of poi.

She has criticised the gentrification of areas within Auckland, and stated that one of the goals of her work is to "re-indigenise" spaces, noting that "the 1960s and 1990s K Road and Ponsonby were known as heavily Māori and Pacific-populated areas which are now gentrified suburban areas that make up central Tāmaki Makaurau.” She has organised events with this as a focus, such as the 2023 Māori and Pasifika-focused DJ event "Hoki Whenua Mai (Land Back)".

As part of Boiler Room's first Pacific-based event in Rarotonga Lady Shaka held a series of DJing workshops, alongside Pulotu Underworld, with the goal of nurturing local talent and providing access to international DJs that might not otherwise be possible for people in the Pacific. She has expressed the desire to see more DJing events in the region in the future, noting that places like Micronesia, Melanesia, and The Philippines were often left out of such events.

In 2024 Lady Shaka released her first single "E Tu", sampling "Kei A Wai Ra Te Kupu" by New Zealand band Aaria. She felt the te reo Māori lyrics, meaning “let's move together and stand up”, were reflective of the current political landscape in New Zealand.

== Recognition ==
- Creative New Zealand Arts Culture and Creativity award, 2023
