= Six60 (EP) =

2017 extended play by Six60

EP by Six60
- Released: 17 November 2017
- Genre: Pop rock
- Length: 20:04
- Label: Massive Entertainment
- Producer: Marlon Gerbes; Matiu Walters; Printz Board

Six60 chronology
Six60 (2015)	Six60 (2017)	Six60 (2019)

Singles from Six60
- 1. "Don't Give It Up" Released: 13 October 2017; 2. "Rivers" Released: 20 October 2017; 3. "Closer" Released: 27 October 2017; 4. "Rolling Stone" Released: 3 November 2017; 5. "Vibes" Released: 10 November 2017; 6. "Up There" Released: 17 November 2017

Six60 is the third extended play by New Zealand band Six60. The release was a wide-scale commercial success in New Zealand, debuting at number two on the New Zealand albums chart, and being one of the top-performing releases in New Zealand between 2017 and 2021.

== Production ==
The album was recorded at HQ, the band's newly created studio in Auckland, New Zealand.

== Release ==
The songs from the extended play were released weekly as singles, beginning on 13 October 2017 with "Don't Give It Up" and ending with "Up There" on 17 November, the release date of the EP. After the release of the EP, the band embarked on The New Waves World, a world tour which included dates in Europe, finishing on 17 March 2018 in Whangārei. In 2022, the album was certified six times Platinum, after selling over 90,000 units.

== Critical reception ==
The New Zealand Herald gave Six60 EP four stars out of five. The reviewers felt that the EP was a positive sonic change for the band, distancing themselves from reggae-influenced rock in favour of "pop-soul summer jams", a move that "feels like it's become more natural to them". The reviewers also felt that the influence of Pharrell Williams, who the band had recorded with in the past, was felt on the record due to the songs' minimalism.

At the 2018 New Zealand Music Awards, the Six60 EP won the band the Best Group and Highest Selling Album awards, while the single "Don’t Give It Up" won the Highest Selling Single and Radio Airplay Record of the Year awards.

== Track listing ==
All tracks are written by Chris Mac, Eli Paewai, James Fraser, Marlon Gerbes, Matiu Walters, Printz Board.

Six60 track listing
No.	Title	Length
1.	"Don't Give It Up"	3:21
2.	"Rivers"	3:24
3.	"Closer"	3:16
4.	"Rolling Stone"	2:56
5.	"Vibes"	3:31
6.	"Up There"	3:28
Total length:		20:04

== Credits and personnel ==
- Neil Baldock – engineer
- Leslie Braithwaite – mixing
- Andrew Chavez – engineer
- Ji Fraser – guitar, songwriter
- Marlon Gerbes – keyboards, guitar, producer, songwriter
- Dmitry Gorodetsky – bass guitar (1)
- David Kutch – mastering engineer
- Chris Mac – bass guitar, songwriter
- Eli Paewai – drums, songwriter
- Printz Board – producer, songwriter
- Matiu Walters – vocals, producer, songwriter

== Charts ==
=== Weekly charts ===
Weekly chart performance for Six60
Chart (2017)	Peak position
New Zealand Albums (RMNZ)	2

=== Year-end charts ===
Year-end chart performance for Six60
Chart (2017)	Position
New Zealand Albums (RMNZ)	33
Chart (2018)	Position
New Zealand Albums (RMNZ)	3
Chart (2019)	Position
New Zealand Albums (RMNZ)	6
Chart (2020)	Position
New Zealand Albums (RMNZ)	6
Chart (2021)	Position
New Zealand Albums (RMNZ)	13
Chart (2022)	Position
New Zealand Albums (RMNZ)	17

== Certifications and sales ==
Certifications and sales for Six60
Region	Certification	Certified units/sales
New Zealand (RMNZ)	7× Platinum	105,000^{‡}
^{‡} Sales+streaming figures based on certification alone.

== Release history ==
Release dates and formats for Six60
Region	Date	Format(s)	Label(s)	Ref.=
New Zealand	17 November 2017	CD; digital download; streaming	Massive Entertainment	
