= Six60 (2015 album) =

Studio album by Six60
- Released: 27 February 2015
- Recorded: 2014
- Length: 40:21
- Label: Massive
- Producer: Six60, Printz Board

Six60 chronology
Six60 (2011)	Six60 (2015)	Six60 (2017)

Singles from Six60
- 1. "Special" Released: 10 November 2014; 2. "So High" Released: 27 February 2015; 3. "White Lines" Released: 4 May 2015; 4. "Purple" Released: 2015; 5. "Stay Together" Released: 2015; 6. "Exhale" Released: 2015

Six60 is the second studio album released by New Zealand rock band Six60. It was released on 27 February 2015 through New Zealand label Massive Entertainment. It debuted at number one on the New Zealand Albums Chart and was certified Gold in its first week. All of the songs on the album made an appearance on the New Zealand Artists Singles Chart in its first week of release due to strong overall sales. The album was later released in a standard edition or a deluxe edition with additional tracks.

== Singles ==
- "Special" was released as the album's lead single on 10 November 2014. It debuted and peaked at number one on the New Zealand Singles Chart and was certified 2× Platinum by Recorded Music NZ.
- "So High" was originally released as a promotional single on 22 December 2014. It was promoted to radio and released as the second official single on 27 February 2015 to accompany the release of the album. The song peaked at number ten on the New Zealand Singles Chart, and was later certified Platinum.
- "White Lines" was released as the third single from the album on 4 May 2015. The song peaked at number five on the New Zealand Singles Chart, and has been certified Platinum.

=== Other songs ===
- "Purple", despite not being released as an official single or making an appearance on the national singles chart, has reached number three on the New Zealand Artist Singles Chart and has been certified Gold by Recorded Music NZ.
- "Stay Together"
- "Exhale"

== Track listing ==
Six60 track listing
No.	Title	Length
1.	"FTW (Intro)"	1:13
2.	"Stay Together"	3:47
3.	"White Lines"	3:09
4.	"Mothers Eyes"	3:41
5.	"So High"	3:45
6.	"Don't Go Changing"	3:16
7.	"Special"	3:25
8.	"Exhale"	3:04
9.	"Find My Way"	4:14
10.	"Purple"	3:41
11.	"Die For"	3:10
12.	"Last Ones Left (Outro)"	3:56
Total length:		40:21

Deluxe edition bonus tracks
No.	Title	Length
13.	"Too Much"	3:34
14.	"Fade to Grey"	4:04
15.	"Marks on the Wall"	4:21
16.	"Mine"	3:18
Total length:		55:38

== Charts ==
=== Weekly charts ===
Weekly chart performance for Six60
Chart (2015)	Peak position
New Zealand Albums (RMNZ)	1

=== Year-end charts ===
Year-end chart performance for Six60
Chart (2015)	Position
New Zealand Albums (RMNZ)	6
Chart (2016)	Position
New Zealand Albums (RMNZ)	11
Chart (2017)	Position
New Zealand Albums (RMNZ)	18
Chart (2018)	Position
New Zealand Albums (RMNZ)	12
Chart (2019)	Position
New Zealand Albums (RMNZ)	12
Chart (2020)	Position
New Zealand Albums (RMNZ)	11
Chart (2021)	Position
New Zealand Albums (RMNZ)	15
Chart (2022)	Position
New Zealand Albums (RMNZ)	27

== Certifications ==
Region	Certification	Certified units/sales
New Zealand (RMNZ)	9× Platinum	135,000^{^}
^{^} Shipments figures based on certification alone.

== Release history ==
Release history and formats for Six60
Region	Date	Format
New Zealand	27 February 2015	CD; digital download
