= Castle Street, Dunedin =

Street in Dunedin, New Zealand

Castle Street
- Interactive map of Castle Street
- Maintained by: NZ Transport Agency, Dunedin City Council
- Location: Dunedin, New Zealand
- Postal code: 9016
- South end: High Street/Stuart Street, central Dunedin
- North end: Duke Street/Brook Street, Dunedin North
- East: Leith Street
- West: Cumberland Street

The three blocks of Castle Street which are part of State Highway 1 are marked in blue on this map of central Dunedin, terminating at the Anzac Square junction with Lower Stuart Street (6).

Castle Street is a major street in the city of Dunedin, New Zealand. The street runs in a north-north-east direction from Stuart Street outside Dunedin Railway Station to the southern end of the Dunedin Botanic Garden, and is bisected into two distinct parts by the University of Otago campus.

== Southern section: State Highway ==
The southern part of Castle Street between Stuart Street and Frederick Street is part of State Highway 1, and is a two-laned one-way street, carrying southbound traffic while the parallel Cumberland Street to the west carries northbound traffic. The NZ Transport Agency, in conjunction with Dunedin City Council, is proposing to install protected bike lanes on the one-way pair, replacing the painted cycle lanes.

The central part between Frederick Street and Saint David Street was mostly closed in the 1970s to allow expatiation of the University of Otago campus. A small cul-de-sac south of Albany Street that was formerly part of Castle Street was renamed Ethel Benjamin Place. At this point the State Highway moves one block to the west, initially carried by two short stretches of curved road.

== Northern section: Student Quarter ==
The northern section of Castle Street, also known as Castle Street North, runs for 600 metres (2,000 ft) from Saint David Street to Duke Street in Dunedin North.

South of Dundas Street, most of the buildings are owned by the University of Otago, being mainly offices and university-owned rental properties. It is also home to Selwyn College.

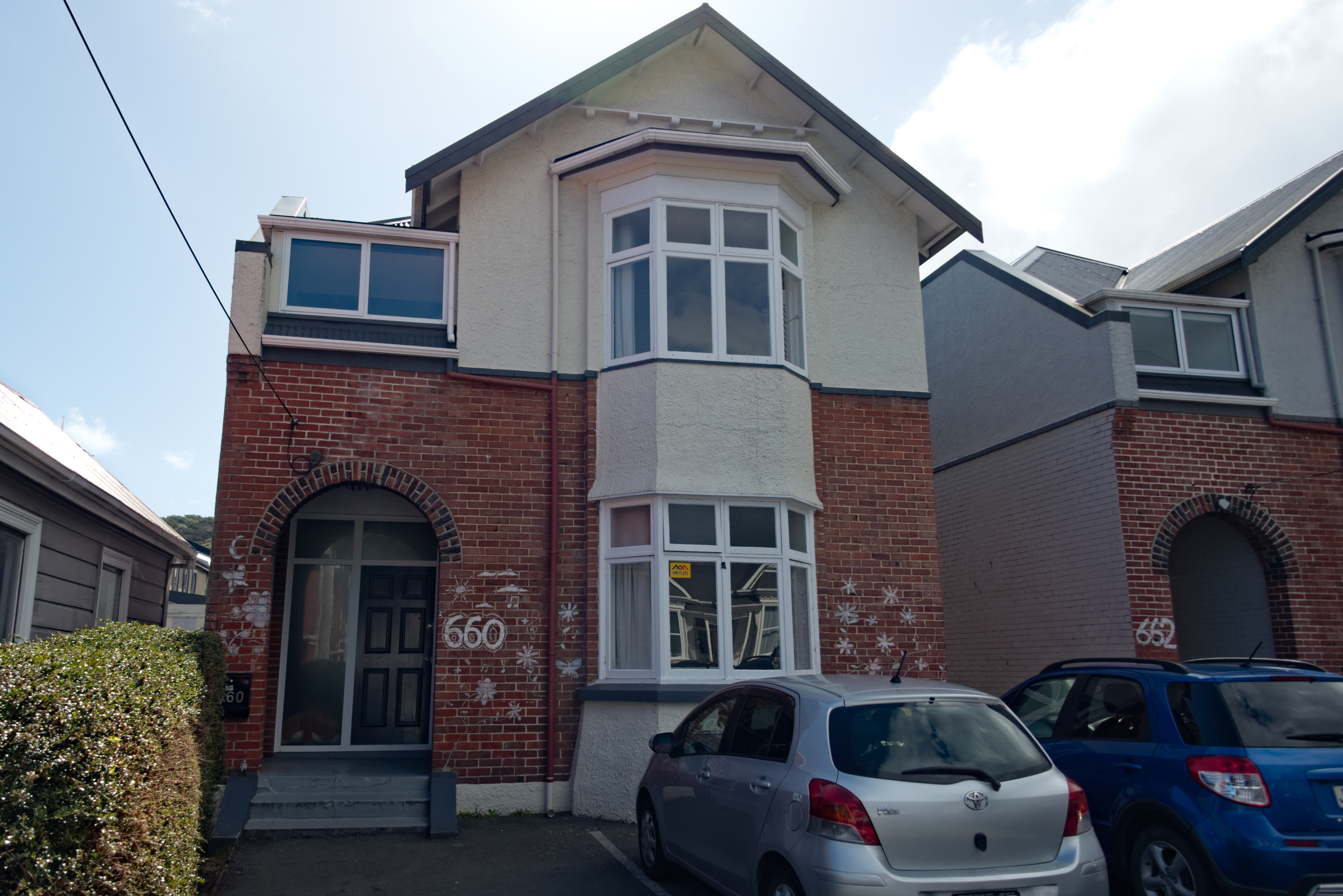
660 Castle St, photographed in 2026

North of Dundas Street, the street is dominated by rental properties occupied by students from the university and Otago Polytechnic. Most houses along the street are of early 20th century construction, dotted by modern infill housing. This section is considered the main street of Dunedin's student quarter, and has been home to many student riots. Some of the founding members of New Zealand rock band Six60 notably lived at 660 Castle St during their university years, and the house is now owned by the band members. The band named their fourth studio album Castle St after the location.
