= Fade Away (Six60 song) =

2020 single by Six60

Single by Six60
- Released: 13 November 2020
- Genre: Pop
- Length: 3:32
- Label: Epic, Massive
- Songwriters: Jacob Dutton; James Ho; Marlon Gerbes; Matiu Walters; Paul Shelton
- Producer: Malay

Six60 singles chronology
"Sundown" (2020)	"Fade Away" (2020)	"All She Wrote" (2021)

Music video
- "Fade Away (Lyric Video)" on YouTube

"Fade Away" is a song by New Zealand band Six60, released as a single in November 2020, during promotion for the band's documentary film Six60: Till the Lights Go Out. The song was the most played track on New Zealand radio by a domestic artist in 2021.

== Background and composition ==
The song was written and produced by the band members in collaboration with American music producers Jake One and Malay, and is a pop ballad that features elements of hip-hop.

== Release and promotion ==
"Fade Away" was released as a single on 13 November 2020. The song's release coincided with the world premiere of band's documentary Six60: Till the Lights Go Out (2020). After the release of the track, the band performed Six60 Saturdays, a summer tour of New Zealand held across six dates in January and February 2021.

At the 2021 Aotearoa Music Awards, "Fade Away" was recognised as the song most played on radio for the year.

== Credits and personnel ==
Credits adapted from Tidal.

- Jacob Dutton – songwriting
- Marlon Gerbes – songwriting
- James Ho – production, songwriting
- Dave Kutch – mastering engineer
- Raul Lopez – mixer
- Paul Shelton – songwriting
- Six60 – performer
- Matiu Walters – songwriting

== Charts ==
Chart (2020)	Peak position
New Zealand (Recorded Music NZ)	9

=== Year-end charts ===
Chart (2021)	Position
New Zealand (Recorded Music NZ)	33

== Certifications ==
Certifications for "Fade Away"
Region	Certification	Certified units/sales
New Zealand (RMNZ)	3× Platinum	90,000^{‡}
^{‡} Sales+streaming figures based on certification alone.
