= All She Wrote (Six60 song) =

2021 single by Six60

Single by Six60
- Released: 26 February 2021
- Genre: Pop
- Length: 3:18
- Label: Epic, Massive
- Songwriters: Jacob Dutton; Marlon Gerbes; James Ho; Paul Shelton
- Producer: Malay

Six60 singles chronology
| "Fade Away" (2020) | "All She Wrote" (2021) | "Pepeha" (2021) |

Music video
- "All She Wrote" on YouTube

"All She Wrote" is a song by New Zealand band Six60, released as a single in February 2021, during their Six60 Saturdays tour. The song was a hit for the band, reaching number one in New Zealand.

== Background and composition ==
The band first wrote the chords for the song on an old guitar, which only had three remaining strings. The song was produced by Malay, and the song's lyrics were inspired by acceptance.

== Release and promotion ==
The song was debuted live on 16 January 2021 during the band's first performance of the Six60 Saturdays tour of New Zealand, and was released just prior to the final performance of the tour in Hamilton.

== Music video ==
The song's music video features a number of cameos by New Zealand celebrities, including sportspeople Dan Carter and Joseph Parker, politician Chlöe Swarbrick, musicians Dave Dobbyn and Mitch James, and newscasters Mike McRoberts and Samantha Hayes. The video's concept was inspired by the idea of musicians testing their music through car speakers before release, and is an homage to "How Bizarre" (1995) by OMC.

== Critical reception ==
The song was nominated for the 2021 Aotearoa Music Award for Single of the Year award.

== Credits and personnel ==
Credits adapted from Tidal.

- Jacob Dutton – songwriting
- Marlon Gerbes – songwriting
- James Ho – production, songwriting
- Dave Kutch – mastering engineer
- Paul Shelton – songwriting
- Six60 – performer

== Charts ==
| Chart (2021) | Peak position |
|---|---|
| New Zealand (Recorded Music NZ) | 1 |

=== Year-end charts ===
| Chart (2021) | Position |
|---|---|
| New Zealand (Recorded Music NZ) | 18 |

== Certifications ==
Certifications for "All She Wrote"
| Region | Certification | Certified units/sales |
|---|---|---|
| New Zealand (RMNZ) | 4× Platinum | 120,000^{‡} |
^{‡} Sales+streaming figures based on certification alone.
