= Nothing to Regret =

Single by Robinson
- Released: 22 February 2018
- Genre: Pop
- Length: 3:28
- Label: Dryden Street; Ministry of Sound; Sony; Universal
- Songwriters: Allie Crystal; Larzz Principato; Anna Mary Robinson
- Producers: Sam de Jong; Joel Little

Robinson singles chronology
"Crave You" (2017)	"Nothing to Regret" (2018)	"Don't Trust Myself" (2018)

Music video
- "Nothing to Regret" on YouTube

"Nothing to Regret" is a song by New Zealand singer-songwriter Robinson. It was first released on 22 February 2018 by Universal Music Group in Australia and New Zealand. The song was written by Robinson, Allie Crystal, and Larzz Principato, while the production was handled by Sam de Jong and Joel Little. Written during a trip to New York City, "Nothing to Regret" is a mid-tempo pop song which details how one should enjoy spending time with their friends. Robinson noticed how different her schedule was from her friends', which she took as inspiration for the track.

"Nothing to Regret" garnered positive reviews from music critics, who praised its sound and production. The song reached the top thirty in Australia and New Zealand, receiving a platinum certification in the former by the Australian Recording Industry Association (ARIA) and a double platinum one by Recorded Music NZ (RMNZ) in the latter. A music video directed by Morgan Gruer was released on 23 February 2018. It depicts Robinson spending time alone and being surrounded by other people at a party in interspersed shots. Robinson performed the song several times in 2018. "Nothing to Regret" received nominations at the 2018 APRA Silver Scroll Awards and 2018 New Zealand Music Awards.

== Background and composition ==
"Nothing to Regret" (2019)
A 21-second sample of "Nothing to Regret".

Anna Robinson, better known as Robinson, released her debut single "Don't You Forget About Me" in 2017 to critical acclaim. In February 2018, she was signed to Universal Music Publishing Australia, with "Nothing to Regret" being the song that "solidified [Robinson's] deal". Universal Music Group released the song on 22 February 2018 in Australia and New Zealand. A day later, it was issued for digital download and streaming by Dryden Street in various countries. Dryden Street also released a remix EP and an acoustic version of "Nothing to Regret" in June 2018. On 13 July 2018, Ministry of Sound and Sony Music sent the song to Italian radio stations.

"Nothing to Regret" is a mid-tempo pop song. Robinson co-wrote it with Allie Crystal and Larzz Principato, while Sam de Jong and Joel Little produced it. She revealed that the song was written while on a trip to New York City. According to Robinson, "Nothing to Regret" was inspired by the difference she noticed in her schedule and her friends', who went to university and worked. She stated that the song is about "having a really good time" while forgetting any misfortunes and "making the most of that time that you do have with friends". Robinson disclosed to Refinery29 that in spite of its cheerful tone, the track also has "a lot of darker undertones". George Fenwick of The New Zealand Herald noted that "Nothing to Regret" details "the unashamed desire to unravel one's worries over a weekend of dancing" and that it contains "clean melodies and grand swells of emotion". Kaitlin Reilly, writing for Refinery29, affirmed that the track is "an ode to staying up late with your best friends, sans any regrets".

== Reception ==
"Nothing to Regret" received positive reviews from music critics. Idolator's Mike Wass deemed it "anthemic" and "breathtaking". Fenwick considered "Nothing to Regret" to be "an elated burst of pop perfection". Writing for NME, Hannah Mylrea stated that: "All subtle builds and triumphant climaxes, with a huge, emotive earworm of a chorus (à la fellow Kiwi Lorde), it’s makes for a heady sugar rush." Liz Elias of Australian radio station Nova 96.9 called it "a bop". Australian music publication Music Feeds deemed the song a "fresh pop jam", while New Zealand radio station The Hits declared "it's no surprise the song is so good".

In Robinson's native New Zealand, "Nothing to Regret" reached number 29 and spent ten weeks on the Official New Zealand Music Chart. It later achieved a double platinum certification from Recorded Music NZ (RMNZ). The song attained similar commercial success in Australia, where it peaked at number 27, spent twelve weeks on the ARIA Top 50 Singles chart and was certified platinum by the Australian Recording Industry Association (ARIA). "Nothing to Regret" was shortlisted in July 2018 as one of the 20 songs in the run for the 2018 APRA Silver Scroll Award, although the award ultimately went to Marlon Williams's "Nobody Gets What They Want Anymore" (2018). "Nothing to Regret" was also nominated for Vodafone Single of the Year at the 2018 New Zealand Music Awards, but lost to Drax Project's "Woke Up Late" (2017).

== Music video and live performances ==
The music video for the song was released on 23 February 2018 and was directed by Morgan Gruer. It was filmed in Los Angeles. Robinson stated after the song was finished, it was sent to different companies "to come up with a treatment" and that Gruer and her team's idea was "everything [Robinson] had envisioned [the video] to be". Half of the video shows Robinson singing and dancing in a room by herself, while the other half depicts her being dressed up among "her best pals and beer". She revealed to Refinery29 that the people with whom she was partying in the visual were "found over in Los Angeles" and that according to her "they are symbolic of wanting that company and wanting people around you". Reilly called the music video "a fun celebration of these joyous nights" and praised the attire chosen. Music Feeds deemed it "emotive".

On 28 March 2018, Robinson performed "Nothing to Regret" at Radio New Zealand's Auckland studios. In April of the same year, she gave an acoustic rendition of "Nothing to Regret" for MTV Australia. Robinson sang it during Mike Hosking's show at Newstalk ZB in May 2018. On 25 July 2018, the singer performed the song at Sony Music Australia's studios during a studio session. She sang the track at the 2018 New Zealand Music Awards on 15 November 2018.

== Track listing ==
- Digital download
1. "Nothing to Regret" – 3:28
- Digital download (Remixes)
1. "Nothing to Regret (Joe Stone Remix)" – 3:04
2. "Nothing to Regret (R I T U A L Remix)" – 2:59
- Digital download (Acoustic Version)
1. "Nothing to Regret (Acoustic Version)" – 3:08

== Charts ==
Chart performance for "Nothing to Regret"
Chart (2018)	Peak position
Australia (ARIA)	27
New Zealand (Recorded Music NZ)	29

== Certifications ==
Certifications for "Nothing to Regret"
Region	Certification	Certified units/sales
Australia (ARIA)	Platinum	70,000^{‡}
New Zealand (RMNZ)	2× Platinum	60,000^{‡}
^{‡} Sales+streaming figures based on certification alone.

== Release history ==
Release dates and formats for "Nothing to Regret"
Region	Date	Format(s)	Version	Label(s)	Ref.
Australia	22 February 2018	N/A	Original	Universal	
New Zealand	22 February 2018	N/A	Original	Universal	
Various	23 February 2018	Digital download; streaming	Original	Dryden Street	
Italy	13 July 2018	Radio airplay	Original	Ministry of Sound; Sony	
Various	8 June 2018	Digital download; streaming	Remix EP	Dryden Street	
Various	27 June 2018	Digital download; streaming	Acoustic	Dryden Street	
