= Up There (Six60 song) =

2017 single by Six60

Single by Six60

from the EP Six60
- Released: 17 November 2017
- Genre: Pop
- Length: 3:31
- Label: Epic, Massive
- Songwriters: Chris Mac; Eli Paewai; James Fraser; Marlon Gerbes; Matiu Walters; Printz Board
- Producers: Marlon Gerbes; Printz Board

Six60 singles chronology
| "Vibes" (2017) | "Up There" (2017) | "The Greatest" (2019) |

Music video
- "Up There" (Lyric Video) on YouTube

"Up There" is a song by New Zealand band Six60, released as the sixth and final single from their 2017 extended play Six60.

== Background and composition ==
Band vocalist Matiu Walters wrote the song that represented how it was to fall in love with music. The song references musicians who have died, including John Lennon, Bob Marley and Freddie Mercury.

== Release and promotion ==
"Up There" was one of six tracks released weekly in the build-up to their Six60 EP, on 17 November 2017, the same day of the EP's release.

== Critical reception ==
The New Zealand Herald praised the "simple and effortless[ness]" of the track, as well as the song's harmonies, while Hussein Moses of Radio New Zealand found the song's lyrical content unintentionally humorous.

== Credits and personnel ==
Credits adapted from Tidal.

- Neil Baldock – engineer
- Leslie Braithwaite – mixing
- Andrew Chavez – engineer
- Ji Fraser – guitar, songwriter
- Marlon Gerbes – keyboards, guitar, producer, songwriter
- David Kutch – mastering engineer
- Chris Mac – bass guitar, songwriter
- Eli Paewai – drums, songwriter
- Printz Board – producer, songwriter
- Matiu Walters – vocals, producer, songwriter

== Charts ==
=== Weekly charts ===
Weekly chart performance for "Up There"
| Chart (2017) | Peak position |
|---|---|
| New Zealand (Recorded Music NZ) | 37 |

=== Year-end charts ===
Year-end chart performance for "Up There"
| Chart (2018) | Position |
|---|---|
| New Zealand Artist Singles (RMNZ) | 10 |

== Certifications ==
Certification for "Up There"
| Region | Certification | Certified units/sales |
|---|---|---|
| New Zealand (RMNZ) | 3× Platinum | 90,000^{‡} |
^{‡} Sales+streaming figures based on certification alone.
