= The Greatest (Six60 song) =

2019 single by Six60

Single by Six60

from the album Six60
- Released: 26 July 2019
- Genre: Pop
- Length: 2:51
- Label: Epic, Massive
- Songwriters: Evan Bogart; Malay; Marlon Gerbes; Matiu Walters; Printz Board
- Producer: Malay

Six60 singles chronology
"Up There" (2017)	"The Greatest" (2019)	"Catching Feelings" (2019)

Music video
- "The Greatest" (lyric video) on YouTube

"The Greatest" is a song by New Zealand band Six60, released as the lead single from their third album Six60 in July 2019. The song was a commercial success, becoming triple Platinum certified in New Zealand. In 2023, a new Māori language version of the song, "Te Taumata", was used as the theme song for the 2023 Te Matatini kapa haka festival.

== Background and composition ==
The song was written and produced by the band in collaboration with American music producer Malay, and was one of the first songs the group wrote together with Malay. The song was inspired by a 1964 photo of British band the Beatles meeting boxer Muhammad Ali. The band wanted to create a song expressing how they wanted to continue to strive to be better musicians and people. The song was not one of the first tracks recorded during the album's recording sessions, but after its creation became the song that expressed the energy of what they wanted to achieve for their 2019 album.

The single artwork is an homage to the photo of the Beatles and Ali.

== Release and promotion ==
The song was released on 26 July 2019, as the leading single from their third studio album Six60. The band released a trailer for their documentary Six60: Till the Lights Go Out at the time of the release of "The Greatest".

In 2023, "The Greatest" was re-recorded in Māori as "Te Taumata". The track was translated with the help of Max Matenga, and served as the theme song of the 2023 Te Matatini kapa haka festival. The song will be released as the 50th song released from He Tau Makuru, an album project celebrating the 50th anniversary of Te Matatini.

== Critical reception ==
The song was nominated for the Aotearoa Music Award for Single of the Year at the 2019 New Zealand Music Awards, losing to "Soaked" by Benee

== Credits and personnel ==
Credits adapted from Tidal.

- Printz Board – songwriting
- Evan Bogart – songwriting
- Matt Chamberlain – drums
- Ji Fraser – guitar
- Malay – engineer, guitar, production, songwriting
- Marlon Gerbes – guitar, keyboards, songwriting
- Raul Lopez – assistant recording engineer
- Chris Mac – bass guitar
- Emerson Mancini – mastering engineer
- Manny Marroquin – mixer
- Eli Paewai – drums
- Six60 – performer
- Matiu Walters – songwriting, vocals

== Charts ==
Chart (2019)	Peak position
New Zealand (Recorded Music NZ)	3

=== Year-end charts ===
Chart (2019)	Position
New Zealand (Recorded Music NZ)	30
Chart (2020)	Position
New Zealand (Recorded Music NZ)	24
Chart (2021)	Position
New Zealand (Recorded Music NZ)	50

== Certifications ==
Certifications for "The Greatest"
Region	Certification	Certified units/sales
New Zealand (RMNZ)	7× Platinum	210,000^{‡}
^{‡} Sales+streaming figures based on certification alone.
