= Before You Leave =

2022 single by Six60

Single by Six60

from the album Castle St
- Released: 19 August 2022
- Genre: Pop
- Length: 3:57
- Label: Epic, Massive
- Songwriters: Chris Mac; Eli Paewai; Ji Fraser; Malay; Marlon Gerbes; Matiu Walters; Simon Wilcox; Yelawolf
- Producer: Malay

Six60 singles chronology
"Pepeha" (2021)	"Before You Leave" (2022)	"Never Been Tonight" (2022)

Music video
- "Before You Leave" on YouTube

"Before You Leave" is a song by New Zealand band Six60, released as a single in August 2022 as the lead single from their album Castle St.

== Background and composition ==
The song was inspired by the birth of the band's lead singer Matiu Walters' daughter. Her birth made Walters reframe his life, and the reasons why he creates music, and wanted to create a song that could impart "inspirational wisdom" to his daughter, even though she was too young to speak. The single was written and recorded in the band's studio in Dunedin as a live studio session, in a similar way to how the band recorded their first songs together.

== Release and promotion ==
"Before You Leave" was released as the lead single from Castle St on 19 August, a month and a half before the album. A music video for the song was released on the same day. In November during their visit to Auckland, Canadian pop duo Neon Dreams performed a cover of the song.

== Credits and personnel ==
- Ji Fraser – guitar, songwriting
- Marlon Gerbes – keyboards, songwriting
- David Kutch – mastering engineer
- Raul Lopez – engineer, mixer
- Chris Mac – bass, songwriting
- Malay – producer, songwriting
- Eli Paewai – drums, songwriting
- Matiu Walters – vocals, songwriting
- Simon Wilcox – songwriting
- Yelawolf – songwriting

== Charts ==
=== Weekly charts ===
Chart (2022)	Peak position
New Zealand (Recorded Music NZ)	3

=== Year-end charts ===
Chart (2022)	Position
New Zealand Artist Singles (Recorded Music NZ)	17

== Certifications ==
Certifications for "Before You Leave"
Region	Certification	Certified units/sales
New Zealand (RMNZ)	3× Platinum	90,000^{‡}
^{‡} Sales+streaming figures based on certification alone.
