= Someone to Be Around =

2009 song by Six60

Promotional single by Six60

from the album Six60
- Released: 2008
- Length: 3:28
- Songwriters: James Fraser; Matiu Walters
- Producer: Six60

"Someone to Be Around" is a song by New Zealand band Six60. Originally released on their limited-release extended play Six60 in 2008, the song was performed live on the group's 2013 iTunes Session EP. The song was added to the 10th anniversary of their debut album Six60 in 2021, and became the most played song of New Zealand origin on New Zealand airwaves in 2022.

== Background and composition ==
"Someone to Be Around" is one of the band's earliest songs, released as a part of the 2008 EP, written by band members James Fraser and Matiu Walters. The song was not included in the 2011 release of their debut album Six60, however it became a fan favourite due to the band including it in live performances. Band vocalist Matiu Walters considers the song one of the most underrated songs released by the band.

== Release ==
In 2013, the band performed the song as a part of a live session held at Roundhead Studios, which was released as the iTunes Session EP on 20 December 2013. After the EP's release, the song charted on the New Zealand domestic releases singles chart, reaching number 17.

The song was included as a bonus track on the 10th Anniversary edition of the band's debut album, released in October 2021. The song debuted at number 10 on the New Zealand domestic releases singles chart, breaking into the official top 40 chart in January 2022. The song returned to the top 40 singles in January 2023, and had become platinum certified during the year.

At the 2022 Aotearoa Music Awards, the song was given the Radio Airplay Record of the Year award.

== Credits and personnel ==
Credits adapted from Tidal.

- Chris Chetland – mastering engineer (for Gold Album)
- James Fraser – composer
- Simon Gooding – mixing
- Six60 – performer, producer
- Matiu Walters – composer

== Charts ==
=== Weekly charts ===
Chart (2021–2023)	Peak position
New Zealand (Recorded Music NZ)	37

=== Year-end charts ===
Chart (2022)	Position
New Zealand Artist Singles (Recorded Music NZ)	9

== Certifications ==
Certifications for "Someone to Be Around"
Region	Certification	Certified units/sales
New Zealand (RMNZ)	4× Platinum	120,000^{‡}
^{‡} Sales+streaming figures based on certification alone.
