= Never Been Tonight =

2022 single by Six60

Single by Six60

from the album Castle St
- Released: 16 September 2022
- Genre: Pop
- Length: 3:08
- Label: Epic, Massive
- Songwriter(s): Chris Mac; Eli Paewai; Ji Fraser; Malay; Marlon Gerbes; Matiu Walters; Simon Wilcox
- Producer(s): Malay

Six60 singles chronology
"Before You Leave" (2022)	"Never Been Tonight" (2022)	"Always Beside You" (2022)

Music video
- "Never Been Tonight" on YouTube

"Never Been Tonight" is a song by New Zealand band Six60, released as a single in September 2022 as the second single from their album Castle St, alongside the track "Nobody Knows".

== Background and composition ==
The band's lead vocalist Matiu Walters described the song as "a celebration of the best nights of your life and the best nights that are still to come", and a song that felt like a New Zealand summer.

== Release and promotion ==
"Before You Leave" was released as a single from Castle St on 16 September, with the song "Nobody Knows" as a B-side. A music video for the song was released on 15 December.

== Credits and personnel ==
- Ji Fraser – guitar, songwriting
- Marlon Gerbes – keyboards, songwriting
- David Kutch – mastering engineer
- Raul Lopez – engineer, mixer
- Chris Mac – bass, songwriting
- Malay – producer, songwriting
- Eli Paewai – drums, songwriting
- Matiu Walters – vocals, songwriting
- Simon Wilcox – songwriting

== Charts ==
Chart (2022)	Peak position
New Zealand (Recorded Music NZ)	39

== Certifications ==
Certifications for "Never Been Tonight"
Region	Certification	Certified units/sales
New Zealand (RMNZ)	Gold	15,000^{‡}
^{‡} Sales+streaming figures based on certification alone.
