= Robinson (singer) =

- Born: Anna Mary Robinson; 2 September 1996 (age 29); Nelson, New Zealand
- Origin: Nelson, New Zealand
- Genres: Pop
- Occupation: Singer
- Instrument: Vocals
- Years active: 2017–present
- Labels: Sony Music Australia, Ministry of Sound, Columbia, Dryden Street
- Website: www.robinsonofficial.com

Anna Robinson (born 2 September 1996), better known mononymously as Robinson, is a New Zealand singer-songwriter and musician. Born in Nelson, she was educated at Garin College. Robinson released her first single "Don't You Forget About Me" in May 2017. In February 2018, Robinson signed to Sony Music Australia and Ministry of Sound. Her song "Nothing to Regret" reached the top 40 in Australia and New Zealand in 2018. She was set to be an opening act for the British girl group, Little Mix, on LM5: The Tour, before the cancellation of the Oceania tour dates.

== Discography ==
=== EPs ===
List of EPs, with selected details about release date and labels
Title	Details
Watching You	Released: 14 February 2020; Formats: Digital download, streaming; Labels: Sony Australia, Ministry of Sound
Chasing Nirvana	Scheduled: 10 November 2023; Formats: Digital download, streaming; Labels: Robinson Music

=== Singles ===
==== As lead artist ====
List of singles as lead artist, with selected chart positions and certifications
Title	Year	Peak chart positions		Certifications	Album
Title	Year	NZ	AUS	Certifications	Album
"Don't You Forget About Me"	2017	—	—		Non-album singles
"Crave You"	2017	—	—		Non-album singles
"Nothing to Regret"	2018	29	27	ARIA: Platinum	Non-album singles
"Don't Trust Myself"	2018	—	—		Non-album singles
"Medicine"	2018	—	—		Non-album singles
"Karma"	2019	— (Note: "Karma" did not enter the NZ Top 40 Singles Chart, but peaked at number 13 on the NZ Hot Singles Chart.)	—		Non-album singles
"Don't Say"	2019	— (Note: "Don't Say" did not enter the NZ Top 40 Singles Chart, but peaked at number 13 on the NZ Hot Singles Chart.)	—		Watching You
"Watching You"	2020	— (Note: "Watching You" did not enter the NZ Top 40 Singles Chart, but peaked at number 15 on the NZ Hot Singles Chart.)	—		Watching You
"How Can I Resist Her"	2021	—	—		True Colours, New Colours: The Songs of Split Enz
"Teenage Renegade"	2022	— (Note: "Teenage Renegade" did not enter the NZ Top 40 Singles Chart, but peaked at number 12 on the NZ Hot Singles Chart.)	—		Non-album single
"Oblivion"	2023	— (Note: "Oblivion" did not enter the NZ Top 40 Singles Chart, but peaked at number 22 on the NZ Hot Singles Chart.)	—		Chasing Nirvana
"Things Aren't Nice in Paradise"	2023	— (Note: "Things Aren't Nice in Paradise" did not enter the NZ Top 40 Singles Chart, but peaked at number 15 on the NZ Hot Singles Chart.)	—		Chasing Nirvana
"Nirvana"	2023	—	—		Chasing Nirvana
"Regardless"	2023	—	—		Chasing Nirvana
"It's All Over You"	2023	—	—		Chasing Nirvana
"The War on Art"	2024	—	—		TBA
"Landslide"	2024	—	—		TBA
"David Blaine"	2024	—	—		TBA
"Wild Horses"	2025	—	—		TBA

==== As featured artist ====
List of singles as featured artist, with selected chart positions
Title	Year	Peak chart positions	Album
Title	Year	AUS	Album
"Hide" (Franky Wah featuring Robinson)	2019	—	Non-album singles
"Glow" (Corsak featuring Robinson)	2019	—	Non-album singles
"Lean on Me" (Illy featuring Robinson)	2019	90	The Space Between
"High Road" (Young Bombs featuring Robinson)	2020	—	The Young Bombs Show
