= Castle St =

2022 album by Six60

Studio album by Six60
- Released: 7 October 2022
- Genre: Pop rock
- Length: 33:09
- Label: Epic; Massive Entertainment
- Producer: Malay

Six60 chronology
Six60 (2019)	Castle St (2022)	Right Here Right Now (2026)

Singles from Castle St
- 1. "Before You Leave" Released: 19 August 2022; 2. "Never Been Tonight" Released: 15 September 2022

Castle St is the fourth studio album by New Zealand band Six60. The band's second collaboration with American music producer Malay, Castle St debuted at number one on the New Zealand Albums Chart.

== Production ==
The album was co-produced by American music producer Malay, who previously worked on the band's 2019 album Six60.

The album's title comes from the Dunedin Street where the band members lived during university. The band began working on the album in Los Angeles, where they spent six months together. Band vocalist Matiu Walters felt that this time was a period of rejuvenation for the band, where they rediscovered the bonds they had created when originally living together as flatmates.

== Release ==
The album's first single "Before You Leave", inspired by the birth of lead vocalist Matiu Walters's daughter, was released on 19 August 2022. This was followed by "Never Been Tonight" in September 2022, which featured the album track "Nobody Knows" as the single's B-side.

To promote the album, a replica of their Castle Street house was constructed and displayed in Eden Park, Auckland.

The band toured New Zealand during the summer between October 2022 and March 2023, with their annual Six60 Saturdays tour. The band's previous summer tour was postponed due to the effects of COVID-19 in New Zealand. New Zealand band Supergroove reformed to play as an opening act for the tour's Wellington and Auckland dates. The band also toured Australia with The Castle St World Tour, held from December 2022 to February 2023.

== Track listing ==
Castle St track listing
No.	Title	Writer(s)	Length
1.	"Tahi"	Chris Mac; Eli Paewai; Ji Fraser; Malay; Marlon Gerbes; Matiu Walters; Simon Wilcox	2:06
2.	"Before You Leave"	Mac; Paewai; Fraser; Malay; Gerbes; Walters; Wilcox; Yelawolf	3:57
3.	"Hang On"	Mac; Paewai; Fraser; Malay; Gerbes; Walters; Wilcox	2:43
4.	"Nobody Knows"	Mac; Paewai; Fraser; Malay; Gerbes; Walters; Wilcox	2:58
5.	"Say It Now"	Mac; Paewai; Fraser; Malay; Gerbes; Walters; Wilcox	2:26
6.	"Good Wine"	Mac; Paewai; Fraser; Malay; Gerbes; Walters; Wilcox	3:31
7.	"Far Away So Close"	Mac; Paewai; Fraser; Malay; Gerbes; Walters; Wilcox	3:27
8.	"Throw It Away"	Mac; Paewai; Fraser; Malay; Gerbes; Walters; Wilcox; Trey Campbell	2:42
9.	"Never Been Tonight"	Mac; Paewai; Fraser; Malay; Gerbes; Walters; Wilcox	3:08
10.	"It Isn't Over"	Mac; Paewai; Fraser; Malay; Gerbes; Walters; Wilcox	2:28
11.	"Take My Hand" (bonus track)	Malay; Gerbes; Walters; Paul Phamous	2:28
Total length:			33:09

== Credits and personnel ==
- Trey Campbell – songwriting (8)
- Ji Fraser – guitar, songwriting (1–10)
- Marlon Gerbes – keyboards, songwriting
- David Kutch – mastering engineer
- Raul Lopez – engineer, mixer
- Chris Mac – bass, songwriting (1–10)
- Malay – producer, songwriting
- Eli Paewai – drums, songwriting (1–10)
- Paul Phamous – songwriting (11)
- Matiu Walters – vocals, songwriting
- Simon Wilcox – songwriting (1–7, 9–10)
- Yelawolf – songwriting (2)

== Charts ==
=== Weekly charts ===
Weekly chart performance for Castle St
Chart (2022)	Peak position
Australian Albums (ARIA)	47
New Zealand Albums (RMNZ)	1

=== Year-end charts ===
Year-end chart performance for Castle St
Chart (2022)	Position
New Zealand Albums (RMNZ)	50

== Certifications and sales ==
Region	Certification	Certified units/sales
New Zealand (RMNZ)	Gold	7,500^{‡}
^{‡} Sales+streaming figures based on certification alone.

== Release history ==
Release dates and formats for Castle St
Region	Date	Format(s)	Label(s)	Ref.
New Zealand	7 October 2022	CD; vinyl; cassette; digital download; streaming	Epic; Massive Entertainment	
