= The Tutts =

New Zealand rock band

- Origin: New Zealand
- Genres: Rock
- Years active: 2006–2010
- Members: Scott Allen; Mat Robertson; Dan McLaughlin; John McNab; James Percy
- Website: thetutts.co.nz

The Tutts were a five-piece New Zealand rock band from Auckland. They released their first single, titled "K", on 21 November 2006. C4, a New Zealand music TV channel, used "K" as a promo song.

The Tutts supported The Strokes on their New Zealand tour. The Tutts were nominated for single of the year with "K" at the 2007 New Zealand Music Awards. They also performed at the Auckland Big Day Out 2007 and 2009.

Their first (and only) album, Get in the Club, was released in 2008.

== Band members ==
- Scott Allen – Singer/synth
- Mat Robertson – Guitar
- Dan McLaughlin – Guitar/synth
- John McNab – Bass
- James Percy – drums

== Discography ==
- Get in the Club (2008)
