= Closer (Six60 song) =

2017 single by Six60

Single by Six60

from the album Six60
- Released: 27 October 2017
- Genre: Pop
- Length: 3:16
- Label: Epic, Massive
- Songwriters: Chris Mac; Eli Paewai; James Fraser; Marlon Gerbes; Matiu Walters; Printz Board
- Producers: Marlon Gerbes; Printz Board

Six60 singles chronology
"Rivers" (2017)	"Closer" (2017)	"Rolling Stone" (2017)

Music video
- "Closer" (Lyric Video) on YouTube

"Closer" is a song by New Zealand band Six60, released as the third single from their 2017 extended play Six60.

== Background and composition ==
The band members described "Closer" as "a feelgood song", where they spent time and effort taking a complex song and packaging it as simple. Lyrically, the song describes a man wanting to get physically closer to somebody at a party.

== Release and promotion ==
"Closer" was one of six tracks released weekly in the build-up to their Six60 EP, on 27 October 2017. "Closer" became the most played song on New Zealand radio in May 2018, after the EP's lead single "Don't Give It Up" spent six months from November 2017 to May 2018 at the top of the radio airplay rankings.

== Critical reception ==
Katie Parker of Radio New Zealand felt that the song "nails Six60's penchant for writing songs ostensibly about something but actually about nothing", and described "Closer" as being "like a list of hashtags beneath a very inoffensive, but somehow still upsetting, Instagram".

== Credits and personnel ==
Credits adapted from Tidal.

- Neil Baldock – engineer
- Leslie Braithwaite – mixing
- Andrew Chavez – engineer
- Ji Fraser – guitar, songwriter
- Marlon Gerbes – keyboards, guitar, producer, songwriter
- David Kutch – mastering engineer
- Chris Mac – bass guitar, songwriter
- Eli Paewai – drums, songwriter
- Printz Board – producer, songwriter
- Matiu Walters – vocals, producer, songwriter

== Charts ==
=== Weekly charts ===
Weekly chart performance for "Up There"
Chart (2017)	Peak position
New Zealand (Recorded Music NZ)	14

=== Year-end charts ===
Year-end chart performance for "Closer"
Chart (2018)	Position
New Zealand (Recorded Music NZ)	29

== Certifications ==
Certifications for "Closer"
Region	Certification	Certified units/sales
New Zealand (RMNZ)	6× Platinum	180,000^{‡}
^{‡} Sales+streaming figures based on certification alone.
