= Vibes (song) =

2017 single by Six60

Single by Six60

from the album Six60
- Released: 10 November 2017
- Genre: Pop
- Length: 3:31
- Label: Epic, Massive
- Songwriters: Chris Mac; Eli Paewai; James Fraser; Marlon Gerbes; Matiu Walters; Printz Board
- Producers: Marlon Gerbes; Printz Board

Six60 singles chronology
"Rolling Stone" (2017)	"Vibes" (2017)	"Up There" (2017)

Music video
- "Vibes" (Lyric Video) on YouTube

"Vibes" is a song by New Zealand band Six60, released as the fifth single from their 2017 extended play Six60.

== Background and composition ==
The members of Six60 described "Vibes" as a fun track for them to perform live with a "groovy beat".

== Release and promotion ==
"Vibes" was one of six tracks released weekly in the build-up to their Six60 EP, on 10 November 2017. The band performed the song live at You Are Us/Aroha Nui, a 2019 charity concert held as a response to the Christchurch mosque shootings. The band were criticsed for performing the song due to its inclusion of references to firearms.

The song was a commercial success, becoming the top performing song by a New Zealand act in the country in 2018.

== Critical reception ==
The New Zealand Herald praised the "simple and effortless[ness]" of the track, as well as the song's "finger-snapping R&B". Katie Parker of Radio New Zealand praised the song's catchiness and beat, but criticised the song's title and the firearms metaphor in the lyrics.

== Credits and personnel ==
Credits adapted from Tidal.

- Neil Baldock – engineer
- Leslie Braithwaite – mixing
- Andrew Chavez – engineer
- Ji Fraser – guitar, songwriter
- Marlon Gerbes – keyboards, guitar, producer, songwriter
- David Kutch – mastering engineer
- Chris Mac – bass guitar, songwriter
- Eli Paewai – drums, songwriter
- Printz Board – producer, songwriter
- Matiu Walters – vocals, producer, songwriter

== Charts ==
=== Weekly charts ===
Weekly chart performance for "Vibes"
Chart (2017)	Peak position
New Zealand (Recorded Music NZ)	9

=== Year-end charts ===
Year-end chart performance for "Vibes"
Chart (2018)	Position
New Zealand (Recorded Music NZ)	18
Chart (2019)	Position
New Zealand (Recorded Music NZ)	33

== Certifications ==
Certifications for "Vibes"
Region	Certification	Certified units/sales
New Zealand (RMNZ)	8× Platinum	240,000^{‡}
^{‡} Sales+streaming figures based on certification alone.
