= Don't Give It Up (Six60 song) =

2017 single by Six60

Single by Six60

from the EP Six60
- Released: 13 October 2017
- Genre: Pop
- Length: 3:21
- Label: Epic, Massive
- Songwriters: Chris Mac; Eli Paewai; James Fraser; Marlon Gerbes; Matiu Walters; Printz Board
- Producers: Marlon Gerbes; Printz Board

Six60 singles chronology
"Exhale" (2015)	"Don't Give It Up" (2017)	"Rivers" (2017)

Music video
- "Don't Give It Up" (Lyric Video) on YouTube

"Don't Give It Up" is a song by New Zealand band Six60, released as the lead single from their 2017 extended play Six60.

== Background and composition ==
The song was the first that Six60 recorded for the Six60 EP sessions. The song was created by Six60 as a way to play with space, and to use silence as an instrument. The song was sonically inspired by the "sophisticated simplicity" of musicians such as Bob Marley, Queen and the Beatles, and began as a piano demo performed by Marlon Gerbes, that the band stripped back to the most basic aspects. Lyrically, the band wanted to create an ambiguous song where listeners could put their own voice and experiences into the track, such as social media-related anxiety and other "unique challenges" faced at the time.

== Release and promotion ==
"Don't Give It Up" was the first of six tracks released weekly in the build-up to their Six60 EP, on 13 October 2017. The band performed "Don't Give It Up" at the 2018 New Zealand Music Awards. "Don't Give It Up" spent six months from November 2017 to May 2018 as the most performed song on New Zealand radio.

New Zealand musician Miller Yule released an acoustic cover of the song in 2018, on his live EP Miller Yule Live.

== Critical reception ==
Chris Schulz of The New Zealand Herald praised "Don't Give It Up" as an "earworm sugar rush". Hussein Moses of Radio New Zealand described the song as "basically one big unimaginative feel-good singalong about nothing in particular, which is bound to annoy critics and please just about everyone else."

Mark Beynes of MAINZ analysed "Don't Give It Up", describing the song as a diatonic track borrowing the rhythm of 1960s pop songs, such as "Oh, Pretty Woman" by Roy Orbison, noting the track's "tasteful vocal harmonies".

The song was nominated for the Aotearoa Music Award for Single of the Year at the 2018 New Zealand Music Awards, losing to "Woke Up Late" by Drax Project. The song was awarded both the Te Tōtahi Hoko Teitei/Vodafone Highest Selling Single and Te Rikoata Marakerake o te Tau/NZ On Air Radio Airplay Record of the Year awards.

== Credits and personnel ==
Credits adapted from Tidal.

- Neil Baldock – engineer
- Leslie Braithwaite – mixing
- Andrew Chavez – engineer
- Ji Fraser – guitar, songwriter
- Marlon Gerbes – keyboards, guitar, producer, songwriter
- Dmitry Gorodetsky – bass guitar
- David Kutch – mastering engineer
- Chris Mac – bass guitar, songwriter
- Eli Paewai – drums, songwriter
- Printz Board – producer, songwriter
- Matiu Walters – vocals, producer, songwriter

== Charts ==
=== Weekly charts ===
Weekly chart performance for "Don't Give It Up"
Chart (2017)	Peak position
New Zealand (Recorded Music NZ)	4

=== Year-end charts ===
Year-end chart performance for "Don't Give It Up"
Chart (2018)	Position
New Zealand (Recorded Music NZ)	22

== Certifications ==
Certifications for "Don't Give It Up"
Region	Certification	Certified units/sales
New Zealand (RMNZ)	7× Platinum	210,000^{‡}
^{‡} Sales+streaming figures based on certification alone.
