= Aaria =

New Zealand pop band

- Origin: New Zealand
- Years active: 2000–2003
- Past members: Hayden Weke; Amomai Pihama; Hemi Peke; Te Rau o te Rangi Winterburn; Tomairangi Mareikura

Aaria was a New Zealand pop band that formed in 2000. Aaria had two New Zealand charting singles that both made it into the top 20. The first single released in 2001 was "Kei A Wai Ra Te Kupu" lasted for 12 weeks on the charts and peaked at 14. Their second single, "Cry No More", also in 2001 lasted for four weeks on the charts and peaked at 7.

"Kei A Wai Ra Te Kupu" was nominated for Single of the Year at the 2002 New Zealand Music Awards.

== Discography ==
Year	Single	Album	Charted	Certification
	"Kei A Wai Ra Te Kupu"		14	-
	"Cry No More"		7	-
