= Rolling Stone (Six60 song) =

2017 single by Six60

Single by Six60

from the EP Six60
- Released: 3 November 2017
- Genre: Pop
- Length: 2:56
- Label: Epic, Massive
- Songwriters: Chris Mac; Eli Paewai; James Fraser; Marlon Gerbes; Matiu Walters; Printz Board
- Producers: Marlon Gerbes; Printz Board

Six60 singles chronology
"Closer" (2017)	"Rolling Stone" (2017)	"Vibes" (2017)

Music video
- "Rolling Stone" (Lyric Video) on YouTube

"Rolling Stone" is a song by New Zealand band Six60, released as the fourth single from their 2017 extended play Six60 (2017).

== Background and composition ==
"Rolling Stone" is a break-up song, Band member Ji Fraser felt that the song was "powerful", and liked the song's sentiment of not being angry at a person after the break-up of a relationship. The song was almost cut from the tracklist of the Six60 EP.

== Release and promotion ==
"Rolling Stone" was one of six tracks released weekly in the build-up to their Six60 EP, on 3 November 2017.

== Critical reception ==
Katie Parker of Radio New Zealand praised the song for its catchiness and Walters' vocal delivery, and felt that this was significantly different to the majority of Six60's music.

== Credits and personnel ==
Credits adapted from Tidal.

- Neil Baldock – engineer
- Leslie Braithwaite – mixing
- Andrew Chavez – engineer
- Ji Fraser – guitar, songwriter
- Marlon Gerbes – keyboards, guitar, producer, songwriter
- David Kutch – mastering engineer
- Chris Mac – bass guitar, songwriter
- Eli Paewai – drums, songwriter
- Printz Board – producer, songwriter
- Matiu Walters – vocals, producer, songwriter

== Charts ==
=== Weekly charts ===
Weekly chart performance for "Rolling Stone"
Chart (2017)	Peak position
New Zealand (Recorded Music NZ)	20

=== Year-end charts ===
Year-end chart performance for "Rolling Stone"
Chart (2017)	Position
New Zealand Artist Singles (RMNZ)	10
Chart (2018)	Position
New Zealand Artist Singles (RMNZ)	8
Chart (2019)	Position
New Zealand Artist Singles (RMNZ)	18

== Certifications ==
Certifications for "Rolling Stone"
Region	Certification	Certified units/sales
New Zealand (RMNZ)	4× Platinum	120,000^{‡}
^{‡} Sales+streaming figures based on certification alone.
