= Kei A Wai Ra Te Kupu =

Single by Aaria
- Released: 2001
- Recorded: 2001
- Genre: Pop
- Label: Sony BMG; Urban Pacifika Records
- Songwriter(s): Sam Feo; Hohepa Tamehana
- Producer(s): Phylpcyde; Sani Sagala; Carlos Marsh

Aaria singles chronology
"Kei A Wai Ra Te Kupu" (2001)	"'Cry No More'" (2002)

"Kei a Wai Ra te Kupu" is a song by New Zealand Māori pop group Aaria, released as a single in 2001. It reached number 14 on the New Zealand singles chart and received a Platinum Plaque for CD sales.

== Track listings ==
1. Kei a Wai Ra Te Kupu (Maori Radio Edit)
2. Kei a Wai Ra Te Kupu (English Radio Edit)
3. Kei a Wai Ra Te Kupu (Maori 2 Step Garage Remix)
4. Kei a Wai Ra Te Kupu (Maori A cappella Mix)
5. Born of Greatness
