= Rivers (Six60 song) =

2017 single by Six60

Single by Six60

from the EP Six60
- Released: 20 October 2017
- Genre: Pop
- Length: 3:24
- Label: Epic, Massive
- Songwriters: Chris Mac; Eli Paewai; James Fraser; Marlon Gerbes; Matiu Walters; Printz Board
- Producers: Marlon Gerbes; Printz Board

Six60 singles chronology
"Don't Give It Up" (2017)	"Rivers" (2017)	"Closer" (2017)

Music video
- "Rivers" (Lyric Video) on YouTube

"Rivers" is a song by New Zealand band Six60, released as the second single from their 2017 extended play Six60.

== Background and composition ==
The song was written and recorded by the band in Los Angeles. Initially the song was not planned to be a part of the recording process, and developed around a chord played by Printz Board on a Minimoog Voyager synthesiser. Band member Marlon Gerbes feels that the song is "a reflection of [his] current journey into understanding myself and this world around me."

== Release and promotion ==
"Rivers" was the second of six tracks released weekly in the build-up to their Six60 EP, on 20 October 2017.

American musician Teddy Swims covered the song on YouTube in 2019, which became a viral video.

== Critical reception ==
Kat Bein of Billboard praised the romantic and playful feel of the song, describing it as "if you listened to Drake on a shoreside date with the stars overhead", while The New Zealand Herald praised the "casual soul" and the "simple and effortless[ness]" of the track. Mark Beynes of MAINZ described the song as "relaxed and uncontrived...there is no sense that the track is 'trying' too hard at all," and noted the song's tresillo rhythm. Hussein Moses of Radio New Zealand reviewed the song negatively, describing it as "unstimulating" and as one of his least favourite songs from the Six60 EP.

== Credits and personnel ==
Credits adapted from Tidal.

- Neil Baldock – engineer
- Leslie Braithwaite – mixing
- Andrew Chavez – engineer
- Ji Fraser – guitar, songwriter
- Marlon Gerbes – keyboards, guitar, producer, songwriter
- David Kutch – mastering engineer
- Chris Mac – bass guitar, songwriter
- Eli Paewai – drums, songwriter
- Printz Board – producer, songwriter
- Matiu Walters – vocals, producer, songwriter

== Charts ==
=== Weekly charts ===
Weekly chart performance for "Rivers"
Chart (2017)	Peak position
New Zealand (Recorded Music NZ)	32

=== Year-end charts ===
Year-end chart performance for "Rivers"
Chart (2017)	Position
New Zealand Artist Singles (RMNZ)	9
Chart (2018)	Position
New Zealand Artist Singles (RMNZ)	6
Chart (2019)	Position
New Zealand Artist Singles (RMNZ)	13

== Certifications ==
Certifications for "Rivers"
Region	Certification	Certified units/sales
New Zealand (RMNZ)	5× Platinum	150,000^{‡}
^{‡} Sales+streaming figures based on certification alone.
