= Six60 =

New Zealand rock band

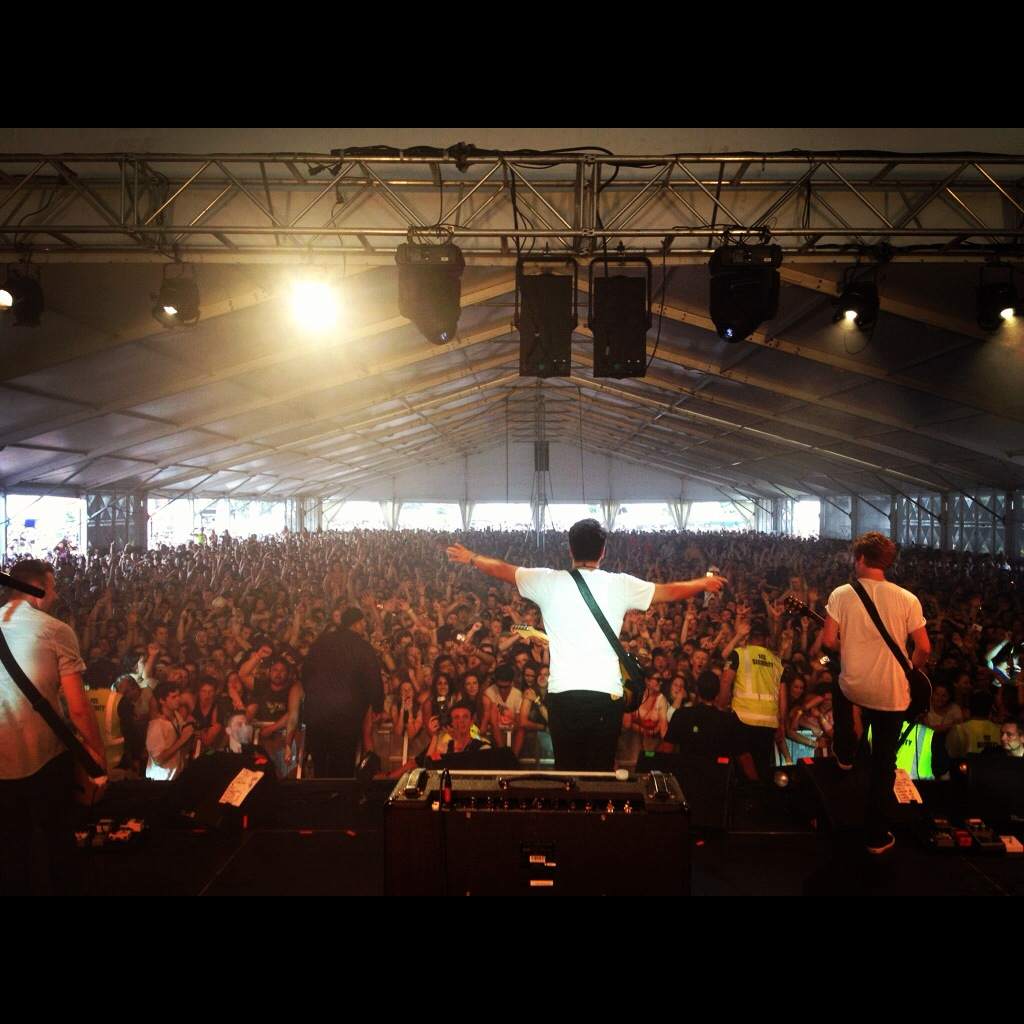

Background information
- Origin: Dunedin, New Zealand
- Genres: Soul; electronica; drum and bass; pop rock; R&B
- Years active: 2008–present
- Labels: Epic; Massive
- Members: Chris Mac; Ji Fraser; Marlon Gerbes; Matiu Walters
- Past members: Hoani Matenga; Eli Paewai

Six60 (stylised in all caps as SIX60) is a New Zealand pop rock band formed in Dunedin, Otago in 2008. The band consists of Matiu Walters (lead vocals, guitar), Ji Fraser (lead guitar), Chris Mac (drums, bass guitar), and Marlon Gerbes (guitar, bass guitar, synthesiser).

Their self-titled debut album was released on 10 October 2011 on their own label Massive Entertainment. The album was produced and mixed by Tiki Taane and debuted at number one in the New Zealand charts and was certified gold within its first week of release. Their first two singles "Rise Up 2.0" and "Don't Forget Your Roots" reached number one and number two respectively on the RIANZ singles chart and were both certified double and triple platinum.

In 2018 the band won five Vodafone New Zealand Music Awards and were the most streamed artist by New Zealanders on Spotify. On 23 February 2019, Six60 became the first New Zealand band to play a sold-out concert at the Western Springs Stadium, to a crowd of 50,000 fans. On 24 April 2021, Six60 played the first concert at Auckland's Eden Park Stadium, to a crowd of 50,000 fans. It was the closing of the Six60 Saturdays country-wide tour and the largest concert of 2021.

In February 2024, founding member Eli Paewai left the band, saying his "personal journey with music is coming to an end".

== History ==
Six60 was formed in Dunedin; the founding members met while attending University of Otago. The band created their name from the street number of the house they lived at in Dunedin, 660 Castle Street. As Ji Fraser said, "That's where it all began. It was the beginning of everything. It was a place that meant so much to us." In July 2021 the band bought 660 Castle Street and created four $10,000 performing arts scholarships at the University of Otago.

Their local following developed from Dunedin to other student hubs around the country such as Auckland, Waikato, Christchurch and Wellington.

Six60's original EP, released in 2008, contained a track called "Someone to Be Around". This track was left off their debut album but remains one of their most popular songs.

Six60 have a quadruple platinum number-one debut album with triple platinum-selling single "Don't Forget Your Roots", two double platinum-selling singles "Only to Be" and "Rise Up", two platinum-selling singles "Forever" and "Special", and one gold-selling single "Lost".

In early March 2013 the band was featured on George FM Breakfast's 'Damn! I Wish I Was Your Cover' series covering Rudimental's "Feel the Love".

In 2014, their song "Run for It" was featured on the trailer of ITV drama series Prey, starring John Simm.

Chris uses a MOOG Voyager / Ernie Ball Music Man StingRay bass guitars. Matiu and Ji both play Fender Strats, Gibson Les Paul electric guitars, and Gibson and Maton acoustic guitars while Marlon uses an MS2000 / Muse VIP / Fender Strat. Eli plays KDrums drums. Matiu's younger brother Niko Walters debuted as a musician in 2019, and has performed as an opening act for Six60.

== Sweet Home Aotearoa Festival ==
In October 2025, SIX60 announced the launch of a new country and roots music festival called Sweet Home Aotearoa. The event took place on 3 January 2026, at Matakana Country Park in New Zealand. Organized by the band itself, the festival aims to celebrate diverse musical influences and bring together artists from across genres.

The festival marks a significant expansion of SIX60's role in the New Zealand music scene, not only as performers but also as curators and promoters of live music experiences.

== Discography ==
=== Studio albums ===
Title	Album details	Peak chart positions		Certifications
Title	Album details	NZ	AUS	Certifications
Six60	Released: 10 October 2011; Label: Massive Entertainment; Format: CD, digital download	1	—	RMNZ: 13× Platinum
Six60	Released: 27 February 2015; Label: Massive Entertainment; Format: CD, 2×LP, digital download	1	—	RMNZ: 9× Platinum
Six60	Released: 8 November 2019; Label: Epic, Massive Entertainment; Format: CD, digital download, streaming	1	8	RMNZ: 7× Platinum
Castle St	Released: 7 October 2022; Label: Epic, Massive Entertainment; Format: CD, digital download, streaming	1	47	RMNZ: Gold
Right Here Right Now	Released: 13 February 2026; Label: Epic, Massive Entertainment; Format: CD, digital download, streaming	1	27	
"—" denotes an album that did not chart in that country.

=== Live albums ===
Title	Album details	Peak chart positions
Title	Album details	NZ
The Grassroots Album	Released: 6 September 2024; Label: Massive Entertainment; Format: CD, digital download, streaming	2

=== Compilation albums ===
Title	Album details	Peak chart positions	Certifications
Title	Album details	NZ	Certifications
The Six60 Collection	Released: 12 April 2024; Label: UMG; Format: Digital download, streaming	2	RMNZ: Platinum

=== Extended plays ===
Title	EP details	Peak chart positions	Certifications
Title	EP details	NZ	Certifications
Six60	Released: 2008; Label: Self-released; Format: CD, digital download, streaming	—	
iTunes Session EP	Released: 20 December 2013; Label: Massive Entertainment; Format: Digital download	15	
Six60	Released: 17 November 2017; Label: Massive; Format: Digital download	2	RMNZ: 7× Platinum

=== Singles ===
==== As lead artist ====
Title	Year	Peak chart positions	Certifications	Album
Title	Year	NZ	Certifications	Album
"Rise Up 2.0"	2010	1	RMNZ: 3× Platinum	Six60
"Don't Forget Your Roots"	2011	2	RMNZ: 12× Platinum	Six60
"Only to Be"	2011	5	RMNZ: 8× Platinum	Six60
"Forever"	2012	11	RMNZ: 5× Platinum	Six60
"In the Clear" (featuring Paul Mac)	2012	12	RMNZ: Gold	Six60
"Forever (Movie Version)"	2013	—		Vaterfreuden OST
"Special"	2014	1	RMNZ: 7× Platinum	Six60 (2)
"So High"	2015	10	RMNZ: 5× Platinum	Six60 (2)
"White Lines"	2015	5	RMNZ: 6× Platinum	Six60 (2)
"Purple"	2015	— (Note: "Purple" did not reach the top 40 of the New Zealand Singles Chart, but peaked at number 3 on the Heatseekers chart.)	RMNZ: 4× Platinum	Six60 (2)
"Stay Together"	2015	—	RMNZ: 2× Platinum	Six60 (2)
"Exhale"	2015	—	RMNZ: Platinum	Six60 (2)
"Don't Give It Up"	2017	4	RMNZ: 7× Platinum	Six60 EP
"Rivers"	2017	32	RMNZ: 5× Platinum	Six60 EP
"Closer"	2017	14	RMNZ: 6× Platinum	Six60 EP
"Rolling Stone"	2017	20	RMNZ: 4× Platinum	Six60 EP
"Vibes"	2017	9	RMNZ: 8× Platinum	Six60 EP
"Up There"	2017	37	RMNZ: 3× Platinum	Six60 EP
"The Greatest"	2019	3	RMNZ: 7× Platinum	Six60 (3)
"Please Don't Go"	2019	2	RMNZ: 5× Platinum	Six60 (3)
"Raining"	2019	8	RMNZ: 5× Platinum	Six60 (3)
"Never Enough"	2019	10	RMNZ: 3× Platinum	Six60 (3)
"Long Gone"	2020	5	RMNZ: 6× Platinum	Six60 (3)
"Sundown"	2020	6	RMNZ: 6× Platinum	Six60 (3)
"Fade Away"	2020	9	RMNZ: 3× Platinum	Non-album singles
"All She Wrote"	2021	1	RMNZ: 4× Platinum	Non-album singles
"Pepeha"	2021	2	RMNZ: 4× Platinum	Non-album singles
"Before You Leave"	2022	3	RMNZ: 3× Platinum	Castle St
"Never Been Tonight"	2022	39	RMNZ: Gold	Castle St
"Never Coming Home" (with Hilltop Hoods)	2025	—		Fall from the Light
"We Made It"	2025	36	RMNZ: Gold	Right Here Right Now
"Knocking at Your Door"	2026	— (Note: "Knocking at Your Door" did not enter the NZ Top 40 Singles Chart, but peaked at number 6 on the NZ Hot Singles Chart.)		Right Here Right Now
"—" denotes a recording that did not chart in that country.

==== As featured artist ====
Title	Year	Peak chart positions			Certifications	Album
Title	Year	NZ	NZ Artist	AUS	Certifications	Album
"Catching Feelings" (Drax Project featuring Six60)	2019	3	1	43	RMNZ: 9× Platinum; ARIA: 3× Platinum	Drax Project
"Always Beside You" (Coterie featuring Six60)	2022	— (Note: "Always Beside You" did not enter the Official Top 40 Singles Chart, but peaked at number 7 on the Hot 40 Singles Chart.)	11	—	RMNZ: Platinum	Coterie

=== Other charted and certified songs ===
Title	Year	Peak chart positions		Certifications	Album
Title	Year	NZ	NZ Art.	Certifications	Album
"Someone to Be Around"	2008	39	12	RMNZ: 4× Platinum	Six60 (2008 EP)
"Beside You"	2011	—	—	RMNZ: Platinum	Six60
"Finest Wine"	2011	—	5	RMNZ: 5× Platinum	Six60
"Get"	2011	—	—	RMNZ: Gold	Six60
"Green Bottles"	2011	—	—	RMNZ: 3× Platinum	Six60
"Hard for Me"	2011	—	—	RMNZ: Gold	Six60
"Lost"	2011	—	12	RMNZ: Platinum	Six60
"Rest Of You"	2011	—	—	RMNZ: Platinum	Six60
"Run For It"	2011	—	—	RMNZ: Gold	Six60
"Windy Days"	2011	—	—	RMNZ: Platinum	Six60
"Home"	2013	—	9		iTunes Session
"Waterfalls"	2013	—	6		iTunes Session
"Die For"	2015	—	—	RMNZ: Gold	Six60 (2)
"Don't Go Changing"	2015	—	—	RMNZ: Platinum	Six60 (2)
"Fade To Grey"	2015	—	—	RMNZ: Gold	Six60 (2)
"Find My Way"	2015	—	—	RMNZ: Gold	Six60 (2)
"Last Ones Left (Outro)"	2015	—	—	RMNZ: Gold	Six60 (2)
"Marks On The Wall"	2015	—	—	RMNZ: Gold	Six60 (2)
"Mine"	2015	—	—	RMNZ: Gold	Six60 (2)
"Mother's Eyes"	2015	—	—	RMNZ: 3× Platinum	Six60 (2)
"Too Much"	2015	—	—	RMNZ: Gold	Six60 (2)
"Kia Mau Ki Tō Ūkaipō / Don't Forget Your Roots"	2019	10	—	RMNZ: 4× Platinum	Waiata / Anthems
"Bitter End"	2019	—	—	RMNZ: Platinum	Six60 (3)
"Breathe"	2019	—	—	RMNZ: Platinum	Six60 (3)
"Ghosts"	2019	21	—	RMNZ: Platinum	Six60 (3)
"Tomorrow"	2019	28	—	RMNZ: 2× Platinum	Six60 (3)
"Universe"	2019	— (Note: "Universe" did not enter the NZ Top 40 Singles Chart, but peaked at number 12 on the NZ Hot Singles Chart.)	—		Six60 (3)
"Tahi"	2022	— (Note: "Tahi" did not enter the NZ Top 40 Singles Chart, but peaked at number 11 on the NZ Hot Singles Chart.)	—		Castle St
"Hang On"	2022	— (Note: "Hang On" did not enter the NZ Top 40 Singles Chart, but peaked at number eight on the NZ Hot Singles Chart.)	—		Castle St
"Nobody Knows"	2022	— (Note: "Nobody Knows" did not enter the NZ Top 40 Singles Chart, but peaked at number 11 on the NZ Hot Singles Chart.)	—		Castle St
"Say It Now"	2022	— (Note: "Say It Now" did not enter the NZ Top 40 Singles Chart, but peaked at number seven on the NZ Hot Singles Chart.)	—		Castle St
"Pepeha" (live acoustic)	2024	— (Note: "Pepeha" (live acoustic) did not enter the NZ Top 40 Singles Chart, but peaked at number 21 on the NZ Hot Singles Chart.)	—		The Grassroots Album
"Forever" (live acoustic)	2024	— (Note: "Forever" (live acoustic) did not enter the NZ Top 40 Singles Chart, but peaked at number 17 on the NZ Hot Singles Chart.)	—		The Grassroots Album
"Someone to Be Around" (live acoustic)	2024	— (Note: "Someone to Be Around" (live acoustic) did not enter the NZ Top 40 Singles Chart, but peaked at number 18 on the NZ Hot Singles Chart.)	—		The Grassroots Album
"Rivers" (live acoustic)	2024	— (Note: "Rivers" (live acoustic) did not enter the NZ Top 40 Singles Chart, but peaked at number 12 on the NZ Hot Singles Chart.)	—		The Grassroots Album
"Endlessly"	2026	32	—	RMNZ: Gold	Right Here Right Now
"Knocking at Your Door"	2026	— (Note: "Knocking at Your Door" did not enter the NZ Top 40 Singles Chart, but peaked at number 10 on the NZ Hot Singles Chart.)	—		Right Here Right Now
"Enjoy the View"	2026	— (Note: "Enjoy the View" did not enter the NZ Top 40 Singles Chart, but peaked at number 5 on the NZ Hot Singles Chart.)	—		Right Here Right Now
"—" denotes a recording that did not chart in that country.

== Six60: Till the Lights Go Out ==
Six60: Till the Lights Go Out is a 2020 documentary film, directed by Julia Parnell, highlighting the bands humble beginnings to reaching global success.

== Awards and nominations ==
Awards	Year	Type	Song or album	Notes
New Zealand Music Awards	2011	Single of the Year	"Rise Up 2.0"	Nominated
New Zealand Music Awards	2011	Breakthrough Artist of the Year		Nominated
New Zealand Music Awards	2011	Peoples' Choice Award		Nominated
New Zealand Music Awards	2012	Single of the Year	"Don't Forget Your Roots"	Won
New Zealand Music Awards	2012	Best Group		Won
New Zealand Music Awards	2012	Peoples' Choice Award		Won
New Zealand Music Awards	2012	Highest selling New Zealand Single	"Don't Forget Your Roots"	Won
New Zealand Music Awards	2012	Highest selling New Zealand Album	Six60	Won
New Zealand Music Awards	2012	Radio Airplay Record of the Year	"Don't Forget Your Roots"	Won
New Zealand Music Awards	2012	Album of the Year	Six60	Nominated
New Zealand Music Awards	2012	Best Electronica Album	Six60	Nominated
New Zealand Music Awards	2013	Highest selling New Zealand Album	"Six60"	Nominated
New Zealand Music Awards	2015	People's Choice Award		Won
New Zealand Music Awards	2015	Album of the Year	Six60	Nominated
New Zealand Music Awards	2015	Single of the Year	"White Lines"	Nominated
New Zealand Music Awards	2015	Best Group		Nominated
New Zealand Music Awards	2015	Best Pop Album	Six60	Nominated
New Zealand Music Awards	2015	Highest selling New Zealand Single	"Special"	Nominated
New Zealand Music Awards	2015	Highest selling New Zealand Single	"So High"	Nominated
New Zealand Music Awards	2015	Highest selling New Zealand Album	Six60	Nominated
New Zealand Music Awards	2015	Radio Airplay Record of the Year	"Special"	Nominated
New Zealand Music Awards	2016	Highest selling New Zealand Single	"White Lines"	Won
New Zealand Music Awards	2016	Radio Airplay Record of the Year	"White Lines"	Won
New Zealand Music Awards	2016	Highest selling New Zealand Album	Six60	Nominated
New Zealand Music Awards	2017	Highest selling New Zealand Single	"White Lines"	Nominated
New Zealand Music Awards	2017	Highest selling New Zealand Album	Six60	Nominated
New Zealand Music Awards	2018	People's Choice Award		Won
New Zealand Music Awards	2018	Album of the Year	Six60	Nominated
New Zealand Music Awards	2018	Single of the Year	"Don't Give Up"	Nominated
New Zealand Music Awards	2018	Best Group	Six60	Nominated
New Zealand Music Awards	2018	Best Pop Artist		Nominated
New Zealand Music Awards	2018	Highest Selling NZ Album	Six60	Won
New Zealand Music Awards	2018	Highest Selling NZ Single	"Don't Give Up	Won
New Zealand Music Awards	2018	Radio Airplay		Won
New Zealand Music Awards	2019	People's Choice		Won
New Zealand Music Awards	2019	Single of the Year	"The Greatest"	Nominated
New Zealand Music Awards	2019	Highest Selling Artist		Won
New Zealand Music Awards	2019	Radio Airplay		Won
Aotearoa Music Awards	2020	Album of the Year	Six60	Nominated
Aotearoa Music Awards	2020	Single of the Year	"In the Air	Nominated
Aotearoa Music Awards	2020	Best Group		Nominated
Aotearoa Music Awards	2020	Mana Reo	"Kia Mau Ki To Ukaipo"	Nominated
Aotearoa Music Awards	2020	Best Pop Artist		Nominated
Aotearoa Music Awards	2020	Highest Selling Artist		Won
Aotearoa Music Awards	2021	Single of the Year	"All She Wrote"	Nominated
Aotearoa Music Awards	2021	Highest Selling Artist		Won
Aotearoa Music Awards	2021	Radio Airplay		Won
Aotearoa Music Awards	2022	Highest Selling Artist		Won
Aotearoa Music Awards	2022	Radio Airplay	"Someone to be Around"	Won
Aotearoa Music Awards	2024	Highest Selling Artist		Won
