= 2018 New Zealand Music Awards =

Annual New Zealand music awards ceremony

- Awarded for: Excellence in New Zealand music
- Sponsored by: Vodafone
- Date: 15 November 2018
- Location: Spark Arena
- Country: New Zealand
- Reward: Tui award trophy
- Website: http://www.nzmusicawards.co.nz

Television/radio coverage
- Network: Three

The 2018 New Zealand Music Awards was the 52nd holding of the annual ceremony featuring awards for musical recording artists based in or originating from New Zealand. It took place on 15 November 2018 at Spark Arena in Auckland and was hosted by Kanoa Lloyd and Stan Walker. The awards show was broadcast live nationally on Three.
