= Printz Board =

American record producer, songwriter and singer (born 1982)

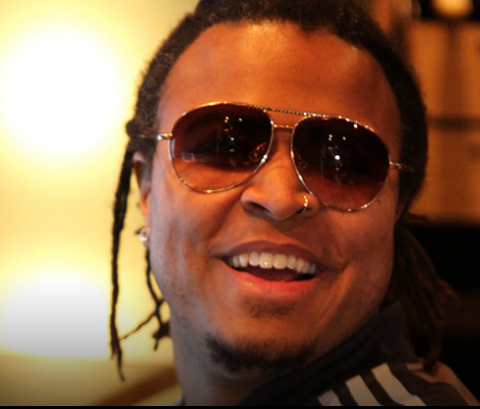

Background information
- Born: Priese Prince Lamonte Board; September 11, 1982 (age 44); Columbus, Ohio, U.S.
- Genres: Hip hop; R&B; pop; rock
- Occupations: Record producer; multi-instrumentalist
- Instruments: Keyboards; trumpet; bass guitar; drums; percussion; flugelhorn; saxophone; french horn; vocals
- Years active: 1997–present
- Labels: Beets & Produce; A&M; Interscope; will.i.am
- Website: printzboard.com

Priese Prince Lamonte "Printz" Board (born September 11, 1982) is an American record producer, songwriter, and singer best known for his work with Black Eyed Peas and being a member of the production group Bucky Jonson. In addition, Board has worked with DJ Mustard, Katy Perry, CeeLo Green, Mark Ronson, Fergie, BTS, Smallpools and John Legend, Kim Dotcom among others.

== Early life ==
Printz is from Columbus, Ohio but moved to Los Angeles at age 10.

== Career ==
After moving to Los Angeles, Printz became a member of a band who would eventually go on to become the Black Eyed Peas. Printz's co-wrote the songs "Where Is the Love?", "Don’t Phunk with My Heart", and "Meet Me Halfway". Besides his co-writing for the Black Eyed Peas, he is the musical director commanding the band's live stadium shows. In 2001, Board founded the production company Beets & Produce, Inc., publishing through Atlas Music Publishing. In 2007 Board and his fellow music group Bucky Jonson released the album The Band Behind The Front on the BBE label.

The inspiration to start his solo career came with the Black Eyed Peas taking a break in 2011. As the artists each took their own separate paths, Printz chose the one that he had been thinking of taking for a while. In the fall of 2013, Printz decided to launch his solo project, beginning with LA and NYC secret shows at the Roxy and S.O.B.’s respectively. He brought on a surprise guest – Natasha Bedingfield - for a special duet of "Mountains". In the span of several months, Printz released an EP Pre-Games, singles "#1" (debut at No.11 in the UK Urban Charts) and Hey You (which was prominently placed in a national Pizza Hut commercial) performed at SXSW, opened for CeeLo Green and Lionel Richie, and received features/premieres on MTV Buzzworthy, USA Today, MetroLyrics, and Singersroom. In the same year Printz Board was one of the top finalists in Macy’s iHeart Radio Rising Star contest.

== Personal life ==
Board has three children.

== Discography ==
As a songwriter, producer, and musician, he has collaborated with Justin Timberlake, Michael Jackson, Busta Rhymes, Chris Brown, Dr. Dre, Fergie, Selena Gomez, Laura Pausini and Katy Perry. Printz Board wrote and/or produced six songs on the deluxe edition of Black Eyed Peas Grammy nominated album "The E.N.D." (2009) including, "Missing You" and "Out Of My Head" (co-producer and writer along with frontman will.i.am). He is writer of "Rockin' to the Beat," "One Tribe," "Where Ya Wanna Go" and "Don't Phunk Around." In addition to Album of the Year, "The E.N.D." was also nominated for The Best Pop Vocal Album at the 52nd Annual Grammy Awards.

Board has worked on the albums The Dutchess (2006) by Fergie, Natasha Bedingfield, 100 Miles from Memphis (2010) by Sheryl Crow, Bashtown (2011) by Baby Bash, and Candy Dulfer’s album titled Crazy (2011), out of the twelve tracks on this album Board produced a total of 7. Board spent six months in New Zealand to work for Kim Dotcom and his Album Good Times which was published 2013 and Keyshia Cole's single "She" from the album Point of No Return (2014) produced by DJ Mustard. Printz produced the album Six60 (Deluxe) from New Zealand’s Six60 (2015), he produced and songwrote for the albums earlier released single "Special" that in 2014 went #1 in New Zealand in its first week.

In 2013, Board launched his solo career releasing the debut single "#1" and "Hey You" through Atlas Music Publishing. In 2014, Board released the single "Mountains", the latest track off his Pre-Games EP.

== Awards and nominations ==
Printz Board has won several Grammy awards and nominations for his work with the Black Eyed Peas.

The E.N.D. won Best Pop Vocal Album in 2010, and "My Humps" won Best Pop Performance by a Duo or Group in 2007.

"Don't Phunk with my Heart" was nominated for Best Rap Song, but instead won Best Rap/Song Collaboration.

"Where Is the Love?" was nominated twice; Record of the Year and Best Rap/Song Collaboration.

Board also won two BMI Songwriter Awards for "Where Is the Love?" and "Meet Me Halfway".
