= New Zealand top 50 singles of 2012 =

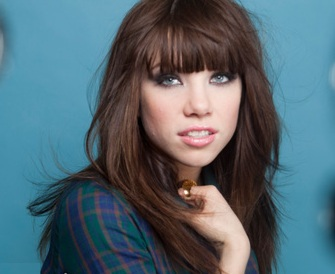
Canadian singer Carly Rae Jepsen's "Call Me Maybe" was the best performing single of 2012 in New Zealand

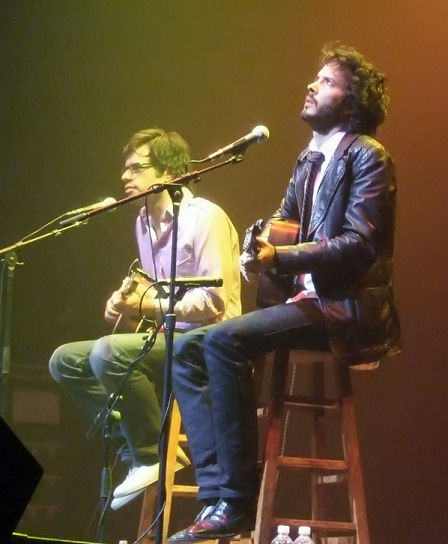
New Zealand comedy duo Flight of the Conchords' charity single "Feel Inside (And Stuff Like That)" was the top selling single by a New Zealand artist

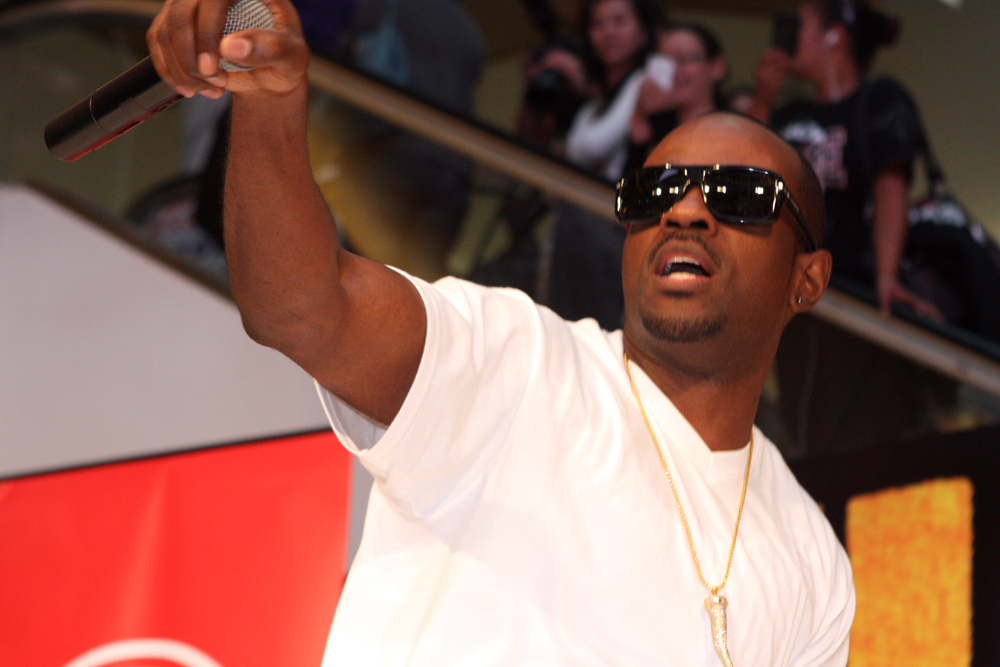
Three songs by American rapper Flo Rida were among the top 50 singles of 2012

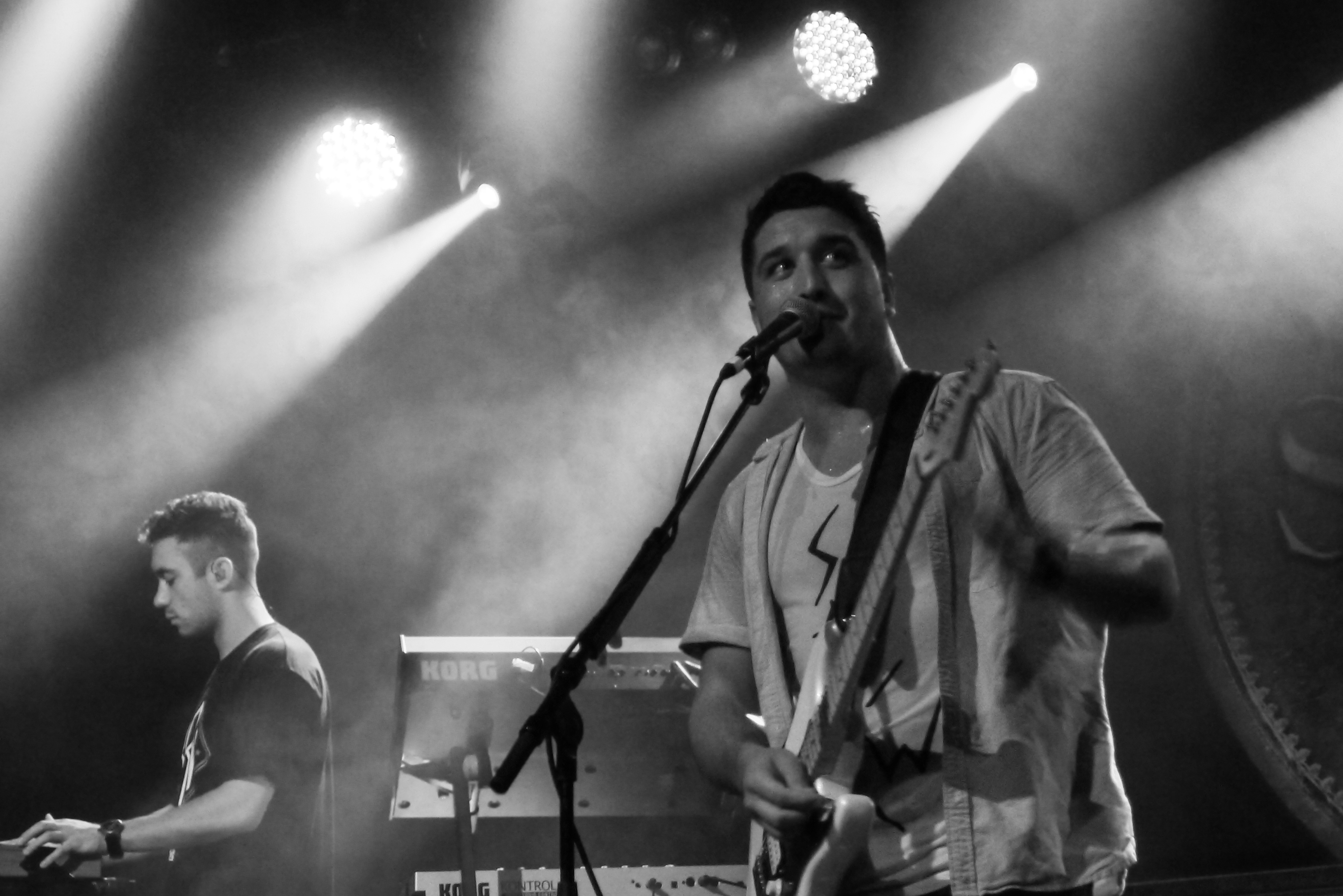
Five songs by New Zealand band Six60 were among the top 20 songs of the year performed by New Zealand musicians

This is a list of the top-selling singles in New Zealand for 2012 from the Official New Zealand Music Chart's end-of-year chart, compiled by Recorded Music NZ.

== Chart ==
Key
† – Song of New Zealand origin (Note: Whether or not a song is of New Zealand origin is determined by the RIANZ)

Rank	Artist	Title
1	Carly Rae Jepsen	"Call Me Maybe" from the extended play, Curiosity and the album, Kiss
2	Psy	"Gangnam Style" from the album, Psy 6 (Six Rules), Part 1
3	Fun featuring Janelle Monáe	"We Are Young" from the album, Some Nights
4	Nicki Minaj	"Starships" from the album, Pink Friday: Roman Reloaded
5	Flo Rida	"Whistle" from the album, Wild Ones
6	Flo Rida featuring Sia	"Wild Ones" from the album, Wild Ones
7	Maroon 5 featuring Wiz Khalifa	"Payphone" from the album, Overexposed
8	Flight of the Conchords	"Feel Inside (And Stuff Like That)"† from the single of the same name
9	Fun	"Some Nights" from the album, Some Nights
10	Macklemore and Ryan Lewis featuring Wanz	"Thrift Shop" from the album, The Heist
11	Gotye featuring Kimbra	"Somebody That I Used to Know"† from the album, Making Mirrors
12	Guy Sebastian featuring Lupe Fiasco	"Battle Scars" from the albums, Armageddon & Lupe Fiasco's Food & Liquor II
13	Maroon 5	"One More Night" from the album, Overexposed
14	Owl City & Carly Rae Jepsen	"Good Time" from the albums, The Midsummer Station & Kiss
15	David Guetta featuring Sia	"Titanium" from the album, Nothing But The Beat
16	Train	"Drive By" from the album, California 37
17	Taylor Swift	"We Are Never Ever Getting Back Together" from the album, Red
18	Justice Crew	"Boom Boom" from the album, Live By The Words
19	The Script featuring will.i.am	"Hall of Fame" from the album, #3
20	Ed Sheeran	"Lego House" from the album, +
21	Annah Mac	"Girl In Stilettos"† from the album, Little Stranger
22	Swedish House Mafia featuring John Martin	"Don't You Worry Child" from the album, Until Now
23	Rihanna	"Diamonds" from the album, Unapologetic
24	Katy Perry	"Wide Awake" from the album, Teenage Dream: The Complete Confection
25	Titanium	"Come On Home"† from the album, All For You
26	Chris Rene	"Young Homie" from the extended play, I'm Right Here
27	Rihanna	"Where Have You Been" from the album, Talk That Talk
28	One Direction	"What Makes You Beautiful" from the album, Up All Night
29	Justin Bieber	"Boyfriend" from the album, Believe
30	Ed Sheeran	"The A Team" from the album, +
31	Reece Mastin	"Good Night" from the album, Reece Mastin
32	Katy Perry	"Part of Me" from the album, Teenage Dream: The Complete Confection
33	Taylor Swift	"I Knew You Were Trouble" from the album, Red
34	Skrillex featuring Sirah	"Bangarang" from the extended play, Bangarang
35	Rudimental featuring John Newman	"Feel the Love" from the album, Home
36	Labrinth featuring Tinie Tempah	"Earthquake" from the album, Electronic Earth
37	Justin Bieber featuring Big Sean	"As Long as You Love Me" from the album, Believe
38	Chris Brown	"Don't Wake Me Up" from the album, Fortune
39	Cher Lloyd featuring Astro	"Want U Back" from the album, Sticks & Stones
40	David Guetta featuring Nicki Minaj	"Turn Me On" from the albums, Nothing But The Beat and Pink Friday: Roman Reloaded
41	Florence and the Machine	"Spectrum (Say My Name)" from the album, Ceremonials
42	The Black Keys	"Lonely Boy" from the album, El Camino
43	Marina and the Diamonds	"Primadonna" from the album, Electra Heart
44	Flo Rida	"I Cry" from the album, Wild Ones
45	Six60	"Forever"† from the album, Six60
46	LMFAO	"Sexy and I Know It" from the album, Sorry For Party Rocking
47	P!nk	"Blow Me (One Last Kiss)" from the album, The Truth About Love
48	Bruno Mars	"Locked Out of Heaven" from the album, Unorthodox Jukebox
49	Coldplay	"Paradise" from the album, Mylo Xyloto
50	Christina Perri	"A Thousand Years" from The Twilight Saga: Breaking Dawn – Part 1 soundtrack

== Top 20 singles of 2012 by New Zealand artists ==
Rank	Artist	Title
1	Flight of the Conchords	"Feel Inside (And Stuff Like That)"
2	Annah Mac	"Girl In Stilettos"
3	Titanium	"Come On Home"
4	Six60	"Forever"
5	Six60	"Only to Be"
6	The Babysitters Circus	"Everything's Gonna Be Alright"
7	Six60	"Don't Forget Your Roots"
8	Aaradhna	"Wake Up"
9	Jamie McDell	"You'll Never Take That Away"
10	Pieter T	"My Baby"
11	Six60 and the Auckland Philharmonia Orchestra	"Lost"
12	Stan Walker	"Music Won't Break Your Heart"
13	Kimbra	"Warrior"
14	Opshop	"Never Leave Me Again"
15	Clara van Wel	"Where Do You Find Love?"
16	Brooke Duff	"Till the End"
17	Tiki Taane	"Over the Rainbow"
18	Jamie McDell	"Life In Sunshine"
19	Gin Wigmore	"Black Sheep"
20	Six60	"Rise Up 2.0"
