= New Zealand top 50 singles of 2011 =

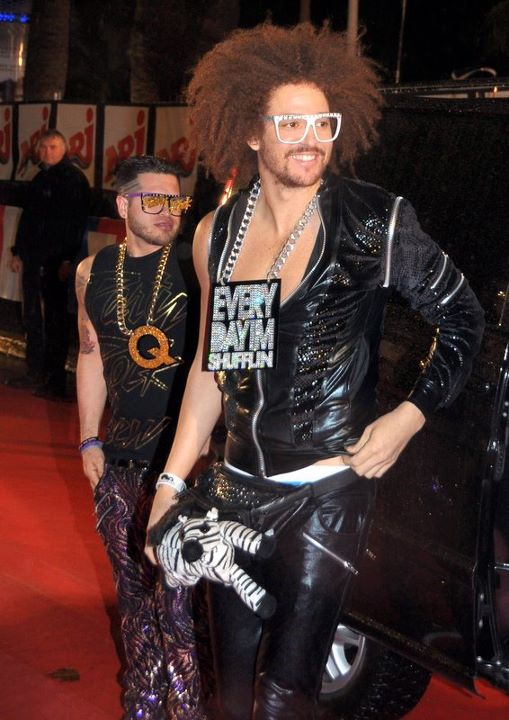
American electronic dance duo LMFAO released the top song of 2011 in New Zealand, "Party Rock Anthem"

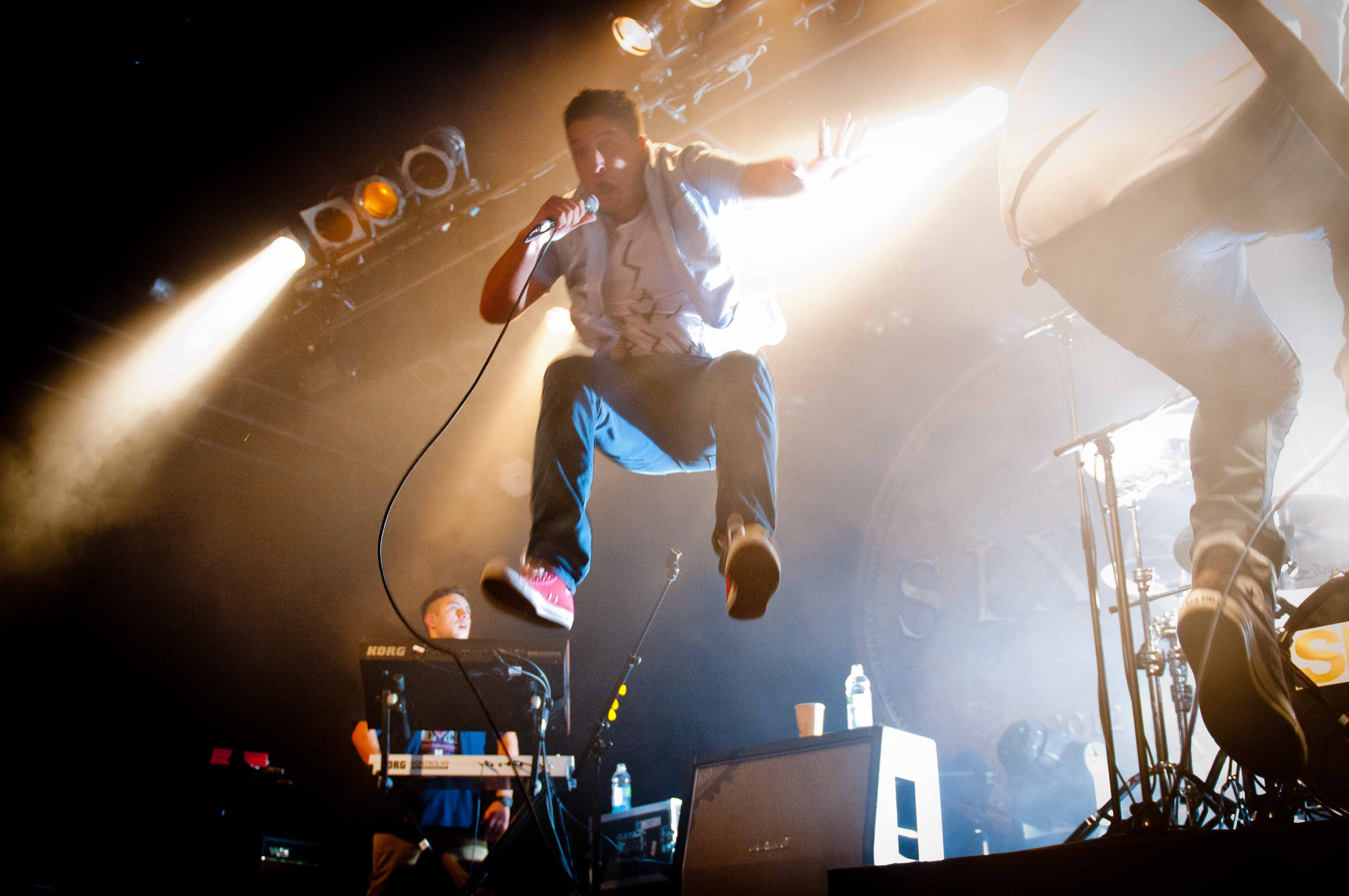
New Zealand band Six60's "Don't Forget Your Roots" was the top song by a New Zealand artist in 2011

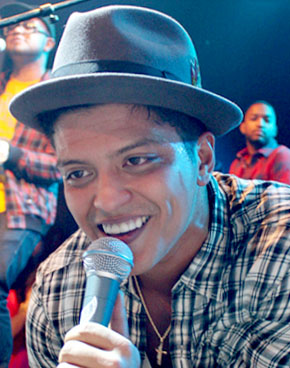
Seven songs featuring American singer Bruno Mars were among the top 50 singles of 2011

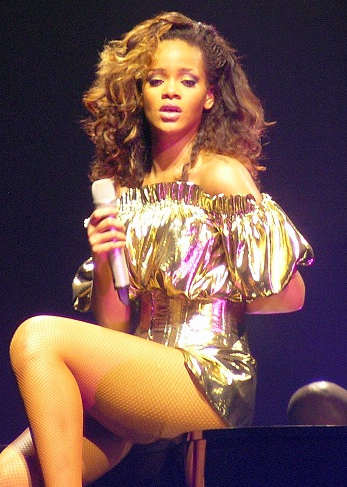
Five songs featuring Barbadian singer Rihanna were in the top 50 songs of the year

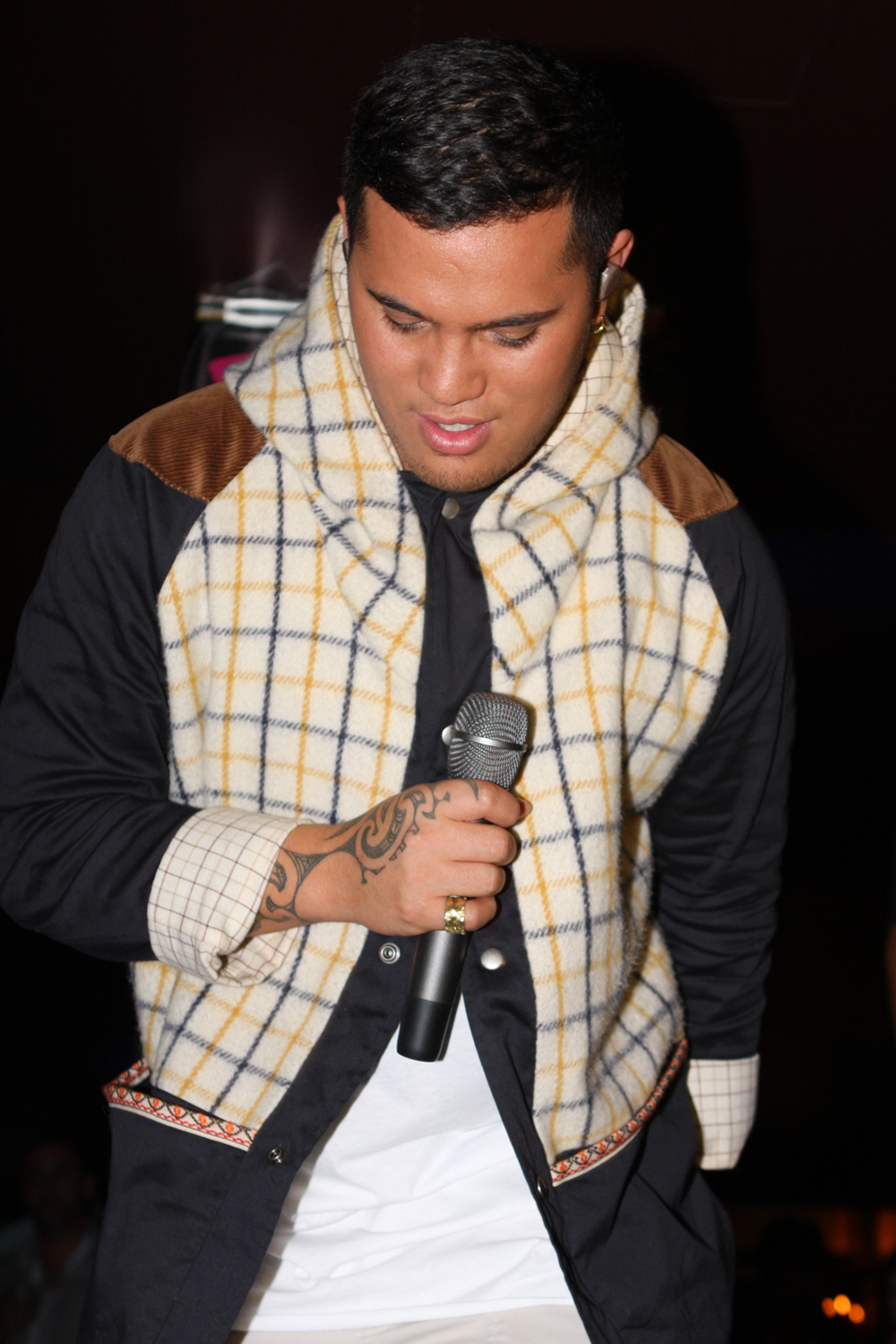
Three songs by Australian/New Zealand singer Stan Walker were among the top 20 songs by New Zealand artists of the year

This is a list of the top-selling singles in New Zealand for 2011 from the Official New Zealand Music Chart's end-of-year chart, compiled by Recorded Music NZ.

== Chart ==
Key
† – Song of New Zealand origin (Note: Whether or not a song is of New Zealand origin is determined by the RIANZ)

Rank	Artist	Title
1	LMFAO featuring GoonRock & Lauren Bennett	"Party Rock Anthem" from the album, Sorry For Party Rocking
2	Maroon 5 featuring Christina Aguilera	"Moves like Jagger" from the album, Hands All Over
3	Gotye featuring Kimbra	"Somebody That I Used to Know"† from the album, Making Mirrors
4	Adele	"Someone Like You" from the album, 21
5	Rihanna featuring Calvin Harris	"We Found Love" from the album, Talk That Talk
6	Adele	"Rolling in the Deep" from the album, 21
7	Jessie J featuring B.o.B	"Price Tag" from the album, Who You Are
8	Pitbull featuring Ne-Yo, Afrojack and Nayer	"Give Me Everything" from the album, Planet Pit
9	Jennifer Lopez featuring Pitbull	"On the Floor" from the album, Love?
10	Six60	"Don't Forget Your Roots"† from the album, Six60
11	LMFAO	"Sexy and I Know It" from the album, Sorry For Party Rocking
12	Bruno Mars	"The Lazy Song" from the album, Doo-Wops & Hooligans
13	Katy Perry featuring Kanye West	"E.T." from the album, Teenage Dream
14	Lady Gaga	"Born This Way" from the album, Born This Way
15	Avalanche City	"Love Love Love"† from the album, Our New Love Above The Ground
16	Jessie J	"Domino" from the album, Who You Are
17	Nicki Minaj	"Super Bass" from the album, Pink Friday
18	Rihanna	"S&M" from the album, Loud
19	Flo Rida	"Good Feeling" from the album, Wild Ones
20	Bruno Mars	"Grenade" from the album, Doo-Wops & Hooligans
21	Cobra Starship featuring Sabi	"You Make Me Feel..." from the album, Night Shades
22	Adele	"Set Fire to the Rain" from the album, 21
23	Ladi6	"Like Water"† from the album, The Liberation Of...
24	Katy Perry	"Last Friday Night (T.G.I.F.)" from the album, Teenage Dream
25	David Guetta featuring Usher	"Without You" from the album, Nothing But The Beat
26	Gym Class Heroes featuring Adam Levine	"Stereo Hearts" from the album, The Papercut Chronicles II
27	Six60	"Rise Up 2.0"† from the album, Six60
28	One Direction	"What Makes You Beautiful" from the album, Up All Night
29	Bruno Mars	"It Will Rain" from The Twilight Saga: Breaking Dawn – Part 1 soundtrack
30	Rihanna	"Cheers (Drink to That)" from the album, Loud
31	Katy Perry	"Firework" from the album, Teenage Dreams
32	Coldplay	"Paradise" from the album, Mylo Xyloto
33	Foster the People	"Pumped Up Kicks" from the extended play, Foster The People & the album, Torches
34	Chris Brown	"Yeah 3x" from the album, F.A.M.E.
35	Snoop Dogg vs. David Guetta	"Sweat" from the album, Nothing But The Beat
36	Guy Sebastian featuring Eve	"Who's That Girl?" from the album, Twenty Two
37	The Black Eyed Peas	"Just Can't Get Enough" from the album, The Beginning
38	Enrique Iglesias featuring Ludacris & DJ Frank E	"Tonight (I'm Fuckin' You)" from the album, Euphoria
39	Bruno Mars	"Marry You" from the album, Doo-Wops & Hooligans
40	Lady Gaga	"The Edge of Glory" from the album, Born This Way
41	Calvin Harris	"Feel So Close" from the album, 18 Months
42	Bruno Mars	"Count On Me" from the album, Doo-Wops & Hooligans
43	Rihanna	"California King Bed" from the album, Loud
44	David Guetta featuring Rihanna	"Who's That Chick?" from the album, One More Love
45	P!nk	"Fuckin' Perfect" from the album, Greatest Hits... So Far!!!
46	Wiz Khalifa and Snoop Dogg featuring Bruno Mars	"Young, Wild & Free" from the Mac & Devin Go To High School soundtrack
47	Diddy – Dirty Money featuring Skylar Grey	"Coming Home" from the album, Last Train To Paris
48	Bruno Mars	"Just The Way You Are" from the album, Doo-Wops & Hooligans
49	David Guetta featuring Flo Rida and Nicki Minaj	"Where Them Girls At" from the album, Nothing but the Beat
50	Jason Derulo	"It Girl" from the album, Future History

== Top 20 singles of 2011 by New Zealand artists ==
Rank	Artist	Title
1	Six60	"Don't Forget Your Roots"
2	Avalanche City	"Love Love Love"
3	Ladi6	"Like Water"
4	Six60	"Rise Up 2.0"
5	The Babysitters Circus	"Everything's Gonna Be Alright"
6	Six60	"Only to Be"
7	Stan Walker	"Loud"
8	Gin Wigmore	"Black Sheep"
9	Brooke Fraser	"Something in the Water"
10	Annah Mac	"Girl In Stilettos"
11	Bulletproof featuring Jessie G	"Dub Me Crazy"
12	Opshop	"Love Will Always Win"
13	Stan Walker	"Light It Up"
14	Annabel Fay	"Show Me The Right Way"
15	Brooke Fraser	"Betty"
16	K.One featuring J.Williams	"She's a Killer"
17	The Naked and Famous	"Young Blood"
18	Annabel Fay	"River"
19	Pātea Māori Club	"Poi E"
20	Stan Walker	"Homesick"
