= New Zealand top 50 singles of 2016 =

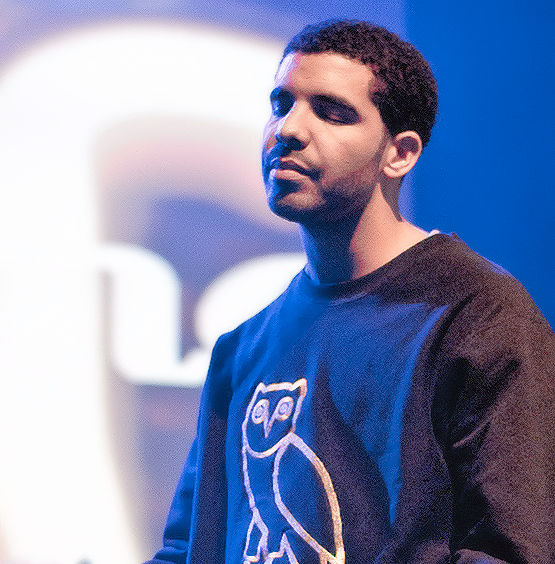
Canadian rapper Drake released the best performing song of the year

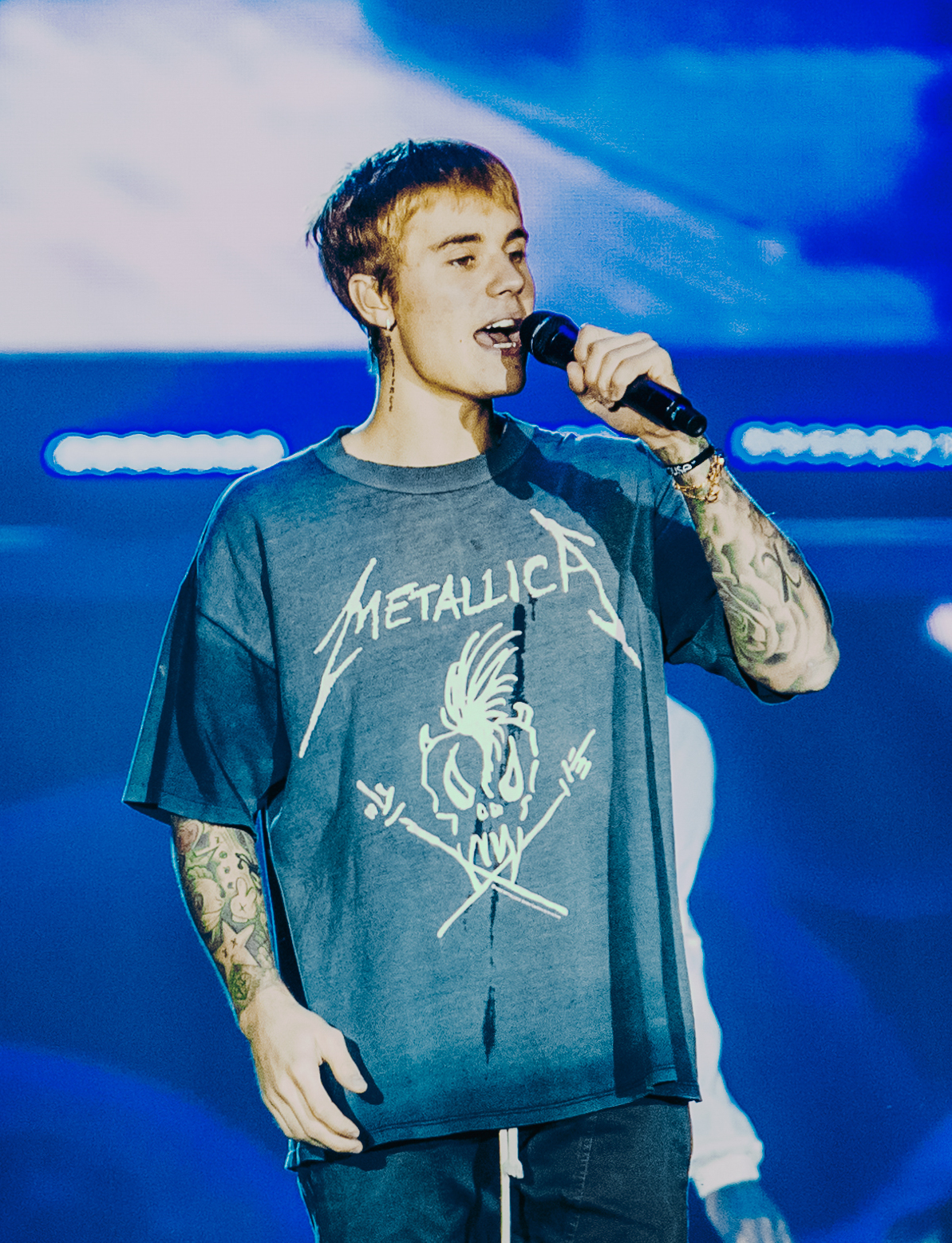
Five songs released by Canadian singerJustin Bieber were among the top 50 singles of 2016

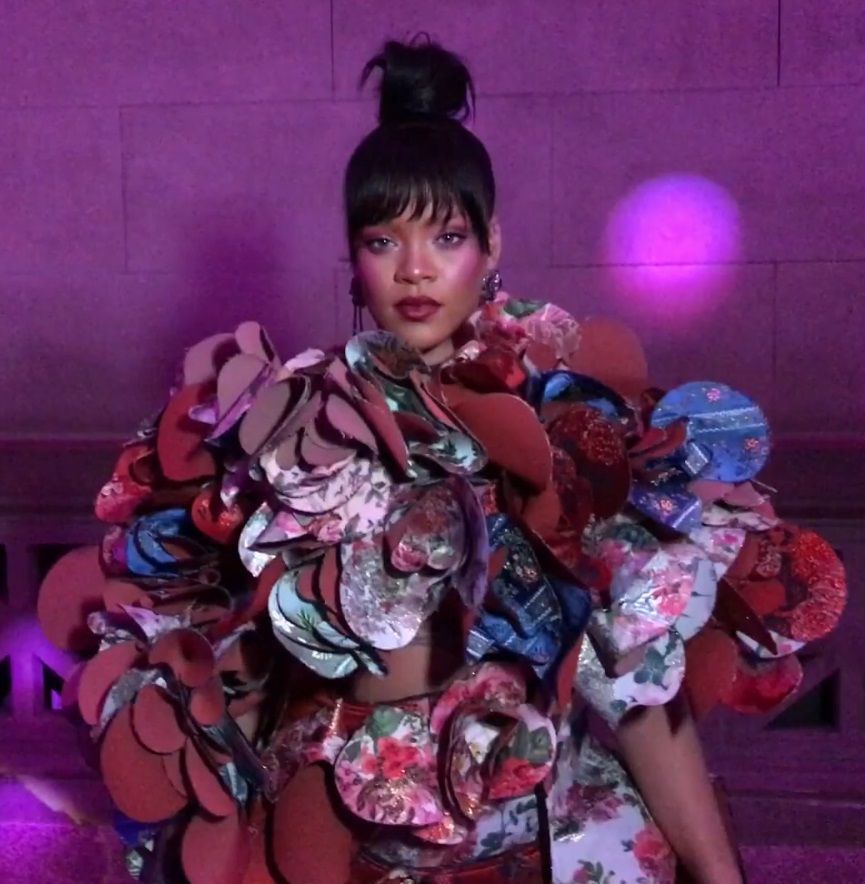
Barbadian singer Rihanna was featured in four of the top 50 songs of the year

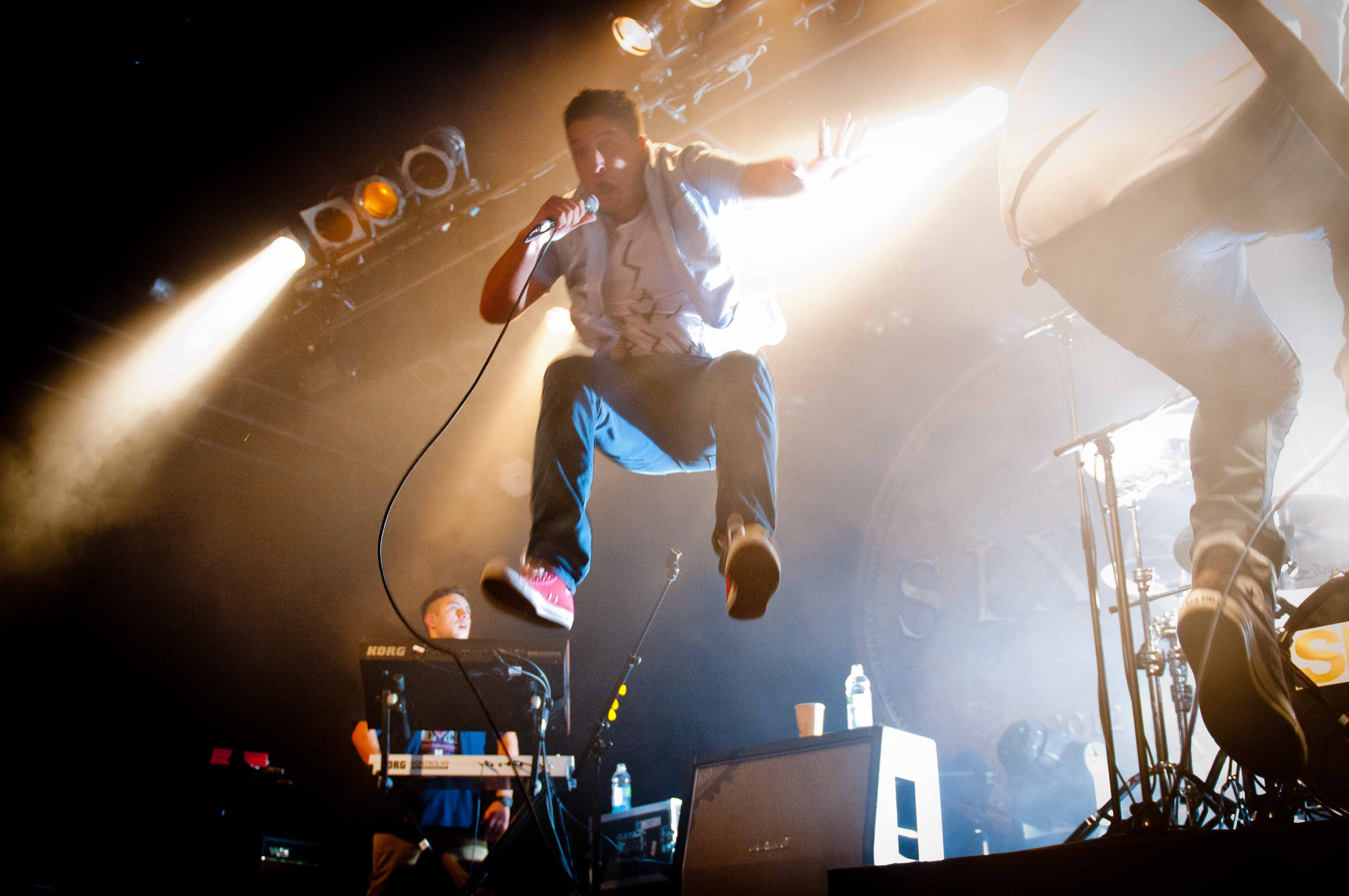
New Zealand band Six60 released nine of the best performing songs by New Zealand artists of 2016

This is a list of the top-selling singles in New Zealand for 2016 from the Official New Zealand Music Chart's end-of-year chart, compiled by Recorded Music NZ. Canadian singer-songwriter Justin Bieber appeared in five songs each in the chart and Barbadian singer Rihanna four, whether it was their own single or as a featured artist respectively. The chart was topped by Drake featuring Wizkid & Kyla's song "One Dance". The only song by a New Zealand artist or group to chart was the Kings single, "Don't Worry Bout It".

== Chart ==
Key
† – Song of New Zealand origin (Note: Whether or not a song is of New Zealand origin is determined by the RIANZ)

Rank	Artist	Song
1	Drake featuring Wizkid & Kyla	"One Dance"
2	Lukas Graham	"7 Years"
3	Justin Bieber	"Love Yourself"
4	Flume featuring Kai	"Never Be like You"
5	The Chainsmokers featuring Halsey	"Closer"
6	The Chainsmokers featuring Daya	"Don't Let Me Down"
7	Justin Bieber	"Sorry"
8	Sia	"Cheap Thrills"
9	Jonas Blue featuring Dakota	"Fast Car"
10	Calvin Harris featuring Rihanna	"This Is What You Came For"
11	Twenty One Pilots	"Stressed Out"
12	Mike Posner	"I Took a Pill in Ibiza"
13	Major Lazer featuring Justin Bieber	"Cold Water"
14	Snakehips featuring Tinashe & Chance the Rapper	"All My Friends"
15	Justin Timberlake	"Can't Stop the Feeling!"
16	Fifth Harmony featuring Ty Dolla Sign	"Work from Home"
17	Alan Walker	"Faded"
18	Rihanna featuring Drake	"Work"
19	Zayn	"Pillowtalk"
20	Zara Larsson	"Lush Life"
21	Flume featuring Tove Lo	"Say It"
22	The Chainsmokers featuring Rozes	"Roses"
23	DJ Snake featuring Justin Bieber	"Let Me Love You"
24	Twenty One Pilots	"Heathens"
25	Desiigner	"Panda"
26	DJ Snake featuring Bipolar Sunshine	"Middle"
27	Adele	"Hello"
28	Drake featuring Rihanna	"Too Good"
29	Justin Bieber	"What Do You Mean?"
30	DNCE	"Cake by the Ocean"
31	Adele	"Send My Love (To Your New Lover)"
32	G-Eazy & Bebe Rexha	"Me, Myself & I"
33	Kings	"Don't Worry Bout It"†
34	Kiiara	"Gold"
35	The Weeknd featuring Daft Punk	"Starboy"
36	Major Lazer featuring Nyla	"Light It Up"
37	Charlie Puth featuring Selena Gomez	"We Don't Talk Anymore"
38	Gnash featuring Olivia O'Brien	"I Hate U, I Love U"
39	Rihanna	"Needed Me"
40	Twenty One Pilots	"Ride"
41	Alessia Cara	"Wild Things"
42	Zara Larsson and MNEK	"Never Forget You"
43	Selena Gomez	"Hands To Myself"
44	Duke Dumont	"Ocean Drive"
45	Ariana Grande featuring Nicki Minaj	"Side to Side"
46	James Arthur	"Say You Won't Let Go"
47	Shawn Mendes	"Stitches"
48	Robin Schulz featuring Francesco Yates	"Sugar"
49	Hailee Steinfeld & Grey featuring Zedd	"Starving"
50	Shawn Mendes	"Treat You Better"

== Top 20 singles of 2016 by New Zealand artists ==
Rank	Artist	Song
1	Kings	"Don't Worry Bout It"
2	Broods	"Free"
3	Disclosure featuring Lorde	"Magnets"
4	Six60	"White Lines"
5	Six60	"Purple"
6	Six60	"Special"
7	Six60	"So High"
8	Nomad	"Oh My My"
9	Six60	"Stay Together"
10	Six60	"Mother's Eyes"
11	Timmy Trumpet featuring Savage	"Freaks"
12	Six60	"Don't Forget Your Roots"
13	Six60	"Only to Be"
14	Shapeshifter	"Stars"
15	Lorde	"Royals"
16	Maala	"Kind of Love"
17	Fat Freddy's Drop	"Wandering Eye"
18	Six60	"Forever"
19	Broods	"Heartlines"
20	Avalanche City	"Inside Out"
