= 2012 in New Zealand music =

The following is a list of notable events that have happened in 2012 in music in New Zealand.

== Events ==
=== July ===
On July 28, Colin Horsley died.

=== September ===
- Herbs (band) and Toy Love were inducted into the New Zealand Music Hall of Fame.

=== October ===
- The 2012 New Zealand Music Awards took place on October 3. The ceremony awarded 26 awards for various musical accomplishments.

Concord Dawn's Air Chrysalis won the 2012 New Zealand Music Award for Best Electronica Album

== Deaths ==
- July 28 – Colin Horsley, pianist and educator, 92

== See also ==
- New Zealand top 50 singles of 2012
- New Zealand top 50 albums of 2012
