= New Zealand top 50 albums of 2012 =

This is a list of the top-selling albums in New Zealand for 2012 from the Official New Zealand Music Chart's end-of-year chart, compiled by Recorded Music NZ.

== Chart ==
Key
‡ – Album of New Zealand origin

Rank	Artist	Title
1	Adele	21
2	Ed Sheeran	+
3	One Direction	Up All Night
4	Mumford & Sons	Babel
5	The Black Keys	El Camino
6	Taylor Swift	Red
7	Rod Stewart	Merry Christmas, Baby
8	Six60	Six60^{‡}
9	One Direction	Take Me Home
10	Pink	The Truth About Love
11	Lana Del Rey	Born To Die
12	Susan Boyle	Standing Ovation: The Greatest Songs from the Stage
13	Michael Bublé	Christmas
14	Led Zeppelin	Celebration Day
15	Bruno Mars	Doo-Wops & Hooligans
16	Skrillex	Bangarang
17	Coldplay	Mylo Xyloto
18	Peter Posa	White Rabbit: The Very Best Of Peter Posa^{‡}
19	Fun	Some Nights
20	Whitney Houston	The Ultimate Collection
21	Reece Mastin	Reece Mastin
22	Katy Perry	Teenage Dream
23	Frankie Valli and the Four Seasons	Jersey's Best: The Very Best of Frankie Valli and the Four Seasons
24	Rod Stewart	Storyteller – The Complete Anthology: 1964–1990
25	Kimbra	Vows^{‡}
26	Florence and the Machine	Ceremonials
27	Gin Wigmore	Gravel & Wine^{‡}
28	Justin Bieber	Believe
29	Leonard Cohen	Old Ideas
30	Maroon 5	Overexposed
31	The Rolling Stones	GRRR!
32	Amy Winehouse	Lioness: Hidden Treasures
33	Linkin Park	Living Things
34	Bee Gees	Mythology
35	LMFAO	Sorry for Party Rocking
36	Mumford & Sons	Sigh No More
37	Adele	19
38	Karise Eden	My Journey
39	Dennis Marsh	Sounds of the Pacific^{‡}
40	Bruno Mars	Unorthodox Jukebox
41	Mark Knopfler	Privateering
42	Nicki Minaj	Pink Friday: Roman Reloaded
43	David Guetta	Nothing but the Beat
44	Slash and Myles Kennedy	Apocalyptic Love
45	Home Brew	Home Brew^{‡}
46	Fleetwood Mac	25 Years – The Chain
47	Jersey Boys original Broadway cast	Jersey Boys: Original Broadway Cast Recording
48	Skrillex	Scary Monsters and Nice Sprites
49	Kora	Light Years^{‡}
50	Foo Fighters	Wasting Light
