= List of number-one hits of 2012 (Austria) =

This is a list of the Austrian number-one singles and albums of 2012 as compiled by Ö3 Austria Top 40, the official chart provider of Austria.

Issue date	Song	Artist	Album	Artist
6 January	"Hangover"	Taio Cruz featuring Flo Rida	Christmas	Michael Bublé
13 January	"Somebody That I Used to Know"	Gotye featuring Kimbra	21	Adele
20 January	"Somebody That I Used to Know"	Gotye featuring Kimbra	Neujahrskonzert 2012	Vienna Philharmonic / Mariss Jansons
27 January	"Ai Se Eu Te Pego!"	Michel Teló	Neujahrskonzert 2012	Vienna Philharmonic / Mariss Jansons
3 February	"Ai Se Eu Te Pego!"	Michel Teló	Neujahrskonzert 2012	Vienna Philharmonic / Mariss Jansons
10 February	"Ai Se Eu Te Pego!"	Michel Teló	Born to Die	Lana Del Rey
17 February	"Ai Se Eu Te Pego!"	Michel Teló	Danke für's Zuhören – Liedersammlung 1998–2012	Xavier Naidoo
24 February	"Ai Se Eu Te Pego!"	Michel Teló	Narrow	Soap&Skin
2 March	"Ai Se Eu Te Pego!"	Michel Teló	The Ultimate Collection	Whitney Houston
9 March	"Ai Se Eu Te Pego!"	Michel Teló	The Ultimate Collection	Whitney Houston
16 March	"She Doesn't Mind"	Sean Paul	Wrecking Ball	Bruce Springsteen
23 March	"Ai se eu te pego!"	Michel Teló	Wrecking Ball	Bruce Springsteen
30 March	"She Doesn't Mind"	Sean Paul	Lichter der Stadt	Unheilig
6 April	"Don't Gimme That"	The BossHoss	Lichter der Stadt	Unheilig
13 April	"Don't Gimme That"	The BossHoss	Lichter der Stadt	Unheilig
20 April	"Don't Gimme That"	The BossHoss	Lichter der Stadt	Unheilig
27 April	"We Are Young"	Fun. featuring Janelle Monáe	Auch	Die Ärzte
4 May	"We Are Young"	Fun. featuring Janelle Monáe	Auch	Die Ärzte
11 May	"Don't Think About Me"	Luca Hänni	...Little Broken Hearts	Norah Jones
18 May	"We Are Young"	Fun. featuring Janelle Monáe	Ballast der Republik	Die Toten Hosen
25 May	"Back in Time"	Pitbull	Ballast der Republik	Die Toten Hosen
1 June	"Back in Time"	Pitbull	My Name is Luca	Luca Hänni
8 June	"Euphoria"	Loreen	Crazy	Daniele Negroni
15 June	"Euphoria"	Loreen	Grundlsee	Seer
22 June	"Euphoria"	Loreen	Life in a Beautiful Light	Amy Macdonald
29 June	"Tacata'"	Tacabro	Believe	Justin Bieber
6 July	"Tacata'"	Tacabro	Living Things	Linkin Park
13 July	"Tacata'"	Tacabro	Living Things	Linkin Park
20 July	"Tacata'"	Tacabro	Raop	Cro
27 July	"Tacata'"	Tacabro	Raop	Cro
3 August	"I Follow Rivers"	Triggerfinger	Come On Let's Dance - Best Of Remix	Nik P.
10 August	"I Follow Rivers"	Triggerfinger	Raop	Cro
17 August	"Don't Wake Me Up"	Chris Brown	Bis ans Ende der Zeit	Amigos
24 August	"I Follow Rivers"	Triggerfinger	Bis ans Ende der Zeit	Amigos
31 August	"One Day / Reckoning Song (Wankelmut Remix)"	Asaf Avidan	Bis ans Ende der Zeit	Amigos
7 September	"One Day / Reckoning Song (Wankelmut Remix)"	Asaf Avidan	Havoc and Bright Lights	Alanis Morissette
14 September	"One Day / Reckoning Song (Wankelmut Remix)"	Asaf Avidan	Privateering	Mark Knopfler
21 September	"One Day / Reckoning Song (Wankelmut Remix)"	Asaf Avidan	Tempest	Bob Dylan
28 September	"One Day / Reckoning Song (Wankelmut Remix)"	Asaf Avidan	The Truth About Love	Pink
5 October	"One Day / Reckoning Song (Wankelmut Remix)"	Asaf Avidan	¡Uno!	Green Day
12 October	"Gangnam Style"	PSY	The 2nd Law	Muse
19 October	"Gangnam Style"	PSY	Leben und leben lassen	Kastelruther Spatzen
26 October	"Gangnam Style"	PSY	Volksrock'n'Roller - Live	Andreas Gabalier
2 November	"Diamonds"	Rihanna	Volksrock'n'Roller - Live	Andreas Gabalier
9 November	"Diamonds"	Rihanna	Kiddy Contest Vol. 18	Kiddy Contest Kids
16 November	"Diamonds"	Rihanna	Take the Crown	Robbie Williams
23 November	"Gangnam Style"	PSY	GRRR!	The Rolling Stones
30 November	"Diamonds"	Rihanna	Bis ans Meer	Nik P.
7 December	"Girl on Fire"	Alicia Keys	La sesión cubana	Zucchero Sugar Fornaciari
14 December	"Girl on Fire"	Alicia Keys	Christmas	Michael Bublé
21 December	"Girl on Fire"	Alicia Keys	Christmas	Michael Bublé
28 December	No Top 40 released			
