= The Ultimate Collection (Whitney Houston album) =

Greatest hits album by Whitney Houston
- Released: October 29, 2007
- Length: 79:35
- Label: Arista
- Producers: David Foster; Babyface; Narada Michael Walden; L.A. Reid; Rodney Jerkins; Wyclef Jean; Jerry 'Wonder' Duplessis; Clivilles and Cole; George Michael; Michael Masser

Whitney Houston chronology
One Wish: The Holiday Album (2003)	The Ultimate Collection (2007)	I Look to You (2009)

Professional ratings
Review scores
Source	Rating
Allmusic	4/5 stars
Digital Spy	3/5 stars

The Ultimate Collection is a greatest hits collection by Whitney Houston, released on October 29, 2007. In Brazil, the album was released as Whitney Houston – The Best So Far. In 2011, it was reissued as All Time Best - Reclam Musik Edition in Germany and Switzerland.

Unlike the North American edition of her previous singles compilation, Whitney: The Greatest Hits, the upbeat and dance-oriented songs—with the exception of "I'm Your Baby Tonight"—are not remixed and contain the original version of those songs (although a few of the songs appear here as their radio / single edits). The Ultimate Collection was not released in North American territories.

== Track listing ==
=== Album ===
No.	Title	Writer(s)	Length
1.	"I Will Always Love You" (edit)	Dolly Parton	4:27
2.	"Saving All My Love for You"	Gerry Goffin; Michael Masser	3:45
3.	"Greatest Love of All"	Masser; Linda Creed	4:46
4.	"One Moment in Time"	Albert Hammond; John Bettis	4:46
5.	"I Wanna Dance with Somebody (Who Loves Me)"	George Merrill; Shannon Rubicam	4:49
6.	"How Will I Know"	Merrill; Rubicam; Narada Michael Walden	4:33
7.	"So Emotional"	Billy Steinberg; Tom Kelly	4:31
8.	"When You Believe" (duet with Mariah Carey)	Stephen Schwartz; Babyface	4:32
9.	"Where Do Broken Hearts Go"	Frank Wildhorn; Chuck Jackson	4:38
10.	"I'm Your Baby Tonight" (U.K. version)	L.A. Reid; Babyface	4:10
11.	"Didn't We Almost Have It All" (single version)	Masser; Will Jennings	4:35
12.	"Run to You"	Allan Rich; Jud Friedman	4:27
13.	"Exhale (Shoop Shoop)"	Babyface	3:25
14.	"If I Told You That" (radio edit; duet with George Michael)	Rodney Jerkins; Fred Jerkins III; LaShawn Daniels; Toni Estes	4:05
15.	"I Have Nothing"	David Foster; Linda Thompson	4:51
16.	"I'm Every Woman"	Nickolas Ashford; Valerie Simpson	4:39
17.	"It's Not Right but It's Okay"	Jerkins; Jerkins III; Daniels; Isaac Phillips; Estes	4:40
18.	"My Love Is Your Love" (edit)	Wyclef Jean; Jerry Duplessis	3:56
Total length:			76:35

=== DVD ===
Music videos
No.	Title	Length
1.	"You Give Good Love"
2.	"Saving All My Love for You"
3.	"How Will I Know"
4.	"Greatest Love of All"
5.	"I Wanna Dance with Somebody (Who Loves Me)"
6.	"Didn't We Almost Have It All"
7.	"So Emotional"
8.	"Where Do Broken Hearts Go"
9.	"I'm Your Baby Tonight"
10.	"All the Man That I Need"
11.	"The Star Spangled Banner" (Live at the Super Bowl XXV, January 27, 1991)
12.	"I Will Always Love You"
13.	"Exhale (Shoop Shoop)"
14.	"I Believe in You and Me"
15.	"I'm Every Woman"
16.	"I Have Nothing"
17.	"Run to You"
18.	"Queen of the Night"
19.	"Step by Step"
20.	"Heartbreak Hotel"
21.	"My Love Is Your Love"
22.	"It's Not Right But It's Okay"
23.	"I Learned from the Best"

Bonus content
No.	Title	Length
1.	"Home" (Live on The Merv Griffin Show, June 23, 1983)
2.	"Lover for Life" (The Concert for a New South Africa, November 12, 1994)
3.	"One Moment in Time" (Live from the 1989 Grammy Awards)
4.	"My Love Is Your Love: The Making of an Album"
5.	"My Love Is Your Love" (Live from Mannheim, Germany, August 28, 1999)
6.	"Why Does It Hurt So Bad" (Live from the 1996 MTV Movie Awards)
7.	"It's Not Right But It's Okay" (from MTV All Access, July 7, 1999)
8.	"Interviews with Whitney and Clive Davis"
9.	"Behind-the-scenes footage from the Greatest Hits photo shoot"
10.	"Song lyrics"

== Personnel ==
- Nick Ashford — composer
- John "Jellybean" Benitez — producer
- John Bettis — composer
- Paul Boutin — engineer
- Mariah Carey — vocals
- Dana Chappelle — vocal engineer
- Linda Creed — composer
- LaShawn Daniels — composer
- Clive Davis — executive producer
- Gary Chanel Debique — design
- Jon Douglas — mixing
- Jerry Duplessis — composer, producer
- Kenneth "Babyface" Edmonds — drum programming, executive producer, keyboards, producer, composer
- Toni Estes — composer
- David Foster — composer
- Jud J. Friedman — composer
- Jon Gass — mixing
- Brad Gilderman — engineer
- Gerry Goffin — composer
- Albert Hammond — composer
- Whitney Houston — executive producer, vocal arrangement
- Chuck Jackson — composer
- Wyclef Jean — composer, producer
- Will Jennings — composer
- Rodney Jerkins — composer, instrumentation, producer
- Tom Kelly — composer
- Larry Lachmann — mastering
- Harvey Mason Jr. — digital editing
- Michael Masser — composer, producer
- George Merrill — composer
- George Michael — producer
- Dolly Parton — composer
- Isaac Phillips — composer
- L.A. Reid — composer, producer
- Allan Rich — composer
- Shannon Rubicam — composer
- Stephen Schwartz — composer
- Dexter Simmons — remixing
- Valerie Simpson — composer
- Billy Steinberg — composer
- Ren Swan — mixing
- Linda Thompson-Jenner — composer
- Narada Michael Walden — arranger, producer
- Frank Wildhorn — composer

== Charts ==
=== Weekly charts ===
2007–2010 weekly chart performance for The Ultimate Collection
Chart (2007–2010)	Peak position
Australian Albums (ARIA)	24
Austrian Albums (Ö3 Austria)	12
Belgian Albums (Ultratop Wallonia)	77
Danish Albums (Hitlisten)	4
Finnish Albums (Suomen virallinen lista)	16
French Albums (SNEP)	52
German Albums (Offizielle Top 100)	39
Greek International Albums (IFPI)	15
Japanese Albums (Oricon)	10
New Zealand Albums (RMNZ)	9
Norwegian Albums (VG-lista)	4
Scottish Albums (Official Charts)	7
South Korean Albums (Circle)	20
Spanish Albums (Promusicae)	28
Swedish Albums (Sverigetopplistan)	10
Swiss Albums (Schweizer Hitparade)	70
UK Albums (Official Charts)	3
UK R&B Albums (Official Charts)	1

2012–2013 weekly chart performance for The Ultimate Collection
Chart (2012–2013)	Peak position
Australian Albums (ARIA)	3
Austrian Albums (Ö3 Austria)	1
Danish Albums (Hitlisten)	4
Finnish Albums (Suomen virallinen lista)	25
French Albums (SNEP)	52
German Albums (Offizielle Top 100)	3
Hungarian Albums (MAHASZ)	8
Italian Albums (FIMI)	5
New Zealand Albums (RMNZ)	2
Norwegian Albums (VG-lista)	4
Russian Albums (Lenta.ru)	19
Scottish Albums (Official Charts)	4
South African Albums (SA Top 20)	18
South Korean Albums (Circle)	21
Spanish Albums (Promusicae)	71
Swiss Albums (Schweizer Hitparade)	5
Swiss Music DVD (Schweizer Hitparade)	3
UK Albums (Official Charts)	62
UK R&B Albums (Official Charts)	24

2019–2020 weekly chart performance for The Ultimate Collection
Chart (2019–2020)	Peak position
Belgian Albums (Ultratop Flanders)	133
Belgian Albums (Ultratop Wallonia)	91

2023 weekly chart performance for The Ultimate Collection
Chart (2023)	Peak position
Polish Albums (ZPAV)	3

2012 weekly chart performance for All Time Best - Reclam Musik Edition
Chart (2012)	Peak position
German Albums (Offizielle Top 100)	76
Swiss Albums (Schweizer Hitparade)	24

=== Monthly charts ===
2012 monthly chart performance for The Ultimate Collection
Chart (2012)	Peak position
Polish Albums (ZPAV)	20

=== Year-end charts ===
2007 year-end chart performance for The Ultimate Collection
Chart (2007)	Peak position
UK Albums (OCC)	25

2012 year-end chart performance for The Ultimate Collection
Chart (2012)	Peak position
Australian Albums (ARIA)	66
Australian Urban Albums (ARIA)	9
Austrian Albums (Ö3 Austria)	22
German Albums (Offizielle Top 100)	75
Italian Albums (FIMI)	51
New Zealand Albums (RMNZ)	15
South Korean International Albums (Circle)	41
UK Albums (OCC)	67

2014 year-end chart performance for The Ultimate Collection
Chart (2014)	Peak position
Australian Urban Albums (ARIA)	27
UK Albums (OCC)	63

2015 year-end chart performance for The Ultimate Collection
Chart (2015)	Peak position
Australian Urban Albums (ARIA)	96
UK Albums (OCC)	92

2017 year-end chart performance for The Ultimate Collection
Chart (2017)	Peak position
UK Albums (OCC)	80

2018 year-end chart performance for The Ultimate Collection
Chart (2018)	Peak position
UK Albums (OCC)	88

2019 year-end chart performance for The Ultimate Collection
Chart (2019)	Peak position
UK Albums (OCC)	72

2020 year-end chart performance for The Ultimate Collection
Chart (2020)	Peak position
UK Albums (OCC)	42

=== Decade-end charts ===
2010–2020 decade-end chart performance for The Ultimate Collection
Chart	Peak position
UK Albums (OCC)	52

=== All-time charts ===
All-time chart performance for The Ultimate Collection
Chart	Peak position
Irish Albums – Female (OCC)	25

== Certifications and sales ==
=== Album ===
Region	Certification	Certified units/sales
Australia (ARIA)	2× Platinum	140,000^{^}
Belgium (BRMA)	Gold	15,000^{*}
Denmark (IFPI Danmark)	4× Platinum	80,000^{‡}
Finland (Musiikkituottajat)	Gold	19,916
Germany (BVMI)	2× Platinum	400,000^{‡}
Hungary (MAHASZ)	Gold	3,000^{^}
Ireland (IRMA)	2× Platinum	30,000^{^}
Italy (FIMI)	Platinum	50,000^{*}
New Zealand (RMNZ)	2× Platinum	30,000^{‡}
Russia (NFPF)	Gold	10,000^{*}
Sweden (GLF)	Gold	20,000^{^}
Switzerland (IFPI Switzerland)	Gold	15,000^{^}
United Kingdom (BPI)	6× Platinum	1,800,000^{‡}
^{*} Sales figures based on certification alone.^{^} Shipments figures based on certification alone.^{‡} Sales+streaming figures based on certification alone.

=== DVD ===
Region	Certification	Certified units/sales
Australia (ARIA)	4× Platinum	60,000^{^}
^{^} Shipments figures based on certification alone.

== See also ==
- List of number-one hits of 2012 (Austria)
- List of number-one albums of 2012 (Ireland)
- List of UK R&B Chart number-one albums of 2012
- List of albums which have spent the most weeks on the UK Albums Chart
- New Zealand top 50 albums of 2012
