= Celia (song) =

Single by Annah Mac

from the album Little Stranger
- Released: June 10, 2011
- Recorded: 2011
- Genre: Pop
- Length: 2:50
- Label: Sony Music New Zealand
- Songwriter(s): Annah Mac

Annah Mac singles chronology
"Baby Don't Change" (2010)	"Celia" (2011)	"Girl In Stilettos" (2011)

"Celia" is the fourth single by New Zealand recording artist Annah Mac, from the album Little Stranger.

== Background ==
"Celia" was written and recorded by Annah Mac. She wrote the song after her friend, Celia, asked to write a song about her. The song is about "a best friend going astray, and trying to look after them." It was released as the fourth single from her album, Little Stranger.

== Music video ==
The music video premiered on Annah Mac's YouTube channel, on September 9, 2011. It was directed by Darren Simmons, from Wānaka. It shows Annah Mac singing with a band in the park, playing on the beach, and walking around in giant ribbons. Towards the end of the video, you can see members of the band jumping rope.

== Chart performance ==
On the New Zealand Artists Singles Chart, "Celia" debuted at number 16 on January 23, 2012. It eventually peaked at number 12 on January 30, 2012.

=== Charts ===
Chart (2012)	Peak position
New Zealand Artists Singles Chart	12

== Track listing ==
Digital download Celia - Single
No.	Title	Length
1.	"Celia"	2:48
