= Little Stranger (album) =

Studio album by Annah Mac
- Released: 5 September 2011
- Recorded: 2009–2011
- Genres: Pop, Rock, Country
- Length: 49:23
- Label: Sony Music Entertainment New Zealand

Singles from Little Stranger
- 1. "Home" Released: 23 April 2009; 2. "Focus" Released: 28 September 2009; 3. "Baby Don't Change" Released: 9 July 2010; 4. "Celia" Released: 10 June 2011; 5. "Girl In Stilettos" Released: 2011; 6. "Bucket" Released: 14 September 2012

Little Stranger is the debut studio (and only) album by New Zealand recording artist Annah Mac. It was released in New Zealand on 5 September 2011.

It peaked at #32 on the RIANZ Albums chart, and at #7 on the RIANZ New Zealand Artists Albums chart.

== Recording and production ==
The majority of the album was recorded at Roundhead Studios, with American producer Brady Blade; working with Josh Fountain to record and remix Girl In Stilettos at Woodcut Studios. Bucket was produced by Mac and Fountain at York Street Studios, while Celia was produced by Wayne Bell and Ben King at 'The Lab'.

== Singles ==
- Home was released as Annah Mac's debut single before the Little Stranger era; but is included on the album.
- Focus was released as Annah Mac's second single before the Little Stranger era; and is also included on the album.
- Baby Don't Change was released as Annah Mac's third single before the Little Stranger era; and is also included on the album.
- Celia was released as Annah Mac's fourth single, and is the first of the Little Stranger era. It is included on the album.
- Girl In Stilettos is Annah Mac's fifth single, and is the second of the Little Stranger era. It is Annah Mac's most popular single to date, and is included on the album. It peaked at #2 on the RIANZ singles chart, and at #1 on the RIANZ New Zealand Artists singles chart.
- Bucket was released as Annah Mac's sixth single, and is to be released as part of the deluxe edition of Little Stranger.

== Deluxe edition ==
In and interview with New Zealand radio station The Edge, Annah Mac said that she is looking at releasing a deluxe edition of the album Little Stranger in early 2013. It would contain the single Bucket, which was released on 14 September 2012, the deluxe edition was pulled for reasons unknown and remains unreleased.

== Track listing ==
No.	Title	Length
1.	"Celia"	2:50
2.	"Girl In Stilettos"	3:00
3.	"Same Cartoons"	4:09
4.	"Here I Stand"	4:35
5.	"Focus"	3:19
6.	"Baby Don't Change"	4:06
7.	"Make Me Yours"	3:07
8.	"City Lights"	4:07
9.	"Miss You"	4:06
10.	"Kiss Me"	3:41
11.	"Silver Friend"	5:18
12.	"Home"	3:08
13.	"Hey Ma (iTunes Bonus Track)"	3:57
Total length:		49:23

== The Girl In Stilettos Tour ==
The Girl In Stilettos Tour
- Tour by Annah Mac
- Associated album: Little Stranger
- Start date: 20 April 2012
- End date: 6 May 2012
- No. of shows: 5

The Girl In Stilettos Tour was the first concert tour by New Zealand musician Annah Mac, in support of her first studio album Little Stranger.

=== Dates and venues ===
Date	Location	Venue
20 April 2012	Auckland	Academy Cinemas
26 April 2012	Christchurch	CPSA Big Yellow Building
27 April 2012	Invercargill	Civic Theatre
28 April 2012	Dunedin	Sammy's
6 May 2012	Wellington	Downstage Theatre

== Charts ==
Charts (2012)	Peak position
New Zealand Albums Chart	19
New Zealand NZ Artists Albums Chart	7
