= Forever (Six60 song) =

Single by Six60

from the album Six60
- Released: 2 March 2012
- Recorded: 2010–2011
- Genre: Electronic rock, synthpop
- Length: 4:19
- Label: Massive Entertainment
- Songwriters: Marlon Gerbes, Matiu Walters

Six60 singles chronology
"Only to Be" (2011)	"Forever" (2012)	"In the Clear" (2012)

"Forever" is a single by New Zealand rock band Six60. It was released as on 2 March 2012 as the fourth single from their self-titled debut studio album. It reached number 13 on the New Zealand Singles Chart

== Track listing ==
Digital single

1. "Forever" – 5:13
2. "Forever" (Radio Edit) – 4:19

Digital EP

1. "Forever" (Movie Version) – 3:24
2. "Forever" – 3:55
3. "Forever" (Vandertone Alternative Mix) – 3:18
4. "Forever" (Peer Kusiv Remix) – 6:18
5. "Run for It" – 5:00

== Chart performance ==
"Forever" debuted on the RIANZ charts at number 31 and peaked at number 13.

Chart (2012)	Peak position
New Zealand (Recorded Music NZ)	13

== Certifications ==
Certifications for "Forever"
Region	Certification	Certified units/sales
New Zealand (RMNZ)	5× Platinum	150,000^{‡}
^{‡} Sales+streaming figures based on certification alone.

== Release history ==
Region	Date	Format	Label
New Zealand	2 March 2012	Digital download	Massive Entertainment
Germany	7 February 2014	Digital download	Four Music
