= Rise Up 2.0 =

Single by Six60

from the album Six60
- Released: 30 August 2010
- Recorded: 2010
- Genre: Drum and bass
- Length: 4:08
- Label: Massive/Universal
- Songwriter(s): Ji Fraser, Marlon Gerbes, Matiu Walters

Six60 singles chronology
"Rise Up 2.0" (2010)	"Don't Forget Your Roots" (2011)

"Rise Up 2.0" is a song by New Zealand pop rock band Six60. It was released as on 30 August 2010 as the lead single from their eponymous debut album, Six60 (2011). It reached number 1 on the New Zealand Singles Chart.

== Chart performance ==
"Rise Up 2.0" debuted on the RIANZ charts at number five and dropped out of the top 40 after three weeks. It later re-entered the charts at number 26 before peaking at number one.

== Music video ==
The music video for "Rise Up 2.0" was directed by Greg Page and set at an arm wrestling competition. While the competitors are challenging each other, Six60 perform the song behind a metal fence.

== Track listing ==
Digital single

1. "Rise Up 2.0" – 4:08

Digital EP

1. "Rise Up 2.0" – 4:08
2. "Rise Up 2.0" (Mount Eden Dubstep Remix) – 4:37
3. "Rise Up 2.0" (Tony B Remix) – 5:50

== Charts ==
Chart (2011)	Peak position
New Zealand (Recorded Music NZ)	1

== Certifications ==
Certifications for "Rise Up 2.0"
Region	Certification	Certified units/sales
New Zealand (RMNZ)	3× Platinum	90,000^{‡}
^{‡} Sales+streaming figures based on certification alone.
