= Annah Mac =

New Zealand producer, singer-songwriter and musician

Annah Mac is a New Zealand singer-songwriter, producer and musician. Her debut album, Little Stranger was released on the 5 September 2011, it was listed for seven weeks on the New Zealand Albums Top 40 Chart. The most successful single off the album was "Girl in Stilettos". The single was certified double platinum in New Zealand and was listed for 23 weeks on the New Zealand Top 40.

== Musical career ==
Mac moved to Auckland at the age of 17 and signed a deal with Sony Music New Zealand in November 2009.

In November 2011, Mac's single "Girl In Stilettos" was released and certified double platinum. The music video was funded by NZ On Air. In March 2012, Mac opened for One Direction on the NZ Leg of their world tour. In April 2012, Mac won an International Songwriting Award for original "Celia". She was nominated for a New Zealand Silver Scroll Award for "Girl In Stilettos" and also for two categories in the Vodafone New Zealand Music Awards, Breakthrough Artist and Best Single for "Girl In Stilettos". Mac performed at the awards ceremony. In September 2012, Mac performed the national anthem for the All Blacks at the All Blacks vs Springboks game in Dunedin. Towards the end of 2012, Mac released the final single from the album titled "Bucket". The single was to feature as part of a Deluxe Album release in early 2013 from Sony Music, but the edition was pulled.

In 2016 Mac began a collaboration with the Otago Corrections Facility, teaching prisoners in the Milton facility to play the ukulele and write songs. The collaboration led to Mac's production company Big House Records releasing a CD of 37 original songs, “The Kowhai Project”, in March 2021. Proceeds of the sale of the CD are donated to the Dunedin Night Shelter.

== Discography ==
=== Studio albums ===
Album title	Album details	Peak chart positions	
Album title	Album details	NZ Albums Chart	NZ Artists Albums Chart
Little Stranger	Released: 2011; Label: Sony Music New Zealand	19	7
Same Girl	Released: 2021 Label: Big House Records		

=== Singles ===
Year	Title	Peak chart positions		Album
Year	Title	NZ Singles Chart	NZ Artists Singles Chart	Album
2009	"Home"	-	-	Little Stranger
2009	"Focus"	-	-	Little Stranger
2010	"Baby Don't Change"	-	-	Little Stranger
2011/12	"Celia"	-	12	Little Stranger
2011/12	"Girl In Stilettos"	2	1	Little Stranger
2012	"Bucket"	-	15	non-album single
