= Girl in Stilettos =

"Girl In Stilettos"

Single by Annah Mac

from the album Little Stranger
- Released: 2011
- Recorded: 2011
- Genre: Synthpop
- Length: 3:00
- Label: Sony Music New Zealand
- Songwriter(s): Annah Mac

Annah Mac singles chronology
"'Celia'" (2011)	"Girl In Stilettos" (2011)	"'Bucket'" (2012)

Girl In Stilettos is a song by New Zealand recording artist Annah Mac.

== Background ==
Girl In Stilettos was written and recorded by Annah Mac, about her journey from Southland to Auckland, New Zealand. The song was released as the fifth single from her album Little Stranger. A remix of the song featuring Sidney Diamond was released on March 23, 2012.

== Music video ==
The music video was released on December 6, 2011. It was directed by Florence Noble, and shows her competing against veteran lawn bowlers at an old bowling club.

== Chart performance ==
- On the New Zealand Singles Chart, Girl In Stilettos debuted at #27 on December 12, 2011. It eventually peaked at #2 on January 23, 2012, where it stayed for three weeks.
- On the New Zealand Artists Singles Chart, Girl In Stilettos debuted at #10 on November 7, 2011. It eventually peaked at #1 on January 16, 2012, where it stayed for three weeks.

=== Charts ===
Chart (2011–12)	Peak position
New Zealand Singles Chart	2
New Zealand Artists Singles Chart	1

=== Year-end Charts ===
Chart (2011)	Position
New Zealand Artists Singles Chart	10
