= Only to Be =

"Only To Be"

Single by Six60

from the album Six60
- Released: 28 November 2011
- Recorded: 2010
- Genre: Pop rock, alternative rock
- Length: 4:41
- Label: Massive Entertainment
- Songwriters: Ji Fraser, Matiu Walters

Six60 singles chronology
"Don't Forget Your Roots" (2011)	"Only To Be" (2011)	"Forever" (2012)

"Only To Be" is a song by New Zealand pop rock band Six60. It was released on 28 November 2011 as the third single from the band's eponymous debut album, Six60 (2011). It reached number 5 on the New Zealand Singles Chart.

== Track listing ==
Digital single

1. "Only to Be" - 4:41

== Chart performance ==
"Only to Be" debuted on the RIANZ charts at number 36 and peaked at number five.

Chart (2011–12)	Peak position
New Zealand (Recorded Music NZ)	5

== Certifications ==
Certifications for "Only to Be"
Region	Certification	Certified units/sales
New Zealand (RMNZ)	8× Platinum	240,000^{‡}
^{‡} Sales+streaming figures based on certification alone.

== Release history ==
Region	Date	Format	Label
New Zealand	28 November 2011	Digital Download	Massive Entertainment
