= Don't Forget Your Roots (song) =

Single by Six60

from the album Six60
- Released: 18 July 2011
- Recorded: 2010
- Genre: Pop rock, reggae fusion
- Length: 3:53
- Label: Massive/Universal
- Songwriters: Ji Fraser, Matiu Walters

Six60 singles chronology
| "Rise Up 2.0" (2011) | "Don't Forget Your Roots" (2011) | "Only to Be" (2011) |

"Don't Forget Your Roots" is a single by New Zealand rock band Six60. It was released as on 18 July 2011 as the second single from their self-titled debut studio album. It reached number 2 on the New Zealand Singles Chart.

In September 2019, Six60 re-recorded the song for Waiata / Anthems, a collection of re-recorded New Zealand pop songs to promote te Wiki o te Reo Māori (Māori Language Week). The new version, retitled "Kia Mau Ki Tō Ūkaipō / Don't Forget Your Roots", featured lyrics reinterpreted by scholar Tīmoti Kāretu as is featured on the album, Waiata / Anthems.

== Music video ==
A music video to accompany the release of "Don't Forget Your Roots" was first released onto YouTube on 13 July 2011 at a total length of three minutes and forty-eight seconds. it was written as a remix version of "Dont Forget Your Roots"

== Track listing ==
Digital single

1. "Don't Forget Your Roots" – 3:53
2. "Don't Forget Your Roots" (Crushington Remix) – 3:41
3. "Don't Forget Your Roots" (Damn Moroda remix) – 3:58

== Chart performance ==
"Don't Forget Your Roots" debuted on the RIANZ charts at number 10 and has peaked to number 2.

=== Charts ===
| Chart (2011) | Peak position |
|---|---|
| New Zealand (Recorded Music NZ) | 2 |
| New Zealand NZ Singles (RIANZ) | 1 |

=== Year-end charts ===
| Chart (2011) | Peak position |
|---|---|
| New Zealand NZ Singles (RIANZ) | 10 |

== Certifications ==
Certifications for "Don't Forget Your Roots"
| Region | Certification | Certified units/sales |
|---|---|---|
| New Zealand (RMNZ) | 12× Platinum | 360,000^{‡} |
| New Zealand (RMNZ) for Kia Mau Ki Tō Ūkaipō / Don't Forget Your Roots | 4× Platinum | 120,000^{‡} |
^{‡} Sales+streaming figures based on certification alone.

== Release history ==
| Region | Date | Format | Label |
|---|---|---|---|
| New Zealand | 18 July 2011 | Digital Download | Massive Entertainment |
