= Six60 (2011 album) =

Studio album by Six60
- Released: 10 October 2011
- Recorded: 2010–2011
- Label: Massive
- Producer: Six60 & Tiki Taane

Six60 chronology
Six60 (2011)	Six60 (2015)

Singles from Six60
- 1. "Rise Up 2.0" Released: 30 August 2010; 2. "Don't Forget Your Roots" Released: 18 July 2011; 3. "Only to Be" Released: 28 November 2011; 4. "Forever" Released: 2 March 2012; 5. "In the Clear" Released: 27 July 2012; 6. "Finest Wine" Released: 28 February 2013

Six60 is the self-titled debut studio album by New Zealand rock band Six60. Released on 10 October 2011, it debuted at No. 1 on the New Zealand albums chart and was certified Gold in its first week. The album includes the songs "Rise Up 2.0" and "Don't Forget Your Roots".

== Singles ==
- "Rise Up 2.0" was released as the album's lead single on 30 August 2010. It peaked at number 1 on the New Zealand singles chart.
- "Don't Forget Your Roots" is the second single from the album. It was released on 18 July 2011. It peaked at number 2 on the New Zealand singles chart.
- "Only to Be" is the third single from the album. It peaked at number 5 on the New Zealand singles chart.
- "Forever" is the fourth single from the album. It peaked at number 13 on the New Zealand singles chart (as of 27 March 2012).
- "In the Clear" was released as the fifth single, remixed by dance producer Paul Mac for its single release. It peaked at number 12 on the New Zealand singles chart.
- "Finest Wine" was released as the album's sixth single early in 2013. It failed to reach the New Zealand singles chart, but enjoyed success on the local chart.

== Track listing ==
Six60 track listing
No.	Title	Length
1.	"Only to Be"	4:41
2.	"Forever"	5:13
3.	"Beside You"	4:41
4.	"Windy Days"	4:30
5.	"Run for It"	4:57
6.	"Hard for Me"	5:25
7.	"Get"	4:16
8.	"Lost"	7:58
9.	"Rest of You"	4:58
10.	"In the Clear"	5:56
11.	"Green Bottles"	3:56
12.	"Don't Forget Your Roots"	3:52
13.	"Finest Wine"	3:40
14.	"Money"	1:57
15.	"Take It from Here"	5:52
16.	"Rise Up 2.0"	4:08

== Charts ==
=== Weekly charts ===
Weekly chart performance for Six60
Chart (2011)	Peak position
New Zealand Albums Chart	1

=== Year-end charts ===
Year-end chart performance for Six60
Chart	Year	Position
New Zealand Albums (RMNZ)	2011	6
New Zealand Albums (RMNZ)	2019	18
New Zealand Albums (RMNZ)	2020	13
New Zealand Albums (RMNZ)	2021	9
New Zealand Albums (RMNZ)	2022	7
New Zealand Albums (RMNZ)	2023	15

== Certifications ==
Certifications for Six60
Region	Certification	Certified units/sales
New Zealand (RMNZ)	13× Platinum	195,000^{‡}
^{‡} Sales+streaming figures based on certification alone.

== Release history ==
Release history and formats for Six60
Region	Date	Format
New Zealand	10 October 2011	CD; digital download

== See also ==
- List of best-selling albums in New Zealand
