= Kiesza discography =

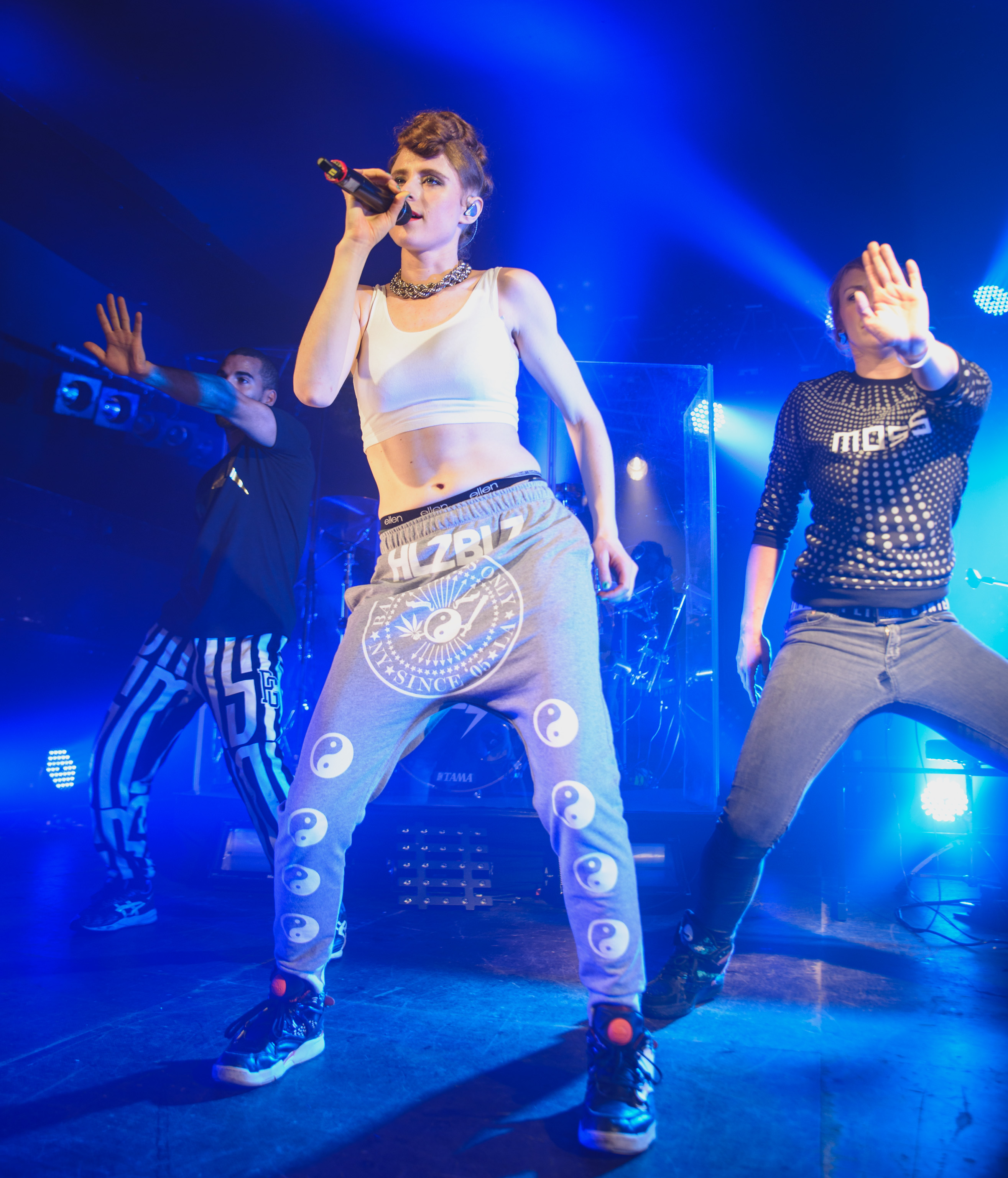
- Kiesza performing at the Sound of a Woman Tour, 2015
- Studio albums: 3
- EPs: 4
- Singles: 41
- Music videos: 7

Canadian singer and songwriter Kiesza has released three studio albums, four extended plays, forty-one singles (including nine as a featured artist), and seven music videos.

== Studio albums ==
List of studio albums, with selected chart positions, sales figures and certifications
| Title | Album details | Peak chart positions | | | | | | |
| Title | Album details | CAN | AUT | GER | NLD | SWI | UK | US |
|---|---|---|---|---|---|---|---|---|
| Kiesza | Released: 2008; Label: Independent | — | — | — | — | — | — | — |
| Sound of a Woman | Released: October 17, 2014; Label: Lokal Legend, Island; Formats: CD, digital download | 14 | 18 | 10 | 66 | 14 | 40 | 42 |
| Crave | Released: August 14, 2020; Label: Zebra Spirit Tribe; Formats: CD, digital download | — | — | — | — | — | — (Note: Crave did not enter the UK Official Albums Chart, but peaked at number 81 on the UK Album Downloads Chart.) | — |
"—" denotes a recording that did not chart or was not released.

== Extended plays ==
| Title | Details |
|---|---|
| Hideaway | Released: July 7, 2014; Label: Lokal Legend, Island; Format: Digital download, streaming |
| Weird Kid (with Chris Malinchak) | Released: October 12, 2018; Label: Independent; Format: Digital download, streaming |
| Dark Tales | Released: December 18, 2020; Label: Zebra Spirit Tribe; Format: Digital download, streaming |
| Tommy | Released: March 22, 2022; Label: Zebra Spirit Tribe; Format: Digital download, streaming |
| Dancing and Crying: Vol. 1 | Released: May 24, 2024; Label: Zebra Spirit Tribe; Formats: Digital download, streaming |
| Dancing and Crying: Vol. 2 | Released: July 25, 2025; Label: Zebra Spirit Tribe; Formats: Digital download, streaming |
| Dancing and Crying: Volume 3 | Released: May 8, 2026; Label: Zebra Spirit Tribe; Formats: Digital download, streaming |

== Singles ==
=== As lead artist ===
| Title | Year | Peak chart positions | | | | | | | | | | Certifications | Album |
| Title | Year | CAN | AUS | BEL | DEN | GER | IRE | NLD | SWI | UK | US | Certifications | Album |
|---|---|---|---|---|---|---|---|---|---|---|---|---|---|
| "Hideaway" | 2014 | 5 | 25 | 1 | 2 | 5 | 11 | 1 | 5 | 1 | 51 | MC: Platinum; ARIA: Gold; BEA: Gold; BPI: Platinum; BVMI: Platinum; IFPI DEN: Platinum; IFPI SWI: Gold; RIAA: Gold | Hideaway and Sound of a Woman |
| "Giant in My Heart" | 2014 | 52 | — | 12 | — | 11 | 72 | 48 | 48 | 4 | — | | Hideaway and Sound of a Woman |
| "Bad Thing" | 2014 | — | — | — | — | — | — | — | — | — | — | | Sound of a Woman |
| "No Enemiesz" | 2014 | — | — | 66 | — | — | — | — | — | 30 | — | | Sound of a Woman |
| "Sound of a Woman" | 2015 | — | — | 78 | — | — | — | — | — | — | — | | Sound of a Woman |
| "Cut Me Loose" (SeeB Remix) | 2015 | — | — | — | — | — | — | — | — | — | — | | Sound of a Woman |
| "Give It to the Moment" (featuring Djemba Djemba) | 2015 | — | — | — | — | — | — | — | — | — | — | | Non-album singles |
| "Dearly Beloved" | 2017 | — | — | — | — | — | — | — | — | — | — | | Non-album singles |
| "Mother" (vs. Chris Malinchak) | 2018 | — | — | — | — | — | — | — | — | — | — | | Non-album singles |
| "Phantom of the Dance Floor" (featuring Philippe Sly) | 2018 | — | — | — | — | — | — | — | — | — | — | | Dark Tales EP |
| "Weird Kid" (with Chris Malinchak) | 2018 | — | — | — | — | — | — | — | — | — | — | | Weird Kid EP |
| "3 Hos" (with Chris Malinchak as Malinkiesza) | 2018 | — | — | — | — | — | — | — | — | — | — | | Non-album single |
| "Sweet Love" | 2019 | — | — | — | — | — | — | — | — | — | — | | Crave |
| "Naked (With My Headphones On)" (with Rat City) | 2019 | — | — | — | — | — | — | — | — | — | — | | Non-album single |
| "You're the Best" | 2019 | — | — | — | — | — | — | — | — | — | — | | Crave |
| "When Boys Cry" | 2020 | — | — | — | — | — | — | — | — | — | — | | Crave |
| "I Think That I Like You" (with Tom Ferry) | 2020 | — | — | — | — | — | — | — | — | — | — | | Non-album single |
| "All of the Feelings" | 2020 | — | — | — | — | — | — | — | — | — | — | | Crave |
| "Crave" | 2020 | — | — | — | — | — | — | — | — | — | — | | Crave |
| "Storm" | 2020 | — | — | — | — | — | — | — | — | — | — | | Non-album single |
| "Love Me with Your Lie" | 2020 | — | — | — | — | — | — | — | — | — | — | | Crave |
| "Sensuum Defectui" | 2020 | — | — | — | — | — | — | — | — | — | — | | Dark Tales EP |
| "Bridged by a Lightwave" (with deadmau5) | 2020 | — | — | — | — | — | — | — | — | — | — | | Non-album single |
| "Eleanor Rigby" | 2020 | — | — | — | — | — | — | — | — | — | — | | Dark Tales EP |
| "Fly with the Angels" (with Supafly) | 2021 | — | — | — | — | — | — | — | — | — | — | | Non-album singles |
| "Tectonic" (with Tommy Trash) | 2021 | — | — | — | — | — | — | — | — | — | — | | Non-album singles |
| "Out of My League" (with Brando) | 2021 | — | — | — | — | — | — | — | — | — | — | | Non-album singles |
| "Passenger" | 2022 | — | — | — | — | — | — | — | — | — | — | | Tommy |
| "Bitch I Care" | 2022 | — | — | — | — | — | — | — | — | — | — | | Tommy |
| "Slow Motion Fighting" | 2022 | — | — | — | — | — | — | — | — | — | — | | Tommy |
| "Running Up That Hill (A Deal with God)" | 2022 | — | — | — | — | — | — | — | — | — | — | | Non-album singles |
| "One More Time" (with Nytrix) | 2022 | — | — | — | — | — | — | — | — | — | — | | Non-album singles |
| "Tree" (with Chris Malinchak) | 2023 | — | — | — | — | — | — | — | — | — | — | | Non-album singles |
| "Egyptian Sun" (with Francis Mercier) | 2023 | — | — | — | — | — | — | — | — | — | — | | Non-album singles |
| "Christmas Without You" (with Sugar Jesus) | 2023 | — | — | — | — | — | — | — | — | — | — | | Non-album singles |
| "Heaven Ain't Calling" (with Sugar Jesus) | 2024 | — | — | — | — | — | — | — | — | — | — | | Dancing and Crying: Vol. 1 |
| "Dancing and Crying" | 2024 | — | — | — | — | — | — | — | — | — | — | | Dancing and Crying: Vol. 1 |
| "I Go Dance" | 2024 | — | — | — | — | — | — | — | — | — | — | | Dancing and Crying: Vol. 1 |
| "The Mysterious Disappearance of Etta Place" | 2024 | — | — | — | — | — | — | — | — | — | — | | Dancing and Crying: Vol. 1 |
| "Strangers" | 2024 | — | — | — | — | — | — | — | — | — | — | | Dancing and Crying: Vol. 1 |
| "Heaven After Dark" (with Haviah Mighty & Sugar Jesus) | 2024 | — | — | — | — | — | — | — | — | — | — | | Non-album single |
| "Stays in Bed" | 2025 | — | — | — | — | — | — | — | — | — | — | | Dancing and Crying: Vol. 2 |
| "So Erotic" (with Peaches) | 2025 | — | — | — | — | — | — | — | — | — | — | | Dancing and Crying: Vol. 2 |
| "I Can't Wait" (with Bob Sinclar) | 2026 | — | — | — | — | — | — | — | — | — | — | | Non-album single |
| "Good Morning America" (with Kylie) | 2026 | — | — | — | — | — | — | — | — | — | — | | Dancing and Crying: Vol. 3 |
| "When I'm Dancing" | 2026 | — | — | — | — | — | — | — | — | — | — | | Dancing and Crying: Vol. 3 |
"—" denotes a recording that did not chart or was not released.

=== As featured artist ===
| Title | Year | Peak chart positions | | | | Certifications | Album |
| Title | Year | BE | FIN | NL | UK | Certifications | Album |
|---|---|---|---|---|---|---|---|
| "Triggerfinger" (Donkeyboy featuring Kiesza) | 2013 | — | 9 | — | — | | non-album single |
| "Take Ü There" (Jack Ü featuring Kiesza) | 2014 | 134 | — | — | 63 | RIAA: Gold | Skrillex and Diplo Present Jack Ü |
| "Teach Me" (Joey Bada$$ featuring Kiesza) | 2015 | 79 | — | — | — | | B4.Da.$$ |
| "Last Night in the City" (Duran Duran featuring Kiesza) | 2015 | — | — | — | — | | Paper Gods |
| "Don't Want You Back" (Bakermat featuring Kiesza) | 2017 | 86 | — | 46 | — | | non-album single |
| "Hello Shadow" (Skygge featuring Kiesza) | 2017 | — | — | — | — | | Hello World |
| "All for You" (Rynx featuring Kiesza) | 2019 | — | — | — | — | | In Pieces |
| "What You're Made Of" (Lindsey Stirling featuring Kiesza) | 2020 | — | — | — | — | | "Azur Lane" Original Video Game Soundtrack |
| "Carousel" (Slushii featuring Kiesza) | 2022 | — | — | — | — | | E.L.E (Extinction Level Event) |
| "Electric Heaven" (Bonnie McKee featuring Kiesza) | 2025 | — | — | — | — | | Hot City |
"—" denotes a recording that did not chart or was not released.

== Guest appearances ==
List of non-single appearances, showing year released, with other performing artists, and album name
| Title | Year | Artist | Album |
|---|---|---|---|
| "Nobody to Love", "Doo Wop (That Thing)" | 2014 | —N/a | BBC Radio 1's Live Lounge 2014 |
| "Cannonball" | 2015 | —N/a | Home |
| "Stronger" | 2015 | —N/a | Finding Neverland: The Album |
| "Pain Told Love" | 2015 | Tribe Society | Lucid Dreams |
| "Last Night in the City" | 2015 | Duran Duran | Paper Gods |
| "We Are Strong" | 2017 | Pitbull | Climate Change |
| "I Could Be Yours" | 2024 | Lucky Love | I Don't Care if It Burns |

== Writer credits ==
List of writer and production work for other artists, with other performing artists and producers, showing year released and album name
| Title | Year | Performing artist(s) | Album |
|---|---|---|---|
| "Go All Night" | 2014 | Gorgon City | Sirens |
| "Don't Care" | 2014 | Sandra Lyng | Don't Care |
| "Feel the Light" | 2015 | Jennifer Lopez | Home |
| "I'm In It With You" | 2015 | Loreen | Non-album single |

== Music videos ==
| Year | Title | Director(s) | Album |
|---|---|---|---|
| 2014 | "Hideaway" | Rami Samir Afuni, Ljuba Castot, Kiesza | Sound of a Woman |
| 2014 | "Giant in My Heart" | Rami Samir Afuni | Sound of a Woman |
| 2014 | "What Is Love" | Rami Samir Afuni | Sound of a Woman |
| 2014 | "No Enemiesz" | Syndrome | Sound of a Woman |
| 2015 | "Sound of a Woman" | Jessie Hill, Blayre Ellestad, Ljuba Castot | Sound of a Woman |
| 2015 | "Stronger" | | Finding Neverland |
| 2017 | "Dearly Beloved" | Supple Nam, Blayre Ellestad | —N/a |
| 2018 | "Phantom of the Dance Floor" | Kiesza, Ljuba Castot | —N/a |
| 2020 | "Love Me With Your Lie" | 10th Dimension Studios | Crave |
| 2020 | "All Of The Feelings" | —N/a | Crave |
| 2024 | "Heaven Ain't Calling" | D. Gregor Hagey | Dancing and Crying: Vol. 1 |
| 2024 | "Dancing and Crying" | D. Gregor Hagey | Dancing and Crying: Vol. 1 |
| 2024 | "I Go Dance" | D. Gregor Hagey | Dancing and Crying: Vol. 1 |
| 2024 | "The Mysterious Disappearance of Etta Place" | D. Gregor Hagey | Dancing and Crying: Vol. 1 |
| 2024 | "Strangers" | D. Gregor Hagey | Dancing and Crying: Vol. 1 |
