= List of UK Independent Singles Chart number ones of 2014 =

These are the Official Charts Company's UK Indie Chart number-one singles of 2014.

== Chart history ==
Key
†	Best-selling indie single of the year

Issue date	Single	Artist(s)	Record label	Sales	Ref.
4 January	"Look Right Through"	Storm Queen	Ministry of Sound		
11 January	"Look Right Through"	Storm Queen	Ministry of Sound		
18 January	"Sail"	Awolnation	Red Bull		
25 January	"Riptide" †	Vance Joy	Liberation Music		
1 February	"Riptide" †	Vance Joy	Liberation Music		
8 February	"Riptide" †	Vance Joy	Liberation Music		
15 February	"Dibby Dibby Sound"	DJ Fresh vs. Jay Fay featuring Ms. Dynamite	Ministry Of Sound		
22 February	"Dibby Dibby Sound"	DJ Fresh vs. Jay Fay featuring Ms. Dynamite	Ministry Of Sound		
1 March	"Dibby Dibby Sound"	DJ Fresh vs. Jay Fay featuring Ms. Dynamite	Ministry Of Sound		
8 March	"Dibby Dibby Sound"	DJ Fresh vs. Jay Fay featuring Ms. Dynamite	Ministry Of Sound		
15 March	"Dibby Dibby Sound"	DJ Fresh vs. Jay Fay featuring Ms. Dynamite	Ministry Of Sound		
22 March ^{[a]}	"Tsunami (Jump)"	DVBBS & Borgeous featuring Tinie Tempah	Ministry Of Sound	80.000	
29 March	"Tsunami (Jump)"	DVBBS & Borgeous featuring Tinie Tempah	Ministry Of Sound		
5 April	"Tsunami (Jump)"	DVBBS & Borgeous featuring Tinie Tempah	Ministry Of Sound		
12 April	"Tsunami (Jump)"	DVBBS & Borgeous featuring Tinie Tempah	Ministry Of Sound		
19 April	"Tsunami (Jump)"	DVBBS & Borgeous featuring Tinie Tempah	Ministry Of Sound		
26 April	"Tsunami (Jump)"	DVBBS & Borgeous featuring Tinie Tempah	Ministry Of Sound		
3 May	"Tsunami (Jump)"	DVBBS & Borgeous featuring Tinie Tempah	Ministry Of Sound		
10 May	"Tsunami (Jump)"	DVBBS & Borgeous featuring Tinie Tempah	Ministry Of Sound		
17 May	"Tsunami (Jump)"	DVBBS & Borgeous featuring Tinie Tempah	Ministry Of Sound		
24 May	"Rise Like a Phoenix"	Conchita Wurst	ORF-Enterprise		
31 May	"Riptide" †	Vance Joy	Liberation Music		
7 June ^{[a]}	"I Wanna Feel"	SecondCity	Ministry Of Sound	82,050	
14 June	"I Wanna Feel"	SecondCity	Ministry Of Sound		
21 June	"Noble England"	Rik Mayall	Motivation		
28 June	"I Wanna Feel"	SecondCity	Ministry Of Sound		
5 July	"I Wanna Feel"	SecondCity	Ministry Of Sound		
12 July	"Make U Bounce"	DJ Fresh vs. TC featuring Little Nikki	Ministry Of Sound		
19 July	"Make U Bounce"	DJ Fresh vs. TC featuring Little Nikki	Ministry Of Sound		
26 July	"Stolen Dance"	Milky Chance	Ignition		
2 August	"Always" (Route 94 Radio Edit)	MK featuring Alana	Defected		
9 August	"Always" (Route 94 Radio Edit)	MK featuring Alana	Defected		
16 August	"Stolen Dance"	Milky Chance	Ignition Records		
23 August	"Riptide" †	Vance Joy	Liberation Music		
30 August	"Riptide" †	Vance Joy	Liberation Music		
6 September	"Rari WorkOut"	Lethal Bizzle featuring JME & Tempa T	New State Music		
13 September	"Pushing On"	Oliver Dollar & Jimi Jules	Ministry Of Sound		
20 September	"Pushing On"	Oliver Dollar & Jimi Jules	Ministry Of Sound		
27 September	"Riptide" †	Vance Joy	Liberation Music		
4 October	"All About That Bass"	Power Music	Power Music		
11 October	"Flashlight"	DJ Fresh featuring Ellie Goulding	Ministry Of Sound		
18 October	"Every Other Freckle"	Alt-J	Infectious		
25 October	"Stolen Dance"	Milky Chance	Ignition		
1 November	"UKIP Calypso"	Independents	Angel Air		
8 November	"Medicine"	The 1975	Dirty Hit		
15 November	"No Man's Land (Green Fields Of France)"	Joss Stone featuring Jeff Beck	Stone'd Records		
22 November	"No Man's Land (Green Fields Of France)"	Joss Stone featuring Jeff Beck	Stone'd Records		
29 November	"6 Words"	Wretch 32	Ministry Of Sound		
6 December	"6 Words"	Wretch 32	Ministry Of Sound		
13 December	"6 Words"	Wretch 32	Ministry Of Sound		
20 December	"6 Words"	Wretch 32	Ministry Of Sound		
27 December	"Got No Fans"	Wealdstone Raider	Wealdstone Records		

== Notes ==
- ^{a} – The single was simultaneously number-one on the singles chart.

Week 33 #1 and #2 was very close the MK song "Always" charted at #41 on the top 100 chart and the Milky Chance song "Stolen Dance" charted at #42 but Milky Chance topped this indie chart. Week 39 was the last time Vance Joy was allowed a place on the chart, meaning Alt-J, The 1975 and Joss Stone reached number one by default.

== Number-one Indie artists ==
Position	Artist	Weeks at number one
1	DVBBS	9
1	Borgeous	9
2	DJ Fresh	8
3	Vance Joy	7
4	Secondcity	4
4	Wretch 32	4
5	Milky Chance	3
6	Joss Stone	2
6	Marc Kinchen	2
6	Oliver Dollar	2
6	Storm Queen	2
6	TC	2
7	The 1975	1
7	Alt-J	1
7	Awolnation	1
7	Conchita Wurst	1
7	Independents	1
7	JME	1
7	Lethal Bizzle	1
7	Power Music	1
7	Rik Mayall	1
7	Wealdstone Raider	1

== See also ==
- List of UK Dance Chart number-one singles of 2014
- List of UK R&B Chart number-one singles of 2014
- List of UK Rock Chart number-one singles of 2014
- List of UK Indie Chart number-one albums of 2014
