= Delta Heavy =

British electronic music duo

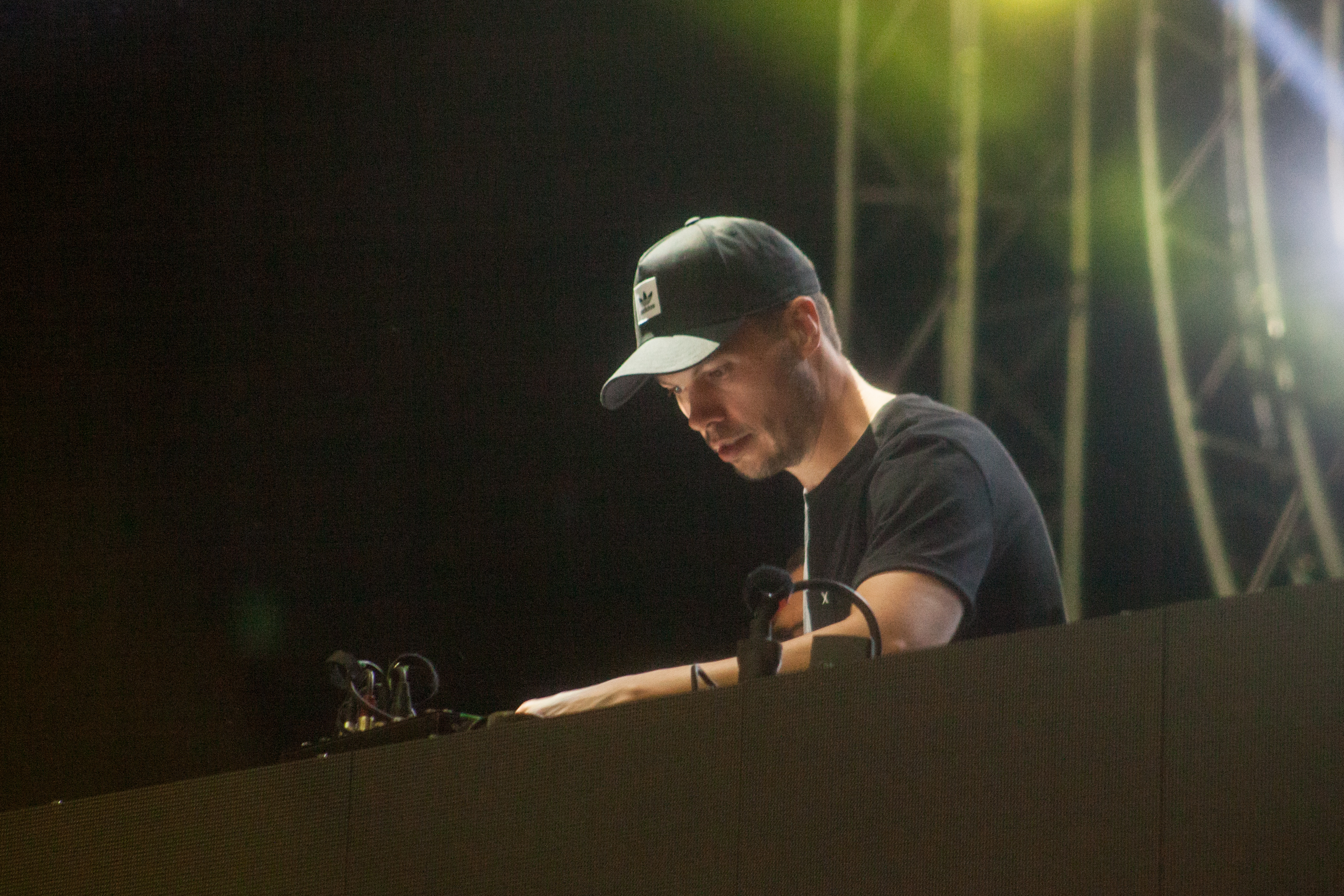
- Simon James from Delta Heavy performing at electronic music festival Beats for Love in 2019 (Ostrava, Czechia)

Background information
- Origin: London, England, UK
- Genres: Drum and bass; dubstep; drumstep; moombahcore
- Years active: 2009–present
- Labels: RAM Records; Monstercat; UKF
- Members: Ben Hall; Simon James
- Website: www.deltaheavy.co.uk

Delta Heavy (often stylised as DELTΔ HEΔVY) are an English drum and bass production duo consisting of Ben Hall and Simon James. They found fame with their 2012 single "Get By", which entered the UK Indie Chart at number 30. The duo's debut album, Paradise Lost, was released on 18 March 2016 through RAM Records.

== Career history ==
=== 2010–2014: Early beginnings and commercial breakthrough ===
Delta Heavy first signed to Viper Recordings in 2009, and provided the songs "Galaxy" and "Abort" for two of the label's compilations. They were picked up by the prestigious drum and bass label RAM Records in 2010, and released their first two singles, "Space Time" and "Overkill" with them. Their debut extended play, Down the Rabbit Hole, was released in May 2012. It entered the UK Dance Chart at number 37.

=== 2014–present: Paradise Lost and Only in Dreams ===
On 2 November 2014, the group released the first single from their debut album, "Reborn". This was followed by "Ghost", released 17 July 2015. The song gained popularity due to its music video, which features an animated Clippit. The album's third single, "Punish My Love", features vocals from British singer Tanika, and was released 4 December 2015. The album's title and release date were announced on 14 January 2016; Paradise Lost was released on 18 March 2016. On 22 January, "City of Dreams" was released as an instant grat single for those who pre-ordered the album on iTunes. The album's fourth official single, "Oscillator", was released on 4 March, backed with "Fun House". "White Flag VIP", a variation in production of album track "White Flag", was released on 26 May 2016, backed with "Arcadia".

In March 2019, Delta Heavy released their sophomore album, Only in Dreams, which includes collaborations with artists such as Zeds Dead, Modestep, Muzzy, and Kuuro.

== Discography ==
=== Studio albums ===
Title	Album details	Peak chart positions	
Title	Album details	UK Dance	UK Indie Breakers
Paradise Lost	Released: 18 March 2016; Label: RAM; Format: Digital download, CD vinyl	15	13
Only in Dreams	Released: 22 March 2019; Label: RAM; Format: Digital download	20	—
Midnight Forever	Released: 23 August 2024; Label: Delta Heavy; Format: Digital download	3	—
"—" denotes items which were not released in that country or failed to chart.

=== EPs ===
Year	Extended play	Label
2012	Down the Rabbit Hole	RAM Records
2014	Apollo	RAM Records
2023	No Gravity	Delta Heavy

=== Singles ===
Year	Single	Peak chart positions				Album
Year	Single	UK Dance	UK Indie	UK Indie Breakers	NZ Hot	Album
2010	"Space Time" / "Take the Stairs"	—	—	—	—	Non-album singles
2011	"Overkill" / "Hold Me"	—	—	—	—	Non-album singles
2012	"Get By"	37	30	10	2	Down the Rabbit Hole EP
2013	"Empire"	—	—	—	—	Non-album single
2014	"Reborn"	—	—	—	—	Paradise Lost
2015	"Ghost" / "Tremors"	—	—	—	—	Paradise Lost
2015	"Punish My Love"	—	—	—	—	Paradise Lost
2016	"Oscillator" / "Fun House"	—	—	—	—	Paradise Lost
2016	"White Flag"	—	—	—	—	Paradise Lost
2016	"Kill Room" / "Bar Fight"	—	—	—	—	Non-album singles
2017	"Kaleidoscope"	—	—	—	—	Non-album singles
2017	"Gargantua"	—	—	—	—	Non-album singles
2017	"Stay" (with Dirty Audio featuring HOLLY)	—	—	—	—	Non-album singles
2017	"Nobody But You" (featuring Jem Cooke)	—	—	—	—	Non-album singles
2018	"I Need You"	—	—	—	—	Non-album singles
2018	"Gravity"	—	—	—	—	Non-album singles
2018	"Exodus"	—	—	—	—	Only in Dreams
2018	"Anarchy" (with Everyone You Know)	—	—	—	—	Only in Dreams
2019	"Lift You Up" (with Zeds Dead)	—	—	—	—	Only in Dreams
2019	"Take Me Home" (featuring Jem Cooke)	—	—	—	—	Only in Dreams
2019	"Here with Me" (featuring Modestep)	—	—	—	—	Only in Dreams
2020	"Higher Ground" (with Muzz featuring Cammie Robinson)	—	—	—	—	Non-album singles
2020	"Tormenta" (with Kayzo)	—	—	—	—	Non-album singles
2021	"Feel" (with Koven)	—	—	—	33	Non-album singles
2021	"Work It"	—	—	—	—	Non-album singles
2022	"Heartbeat" (featuring DJ Rae)	—	—	—	—	Non-album singles
2022	"Hydra"	—	—	—	—	No Gravity EP
2022	"Ascend"	—	—	—	—	No Gravity EP
2023	"Get Down Tonight" (with Hayley May)	—	—	—	21	Midnight Forever
2024	"Ecstasy"	—	—	—	29	Midnight Forever
2024	"Punching Holes"	—	—	—	24	Midnight Forever
2024	"Bad Decisions" (with Cameron Warren)	—	—	—	36	Midnight Forever
2026	"Set You Free"	—	—	—	18	Non-album single

=== Promotional singles ===
Year	Track	Release
2016	"City of Dreams"	Paradise Lost
2016	"Paradise Lost"	Paradise Lost

=== Other appearances ===
Year	Track	Release	Label
2009	"Galaxy"	Acts of Mad Men	Viper Recordings
2010	"Abort"	The Headroom EP: Parts 3 & 4	Viper Recordings
2011	"Minus"	RAM 100	RAM Records
2015	"Apathy"	RAMsterdam Drum & Bass 2015	RAM Records

=== Remixes ===
Year	Song	Artist
2011	"Street Dancer"	Avicii
2011	"Stay Awake"	Example
2011	"Hitz"	Chase & Status featuring Tinie Tempah
2011	"Quad Bikes"	Mensah, Sukh Knight and Squarewave
2012	"Must Be the Feeling"	Nero
2012	"Flesh and Bone"	Emalkay featuring Rod Azlan
2012	"When the Rain Is Gone"	Adam F
2012	"Iron Deer Dream"	Fixers
2012	"Get By" (174 Mix)	Delta Heavy
2012	"I Used to Have It All"	Maverick Sabre
2012	"RIP"	Rita Ora featuring Tinie Tempah
2012	"I Love London"	Crystal Fighters
2012	"Crowd Control"	Excision and Downlink
2013	"Here to Stay"	Zomboy featuring Lady Chann
2013	"Earthquake"	DJ Fresh vs. Diplo featuring Dominique Young Unique
2014	"Pushing On"	Oliver $ & Jimi Jules
2015	"Turbine VIP"	Delta Heavy
2015	"Silverlined"	XYconstant
2015	"Deep Down Low"	Valentino Khan
2015	"+1"	Martin Solveig featuring Sam White
2015	"Punish My Love" (174 Mix)	Delta Heavy
2016	"How Love Begins" (Delta Heavy's 2003 Remix)	DJ Fresh and High Contrast featuring Dizzee Rascal
2016	"Us"	Kaskade & CID
2016	"White Flag" (VIP Mix)	Delta Heavy
2016	"Punish My Love" (VIP Mix)	Delta Heavy
2017	"S.T.A.Y." (Delta Heavy Tribute)	Hans Zimmer
2017	"Lights Out"	Zeds Dead featuring Atlas
2020	"Show Me the Light" (VIP Mix)	Delta Heavy featuring Starling
2020	"What's Done is Done"	Seven Lions featuring HALIENE

== Accolades and awards ==
Year	Organization	Recipient(s)	Category	Result
2019	International Dance Music Awards	Delta Heavy	Best Male Artist (Drum and Bass)	Won
