= List of UK Independent Albums Chart number ones of 2014 =

These are the Official Charts Company's UK Independent Albums Chart number-one albums of 2014.

== Chart history ==
Key
†	Best-selling indie album of the year

Issue date	Album	Artist(s)	Record label	Ref.
5 January	AM	Arctic Monkeys	Domino	
12 January	AM	Arctic Monkeys	Domino	
19 January	If You Wait †	London Grammar	Ministry of Sound	
26 January	Wanderlust	Sophie Ellis-Bextor	EBGB's	
2 February	Cavalier Youth	You Me at Six	Virgin	
9 February	If You Wait †	London Grammar	Ministry of Sound	
16 February	If You Wait †	London Grammar	Ministry of Sound	
23 February	AM	Arctic Monkeys	Domino	
2 March	AM	Arctic Monkeys	Domino	
9 March	AM	Arctic Monkeys	Domino	
16 March	AM	Arctic Monkeys	Domino	
23 March	Going to Hell	The Pretty Reckless	Cooking Vinyl	
30 March	If You Wait †	London Grammar	Ministry of Sound	
7 April	If You Wait †	London Grammar	Ministry of Sound	
14 April	If You Wait †	London Grammar	Ministry of Sound	
21 April	If You Wait †	London Grammar	Ministry of Sound	
28 April	The Cautionary Tales of Mark Oliver Everett	Eels	Vagrant	
5 May	Embrace	Embrace	Cooking Vinyl	
12 May	Luminous	The Horrors	XL	
19 May	Nabuma Rubberband	Little Dragon	Because	
26 May	AM	Arctic Monkeys	Domino	
2 June	AM	Arctic Monkeys	Domino	
9 June	Hank	Hank Marvin	DMGTV	
16 June	Lazaretto	Jack White	XL	
23 June	Lazaretto	Jack White	XL	
30 June	Lazaretto	Jack White	XL	
7 July	Mutineers	David Gray	Good Soldier Songs	
14 July	If You Wait †	London Grammar	Ministry of Sound	
21 July	Jungle	Jungle	XLfHank	
28 July	If You Wait †	London Grammar	Ministry of Sound	
4 August	If You Wait †	London Grammar	Ministry of Sound	
11 August	Long Road Home	Charlie Simpson	Pias	
18 August	LP1	FKA twigs	Young Turks	
25 August	Concrete Love	Courteeners	Polydor	
1 September	Hounds of Love	kate Bush	Fish People	
8 September	The Day's War	Lonely the Brave	Hassle	
15 September	El Pintor	Interpol	Matador	
22 September	Jungle	Jungle	XL	
29 September	This Is All Yours	Alt-J	Infectious Records	
6 October	This Is All Yours	Alt-J	Infectious Records	
13 October	Our Love	Caribou	Merge	
20 October	This Is All Yours	Alt-J	Infectious Records	
27 October	Phantom Radio	Mark Lanegan	Vagrant	
3 November	Dead	Young Fathers	Anticon	
10 November	If You Wait †	London Grammar	Ministry of Sound	
17 November	Bloodstone & Diamonds	Machine Head	Nuclear Blast	
24 November	Avonmore	Bryan Ferry	Chrysalis Group	
1 December	Stand by Me – Live in Concert	Daniel O'Donnell	Rosette Records	
8 December	Stand by Me – Live in Concert	Daniel O'Donnell	Rosette Records	
15 December	Stand by Me – Live in Concert	Daniel O'Donnell	Rosette Records	
22 December	Stand by Me – Live in Concert	Daniel O'Donnell	Rosette Records	
29 December	AM	Arctic Monkeys	Domino	

== See also ==
- List of UK Dance Albums Chart number ones of 2014
- List of UK Album Downloads Chart number ones of the 2010s
- List of UK Independent Singles Chart number ones of 2014
- List of UK R&B Albums Chart number ones of 2014
- List of UK Independent Singles Chart number ones of 2014
