= List of UK Dance Singles Chart number ones of 2014 =

The UK Dance Singles Chart is a record chart compiled by the Official Charts Company (OCC) on behalf of the British record industry. It displays the highest-selling singles in the dance music genre of any given week. This is a list of the songs which were number one on the UK Dance Singles Chart during 2014. The dates listed in the menus below represent the Saturday after the Sunday the chart was announced, as per the way the dates are given in chart publications such as the ones produced by Billboard, Guinness, and Virgin.

== Number-one singles ==
Key
| † | Best-selling dance single of the year |

| Issue date (week ending) | Single | Artist(s) | Sales | Chart reference |
|---|---|---|---|---|
| 4 January | "Hey Brother" | Avicii | | |
| 11 January | "Hey Brother" | Avicii | | |
| 18 January | "Hey Brother" | Avicii | | |
| 25 January | "Hey Brother" | Avicii | | |
| 1 February ^{[a]} | "Rather Be"† | Clean Bandit featuring Jess Glynne | 162,801 | |
| 8 February ^{[a]} | "Rather Be"† | Clean Bandit featuring Jess Glynne | 136,952 | |
| 15 February ^{[a]} | "Rather Be"† | Clean Bandit featuring Jess Glynne | 102,542 | |
| 22 February ^{[a]} | "Rather Be"† | Clean Bandit featuring Jess Glynne | 79,050 | |
| 1 March | "Rather Be"† | Clean Bandit featuring Jess Glynne | | |
| 8 March | "Rather Be"† | Clean Bandit featuring Jess Glynne | | |
| 15 March ^{[a]} | "My Love" | Route 94 featuring Jess Glynne | 120,770 | |
| 22 March ^{[a]} | "Tsunami (Jump)" | DVBBS & Borgeous featuring Tinie Tempah | 80,476 | |
| 29 March ^{[a]} | "I Got U" | Duke Dumont featuring Jax Jones | 112,082 | |
| 5 April | "I Got U" | Duke Dumont featuring Jax Jones | 60,000 | |
| 12 April | "I Got U" | Duke Dumont featuring Jax Jones | 48,000 | |
| 19 April ^{[a]} | "Nobody to Love" | Sigma | 121,176 | |
| 26 April ^{[a]} | "Hideaway" | Kiesza | 136,286 | |
| 3 May ^{[a]} | "Waves (Robin Schulz remix)" | Mr Probz & Robin Schulz | 126,702 | |
| 10 May ^{[a]} | "Summer" | Calvin Harris | 100,168 | |
| 17 May ^{[a]} | "Waves (Robin Schulz remix))" | Mr Probz & Robin Schulz | 75,537 | |
| 24 May | "Waves (Robin Schulz remix))" | Mr Probz & Robin Schulz | | |
| 31 May | "Waves (Robin Schulz remix))" | Mr Probz & Robin Schulz | | |
| 7 June ^{[a]} | "I Wanna Feel" | Secondcity | 82,050 | |
| 14 June | "I Wanna Feel" | Secondcity | | |
| 21 June | "Wasted" | Tiësto featuring Matthew Koma | | |
| 28 June | "Wasted" | Tiësto featuring Matthew Koma | | |
| 5 July ^{[a]} | "Gecko (Overdrive)" | Oliver Heldens & Becky Hill | 76,517 | |
| 12 July | "Gecko (Overdrive)" | Oliver Heldens & Becky Hill | | |
| 19 July | "Right Here" | Jess Glynne | | |
| 26 July | "Right Here" | Jess Glynne | | |
| 2 August | "Right Here" | Jess Glynne | | |
| 9 August | "Faded" | Zhu | | |
| 16 August | "Faded" | Zhu | | |
| 23 August | "Giant in My Heart" | Kiesza | | |
| 30 August ^{[a]} | "Lovers on the Sun" | David Guetta featuring Sam Martin | 71,165 | |
| 6 September ^{[a]} | "Prayer in C" | Lilly Wood & Robin Schulz | 85,169 | |
| 13 September ^{[a]} | "Prayer in C" | Lilly Wood & Robin Schulz | 68,958 | |
| 20 September ^{[a]} | "Blame" | Calvin Harris featuring John Newman | 70,312 | |
| 27 September ^{[a]} | "Changing" | Sigma featuring Paloma Faith | 104,191 | |
| 4 October | "Changing" | Sigma featuring Paloma Faith | | |
| 11 October | "Changing" | Sigma featuring Paloma Faith | | |
| 18 October | "Blame" | Calvin Harris featuring John Newman | | |
| 25 October | "Changing" | Sigma featuring Paloma Faith | | |
| 1 November | "Bump & Grind 2014" | Waze & Odyssey vs. R. Kelly | | |
| 8 November | "Wicked Games" | Parra for Cuva featuring Anna Naklab | | |
| 15 November | "Outside" | Calvin Harris featuring Ellie Goulding | | |
| 22 November | "Outside" | Calvin Harris featuring Ellie Goulding | | |
| 29 November | "Real Love" | Clean Bandit & Jess Glynne | | |
| 6 December | "Real Love" | Clean Bandit & Jess Glynne | | |
| 13 December | "Real Love" | Clean Bandit & Jess Glynne | | |
| 20 December | "Last All Night (Koala)" | Oliver Heldens featuring KStewart | | |
| 27 December | "Outside" | Calvin Harris featuring Ellie Goulding | | |

- ^{a} – the single was simultaneously number-one on the singles chart.

== Number-one Dance artists ==
| Position | Artist | Weeks at number one |
|---|---|---|
| 1 | Clean Bandit | 9 |
| 2 | Calvin Harris | 6 |
| 2 | Robin Schulz (As a remixer) | 6 |
| 3 | Sigma | 5 |
| 4 | Avicii | 4 |
| 5 | Mr Probz | 4 |
| 5 | Duke Dumont | 3 |
| 5 | Jess Glynne | 3 |
| 5 | Oliver Heldens | 3 |
| 6 | Kiesza | 2 |
| 6 | Lilly Wood & the Prick | 2 |
| 6 | Secondcity | 2 |
| 6 | Tiësto | 2 |
| 6 | Zhu | 2 |
| 6 | David Guetta | 1 |
| 7 | DVBBS | 1 |
| 7 | Borgeous | 1 |
| 7 | Parra for Cuva | 1 |
| 7 | Route 94 | 1 |
| 7 | Waze & Odyssey | 1 |

== See also ==
- List of UK Singles Chart number ones of 2014
- List of UK Dance Albums Chart number ones of 2014
- List of UK Independent Singles Chart number ones of 2014
- List of UK R&B Singles Chart number ones of 2014
- List of UK Rock & Metal Singles Chart number ones of 2014
