= All of the Feelings =

Single by Kiesza

from the album Crave
- Released: March 6, 2020
- Studio: Wondersound Studios West; Studio 365; Sideways Studios
- Genre: funk-pop; synth-pop
- Length: 3:38
- Label: Zebra Spirit Tribe
- Songwriters: Kiesa Rae Ellestad; Adam Agati; Emery Taylor
- Producer: Emery Taylor

Kiesza singles chronology
"I Think That I Like You" (2020)	"All of the Feelings" (2020)	"Crave" (2020)

"All of the Feelings" is a pop song recorded by Canadian musician Kiesza from her second studio album, Crave (2020).

== Charts ==
Chart (2020)	Peak position
Canada AC (Billboard)	48
Canada CHR/Top 40 (Billboard)	31
Canada Hot AC (Billboard)	50
