= List of UK Dance Albums Chart number ones of 2014 =

These are the Official Charts Company's UK Dance Chart number-one albums of 2014. The dates listed in the menus below represent the Saturday after the Sunday the chart was announced, as per the way the dates are given in chart publications such as the ones produced by Billboard, Guinness, and Virgin.

== Chart history ==
Issue date	Album	Artist(s)	Record label	Ref.
4 January	True	Avicii	PRMD, Island	
11 January	Home	Rudimental	Asylum	
18 January	Radio 1 Dance Anthems with Danny Howard	Various Artists	BBC	
25 January	Radio 1 Dance Anthems with Danny Howard	Various Artists	BBC	
1 February	True	Avicii	PRMD, Island	
8 February	True	Avicii	PRMD, Island	
15 February	True	Avicii	PRMD, Island	
22 February	Eat Sleep Rave Repeat	Various Artists	Ministry of Sound	
1 March	Settle	Disclosure	PMR, Island	
8 March	Eat Sleep Rave Repeat	Various Artists	Ministry of Sound	
15 March	True	Avicii	Island	
22 March	Last Night a DJ Saved My Life	Various Artists	Ministry of Sound	
29 March	Recess	Skrillex	Asylum	
5 April	Eat Sleep Rave Repeat	Various Artists	Ministry of Sound	
12 April	Anthems 90s 2	Various Artists	Ministry of Sound	
19 April	Soulful House	Various Artists	Sony Music	
26 April	Ultimate Club Anthems	Various Artists	Universal Music TV	
3 May	Ultimate Club Anthems	Various Artists	Universal Music TV	
10 May	Euphoric Clubland 2	Various Artists	Universal Music TV	
17 May	This Is House	Various Artists	Universal Music TV	
24 May	This Is House	Various Artists	Universal Music TV	
31 May	Laidback Beats	Various Artists	Sony Music	
7 June	Laidback Beats	Various Artists	Sony Music	
14 June	New Eyes	Clean Bandit	Atlantic	
21 June	Marbella Sessions 2014	Various Artists	Ministry of Sound	
28 June	While(1 Is Less Than 2)	Deadmau5	Mau5trap	
5 July	Marbella Sessions 2014	Various Artists	Ministry of Sound	
12 July	Holiday Anthems	Various Artists	Sony Music	
19 July	Live Life Living	Example	Epic	
26 July	Clubland 25	Various Artists	Universal Music TV	
2 August	Rhythum of the Night	Various Artists	Warner Music TV	
9 August	The House That Garage Built	Various Artists	Ministry of Sound	
16 August	BBC Radio 1's Dance Anthems Ibiza	Various Artists	BBC	
23 August	Ibiza: The Album	Various Artists	Sony Music TV Comp	
30 August	Ibiza: The Album	Various Artists	Sony Music TV Comp	
6 September	Ibiza: The Album	Various Artists	Sony Music TV Comp	
13 September	Ibiza: The Album	Various Artists	Sony Music TV Comp	
20 September	Now That's What I Call Club Hits	Various Artists	Sony Music TV Comp	
27 September	Now That's What I Call Club Hits	Various Artists	Sony Music TV Comp	
4 October	Syro	Aphex Twin	Warp	
11 October	Wonder Where We Land	SBTRKT	Young Turks	
18 October	Sirens	Gorgon City	Virgin EMI Records	
25 October	The Only Way Is Essex Dance Anthems	Various Artists	Universal Music TV	
1 November	Annie Mac Presents 2014	Various Artists	Virgin EMI	
8 November	Annie Mac Presents 2014	Various Artists	Virgin EMI	
15 November	Motion	Calvin Harris	Deconstruction	
22 November	Motion	Calvin Harris	Deconstruction	
29 November	Motion	Calvin Harris	Deconstruction	
6 December	Listen	David Guetta	What a Music, Parlophone	
13 December	Complete Clubland	Various Artists	Universal Music TV	
20 December	Clubbing 2015	Various Artists	Sony Music TV Comp	
27 December	Motion	Calvin Harris	Deconstruction	

== See also ==
- List of UK Albums Chart number ones of the 2010s
- List of UK Dance Singles Chart number ones of 2014
- List of UK Album Downloads Chart number ones of the 2010s
- List of UK Independent Singles Chart number ones of 2014
- List of UK R&B Albums Chart number ones of 2014
- List of UK Independent Singles Chart number ones of 2014
- List of UK Compilation Chart number ones of the 2010s
