= Only in Dreams (Delta Heavy album) =

Studio album by Delta Heavy
- Released: 22 March 2019
- Genre: Drum and bass
- Label: RAM Records
- Producer: Ben Hall; Simon James

Delta Heavy chronology
Paradise Lost (2016)	Only in Dreams (2019)

Singles from Only in Dreams
- 1. "Exodus" Released: 12 July 2018; 2. "Anarchy" Released: 23 November 2018; 3. "Lift You Up" Released: 18 January 2019; 4. "Take Me Home" Released: 15 February 2019; 5. "Here With Me" Released: 12 April 2019

Only in Dreams is the second studio album by English drum and bass production duo Delta Heavy. Drum and bass record label RAM Records released the album on 22 March 2019.

== Background ==
Only in Dreams was announced in January 2019. To promote the album, the duo released "Take Me Home" featuring English singer Jem Cooke in February. In an interview with Dancing Astronaut, the duo cited the song as one of their favourites from the album, reasoning that it allowed them to represent the variety in their sound.

To further promote the album, Delta Heavy announced a world tour, which began on 1 February and concluded on 15 June.

In an interview with EDMIdentity, Simon Hall described that despite the lack of a concrete concept for the album, he and Ben James came up with the title independently and that it was relatable.

== Reception ==
Only in Dreams was met with positive reviews. BroadwayWorld praised the album on release, calling it a "work of maturity and bristling confidence."

== Track list ==
No.	Title	Length
1.	"In Dreams" (Intro)	1:36
2.	"Anarchy" (with Everyone You Know)	3:38
3.	"Lift You Up" (with Zeds Dead)	4:22
4.	"Here With Me" (featuring Modestep)	3:34
5.	"Exodus"	4:43
6.	"Revenge" (with Muzzy)	4:38
7.	"A.I."	3:56
8.	"Collide" (featuring Rae Hall)	5:08
9.	"Replicant" (with Kuuro)	3:54
10.	"Show Me the Light" (featuring Starling)	4:04
11.	"Take Me Home" (featuring Jem Cooke)	3:52

== Charts ==
Chart (2019)	Peak position
UK Dance Albums (OCC)	20
