= No Enemiesz =

Single by Kiesza

from the album Sound of a Woman
- Released: November 23, 2014
- Genre: Deep house; Eurodance
- Length: 3:18
- Label: Lokal Legend
- Songwriters: Kiesa Rae Ellestad; Rami Samir Afuni
- Producer: Rami Samir Afuni

Kiesza singles chronology
| "Take Ü There" (2014) | "No Enemiesz" (2014) | "Sound of a Woman" (2015) |

"No Enemiesz" is a song by Canadian recording artist Kiesza from her debut studio album, Sound of a Woman (2014). Lokal Legend Records released the song as the third single from the album in the United Kingdom on November 10, 2014. Kiesza co-wrote "No Enemiesz" with the track's producer Rami Samir Afuni. A deep house and Eurodance song, "No Enemiesz" consists of a prominent retro house beat, bleary bass and a bouncy, grinding groove.

Upon its release, "No Enemiesz" was acclaimed by music critics, who praised the track's euphoric chorus and '90s-inspired production. Some went on to deem the single as Kiesza's best to-date and compared it to Robyn and Kleerup's "With Every Heartbeat" (2007). Kiesza has performed the song at gigs in the United Kingdom, the United States and Germany, in which she incorporated a dance routine reminiscent of Madonna's "Vogue" (1990).

== Background ==
"No Enemiesz" was written by Kiesza and Rami Samir Afuni, and produced by the latter. On September 12, 2014 Kiesza posted a snippet of the song on her Facebook page, the full version of the song then leaked online hours before its premiere on Annie Mac's BBC Radio 1 show that evening. Prior to its premiere, Kiesza performed "No Enemiesz" live on several occasions since June 4, 2014, where it became recognized as a "fan favorite". The track was uploaded to Kiesza's Vevo page on September 17, 2014. It was released on November 17, 2014 as the third single from Kiesza's debut album, Sound of a Woman (2014).

== Composition ==
"No Enemiesz" is a deep house and Eurodance song, which runs for a duration of three minutes and 18 seconds. It consists of a prominent retro house beat, bleary bass and a bouncy, grinding groove. The song features the chorus "If we could all fall in love together / We'd have no enemies" which is convicted with a sense of euphoria while disintegrating into a beat-heavy frenzy. "No Enemiesz" was described by Fuse journalist Hillary Hughes as a "dance anthem that embraces Kiesza's trademark '90s house vibes". Musically, "No Enemiesz" has been likened to the most successful dance songs of the early-to-mid-1990s, in addition to Robyn and Kleerup's "With Every Heartbeat" (2007).

== Critical reception ==
Upon its release, "No Enemiesz" garnered critical acclaim from music critics. Idolator's Robbie Daw deemed it "utterly fantastic", while Digital Spy's Lewis Corner and Amy Davidson wrote, "The extra consonant might be puzzling but there's nothing confusing about 'No Enemiesz' continuation of Kiesza's trademark blend of house and pop". Hillary Hughes of Fuse felt the track served as an indication that Sound of a Woman would be "one of the biggest records of the season" and opined, "With 'No Enemiesz,' the life and party-loving mantras we got a taste of with 'Hideaway' are back and more positive than ever." Fuse went on to rank "No Enemiesz" second in their list, The 13 Best New Dance Songs We Heard This Month. Music website Popjustice awarded the song a nine (out of ten)-star rating and deemed it Kiesza best single to-date, and wrote, "It trundles along quite splendidly for the first 48 seconds but that euphoric 'if we could all fall in love together' chorus is total perfection." Revolt's Hannah Rad opined, "['No Enemiesz' is] another immediate heater from Kiesza and with each output, she makes us fall a little harder." Ava Tunnicliffe of Nylon positively reviewed the track, writing, "The combination of '90s house vibes, cool synth beats, and catchy lyrics make this a track that we're going to be singing along to for a while". In conclusion, Tunnicliffe added, "With so many hits under her belt already, we can only imagine that the album will blow our minds."

== Music video ==
The official music video for "No Enemiesz" was released on October 24, 2014. In it, Kiesza dances around and eventually strips down to a bikini.

== Live performances ==
Kiesza first performed "No Enemiesz" at XOYO in London on June 4, 2014. In a review of the gig, Andre Paine of the London Evening Standard stated that Kiesza performed the song in a dance routine with muscular male dancers, in a sequence reminiscent of Madonna's "Vogue" (1990). The track was then reprised during Kiesza's date at the Santos Party House in New York City on July 23, 2014. Idolator reviewer Robbie Daw echoed Paine's comparison to "Vogue", opining, "In case anyone doubted her love of the '90s, the night got started with Kiesza and her two female dancers voguing (!) their way through energetic fan favorite 'No Enemiesz'".

== Track listings and formats ==
- Digital download
1. No Enemiesz - 3:16
- Digital EP
1. "No Enemiesz (My Nu Leng Remix)" - 4:09
2. "No Enemiesz (Stefan Ponce Remix)" - 3:16
3. "No Enemiesz (Jauz Remix)" - 3:38
4. "No Enemiesz (Syn Cole Remix)" - 3:20

== Charts ==
Chart performance for "No Enemiesz"
| Chart (2014) | Peak position |
|---|---|
| Belgium Dance (Ultratop Flanders) | 30 |
| Belgium (Ultratip Bubbling Under Flanders) | 37 |
| Belgium Dance (Ultratop Wallonia) | 26 |
| Belgium (Ultratip Bubbling Under Wallonia) | 16 |
| CIS Airplay (TopHit) | 32 |
| Russia Airplay (TopHit) | 32 |
| Scotland Singles (OCC) | 21 |
| Ukraine Airplay (TopHit) | 151 |
| UK Dance (OCC) | 7 |
| UK Singles (OCC) | 30 |
| US Dance Club Songs (Billboard) | 44 |

== Release history ==
| Country | Date | Format | Label |
|---|---|---|---|
| United Kingdom | November 23, 2014 | Digital download | Lokal Legend |
