= Paradise Lost (Delta Heavy album) =

Studio album by Delta Heavy
- Released: 18 March 2016
- Recorded: 2014–16
- Genre: Drum and bass
- Length: 52:00
- Label: RAM Records
- Producer: Delta Heavy

Delta Heavy chronology
Apollo EP (2014)	Paradise Lost (2016)	Only in Dreams (2019)

Singles from Paradise Lost
- 1. "Reborn" Released: 16 October 2014; 2. "Ghost/Tremors" Released: 5 August 2015; 3. "Punish My Love" Released: 27 December 2015; 4. "Oscillator/Fun House" Released: 15 February 2016; 5. "White Flag" Released: 18 March 2016

Paradise Lost is the debut studio album that was written and produced by British drum and bass DJ duo Delta Heavy. It was originally scheduled to be released on 4 March 2016, but was pushed back to 18 March 2016. It was released through RAM Records and features the hit singles, "Ghost" and "Punish My Love".

== Track listing ==
Note: All tracks produced by Delta Heavy. All tracks written by Delta Heavy, except where noted:

No.	Title	Writer(s)	Length
1.	"Paradise Lost"		4:46
2.	"Event Horizon"		4:30
3.	"City of Dreams"	Hall; James; Barnaby Atherton	4:34
4.	"White Flag"	Hall; James; Robert Etheridge	3:03
5.	"Punish My Love"	Hall; James; Tanika Bailey	4:09
6.	"Limbo"		1:03
7.	"Pathways"		4:10
8.	"Tremors"		3:08
9.	"Conquer The Galaxy"		4:40
10.	"Oscillator"		4:17
11.	"Ascending"		2:12
12.	"Reborn"	Hall; James; Hannah Yadi	3:27
13.	"Cut Me"		4:11
14.	"Ghost"	Hall; James; Valentina Pappalardo; David Sugar	4:15
Total length:			52:00
