= Crave (Kiesza album) =

Studio album by Kiesza
- Released: August 14, 2020
- Length: 32:48
- Label: Zebra Spirit Tribe
- Producers: Lick Drop; Chris Malinchak; NamahFalcon; Peter Wade; Emery Taylor; Electric; Louis Biancaniello; Michael Biancaniello; Bobby Love; Kid Harpoon

Kiesza chronology
Weird Kid (2019)	Crave (2020)

Singles from Crave
- 1. "When Boys Cry" Released: January 10, 2020; 2. "All of the Feelings" Released: March 6, 2020; 3. "Crave" Released: April 10, 2020; 4. "Love Me with Your Lie" Released: June 12, 2020

Professional ratings
Aggregate scores
Source	Rating
Metacritic	77/100
Review scores
Source	Rating
NME	4/5 stars
Pitchfork	7.0/10

Crave is the third studio album by Canadian singer-songwriter Kiesza. It was released through her own label Zebra Spirit Tribe on August 14, 2020, and serves as the follow-up to her debut album, Sound of a Woman, released in 2014. The album was called a "1980s-inspired upbeat dance album" by CBC.ca.

== Track listing ==
Crave – track listing
No.	Title	Writer(s)	Producer(s)	Length
1.	"Run Renegade"	Kiesa Rae Ellestad; Amanda Lucille Warner; Peter Wade Keusch	Peter Wade	4:05
2.	"All of the Feelings"	Ellestad; Adam Agati; Emery Taylor	Taylor	3:37
3.	"Crave"	Ellestad; Paul Phamous; Edvard Erfjord; Henrik Michelsen	Electric	3:36
4.	"Can't Be Saved"	Ellestad; Louis Biancaniello; Michael Biancaniello	L. Biancaniello; M. Biancaniello	3:33
5.	"Love Me with Your Lie"	Ellestad; Robert Wauchope	Bobby Love	2:50
6.	"When Boys Cry"	Ellestad; Chris Malinchak	Malinchak	2:53
7.	"Sky Ain't the Limit"	Ellestad; Daniel Foreman; Jacob Cunningham	Lick Drop	3:15
8.	"Love Never Dies"	Ellestad; Malinchak	Malinchak	5:03
9.	"Dance with Your Best Friend" (featuring LICK DROP, Cocanina and Shan Vincent de Paul)	Ellestad; Foreman; Cunningham; Cocoa M. D. Bell; Shan Vincent de Paul	Lick Drop	3:56
Total length:				32:48

Crave – Physical bonus tracks
No.	Title	Writer(s)	Producer(s)	Length
10.	"Sweet Love"	Ellestad; Philippe Sly; Kasper Falkenberg; Nicholas Furdal; Thomas Hull	NamahFalcon; Kid Harpoon	3:24
11.	"You're the Best"	Ellestad; Falkenberg; Furdal	NamahFalcon	2:40
Total length:				38:52

Crave – Deluxe edition reissue
No.	Title	Writer(s)	Producer(s)	Length
10.	"Dying for You"	Ellestad; Taylor Sparks	Sparks	2:59
11.	"When the Stars Don't Shine"	Ellestad; Sparks	Sparks	2:45
Total length:				38:36

== Charts ==
Chart (2020)	Peak position
UK Album Downloads (OCC)	81

== Release history ==
Release dates and formats for Crave
Region	Date	Format	Version	Label	Ref.
Various	August 14, 2020	Digital download; LP; streaming	Standard	Zebra Spirit Tribe	
Various	August 14, 2020	CD	Bonus track edition	Zebra Spirit Tribe	
Various	July 30, 2021	Digital download; streaming	Deluxe edition	Zebra Spirit Tribe	
