= Sound of a Woman =

Studio album by Kiesza
- Released: October 13, 2014
- Genres: House; dance-pop; EDM; R&B
- Length: 50:21
- Labels: Lokal Legend; Island; 4th & B'way
- Producers: Rami Samir Afuni (also exec.); Jordan Orvosh; Simen & Espen

Kiesza chronology
Hideaway (2014)	Sound of a Woman (2014)	Weird Kid (2019)

Singles from Sound of a Woman
- 1. "Hideaway" Released: April 11, 2014; 2. "Giant in My Heart" Released: June 16, 2014; 3. "Bad Thing" Released: September 22, 2014; 4. "No Enemiesz" Released: November 23, 2014; 5. "Sound of a Woman" Released: May 12, 2015; 6. "Cut Me Loose" Released: August 21, 2014

Sound of a Woman is the major label debut studio album by Canadian singer Kiesza. It is her second album after her 2008 self-titled independent release and her first full-length international debut. It was released on October 13, 2014.

== Background ==
In February 2014, Kiesza released the video for her new single "Hideaway" through the indie label Lokal Legend. Idolator considered it unique, for having a single take through the entire video, as Kiesza walked and danced through the streets of Brooklyn. John Gentile of Rolling Stone called the style "impressive". Kiesza reported to Rolling Stone that she had trouble making the video, partly because she broke a rib just before filming, and "couldn't move for an entire month afterward." It was premiered by Annie Mac on her Mac's Special Delivery segment on BBC Radio 1. "Hideaway" debuted at number one on the UK Singles Chart issued for April 26, 2014.

Shortly after "Hideaway" charted, Kiesza released a new video for her cover of Haddaway's song "What Is Love". Mike Bell of the Calgary Herald referred to her version of the song as a "jaw-droppingly gorgeous cover of Haddaway's 1993 dance smash What Is Love?" She did a slowed down version, with a video showing her and others, slowly revealed to be without clothes, to express "raw emotions".

Kiesza described Sound of a Woman as having grunge, rock, and folk influences in addition to her usual house or dance genre and that some songs on the album would be surprising to people.

== Singles ==
"Hideaway" was released as Kiesza's debut single on April 11, 2014. Both the song and its accompanying music video have been met with general acclaim from contemporary music critics. "Hideaway" topped the UK Singles Chart upon release, selling over 136,000 copies in its first week, becoming the third-fastest selling single of 2014 in the United Kingdom.

"Giant in My Heart" was released as the album's second single on June 13, 2014, and reached number 4 on the UK Singles Chart, while "Bad Thing" featuring American rapper Joey Badass was released as the album's third single on September 22, 2014. "No Enemiesz" was released as the album's fourth single on November 23, 2014. Its music video was released a month earlier on October 24, 2014.

"Sound of a Woman" was released as the album's fifth single on May 24, 2015. The SeeB remix of "Cut Me Loose" was released as the album's sixth and final single on August 21, 2014.

== Critical reception ==
Professional ratings
Aggregate scores
Source	Rating
AnyDecentMusic?	6.3/10
Metacritic	63/100
Review scores
Source	Rating
AllMusic	3.5/5 stars
Clash	7/10
Edmonton Journal	3/5 stars
Exclaim!	7/10
The Guardian	3/5 stars
Idolator	4/5
The New York Times	positive
NOW Magazine	3/5 stars
The Observer	2/5 stars
Pitchfork	5.2/10
Slant Magazine	3.5/5 stars
Spin	positive

Sound of a Woman received generally positive reviews from music critics. At Metacritic, which assigns a normalised rating out of 100 to reviews from mainstream critics, the album received an average score of 63 based on twelve reviews, which indicates "generally favorable reviews". Brennan Carley of Spin called it "one of the most elastic albums of the 1990s, both 20 years too late and also totally in time" and noted that Kiesza "shows the insight to carve a lane out for herself in pop music that apparently nobody else felt the need to journey down." Melody Lau of Exclaim! felt that the album makes "an important statement" in the dance music scene and hailed Kiesza's voice as "exceptionally strong and versatile." Jon Caramanica of The New York Times wrote that "while [Kiesza] doesn't quite have the freedom in her voice to mimic fully the divas she's aiming for, she sings powerfully and with an understanding of how to deliver notes with rhythmic aggression."

Bianca Gracie of Idolator described the album as "the perfect soundtrack that feeds your '90s nostalgia." Heather Phares of AllMusic wrote that "while Sound of a Woman is slightly too long and unfocused, at its best it's a potent reminder of how much fun this sound was -- and is." Julia Leconte of NOW Magazine noticed that "at first, [...] Kiesza's debut album seems overwrought [...] but eventually, subtleties and variety emerge" and felt that "Kiesza's so much better when she reels back her impressively ranging vocals to buttery." Larry Fitzmaurice of Pitchfork noted that Sound of a Woman "fails to spark, as its homogenous textures blend together to rob this music of the personality and emotion it has when done right" and felt that the songs on the album "don't give any clues as to who Kiesza is." Elliot Greiner of Mxdwn asserted that "lyrically [Sound of a Woman] is dry, musically it leeches off of the inventiveness of its predecessors, and in total it sounds like the extended soundtrack to a Samsung advert." Sandra Sperounes of the Edmonton Journal concluded that "it's too early to tell if Kiesza will end up on the same heap of former pop-culture phenoms, but her album's brief forays into R&B [...] hint at a much more promising and multi-dimensional future for the 25-year-old redhead."

== Track listing ==
Sound of a Woman – Standard edition
No.	Title	Writer(s)	Producer(s)	Length
1.	"Hideaway"	Kiesa Rae Ellestad; Rami Samir Afuni	Afuni	4:11
2.	"No Enemiesz"	Ellestad; Afuni	Afuni	3:17
3.	"Losin' My Mind" (featuring Mick Jenkins)	Ellestad; Afuni; Jayson Jenkins	Afuni	3:51
4.	"So Deep"	Ellestad; Afuni	Afuni	4:28
5.	"Vietnam"	Ellestad; Afuni; Paolo "Shirazi" Prudencio	Afuni	3:50
6.	"Bad Thing" (featuring Joey Badass)	Ellestad; Afuni; Carlos St John; Jo-Vaughn Scott; Corey "Latif" Williams	Afuni	3:31
7.	"What Is Love"	Dieter Lünstedt; Karin Hartmann-Eisenblätter	Afuni	3:08
8.	"Sound of a Woman"	Ellestad; Afuni	Afuni	3:46
9.	"The Love"	Ellestad; Afuni; Prudencio; St. John	Afuni	3:57
10.	"Piano"	Ellestad; Afuni; St. John	Afuni	4:28
11.	"Giant in My Heart"	Ellestad; Afuni	Afuni	4:29
12.	"Over Myself"	Ellestad; Simen Eriksrud; Espen Berg	Simen & Espen	3:32
13.	"Cut Me Loose"	Ellestad; Jordan Orvosh	Orvosh	3:53
Total length:				50:21

Sound of a Woman – iTunes edition bonus track
No.	Title	Writer(s)	Length
14.	"Hideaway" (acoustic version)	Ellestad; Afuni	3:14
Total length:			53:35

Sound of a Woman – UK deluxe edition bonus tracks
No.	Title	Writer(s)	Length
14.	"Hideaway" (acoustic version)	Ellestad; Afuni	3:16
15.	"Take Me to Church" (Hozier cover)	Andrew Hozier-Byrne	4:43
16.	"Prayer in C" (Lilly Wood and the Prick cover) (BBC live version)	Benjamin Cotto; Nili Hadida	3:55
17.	"Take Ü There" (Jack Ü featuring Kiesza)	Ellestad; Sonny Moore; Thomas Wesley Pentz	3:30
18.	"Hideaway" (video)		4:36
19.	"Giant in My Heart" (video)		4:37
Total length:			73:36

== Charts ==
Chart performance for Sound of a Woman
Chart (2014)	Peak position
Austrian Albums (Ö3 Austria)	18
Belgian Albums (Ultratop Flanders)	19
Belgian Albums (Ultratop Wallonia)	33
Canadian Albums (Billboard)	14
Dutch Albums (Album Top 100)	66
French Albums (SNEP)	160
German Albums (Offizielle Top 100)	10
Italian Albums (FIMI)	28
Scottish Albums (Official Charts)	48
Swiss Albums (Schweizer Hitparade)	14
UK Albums (Official Charts)	40
US Billboard 200	42
US Top Dance Albums (Billboard)	1

== Release history ==
Region	Date	Format(s)	Label
Australia	October 17, 2014	CD; digital download	Lokal Legend; Island
United States	October 21, 2014	CD; digital download	Lokal Legend; Island
United Kingdom	December 1, 2014	CD; digital download	Lokal Legend; Island
Brazil	February 25, 2015	CD	Universal Music
