= Take Ü There =

Single by Jack Ü featuring Kiesza

from the album Skrillex and Diplo Present Jack Ü
- Released: October 4, 2014
- Genre: Trap; EDM
- Length: 3:30
- Label: Atlantic; Mad Decent; Owsla
- Songwriters: Henry Walter; Kiesa Rae Ellestad; Lukasz Gottwald; Thomas Pentz; Sonny Moore
- Producers: Skrillex; Diplo

Skrillex singles chronology
"Recess" (2014)	"Take Ü There" (2014)	"Dirty Vibe" (2014)

Diplo singles chronology
"XXX 88" (2013)	"Take Ü There" (2014)	"Dirty Vibe" (2014)

Kiesza singles chronology
"Giant in My Heart" (2014)	"Take Ü There" (2014)	"No Enemiesz" (2014)

Music video
- "Take Ü There" on YouTube

"Take Ü There" is the debut collaboration single by American EDM DJ duo Skrillex and Diplo together as Jack Ü, written and performed by the duo and Canadian singer Kiesza, and produced by the duo. It serves as the lead single from Jack Ü's debut studio album Skrillex and Diplo Present Jack Ü, and was released on October 4, 2014, through Skrillex's Owsla and Diplo's Mad Decent. It peaked at number 63 on the UK Singles Chart.

== Background ==
The song premiered at Diplo's Mad Decent Block Party on August 9, 2014.

== Music video ==
A music video for the song, directed by Joseph Kahn, Dillon Moore and Daniel Streit, was released in November 2014. The video combines real footage with animation.

== Critical reception ==
Issy Sampson of The Guardian chose the song as the best track of the week, writing that, "its playlist-friendly trap sound is mildly panic-inducing, like taking speed and then being told you have to go on live TV and explain the intricacies of Middle Eastern politics RIGHT NOW and is it OK if you do it in just your pants?".

== Remix ==
On February 3, 2015, the pair announced that they would be working with Missy Elliott on a remix to "Take Ü There".

== Track listing ==
Digital download – single
No.	Title	Length
1.	"Take Ü There" (featuring Kiesza)	3:30

Digital download – EP
No.	Title	Length
1.	"Take Ü There" (Zeds Dead Remix)	4:08
2.	"Take Ü There" (TJR Remix)	3:30
3.	"Take Ü There" (Vindata Remix)	3:25
4.	"Take Ü There" (Netsky Remix)	3:30
5.	"Take Ü There" (Felix Cartal Remix)	4:22
6.	"Take Ü There" (Tujamo Remix)	4:31
7.	"Take Ü There" (Tchami Remix)	4:34

== Charts ==
=== Weekly charts ===
Chart (2014–2015)	Peak position
Belgium (Ultratop 50 Flanders)	134
UK Singles (Official Charts)	63
UK Dance (Official Charts)	16
US Hot Dance/Electronic Songs (Billboard)	14

=== Year-end charts ===
Chart (2015)	Position
US Hot Dance/Electronic Songs (Billboard)	53

== Certifications ==
Region	Certification	Certified units/sales
United States (RIAA)	Platinum	1,000,000^{‡}
^{‡} Sales+streaming figures based on certification alone.
