= Philippe Sly =

Canadian opera singer

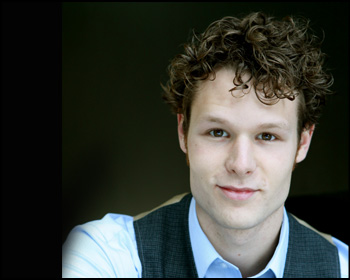

Background information
- Born: Canada
- Genres: Classical Music
- Occupations: Singer, performer
- Instrument: Voice - bass-baritone
- Label: Analekta
- Website: philippesly.com

Philippe Sly (born 1988 or 1989 in Ottawa) is a Canadian bass-baritone and opera, oratorio and recital singer.

== Biography ==
Sly grew up in Ottawa, joined local boys and adult choirs and studied music at McGill University. In 2011 he was one of the winners of the Metropolitan Opera National Council Auditions, during which time he was taught by Sanford Sylvan and was a recipient of the Choquette-Symcox Award, conferred by JM Canada Foundation and Jeunesses Musicales Canada. The following year, 2012, he won the Grand Prize of the Montreal International Musical Competition.

At San Francisco Opera, he joined the company's Merola training program in 2011 and won the SF Opera Adler Fellowship in 2013. Here in June 2013 he debuted as Guglielmo in Cosi fan tutte and in June 2015 as Figaro in Le nozze di Figaro. In June 2017 he debuted in the title role of Don Giovanni at Aix-en-Provence Festival. He sang as Leporello in Don Giovanni at the Opéra de Paris in June 2019 in the new production of Ivo Van Hove.

== Personal life ==
Sly is the father to two children.

== Recordings ==
With Analekta:

- In Dreams (2012): Robert Schumann, Dichterliebe; Maurice Ravel, Don Quichotte à Dulcinée; Guy Ropartz, Quatre poèmes d’après l’intermezzo d’Heinrich Heine; Jonathan Dove, Three Tennyson Songs.
- Rameau: Les Amants trahis (2013)
- Love's Minstrels: English Songs from the 19th and 20th Centuries (2014)
- Schubert Sessions: Lieder with guitar (2016)

== Discography ==
=== Singles ===
==== as featured artist ====
Title	Year	Album
"Phantom of the Dancefloor" (Kiesza featuring Philippe Sly)	2018	Non-album single

=== Songwriting credits ===
indicates a background vocal contribution.

Year	Artist	Album	Song	Co-written with
2019	Kiesza	TBA	"Sweet Love"	Kiesa Rae Ellestad, Kasper Falkenberg, Nicholas Furdal, Thomas Hull
