= Pushing On =

Single by Oliver $ & Jimi Jules
- Released: 31 August 2014
- Genre: Deep house
- Length: 5:12
- Label: Defected Records; Ministry of Sound
- Songwriter: Will Holland

Oliver $ singles chronology
| "Earl" (2013) | "Pushing On" (2014) |

Jimi Jules singles chronology
| "Earl" (2013) | "Pushing On" (2014) |

Pushing On is a dance single from German record producer Oliver $ and Swiss record producer Jimi Jules. It contains a sample of "Pushin' On" by the Quantic Soul Orchestra which was sung by Alice Russell (singer) and originally contained a sample of "Williams' Blood (Greg Wilson Mix)" by Grace Jones, which was subsequently replayed by Mark Summers at Scorccio Sample Replays, recreating all instrumental elements of the sample (piano, bass, etc.). It peaked at number 15 on the UK Singles Chart. The song was credited as the second most Shazamed track in Ibiza for 2014, having been frequently dropped by DJs in festival season. It also featured on the Xbox 360/One game Forza Horizon 2 on the in-game radio station "Horizon Bass Arena".

== Track listing ==
Digital download – single
| No. | Title | Length |
|---|---|---|
| 1. | "Pushing On" (Radio Edit) | 2:43 |

Digital download – EP
| No. | Title | Length |
|---|---|---|
| 1. | "Pushing On" (Jesse Rose 'Live from the Villa' Remix) | 6:20 |
| 2. | "Pushing On" (Tchami Remix) | 4:55 |
| 3. | "Pushing On" (Solid Groove Remix) | 6:01 |
| 4. | "Pushing On" (Delta Heavy Remix) | 4:16 |
| 5. | "Pushing On" (Extended Mix) | 5:12 |

== Charts ==
=== Weekly charts ===
| Chart (2014–15) | Peak position |
|---|---|
| Hungary (Dance Top 40) | 29 |
| Hungary (Rádiós Top 40) | 35 |
| Hungary (Single Top 40) | 37 |
| Poland Dance (ZPAV) | 12 |
| Scottish Singles Sales (Official Charts) | 11 |
| UK Singles (Official Charts) | 15 |
| UK Dance (Official Charts) | 5 |
| UK Indie (Official Charts) | 1 |
| US Hot Dance/Electronic Songs (Billboard) | 20 |
