= Hideaway (Kiesza song) =

2014 debut single by Kiesza

Single by Kiesza

from the EP Hideaway and Sound of a Woman
- Released: April 11, 2014
- Recorded: Summer 2013
- Studio: Rami Samir Afuni's Studio, New York City
- Genre: Deep house; EDM; pop
- Length: 4:11
- Label: Lokal Legend; Island
- Songwriters: Kiesa Rae Ellestad; Rami Samir Afuni
- Producer: Rami Samir Afuni

Kiesza singles chronology
"Triggerfinger" (2013)	"Hideaway" (2014)	"Giant in My Heart" (2014)

Music video
- "Hideaway" on YouTube

"Hideaway" is the debut single by Canadian recording musician Kiesza from her debut EP of the same name (2014) and her debut studio album, Sound of a Woman (2014). The song was released on April 11, 2014, through Island Records and co-writer Rami Samir Afuni's independent label Lokal Legend as the lead single from both the EP and the album.

Written by Kiesza and its producer Afuni, it was recorded in the summer of 2013 in New York City. "Hideaway" is a deep house song which comes from inspiration from both Kiesza and Afuni's passion for 1990s dance music. Both the song and its accompanying music video have been met with general acclaim from contemporary music critics. "Hideaway" topped the UK Singles Chart upon release, selling over 136,000 copies in its first week, becoming the third-fastest selling single of 2014 in the United Kingdom.

== Background ==
"It's a crazy story. I was just about to head to the airport to board a plane to LA. At the time, I was in New York City and I was going to head out there as my writing was picking up. I was ready to board a plane and Rami – the Record producer I work with – had started working on ['Hideaway'] in the studio and it sounded really cool. It reminded me of a lot of the people that I'm into, so I asked if I could jump on the mic before I had to go. The entire song just came out. Everything you hear was finished in an hour-and-a-half. It just poured out. I nearly missed my flight; it was like a scene from a movie. Two days later, I get this call from Rami saying, "I think you need to come back to New York." That's when I knew I'd found a sound that really worked for me. I ended up going back there and working on more tracks."

— Kiesza speaking to music website Planet Notion about the origins of "Hideaway".

"Hideaway" was co-written by Kiesza and Rami Samir Afuni, and produced by Afuni. Originally, Kiesza was familiar with composing traditional singer-songwriter music but after moving to New York City and meeting Afuni, she gradually grew into recording more uptempo music. Kiesza began collaborating with Afuni after landing at the Berklee College of Music. During the summer of 2013, Kiesza was preparing to board a flight from New York to Los Angeles when Afuni developed the beat for "Hideaway". Speaking to Jenna McMurray of the Calgary Sun, she mentioned, "I dropped my bags and went back into the studio." After arriving at Rami's studio, Kiesza produced a rough demo version of "Hideaway" before sitting down for ten minutes finishing its lyrics and then cutting vocals for the song. Kiesza freestyled the track's lyrics in an attempt to buy time in case she would miss her flight. The song was written by Kiesza and Afuni in an hour and mixed and mastered half an hour afterward. The development of the song was so brief that Kiesza was still able to board her flight to Los Angeles.

In an interview with Hattie Collins of i-D, Kiesza revealed that upon Afuni playing the beat for "Hideaway" she "jumped on the mic and it all came out," adding, "It just felt so natural". While recording the song, Kiesza was inspired by 1990s dance music which her mother would regularly listen to, of which included "big-throated divas" CeCe Peniston and Robin S. At the time, Kiesza had been a songwriter for two years and listened to other recording artists, namely Icona Pop, Kylie Minogue and Rihanna — however still eyeing a solo singing career of her own. As a result, she pursued recording solo material but "never stumbled on something that felt genuine" until "Hideaway" which she saw as a song that defined herself as a singer and connected with who she was. Kiesza and Afuni composed the song as a hybrid of pop and underground elements with the intention of portraying a genuine and different sound. Additionally, the pair were passionate about 1990s dance music and wanted "Hideaway" to serve as reflection of it. After recording the song and flying to Los Angeles, Kiesza received a phone call from Afuni who asked her to return to New York. Following this, Kiesza came to the conclusion that she had discovered a sound that efficiently worked for her and returned to New York to record other songs. In an interview with Michael Cragg of The Guardian, Kiesza revealed:

"I'd written a lot of music and explored different genres but everything else that I was singing, it was more like it wasn't for me. Rather than try and make something work I just decided to not over-think it and the first song I did after that was Hideaway."

Afuni then set up independent label, Lokal Legend to release "Hideaway" as a single, but after moving to London, it later came to Kiesza's realization that she had a potential hit on her hands with "Hideaway", however, at the time she felt she was an outsider in the music industry in the United Kingdom which she described as "very Zeitgeist". As a result, Kiesza held off releasing the track until January 2014 when she posted the song on SoundCloud, and later "shopped the song" around to disc jockeys in the United Kingdom before garnering the attention of BBC Radio 1's Annie Mac who "fell in love" with "Hideaway". Mac would play the song at clubs across the United Kingdom and on her radio show, resulting in "Hideaway" gaining momentum both critically and commercially.

== Composition ==
"Hideaway" (2014)
A 30-second sample of "Hideaway", where Kiesza sings the pre-chorus using high pitch and a sense of urgency, with the lyrics, "Baby, I love the way that there's nothing sure / Baby, don't stop me, hide away with me some more".

"Hideaway" is an uptempo pop, dance and deep house song which runs for a duration of four minutes and 11 seconds and is written in the key of G minor. It incorporates elements of electropop, and old school music over a sparse, 1990s trance-indebted backing track. Production-wise, the song is a combination of a thick vintage Chicago house bassline, a cracking drum machine and an EDM synthesizer. In addition to its hypnotic beat, Idolator's Robbie Daw deemed the track's synths "shiny, bleeping and booping."

With regard to the composition of "Hideaway", Robert Copsey of Digital Spy commented, "The thick bassline and throbbing drum machine on the minimal chorus is offset by emotional, towering verses packed to the brim with hooks." Vocally, "Hideaway" is sung with a sense of urgency using high pitch. Kiesza's higher pitch features in the song's verses, pre-chorus and middle eight, while in the chorus she produces a series of "guttural yelps". According to Huw Oliver from DIY Weekly the song "builds and builds but never droops, never resolves". Combining Kiesza's love for UK garage, house and pop music, the track melds the three genres "pristinely" and with "utmost drama", as noted by Planet Notion's Alex Cull. Musically, "Hideaway" has been deemed "classics-inspired," in addition to garnering comparisons with British electronic duo Disclosure and the late singer-songwriter Michael Jackson. It has been further noted as a hybrid of 1990s dance, house and club music. In an interview with Geoffrey Rowlands of the Gulf Times Kiesza said, "'Hideaway' is a deep house song but it's regarded as mainstream," adding, "That kind of thing doesn't happen in America or back home in Canada."

== Critical reception ==
"Hideaway" received universal acclaim from critics. Larry Fitzmaurice of Pitchfork praised "Hideaway" for its "distinctly shiny electropop feel" and 1990s dance rhythm, further deeming the song "a body-moving propulsion that perfectly fits Kiesza's strangulated vocal bleats." Digital Spy's Robert Copsey awarded the song a four (out of five)-star rating, lauding it as a thrilling debut that leaves its listener wondering what else Kiesza has tucked up her sleeve musically. In his review, Copsey also noted, "The song itself is club classics-inspired house; a genre that's currently clogging up much of the top 40, but Kiesza keeps it interesting by putting a distinctly pop twist on it." John Gentile from Rolling Stone complimented the track's bass and drum machine, while Kate Wills of The Independent dubbed the song a "90s dance epic". A writer for Popjustice awarded "Hideaway" an eight (out of ten)-star rating, calling it a great new tune that appropriately fits the bill of blending pop and dance music. The music website's writer went on to hint that based on the track's quality, Kiesza would become a name to look out for in the music industry in 2014. Jim Carroll of The Irish Times noted that the song alerted many of Kiesza's talents, adding, "An old-school dancefloor belter thanks to her mighty voice, "Hideaway" is just one string to the bow of this former ballerina, navy recruit, cruise ship singer and Miss Universe Canada contestant."

The Guardian journalist Michael Cragg hailed the song as a "sophisticated banger" and a "pre-summer anthem". James Masterson of About.com called the track "barnstorming" and an "intriguing production", further noting its bassline as "[the] most infectious you've heard since Christmas". Writing for Instinct in a review for "Hideaway", Jonathan Higbee quipped, "Looks like North America might finally have a contemporary pop/deep-house vocalist to compete on the charts against celebrated U.K. acts like Jessie Ware and Katy B." Higbee's view was echoed by Idolator's Robbie Daw who upon hearing the track predicted Kiesza to "break out in a big way, and move up to more towering heights." Additionally, Daw felt that "Hideaway" recalled the best of 1990s club music, deemed it "truly one of the great new pop discoveries of 2014." In agreement with Higbee and Daw, a writer for MuchMusic felt that "Hideaway" was "infectious" and would become one of the most successful songs of 2014.

Jon O'Brien of Yahoo! Celebrity honed the song as "the perfect mix of old and new" and "a future deep house classic", further highlighting the track's bassline as "the thickest and most addictive bassline you're likely to hear this year". O'Brien went on to praise Kiesza vocal performance on the song, lauding it as a "powerhouse" and "impressive", and felt that "Hideaway" would continue the run of "classy dance anthems" topping the charts in 2014. Daily Record music critic John Dingwall awarded the track a five (out of five)-star rating, commenting, "despite the fact that we're in the first flushes of spring, Hideaway already looks on course to be one of the biggest songs of the summer and there's no disputing that it is a top-class dance tune." While Huw Oliver from DIY Weekly hailed the song as energetic, "splashy" and a "brilliant house-pop thrill ride".

== Chart performance ==
"Hideaway" debuted at number one on the UK Singles Chart issued for April 26, 2014, replacing Sigma's "Nobody to Love" at the chart summit. It sold 136,000 copies in its first week, making it the third fastest-selling single of 2014 in the United Kingdom, behind Clean Bandit's featuring Jess Glynne's "Rather Be" (163,000) and Pitbull featuring Kesha's "Timber" (139,000). Upon this result, Kiesza told the Official Charts Company, "Being number one is the most amazing feeling ever, I just want to say thank you to everybody who's supported it," adding, "I never expected this at all when I created 'Hideaway'; it's amazing to see people come out the woodwork and fall in love with it, so thank you!" The single dropped to number two after selling 59,704 copies in its second week on the chart, accumulating a total of 195,990 copies sold in the United Kingdom as of April 28, 2014.

Elsewhere, in Ireland, the song entered at number 21 on the Irish Singles Chart for the week ending April 17, 2014 and has since held the position for two consecutive weeks. The single debuted at a position of number 58 on the Swiss Singles Chart on April 20, 2014, dropping ten places to number 68 in its second week. In the Flanders region of Belgium, "Hideaway" entered the Ultratip chart at number 72 on April 19, 2014 and has since peaked at a position of number 14. While in Belgium's Wallonia region, the song debuted at number 43 on the Ultratip chart issued for April 26, 2014. Additionally "Hideaway" has also appeared on component dance charts in the United Kingdom and in the Flanders of Belgium, peaking at number one and 37 respectively. The song impacted contemporary hit radio in the U.S. on July 1, 2014 where it peaked at number 17 on the Mainstream Top 40 chart and at number 51 on the Billboard Hot 100.

== Music video ==
In February 2014, Kiesza released the video for "Hideaway" through the indie label Lokal Legend. The video itself was filmed on July 9, 2013. Idolator considered it unique for having a single shot through the entire video (like Janet Jackson's music video for "When I Think of You" among others), as Kiesza walked and danced through the streets of Williamsburg, Brooklyn (Kent Ave & North 12th St). John Gentile of Rolling Stone called the style "impressive". Kiesza reported to Rolling Stone that she had a big problem making the video, partly because she broke a rib just before filming, and "couldn't move for an entire month afterward." It was premiered by Annie Mac on her Mac's Special Delivery segment on BBC Radio 1.

The video begins with a taxi and enters in with a faux hawk hairstyle. Kiesza is featured wearing a white bra, black suspenders, blue jeans and red sneakers. Kiesza is accompanied by dancers as she sings, walks and dances through the streets. The video concludes with Kiesza entering a taxi and being driven away. The video was filmed by Kiesza's brother, Blayre Ellestad, and co-produced by Kiesza, Rami Samir Afuni, and choreographer Ljuba Castot. "Hideaway" received a MTV Video Music Award nomination for Best Choreography. The unique and distinctive music video was parodied and remade a number of times. Especially popular was one done by Russian comedy duo Bonya and Kuzmich, which had received over 9.8 million views on YouTube as of October 2026, after being released in August 2014.

== Formats and track listings ==
- German CD single
1. "Hideaway" – 4:11
2. "Hideaway" (Extended) – 5:16
- US/Australian extended play
1. "Hideaway" – 4:11
2. "Giant in My Heart" – 4:29
3. "So Deep" – 4:28
4. "What Is Love" – 3:07
- US extended play Target edition
1. "Hideaway" – 4:14
2. "Giant in My Heart" – 4:31
3. "So Deep" – 4:30
4. "What Is Love" – 3:08
5. "Hideaway" (Gorgon City Remix) – 5:11
- Digital download – single
1. "Hideaway" – 4:11
- Bixel Boys Remix
1. "Hideaway" (Bixel Boys Remix) – 5:03
- Static Revenger vs Latroit Remix
1. "Hideaway" (Static Revenger vs Latroit Remix) – 5:49
- Zac Samuel Remix
1. "Hideaway" (Zac Samuel Remix) – 3:57

== Charts ==
=== Weekly charts ===
Weekly chart performance for "Hideaway"
Chart (2014–2015)	Peak position
Australia (ARIA)	25
Austria (Ö3 Austria Top 40)	17
Belgium (Ultratop 50 Flanders)	1
Belgium Dance (Ultratop Flanders)	1
Belgium (Ultratop 50 Wallonia)	3
Belgium Dance (Ultratop Wallonia)	3
Canada Hot 100 (Billboard)	5
Canada CHR/Top 40 (Billboard)	5
Canada Hot AC (Billboard)	5
CIS Airplay (TopHit)	1
Czech Republic Airplay (ČNS IFPI)	30
Czech Republic Singles Digital (ČNS IFPI)	20
Denmark (Tracklisten)	2
Euro Digital Song Sales (Billboard)	1
Finland Download (Latauslista)	29
France (SNEP)	24
Germany (GfK)	5
Greece Digital Songs (Billboard)	10
Hungary (Dance Top 40)	35
Hungary (Rádiós Top 40)	31
Hungary (Single Top 40)	7
Ireland (IRMA)	11
Italy (FIMI)	1
Luxembourg Digital Song Sales (Billboard)	6
Mexico Anglo (Monitor Latino)	4
Netherlands (Dutch Top 40)	4
Netherlands (Single Top 100)	1
Poland Airplay (ZPAV)	12
Poland Dance (ZPAV)	2
Russia Airplay (TopHit)	1
Scottish Singles Sales (Official Charts)	1
Slovakia Airplay (ČNS IFPI)	39
Slovakia Singles Digital (ČNS IFPI)	15
Slovenia (SloTop50)	42
Spain (Promusicae)	49
Switzerland (Schweizer Hitparade)	5
Ukraine Airplay (TopHit)	5
UK Singles (Official Charts)	1
UK Dance (Official Charts)	1
US Billboard Hot 100	51
US Hot Dance/Electronic Songs (Billboard)	7
US Dance Club Songs (Billboard)	5
US Pop Airplay (Billboard)	17
US Rhythmic Airplay (Billboard)	31

2015 weekly chart performance for "Hideaway"
Chart (2015)	Peak position
CIS Airplay (TopHit)	65
Russia Airplay (TopHit)	75
Ukraine Airplay (TopHit)	30

2016 weekly chart performance for "Hideaway"
Chart (2016)	Peak position
CIS Airplay (TopHit)	95
Russia Airplay (TopHit)	92
Ukraine Airplay (TopHit)	95

=== Monthly charts ===
2014 Monthly chart performance for "Hideaway"
Chart (2014)	Peak position
CIS Airplay (TopHit)	1
Russia Airplay (TopHit)	1
Ukraine Airplay (TopHit)	17

2015 Monthly chart performance for "Hideaway"
Chart (2015)	Peak position
CIS Airplay (TopHit)	83
Russia Airplay (TopHit)	98
Ukraine Airplay (TopHit)	40

=== Year-end charts ===
2014 year-end chart performance for "Hideaway"
Chart (2014)	Position
Austria (Ö3 Austria Top 40)	50
Belgium (Ultratop Flanders)	9
Belgium (Ultratop Wallonia)	25
Canada (Canadian Hot 100)	29
CIS Airplay (TopHit)	15
France (SNEP)	112
Germany (Official German Charts)	20
Hungary (Single Top 40)	19
Italy (FIMI)	19
Netherlands (Dutch Top 40)	26
Netherlands (Single Top 100)	23
Russia Airplay (TopHit)	13
Switzerland (Schweizer Hitparade)	22
UK Singles (Official Charts Company)	15
Ukraine Airplay (TopHit)	46
US Dance Club Songs (Billboard)	19
US Hot Dance/Electronic Songs (Billboard)	17

2015 year-end chart performance for "Hideaway"
Chart (2015)	Position
CIS Airplay (TopHit)	123
Russia Airplay (TopHit)	122

== Certifications ==
Region	Certification	Certified units/sales
Australia (ARIA)	Platinum	70,000^{‡}
Belgium (BRMA)	Gold	15,000^{*}
Brazil (Pro-Música Brasil)	Platinum	60,000^{‡}
Canada (Music Canada)	2× Platinum	194,000
Germany (BVMI)	Platinum	300,000^{‡}
Italy (FIMI)	3× Platinum	90,000^{‡}
New Zealand (RMNZ)	Platinum	30,000^{‡}
Sweden (GLF)	Platinum	40,000^{‡}
Switzerland (IFPI Switzerland)	Gold	15,000^{^}
United Kingdom (BPI)	2× Platinum	1,200,000^{‡}
United States (RIAA)	Gold	500,000^{‡}
Streaming
Denmark (IFPI Danmark)	Platinum	2,600,000^{†}
^{*} Sales figures based on certification alone.^{^} Shipments figures based on certification alone.^{‡} Sales+streaming figures based on certification alone.^{†} Streaming-only figures based on certification alone.

== Release history ==
Region	Date	Format	Label
United Kingdom	April 11, 2014	Digital download	Lokal Legend
Switzerland	April 11, 2014	Digital download	Lokal Legend
United States	April 14, 2014	Digital download	Chronicles; Lokal Legend
United States	July 1, 2014	Contemporary hit radio	Lokal Legend; 4th & B'way; Island; Republic

== See also ==
- List of number-one hits of 2014 (Scotland)
- List of UK Dance Chart number-one singles of 2014
- List of UK Singles Chart number ones of the 2010s
