= List of UK R&B Singles Chart number ones of 2014 =

The logo of the Official Charts Company, responsible for compiling all of the official music charts in the United Kingdom, including the R&B singles chart.

The UK R&B Chart is a weekly chart that ranks the 40 biggest-selling singles and albums that are classified in the R&B genre in the United Kingdom. The chart is compiled by the Official Charts Company and is based on both physical and digital sales. The following are the number-one singles of 2014.

== Number-one singles ==
Key
†	Best-selling R&B single of the year

Issue date (week ending)	Single	Artist(s)	Record label	References
4 January	"Trumpets"	Jason Derulo	Warner	
11 January ^{[a]}	"Timber"	Pitbull featuring Kesha	Polo Grounds/RCA/Mr. 305	
18 January	"Timber"	Pitbull featuring Kesha	Polo Grounds/RCA/Mr. 305	
25 January	"Timber"	Pitbull featuring Kesha	Polo Grounds/RCA/Mr. 305	
1 February	"Timber"	Pitbull featuring Kesha	Polo Grounds/RCA/Mr. 305	
8 February	"Feelin' Myself"	will.i.am featuring Miley Cyrus, French Montana & Wiz Khalifa	Interscope	
15 February	"Feelin' Myself"	will.i.am featuring Miley Cyrus, French Montana & Wiz Khalifa	Interscope	
22 February	"Feelin' Myself"	will.i.am featuring Miley Cyrus, French Montana & Wiz Khalifa	Interscope	
1 March	"Timber"	Pitbull featuring Kesha	Polo Grounds/RCA/Mr. 305	
8 March	"Timber"	Pitbull featuring Kesha	Polo Grounds/RCA/Mr. 305	
15 March	"Timber"	Pitbull featuring Kesha	Polo Grounds/RCA/Mr. 305	
22 March	"How I Feel"	Flo Rida	Atlantic	
29 March	"How I Feel"	Flo Rida	Atlantic	
5 April	"Loyal"	Chris Brown featuring Lil Wayne & Tyga	RCA	
12 April ^{[a]}	"The Man"	Aloe Blacc	Interscope	
19 April ^{[b]}	"The Man"	Aloe Blacc	Interscope	
26 April ^{[b]}	"All Of Me"†	John Legend	GOOD Music/Columbia	
3 May	"All Of Me"†	John Legend	GOOD Music/Columbia	
10 May ^{[b]}	"All Of Me"†	John Legend	GOOD Music/Columbia	
17 May ^{[b]}	"All Of Me"†	John Legend	GOOD Music/Columbia	
24 May ^{[b]}	"All Of Me"†	John Legend	GOOD Music/Columbia	
31 May	"All Of Me"†	John Legend	GOOD Music/Columbia	
7 June	"All Of Me"†	John Legend	GOOD Music/Columbia	
14 June	"All Of Me"†	John Legend	GOOD Music/Columbia	
21 June	"Wiggle"	Jason Derulo featuring Snoop Dogg	Warner	
28 June	"Wiggle"	Jason Derulo featuring Snoop Dogg	Warner	
5 July	"Wiggle"	Jason Derulo featuring Snoop Dogg	Warner	
12 July	"All Of Me"†	John Legend	GOOD Music/Columbia	
19 July	"All Of Me"†	John Legend	GOOD Music/Columbia	
26 July	"All Of Me"†	John Legend	GOOD Music/Columbia	
2 August	"All Of Me"†	John Legend	GOOD Music/Columbia	
9 August	"Kisses For Breakfast"	Melissa Steel featuring Popcaan	Warner	
16 August ^{[b]}	"All Of Me"†	John Legend	GOOD Music/Columbia	
23 August ^{[b]}	"All Of Me"†	John Legend	GOOD Music/Columbia	
30 August	"Black Widow"	Iggy Azalea featuring Rita Ora	Def Jam	
6 September	"Black Widow"	Iggy Azalea featuring Rita Ora	Def Jam	
13 September	"Black Widow"	Iggy Azalea featuring Rita Ora	Def Jam	
20 September	"Black Widow"	Iggy Azalea featuring Rita Ora	Def Jam	
27 September	"Lullaby"	Professor Green featuring Tori Kelly	Virgin	
4 October ^{[b]}	"Lullaby"	Professor Green featuring Tori Kelly	Virgin	
11 October	"Let It Be"	Labrinth	Syco	
18 October	"Anaconda"	Nicki Minaj	Young Money/Cash Money/Republic	
25 October	"Don't Tell 'Em"	Jeremih featuring YG	Def Jam	
1 November	"Don't Tell 'Em"	Jeremih featuring YG	Def Jam	
8 November	"Don't Tell 'Em"	Jeremih featuring YG	Def Jam	
15 November ^{[b]}	"All Of Me"†	John Legend	GOOD Music/Columbia	
22 November ^{[b]}	"All Of Me"†	John Legend	GOOD Music/Columbia	
29 November	"All Of Me"†	John Legend	GOOD Music/Columbia	
6 December	"All Of Me"†	John Legend	GOOD Music/Columbia	
13 December	"All Of Me"†	John Legend	GOOD Music/Columbia	
20 December	"All Of Me"†	John Legend	GOOD Music/Columbia	
27 December	"All Of Me"†	John Legend	GOOD Music/Columbia	

== Notes ==
- ^{a} - The single was simultaneously number-one on the UK Singles Chart.
- ^{b} - The artist was simultaneously number-one on the R&B Albums Chart.

== See also ==
- List of UK Singles Chart number ones of 2014
- List of UK R&B Chart number-one albums of 2014
- List of UK Dance Chart number-one singles of 2014
