= Power Music =

- Founded: 1987
- Founder: Richard Petty
- Status: Active
- Genre: Dance/Workout
- Country of origin: United States
- Location: Salt Lake City, UT
- Official website: http://www.powermusic.com/ http://www.workoutmusic.com http://www.clixmix.com

Power Music is an American record label based in Salt Lake City, UT. Their catalog is composed entirely of rerecorded popular songs to specific Beats Per Minute as part of a non-stop workout mix.

Power Music, Inc. developed a series of albums for the NBC show The Biggest Loser, Shape magazine, and Carmen Electra.

Power Music's catalog is distributed digitally on their websites, including one such site, ClickMix.com, that uses proprietary technology to allow users to create their own compilation of workout music by choosing the tracks and the tempo.

Power Music used to be known as Power Productions and were originally based out of Gaithersburg, MD.

== Selected discography ==
Title	Year	Peak chart positions				
Title	Year	US Dance	US Indie	AUT	NLD (Note: MegaCharts' Album Top 100, the official albums chart for The Netherlands does not list compilation albums including those from Power Music. However, Power Music records have landed on the CombiAlbum chart, which is a list of popular artist and compilation albums combined. Thus, all of the Netherlands peak positions listed here will be those on the CombiAlbum chart, not the Album Top 100.)	SWI
Power Music Workout: Best Of 2011 Workout Mix: 60 Min Non-Stop	2012	21	—	—	—	—
Runtastic Workout Mix	2013	—	—	13	—	—
Runtastic Workout Mix Vol. 2	2013	—	—	8	—	—
Runtastic Workout Mix Vol. 3	2014	—	—	18	—	—
Runtastic Music – Running Vol. 1	2014	—	—	4	—	—
Runtastic Music – Running Vol. 2	2014	—	—	6	61	3
Runtastic Music – Running Vol. 3	2015	—	—	8	—	—
Runtastic - Power Workout - Volume 1	2016	—	—	15	—	—
55 Smash Hits! – Running Remixes, Vol. 3	2016	5	26	—	—	—
Best Of 2016 Workout Mix	2017	14	—	—	—	—

== See also ==
Power Music http://www.powermusic.com Workout Music http://www.workoutmusic.com ClickMix http://www.clickmix.com
