= Jimi Jules =

Swiss musician and DJ

Jimi Jules is a Swiss musician and DJ. His biggest success was a 2014 collaboration with the musician Oliver Dollar on the single "Pushing On" which peaked at number 15 on the UK Singles Chart.

== Discography ==
- 2012 - Awakenings (EP)
- 2013 - Earl (EP)
- 2014 - "Come Along" / "Wide" (with Animal Trainer)
- 2014 - "Pushing On" (with Oliver Dollar)
- 2014 - "Hello Asshole"
- 2015 - No Wishes (EP)
- 2016 - Bogotá (EP)
- 2016 - Lost Love (EP)
- 2016 - Equinox
- 2018 - Midnight Juggernaut (EP)
- 2019 - Karma Baby (EP)
- 2019 - Fool (EP)
- 2021 - Ham the Monkey (EP)
- 2021 - My City's On Fire (EP)
- 2022 - Burning (Single)
- 2022 - +
