= Oliver Dollar =

Oliver Siebert, better known by his stage name Oliver Dollar (sometimes stylised as Oliver $) is a German record producer. He was born in Berlin. His collaboration with Jimi Jules, "Pushing On", peaked at number 15 on the UK Singles Chart. The song was credited as the second most Shazamed track in Ibiza for 2014, having been frequently dropped by DJs in festival season.
