= List of UK R&B Albums Chart number ones of 2014 =

The logo of the Official Charts Company, responsible for compiling all of the official music charts in the United Kingdom, including the R&B albums chart.

The UK R&B Chart is a weekly chart, first introduced in October 1994, that ranks the 40 biggest-selling singles and albums that are classified in the R&B genre in the United Kingdom. The chart is compiled by the Official Charts Company, and is based on sales of CDs, downloads, vinyl and other formats over the previous seven days.

The following are the number-one albums of 2014.

== Number-one albums ==
Issue date	Album	Artist(s)	Record label	Ref.
5 January	Beyoncé	Beyoncé	Parkwood/Columbia	
12 January	Beyoncé	Beyoncé	Parkwood/Columbia	
19 January	The Trevor Nelson Collection 2	Various Artists	Sony Music Entertainment	
26 January	The Trevor Nelson Collection 2	Various Artists	Sony Music Entertainment	
2 February	The Trevor Nelson Collection 2	Various Artists	Sony Music Entertainment	
9 February	The Trevor Nelson Collection 2	Various Artists	Sony Music Entertainment	
16 February	The Trevor Nelson Collection 2	Various Artists	Sony Music Entertainment	
23 February	Beyoncé	Beyoncé	Parkwood/Columbia	
2 March	Beyoncé	Beyoncé	Parkwood/Columbia	
9 March	G I R L	Pharrell Williams	i Am Other/Columbia	
16 March	G I R L	Pharrell Williams	i Am Other/Columbia	
23 March	G I R L	Pharrell Williams	i Am Other/Columbia	
30 March	Love in the Future	John Legend	GOOD Music/Columbia	
6 April	Love in the Future	John Legend	GOOD Music/Columbia	
13 April ^{[b]}	Lift Your Spirit	Aloe Blacc	Interscope	
20 April	Love in the Future	John Legend	GOOD Music/Columbia	
27 April	The New Classic	Iggy Azalea	Island	
4 May	Love in the Future	John Legend	GOOD Music/Columbia	
11 May	Love in the Future	John Legend	GOOD Music/Columbia	
18 May	Love in the Future	John Legend	GOOD Music/Columbia	
25 May	G I R L	Pharrell Williams	i Am Other/Columbia	
1 June	G I R L	Pharrell Williams	i Am Other/Columbia	
8 June	Animal Ambition	50 Cent	G-Unit Records	
15 June	G I R L	Pharrell Williams	i Am Other/Columbia	
22 June	Pure R&B 90's	Various Artists	WMTV221	
29 June	Pure R&B 90's	Various Artists	WMTV221	
6 July	Trigga	Trey Songz	Atlantic	
13 July	Chilled R&B: The Gold Edition	Various Artists	Sony Music	
20 July	Chilled R&B: The Gold Edition	Various Artists	Sony Music	
27 July	G I R L	Pharrell Williams	i Am Other/Columbia	
3 August	The Ultimate Collection	Whitney Houston	Arista	
10 August ^{[b]}	Love in the Future	John Legend	GOOD Music/Columbia	
17 August ^{[b]}	Love in the Future	John Legend	GOOD Music/Columbia	
24 August	The Grandmaster Flash Collection	Various Artists	Sony Music	
31 August	The Grandmaster Flash Collection	Various Artists	Sony Music	
7 September	The Grandmaster Flash Collection	Various Artists	Sony Music	
14 September	Goddess	Banks	Harvest	
21 September	X	Chris Brown	RCA	
28 September ^{[b]}	Growing Up in Public	Professor Green	Virgin Records	
5 October	Art Official Age	Prince	NPG Records/Warner Bros. Records	
12 October	X	Chris Brown	RCA	
19 October	G I R L	Pharrell Williams	i Am Other/Columbia	
26 October	G I R L	Pharrell Williams	i Am Other/Columbia	
2 November	Dead	Young Fathers	Anticon	
9 November ^{[b]}	Love in the Future	John Legend	GOOD Music/Columbia	
16 November ^{[b]}	Love in the Future	John Legend	GOOD Music/Columbia	
23 November	Back to Black	Amy Winehouse	Island	
30 November	Shady XV	Various Artists	Shady Records/Interscope	
7 December	Greatest Hits	Luther Vandross	Epic	
14 December	2014 Forest Hills Drive	J. Cole	Dreamville/Roc Nation/Columbia	
21 December	The Pinkprint	Nicki Minaj	Young Money/Cash Money/Republic Records	
28 December ^{[b]}	Love in the Future	John Legend	GOOD Music/Columbia	

== Notes ==
- ^{a} - The album was simultaneously number-one on the UK albums chart.
- ^{b} - The artist was simultaneously number-one on the R&B singles chart.

== See also ==
- List of UK Albums Chart number ones of 2014
- List of UK R&B Chart number-one singles of 2014
