= Giant in My Heart =

Single by Kiesza

from the EP Hideaway and the album Sound of a Woman
- Released: August 8, 2014
- Genre: Electropop; house
- Length: 4:29
- Label: Lokal Legend
- Songwriters: Kiesa Rae Ellestad; Rami Samir Afuni
- Producer: Rami Samir Afuni

Kiesza singles chronology
"Hideaway" (2014)	"Giant in My Heart" (2014)	"Bad Thing" (2014)

"Giant in My Heart" is a song by Canadian recording artist Kiesza from her debut EP Hideaway (2014) and her debut studio album, Sound of a Woman (2014). It was released by record label Lokal Legend as the second single from both the EP and the album on August 8, 2014. The song was co-written by Kiesza and Rami Samir Afuni, and produced by the latter. "Giant in My Heart" is an electropop and house track sung in an emotive falsetto tone and features a combination of scat-singing, a pounding 808 and softer synth-led sections. Lyrically, the song focuses on subjects of love lost and the aftermath of a breakup.

"Giant in My Heart" garnered positive reviews from contemporary music critics, who commended the song for its sonic similarities with Kiesza's debut single "Hideaway" and the singer's strong vocal performance. It was a commercial success, debuting at number four on the UK Singles Chart, number one on the UK Dance Chart and selling 33,414 copies in its first week. "Giant in My Heart" marked Kiesza's second consecutive top five single in the United Kingdom and has also had success in Germany and Belgium where it peaked at numbers 11 and 12 respectively. The song was accompanied by a short film music video directed by producer Afuni in New York City. The clip premiered on July 1, 2014 and was acclaimed by several critics. It features a frustrated male office worker living a double life as a crossdresser. Kiesza has performed "Giant in My Heart" on American television show Jimmy Kimmel Live!, and the song has been covered by English singer Florrie.

== Background ==
"Giant in My Heart" was written by Kiesza and Rami Samir Afuni, and produced by the latter. In an interview with KAMP-FM's Carson Daly, Kiesza elaborated on the anonymous male vocalist featured in "Giant in My Heart",

"I've never actually met him. My friend, who was my roommate, we were like, 'I need a voice of like, an older, black guy.' You know that like soulful, old man voice? And then my friend's like, 'I know someone!' So, we just sent it to him and he brings it back and this was the voice and we were like, 'Awesome!'"

The song serves as the second single from Kiesza's forthcoming debut album, Sound of a Woman (2014). It was premiered on Annie Mac's BBC Radio 1 show on June 13, 2014. "Giant in My Heart" was digitally released as a single and four-track remixes extended play (EP) in the United Kingdom on August 8, 2014. A two-track CD single was later released in Germany on September 5, 2014.

== Composition ==
"Giant in My Heart" is an electropop and house song which runs for a duration of four minutes and 29 seconds. It incorporates elements of garage and 1990s-inspired music The song opens with subtle electronic smatterings, distinctly grave sounding synths, and the lyrics "I'm trying to pretend it isn't true, but even when I want, it's like I can't get over you, over you, over you, over you." According to Michael Baggs of Gigwise, Kiesza solicits "powerful, diva-esque vocals, before building to a seriously retro hook". "Giant in My Heart" is set in the time signature of common time, with a moderately fast tempo of 124 beats per minute. It is composed in the key of G minor with Kiesza's vocals spanning the tonal nodes of G_{3} to G_{5}. It features a pounding 808 which fades into softer synth-led sections that space out Kiesza's vocal range and emotive falsetto tone. Funk-inspired scat-singing performed by an anonymous male vocalist begins featuring midway through the song. Lyrically, "Giant in My Heart" deals with subjects of heartbreak, love lost and the aftermath of a breakup. Musically, the track has been compared to its predecessor "Hideaway" for having a similar simplistic, bass-rooted, house inspired dance sound; the song's production is however fuller and more rounded-off than "Hideaway".

== Critical reception ==
"Giant in My Heart" was positively received by contemporary music critics. Digital Spy's Amy Davidson awarded the song a three (out of five)-star rating and stated that it successfully showcased "the sheer power" in Kiesza's vocal abilities. Davidson felt that the track proved that the singer "has the potential to push boundaries and create sounds that stand apart from the acres of generic dance music that saturate the current state of music". Killian Young of Spin deemed the song "a gem" and opined that "Kiesza's commanding voice triumphs over the heartbreak". Vice journalist Ryan Bassil felt that "Giant in My Heart" would become "absolutely massive", while Tina Campbell of Metro said the song is "sure to get you heading to the dance-floor." Music website Popjustice awarded the song an eight (out of ten)-star rating and mentioned, "Ambition, talent, a refreshing songwriting sensibility and a working knowledge of dance music that sounds like pop music as well as pop music that sounds like dance music. There aren't many artists you can say that about." Michael Baggs of Gigwise felt that "Giant in My Heart" proved that Kiesza was not a one-hit wonder and wrote, "It's pretty damn good, and suggests she has a big future ahead of her."

UK radio station Kiss deemed it "another big house track" and opined that it would become a definite commercial success for the singer. Robbie Daw of Idolator felt that "Giant in My Heart" was a "fantastic" follow-up to "Hideaway" and stated, "[the song is] a nice gesture toward fans who got on board with her retro sound, given that debut singles can often be misleading representations of an artist's overall material these days." Marissa Muller of CBS Radio felt that "Giant in My Heart" built on the "diva vocals" and "lose yourself-beat" that made "Hideaway" a success. Idol Magazine's Margherita Maspero described the song as having a "winning formula of dance beats, electronica pounding and catchy lyrics." Maspero concluded,"With a good dose of 90s nostalgia, the track is a rhythmic powerhouse that will get you on your feet from start to finish."

== Chart performance ==
Upon the release of "Giant in My Heart" in the United Kingdom, the Official Charts Company published that the song was the highest new entry of the week at number three on the midweek UK Singles Chart. It went on to debut at number four with 33,414 copies sold in its first week. "Giant in My Heart" marked Kiesza's second consecutive top five hit and spent a total of five weeks on the chart. It was more successful on the UK Dance Chart where it became the singer's second number one single. Elsewhere, "Giant in My Heart" peaked at number 11 in Germany, number 12 in Belgium, number 47 on US Hot Dance/Electronic Songs, number 53 in Austria, and number 72 in Ireland.

== Music video ==
=== Background and development ===
"One of the main characters in the video never showed up for the shoot. So I had to get one of my friends to take his place. There's some drag queens in the video, and the character who didn't show up was a drag queen, so my friend, who's actually like a well-known writer, stepped up. And dressed up in drag! He's completely straight, and just the best sport ever."

—Kiesza on the filming of the music video for "Giant in My Heart".

Following the low-budget clip for predecessor "Hideaway", Kiesza chose to make a short film for "Giant in My Heart" that would be different in style and content in comparison to the former. The music video was shot in New York City, where one of the clip's main crossdressing characters failed to show up for filming. As a result, Kiesza called on one of her close friends, a well-known writer, as the replacement for the video's absent character. It was directed by the song's producer Rami Samir Afuni. Jason Ano was responsible for the visual's camera operations while Joseph Robbins handled its visual effects and editing. Thematically, the clip draws parallels between the constraints of the mundaneness of life, and the constraints of being a cross dressing man in our society. The music video premiered on Kiesza's Vevo channel on July 1, 2014.

=== Synopsis ===
The video sees a male office worker living a double life. During the day he is seen going through the motions of his job where he suffers several inconveniences and misfortunes. While after hours, he returns to his apartment and resorts to an alter ego of a drag queen as a coping mechanism for his occupational stress and being bullied and pushed around at work. The man's crossdress includes a long black wig, a sparkling blue dress, and a pair of stilettos. He then joins two like-minded crossdressing friends as they take to the streets of New York City. The three later arrive at club where Kiesza is seen performing. Idolator reviewer Robbie Daw noted, "Kiesza takes the backseat in this one by playing the part of a club performer who gives a little inspiration to our troubled hero (ine)". During her performance at the club, Kiesza engages in a '90s-inspired dance sequence. The man's crossdressing personality is secretively portrayed as more care-free and confident than his one while at work. The video ends with the man frustrated and dispensing of his bosses in an office with a stapler, and later resigning.

=== Reception ===
The music video was met with positive reviews from critics. Tina Campbell of Metro deemed the clip "quirky" and described the drag queen portrayed as "fierce". In a review of the music video, Theo Eze from MUZU.TV noted, "I was surprised to see the video raise eyebrows online, with the criticism centring on the focus of the video on the cross dressing, making me feel like I may have accidentally slipped back into the 80's or some other time when others happiness was so discomforting to us." Eze went on to highlight the scene where the man attacks his boss with a stapler as "not the best plan of action but his resourcefulness is nonetheless admirable". MuchMusic honed the clip as an inspiration for its viewers. CBS Radio reviewer Marissa Muller commended the video for being a definite departure from the visual for "Hideaway", she also praised Kiesza's "great dance sequence in theme with the song's '90s vibes."

== Live performances and cover versions ==
Kiesza first performed "Giant in My Heart" at XOYO in London on June 3, 2014. Andre Paine of the London Evening Standard positively reviewed the performance writing, "Her stirring vocals over the insidious groove of 'Giant in My Heart' were as bold as her choreography." On July 30, 2014, the singer reprised the song on Jimmy Kimmel Live!. Dan Macrae of Entertainment Tonight Canada praised the Kiesza's "kick-heavy dance moves" during the performance. On August 14, 2014, the singer performed an acoustic version of the track during a NME Basement Session.

"Giant in My Heart" was covered by English singer Florrie during an acoustic session on July 29, 2014. Idolator's Bradley Stern praised the version, writing, "[Florrie] turns the bouncy House anthem into a truly gorgeous, gentle guitar-led production — that is, before she starts riffing loudly against a lively guitar strum. The cover showcases not only Florrie's more than capable chops, but her ability to really kill it as a guitarist."

== Formats and track listings ==
- CD single
1. "Giant in My Heart" – 4:29
2. "Giant in My Heart" (Billon Remix) – 5:29
- Digital remixes EP
1. "Giant in My Heart" (Billon Remix) – 5:29
2. "Giant in My Heart" (Blood Diamonds Remix) – 5:20
3. "Giant in My Heart" (No Artificial Colours Remix) – 5:39
4. "Giant in My Heart" (Archers Remix) – 5:49

== Charts ==
Chart (2014)	Peak position
Austria (Ö3 Austria Top 40)	53
Belgium (Ultratop 50 Flanders)	12
Belgium (Ultratip Bubbling Under Flanders)	1
Belgium (Ultratop 50 Wallonia)	43
Belgium (Ultratip Bubbling Under Wallonia)	21
Belgium Dance (Ultratop Flanders)	5
Belgium Dance (Ultratop Wallonia)	38
Canada Hot 100 (Billboard)	52
Canada CHR/Top 40 (Billboard)	18
Canada Hot AC (Billboard)	33
Germany (GfK)	11
Ireland (IRMA)	72
Poland (Dance Top 50)	32
Scotland Singles (OCC)	4
Switzerland (Schweizer Hitparade)	48
UK Dance (OCC)	1
UK Singles (OCC)	4
US Hot Dance/Electronic Songs (Billboard)	47

== Release history ==
Country	Date	Format	Label
United Kingdom	August 8, 2014	Digital download	Lokal Legend
Germany	September 5, 2014	CD single	Lokal Legend

== See also ==
- List of UK Dance Chart number-one singles of 2014
- List of UK top 10 singles in 2014
