= Kiesza =

Canadian singer (born 1989)

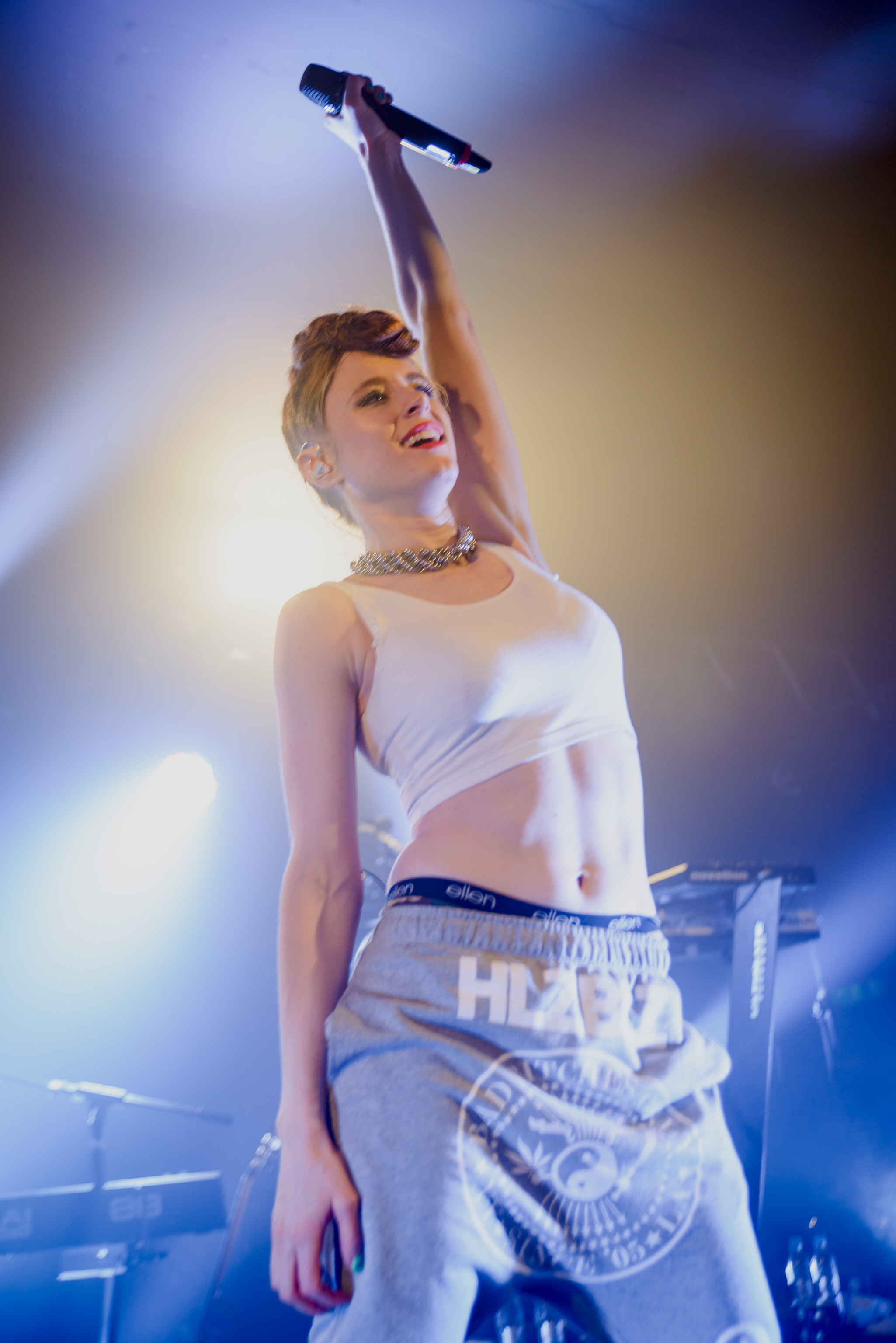
- Kiesza performing in 2015

Background information
- Born: Kiesa Rae Ellestad; January 16, 1989 (age 37); Calgary, Alberta, Canada
- Genres: House; pop; electronic
- Occupations: Singer; songwriter
- Instruments: Vocals; guitar; keyboards
- Years active: 2005–present
- Labels: Lokal Legend; Island; Reverse Psycho Logic
- Website: kiesza.com
- Military career
- Branch: Canadian Forces Naval Reserve

Kiesa Rae Ellestad (born January 16, 1989), known professionally as Kiesza (/ˈkaɪzə/ KY-zə), is a Canadian singer and multi-instrumentalist from Calgary. She has released multiple singles, including "Hideaway" and "Giant in My Heart", as well as the albums Sound of a Woman (2014) and Crave (2020). She has also toured, both as headliner and as opening act, and she has earned several nominations and won multiple awards.

== Early life ==
Kiesza was born on January 16, 1989, in Calgary, where she was also raised. Her surname, Ellestad, is Norwegian from her paternal side, and her paternal grandfather is from Fagernes in Norway. In an interview with Metro in July 2014, Kiesza claimed that she can trace her lineage to someone who fought alongside Robert the Bruce at the Battle of Bannockburn, elaborating, "There's a lot of Scottish people in Canada. Tons. My grandpa was of Scottish heritage—he was of the black Douglases."

At 13, Kiesza took a sailing class at summer camp and continued her interest past age 16, when she took part in the Sail and Life Training Society program. She later became a sailing instructor at the Glenmore Sailing School, in 2007. A year after, she joined the reserves of the Royal Canadian Navy, along with her brother, becoming a Naval Communicator. She taught herself to play guitar during crew singalongs in the Navy.

Meanwhile, she also entered the Miss Universe Canada pageant. She stated that her time in the Navy motivated her to give away 4,500 CDs to Canadian troops serving in Afghanistan in 2008. Kiesza took part in the Young Canadians program, a singing and dancing group that performed at the Calgary Stampede, where she trained in jazz and tap dancing as well as theatre. She also trained as a ballerina, but a knee injury at age 15 ended her ballet career. When Kiesza was 18, she said that her parents' divorce inspired her to write her first song as a way of expressing her feelings. The same year, she heard one of her songs played on the radio.

== Music career ==
=== 2005–2013: Career beginnings ===
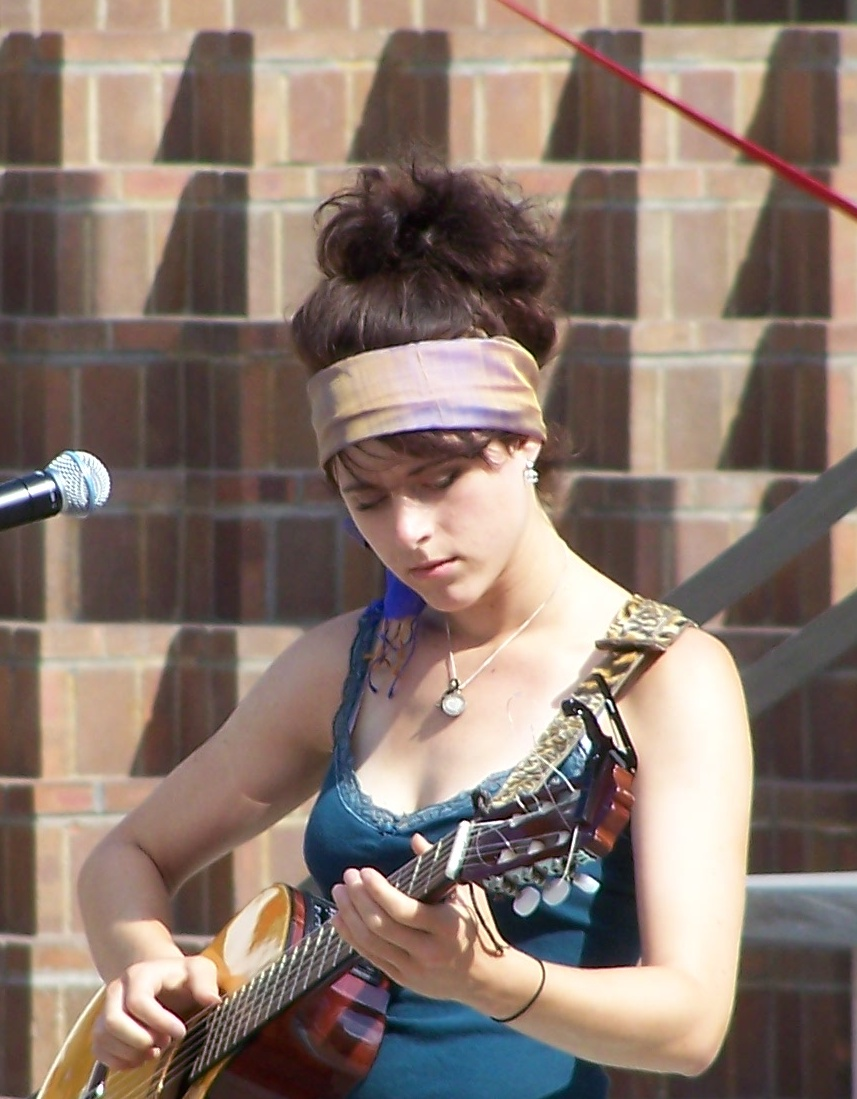
Kiesza performing at Olympic Plaza in downtown Calgary, July 2007

In 2005, CKUA Folk Routes host Tom Coxworth selected Kiesza to perform for a live audience and to be broadcast live on his radio show. Shortly after, she was accepted to Selkirk College in Nelson, British Columbia, where she studied keyboard, voice, and guitar; she graduated in 2009. Next, Kiesza won a scholarship to attend Berklee College of Music in Boston, Massachusetts. Afterward, she went to New York City in 2010 to advance her music career. Although she started as mainly a folk singer, after attending Berklee and then living in New York, she moved to a more "uptempo sound", on which she worked with producer Rami Samir Afuni. In 2010, she was selected to play at the Canada Day celebrations at Trafalgar Square in London, to 30,000 people.

In 2012, Kiesza released her first single after starting work with Afuni in New York, a "disco-infused pop" song titled "Oops". She labelled her style of music at the time as "SteamPop", described by ArjanWrites as "a flaming brew of bold, boisterous pop filled with tongue-in-cheek lyrics". In a 2014 interview, Kiesza said "Oops" was made as a joke. In 2013, the singer was featured in the single "Triggerfinger" by the Norwegian band Donkeyboy. She also wrote music for other artists, such as Rihanna, Kylie Minogue, and Icona Pop.

=== 2014–2016: Sound of a Woman ===
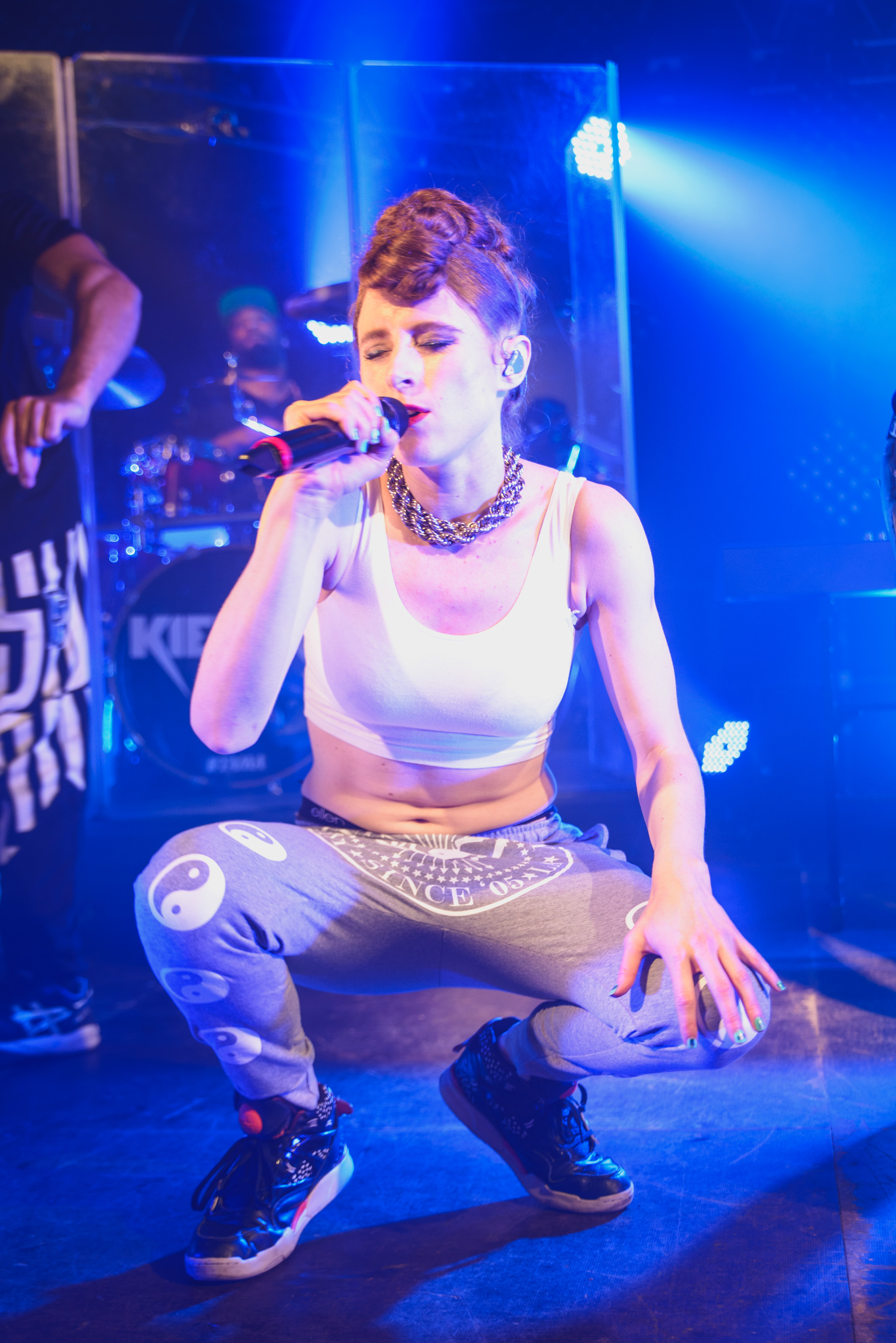
Kiesza in Munich, 2015

In February 2014, Kiesza released the video for the single "Hideaway", through the label Lokal Legend. Frank Alex of Vanity Fair considered it her "breakout solo single". Idolator called it unique for having a long take throughout the entire video, as Kiesza walked and danced through N 12th Street in Brooklyn, New York City. Kiesza reported to Rolling Stone that she had trouble making the video, partly because she broke a rib just before filming and "couldn't move for an entire month afterward". The video was premiered by Annie Mac on her Mac's Special Delivery segment on BBC Radio 1. "Hideaway" debuted at number one on the UK Singles Chart. The song, written and recorded by Kiesza in less than 90 minutes, achieved further success, with its music video amassing over 135 million views by October 2014, and it also took the top spot on two UK charts and peaked at No. 3 on the Billboard Dance Airplay chart.

Shortly after "Hideaway" charted, Kiesza released a new video for her cover of Haddaway's "What Is Love". Mike Bell of the Calgary Herald referred to it as a "jaw-droppingly gorgeous cover". Kiesza's second single, "Giant in My Heart", premiered on Annie Mac's BBC Radio 1 show on June 13, 2014. It entered the UK Singles Chart at number four, with 33,414 copies sold in its first week. Her first studio album, Sound of a Woman, was released on October 13, 2014, and included "Hideway" and "Giant in my Heart".

Kiesza collaborated with Skrillex and Diplo (working together under the name Jack Ü) on the song "Take Ü There", which was released as the first single from the producers' collaborative 2015 mixtape, Skrillex and Diplo Present Jack Ü. The song premiered at Diplo's Mad Decent Block Party on August 9, 2014. She co-wrote Gorgon City's "Go All Night", featuring Jennifer Hudson singing her lyrics, which was on the British duo's debut album, Sirens. Kiesza appeared as a guest on Duran Duran's album Paper Gods, on the song "Last Night in the City", released in September 2015, with a music video published a year later. She wrote several songs for Rihanna, which were considered for the Barbadian artist's eighth studio album, Anti. She also worked with Loreen on the 2015 single "I'm in It with You".

=== 2017–present: Hiatus, Crave, Dancing and Crying ===
Kiesza released the single "Dearly Beloved" on January 6, 2017. An accompanying music video was posted on YouTube the same day through the KieszaVevo channel. According to Kiesza, the song and her future material were inspired by her best friend Alicia Lemke, who had died in November 2015 from leukemia. On March 17, 2017, Pitbull released the album Climate Change, featuring a collaboration with Kiesza titled "We Are Strong". At the same time, Cerrone issued the album RedLips, which included a collaboration with Kiesza titled "Ain't No Party". On June 2, 2017, she was featured in "Don't Want You Back" by Bakermat,

Kiesza was involved in a car accident in 2017 in Toronto, when an Uber vehicle she was in was struck by a taxi in a side collision. Part of her recovery, from what she described as a traumatic brain injury, required her staying in a darkened room for six months. After a two-year hiatus, Kiesza released a new single, "Sweet Love", and returned to touring in June 2019. Paper magazine referred to the new song as being a "blurring of genres unlike her other dance-pop anthems" and also reported that Kiesza was working on a musical. In 2020, she released her second studio album, Crave. In 2022, she was featured in the song "Money in the Bag" from the Lights album Pep. In May 2024, Kiesza released a new EP, titled Dancing and Crying: Vol. 1, which received praise from critics. It yielded her first US number one on Billboard's Dance/Mix Show Airplay chart, "I Go Dance". She issued its follow-up, Dancing and Crying: Vol. 2, in July 2025. In 2025, Kiesza toured the United States, Mexico, and Canada.

== Other ventures ==
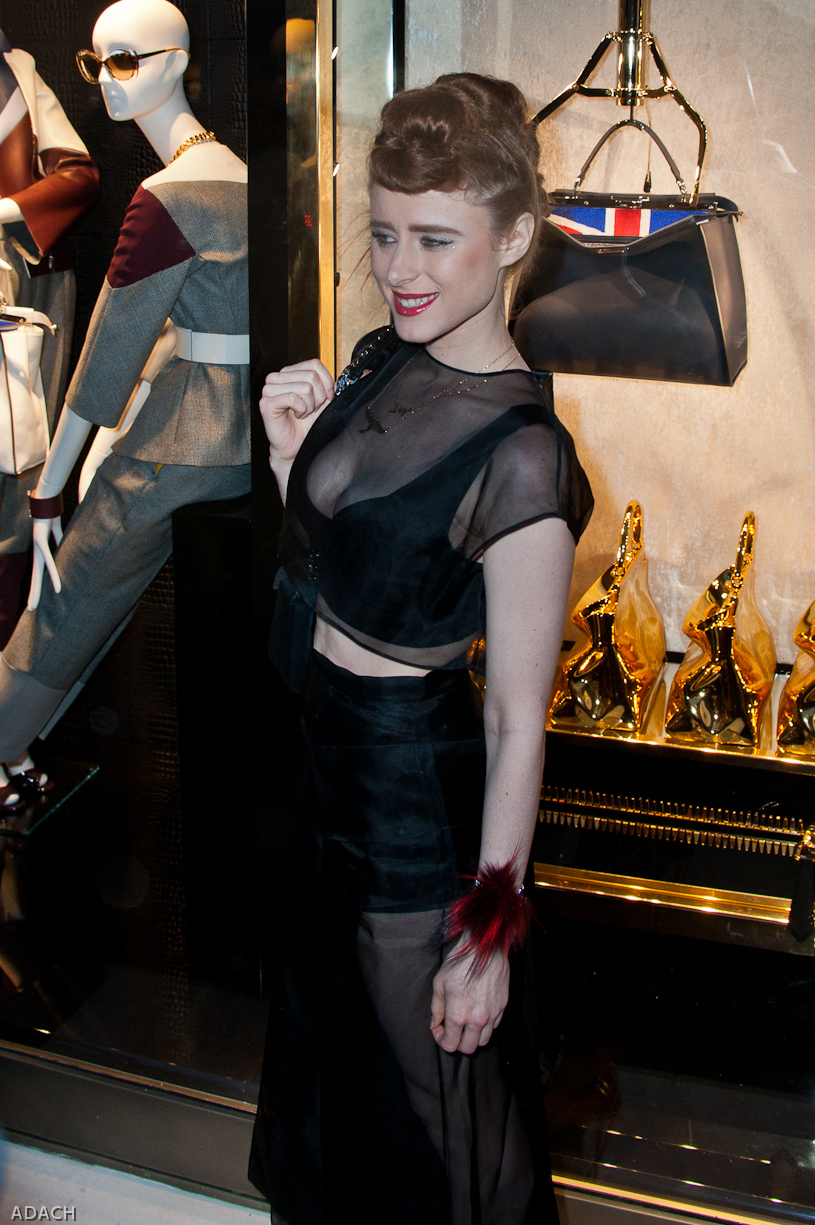
Kiesza in 2014

In 2014, Kiesza was selected to be the face of a new line of fashion eyewear called Color Block by retailer Fendi, appearing in a promotional video shot by Ruth Hogben. It featured Kiesza "strolling on a treadmill against a painted skyline, while singing and donning the double-framed, colourful sunglasses". She announced plans to release her own line of fashion under the name SteamPop sometime in 2014. In May 2014, she was a guest star at the party organized by Safilo and Fendi at the closing of the 2014 Cannes Film Festival to celebrate the New Color Black Eyewear collection. In September 2014, she reiterated she wanted "to put my own fashions out and just sort of make my own fashion ideas accessible to my audience. That's the idea behind Steampop."

In August 2015, Kiesza designed the latest Bad Bunch NYC latest clothing line, titled Select Surrealism. She mentioned blending Old Hollywood style with punk rock elements, as she loved "really eccentric people", citing Alice Cooper and Freddie Mercury, as well as "those with simple glamour" like Audrey Hepburn and Lucille Ball.

== Discography ==
- Sound of a Woman (2014)
- Crave (2020)

== Tours ==
Headlining

- Sound of a Woman Tour (2015)
- Dancing and Crying Tour (2025)

Opening act

- Demi Lovato – Demi World Tour (2014)
- Lindsey Stirling – The Artemis Tour (2021)

== Awards and nominations ==
Year	Awards	Category	Work	Outcome
2014	UK Music Video Awards	Best Pop Video – International	"Hideaway"	Nominated
2014	MTV Europe Music Awards	Best Video	"Hideaway"	Nominated
2014	MTV Europe Music Awards	Best New Act	Herself	Nominated
2014	MTV Europe Music Awards	Best Push Act	Herself	Nominated
2014	MTV Europe Music Awards	Best Canadian Act	Herself	Nominated
2014	BBC Music Awards	Song of the Year	"Hideaway"	Nominated
2014	MTV Video Music Awards	Best Choreography	"Hideaway"	Nominated
2015	ECHO Awards	Female Artist Rock / Pop internationally	Sound of a Woman	Nominated
2015	ECHO Awards	Newcomer international	Sound of a Woman	Nominated
2015	Juno Awards	Single of the Year	"Hideaway"	Nominated
2015	Juno Awards	Video of the Year	"Hideaway"	Won
2015	Juno Awards	Breakthrough Artist of the Year	Herself	Won
2015	Juno Awards	Dance Recording of the Year	Sound of a Woman	Won
2015	YouTube Music Awards	50 Greatest Artists and YouTube Performances	Herself	Won
2015	MTVU Woodie Awards	Cover Woodie	Herself	Nominated
2015	MTVU Woodie Awards	Co-Sign Woodie	"Take Ü There": Jack Ü feat. Kiesza	Nominated
2015	Canadian Radio Music Awards	Best New Group or Solo Artist: CHR	"Hideaway"	Won
2015	Canadian Radio Music Awards	Best New Group or Solo Artist: AC	"Hideaway"	Nominated
2015	Western Canadian Music Awards	Electronic/Dance Recording of the Year	"Hideaway"	Won
2015	International Dance Music Awards	Best House/Garage/Deep House Track	"Hideaway"	Won
2015	International Dance Music Awards	Best Music Video	"Hideaway"	Nominated
2015	International Dance Music Awards	Best Rap/Hip-Hop/Trap Dance Track	"Take Ü There": Jack Ü feat. Kiesza	Nominated
2015	International Dance Music Awards	Best Breakthrough Artist (Solo)	Herself	Nominated
2015	Much Music Video Awards	Video of the Year	"Giant in My Heart"	Nominated
2015	Much Music Video Awards	Best EDM/Dance	"Giant in My Heart"	Nominated
2015	Much Music Video Awards	Most Buzzworthy Canadian	Sound of a Woman	Nominated
2025	Electronic Dance Music Awards	Dance/Electro Pop Song of the Year	"I Go Dance"	Nominated
