= New Zealand top 50 singles of 2015 =

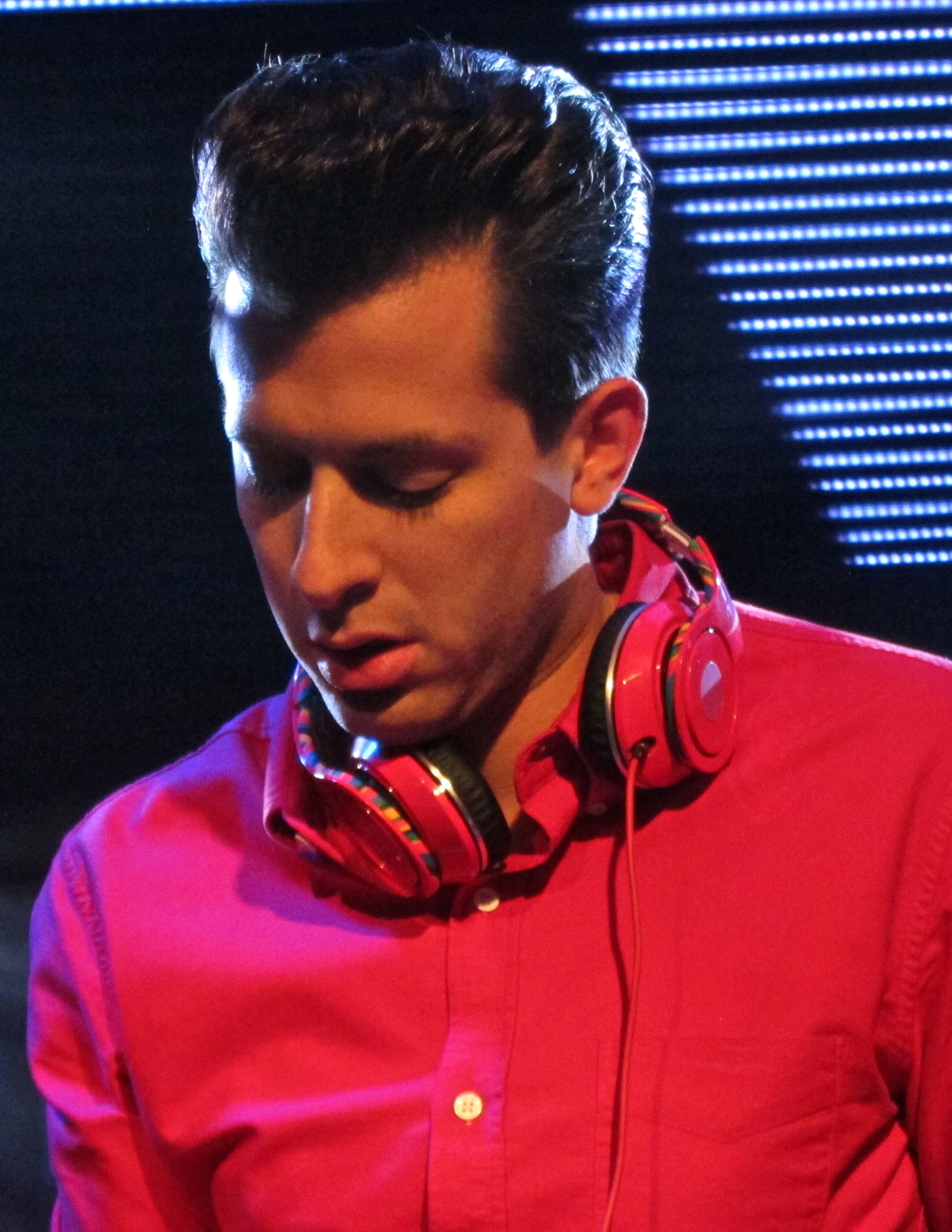
British DJ Mark Ronson released the top single of 2015

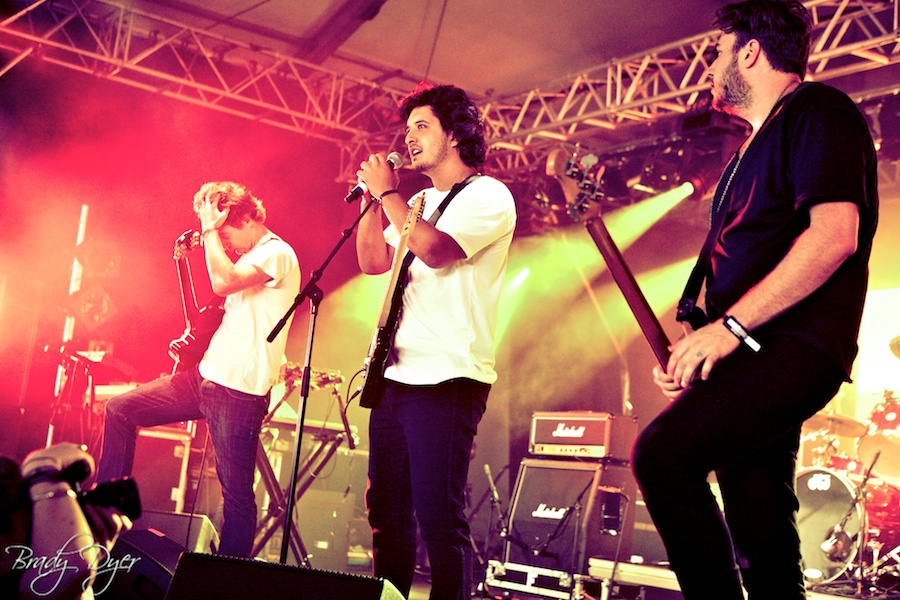
Six60 released 8 of the top 20 best performing songs by New Zealand artists in 2015, including the top New Zealand artist song of the year, "White Lines"

This is a list of the top-selling singles in New Zealand for 2015 from the Official New Zealand Music Chart's end-of-year chart, compiled by Recorded Music NZ. English singer-songwriter Ed Sheeran, English soul singer Sam Smith, Canadian R&B singer The Weeknd and New Zealand band Six60 each had three songs in the chart. The chart was topped by Mark Ronson featuring Bruno Mars' song "Uptown Funk". As well as the three songs by Six60, the chart also had songs by New Zealand artists Avalanche City and Savage.

== Chart ==
Key
† – Song of New Zealand origin (Note: Whether or not a song is of New Zealand origin is determined by the RIANZ)

Rank	Artist	Song
1	Mark Ronson featuring Bruno Mars	"Uptown Funk"
2	Major Lazer featuring MØ and DJ Snake	"Lean On"
3	Wiz Khalifa featuring Charlie Puth	"See You Again"
4	Hozier	"Take Me to Church"
5	OMI	"Cheerleader"
6	Maroon 5	"Sugar"
7	Ed Sheeran	"Thinking Out Loud"
8	Rihanna, Kanye West and Paul McCartney	"FourFiveSeconds"
9	Jack Ü with Justin Bieber	"Where Are Ü Now"
10	The Weeknd	"Can't Feel My Face"
11	Justin Bieber	"What Do You Mean?"
12	Ellie Goulding	"Love Me like You Do"
13	Adele	"Hello"
14	Justin Bieber	"Sorry"
15	Jason Derulo	"Want to Want Me"
16	Meghan Trainor featuring John Legend	"Like I'm Gonna Lose You"
17	Charlie Puth featuring Meghan Trainor	"Marvin Gaye"
18	The Weeknd	"The Hills"
19	Walk the Moon	"Shut Up & Dance"
20	Timmy Trumpet and Savage	"Freaks"†
21	Sam Smith	"Lay Me Down"
22	Six60	"White Lines"†
23	The Weeknd	"Earned It"
24	James Bay	"Hold Back the River"
25	Kygo featuring Parson James	"Stole the Show"
26	Ed Sheeran	"Photograph"
27	Calvin Harris and Disciples	"How Deep Is Your Love?"
28	Six60	"Special"†
29	Galantis	"Runaway (U & I)"
30	Pitbull and Ne-Yo	"Time of Our Lives"
31	Sam Smith	"Stay with Me"
32	James Bay	"Let It Go"
33	Ed Sheeran and Rudimental	"Bloodstream"
34	David Guetta featuring Nicki Minaj, Bebe Rexha & Afrojack	"Hey Mama"
35	Deorro and Chris Brown	"Five More Hours"
36	Nick Jonas	"Jealous"
37	Fetty Wap	"Trap Queen"
38	Macklemore & Ryan Lewis featuring Eric Nally, Melle Mel, Kool Moe Dee & Grandmaster Caz	"Downtown"
39	Avalanche City	"Inside Out"†
40	Sam Smith	"I'm Not the Only One"
41	Avicii	"The Nights"
42	Rachel Platten	"Fight Song"
43	Grace featuring G-Eazy	"You Don't Own Me"
44	R. City featuring Adam Levine	"Locked Away"
45	Six60	"So High"†
46	Robin Schulz featuring Francesco Yates	"Sugar"
47	Flo Rida featuring Robin Thicke and Verdine White	"I Don't Like It, I Love It"
48	Silentó	"Watch Me (Whip/Nae Nae)"
49	Olly Murs featuring Demi Lovato	"Up"
50	AronChupa	"I'm an Albatraoz"

== Top 20 singles of 2015 by New Zealand artists ==
Key
– Songs that appeared in the Top 50 Chart

Rank	Artist	Song
1	Six60	"White Lines"
2	Timmy Trumpet and Savage	"Freaks"
3	Six60	"Special"
4	Avalanche City	"Inside Out"
5	Six60	"So High"
6	Disclosure featuring Lorde	"Magnets"
7	Six60	"Purple"
8	Lorde	"Yellow Flicker Beat"
9	Ginny Blackmore	"Love Me Anyway"
10	Beau Monga	"King and Queen"
11	Six60	"Don't Forget Your Roots"
12	Lorde	"Royals"
13	Six60	"Only To Be"
14	Broods	"Bridges"
15	Broods	"Four Walls"
16	Broods	"Mother & Father"
17	Gin Wigmore	"New Rush"
18	Six60	"Forever"
19	Six60	"Exhale"
20	Lorde	"Team"

Notes
- Although "Freaks" is by Australia musician, Timmy Trumpet and "Magnets" is by British band, Disclosure, both songs have been included as the songs featured New Zealand musicians, Savage and Lorde respectively.

== Chart by numbers ==
=== Origin ===
==== By artist ====
The following shows the country of origin from where the artist (including any featured artist where applicable) originate from. Artists who appear more than once have only been tallied once.

Country	Total
United States	35
England	12
Sweden	5
Canada	3
New Zealand	3
Australia	2
France	2
Jamaica	2
Albania	1
Barbados	1
Denmark	1
Germany	1
Ireland	1
Mexico	1
Norway	1
Scotland	1
Netherlands	1
Trinidad and Tobago	1

Notes
- As Nicki Minaj was born in Trinidad and Tobago and raised in the United States, both countries have been included in her tally.
- As Bebe Rexha was born in Albania and raised in the United States, both countries have been included in her tally.
- As Deorro was born in Mexico and raised in the United States, both countries have been included in his tally.
- Major Lazer is regarded as an English/Jamaican group and as such both countries have been included in their tally.

==== By single ====
The following shows the country of origin from which the singles originate regardless of who the artist is.

Country	Total
United States	17
England	16
Canada	5
New Zealand	5
Sweden	3
Australia	2
Jamaica	2
Barbados	1
France	1
Germany	1
Ireland	1
Mexico	1
Norway	1
Scotland	1

Notes
- Major Lazer's single has been listed as being from the United States, England and Jamaica.
- "FourFiveSeconds" has been listed under all three countries each singer is from as this was song was a collaboration between Kanye West, Rihanna and Sir Paul McCartney.
- As "Freaks" was collaboration between Timmy Trumpet and Savage, both New Zealand & Australia, have been included in the tally.
- As Deorro was born in Mexico and raised in the United States, both countries have been included in his tally.
- As Macklemore & Ryan Lewis are a duo, the United States has been included twice in the tally for each artist respectively.
- As the song, "How Deep Is Your Love" is a collaboration between Calvin Harris & Disciples, both Scotland and England have been included in the tally.

=== Most singles ===
The following shows the artists who have the most singles that appear in this chart. This includes where an artist appeared as a featured artist; however where a singer (e.g. Adam Levine) appears as a featured artist on their own and who is usually part of a band/group, this does not count towards their groups (e.g. Maroon 5) tally.

Artist	Total
Sam Smith	3
Six60	3
Justin Bieber	3
Ed Sheeran	3
The Weeknd	2
Meghan Trainor	2
James Bay	2
Charlie Puth	2

Notes
- Both Charlie Puth & Meghan Trainor's tallies include a single where they were a featured artist. Puth featured in "See You Again" with Wiz Khalifa while Trainor featured in Puth's song, "Marvin Gaye".

=== Format ===
The following show what format each single appears on, whether it was an artists album, a non-album single, an extended play or as part of a soundtrack.

Format	Total
Albums	34
Singles	7
EP	6
Soundtracks	2

Notes
- The song, "See You Again" by Wiz Khalifa which features Charlie Puth, appears on Puth's album, Nine Track Mind and the soundtrack to Furious 7.
- The song, "Take Me to Church" appears on the album Hozier and the extended play Take Me to Church, both by Hozier.
- The song, "Love Me Like You Do" appears on the soundtrack to Fifty Shades of Grey and Ellie Goulding's album, Delirium.
- The song, "Earned It" appears on the soundtrack to Fifty Shades of Grey and The Weeknd's album, Beauty Behind The Madness.
- The song, "Marvin Gaye" appears on the album, Nine Track Mind and the extended play, Some Type Of Love, both by Charlie Puth.
- The song, "Fight Song" appears on the album, Wildfire and the extended play, Fight Song, both by Rachel Platten.
- The song "Where Are Ü Now" appears on both the Jack Ü album, Skrillex and Diplo Present Jack Ü and Justin Bieber's album, Purpose.
- The song "Lay Me Down" appears on the extended play Nirvana and the album In The Lonely Hour, both by Sam Smith.
- The song "Time of Our Lives" appears on both Pitbull's Globalization and Ne-Yo's Non-Fiction albums.
- The Ed Sheeran only version of the song "Bloodstream" appears on his album, x.
- The song The Nights appears on the extended play The Days/Nights and the album Stories both by Avicii.

=== Multiple releases ===
The following shows singles that had multiple releases from the same album.

Title	Total	Singles
Beauty Behind The Madness; The Weeknd	3	"Can't Feel My Face" "Earned It" "The Hills"
In The Lonely Hour; Sam Smith	3	"I'm Not The Only One" "Lay Me Down" "Stay With Me"
Purpose; Justin Bieber	3	"Sorry" "What Do You Mean" "Where Are Ü Now"
Six60 (2); Six60	3	"So High" "Special" "White Lines"
Chaos & The Calm; James Bay	2	"Hold Back The River" "Let It Go"
Fifty Shades Of Grey soundtrack	2	"Earned It" by The Weeknd "Love Me Like You Do" by Ellie Goulding
Nine Track Mind; Charlie Puth	2	"Marvin Gaye" "See You Again"
x Ed Sheeran	2	"Photograph" "Thinking Out Loud"

=== Type ===
The following shows the denomination that each single was released as, whether as a solo artist or as part of a group, band or duo. Also shows how many singles had guest artists.

Type	Total
Solo artists	33
Groups	9
Featured artists	16
Collaboration	7

Notes
- Macklemore & Ryan Lewis have been regarded as a group.
- Although uncredited in "The Nights", Nicholas Furlong has been included as a featured artist.
- Although uncredited in the song, "I'm An Albatraoz", Nora Ekberg has been included in the tally for featured artist.
- Although uncredited in the song, "Runaway (U & I)", both Cathy Dennis and Julia Karlsson have been included as a featured artist.

=== Top Genre ===
The following shows the most common genres the Top 50 singles are regarded as (as per their genre descriptions in the singles entries. Where a genre was not noted, the genre of the album/extended play was used instead.

Genre	Total	Singles
R&B	10	"Earned It" by The Weeknd "I'm Not the Only One" by Sam Smith "Jealous" by Nick Jonas "Lay Me Down" by Sam Smith "Marvin Gaye" by Charlie Puth featuring Meghan Trainor "So High" by Six60 "Special" by Six60 "Trap Queen" by Fetty Wap "White Lines" by Six60 "You Don't Own Me" by Grace featuring G-Eazy
Pop	9	"Can't Feel My Face" by The Weeknd "FourFiveSeconds" by Kanye West, Rihanna & Paul McCartney "I'm Not the Only One" by Sam Smith "Jealous" by Nick Jonas "Marvin Gaye" by Charlie Puth featuring Meghan Trainor "Photograph" by Ed Sheeran "Sorry" by Justin Bieber "Want to Want Me" by Jason Derulo "What Do You Mean" by Justin Bieber
Soul	9	"Hello" by Adele "I'm Not the Only One" by Sam Smith "Lay Me Down" by Sam Smith "Let It Go" by James Bay "Like I'm Gonna Lose You" by Meghan Trainor featuring John Legend "Stay with Me" by Sam Smith "Maroon 5" by Maroon 5 "Take Me to Church" by Hozier "Uptown Funk" by Mark Ronson featuring Bruno Mars
Electro house	4	"Five More Hours" by Deorro featuring Chris Brown "Freaks" by Timmy Trumpet & Savage "Hey Mama" by David Guetta featuring Afrojack, Bebe Rexha & Nicki Minaj "I'm an Albatraoz" by AronChupa featuring Nora Ekberg
Hip hop	4	"Downtown" by Macklemore & Ryan Lewis featuring Eric Nally, Grandmaster Caz, Kool Moe Dee & Melle Mel "See You Again" by Wiz Khalifa featuring Charlie Puth "Trap Queen" by Fetty Wap "You Don't Own Me" by Grace featuring G-Eazy
Alternative rock	3	"So High" by Six60 "Special" by Six60 "White Lines" by Six60
Disco	3	"Sugar" by Maroon 5 "Want to Want Me" by Jason Derulo "Can't Feel My Face" by The Weeknd
Electronica	3	"So High" by Six60 "Special" by Six60 "White Lines" by Six60
Tropical house	3	"Sorry" by Justin Bieber "Stole the Show" by Kygo featuring Parson James "What Do You Mean" by Justin Bieber
Dance	2	"Lean On" by Major Lazer featuring DJ Snake & MØ "Sugar" by Robin Schulz featuring Francesco Yates
Dancehall	2	"Locked Away" by R. City featuring Adam Levine "Sorry" by Justin Bieber
Deep house	2	"How Deep Is Your Love" by Calvin Harris & Disciples "Sugar" by Robin Schulz featuring Francesco Yates
Funk	2	"Can't Feel My Face" by The Weeknd "Uptown Funk" by Mark Ronson featuring Bruno Mars
Funk pop	2	"Downtown" by Macklemore & Ryan Lewis featuring Eric Nally, Grandmaster Caz, Kool Moe Dee & Melle Mel "Sugar" by Maroon 5
Indie rock	2	"Hold Back the River" by James Bay "Take Me to Church" by Hozier
Pop-rap	2	"See You Again" by Wiz Khalifa featuring Charlie Puth "Watch Me (Whip/Nae Nae)" by Silentó
Progressive house	2	"Runaway (U & I)" by Galantis featuring Cathy Dennis & Julia Karlsson "The Nights" by Avicii featuring Nicholas Furlong
Reggae fusion	2	"Cheerleader" by Omi "Locked Away" by R. City featuring Adam Levine
Soft rock	2	"Let It Go" by James Bay "Thinking Out Loud" by Ed Sheeran
Trap	2	"Hey Mama" by David Guetta featuring Afrojack, Bebe Rexha & Nicki Minaj "Trap Queen" by Fetty Wap

=== Top Label ===
The following shows the most common record labels that a single was associated with. Any label that only had one single has not been noted.

Label	Total	Singles
Atlantic Records	8	"Bloodsctream" by Ed Sheeran & Rudimental "Hey Mama" by David Guetta featuring Afrojack, Bebe Rexha & Nicki Minaj "I Don't Like It, I Love It" by Flo Rida featuring Robin Thicke & Verdine White "Marvin Gaye" by Charlie Puth featuring Meghan Trainor "Photograph" by Ed Sheeran "See You Again" by Wiz Khalifa featuring Charlie Puth "Thinking Out Loud" by Ed Sheeran "Where Are Ü Now" by Jack Ü & Justin Bieber
Republic Records	7	"Can't Feel My Face" by The Weeknd "Earned It" by The Weeknd "Hold Back the River" by James Bay "Jealous" by Nick Jonas "Let It Go" by James Bay "Love Me Like You Do" by Ellie Goulding "The Hills" by The Weeknd
Capitol Records	4	"I'm Not the Only One" by Sam Smith "Lay Me Down" by Sam Smith "Stay with Me" by Sam Smith "Watch Me (Whip/Nae Nae)" by Silentó
Columbia Records	4	"Cheerleader" by Omi "Fight Song" by Rachel Platten "How Deep Is Your Love" by Calvin Harris featuring Disciples "Take Me to Church" by Hozier
RCA Records	4	"Locked Away" by R. City featuring Adam Levine "Time of Our Lives" by Pitbull featuring Ne-Yo "Uptown Funk" by Mark Ronson featuring Bruno Mars "You Don't Own Me" by Grace featuring G-Eazy
Warner Music Group	4	"Inside Out" by Avalanche City "Lean On" by Major Lazer featuring DJ Snake & MØ "Runaway (U & I)" by Galantis featuring Cathy Dennis & Julia Karlsson "Sugar" by Robin Schulz featuring Francesco Yates
Asylum Records	3	"Bloodstream" by Ed Sheeran & Rudimental "Photograph" by Ed Sheeran "Thinking Out Loud" by Ed Sheeran
Massive Entertainment	3	"So High" by Six60 "Special" by Six60 "White Lines" by Six60
Def Jam Recordings	2	"Sorry" by Justin Bieber "What Do You Mean" by Justin Bieber
Epic Records	2	"Like I'm Gonna Lose You" by Meghan Trainor featuring John Legend "Up" by Olly Murs featuring Demi Lovato
Interscope Records	2	"Love Me Like You Do" by Ellie Goulding "Sugar" by Maroon 5
Island Records	2	"Jealous" by Nick Jonas "Take Me to Church" by Hozier
Mad Decent	2	"Lean On" by Major Lazer featuring DJ Snake & MØ "Where Are Ü Now" by Jack Ü & Justin Bieber
PRMD Music	2	"Five More Hours" by Deorro featuring Chris Brown "The Nights" by Avicii featuring Nicholas Furlong
Sony Music Entertainment	2	"I'm an Albatraoz" by AronChupa featuring Nora Ekberg "Stole the Show" by Kygo featuring Parson James
Ultra Records	2	"Cheerleader" by Omi "Five More Hours" by Deorro featuring Chris Brown
Universal Music Group	2	"Freaks" by Timmy Trumpet & Savage "The Nights" by Avicii featuring Nicholas Furlong
XO Records	2	"Can't Feel My Face" by The Weeknd "The Hills" by The Weeknd

=== Top songwriters ===
The following shows the songwriters who had the most top-selling singles of 2015 in New Zealand.

Songwriter	Total	Single/s
Abel Tesfaye	3	"Can't Feel My Face" by The Weeknd "Earned It" by The Weeknd "The Hills" by The Weeknd
Chris Mac	3	"So High" by Six60 "Special" by Six60 "White Lines" by Six60
Ed Sheeran	3	"Bloodstream" by Ed Sheeran & Rudimental "Photograph" by Ed Sheeran "Thinking Out Loud" by Ed Sheeran
Eli Paewai	3	"So High" by Six60 "Special" by Six60 "White Lines" by Six60
Henry Walter	3	"Locked Away" by R. City featuring Adam Levine "Sugar" by Maroon 5 "Time of Our Lives" by Pitbull) featuring Ne-Yo
James Napier	3	"I'm Not the Only One" by Sam Smith "Lay Me Down" by Sam Smith "Stay with Me" by Sam Smith
Ji Fraser	3	"So High" by Six60 "Special" by Six60 "White Lines" by Six60
Justin Bieber	3	"Sorry" by Justin Bieber "What Do You Mean" by Justin Bieber "Where Are Ü Now" by Jack Ü & Justin Bieber
Lukasz Gottwald	3	"Locked Away" by R. City featuring Adam Levine "Sugar" by Maroon 5 "Time of Our Lives" by Pitbull featuring Ne-Yo
Marlon Gerbes	3	"So High" by Six60 "Special" by Six60 "White Lines" by Six60
Matiu Walters	3	"So High" by Six60 "Special" by Six60 "White Lines" by Six60
Sam Smith	3	"I'm Not the Only One" by Sam Smith "Lay Me Down" by Sam Smith "Stay with Me" by Sam Smith
Ahmad Balshe	2	"Earned It" by The Weeknd "The Hills" by The Weeknd
Ali Payami	2	"Can't Feel My Face" by The Weeknd "Love Me Like You Do" by Ellie Goulding
Charlie Puth	2	"Marvin Gaye" by Charlie Puth featuring Meghan Trainor "See You Again" by Wiz Khalifa featuring Charlie Puth
James Bay	2	"Hold Back the River" by James Bay "Let It Go" by James Bay
Jason "Poo Bear" Boyd	2	"What Do You Mean" by Justin Bieber "Where Are Ü Now" by Jack Ü & Justin Bieber
Johnny McDaid	2	"Bloodstreanm" by Ed Sheeran & Rudimental "Photograph" by Ed Sheeran
Max Martin	2	"Can't Feel My Face" by The Weeknd "Love Me Like You Do" by Ellie Goulding
Savan Kotecha	2	"Can't Feel My Face" by The Weeknd "Love Me Like You Do" by Ellie Goulding
Sonny Moore	2	"Sorry" by Justin Bieber "Where Are Ü Now" by Jack Ü & Justin Bieber

=== Most/Least songwriters ===
The following shows the singles that were credited as having been written by only one person and the singles that had the most credited writers of 2015.

Single	Total	Songwriter/s
"Five More Hours"; Deorro & Chris Brown	1	Erick Orrosquieta
"I'm An Albatraoz"; AronChupa featuring Nora Ekberg	1	Aron Ekberg
"Inside Out"; Avalanche City	1	Dave Baxter
"Take Me to Church"; Hozier	1	Andrew Hozier-Byrne
"Trap Queen"; Fetty Wap	1	Willie Maxwell
"Downtown"; Macklemore & Ryan Lewis featuring Eric Nally, Grandmaster Caz, Kool Moe Dee & Melle Mel	9	Ben Haggerty; Darian Asplund; Eric Nally; Evan Flory-Barnes; Jacob Dutton; Joshua Karp; Joshua Rawlings; Ryan Lewis; Tim Haggerty
"FourFiveSeconds" by Kanye West, Rihanna & Sir Paul McCartney	9	Dallas Austin; David Longstreth; Elon Rutberg; Kanye West; Kirby Lauryen; Mike Dean; Noah Goldstein; Paul McCartney; Tyrone Griffin
"Uptown Funk"; Mark Ronson featuring Bruno Mars	19	Alvin Jones; Bruno Mars; Carl Scoggins; Charlie Wilson; Chris Clayton; Devon Gallaspy; James "Jimi" Macon; Jeff Bhasker; Lonnie Simmons; Mark Ronson; Nicholas Williams; O'Dell Stokes; Philip Lawrence; Robert Wilson; Ronnie Wilson; Roscoe Smith; Rudolph Taylor; Tim Fenderson; Tommy Lokey

Notes
- While 19 songwriters have been listed for "Uptown Funk", most of the mentioned are members of The Gap Band. On the single itself, only 9 songwriters are listed. The Gap Band members have been listed as the band and not individually as shown above.

=== Top producers ===
The following shows the producers who had the most singles to appear on this chart.

Producer	Total	Single
Chris Mac	3	"So High" by Six60 "Special" by Six60 "White Lines" by Six60
Eli Paewai	3	"So High" by Six60 "Special" by Six60 "White Lines" by Six60
Henry Walter	3	"Locked Away" by R. City featuring Adam Levine "Sugar" by Maroon 5 "Time of Our Lives" by Pitbull featuring Ne-Yo
James Napier	3	"I'm Not the Only One" by Sam Smith "Lay Me Down" by Sam Smith "Stay with Me" by Sam Smith
Ji Fraser	3	"So High" by Six60 "Special" by Six60 "White Lines" by Six60
Marlon Gerbes	3	"So High" by Six60 "Special" by Six60 "White Lines" by Six60
Matiu Walters	3	"So High" by Six60 "Special" by Six60 "White Lines" by Six60
Steve Fitzmaurice	3	"I'm Not the Only One" by Sam Smith "Lay Me Down" by Sam Smith "Stay with Me" by Sam Smith
Tiki Taane	3	"So High" by Six60 "Special" by Six60 "White Lines" by Six60
Ali Payami	2	"Can't Feel My Face" by The Weeknd "Love Me Like You Do" by Ellie Goulding
Charlie Puth	2	"Marvin Gaye" by Charlie Puth featuring Meghan Trainor "See You Again" by Wiz Khalifa featuring Charlie Puth
Jacquire King	2	"Hold Back the River" by James Bay "Let It Go" by James Bay
Jeff Bhasker	2	"Photograph" by Ed Sheeran "Uptown Funk" by Mark Ronson featuring Bruno Mars
Lukasz Gottwald	2	"Locked Away" by R. City featuring Adam Levine "Time of Our Lives" by Pitbull featuring Ne-Yo
Max Martin	2	"Can't Feel My Face" by The Weeknd "Love Me Like You Do" by Ellie Goulding
Sonny Moore	2	"Sorry" by Justin Bieber "Where Are Ü Now" by Jack Ü featuring Justin Bieber
Thomas Wesley Pentz	2	"Lean On" by Major Lazer featuring DJ Snake & MØ "Where Are Ü Now" by Jack Ü featuring Justin Bieber
