= To Ü =

- Cover for the remixes EP

Single by Jack Ü featuring AlunaGeorge

from the album Skrillex and Diplo Present Jack Ü
- Released: October 23, 2015
- Genre: EDM
- Length: 3:57
- Label: Owsla; Mad Decent; Atlantic
- Songwriters: Sonny Moore; Thomas Pentz; Aluna Francis; George Reid
- Producers: Skrillex; Diplo

Jack Ü singles chronology
| "Where Are Ü Now" (2015) | "To Ü" (2015) |

Music video
- "To Ü" on YouTube

"To Ü" is a song by the American EDM duo Jack Ü, composed of DJs and producers Skrillex and Diplo, featuring the English electronic music duo AlunaGeorge. The song was released as the third single from the duo's debut studio album, Skrillex and Diplo Present Jack Ü (2015), on their respective labels Owsla and Mad Decent.

A remix EP was released on October 23, 2015, with remixes from George, Armand van Helden, Oliver, and Clean Bandit.

== Critical reception ==
Khal of Complex called the song "one of the album's standouts". Michael Cragg of The Guardian called the song "relatively delicate".

Kat Bein of Billboard ranked the song at number five on their list of Skrillex's best songs, writing, "This album cut, quite like love, comes on sweet and hits you where it hurts". Edward Tomlin of Singersroom.com ranked the song at number five on their list of Diplo's best songs, calling it "an upbeat and energetic dance track, with AlunaGeorge's silky vocals complementing the song's pulsing beats and synth-heavy production".

== Music video ==
The music video for the song, directed by AG Rojas, was released in October 2015. Set in Detroit, the video features visuals of real-life couples and the "distinct look of modern day Detroit".

== Live performances ==
Jack Ü performed the song live at Ultra Japan 2015.

== Track listing ==
Remixes EP
| No. | Title | Length |
|---|---|---|
| 1. | "To Ü" (George Remix) | 4:10 |
| 2. | "To Ü" (Armand van Helden Hype Remix) | 5:55 |
| 3. | "To Ü" (Oliver Remix) | 3:51 |
| 4. | "To Ü" (Clean Bandit Remix) | 3:42 |
| Total length: | | 17:40 |

== Charts ==
Chart performance for "To Ü"
| Chart (2015) | Peak position |
|---|---|
| Australia (ARIA) | 83 |
| US Dance/Mix Show Airplay (Billboard) | 18 |
| US Hot Dance/Electronic Songs (Billboard) | 28 |

== Certifications ==
Certifications for "To Ü"
| Region | Certification | Certified units/sales |
|---|---|---|
| Australia (ARIA) | Gold | 35,000^{‡} |
| New Zealand (RMNZ) | Gold | 15,000^{‡} |
| United States (RIAA) | Gold | 500,000^{‡} |
^{‡} Sales+streaming figures based on certification alone.
