= Where Are Ü Now =

Single by Jack Ü with Justin Bieber

from the album Skrillex and Diplo Present Jack Ü and Purpose
- Released: February 27, 2015
- Recorded: September 9, 2014
- Genre: EDM; futurepop; tropical house
- Length: 4:10
- Label: Owsla; Mad Decent; Atlantic
- Songwriters: Sonny Moore; Thomas Wesley Pentz; Justin Bieber; Jason "Poo Bear" Boyd; Karl Rubin Brutus; Jordan Ware
- Producers: Skrillex; Diplo

Jack Ü singles chronology
"Take Ü There" (2014)	"Where Are Ü Now" (2015)	"To Ü" (2015)

Justin Bieber singles chronology
"Home to Mama" (2014)	"Where Are Ü Now" (2015)	"What Do You Mean?" (2015)

Music video
- "Where Are Ü Now" on YouTube

"Where Are Ü Now" is a song produced by American EDM duo Jack Ü, composed of DJs and producers Skrillex and Diplo, with Canadian singer Justin Bieber. The song was released as the second single from the duo's debut studio album, Skrillex and Diplo Present Jack Ü (2015), on their respective labels Owsla and Mad Decent, and is later included on Bieber's fourth studio album, Purpose (2015). It was released simultaneously with the album on February 27, 2015, later sent to mainstream radio on April 21, 2015.

Initially, the track started as a piano ballad demo written by Bieber titled "The Most"; however, Bieber decided to send the track to the duo, who transformed the track into electronic dance music, but maintained its original lyrics. The song main's instrumentation consists of sharp dancehall stabs and an Eastern melody. Lyrically, "Where Are Ü Now" talks about caring and praying for an ex who didn't return the favor, and longing for someone who could comfort him in his time of need.

Widely considered by critics to be the beginning of a period of broader mainstream critical recognition and acceptance for Bieber, the song was featured on several year-end list of best songs of 2015, being at the top of two publications. It also won a Grammy Award for Best Dance Recording. Commercially, the song peaked at number eight on the Billboard Hot 100, giving both Skrillex and Diplo their first top 10 single on the chart, also giving Bieber his sixth. Internationally, the song has peaked within the top-ten of the charts in eight countries, including Australia, Canada, and the United Kingdom.

== Background and recording ==
While writing with Poo Bear for his upcoming album at the time, Justin Bieber heard a demo of an instrumental piano ballad Boyd did with Karl Rubin and enjoyed it, calling it "special". Later, he and Boyd, "bounced words and melodies back and forth over an instrumental track; when they had the lyrics, Bieber sang take after take so Poo Bear could edit together the best reading of every line and every syllable." The song was recorded as a piano ballad and it took an hour and a half to be recorded. According to Bieber, "he didn't want it to be raw, he wanted it to be perfect." Later, in September 2014, during Fashion Week and at an Alexander Wang event, Skrillex and Diplo contacted Bieber's manager Scooter Braun claiming that they were looking for vocal tracks for the debut album by their dance duo Jack Ü and asked him if Bieber had new material. Braun responded positively, claiming that he had an amazing vocal from Bieber with only piano and sent it to Diplo, without Bieber's consent. They decided to collaborate with Bieber as it would be unexpected.

As The New York Times writer Jon Pareles recalled, "They reversed the original order of the verses. They took the lone a cappella vocal track they had from Mr. Bieber, cut it to stutter certain words in the introduction, and pitched it higher and lower in various parts of the song, allowing Mr. Bieber to answer himself from below and harmonize above. They toyed with dance beats, keyboard chords and bass lines — thickening the song and then thinning it again. They concocted sounds that were determinedly different from standard dance-club fare; what seems like a snare drum, for instance, is actually a tweaked version of an Indian tabla." "Where Are Ü Now" was released as the duo's second single from their debut album Skrillex and Diplo Present Jack Ü (2015) on February 27, 2015, and was later released as a bonus track on Bieber's fourth studio album, Purpose (2015). The original version, titled "The Most", was also released as a bonus track on the Japanese version of Purpose.

== Composition ==
"Where Are Ü Now" was written by Sonny "Skrillex" Moore and Thomas Wesley "Diplo" Pentz, Justin Bieber, Jason "Poo Bear" Boyd, Karl Rubin Brutus, and Jordan Ware, and produced by Skrillex and Diplo. The song was composed in G major with a moderately fast tempo of 140 beats per minute and a time signature of 4/4. Bieber's vocal range spans from the low note of E_{3} to the high note of B_{4}. Its instrumentation consists in "fluterring synths", skipping tropical house beats and acres of space, as well as sharp dancehall stabs and an Eastern melody. It features a prominent sound effect that Skrillex has termed "The Dolphin": a chunk of Justin Bieber's vocals that has been worked over and processed into oblivion, turning into a high-pitched squealing sound during the drop. The New York Times released a video showing how the song was assembled using Ableton Live. As Pareles explained, "The song opens hushed and hovering, with a stereo panning whoosh, four somber piano chords and Bieber's electronically stuttered voice, leading into a mournful verse about a friend or lover he helped, who has now abandoned him. Eventually a dance beat kicks in and a mysterious, flutelike squiggle — [which] Skrillex calls it the 'dolphin' — announces itself again and again as the vocals all but disappear, [with] just the occasional refrain, 'Where are you now that I need you?.'" He continued: "Halfway through, the track pauses, then offers another hymnlike verse; the dance beat returns, a little pushier with electronic handclaps, and the refrain and 'dolphin' carry the song to the end, with a final, echoing 'I need you the most.'"

Lyrically, "Where Are Ü Now" talks about caring and praying for an ex who didn't return the favor, with Bieber yearning for compassion amidst a sea of loneliness. He sings: "When you broke down I didn't leave you/ … I was on my knees when nobody else was praying, oh Lord." In another part, he complains: "I gave you the key when the door wasn't open, just admit it [...] See, I gave you faith, turned your doubt into hoping, can't deny it, Now I'm all alone and my joys turned to moping." Some critics, such as Complex's Khal, pointed out that it "finds him writing what could be a note to anyone—or, ahem, Selena Gomez—who might have left him during his turbulent 2014, longing for someone who could comfort him in his time of need." For Sam Corey of The Huffington Post, during the song "Bieber has been posing quite a few existential questions about his love life," noting that lyrically the song "is a serpentine trip through the emotions of despair, codependence and anxious-ambivalence," as he recalls for his long lost love with Gomez. He also observed that the song "serves as a dark portrait of a man struggling to find himself outside of the confines of a woman's love." For Emily Yoshida of The Verge, "'Where Are Ü Now' is about the priceless value of the personal relationship that is forged between a fan and a pop star."

== Critical reception ==
Receiving critical acclaim, "Where Are Ü Now" has been widely considered by critics as a turning point in Bieber's career, with him receiving mainstream critical recognition and marking a shift away from his earlier image as a teen pop idol. Billboard's Jason Lipshutz included "Where Are Ü Now" in its "Top 10 Songs of 2015 (So Far)" list, stating that "[t]his is the Justin Bieber we've been waiting for: emotive, vulnerable and smart enough to join forces with two of electronic music's most reliable maestros. The combination of Justin Bieber's moving falsetto and Skrillex and Diplo's tangled knot of beats makes 'Where Are U Now' a deserved (and much-needed) triumph." Ryan Dombal of Pitchfork wrote the track is "unexpected in all the best ways. It tones down everything you know about Skrillex while retaining his knack for dynamics. Diplo puts his own 10-ton-glowstick tendencies aside as the song combines sharp dancehall stabs and a gloriously sad Eastern melody in a way that recalls golden-age Timbaland. And Justin Bieber sings with something akin to actual human emotion." Markus Papadatos of Digital Journal called it "superb", noting that the song "marks one of Justin Bieber's best vocal performances to date: it is soothing, controlled, delicate and most importantly, extremely radio friendly." Khal of Complex noted that "the beauty is that instead of Bieber being the main dish, he's more the icing on the cake, setting a somber tone that leads into the hypnotic, emotive track." Jon Pareles of The New York Times named it " four minutes of high-tech bliss: a sweet-voiced mixture of longing and recrimination, a lonely plaint with a dance beat."

Michael Cragg in his review for The Guardian opined that "Bieber does his best sadface Drake impression on the lovely, if underwritten [track]. Opening with a lilting, pretty melody on the first verse, it fizzles out by the chorus with its repeated line 'where are you now that I need you' layered over an oddly tweaked, slightly grating synth line that sounds like the mewing of a robotic cat." In her Entertainment Weekly review, Leah Greenblatt explained that the song is "stripped down for maximum aerodynamics, the vocals mentholated and sweetened with a brushstroke of bass here, a snake-charmer synth line there. For Bianca Gracie of Idolator, the song "solidified a genre-bending sound that was bubbling underground" and "ultimately became the best single of his career thus far." Sam C. Mac of Slant Magazine observed that the song "effectively reinvented Bieber's sound," while Andrew Unterberger of Spin called it "Bieber's cred-establishing and career-redefining." Dan Weiss of the same publication wrote that it "comes outfitted with an addictive bent rainforest flute thing that wouldn't sound out of place on, say, M.I.A.'s Kala." Scott Wilson of Fact called it "the jewel in the crown," describing it as "a combination of slick, modern Disneyfied R&B and a synth riff that sounds like a PC Music take on Booka Shade's 'In White Rooms'." He also referred to it as "Bieber's most memorable, and human, vocal performance to date."

=== Accolades ===
Year	Organization	Award	Result
2015	Teen Choice Awards	Choice Music Single: Male Artist	Nominated
2015	Teen Choice Awards	Choice Music: Break-Up Song	Nominated
2015	Teen Choice Awards	Choice Music: Collaboration	Nominated
2015	MTV Video Music Awards	Best Visual Effects	Won
2015	MTV Video Music Awards	Best Art Direction	Nominated
2015	MTV Video Music Awards	Best Editing	Nominated
2015	MTV Video Music Awards	Song of Summer	Nominated
2015	Latin American Music Awards	Favorite Dance Song	Nominated
2015	MTV Europe Music Awards	Best Collaboration	Won
2015	American Music Awards	Collaboration of the Year	Won
2016	Grammy Awards	Best Dance Recording	Won
2016	Kids' Choice Awards	Favorite Collaboration	Nominated
2016	Myx Music Awards	Favorite International Video	Nominated
2016	iHeartRadio Music Awards	Dance Song of the Year	Won
2016	iHeartRadio Music Awards	Best Collaboration	Nominated
2016	Billboard Music Awards	Top Dance/Electronic Song	Nominated

==== Year-end lists ====
Critic/Publication	List	Rank	Ref.
Billboard	Billboard's 25 Best Songs of 2015	5	
Complex	The Best Songs of 2015	4	
Fact	The 50 Best Tracks of 2015	1	
MTV	Best Songs of 2015	12	
The New York Times	The Best Songs of 2015 (by Jon Pareles)	1	
NME	NME's Tracks Of The Year 2015	13	
Pitchfork	The 100 Best Tracks of 2015	38	
Rolling Stone	50 Best Songs of 2015	10	
Spin	The 101 Best Songs of 2015	14	
The Village Voice	Pazz & Jop	13	

== Commercial performance ==
"Where Are Ü Now" was a commercial success, reaching the top-ten in the singer's native Canada, the U.S., and several other territories. In the United States, "Where Are Ü Now" debuted at number 97, and during its seventh week the song entered the top-forty at number 40. Five weeks later, the song jumped to number twenty, becoming Bieber's 15th top-twenty hit and his first since "Heartbreaker" (2013). It was also Skrillex and Diplo's first as lead artists. The song peaked six weeks later, reaching number eight – Bieber's first top-ten hit since "Beauty and a Beat" (2012). Later, after his performance at the 2015 MTV Video Music Awards, the song rebounded to number ten, becoming the first time Bieber had concurrent top 10s for the first time, since his song "What Do You Mean?" was at number-one. The song topped the Dance/Electronic Songs chart, becoming the first leader on the list for all the three artists.

In the United Kingdom, the song managed to peak at number three, becoming Bieber's highest-charting single since 2012's "Boyfriend", Skrillex's first top-ten single out of his previous seven entries, and Diplo's first appearance as a solo artist. The song also peaked at number three in Australia and New Zealand, becoming the highest charting entries for Skrillex, Diplo and Bieber in the former. Eventually, it was certified two-times platinum by the Australian Recording Industry Association (ARIA) and three-time platinum by the Recorded Music NZ; it was also the ninth highest-selling single of 2015 in the latter. The song also reached the top-ten in Denmark, Finland, Ireland, Netherlands and Sweden.

== Music video ==
From May 29 to May 31, 2015, there was an event held at the Jack Ü headquarters for fans to customize the photo-shoots for the "Where Are Ü Now" music video with crayons and colored pastels. Two teasers for the video were released on June 26, 2015, with Samsung+ debuting the video on June 27, 2015, and YouTube and Vevo on June 29, 2015. According to the duo in a post on YouTube, "We are being overwhelmed, in a good way, by the success of 'Where Are Ü Now' with Justin Bieber, so with the video we wanted to just take it back to the beginning of the record and essentially create an ode to our fans. Doing what we do, it's entirely all about the fans. We walk a fine line by being 'famous' and in the public eye but we are only here because of you, the fans. Justin wrote this record during a tough time in his life and it comes to us that sometimes, as artists, we are also just objects and we have to take that as much as we have to use that to create. We all do this for you, respect that you put us here and it's Ü that made the video."

As described by Brittany Spanos of Rolling Stone, "The video opens on an art gallery filled with photos of Bieber's silhouette before shifting to the singer offering an emotional delivery of the track in a dark room. Bieber eventually becomes covered in animated paint, drawings and caricatures. Back in the gallery, Jack Ü fans are providing the illustrations that are appearing over or surrounding Bieber's body as he sings and dances to the track." As noted by Emilee Lindner of MTV News, "The video portrays his internal pain with soft lighting and close-shots, but also displays him as an 'object,' like Jack Ü said, switching to a time-lapse speed while people use him as a canvas for however they want to paint him as." The music video received four nominations at the 2015 MTV Video Music Awards, winning the Best Visual Effects category.

As of May 25, 2024, the music video has more than 1.27 billion views and 6.2 million likes on YouTube.

== Live performances ==
Bieber performed the song with Skrillex and Diplo for the first time at the 2015 Ultra Music Festival. Bieber performed the song again during one of Ariana Grande's shows on The Honeymoon Tour. He later performed the song at the 2015 Wango Tango, at a Calvin Klein music event in Hong Kong, at Hard Fest 2015 and during a medley with "What Do You Mean?" at the 2015 MTV Video Music Awards. On February 15, 2016, Bieber, Skrillex and Diplo performed a "rock-oriented" version of the song at the 58th Grammy Awards. After performing an acoustic rendition of "Love Yourself", Bieber went to the main stage, with Skrillex "shredding on guitar and Diplo playing keyboard and pounding away on big band drums, flanked by a live drummer and onstage orchestrals." Moreover, "Where Are Ü Now" was also included on the set list for the Purpose World Tour. During the performance, "Bieber's crew of dancers tumbled onstage in all-white attire as women suspended in midair did acrobatics against a chrome-y, industrial video backdrop."

== Samples ==
"Where Are Ü Now" was sampled in Craig David's single "16".

== Track listing ==
Digital download – EP
No.	Title	Length
1.	"Where Are Ü Now" (Kaskade Remix)	5:07
2.	"Where Are Ü Now" (Rustie Remix)	3:59
3.	"Where Are Ü Now" (Marshmello Remix)	3:26
4.	"Where Are Ü Now" (Ember Island Cover)	2:32

Drip.com bonus track
No.	Title	Length
5.	"Where Are Ü Now" (Kaskade Radio Edit)	3:56

== Charts ==
=== Weekly charts ===
Chart (2015–2016)	Peak position
Australia (ARIA)	3
Australia Dance (ARIA)	2
Austria (Ö3 Austria Top 40)	29
Belgium (Ultratop 50 Flanders)	15
Belgium (Ultratop 50 Wallonia)	11
Canada Hot 100 (Billboard)	5
Canada CHR/Top 40 (Billboard)	4
Canada Hot AC (Billboard)	32
Czech Republic Airplay (ČNS IFPI)	68
Czech Republic Singles Digital (ČNS IFPI)	7
Denmark (Tracklisten)	8
Finland (Suomen virallinen lista)	7
France (SNEP)	24
Germany (Official German Charts)	33
Hungary (Single Top 40)	28
Hungary (Stream Top 40)	11
Ireland (IRMA)	9
Italy (FIMI)	27
Japan Hot 100 (Billboard)	63
Mexico (Billboard Mexican Airplay)	3
Mexico Anglo (Monitor Latino)	5
Netherlands (Dutch Top 40)	11
Netherlands (Single Top 100)	9
New Zealand (Recorded Music NZ)	3
Norway (VG-lista)	12
Portugal (AFP)	16
Romania Airplay (Media Forest)	3
Scottish Singles Sales (Official Charts)	9
Slovakia Airplay (ČNS IFPI)	72
Slovakia Singles Digital (ČNS IFPI)	16
Spain (PROMUSICAE)	38
Sweden (Sverigetopplistan)	6
Switzerland (Schweizer Hitparade)	28
UK Singles (Official Charts)	3
UK Dance (Official Charts)	1
US Billboard Hot 100	8
US Hot Dance/Electronic Songs (Billboard)	1
US Dance Club Songs (Billboard)	32
US Pop Airplay (Billboard)	6
US Rhythmic Airplay (Billboard)	8

Chart (2026)	Peak position
Global 200 (Billboard)	99
Philippines Hot 100 (Billboard Philippines)	95

=== Year-end charts ===
Chart (2015)	Position
Australia (ARIA)	17
Belgium (Ultratop Flanders)	47
Belgium (Ultratop Wallonia)	80
Canada (Canadian Hot 100)	15
France (SNEP)	81
Germany (Official German Charts)	74
Italy (FIMI)	42
Netherlands (Dutch Top 40)	25
Netherlands (Single Top 100)	15
New Zealand (Recorded Music NZ)	9
Spain (PROMUSICAE)	26
Sweden (Sverigetopplistan)	20
Switzerland (Schweizer Hitparade)	72
UK Singles (Official Charts Company)	15
US Billboard Hot 100	19
US Hot Dance/Electronic Songs (Billboard)	2
US Mainstream Top 40 (Billboard)	26
US Rhythmic (Billboard)	48
Chart (2016)	Position
Canada (Canadian Hot 100)	92
US Hot Dance/Electronic Songs (Billboard)	14

=== Decade-end charts ===
Chart (2010–2019)	Position
US Hot Dance/Electronic Songs (Billboard)	8

== Certifications ==
Region	Certification	Certified units/sales
Australia (ARIA)	6× Platinum	420,000^{‡}
Belgium (BRMA)	Platinum	20,000^{‡}
Canada (Music Canada)	7× Platinum	560,000^{‡}
Denmark (IFPI Danmark)	2× Platinum	120,000^{‡}
France (SNEP)	Platinum	133,333^{‡}
Germany (BVMI)	Gold	200,000^{‡}
Italy (FIMI)	3× Platinum	150,000^{‡}
Mexico (AMPROFON)	Gold	30,000^{*}
New Zealand (RMNZ)	5× Platinum	150,000^{‡}
Norway (IFPI Norway)	2× Platinum	120,000^{‡}
Poland (ZPAV)	Platinum	50,000^{‡}
Spain (Promusicae)	2× Platinum	80,000^{‡}
Sweden (GLF)	Platinum	40,000^{‡}
Switzerland (IFPI Switzerland)	Gold	15,000^{‡}
United Kingdom (BPI)	3× Platinum	1,800,000^{‡}
United States (RIAA)	6× Platinum	6,000,000^{‡}
^{*} Sales figures based on certification alone.^{‡} Sales+streaming figures based on certification alone.

== Release history ==
Country	Date	Format	Label	Ref.
Germany	February 27, 2015	Digital download	Atlantic; Mad Decent; Owsla	
Italy	February 27, 2015	Digital download	Atlantic; Mad Decent; Owsla	
Spain	February 27, 2015	Digital download	Atlantic; Mad Decent; Owsla	
United Kingdom	February 27, 2015	Digital download	Atlantic; Mad Decent; Owsla	
United States	February 27, 2015	Digital download	Atlantic; Mad Decent; Owsla	
United States	April 21, 2015	Mainstream radio	Atlantic; Mad Decent; Owsla	
Italy	May 1, 2015	Radio airplay	Atlantic; Mad Decent; Owsla	
Various	June 16, 2015	Digital download (Remix EP)	Atlantic; Mad Decent; Owsla	
