= Albatraoz =

Swedish music group

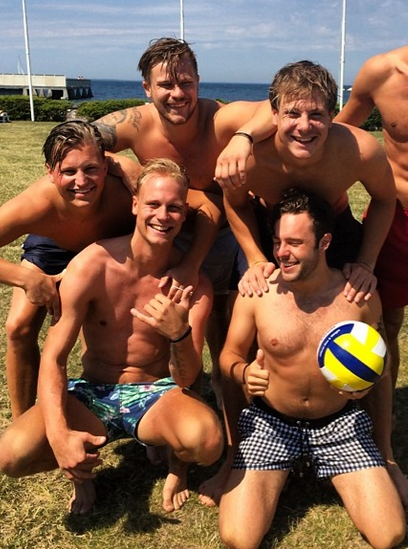
- Albatraoz in 2014

Background information
- Origin: Borås, Sweden
- Genres: Electro house; EDM
- Years active: 2012–present
- Label: House of Albatraoz
- Members: AronChupa; Little Sis Nora; Christoffer Sangré
- Past members: Nicklas Savolainen; Andreas Reinholdsson; Rasmus Sahlberg; Måns Harvidsson
- Website: houseofalbatraoz.com

Albatraoz (pronounced "alba-trouse", see below) is a Swedish group of DJs, singers and producers of electro house from Borås, formed in 2012 originally by AronChupa, Little Sis Nora and the other members Nicklas Savolainen, Andreas Reinholdsson, Rasmus Sahlberg, and Måns Harvidsson.

== History ==
In 2012, they formed the group as a hobby and rose to fame when their debut single "Albatraoz" was released in 2013. The title is a combination of words "albatross" and a wordplay on "trouse" music, which is a form of EDM popularized in the early 2010s by Swedish and Dutch DJs such as Swedish House Mafia and Tiesto.

The song reached thirty-six in Swedish Singles Chart and remained eighteen weeks on the chart. It was certified platinum in Sweden. Later that year, they signed a record deal with Sony Music. In January 2014, the song reached 8.5 million plays on Spotify and the group toured to promote the song. In April 2014, they released their second single, "Arriba".

During a concert in February 2017 in Bohuslän, the group made headlines after the member Måns Harvidsson had pressed a female audience member's face towards his groin on stage. Harvidsson grabbed the victim by her hair and then presses her face against his genitals before he let her go. In an apology to the victim, Harvidsson later explained that the girls would never understand the feeling and he compared it with how actors enters a role in a film. He also said, according to the victim and her friend, "how should I know that she didn't want if I didn't try?".

After the incident the record company Sony Music decided to terminate all cooperation between them and Albatraoz. Harvidsson was also fired from the band the same day, all members cut off contact with him and apologized for the former member's sexual assault. Two years after the incident, in February 2019, Uddevalla District Court sentenced Harvidsson to 80 day-fines for sexual harassment. He was also to pay 5,000 SEK in damages to the victim, which was half of what she had petitioned for. Harvidsson, during his case, had denied the charges and argued that in the event the court would find him guilty, no punishment should be given on the ground that his musical career had already suffered greatly. The court did not find his reasoning valid.

In 2019, Nicklas, Andreas and Rasmus left the group and in 2020 other members joined. They released the hit song "E (Ventex)" which peaked at number 10 on Spotify's "Sweden Top 50"'s chart. Later that year they also had success with the song "Se på mig (Crunk Rock)" which peaked at number 34 on the same list.

== Members ==
=== Current ===
- AronChupa – record producer, vocals (2012–present)
- Little Sis Nora – vocals (2020–present)
- Christoffer Sangré – vocals (2020–present)

=== Former ===
- Nicklas Savolainen – vocals (2012–2019)
- Andreas Reinholdsson – vocals (2012–2019)
- Rasmus Sahlberg – vocals, record producer (2012–2019)
- Måns Harvidsson – vocals (2012–2017)

== Discography ==
=== Albums ===
List of albums, with selected details and chart positions
Title	Details	Peak chart positions
Title	Details	SWE
Albumtraoz	Released: 25 February 2022; Label: House of Albatraoz; Formats: Digital download, streaming	59

=== Singles ===
List of singles, with selected chart positions and certifications
Title	Year	Peak chart positions	Certifications	Album
Title	Year	SWE	Certifications	Album
"Albatraoz"	2013	36	GLF: 2× Platinum	Non-album singles
"Arriba"	2014	—		Non-album singles
"Copacabana"	2014	—		Non-album singles
"Wunderbar"	2015	—		Non-album singles
"General Zod"	2016	—		Non-album singles
"Foxtrot"	2017	—		Non-album singles
"Miljonären (Stek 2020)"	2019	—		Non-album singles
"Defunkt" (with Ture Brute)	2019	— (Note: "Defunkt" did not enter the Swedish Singellista Chart, but peaked at number four on the Swedish Heatseeker Chart.)	GLF: Gold	Non-album singles
"E (Ventex)" (featuring Ture Brute)	2020	12	GLF: 2× Platinum	Albumtraoz
"Mera E"	2020	70		Non-album single
"Se på mig (Crunk Rock)"	2020	34		Albumtraoz
"Rave i mitt garage"	2020	69		Albumtraoz
"Raggarbil"	2020	25		Albumtraoz
"Hörrödu!"	2021	72		Non-album single
"Technotåget"	2021	— (Note: "Technotåget" did not enter the Swedish Singellista Chart, but peaked at number five on the Swedish Heatseeker Chart.)		Albumtraoz
"Skiter väl i det"	2021	— (Note: "Skiter väl i det" did not enter the Swedish Singles Chart, but peaked at number one on the Swedish Heatseeker chart.)		Albumtraoz
"Pollenallergi"	2021	— (Note: "Pollenallergi" did not enter the Swedish Singles Chart, but peaked at number three on the Swedish Heatseeker chart.)		Albumtraoz
"Du kan inte få min öl"	2021	— (Note: "Du kan inte få min öl" did not enter the Swedish Singles Chart, but peaked at number six on the Swedish Heatseeker chart.)		Non-album single
"Mcdonalds"	2021	— (Note: "Mcdonalds" did not enter the Swedish Singles Chart, but peaked at number 13 on the Swedish Heatseeker chart.)		Albumtraoz
"Ung full & dum"	2022	—		Albumtraoz
"Fylla på fjället"	2022	—		Albumtraoz
"Krök i vårat kök"	2022	—		Non-album singles
"Tömmer vi baren"	2022	—		Non-album singles
"Klappa händerna"	2022	—		Non-album singles
"Klappa händerna om du vill ha en shot"	2022	—		Non-album singles
"Multivitamin" (with Sofie Svensson, Dom Dar and Kåren)	2023	30		Non-album singles
"Trucker Motherfucker" (with Sofie Svensson, Dom Dar and Kåren)	2023	9		Non-album singles
"Raggar-Ren"	2023	46		Non-album singles
"Afterski"	2024	—		Non-album singles
"Leva/Dö"	2024	—		Non-album singles
"Balla Ur"	2024	—		Non-album singles
"Hot Shot"	2024	—		Non-album singles
"Långa Burkar"	2025	—		Non-album singles
"Nummerlapp"	2025	—		Non-album singles
"Dekadenz"	2025	—		Non-album singles
"Stad I Ljus"	2025	—		Non-album singles
"Om Jag Var en Dildo"	2026	—		Non-album singles
"Gamer Girl"	2026	—		Non-album singles
"Big City Life"	2026	—		Non-album singles
"Autobahn"	2026	—		Non-album singles
"Tända Grillen" (with Roy Nader)	2026	—		Non-album singles
"—" denotes releases that did not chart or were not released in that territory.

=== Promotional singles ===
Title	Year
"Trodde han va gay"	2020
"Disconostalgi: Rolling Twenties"	2020
"Fläder på Floraängen"	2020
"Pasta & vin"	2020
