= We Are for the Wild Places =

Studio album by Avalanche City
- Released: 3 July 2015
- Recorded: 2014
- Genres: Indie rock; folk rock
- Length: 40:04
- Label: Warner Music New Zealand

Avalanche City chronology
Our New Life Above The Ground (2011)	We Are for the Wild Places (2015)	My Babylon (2019)

Singles from Avalanche City
- 1. "Inside Out" Released: 2015; 2. "Keep Finding a Way" Released: 2015; 3. "I Need You" Released: 2016

We Are for the Wild Places is the second studio album by New Zealand musician Avalanche City, released on 3 July 2015 through Warner Music New Zealand.

== Release and reception ==
Professional ratings
Review scores
Source	Rating
The Music	3.5/4 stars
Otago Daily Times	3/5 stars

Three singles were released for the album, "Inside Out" and "Keep Finding a Way" in 2015 and "I Need You" in 2016.

== Track listing ==
All tracks are written by Dave Baxter.

No.	Title	Length
1.	"I Need You"	3:23
2.	"Keep Finding a Way"	3:24
3.	"Fault Lines"	3:17
4.	"Inside Out"	4:37
5.	"The Midnight/We Never Had Much"	6:02
6.	"Wild Place I"	3:53
7.	"Rabbit"	3:17
8.	"Don't Fall Asleep"	2:00
9.	"Little Fire"	3:08
10.	"Giving Me A Sign"	3:13
11.	"Wild Places II"	3:50
Total length:		40:04

== Charts ==
Weekly chart performance for We Are the Wild Places
Chart (2015)	Peak position
New Zealand Albums (RMNZ)	3
