= I'm an Albatraoz =

2014 song by AronChupa

Single by AronChupa and Little Sis Nora
- Released: 8 August 2014
- Genre: Electro house; Melbourne bounce; electro swing
- Length: 2:47
- Label: Sony
- Songwriters: Aron Ekberg; Nora Ekberg
- Producer: AronChupa (Aron Ekberg)

AronChupa singles chronology
"I'm an Albatraoz" (2014)	"Fired Cuz I Was Late" (2015)

Music video
- "I'm an Albatraoz" on YouTube

"I'm an Albatraoz" (also stylized as "IM AN̓ ALBATRÁOZ") (/ˌælbəˈtraʊs/ AL-bə-TROWSS) is a 2014 single by Swedish DJ and producer AronChupa and Swedish singer Little Sis Nora. The song has been certified seven-times platinum in Sweden, quadruple platinum in Canada, triple platinum in Italy, and double platinum in Australia.

== Music video ==
The video for the single features Aron Ekberg's younger sister Nora Ekberg. It starts off with the song being introduced by a French announcer, with a black background, and the text "A film by AronChupa" and "In association with Sertaç Yıldızhan", accompanied by a pianist.

Daniela Nieves Walker and Willa Holland are shown doing their makeup and applying perfume in a dressing room and act as backup dancers in their dressing gowns. Whilst the video is focused mostly on Nora Ekberg, AronChupa is shown behind a turntable, with an older drummer nearby. Saxophone players are featured.

The video was shot at the Paramount Theatre in the city of Oakland, California. Since 13 October 2014, the official music video has amassed over 1.5 billion views on YouTube as of January 2025, making it one of the top 210 most viewed videos on the site.

== Track listing ==
CD single

1. "I'm an Albatraoz" – 2:47
2. "I'm an Albatraoz" (Extended version) – 4:28
3. "I'm an Albatraoz" (Shortened version) - 1:03

== Charts ==
=== Weekly charts ===
Chart (2014–2015)	Peak position
Australia (ARIA)	2
Austria (Ö3 Austria Top 40)	2
Belgium (Ultratop 50 Flanders)	6
Belgium (Ultratop 50 Wallonia)	4
Canada Hot 100 (Billboard)	8
CIS Airplay (TopHit)	11
Czech Republic Airplay (ČNS IFPI)	4
Czech Republic Singles Digital (ČNS IFPI)	11
Denmark (Tracklisten)	1
Finland (Suomen virallinen lista)	5
France (SNEP)	7
Germany (GfK)	4
Hungary (Dance Top 40)	1
Hungary (Rádiós Top 40)	30
Hungary (Single Top 40)	2
Ireland (IRMA)	48
Italy (FIMI)	7
Netherlands (Dutch Top 40)	4
Netherlands (Single Top 100)	2
Mexico (Monitor Latino)	10
New Zealand (Recorded Music NZ)	3
Norway (VG-lista)	5
Poland Airplay (ZPAV)	13
Poland Dance (ZPAV)	1
Poland (Video Chart)	1
Romania (Airplay 100)	4
Romania Airplay (Media Forest)	1
Scottish Singles Sales (Official Charts)	7
Slovakia Airplay (ČNS IFPI)	15
Slovakia Singles Digital (ČNS IFPI)	9
Spain (Promusicae)	5
Sweden (Sverigetopplistan)	1
Switzerland (Schweizer Hitparade)	6
Turkey (Number One Top 100)	1
UK Singles (Official Charts)	25
UK Dance (Official Charts)	7
US Bubbling Under Hot 100 (Billboard)	10
US Hot Dance/Electronic Songs (Billboard)	10

=== Year-end charts ===
Chart (2014)	Position
Australia (ARIA)	82
Austria (Ö3 Austria Top 40)	74
Germany (Official German Charts)	82
Netherlands (Dutch Top 40)	64
Netherlands (Single Top 100)	49
Sweden (Sverigetopplistan)	20
Chart (2015)	Position
Australia (ARIA)	93
Austria (Ö3 Austria Top 40)	38
Belgium (Ultratop Flanders)	50
Belgium (Ultratop Wallonia)	29
Canada (Canadian Hot 100)	53
CIS (Tophit)	34
France (SNEP)	60
Germany (Official German Charts)	61
Hungary (Dance Top 40)	1
Hungary (Single Top 40)	8
Italy (FIMI)	44
New Zealand (Recorded Music NZ)	50
Russia Airplay (Tophit)	34
Spain (PROMUSICAE)	53
Switzerland (Schweizer Hitparade)	51
Ukraine Airplay (Tophit)	68
US Hot Dance/Electronic Songs (Billboard)	30
Chart (2016)	Position
Hungary (Dance Top 40)	42

== Certifications ==
Region	Certification	Certified units/sales
Australia (ARIA)	2× Platinum	140,000^{^}
Austria (IFPI Austria)	Gold	15,000^{*}
Belgium (BRMA)	Gold	15,000^{*}
Canada (Music Canada)	4× Platinum	320,000^{‡}
Denmark (IFPI Danmark)	2× Platinum	180,000^{‡}
Germany (BVMI)	Platinum	600,000^{‡}
Italy (FIMI)	3× Platinum	150,000^{‡}
Mexico (AMPROFON)	Gold	30,000^{*}
New Zealand (RMNZ)	Platinum	15,000^{*}
Spain (Promusicae)	Platinum	40,000^{‡}
United Kingdom (BPI)	Gold	400,000^{‡}
United States (RIAA)	Gold	500,000^{‡}
Streaming
Denmark (IFPI Danmark)	Platinum	2,600,000^{†}
Sweden (GLF)	7× Platinum	56,000,000^{†}
^{*} Sales figures based on certification alone.^{^} Shipments figures based on certification alone.^{‡} Sales+streaming figures based on certification alone.^{†} Streaming-only figures based on certification alone.
