= Jack Ü =

American DJ duo (2013–2016)

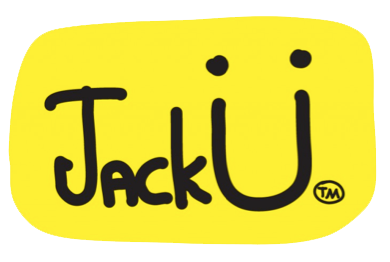

Background information
- Also known as: Skrillex and Diplo
- Origin: Los Angeles, California, U.S.
- Genres: EDM; dubstep; trap; dancehall; electro house
- Years active: 2013–2016
- Labels: Owsla; Mad Decent; Atlantic
- Past members: Skrillex; Diplo

Jack Ü was an American electronic dance music duo consisting of electronic music producers Skrillex and Diplo, formed in 2013. They released their first official single, "Take Ü There", featuring vocals from Kiesza, on October 4, 2014. They released their first and only album, Skrillex and Diplo Present Jack Ü, on February 27, 2015.

Jack Ü performed at Ultra Music Festival Miami in 2014. They also performed at Ultra Music Festival in 2015 with the entire "Jack Ü crew", featuring live contributions from CL, Kai, Diddy, Kiesza and Justin Bieber.

According to Skrillex, the collaboration is called "Jack Ü" because it refers to how the music "jacks you up" with its high energy beats and bassline. The Ü (U with umlaut) letter appears in titles of all of its singles and is usually stylized to look like a smiley.

== History ==
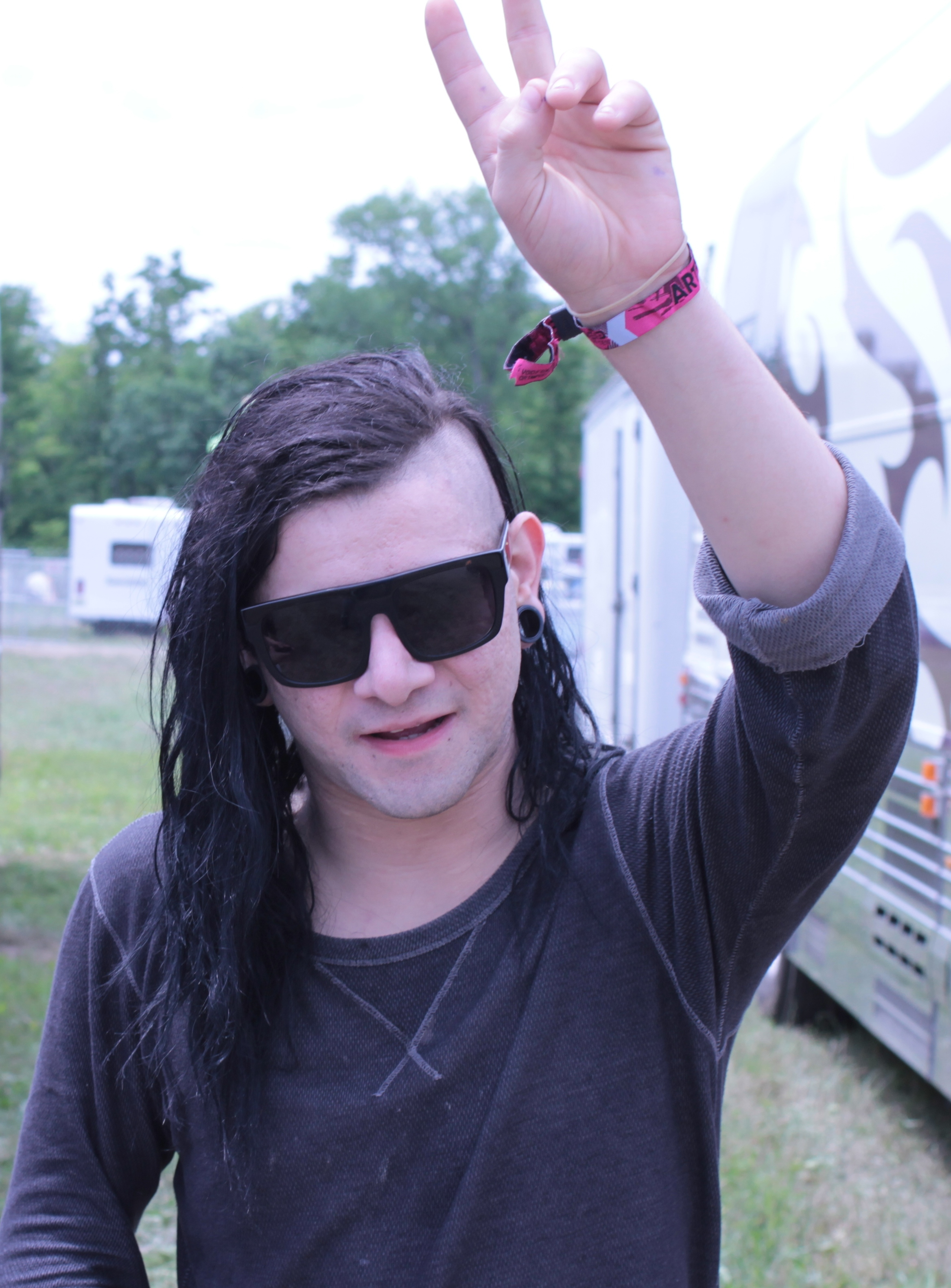
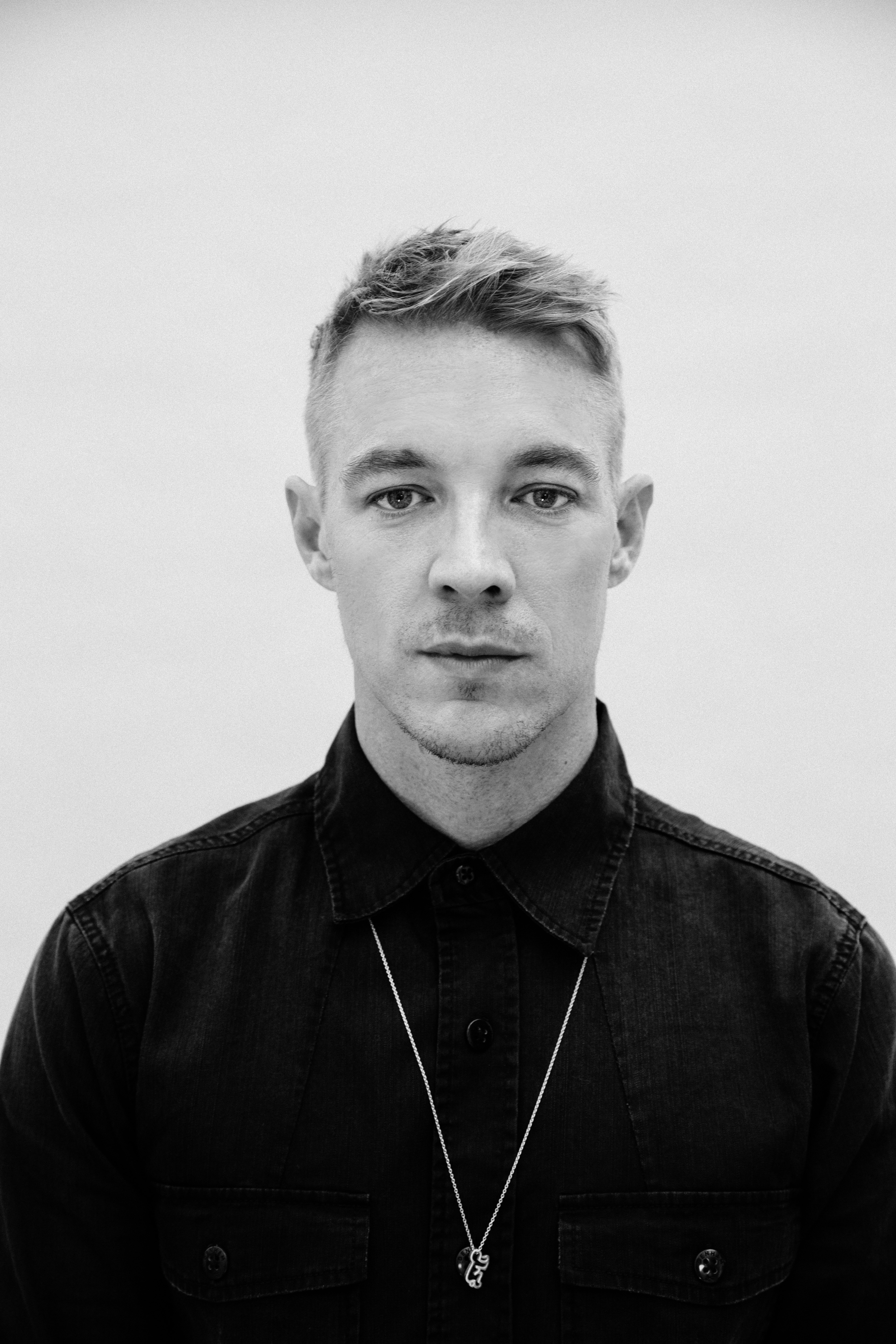
Jack Ü members Skrillex and Diplo

On September 15, 2013, Jack Ü's debut performance took place at Mad Decent Block Party in San Diego with 3 original tracks: a dubstep-juke hybrid track known as "Shark Patrol", "Bounce It", and a very early version of their collaboration with AlunaGeorge that would later be released as "To Ü".

Diplo announced the project by releasing the Mad Decent Block Party lineup with Jack Ü playing at multiple stops on the tour. After some guessing by many of who Jack Ü was, Diplo finally came out to reveal that "Jack Ü ... means Skrillex and Diplo together". The two have worked with each other on assorted projects over the past five years starting with Skrillex singing and playing guitar on a record for Major Lazer, one of Diplo's other projects. In 2011, Diplo also worked on a song with Skrillex titled "Amplifire" (though it was never completed or released) for Bangarang.

On March 30, 2014, Jack Ü was given an hour-long slot to play at the Ultra Music Festival. The set included a wide variety of genres featuring songs from Skrillex's then newly released first studio album, Recess, and including some old school hip hop with DJ Kool's "Let Me Clear My Throat". They later played at the 2015 Ultra Music Festival.

They collaborated on a song that combines trap and dubstep elements and features vocals from Korean pop artists CL and G-Dragon titled "Dirty Vibe" for Skrillex's album Recess. When asked about how the two ended up forming Jack Ü, Diplo stated that Skrillex "was one of the first producers I met when I moved to LA...we just [have] always been really close musically with our ideas." The two get together in downtown LA or in hotel rooms when on tour to make their songs.

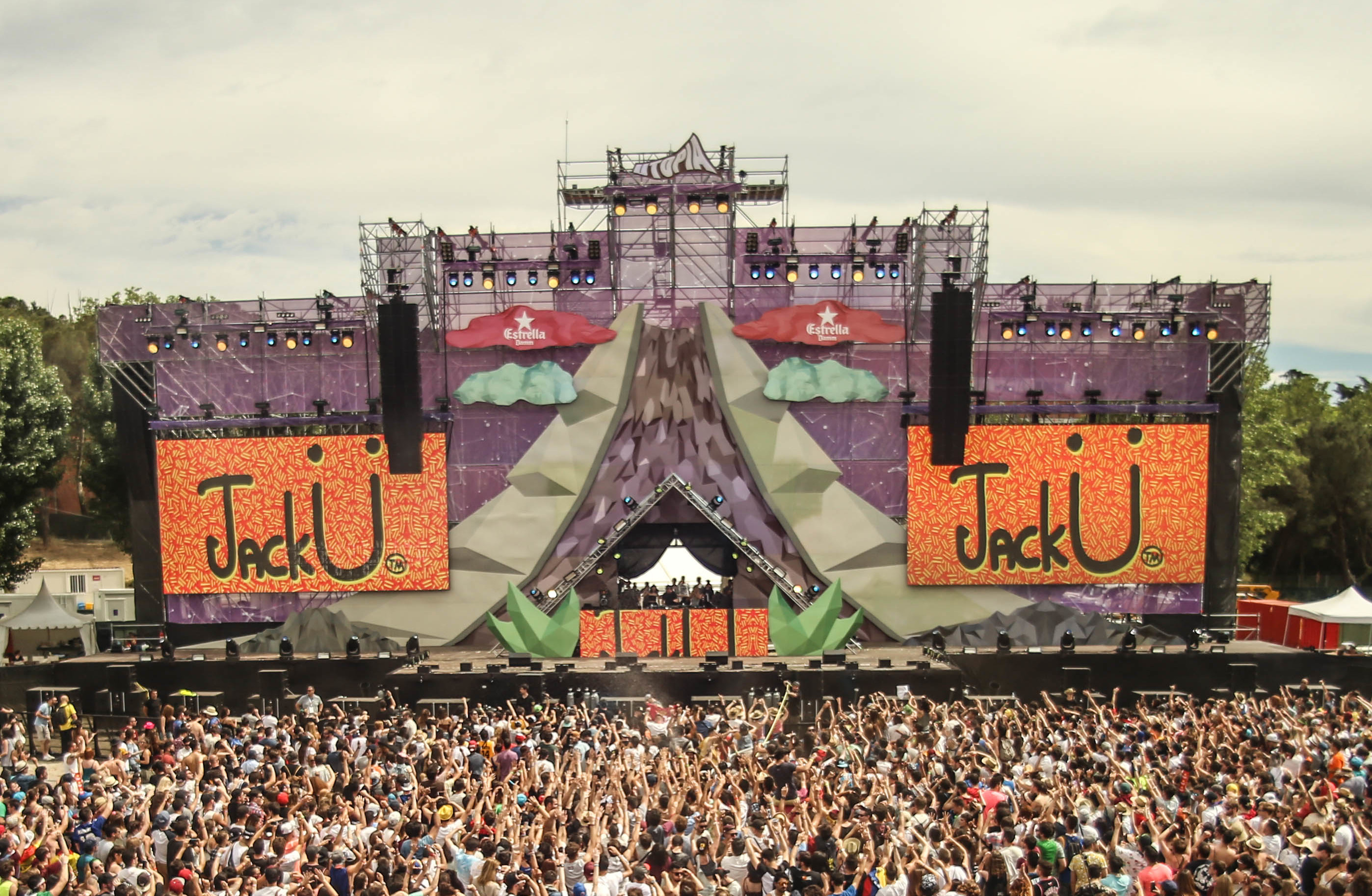
Jack Ü live at Utopía Festival 2016

On December 31, 2014, Jack Ü headlined a concert at Madison Square Garden. Besides their (Diplo and Skrillex) performance, other performers included ASAP Ferg, Rudimental, and Yellow Claw. The concert was broadcast live on Yahoo.

On February 27, 2015, the group released their debut album. They commemorated the event by streaming a 24-hour live DJ set on Twitch, which was shut down 18 hours into the set. By the end of 2015, Jack Ü had over 9.6 million Shazams. That same year, Jack Ü performed at a Clippers half-time show along with Kai, Fly Boi Keno (also known as Keno Kamino) and several other celebrities and dancers, later releasing an official video in December.

On August 28, 2016, Skrillex wrote on his Twitter page that Jack Ü is done touring "for a long long time", a tweet that was shortly deleted. In March 2017, Diplo described in an interview the difficulty of working with Skrillex while Skrillex is signed to a "major label", Atlantic Records. In November 2025, Diplo revealed in a podcast interview that a reunion is stalled due to a serious personal rift, stating that he and Skrillex no longer get along and that attempts at mediation have failed.

== Controversy ==
On September 1, 2014, Seth Troxler was set to play his set at the Robot Heart stage at the Burning Man Festival. However, due to some of his entourage not being allowed to join him behind the DJ decks, Troxler refused to play. Those in charge of the Robot Heart stage needed someone to fill in for Troxler and they asked Skrillex to help. Skrillex played for about half an hour before inviting Diplo to come onto the stage for them to perform as Jack Ü for the rest of the set.

Some of the Robot Heart crowd were unhappy, because Skrillex and Diplo are mainstream producers, and the Robot Heart stage is more about underground artists and songs. To finish up their set Diplo mixed the song "Africa" by Toto into DJ Snake and Lil Jon's platinum record "Turn Down for What" as "an inside joke".

Rumors later surfaced that the two were booed off the stage and forced to end their set early due to playing "Turn Down for What" at a stage that was meant for underground music. Diplo linked to a long statement on his Twitter, saying that "there was no booing... no bad vibes... Everything we did there was good fun and all the people that attended know it".

== Releases ==
Jack Ü's hit debut single, "Take Ü There", was released on September 17, 2014. In an interview with Zane Lowe of BBC's Radio 1 station, Skrillex explained that the making of the song had a unique process; they were set to play a show in Ibiza, Spain when they saw Canadian pop singer Kiesza perform ahead of them. Impressed with her singing, they asked her to do the vocals for a song. They recorded her vocals in their hotel room and finished the song in one night.

During a set at Camp Question Mark of the Burning Man festival (one of eight different sets they played over the course of the festival), the duo played "Take Ü There" along with demo versions of "To Ü", of the electro and future bass genres, featuring vocals from AlunaGeorge. "Beat Knockin'" (Originally titled Beat Steady), which features vocals by New Orleans bounce artist Fly Boi Keno, being some of the first mainstream DJ's to display New Orleans bounce music publicly. In late 2014, Jack Ü played a mix for BBC Radio 1xtra. They played numerous demo versions of tracks and an unreleased song in a two-hour takeover mix including "Febreze" featuring 2 Chainz, "Jungle Bae", "Cumbia Trap" featuring Maluca and "Holla Out" with Snails. "Febreze", "Jungle Bae" and "Holla Out" are all included on their debut record, with "Cumbia Trap" excluded from the album's release. Diplo has also discussed an upcoming Jack Ü mixtape, however no official release date has yet been announced. Skrillex has also mentioned that Jack Ü has "got five songs that we made that aren't even released, and we'll end up releasing in 2014".

On February 27, 2015, after attempting to livestream a 24-hour DJ set on Twitch, which was shut down by local authorities at the 18-hour mark, Skrillex and Diplo released their debut collaborative album entitled Skrillex and Diplo Present Jack Ü on iTunes. Alongside the previously announced six tracks, the album's release included unannounced songs "Where Are Ü Now" with Justin Bieber, "Mind" featuring Kai, "Don't Do Drugs Just Take Some Jack Ü" and a remixed version of "Take Ü There" featuring Missy Elliott.

== Discography ==
=== Studio albums ===
List of studio albums, with selected chart positions and certifications
Title	Album details	Peak chart positions						Certifications
Title	Album details	US	US Dance/ Elec.	AUS	CAN	NZ	UK	Certifications
Jack Ü	Released: February 27, 2015; Label: Atlantic, Mad Decent, Owsla; Formats: CD, digital download, Vinyl	26	1	12	23	15	131	RIAA: Platinum; MC: Platinum; RMNZ: Gold

=== Singles ===
List of singles, with selected chart positions and certifications, showing year released and album name
Title	Year	Peak chart positions										Certifications	Album
Title	Year	US	US Dance Club	US Dance/ Elec.	AUS	CAN	NOR	NZ	SWE	UK	UK Dance	Certifications	Album
"Take Ü There" (featuring Kiesza)	2014	—	37	14	—	—	—	—	—	63	16	RIAA: Platinum	Skrillex and Diplo Present Jack Ü
"Where Are Ü Now" (with Justin Bieber)	2015	8	32	1	3	5	12	3	6	3	1	RIAA: 6× Platinum; ARIA: 6× Platinum; BPI: 2× Platinum; GLF: Platinum; IFPI NOR: 2× Platinum; MC: 7× Platinum; RMNZ: 4× Platinum	Skrillex and Diplo Present Jack Ü
"To Ü" (featuring AlunaGeorge)	2015	—	—	28	83	—	—	—	—	—	—	RIAA: Gold; ARIA: Gold; RMNZ: Platinum	Skrillex and Diplo Present Jack Ü
"—" denotes a recording that did not chart or was not released in that territory.

=== Other charted songs ===
List of other charted songs, with selected chart positions and certifications, showing year released and album name
Title	Year	Peak chart positions	Certifications	Album
Title	Year	US Dance/ Elec.	Certifications	Album
"Beats Knockin" (featuring Fly Boi Keno)	2015	35		Skrillex and Diplo Present Jack Ü
"Febreze" (featuring 2 Chainz)	2015	27		Skrillex and Diplo Present Jack Ü
"Jungle Bae" (featuring Bunji Garlin)	2015	37		Skrillex and Diplo Present Jack Ü
"Mind" (featuring Kai)	2015	24	RIAA: Gold; RMNZ: Gold	Skrillex and Diplo Present Jack Ü

=== Remixes ===
Title	Year	Artist(s)	Album
"7/11"	2014	Beyoncé	Non-album single

=== Music videos ===
List of music videos, showing year released and directors
Title	Year	Director(s)
"Take Ü There" (featuring Kiesza)	2014	Kyle dePinna, Dillon Moore, & Daniel Streit
"Where Are Ü Now" (with Justin Bieber)	2015	Brewer
"To Ü" (featuring AlunaGeorge)	2015	AG Rojas
"Beats Knockin" (featuring Fly Boi Keno)	2015	Edward John Drake
"Mind" (featuring Kai)	2016	Liam Underwood

=== Production credits ===
Title	Year	Artist(s)	Album
"16"	2016	Craig David	Following My Intuition
"Get It Right"	2018	Diplo (featuring MØ)	Give Me Future
"Light Me Up"	2018	RL Grime (featuring Julia Michaels & Miguel)	Nova

== Awards and nominations ==
=== American Music Awards ===
Year	Nominee / work	Award	Result
2015	"Where Are Ü Now" (with Justin Bieber)	Collaboration of the Year	Won

=== Grammy Awards ===
Year	Nominee / work	Award	Result
2016	Skrillex and Diplo Present Jack Ü	Best Dance/Electronic Album	Won
2016	"Where Are Ü Now" (with Justin Bieber)	Best Dance Recording	Won

=== International Dance Music Awards ===
Year	Nominee / work	Award	Result
2016	"Febreze" (with 2 Chainz)	Best Rap/Hip Hop/Trap Dance Track	Nominated
2016	"Where Are Ü Now" (with Justin Bieber)	Best Dubstep/Drum & Bass Track	Won
2016	"Where Are Ü Now" (with Justin Bieber)	Best Commercial/Pop Dance Track	Nominated
2016	"Where Are Ü Now" (with Justin Bieber)	Best Featured Vocalist Performance - Title, Vocalist/Artist	Nominated
2016	"Where Are Ü Now" (with Justin Bieber)	Best Music Video	Nominated
2016	Skrillex and Diplo Present Jack Ü	Best Dubstep/Drum & Bass DJ	Nominated
2016	Skrillex and Diplo Present Jack Ü	Best Artist (Group)	Nominated

=== MTV Video Music Awards ===
Year	Nominee / work	Award	Result
2015	"Where Are Ü Now" (with Justin Bieber)	Best Visual Effects	Won
2015	"Where Are Ü Now" (with Justin Bieber)	Best Art Direction	Nominated
2015	"Where Are Ü Now" (with Justin Bieber)	Best Editing	Nominated
2015	"Where Are Ü Now" (with Justin Bieber)	Song of the Summer	Nominated

=== NRJ Music Awards ===
Year	Awards	Category	Recipient	Outcome	Ref
2016	NRJ Music Awards	Best Collaboration of the Year	Skrillex & Diplo	Nominated	
