= AronChupa =

Swedish music producer

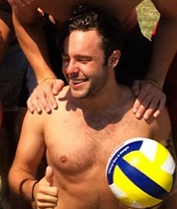
- AronChupa in 2014

Background information
- Born: Aron Michael Ekberg; 30 March 1991 (age 35); Borås, Sweden
- Genres: Dance; electro house; hip hop; electropop; electro swing; pop
- Occupations: Music producer; DJ; rapper; singer; songwriter; music video director
- Years active: 2012–present
- Labels: House of Albatraoz; Sony
- Website: houseofalbatraoz.com

Aron Michael Ekberg (born 30 March 1991), better known by his stage name AronChupa, is a Swedish music producer and DJ. His 2014 song "I'm an Albatraoz" reached number 1 on the Swedish Singles Chart and in Denmark, and top 10 in many charts across Europe. It also reached number 25 in the UK and number 10 in the US dance charts. His younger sister, Nora Ekberg, better known professionally as Little Sis Nora, provided the vocals for the track and starred in the music video, but never appeared as featured artist on the track. The music video has surpassed 1.5 billion views on YouTube.

== Career ==
Ekberg was born in Borås on 30 March 1991. He attended San Francisco's Academy of Art University around 2011–2013 and played on the school's soccer team before moving back to Sweden.

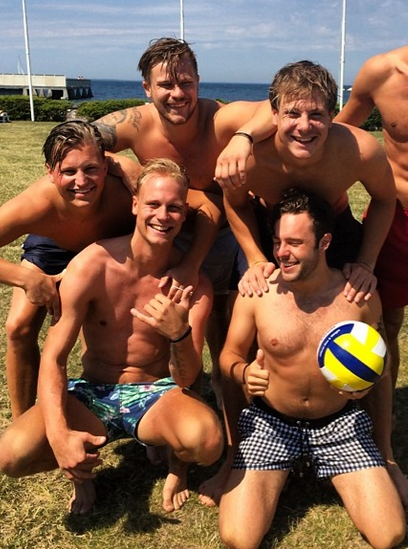
AronChupa (below, right) among the members of Albatraoz

Aron started his professional music career in the electro house-hip hop band Albatraoz, founded in 2012 by himself along with four of his best friends whom he had met while growing up. In August 2013, their debut single was released, the self-titled song "Albatraoz", and shortly after they signed with Sony Music. The song reached 36 on the Swedish Singles Chart and remained on the chart for 18 weeks. "Albatraoz" was certified double platinum in Sweden. In January 2014, the song had reached 8.5 million plays on Spotify and the group toured to promote the song. The band followed up with a few singles, including "Arriba" and "Wunderbar", while touring Scandinavia from 2013 to 2017 before dissolving in 2017.

In March 2014, Ekberg released his debut solo single, "I'm an Albatraoz", with his younger sister, Nora Ekberg, better known as Little Sis Nora, on vocals. After some success independently, Ekberg also signed his solo project to Sony Music. The song reached number 1 in Sweden and Denmark and top 10 in Germany, Austria, Norway, Finland, Australia and the Netherlands. It was certified double platinum in Sweden and Australia and platinum in New Zealand, Italy and Denmark. The music video also has over 1.3 billion views on YouTube.

His second single dropped in November 2015, titled "Fired Cuz I Was Late", and peaked at number 100 in Sweden.

In February 2016, Ekberg released his third solo single, "Little Swing", which features Little Sis Nora. The song gained slight recognition in the UK when Vodafone UK started using it in their roaming advert campaign. In July 2020, he released the song "The Woodchuck Song". It peaked at number 12 on Spotify's "Sweden Viral 50".

== Discography ==
=== Singles ===
Title	Year	Peak chart positions										Certifications	Album
Title	Year	SWE	AUS	AUT	DEN	GER	ITA	NLD	NOR	NZ	POL	Certifications	Album
"I'm an Albatraoz"^{[A]}	2014	1	2	2	1	4	7	2	5	3	13	GLF: 7× Platinum; ARIA: 2× Platinum; BVMI: Platinum; FIMI: 3× Platinum; IFPI AUT: Gold; IFPI DEN: 2× Platinum; RMNZ: Platinum	Non-album singles
"Fired Cuz I Was Late"	2015	100	—	—	—	—	—	—	—	—	—	GLF: Gold	Non-album singles
"Little Swing" (featuring Little Sis Nora)	2016	— (Note: "Little Swing" did not enter the Sverigetopplistan chart, but peaked at number one on the Heatseeker chart.)	—	—	—	—	—	—	—	—	—	GLF: Platinum; ZPAV: Gold	Non-album singles
"She Wants Me Dead" (with Cazzette featuring The High)	2016	—	—	—	—	—	—	—	—	—	—		Non-album singles
"Bad Water" (featuring J & The People)	2016	—	—	—	—	—	—	—	—	—	—		Non-album singles
"Llama in My Living Room" (featuring Little Sis Nora)	2017	— (Note: "Llama in My Living Room" did not enter the Swedish Singles Chart, but peaked at number 20 on the Swedish Heatseeker chart.)	—	—	—	—	—	—	—	—	23	GLF: Platinum; ZPAV: Diamond	Non-album singles
"Rave in the Grave" (with Little Sis Nora)	2018	93	—	—	—	—	—	—	—	—	21	GLF: Gold; ZPAV: 3× Platinum	Non-album singles
"Hole in the Roof" (with Little Sis Nora)	2019	—	—	—	—	—	—	—	—	—	29		Non-album singles
"Thai Massage" (with Little Sis Nora)	2020	—	—	—	—	—	—	—	—	—	—		Non-album singles
"First Class Jazz"	2020	—	—	—	—	—	—	—	—	—	—		Non-album singles
"The Woodchuck Song" (with Little Sis Nora)	2020	83	—	—	—	—	—	—	—	—	—	GLF: Platinum	Non-album singles
"What Was in That Glass" (with Little Sis Nora)	2020	—	—	—	—	—	—	—	—	—	—		Non-album singles
"Trombone" (with Little Sis Nora)	2021	—	—	—	—	—	—	—	—	—	—		Non-album singles
"Lai Lai (Radio Edit)"	2021	—	—	—	—	—	—	—	—	—	—		Non-album singles
"Booty Call" (with Little Sis Nora)	2022	—	—	—	—	—	—	—	—	—	—		Non-album singles
"Coco Song" (with Flamingoz)	2022	—	—	—	—	—	—	—	—	—	—		Non-album singles
"Tequila" (with Flamingoz)	2022	—	—	—	—	—	—	—	—	—	—		Non-album singles
"Dance 'Til We Die (Emma’s Song)" (with Little Sis Nora)	2022	—	—	—	—	—	—	—	—	—	—		Non-album singles
"California Sun" (with Little Sis Nora and Jungle Jonsson)	2022	—	—	—	—	—	—	—	—	—	—		Non-album singles
"Boogie Shoes" (with Little Sis Nora)	2023	—	—	—	—	—	—	—	—	—	—		Non-album singles
"Captain Coke" (with Little Sis Nora)	2023	—	—	—	—	—	—	—	—	—	—		Non-album singles
"Tangaman" (with Little Sis Nora)	2023	—	—	—	—	—	—	—	—	—	—		Non-album singles
"Misery" (with Little Sis Nora)	2024	—	—	—	—	—	—	—	—	—	—		Non-album singles
"The Genre Police" (with Little Sis Nora featuring S3RL)	2024	—	—	—	—	—	—	—	—	—	—		Non-album singles
"I'm an Albatraoz Again" (with Little Sis Nora)	2024	—	—	—	—	—	—	—	—	—	—		Non-album singles
"Ping Pong" (with Little Sis Nora)	2025	—	—	—	—	—	—	—	—	—	—		Non-album singles
"Bag on the Bus"	2025	—	—	—	—	—	—	—	—	—	—		Non-album singles
"What's It Gonna Take?" (with Little Sis Nora)	2025	—	—	—	—	—	—	—	—	—	—		Eurotrash
"Galliano"	2025	—	—	—	—	—	—	—	—	—	—		Non-album singles
"Cash on Grooves"	2026	—	—	—	—	—	—	—	—	—	—		Non-album singles
"AI"	2026	—	—	—	—	—	—	—	—	—	—		Non-album singles
"Funk You"	2026	—	—	—	—	—	—	—	—	—	—		Non-album singles
"—" denotes releases that did not chart or were not released in that territory.

=== Remixes ===
==== 2016 ====
- Little Richard – "Tutti Frutti" (AronChupa Remix)

==== 2017 ====
- Dirtywknd – "Dirty Weekend" (AronChupa Remix)
- Marcus & Martinus – "Make You Believe in Love" (AronChupa Remix)
- This Diamond Life feat. Karen Harding – "The Weekend"
- The Collapsable Hearts Club feat. Jim Bianco & Petra Haden – "Easy Street" (AronChupa Remix) / Featured in "The Cell", an episode of The Walking Dead aired on 6 November 2016.

== Notes ==
- A: Swedish singer and AronChupa's younger sister Nora Ekberg provides the vocals for the tracks.
