= Avalanche City =

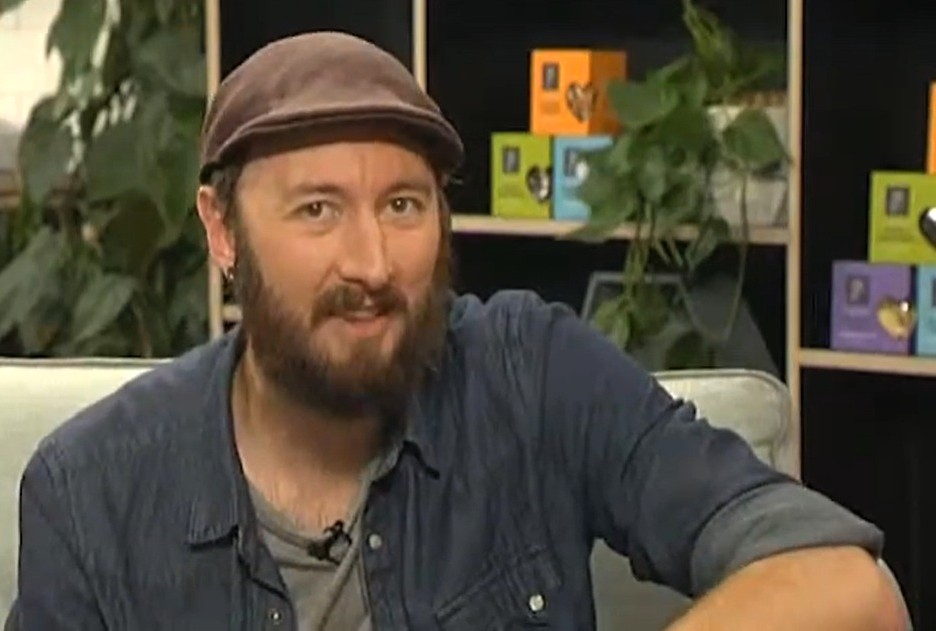
- Baxter in 2016

Background information
- Born: Dave Baxter; Auckland, New Zealand
- Origin: Auckland, New Zealand
- Genre: Indie folk
- Occupation: Musician
- Instruments: Vocals, guitar
- Years active: 2009–present
- Labels: Warner Music New Zealand; The Guacamole Farm

Avalanche City is the stage name of indie folk musician Dave Baxter from Auckland, New Zealand. He is best known for his 2011 New Zealand No. 1 single "Love, Love, Love" and his 2015 single "Inside Out", which also charted at No. 1. In 2011, Dave Baxter was awarded the APRA Silver Scroll and nominated for three New Zealand Music Awards, including Breakthrough Artist of the Year, Song of the Year and Album of the Year.

== History ==
=== Early life ===
Baxter began playing guitar at age nine and during his teens he performed in the bands One Must Fall and The Chase. He studied at Waikato Institute of Technology in Hamilton, graduating in 2005 with a Bachelor of Media Arts (Commercial Music).

=== 2011–2014 Our New Life Above the Ground ===
In late 2009 Baxter left his job as a music writer and began recording bands in his own studio. He also began to write songs, practice singing, and create his own melodies. After performing his songs for friends, Baxter started Avalanche City and began touring with other musicians. He eventually decided to record the album Our New Life Above the Ground at Kourawhero Hall and offered it as a free download from Avalanche City's official website. Initial response to the album was extremely positive and the song "Love, Love, Love" was picked up by the local New Zealand TV station TV2 TV2 for their station promos. After this point the song placed on the New Zealand singles chart.

The album Our New Life Above the Ground was then re-released and sold well, placing number 4 on the official national albums chart and achieving gold status.

=== 2015–2018 We are for the Wild Places ===
After 4 years since the release of the Baxter's record breaking debut single Love Love Love, he released his highly anticipated new album, We are for the Wild Places in July 2015. The album's first single Inside Out was very popular and quickly reached number one on the Official New Zealand Music Chart and was certified Platinum. The album itself was placed no 3 on the Official Top 40 Albums Chart. The second official single from the album, Keep Finding A Way has been released to radio late August.

=== 2019–2023 My Babylon ===
"My Babylon" was released on 22 February 2019, featuring nine new tracks available on streaming platforms, digital download, vinyl, and CD. Among the most popular tracks were "Prayed for Love," "Whispers," and the title track, "My Babylon." Following the release, Dave took an extended break from music for nearly five years. In a 2024 video blog on YouTube titled "Why I Quit Music, And Why I'm Coming Back," he detailed his reasons for the hiatus, primarily citing burnout. At the time, he was uncertain if or when he would return to Avalanche City.

=== 2024 – present Return from Hiatus ===
In 2024, Dave returned to music with the release of his single "Keep That Love" on 24 May 2024, along with the promise of at least one more single in the near future.

In January 2025, Baxter headlined Festival One, a festival in Karapiro, New Zealand.

== Discography ==
Avalanche City discography
- Studio albums: 3
- Extended plays: 1
- Singles: 8
- Music videos: 9

=== Studio albums ===
Title	Album details	Peak positions		Certifications
Title	Album details	NZ	AUS	Certifications
Our New Life Above the Ground	Released: 4 April 2011; Label: Warner Music; Formats: CD, digital download	4	97	RMNZ: Gold
We are for the Wild Places	Released: 3 July 2015; Label: Warner Music; Formats: CD, vinyl, digital download	3	—	
My Babylon	Released: 22 February 2019; Label: The Guacamole Farm; Formats: CD, vinyl, digital download	27	—	
"—" denotes releases that were not released or did not chart in that region.

=== Extended plays ===
Title	Album details
Snow	Released: 4 April 2011; Label: Warner Music; Formats: CD, digital download

=== Singles ===
Title	Year	Peak positions		Certifications	Album
Title	Year	NZ	AUS	Certifications	Album
"Love Love Love"	2011	1	49	RMNZ: 2× Platinum	Our New Life Above the Ground
"Ends in the Ocean"	2011	—	—		Our New Life Above the Ground
"You and I"	2011	—	—		Our New Life Above the Ground
"Sunset"	2012	—	—		Our New Life Above the Ground
"Inside Out"	2015	1	—	RMNZ: Platinum	We are for the Wild Places
"Keep Finding a Way"	2015	—	—		We are for the Wild Places
"Prayed for Love"	2018	— (Note: "Prayed for Love" did not enter the NZ Top 40 Singles Chart, but peaked at number 15 on the NZ Hot Singles Chart.)	—		My Babylon
"My Babylon"	2019	—	—		My Babylon
"Keep That Love"	2024	—	—		Non-album single
"—" denotes releases that were not released or did not chart in that region.

=== Music videos ===
Title	Director(s)	Year	Ref.
"Love Love Love"	Josh Smith	2011	
"Ends in the Ocean"	Jefferton James	2011	
"You and I"	Jefferton James	2011	
"Sunset"	Kyle Eaton	2012	
"Inside Out"	Chris Lane	2015	
"Keep Finding a Way"	Josh Smith	2015	
"Little Fire"	Chris Lane	2016	
"Prayed for Love"	Mark Fruish	2018	
"My Babylon"	Mark Fruish	2019	

== Awards and nominations ==
Year	Organisation	Nominated work	Award	Result
2011	APRA Silver Scroll Awards	"Love, Love, Love"	Silver Scroll Award	Won
2011	New Zealand Music Awards	"Love, Love, Love"	Single of the Year	Nominated
2011	New Zealand Music Awards	Our New Life Above Ground	Album of the Year	Nominated
2011	New Zealand Music Awards	Avalanche City	Breakthrough Artist of the Year	Nominated
2012	APRA Silver Scroll Awards	"Love, Love, Love"	Most Performed Work in New Zealand	Won
2015	New Zealand Music Awards	"Inside Out"	Single of the Year	Nominated
