= Inside Out (Avalanche City song) =

Single by Avalanche City

from the album We are for the Wild Places
- Released: July 3, 2015
- Genre: Indie folk
- Length: 4:37
- Label: Warner Music New Zealand
- Songwriter(s): Dave Baxter

Avalanche City singles chronology
"Sunset" (2012)	"Inside Out" (2015)	"Keep Finding A Way" (2015)

"Inside Out" is single from New Zealand folk band Avalanche City. Released in 2015, the song reached number one in the Official New Zealand Music Chart and as of 20 September 2015 has charted for 13 weeks. The song is the only New Zealand song to make it to number one in 2015, in the New Zealand top 40 charts.

== Music videos ==
A preview music video was released on 27 April 2015. Directed by Dave Murray. The video won the 2015 Raglan Arts Film Festival Awards "Best Music Video Award".

A music video for the song was released on 30 July 2015. Directed by Chris Lane

== Track listing ==
Digital download

1. "Inside Out" – 4:37

== Charts and certification ==
=== Weekly charts ===
Chart (2015)	Peak position
New Zealand (Recorded Music NZ)	1

=== Year-end charts ===
Chart (2015)	Position
New Zealand (Recorded Music NZ)	39

=== Certifications ===
Region	Certification	Certified units/sales
New Zealand (RMNZ)	Platinum	15,000^{*}
^{*} Sales figures based on certification alone.
