= Jack Ü (album) =

Studio album by Jack Ü
- Released: February 27, 2015
- Genre: EDM
- Length: 31:55
- Labels: Owsla; Mad Decent; Atlantic
- Producers: Jack Ü; Diplo; Skrillex; Jordan Ware; Karl Rubin Brutus; Snails

Skrillex chronology
Recess (2014)	Jack Ü (2015)	Show Tracks (2019)

Diplo chronology
Random White Dude Be Everywhere (2014)	Jack Ü (2015)	California (2018)

Singles from Jack Ü
- 1. "Take Ü There" Released: October 4, 2014; 2. "Where Are Ü Now" Released: February 27, 2015; 3. "To Ü" Released: October 22, 2015

Jack Ü is the only studio album by American DJ duo Jack Ü, individually known as Skrillex and Diplo. It was released on February 27, 2015, by Owsla and Mad Decent, Skrillex and Diplo's respective labels. The album features collaborations with a range of artists including Kiesza, AlunaGeorge, 2 Chainz, Missy Elliott and Justin Bieber. It also features the Trinidadian soca artist Bunji Garlin. The album produced the internationally successful single "Where Are Ü Now" featuring Justin Bieber.

The album won the Grammy Award for Best Dance/Electronic Album and "Where Are Ü Now" won the Grammy Award for Best Dance Recording at the 58th Annual Grammy Awards.

== Background ==
The first track to emerge from the duo was "Take Ü There" featuring Canadian musician Kiesza. In an interview with BBC Radio 1's Zane Lowe, Skrillex explained that the making of this song had a unique process: He and Diplo were set to play a show in Ibiza when they saw Canadian pop singer Kiesza perform ahead of them. Impressed with her singing, they asked her to do the vocals for a song. They recorded her in their hotel room and finished the song in one night. During a set at Camp Question Mark of the Burning Man festival (one of eight different sets they played over the course of the festival), the duo played "Take Ü There" along with an unreleased track titled "To Ü", of the electro and future bass genres, featuring vocals from AlunaGeorge. "Beat Steady Knockin'", which features vocals by New Orleans bounce artist Fly Boi Keno, was also played. It was later re-titled "Beats Knockin" for the album's release.

In early 2015, Jack Ü played numerous unreleased tracks in a two-hour takeover mix on BBC Radio 1Xtra. Tracks played included "Febreze" featuring 2 Chainz, "Jungle Bae", "Cumbia" featuring Maluca and a new collaboration with Snails entitled "Holla Out". "Febreze", "Jungle Bae" and "Holla Out" were all included on the album, while "Cumbia" featuring Maluca was excluded from the album. Skrillex has also mentioned that Jack Ü has "got five songs that we made that aren't even released, and we'll end up releasing in 2014". On February 27, 2015, Skrillex and Diplo released the album on iTunes. Alongside the previously revealed six tracks, the album's release included unannounced songs "Where Are Ü Now" featuring Justin Bieber, "Mind" featuring Kai and vocals from Skrillex, "Don't Do Drugs Just Take Some Jack Ü" and a remixed version of "Take Ü There" with Missy Elliott.

== Singles ==
"Take Ü There" featuring Kiesza was released as the lead single from the album on October 4, 2014, reaching number sixteen on the UK Dance Chart. "Where Are Ü Now" was released as the second official single simultaneously with the album on February 27, 2015. The song is a collaboration with Canadian musician Justin Bieber. The track has so far reached number 8 on the Billboard Hot 100 and number 3 on the UK Singles Chart, becoming the duo's biggest hit on both charts thus far. Moreover, the song peaked at number three in Australia, currently the highest peak of the single worldwide. The song was hugely successful throughout Europe, reached the top-ten in Sweden and Finland, as well as the top-twenty in Norway, Czech Republic, Denmark and Slovakia. It has also charted in Bieber's native Canada, peaking at number 6. Although not released as an official single, "To Ü" was added to BBC Radio 1Xtra's C-Playlist on March 23, 2015.

== Critical reception ==
Professional ratings
Aggregate scores
Source	Rating
Metacritic	70/100
Review scores
Source	Rating
AllMusic	3.5/5 stars
AbsolutePunk	6/10
Complex	3.5/5 stars
Consequence of Sound	C−
The Guardian	3/5 stars
NME	3.5/5 stars
Pitchfork	6.8/10
Rolling Stone	3.5/5 stars
Spin	7/10
Tom Hull	B+

The album received positive reviews from music critics. At Metacritic, which gives out a rating out of 100, the album received a score of 70 based on a number of 8 reviews, which says that they were "generally favorable reviews". Also, at Rolling Stone, which gives out a rating out of 5 stars to said criticised albums, the album received from the critic 3.5 out of 5 stars.

Nick Murray of Rolling Stone went so far as to describe the album as "as forward-sounding as any dance release in recent memory." The Pitchfork review by Corban Goble, instead stated that "Jack Ü doesn't exactly roll the ball forward", but that the album should be praised for being "maximalist party music". Goble also noted the world-music influence that Diplo and "ragga soca artist Bunji Garlin" brought to the album, singling out Jungle Bae featuring Garlin as one of the record's best tracks.

== Commercial performance ==
Once the album was released to the public, it entered into the Billboard 200 chart, debuting at number 26, selling a rounded 14,000 copies in its first week of release. On June 22, 2016, the album was certified gold by the Recording Industry Association of America (RIAA), for combined album sales, on-demand audio, video streams, track sales equivalent of 500,000.

== Track listing ==
Skrillex and Diplo Present Jack Ü — Standard Edition
No.	Title	Writer(s)	Length
1.	"Don't Do Drugs Just Take Some Jack Ü"	Sonny Moore; Thomas Pentz	2:05
2.	"Beats Knockin" (featuring Fly Boi Keno)	Kenneth J. Hurst Jr.; Moore; Pentz	2:53
3.	"Take Ü There" (featuring Kiesza)	Henry Walter; Kiesa Rae Ellestad; Lukasz Gottwald; Moore; Pentz	3:30
4.	"Febreze" (featuring 2 Chainz)	Moore; Tauheed Epps; Pentz	3:34
5.	"To Ü" (featuring AlunaGeorge)	Aluna Francis; George Reid; Moore; Pentz	3:57
6.	"Jungle Bae" (featuring Bunji Garlin and MX Prime)	Andrew Bisnaught; Huguet Guilliaume; Ian Alvarez; Jeremy Fossy; Kavudi Elie; Kenry Fossy; Moore; Pentz	3:28
7.	"Mind" (featuring Kai)	Alessia De Gasperis-Brigante; Yonatan Ayal; Moore; Pentz	4:02
8.	"Holla Out" (featuring Snails & Taranchyla)	Ashante "Taranchyla" Reid; Frédérik "Snails" Durand; Moore; Pentz	4:16
9.	"Where Are Ü Now" (with Justin Bieber)	Justin Bieber; Jason Boyd; Jordan Ware; Karl Rubin; Moore; Pentz	4:10
Total length:			31:55

Skrillex and Diplo Present Jack Ü – bonus track
No.	Title	Writer(s)	Length
10.	"Take Ü There" (featuring Kiesza) (Missy Elliott Remix)	Walter; Ellestad; Gottwald; Melissa Arnette Elliott; Moore; Pentz	3:30

Skrillex and Diplo Present Jack U – Japan version bonus tracks
No.	Title	Writer(s)	Length
11.	"Take Ü There" (featuring Kiesza) (Zeds Dead Remix)	Walter; Ellestad; Gottwald; Moore; Pentz	4:08
12.	"Take Ü There" (featuring Kiesza) (Tujamo Remix)	Walter; Ellestad; Gottwald; Moore; Pentz	4:31

Sample credits

- "Holla Out" features a sample from "Train Sequence" by Geoffrey Sumner. It also features excerpt from an unreleased Skrillex track known as "Tabasco" and interpolates "Headlines" by Drake.

== Charts ==
=== Weekly charts ===
Chart (2015)	Peak position
Australian Albums (ARIA)	12
Australian Dance Albums (ARIA)	1
Belgium Albums (Ultratop Flanders)	78
Canadian Albums (Billboard)	23
Danish Albums (Hitlisten)	10
Dutch Albums (MegaCharts)	83
Finnish Albums (Suomen virallinen lista)	33
Hungarian Albums (MAHASZ)	25
New Zealand Albums (Recorded Music NZ)	15
Norwegian Albums (VG-lista)	11
Swedish Albums (Sverigetopplistan)	21
UK Albums (OCC)	131
UK Dance Albums (Official Charts)	12
US Billboard 200	26
US Top Dance Albums (Billboard)	1

=== Year-end charts ===
Chart (2015)	Position
Swedish Albums (Sverigetopplistan)	48
US Billboard 200	64
US Top Dance/Electronic Albums (Billboard)	5
Chart (2016)	Position
US Top Dance/Electronic Albums (Billboard)	7
Chart (2017)	Position
US Top Dance/Electronic Albums (Billboard)	23

== Certifications ==
Region	Certification	Certified units/sales
Canada (Music Canada)	Platinum	80,000^{‡}
Denmark (IFPI Danmark)	Gold	10,000^{‡}
New Zealand (RMNZ)	Gold	7,500^{‡}
United States (RIAA)	Platinum	1,000,000^{‡}
^{‡} Sales+streaming figures based on certification alone.

== Release history ==
Country	Date	Format	Label	Ref.
Worldwide	February 27, 2015	Digital download	Atlantic; Mad Decent; Owsla	
Worldwide	June 2, 2015	CD; LP	Atlantic; Mad Decent; Owsla	
