= Jarryd James (EP) =

EP by Jarryd James
- Released: 3 September 2015
- Length: 19:36
- Label: Interscope Records
- Producer: Stuart Stuart

Jarryd James chronology
Jarryd James (2015)	Thirty One (2015)

Jarryd James is the debut extended play (EP) by Australian alternative pop singer-songwriter and producer Jarryd James. The EP was released in United States of America on 3 September 2015, a week before his studio album was released in Australia.

== Reception ==
Alternative Addictions gave the EP 3 out of 5 saying; "The five songs on this EP will give you a taste of what James does. He features some great rhythm lines underneath his honey piercing vocal" adding "While not being the dominant thing in the music all the time, the vocal from James is the primarily reason to listen to this EP. His vocal is amazing and just that side of the EP overall is worth listening to."

== Track listing ==
No.	Title	Writer(s)	Length
1.	"Do You Remember"	Jarryd James, Joel Little	3:54
2.	"This Time (Serious Symptoms, Simple Solutions)"	James, Little	4:18
3.	"Give Me Something"	James, Little	3:11
4.	"Sure Love"	James, Pip Norman	3:41
5.	"Regardless" (featuring Julia Stone)	James, Stone	4:33
