= The Dandy Warhols Are Sound =

Studio album by The Dandy Warhols
- Released: July 14, 2009
- Recorded: September 11, 2001 – December 2, 2002
- Genre: New wave
- Length: 55:35
- Label: Beat the World

The Dandy Warhols chronology
...Earth to the Dandy Warhols... (2008)	The Dandy Warhols Are Sound (2009)	The Capitol Years 1995–2007 (2010)

The Dandy Warhols Are Sound is the seventh studio album by American alternative rock band The Dandy Warhols. It is the original mix of the band's 2003 album Welcome to the Monkey House, by soul music mixing engineer Russell Elevado. It was released on July 14, 2009, through the band's own label Beat the World Records.

== Background ==
Before the release of Welcome to the Monkey House, the band had been pressing for a version mixed by Elevado, whose credits include D'Angelo's Brown Sugar, The Roots' The Roots Come Alive, Common's Like Water for Chocolate and Alicia Keys' Songs in A Minor, along with some others. The Elevado mix of Monkey House was shelved by Capitol Records and an alternate mix by Nick Rhodes of Duran Duran was put out instead. Peter Holmstrom later said that Monkey House was not the version that he wanted released. In 2008, the band split from Capitol and formed their own label, Beat the World Records. With the band now on its own label, Holmstrom said the band decided the time was right to release the album's original mix.

As Courtney Taylor-Taylor describes it, "There are two different approaches to mixing. One is very slick and clean, and Welcome to the Monkey House fits more into that category. Are Sound, however, has a sneakier profile. It seems very lo-fi and earthy, but the fact is, it's extremely precise."

== Reception ==
Professional ratings
Aggregate scores
Source	Rating
Metacritic	62/100
Review scores
Source	Rating
AllMusic	3.5/5 stars
The A.V. Club	C
Drowned in Sound	6/10
PopMatters	6/10
Uncut	3/5 stars

The album received a lukewarm critical reception in comparison to Welcome to the Monkey House. Uncut magazine wrote, "an LP that once raved shamelessly now shuffles, twitchily." The A.V. Club, which praised Monkey House, called this mix "basically a tasteful killjoy. The bass is reduced to human levels, most of the synths are purged and the drums sound thin and trembly. The first Monkey House is full of consistently aggressive hook-mongering; this version is all deliberately becalmed jamming and repetition."

== Track listing ==
All tracks are written by Courtney Taylor-Taylor, except as noted.

No.	Title	Writer(s)	Length
1.	"Burned"		7:02
2.	"Scientist"		3:13
3.	"We Used to Be Friends"		4:11
4.	"The Last High"	Evan Dando, Taylor-Taylor	6:27
5.	"Wonderful You"		4:28
6.	"The Dandy Warhols Love Almost Everyone"		2:12
7.	"I Am Over It"		4:46
8.	"Heavenly"		3:21
9.	"Plan A"		4:59
10.	"Rock Bottom"		3:02
11.	"I Am Sound"		4:05
12.	"Insincere"		3:30
13.	"Pete Int'l Spaceport"		4:19

Bonus tracks
No.	Title	Length
14.	"You Ain't Goin Nowhere"	2:52
15.	"Last High" (live at the Enmore, Sydney, Australia, 2008)	4:13
