= Break Me Down =

Break Me Down may refer to:

- "Break Me Down", a 2020 song by Cub Sport and Mallrat from Like Nirvana
- "Break Me Down", a 2006 song by Drake Bell from It's Only Time
- "Break Me Down", a 2016 song by Logan Lynn from Adieu
- "Break Me Down", a 2006 song by Red from End of Silence
