= Turn Me Out =

Turn Me Out may refer to:

- Turn Me Out (Praxis song)
- Turn Me Out (EP), a remix EP by Logan Lynn
