= Turn Me Out (EP) =

EP / Remix album by Logan Lynn
- Released: August 14, 2012
- Recorded: 2012
- Genre: Electropop
- Label: Logan Lynn Music
- Producer: Logan Lynn

Logan Lynn chronology
Do You Want Me Or Not? (2012)	Turn Me Out (2012)	Comp 175: A Benefit for Queer Programs and Services in the Pacific Northwest (album) (2012)

The Turn Me Out Remix EP is a five-song EP of new music released by Logan Lynn on August 14, 2012. It featured previously unreleased remixes of Lynn's "Turn Me Out", released earlier that same year.

== Release ==
Logan Lynn held a public remix contest for his "Turn Me Out" and released the top five mixes on the Turn Me Out EP in August 2012. The winning remix was submitted by Los Angeles electropop duo Father Tiger, who would later go on to co-write Lynn's single "Hologram" on his album, Tramp Stamps and Birthmarks. Turn Me Out was produced by Logan Lynn and released on his own label, Logan Lynn Music.

== Campaign ==
The cover art for Turn Me Out featured Lynn shirtless in his underwear, pants around his ankles, outside of a barn with a large necklace and snap-back raccoon face trucker hat on. There were other semi-nude images associated with this campaign, six in all, sent out to press and social media to draw attention to the graphic sexual content of the song and remixes.

== Track listing ==
Track listing for Turn Me Out
No.	Title	Length
1.	"Turn Me Out" (Father Tiger Remix)	3:20
2.	"Turn Me Out" (E39 Nyc Club Edit)	4:56
3.	"Turn Me Out" (Nicolas S. Remix)	5:43
4.	"Turn Me Out" (Joe Burns Remix)	6:30
5.	"Turn Me Out" (Modern Remix)	5:34
