= 1000× =

Single by Jarryd James featuring Broods

from the album High
- Released: 17 June 2016
- Recorded: 2016
- Genre: Alternative R&B; trip hop; dream pop
- Length: 4:00
- Label: Dryden Street, Universal Music Australia
- Songwriter: Jarryd James
- Producers: Jarryd James, Joel Little

Jarryd James singles chronology
"Sure Love" (2015)	"1000×" (2016)	"How Do We Make It" (2017)

Broods singles chronology
"Free" (2016)	"1000×" (2016)	"Heartlines" (2017)

"1000×" (pronounced "a thousand times") is a single by Australian singer-songwriter Jarryd James featuring New Zealand indie pop group, Broods. It was released on 17 June 2016.

== Background and recording ==
Speaking to Matt and Alex on Triple J in June 2016, James explained "It's the first song I wrote when I first started with working with Joel Little. He was still living in New Zealand... so I went over to Auckland and spent half a day and we came up with this song." James explained that he wasn't sure on the track and it was excluded from his album Thirty One. Broods vocalist Georgia Nott said; "I still remember the first time I heard Jarryd sing and I almost cried... I'm obsessed with love songs and got really attached to it and ended up walking down the aisle to the demo."

The two decided to get Nott to sing on it too and make it a 'duet' and her vocals were added in January 2016.

== Critical reception ==
Project U said: "I'm careful with the word 'perfect', but Jarryd James has made the year's finest ballad "

Thomas Bleach said: ""1000x" is a beautifully produced, moody ballad that perfectly allows Jarryd and Georgia's vocals to harmonise together making this one lush duet."

AAA Backstage said; ""1000x" is a lush love duet which merges Jarryd James’ velvety vocals with Broods’ soaring voice making for an utterly soul penetrating track. An atmospheric opening blends effortlessly into understated synth beats, flourishing into the chorus that pours just a little sunshine into the otherwise bittersweet theme. The duo’s spirited vocals and soaring harmonies plunge James’ blurred memoirs right into the present. It kind of makes you want to grab the person next to you and engage in a passionate kiss, with its swaying slow-paced rhythm and beautiful mixture of falsetto vocals."

== Track listing ==
One-track single

1. "1000X" – 4:33

Remixes single (14 October 2016)

1. "1000X" (Spectrasoul remix) – 3:29
2. "1000X" (Noah Breakfast remix) – 3:18

== Charts ==
Chart (2016)	Peak position
Australia (ARIA)	47
New Zealand Heatseekers (Recorded Music NZ)	3

== Release history ==
Country	Date	Format	Label
Australia	17 June 2016	Digital download	Dryden Street, Universal Music Australia
