= High (EP) =

EP by Jarryd James
- Released: 29 July 2016
- Length: 26:54
- Label: Dryden Street
- Producer: Stuart Stuart

Jarryd James chronology
Thirty One (2015)	High (2016)

Singles from High
- 1. "1000×" Released: 17 June 2016; 2. "How Do We Make It" Released: 17 March 2017

High is the second extended play (EP) by Australian alternative pop singer-songwriter and producer Jarryd James. The EP was released on 29 July 2016 and debuted and peaked at no. 40 on the ARIA Albums Chart.

James collaborated with many sought-after producers, including long-time collaborator Joel Little, Mikky Ekko, Tobias Jesso Jr and Andrew "Pop" Wansel.

Upon release of the EP, James explained his songwriting; "I tend to only focus on the melodies and whatever happens instrumentally is just what feels right. I also don't come in with words already written, I like to form lyrics, let them be informed by the vibe of the music."

James will promote the album in the United States throughout August and September 2016.

== Reception ==
Jessica Mule from Renowned for Sound gave the EP 4 stars out of 5, saying: "High simmers and stirs with its electro-R&B influence. Each of the six tracks on the EP stands on their own with its own emotional fingerprint."

AAA Backstage gave the EP 3.5 out of 5 saying' "Although edgy at times, the EP features a timbre that feels familiar yet somehow vague at the same time. The tracks attempt to showcase a variety of vibes and certainly do justice to James’ excellent, if not sometimes wispy, vocals. Arguably lacking in wow-power, the EP delivers a polished version of exactly what we expected. It’s all about a rhythmic simplicity that hones in on lyrical memos, which is by no means a bad thing."

== Track listing ==
CD and download
No.	Title	Writer(s)	Producer(s)	Length
1.	"1000x" (featuring Broods)	Jarryd James; Joel Little	Little	4:01
2.	"How Do We Make It"	James; Thomas Krell; Tobias Jesso Jr.	James; Little	4:24
3.	"Claim My Love"	James; John Stephen Sudduth	Mikky Ekko; James; Little	4:04
4.	"Burning Out"	James; Andrew "Pop" Wansel	Pop Wansel	4:45
5.	"Can't Help It"	James; Wansel; Steve Mostyn	Wansel; Mostyn	5:00
6.	"High"	James	James; Little	4:42

Streaming
No.	Title	Writer(s)	Producer(s)	Length
6.	"Give Me Something"	James; Little	Little	3:12
7.	"Do You Remember" (featuring Raury)	James; Little; Raury Tullis	Little	3:55
8.	"Sure Love"	James; Pip Norman	James; Norman; Little	3:39
9.	"This Time (Serious Symptoms, Simple Solutions)"	James; Little	Little	4:15
10.	"High"	James	James; Little	4:42

== Charts ==
Chart (2016)	Peak position
Australian Albums (ARIA)	40
Belgian Albums (Ultratop Flanders)	184
