= Welcome to the Monkey House (album) =

Studio album by The Dandy Warhols
- Released: May 5, 2003
- Recorded: September 11, 2001 – December 2, 2002
- Genre: New wave; synth-pop
- Length: 48:27
- Label: Capitol
- Producer: Courtney Taylor-Taylor; Nick Rhodes; Tony Visconti

The Dandy Warhols chronology
Thirteen Tales from Urban Bohemia (2000)	Welcome to the Monkey House (2003)	The Black Album/Come On Feel The Dandy Warhols (2004)

Singles from Welcome to the Monkey House
- 1. "We Used to Be Friends" Released: April 23, 2003; 2. "You Were the Last High" Released: July 28, 2003; 3. "Plan A" Released: November 24, 2003

Welcome to the Monkey House is the fourth studio album by American rock band The Dandy Warhols. The album was recorded between September 2001 and December 2002, and released on May 5, 2003, through record label Capitol.

The album was originally mixed by Grammy Award-winning soul music engineer Russell Elevado, but Capitol Records were unhappy with releasing it, instead opting for a more polished, synthpop-influenced mix by Nick Rhodes of Duran Duran. The original mix of the album was later released as The Dandy Warhols Are Sound in 2009.

The album's lead single "We Used to Be Friends" was the theme song to the popular TV series Veronica Mars as well as its subsequent film adaptation. Two further singles were released from the album: "You Were the Last High" and "Plan A".

== Background and recording ==
Welcome to the Monkey House was recorded between studios in Portland, Oregon, London and New York between September 11, 2001 and December 2, 2002.

The album features musical and production collaborations with Nick Rhodes, Tony Visconti, Nile Rodgers and Evan Dando.

== Content ==
The album's title was inspired by Kurt Vonnegut's short story of the same name.

The musical style of Welcome to the Monkey House was described by XRay Magazine as a "belligerent, snotty-nosed, speed-fueled romp through sinister electro punk, slightly corrupt melodic rock and skew-whiff handle of 80s glam-sodden pop, albeit refracted through a knowing noughties thrift store cool." Courtney Taylor-Taylor cited The Faint as a musical influence during the production of the album.

The album's cover features a painting by Ron English, and is a prime example of the artist's signature mash-up style, featuring a banana half-exposed by a zipper down its peel in a reference to the iconic Andy Warhol album covers for The Velvet Underground's The Velvet Underground & Nico and The Rolling Stones's Sticky Fingers.

=== Mix ===
The album was originally mixed by Grammy Award-winning soul music engineer Russell Elevado, but the band's label at the time, Capitol Records, were unhappy with releasing it, and instead released a more polished, new wave-inspired mix by Nick Rhodes of Duran Duran.

The Elevado mix was released as The Dandy Warhols Are Sound on the band's own Beat the World record label in 2009. In the same year, guitarist Peter Holmström stated the Nick Rhodes mix "was not the version I wanted released".

== Release ==
Three singles were released from the album: "We Used to Be Friends" on April 23, 2003, "You Were the Last High" on July 28, and "Plan A" on November 24. "We Used to Be Friends" went on to become the theme music for the popular TV series Veronica Mars and its subsequent film adaptation.

=== Reception ===
Professional ratings
Aggregate scores
Source	Rating
Metacritic	73/100
Review scores
Source	Rating
AllMusic	3/5 stars
The A.V. Club	favorable
Robert Christgau	A−
Drowned in Sound	4.5/5 stars
Entertainment Weekly	B
Kludge	6/10
Pitchfork	3.3/10
PopMatters	favorable
Q	4/5 stars
Uncut	4/5 stars

The album was generally well-received critically. AllMusic wrote, "With their fifth album [...] the band capitalizes on their pop sensibilities and even manages to turn their prior weaknesses into strengths, resulting in a collection of gloriously blank, cleverly stupid neo-new wave songs." Robert Christgau gave the album an A− rating, calling it "clever and droll but also hypnotic and mysterious".

A negative review came from Pitchfork, which gave the album a low 3.3/10 rating and wrote "these songs highlight the poseur mentality and insincerity that paradoxically plagues and blesses The Dandy Warhols". Sunday Herald wrote "Sometimes over-indulgence can be fun, but Welcome to the Monkey House is simply too much."

== Track listing ==
All tracks are written by Courtney Taylor-Taylor, except where noted.

No.	Title	Writer(s)	Alternate title	Length
1.	"Welcome to the Monkey House" (intro)			1:04
2.	"We Used to Be Friends"	Taylor-Taylor, Grant Nicholas, Bjorn Thorsrud		3:20
3.	"Plan A"			4:01
4.	"Wonderful You"		"The Dope (Wonderful You)"	4:37
5.	"Scientist"	Taylor-Taylor, David Bowie	"I Am a Scientist"	3:13
6.	"I Am Over It"			3:50
7.	"The Dandy Warhols Love Almost Everyone"			1:54
8.	"Insincere"		"Insincere Because I"	3:49
9.	"You Were the Last High"	Evan Dando, Taylor-Taylor	"The Last High"	4:46
10.	"Heavenly"			3:36
11.	"I Am Sound"			4:00
12.	"Rock Bottom"		"Hit Rock Bottom"	2:53
13.	"(You Come In) Burned"		"You Come In Burned"	7:24

The alternate titles listed above are the song titles as printed on the back cover, disc and in the liner notes of non-U.S. editions of the album, apart from "The Last High", which was the credited title of "You Were the Last High" on U.S. pressings (despite maintaining the full title when released as a single).

Enhanced CD content

The enhanced CD contains the short film The End of the Old as We Know It, written and directed by Courtney Taylor-Taylor, and a link to The Odditorium, a no-longer-active website where fans could "see band web casts, play games and download exclusive music and mayhem".

== Personnel ==
The Dandy Warhols

- Courtney Taylor-Taylor – lead vocals, guitar, production
- Peter Holmström – guitar
- Zia McCabe – keyboard bass, keyboards, bass guitar, backing vocals on "I Am Sound"
- Brent DeBoer – drums, backing vocals

Additional musicians

- Sally Boyden – backing vocals on "We Used to Be Friends"
- Sam Dodds – backing vocals on "We Used to Be Friends"
- Adam Flick – bass guitar on "Plan A" and "I Am Sound"
- Jamie Jackson – electric piano on "I Am Sound"
- Simon Le Bon – backing vocals on "Plan A"
- Yoad Nevo – additional guitar on "We Used to Be Friends", "Plan A", "Heavenly" and "I Am Sound"
- Parker Posey – mandolin on "I Am Sound"
- Nick Rhodes – additional synthesizer on tracks 2, 3 and 5–11
- Nile Rodgers – rhythm guitar on "I Am a Scientist"
- Cloudia Tinley – "giggles" on "We Used to Be Friends"
- Mark Tinley – additional guitar on "I Am Over It"
- Tony Visconti – bass guitar on "The Dope (Wonderful You)", bass guitar and backing vocals on "Hit Rock Bottom"

Production

- Steven Birch – album design
- Brian Coates – engineering on tracks 1–4 and 6–13
- Brian Gardner – mastering
- Ron English – album cover painting
- Nick Friend – recording assistance
- Yoad Nevo – additional programming on tracks 2, 3 and 5–11
- Daniel Porter – mixing assistance
- Nick Rhodes – production on tracks 2, 3 and 5–11
- Bjorn Thorsrud – engineering on tracks 2–7, 9, 10, 12 and 13, additional production on track 2
- Mark Tinley – engineering and programming on tracks 2, 3 and 5–11
- Tony Visconti – production on "Hit Rock Bottom"
- Jeremy Wheatley – mixing, additional production on tracks 2 and 9, additional programming on tracks 2, 3 and 5–11

== Charts ==
Chart performance for Welcome to the Monkey House
Chart (2003)	Peak position
Australian Albums (ARIA)	5
Australian DVD (ARIA)	1
Belgian Albums (Ultratop Flanders)	46
Belgian Albums (Ultratop Wallonia)	22
French Albums (SNEP)	62
German Albums (Offizielle Top 100)	75
Irish Albums (IRMA)	19
Italian Albums (FIMI)	69
New Zealand Albums (RMNZ)	31
Norwegian Albums (VG-lista)	3
Swiss Albums (Schweizer Hitparade)	83
UK Albums (OCC)	20
US Billboard 200	118
