= Glee music =

Glee music may refer to:

- Glee (music), an English type of song music
- Music from Glee (TV series), a U.S. TV series
  - List of songs in Glee (season 1)
  - List of songs in Glee (season 2)
  - List of songs in Glee (season 3)
  - List of songs in Glee (season 4)
  - List of songs in Glee (season 5)
  - List of songs in Glee (season 6)
  - Glee discography
- Glee (Bran Van 3000 album)
- Glee (Logan Lynn album)
