= Godless (song) =

2001 song by the Dandy Warhols

Single by the Dandy Warhols

from the album Thirteen Tales from Urban Bohemia
- Released: March 13, 2001
- Length: 5:23
- Label: Capitol
- Songwriter: Courtney Taylor-Taylor
- Producers: Dave Sardy; Courtney Taylor-Taylor; Gregg Williams

The Dandy Warhols singles chronology
"Bohemian Like You" (2000)	"Godless" (2001)	"We Used to Be Friends" (2003)

"Godless" is a song by American rock band the Dandy Warhols. It was released as the third single from their third studio album, Thirteen Tales from Urban Bohemia, on March 13, 2001.

== Release ==
"Godless" served as the third single from Thirteen Tales from Urban Bohemia. The song was serviced to US alternative radio on March 13, 2001, and was commercially released in the United Kingdom on June 25, 2001. It peaked at No. 66 on the UK Singles Chart.

== Reception ==
Q praised the song, calling it "a marvellous concoction of parping trumpets, blasted vocals and headtrip guitar swirls". Robert Christgau cited the track as a highlight of the album.

== Track listing ==
No.	Title	Length
1.	"Godless" (album version)	5:23
2.	"Godless" (Massive Attack mix)	3:46
3.	"Godless" (Massive Attack mix dub)	5:53
4.	"Godless" (Massive Attack mix instrumental)	3:43
5.	"Godless" (video)	5:23

== Charts ==
Weekly chart performance for "Godless"
Chart (2001)	Peak position
Netherlands (Single Top 100)	86
Scotland Singles (OCC)	84
UK Singles (OCC)	66

== Release history ==
Region	Date	Format(s)	Label(s)	Ref.
United States	March 13, 2001	Alternative radio	Capitol	
United Kingdom	June 25, 2001	12-inch vinyl; CD	Capitol	
