= Things Are Looking Up =

Things Are Looking Up may refer to:

== Television ==
- "Things Are Looking Up", an episode of Dragon (TV series) § Season 2 (2005)
- "Things Are Looking Up", an episode of Gerbert (TV series)
- Things Are Looking Up, a television film which was revised to create The Best Times (TV series)
- Things Are Looking Up (film), a 1935 British musical comedy

== Music ==
- "Things Are Looking Up", a Gershwin song from the 1937 film, A Damsel in Distress
- "Things Are Looking Up", a song from the Blues Traveler album Suzie Cracks the Whip
- "Things Are Looking Up", a song from Charley Pride's 10th Album
- "Things Are Looking Up", a song from Self Explanatory (Classified album)
- "Things Are Looking Up", a song from the Logan Lynn album I Killed Tomorrow Yesterday
- "Things Are Looking Up", a song from the Jennifer Paige album Positively Somewhere
- "Things Are Looking Up", a song from the Pieces of a Dream album Soul Intent
- "Things Are Looking Up", a music video from R5 discography
- Things Are Looking Up, from Paul Bacon (designer) § Discography
- Things Are Looking Up, from Pete Huttlinger § Discography
- Things Are Looking Up, a Juno Award for Best Jazz Album nominee by Moe Koffman

== Books ==
- Things Are Looking Up, one of the Sherman's Lagoon comic strip collections
- Things Are Looking Up... from Lynn Johnston bibliography § For Better or for Worse collections
