= Jarryd James =

Australian singer and record producer (born 1984)

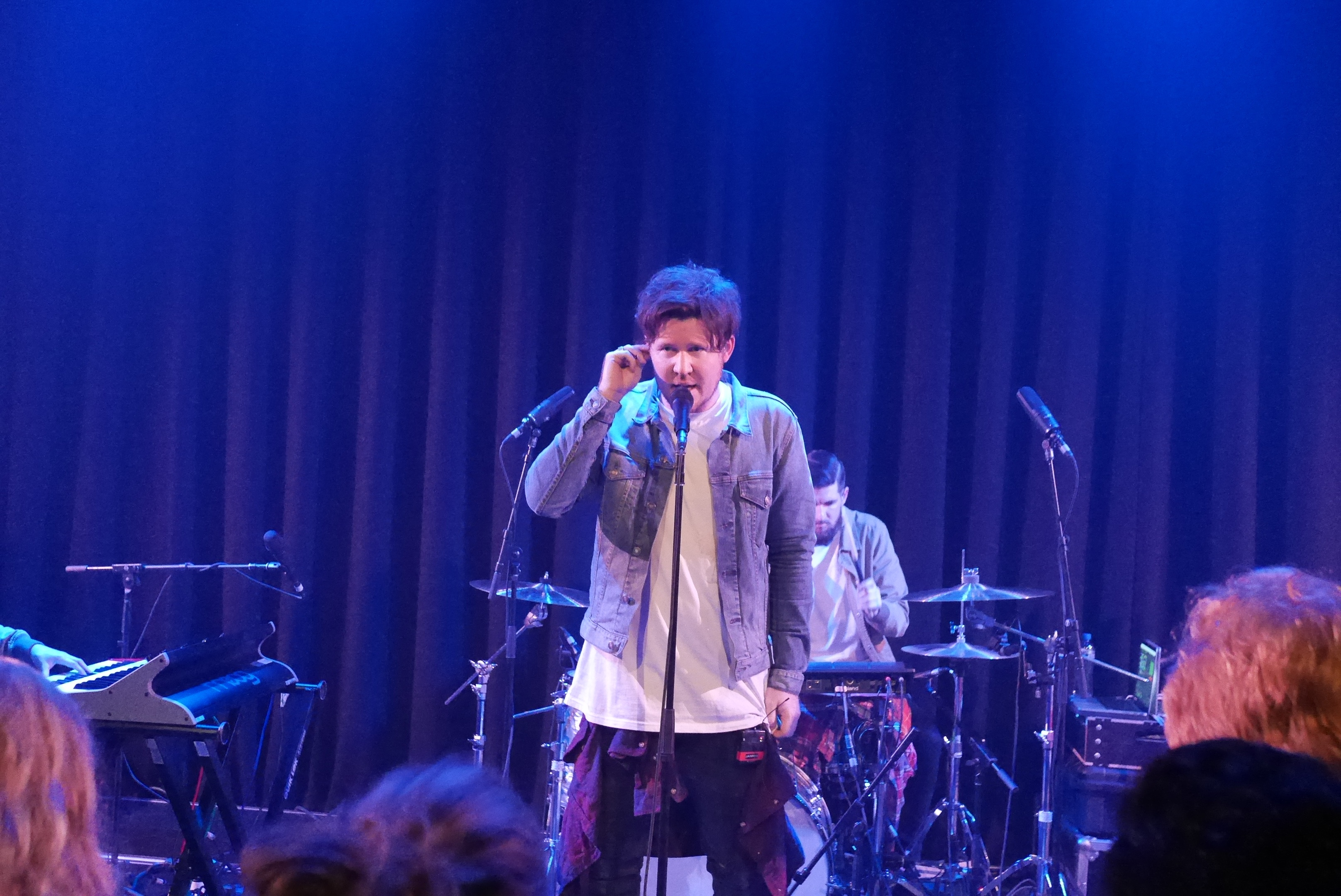
- James at Melkweg in 2015

Background information
- Born: Jarryd James Klapper; December 1984 (age 40–41); Brisbane, Queensland, Australia
- Genres: Alternative R&B; soul; indie pop; electropop; electronica
- Occupations: Singer; songwriter; record producer
- Instrument: Vocals
- Years active: 2012–present
- Labels: Jarryd James; Universal Australia

Jarryd James Klapper (born December 1984, in Brisbane) is an Australian singer, songwriter and record producer who performs as Jarryd James. He released his debut single "Do You Remember" on 30 January 2015, which peaked at No. 2 on the ARIA Singles Chart. His debut album, Thirty One, also reached No. 2 on the related ARIA Albums Chart. At the ARIA Music Awards of 2015, James won Best Pop Release for "Do You Remember".

== Career ==
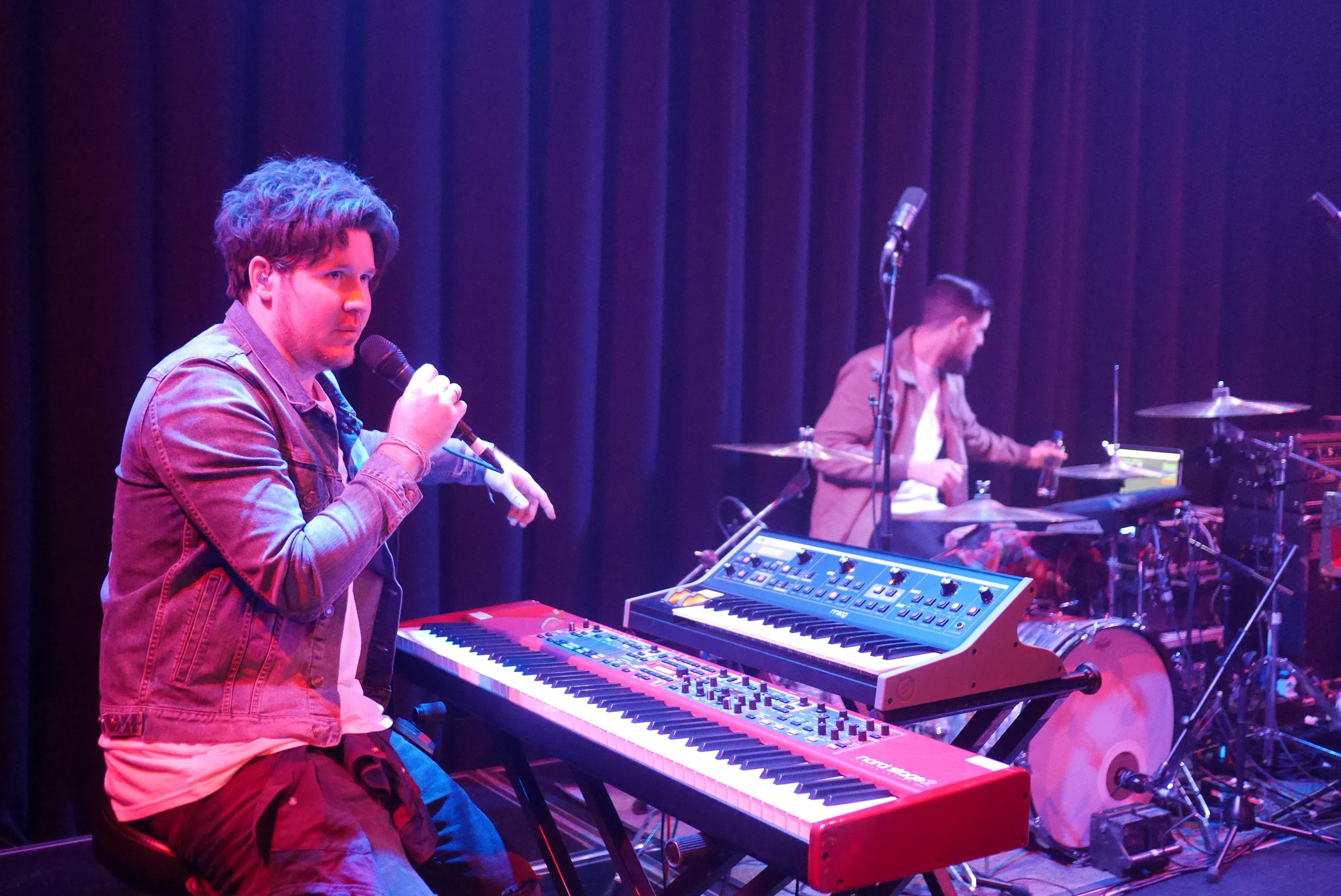
James (left) performing in 2015.

=== 2007–2018: Beginnings and Thirty One ===
Jarryd first enjoyed moderate success from playing guitar and singing in a band called Holland. They recorded a debut album that was never released for mysterious reasons. Jarryd claimed he was frustrated and that their album never arrived on store shelves due to 'management issues'. James quit making music around 2012 due to the issues surrounding the release of Holland's album.

James supported Broods on their late 2014 tour, and Angus & Julia Stone on their February 2015 tour. His breakthrough came in early 2015 when his debut solo single "Do You Remember" climbed the charts. His debut headline tour commenced in April 2015 in Melbourne, Sydney and Brisbane. After the debut headline tour sold out, another tour in larger venues was confirmed for July 2015.

On 24 July 2015, James announced the title of his debut studio album, Thirty One. It was released on 11 September 2015 and debuted at number 2 on the ARIA Albums Chart. In the United States, a shortened Extended Play was released, with the album "Thirty One" scheduled for a January 2016 release. At the ARIA Music Awards of 2015 James won Best Pop Release for "Do You Remember" and received four further nominations.

On 18 June 2016, James released the single "1000×" with New Zealand band, Broods. James supported Broods on their 2014 tour, and both have music produced by Joel Little. On 12 October 2018, James released his cover of Logan Lynn's "Nothing's Ever Wrong" as part of Lynn's multi-media double album My Movie Star, produced by Jay Mohr.

=== 2019–present: P.M. ===
In January 2019, James released "Slow Motion", the lead single from his second studio album, P.M., released on 22 January 2021.

== Discography ==
=== Studio albums ===
Title	Album details	Peak chart positions	
Title	Album details	AUS	NZ
Thirty One	Release date: 11 September 2015; Label: Dryden Street; Formats: CD, digital download	2	28
P.M.	Release date: 22 January 2021; Label: Dryden Street; Formats: CD, digital download, streaming	—	—

=== Extended plays ===
Title	Album details	Peak chart positions	
Title	Album details	AUS	BEL (FL)
Jarryd James	Release date: 3 September 2015 (US); Label: Interscope; Format: Digital download	—	—
High	Release date: 29 July 2016 (AUS); Label: Dryden Street; Format: Digital download	40	184

=== Singles ===
==== As lead artist ====
Title	Year	Peak chart positions					Certifications	Album
Title	Year	AUS	AUS Indie	BEL (WA)	GER	NZ	Certifications	Album
"Do You Remember"	2015	2	1	33	78	7	ARIA: 4× Platinum; RMNZ: 2× Platinum	Thirty One
"Give Me Something"	2015	59	5	—	—	—	ARIA: Platinum	Thirty One
"Regardless" (featuring Julia Stone)	2015	48	—	—	—	—	ARIA: Gold	Thirty One
"Sure Love"	2015	—	—	—	—	—		Thirty One
"1000×" (featuring Broods)	2016	47	—	—	—	— (Note: "1000×" did not enter the NZ Top 40 Singles Chart, but peaked at number 3 on the NZ Heatseekers Chart.)		High
"How Do We Make It"	2017	—	—	—	—	—		High
"Slow Motion"	2019	—	—	—	—	—		P.M.
"Let It Go"	2019	—	—	—	—	—		P.M.
"Problems"	2020	—	—	—	—	—		P.M.
"Miracles"	2020	—	—	—	—	—		P.M.
"Overdue" (featuring Trapo)	2021	—	—	—	—	—		P.M.
"—" denotes a recording that did not chart or was not released in that territory.

==== As featured artist ====
Title	Year	Album
"Make Me Feel" (Fizzy Milk featuring Jarryd James)	2018	Non-album single

== Awards and nominations ==
=== APRA Awards ===
The APRA Awards are presented annually from 1982 by the Australasian Performing Right Association (APRA), "honouring composers and songwriters".

Year	Nominee / work	Award	Result
2016	himself	Breakthrough Songwriter of the Year	Nominated
2016	"Do You Remember?"	Most Played Australian Work	Nominated
2016	"Do You Remember?"	Pop Work of the Year	Won
2016	"Do You Remember?"	Song of the Year	Nominated

=== ARIA Music Awards ===
The ARIA Music Awards is an annual awards ceremony that recognises excellence, innovation, and achievement across all genres of Australian music. James has won one award from seven nominations.

Year	Nominee / work	Award	Result
2015	"Do You Remember?"	Best Male Artist	Nominated
2015	"Do You Remember?"	Best Independent Release	Nominated
2015	"Do You Remember?"	Best Pop Release	Won
2015	"Do You Remember?"	Song of the Year	Nominated
2015	"Do You Remember?"	Breakthrough Artist - Release	Nominated
2016	Thirty One	Best Independent Release	Nominated
2016	Thirty One	Best Adult Alternative Album	Nominated

=== J Awards ===
The J Awards are an annual series of Australian music awards that were established by the Australian Broadcasting Corporation's youth-focused radio station Triple J. They commenced in 2005.

Year	Nominee / work	Award	Result
2015	Thirty One	Australian Album of the Year	Nominated

=== Queensland Music Awards ===
The Queensland Music Awards (previously known as Q Song Awards) are annual awards celebrating Queensland, Australia's brightest emerging artists and established legends. They commenced in 2006.

Year	Nominee / work	Award	Result (wins only)
2016	"Do You Remember"	Highest Selling Single	Won
2017	himself	The BOQ People's Choice Award for Most Popular Male Artist	Won
