= Disney Princess: Magical Jewels =

2007 action-adventure video game

- Developer: 1st Playable Productions
- Publisher: Disney Interactive Studios
- Director: Tobi Saulnier
- Producer: Zhenelle Fish
- Designer: Jeb Havens
- Programmer: Brenden Conte
- Artist: Elizabeth McLaren
- Composer: Bart Roijmans
- Platform: Nintendo DS
- Release: October 16, 2007
- Genre: Action-adventure game
- Modes: Single-player, multiplayer

Disney Princess: Magical Jewels is a video game in the Disney Princess franchise that was developed by 1st Playable Productions and released by Disney Interactive Studios for Nintendo DS in 2007. It is designed as a 2D puzzle action-adventure and features the six original Disney Princesses: Snow White, Cinderella, Aurora, and Belle are in the main game, while Ariel and Jasmine are playable in minigames.

== Plot ==
An evil Queen has seized the Magical Jewels of the Kingdom of Kindness and destroyed the Golden Castle. To restore peace, Aurora, Belle, Cinderella, and Snow White team up to reclaim the Magical Jewels, defeat the Queen's minions and banish her from the kingdom for good.

== Reception ==
Lucas M. Thomas of IGN gave the game a score of 6.5/10, calling it a "title that does a good job of visually presenting its worlds and characters and offering a lot of ground to cover, but gaining its multiple hours of gameplay primarily through repetition of the same core concept, again and again, with little variation along the way".
