= Dance Alone (EP) =

EP / Remix album by Logan Lynn
- Released: 2013
- Recorded: 2013
- Genre: Electropop, dance, remix
- Label: Logan Lynn Music
- Producer: Logan Lynn

Logan Lynn chronology
Tramp Stamps and Birthmarks (2012)	Dance Alone (2013)	'Adieu.' (2016)

Dance Alone is a five-song EP released by Logan Lynn on May 7, 2013 on his label, Logan Lynn Music.

== Remixes ==
In the spring of 2013, Logan Lynn held a public remix contest for his single "Hologram," and on May 7, 2013, he released a second 5-song remix EP called Dance Alone, which featured the winners. The EP was produced by Logan Lynn and was released on his label, Logan Lynn Music.

== Track listing ==
No.	Title	Length
1.	"Hologram (BeeYizz Remix)"	3:42
2.	"Hologram (XL Remix)"	3:40
3.	"Hologram (Adroit Remix)"	3;32
4.	"Hologram (Dubnium105 Remix)"	3:20
5.	"Hologram (Mozi Remix)"	3:52
