= From Pillar to Post =

Studio album by Logan Lynn
- Released: November 24, 2009
- Recorded: 2007–2009
- Genre: Electropop
- Label: Beat the World Records; Caroline Records; EMI; Logan Lynn Music
- Producer: Carlos Cortes

Logan Lynn chronology
Feed Me to the Wolves (2007)	From Pillar to Post (2009)	The Last High (2010)

From Pillar to Post was the first official release by Logan Lynn from Beat the World Records, a Caroline Records / EMI 3rd party label and was Lynn's first record to be released on a major label. A special pre-release and digital release was issued from Beat the World on September 4, 2009. This was followed by a physical release in selected stores, as well as a debut on iTunes, on November 24, 2009. The mass release in all stores nationwide happened in February 2010.

== Digital Release (2009) ==
The album's title, From Pillar To Post, was borrowed from an expression that was commonly used by his maternal grandmother. Lynn released a video for "Write It On My Left Arm" in August 2009.

On November 23, 2009, Logan Lynn released a music video for his new single, "Bottom Your Way to the Top".

"From Pillar to Post" was named Album of the Year by multiple media outlets in 2009, including The Deli, Indie Rock Cafe, Oregon Music News, MondoSonoro (Spain), GO Magazine, Just Out Portland and others.

== Physical Release (2010) ==
The widespread physical release date for "From Pillar To Post", for all stores nationwide and select stores internationally, happened via Caroline Records/EMI in February 2010, alongside an international digital release.

== Track listing ==
No.	Title	Length
1.	"Feed Me To The Wolves"	4:26
2.	"Alone Together"	4:07
3.	"If He Hollers"	3:25
4.	"Prey on the Power"	0:44
5.	"Bottom Your Way to the Top"	4:18
6.	"Write It on My Left Arm"	4:21
7.	"Burning Your Glory (Album Version)"	6:08
8.	"Aftermath"	2:48
9.	"I Have to Do It"	0:45
10.	"Bleed Him Out"	3:56
11.	"You Win the War"	3:11
12.	"To Bed, Up the Wooden Mountain"	0:50
13.	"The Dotted Line"	3:34

== Release history ==
Country	Date
United States & Worldwide (digital & physical pre-release)	September 4, 2009
United States & Europe (selected in-store/iTunes release)	November 24, 2009
United States (full in-store/iTunes release via Caroline Records)	February 9, 2010
Worldwide (selected in-store/iTunes release via Caroline Records)	February 9, 2010
