= Thirteen Tales from Urban Bohemia =

Studio album by The Dandy Warhols
- Released: June 12, 2000
- Recorded: December 1998 – March 1999
- Genres: Alternative rock; power pop; space rock
- Length: 56:07
- Label: Capitol
- Producers: Courtney Taylor-Taylor; Dave Sardy; Gregg Williams

The Dandy Warhols chronology
...The Dandy Warhols Come Down (1997)	Thirteen Tales from Urban Bohemia (2000)	Welcome to the Monkey House (2003)

Singles from Thirteen Tales from Urban Bohemia
- 1. "Get Off" Released: May 2000; 2. "Bohemian Like You" Released: July 2000; 3. "Godless" Released: July 17, 2001; 4. "Horse Pills" Released: 2001 (Australia only)

Thirteen Tales from Urban Bohemia is the third album by American rock band The Dandy Warhols, released on June 12, 2000, through record label Capitol.

It is considered their breakthrough album, largely owing to the song "Bohemian Like You" being featured in a notable Vodafone advertisement. Four singles were released from the album: "Get Off", "Bohemian Like You", "Godless" and "Horse Pills" (the last in Australia only).

This is the band's first album to feature their new drummer Brent DeBoer, Taylor-Taylor's cousin, who joined the band following the departure of their original drummer Eric Hedford, during the tour of their previous studio album.

== Background and recording ==
Recording of the album commenced in December 1998 and concluded in March 1999. On the making of the album, frontman Courtney Taylor-Taylor said that "we felt like we needed to make the last classic rock album. A record that would be, sonically, shaped somewhere in-between All Things Must Pass and Workingman's Dead."

== Release ==
The album's first single, "Get Off", was released in May 2000.

Thirteen Tales from Urban Bohemia was released in June 2000 by record label Capitol. It is considered their breakthrough album due to the success of the album's second single "Bohemian Like You", released in August, which reached number 5 in the UK, despite the album only reaching number 182 in the US Billboard 200. It reached number 32 in the UK Albums Chart. A special edition of the album, titled Seven Tales for Urban Australia, was released at the band's Australian tour, containing a bonus disc of seven extra tracks.

Two further singles were released: "Godless", on July 17, 2001, and "Horse Pills" the same year, released in Australia only.

By 2003 the album had sold over 200,000 copies in the UK alone.

In 2013, a remastered version of the album called the 13th Anniversary Edition was released, featuring a bonus disc of previously unreleased material.

== Reception ==
Professional ratings
Aggregate scores
Source	Rating
Metacritic	80/100
Review scores
Source	Rating
AllMusic	4/5 stars
Alternative Press	4/5
The Austin Chronicle	4/5 stars
Chicago Sun-Times	3.5/4 stars
Entertainment Weekly	B
NME	7/10
Q	4/5 stars
Rolling Stone	3/5 stars
The Rolling Stone Album Guide	4/5 stars
USA Today	3/4 stars

Thirteen Tales from Urban Bohemia was well received by critics and holds a score of 80 out of 100 on the review aggregate site Metacritic, indicating "generally favorable reviews". Keith Phipps of The A.V. Club called the album "an 800-pound gorilla of winning, eclectic rock 'n' roll" and wrote that it "may be the most joyous, instantly likable rock record you'll hear this year." Heather Phares of AllMusic called it a "bakers' dozen of their most focused and cohesive songs". Alternative Press called it "a scattershot bagful of wild rides and demented ditties and an album of maniacal depth and vision."

The Phoenix New Times's Brian Baker wrote, "Thirteen Tales from Urban Bohemia is astonishing in its maturity and vision, coming from a band that is so young and so purposefully aimless." The Portland Mercury wrote, "while previous efforts have been somewhat schizophrenic in their ping-ponging between over-the-top atmosphere and dumbass pop, The Dandy Warhols' third record brings everything together in one tight package." Robert Christgau of The Village Voice gave the album a two-star honorable rating and remarked: "Dandies have feelings too—no, strike that, tunes too."

== Track listing ==
All tracks are written by Courtney Taylor-Taylor, except as noted.

No.	Title	Writer(s)	Length
1.	"Godless"		5:20
2.	"Mohammed"		5:20
3.	"Nietzsche"		5:40
4.	"Country Leaver"		3:22
5.	"Solid"		3:08
6.	"Horse Pills"		3:24
7.	"Get Off"		3:10
8.	"Sleep"		5:58
9.	"Cool Scene"		4:08
10.	"Bohemian Like You"		3:30
11.	"Shakin'"		3:56
12.	"Big Indian"		3:34
13.	"The Gospel"	Taylor-Taylor, Peter Holmström	5:35

Limited edition bonus CD
No.	Title	Length
1.	"White Gold"
2.	"Phone Call"
3.	"Not If You Were the Last Junkie on Earth" (live at the Reading Festival – 1999)
4.	"I Love You" (live at the Reading Festival – 1999)

Bonus disc: Seven Tales for Urban Australia
No.	Title	Writer(s)	Length
1.	"Hells Bells" (AC/DC cover)	Angus Young, Malcolm Young, Brian Johnson	5:58
2.	"Bohemian Like You" (The Black Dog Lithium Carbonate 300mg Mix)		4:41
3.	"Dub Song"		6:31
4.	"Boys Better"		4:32
5.	"Not If You Were the Last Junkie on Earth (Heroin Is So Passe)" (live)		3:07
6.	"Get Off" (video)
7.	"Bohemian Like You" (video)

13th anniversary edition bonus disc
No.	Title	Length
1.	"Later the Show"
2.	"Ras Tafar and I"
3.	"Godless" (alt. vox melody)
4.	"Cool Scene" (early mix)
5.	"Country Leaver" (early mix)
6.	"Bohemian Like You" (Courtney home demo)
7.	"Mohammed" (Courtney home demo)
8.	"Big Indian" (Courtney cassette 4-track)
9.	"Big Indian" (Courtney home demo)
10.	"Unknown"
11.	"Godless" (Courtney home demo)
12.	"Cool Scene" (Courtney home demo)
13.	"Dub Song" (Courtney home demo)

== Personnel ==
The Dandy Warhols

- Courtney Taylor-Taylor – lead vocals, guitar, production (tracks 1–6, 8, 9, 11–13), mixing ("Not If You Were the Last Junkie on Earth (Heroin Is So Passe) (Live)")
- Peter Holmström – guitar, six-string bass ("Godless")
- Zia McCabe – keyboard bass, keyboards, bass guitar, tambourine
- Brent DeBoer – drums, backing vocals, album cover photography

Additional personnel

- Phil Baker – double bass ("Country Leaver", "Sleep")
- Meg Bobbitt – additional vocals ("Shakin'", "The Gospel")
- Vince DiFiore – trumpet ("Mohammed")
- Erik Gavriluk – organ ("Bohemian Like You")
- Joe Kaczmarek – organ ("Cool Scene")
- Eric Matthews – trumpet ("Godless", "Cool Scene")
- Anton Newcombe – guitar ("Get Off")
- Troy Stewart – slide guitar
- D.J. Swamp – scratching ("Shakin'")

== Charts ==
Chart (2000–2002)	Peak position
Australian Albums (ARIA)	25
Canada Top Albums/CDs (RPM)	24
Dutch Albums (Album Top 100)	70
Irish Albums (IRMA)	22
Italian Albums (FIMI)	31
New Zealand Albums (RMNZ)	37
Norwegian Albums (VG-lista)	18
UK Albums (Official Charts)	32
US Billboard 200	182

== Certifications ==
Region	Certification	Certified units/sales
United Kingdom (BPI)	Gold	100,000^{^}
^{^} Shipments figures based on certification alone.
