= My Movie Star =

Studio album by Logan Lynn
- Released: October 12, 2018
- Recorded: 2017
- Studio: The Hallowed Halls
- Genres: Indie Pop, Piano
- Length: 70 minutes
- Label: Logan Lynn Music / Mohr Media
- Producers: Logan Lynn and Jay Mohr

Logan Lynn chronology
'Adieu.' (2016)	My Movie Star (2018)

My Movie Star is a 20-song, 2-disc double album released by Logan Lynn and Jay Mohr on October 12, 2018.

== Album ==
In March 2017, Logan Lynn appeared on an hour-long episode of actor and comedian Jay Mohr's Mohr Stories podcast. Lynn and Mohr discussed music, addiction recovery, overcoming childhood trauma, and mental health at length, as well as a forthcoming Logan Lynn album that was inspired by Mohr.

In September 2017, Paste Magazine broke the news that Lynn and Mohr had completed the record, titled My Movie Star, which was co-Produced by the two, and that Lynn would be working with T-Pain muse GLASYS in the studio. It was also announced that the album would feature collaborations between Logan Lynn and 80s pop star Tiffany, The Dandy Warhols, Jarryd James, DoublePlusGood, Stose, Rian Lewis and others.

On July 12, 2018 Billboard magazine included the pre-order for "My Movie Star" in an exclusive feature story about Logan Lynn going on tour to promote mental health advocacy.

On October 12, 2018 Logan Lynn's 9th studio album was released. In a review of the record, Billboard said "For nearly 20 years, dance-pop artist Logan Lynn has made a career out of crafting catchy, disorderly songs that almost all include big beats, fun melodies and cheeky lyrics. But on his latest album, My Movie Star, Lynn has traded in his signature sound for a more somber, melancholy tone — a dynamic new album consisting of Lynn's new piano-driven songs and filled with remixes and covers by other industry greats."

== Music videos ==
In February 2018, Logan Lynn and Jay Mohr released the "My Movie Star" featurette, which made its exclusive premiere on BuzzBands LA. The short film featured three previously unreleased songs from the album. Lynn credits Jay Mohr with inspiring the album, on which Mohr is a producer and co-writer.

On August 2, 2018 Earbuddy hosted the exclusive premiere of Logan Lynn and Rian Lewis' "Underground" music video. The short film was produced by Lynn and Jay Mohr and is a stop-motion animation piece created by LAIKA Studios-trained animator Adam Taylor.

Logan Lynn and Jay Mohr released two versions of the music video for "Nothing's Ever Wrong" on September 10, 2018 via Self-Titled Magazine. Starring Mohr, the video was written and directed by Lynn himself. The NC-17 Director's Cut featured full frontal nudity. The R-rated version featured backside nudity only. This is the first time Mohr had appeared fully nude in a film. In an interview with Self-Titled that ran alongside the premiere, Jay is quoted as saying "Logan Lynn is a loving artist. He knows he has doors to open that we can't close, so in 'Nothing's Ever Wrong' he leaves out everything but what's there. The big change to the minor chords when he sings 'cause it's not my life'.... It shook me. I mean driving-and-crying shook me. It's so beautiful. Indescribably beautiful, but it's ominous for me... foreboding. Like if he goes any further it will break your heart; a door that can never be closed if he opens it."

The day the album was released, Logan Lynn also released the music video for "This Time I Lost It All", which he directed himself. On October 31, Lynn released the "Beside You" music video, also self-directed, in which he shaves his beard on camera.

== Track listing ==
The tracks are:

SIDE A
No.	Title	Length
1.	"Nothing's Ever Wrong"	4:19
2.	"My Movie Star"	3:09
3.	"Big City Now"	2:58
4.	"Like Before"	4:23
5.	"This Time I Lost It All"	4:03
6.	"You're Mine Because I Love You"	3:29
7.	"Beside You"	3:48
8.	"Darling"	3:51
9.	"Underground"	3:22
10.	"The End The End The End"	4:31

SIDE B
No.	Title	Length
1.	"Underground (Rian Lewis Remix)"	3:25
2.	"Like Before (The Dandy Warhols Remix)"	2:51
3.	"The End The End The End (STOSE Cover)"	4:14
4.	"Nothing's Ever Wrong (Jarryd James Cover)"	3:49
5.	"Big City Now (Tiffany Cover)"	2:58
6.	"Nothing's Ever Wrong (DoublePlusGood Cover)"	3:42
7.	"Big City Now (Scott Simpson Cover)"	3:02
8.	"You're Mine Because I Love You (Madison Montgomery Cover)"	3:22
9.	"My Movie Star (Aaron David Gleason Cover)"	3:09
10.	"Underground (Scott Simpson Cover)"	4:29
