= Jeb Havens =

American singer-songwriter

Jeb Havens (born 1981) is an american game designer, video game developer, industry activist and singer-songwriter. He has worked for companies such as Cyberlore, Electronic Arts (EA), and Google, and is known for his work in video games such as Playboy: The Mansion, Disney Princess: Magical Jewels, and the Spore series. Havens designed several party games throughout his career, including the 2021 board game Uk'otoa published by Darrington Press. As a recording artist, Havens released his debut album in 2016.

Noted as one of the few prominent openly gay professionals in the video game industry, Havens promoted and contributed to public discussions about LGBTQ issues within the industry during the 2000s.

== Life and career ==
Havens began working as a professional designer for video games and software in 2003. Havens served as the lead designer for the Private Party expansion pack for the 2005 video game Playboy: The Mansion published by Cyberlore. Under his leadership, the development team introduced additional features like organizing theme parties and new customization options for the player's Playboy mansion. While the base game's animations were gender-specific and lacked the ability to depict same-sex romantic interactions like partner dances between male characters, Havens pushed for the inclusion of content which would allow players to simulate gameplay interactions coded as LGBTQ in theme; he believed that it would be "philosophically" appropriate for the Playboy license and the company to allow players to experience living a "larger variety of fantasies".

By 2006, Havens moved onto 1st Playable Productions, a company which specialized in educational video games, where he worked as lead designer on the 2007 video game Disney Princess: Magical Jewels. Havens later worked for the EA division Maxis as an associate designer on the 2008 video game Spore as well as its spin-off title Spore Creatures. Havens worked for Google during the early 2010s; as YouTube Product Manager, he was involved in the development and redesign of the online video sharing and social media platform YouTube as "YouTube One Channel". On March 7, 2013, Havens announced its open access to the public on the YouTube Official Blog, and that it was ready for all channels to upgrade to the new YouTube One Channel design as an option.

Havens designed a number of party games throughout his career, such as the 2007 board game Mother Sheep published by Playroom Entertainment, the 2010 tile-laying game Burrows published by Z-Man Games, and the 2018 card game You Don't Know My Life! (YDKML) which he co-developed with journalist Dennis Hensley. Havens developed the concept of Escape Jam, where participants team up to design and test a 25-minute escape room in one day, in a manner similar to a typical game jam session. Havens created and designed the 2021 board game Uk'otoa, the first official game published by Darrington Press, the board and card game imprint of the web series Critical Role.

As a musician, Havens is a recording artist who also performs in live music venues. Haven's collaborators for his musical pursuits include Tom Goss, and Matt Zarley. Havens is a featured artist in the 2012 charity compilation record Comp 175: A Benefit for Queer Programs and Services in the Pacific Northwest. In February 2016, Jeb released an album titled HOME BASE, produced by Andy Zulla. Havens contributed to the score of a 2019 Broadway musical play about the life of Harvey Milk. Havens uploaded videos of himself performing inside his closet on his personal YouTube channel as part of a themed series.

=== Activism ===
Havens is noted for his efforts to promote the increased discussion of LGBT themes in video games and within the video game industry as a whole during the 2000s. Havens was motivated to raise awareness about the importance of diversity in video games after attending the Game Developers Conference (GDC) event in San Francisco in March 2005, where he noticed that there was no discussion or mention of any LGBT themes or content throughout the event, and that there were no developers who had come forward to publicly discuss their experiences as non-heterosexual individuals or how it inform their work. Havens said that he had always been openly gay at his workplaces and that the companies he had worked for are "very gay-friendly".

During the 2000s, Havens was an interviewee for multiple media outlets about his experiences as an openly-gay public figure in the video game industry as well as his views on the presentation of LGBTQ content, such as The Advocate, ABC News, Gamasutra, and Spike TV. In March 2006, Havens organized the first LGBTQ round table discussion at the GDC event held in San Jose, California, which was intended to be an inclusive discussion for people of all sexual orientations in the video game industry, including designers and programmers, as well as enthusiasts from the general public. Havens served as the moderator for a forum discussion entitled "Integrating the Adult & Game Markets" at Sex in Video Games Conference held in June 2006. During the second LGBTQ round table discussion in 2007 initiated by Havens, panelists discussed the gradual acceptance of LGBTQ content in video games by both the industry and the public. By 2009, Havens served as chairman of a committee within industry group International Game Developers Association which focused on advancing lesbian, gay, bisexual, and transgender representation in video games.

=== Recognition ===
Writing for Gamasutra in 2007, Bryan Ochalla named Havens the "gay face" of the games industry. In June 2008, Havens was announced as the winner of the "Best Gay Gaming Industry Professional" award at the inaugural NewNowNext Awards presented by Logo TV in 2008.
