= Regardless (Jarryd James song) =

Single by Jarryd James featuring Julia Stone

from the album Thirty One
- Released: 4 August 2015
- Recorded: 2015
- Genre: Indie pop; pop
- Length: 4:33
- Label: Dryden Street, Universal Music Australia
- Songwriter(s): Jarryd James; Julia Stone
- Producer(s): Jarryd James, Joel Little

Jarryd James singles chronology
| "Give Me Something" (2015) | "Regardless" (2015) | "Sure Love" (2015) |

Julia Stone singles chronology
| "I Was Only 19" (2012) | "Regardless" (2015) | "Solid Gold" (2017) |

"Regardless" is a single by the Australian singer-songwriter Jarryd James featuring Julia Stone (of Angus & Julia Stone). It was released on August 4, 2015 and is the third single taken from James' debut studio album, Thirty One.

The song was written by James and Stone in a single day and was co-produced by Joel Little who had worked on James’ previous singles, "Give Me Something" and "Do You Remember".

"Regardless" peaked at number 48 on the ARIA Singles Chart. with a frost remixed being released in November 2015.

== Reviews ==
Aidan Hogg of The AU Review complimented James' "beautiful falsetto", adding "This song is led by a killer bass riff, and grows the further into the song you get; with hints of soul, electronica and folk its hard to pinpoint the genre of this track."

Kellie Comer of Speaker TV said; "The duo's contrasting vocals complement a deep bass line on the track. Their tones work so well together: James' soulful voice has found the perfect union in Stone's softer tone."

== Track listing ==
1-track single

1. "Regardless" – 4:33

remix single

1. "Regardless" (Frost Remix) - 6:31

== Charts ==
| Chart (2015) | Peak position |
|---|---|
| Australia (ARIA) | 48 |

== Certifications ==
| Region | Certification | Certified units/sales |
|---|---|---|
| Australia (ARIA) | Gold | 35,000^{‡} |
^{‡} Sales+streaming figures based on certification alone.

== Release history ==
| Country | Date | Format | Label |
|---|---|---|---|
| Australia | 4 August 2015 | Digital download | Dryden Street, Universal Music Australia |
