= Glee (Logan Lynn album) =

GLEE

Studio album by Logan Lynn
- Released: 1999
- Recorded: 1998
- Genre: Electropop
- Label: Logan Lynn Music
- Producer: PFog

Logan Lynn chronology
This Is Folk Techno/Pull The Plug (1998)	GLEE (1999)	Logan Lynn (2006)

GLEE is the first full-length album originally released by Logan Lynn in 1999. Lynn re-released the record in 2005 on his own label, Logan Lynn Music, followed by a 2008 re-release on Beat the World Records.

== Debut Record ==
In 1998, Logan Lynn was granted a studio pass to create his first full-length album, GLEE, which was produced by Portland indie producer PFog and released on October 15, 1999.

== Music video ==
Lynn's first music video was made for the "Here We Go Again" single, shot and directed by Bryan White and Chris Tucker, and produced by Logan Lynn Music. The video featured scenes with Lynn singing spliced with home movies of Lynn as a child and stop-motion animation.

== Original Track listing ==
No.	Title	Length
1.	"Intro"	0:16
2.	"Smoke and Barlight"	5:00
3.	"Panic"	3:52
4.	"Meat"	4:40
5.	"The Mothership"	5:12
6.	"Burning Your Glory"	4:15
7.	"Here We Go Again"	5:44
8.	"The End of the Scene"	4:55
9.	"You Think Like a Man"	4:31
10.	"Menthol"	4:22
11.	"Licking the Walls"	3:25
12.	"Digging"	3:53
13.	"Like Clockwork"	4:06
14.	"Pills with Smiling Faces"	4:49
15.	"Still Pretending"	4:17
16.	"Another Day's End"	5:16
17.	"On Our Way to Outer Space"	3:50

== Re-Release Track listing ==
No.	Title	Length
1.	"Smoke and Barlight"	5:00
2.	"Panic"	3:52
3.	"Meat"	4:40
4.	"The Mothership"	5:12
5.	"Burning Your Glory"	4:15
6.	"Here We Go Again"	5:44
7.	"The End of the Scene"	4:55
8.	"You Think Like a Man"	4:31
9.	"Licking the Walls"	3:25
10.	"Digging"	3:53
11.	"Like Clockwork"	4:06
12.	"Pills with Smiling Faces"	4:49
13.	"Still Pretending"	4:17
14.	"Another Day's End"	5:16
15.	"On Our Way to Outer Space"	3:50
