= Everything You Touch Turns to Gold =

Everything You Touch Turns To Gold

EP by Logan Lynn
- Released: 2011
- Recorded: 2011
- Genre: Electropop
- Label: Logan Lynn Music
- Producer: Logan Lynn

Logan Lynn chronology
Blood in the Water (album) (2011)	Everything You Touch Turns To Gold (2011)	Turn Me Out (single) (2012)

Everything You Touch Turns To Gold is an acoustic EP of new music released by Logan Lynn on December 6, 2011.

== Digital release ==
The Everything You Touch Turns To Gold acoustic EP featured five previously unreleased songs, co-written by Logan Lynn and Noah Daniel Wood, recorded by David Appaloosa and produced by Logan Lynn. The EP was self-released on Lynn's label, Logan Lynn Music, and was a departure from the electropop sound Lynn had become known for up to that point. The EP featured Logan Lynn's lyrics and vocals over Noah Daniel Wood's soft, acoustic guitar accompaniment. In an article from January 2012 on The Huffington Post, Lynn is quoted as saying, "Love has made a home in my life and songs these days, shining new light on old wounds, bringing with it new words and melodies" in a paragraph which links to the EP.

In December 2012 Lynn re-released the title track, "Everything You Touch Turns To Gold", on his full-length album, "Tramp Stamps and Birthmarks". The new version of the song was marked "Album Version" in the title and was rearranged to feature Logan Lynn and Rowan Wren in a duet of the original, with instrumentation added by Producer Gino Mari.

== Music video ==
A music video for the album version of "Everything You Touch Turns To Gold" was released in August 2013. The video was produced by Logan Lynn Music and directed by Rowan Wren, who also sings lead vocals on the song, and featured Lynn and Wren in a variety of scenes with metal sculpture work by Portland artist Christopher Truax. The video premiered on Out Magazine's website and was picked up by The Huffington Post and other media from there.

== Track listing ==
No.	Title	Length
1.	"Laying Still (Acoustic)"	2:10
2.	"Heaven or Hell (Acoustic)"	2:26
3.	"The Tree You Named After Me (Acoustic)"	2:22
4.	"Everything You Touch Turns To Gold (Acoustic)"	2:33
5.	"We Were Around Before (A cappella)"	1:16
6.	"That Scent of Boyhood (Acoustic)"	1:31
