= Logan Lynn (album) =

Studio album by Logan Lynn
- Released: 2006
- Recorded: 1998–2000, 2005
- Genre: Indie, electropop
- Label: Logan Lynn Music
- Producer: PFog and Logan Lynn

Logan Lynn chronology
GLEE (2000)	Logan Lynn (2006)	Feed Me to the Wolves (2007)

Logan Lynn is the second studio album released by Logan Lynn on his own label, Logan Lynn Music, on September 20, 2006.

== Music videos ==
Official music videos were released for all three singles over the course of 2006. The "Ring Around" video was directed by Dani Hunter and featured a drugged-out Lynn sketching out all over Portland. The director of photography was Galvin Collins. The editor/cameraman was Chris Davis, with makeup by Patty Kovach. The "Come Home" video was directed by Rebecca Micciche and featured Lynn in his NW Portland condo alongside actors cast in the role of his family members. This video also featured costuming by Emmy Award-winning stylist/designer Amanda Needham (Portlandia).

== Track listing ==
No.	Title	Length
1.	"Intro"	0:16
2.	"Here We Go Again"	5:43
3.	"Ring Around"	3:22
4.	"Come Home"	3:34
5.	"'til the Wheels Fall Off (DJ Dantronix Mix)"	3:44
6.	"Monday Morning"	3:13
7.	"Smoke and Barlight"	5:00
8.	"The Mothership"	5:12
9.	"Panic"	3:51
10.	"Meat"	4:39
11.	"You Think Like a Man"	4:32
12.	"A Place Behind the Sky"	4:28
13.	"Licking the Walls"	3:26
14.	"Aftermath"	2:37
15.	"Burning Your Glory"	4:16
16.	"Watch Me Die"	4:28
17.	"Show Me the World"	4:08
18.	"Pills With Smiling Faces"	4:49
19.	"The End of the Scene"	4:57
