= We Used to Be Friends =

2003 single by the Dandy Warhols

Single by the Dandy Warhols

from the album Welcome to the Monkey House
- B-side: "Call Me"; "Relax"; "Minnesoter"
- Released: May 5, 2003
- Length: 3:19
- Label: Capitol
- Songwriters: Courtney Taylor-Taylor; Grant Nicholas; Bjorn Thorsrud
- Producers: Courtney Taylor-Taylor; Nick Rhodes

The Dandy Warhols singles chronology
"Get Off" (re-release) (2002)	"We Used to Be Friends" (2003)	"You Were the Last High" (2003)

"We Used to Be Friends" is a song by American alternative rock band the Dandy Warhols. It was released as the lead single from their fourth studio album, Welcome to the Monkey House, in May 2003. The single did not chart in the United States but peaked at number 18 in the United Kingdom and entered the top 50 in Australia, Ireland, and Italy.

== Content ==
The song bears a similar intro riff, chord progression and vocal melody to that of a Feeder song "Day In Day Out", and the band listed Grant Nicholas as co-writer to avoid a lawsuit.

== Reception ==
NME praised the track, describing it as "a synthetic chatter of robotic handclaps and tweaky guitar fuzz, creamed off with a squeaky-clean chorus delivered in alarming falsetto".

== Cultural references ==
The song is known for being the theme song to the TV series Veronica Mars, and was also notably featured in episodes of The O.C. and Wonderfalls, as well as the FIFA Football 2004 soundtrack. It was also the theme song to Australian reality series My Restaurant Rules, and was featured as background music in the LucasArts video game Thrillville: Off the Rails.

In 2011, Chris Carrabba of Dashboard Confessional covered the song on his album Covered in the Flood. Alejandro Escovedo recorded a new acoustic version for the soundtrack of the 2014 film adaptation Veronica Mars. Chrissie Hynde covered the song for season 4 of Veronica Mars.

== Track listings ==
CD
No.	Title	Writer(s)	Length
1.	"We Used to Be Friends"		3:20
2.	"Call Me" (Blondie cover)	Debbie Harry and Giorgio Moroder	3:32
3.	"Relax" (Frankie Goes to Hollywood cover)	Peter Gill, Holly Johnson, Brian Nash and Mark O'Toole	3:49

7-inch vinyl

1. "We Used to Be Friends"
2. "Minnesoter" (Thee Slayer Hippie mix)

DVD

1. "We Used to Be Friends" (video)
2. "Bohemian Like You" (Boston Dave mix)
3. "Minnesoter" (Thee Slayer Hippie mix)
4. An introduction to the Dandy Warhols

== Charts ==
Weekly chart performance for "We Used to Be Friends"
Chart (2003)	Peak position
Australia (ARIA)	46
Ireland (IRMA)	45
Italy (FIMI)	42
Scotland Singles (Official Charts)	16
UK Singles (Official Charts)	18

== Release history ==
Release dates and formats "We Used to Be Friends"
Region	Date	Format(s)	Label(s)	Ref.
United Kingdom	May 5, 2003	7-inch vinyl; CD; DVD	Parlophone	
Australia	May 12, 2003	CD	Capitol	
United States	August 4, 2003	Triple A radio	Capitol	
United States	August 11, 2003	Alternative radio	Capitol	
