= Beat the World Records =

- Parent company: EMI, The End
- Founded: 2008
- Founder: The Dandy Warhols
- Distributors: Caroline, Endless
- Genre: Rock, electronic
- Country of origin: U.S.
- Location: Portland, Oregon
- Official website: beattheworld.com

Beat the World Records is a record label founded by The Dandy Warhols in Portland, Oregon, in 2008.

== Early years ==
In 2007 Portland, Oregon band The Dandy Warhols had the idea of starting their own label and signed Portland shoegaze outfit The Upsidedown, followed by indie electropop artist Logan Lynn. In 2008 The Dandy Warhols split with long-time record company Capitol Records and officially launched Beat The World Records as a Caroline Records EMI 3rd-Party label. Rockers Monstrous, indie pop boy band The Hugs, Los Angeles western rock group Spindrift and Dandy guitar rock proteges were signed in the years which followed.

== Caroline/EMI years ==
In 2008 The Dandy Warhols released ...Earth to the Dandy Warhols..., the first official release on Beat The World. Shortly thereafter they put out an EP, Earth to the Remix E.P. Volume One, consisting of electronic remixed versions of tracks from Earth and Earth to the Remix E.P. Volume Two a few months later. The label released Logan Lynn's Feed Me to the Wolves EP and re-released his entire catalog in a package called "The Complete Collection" on the Beat the World label in 2008, followed by a full-length album from The Upsidedown in 2008 as well.

Logan Lynn released his critically acclaimed, full-length album From Pillar to Post on Beat The World Records in September 2009. In November 2009, Beat The World released a Dandy Warhols cover of The Beatles' "Blackbird" in tribute to the death of Michael Jackson, referencing the lyrics of their 2003 song "Welcome to the Monkey House", from the album of the same name: "When Michael Jackson dies/We're covering Blackbird". The following month, the band released The Dandy Warhols Are Sound, the original mix of their album Welcome to the Monkey House. This version of the record was the initial mix done by Grammy Award-winning soul producer Russell Elevado, which was rejected by Capitol Records and shelved for six years. Are Sound received a generally muted response, and fared poorly in comparison to the original album.

After releasing an EP, an album and a single, and spending three years on the label, Logan Lynn announced that he was leaving Beat The World in July 2010. The Hugs left the label at that same time, while opening for Lynn on tour. As a result of his departure, Lynn ended up self-releasing the album he had been working on for Beat the World as a benefit for Portland's Q Center. In an interview from 2010 with Melbourne, Australia's Daily Telegraph, Dandy Warhols frontman Courtney Taylor-Taylor is quoted as saying "We're terrible at business, terrible. We don't know what we're doing. It's like trying to have children run a household. We need to hook up with some indie label." In an interview with German magazine Catch Fire from later that same year, Logan Lynn is quoted as saying "I love the Warhols and everybody had really great intentions going in but... No radio, no real distribution, no licensing, no PR. Without those things in place, artists fail...and my last record fell victim to that." Monstrous, The Hugs and Spindrift never officially released anything on Beat The World.

== End Records years ==
Beat The World cut ties with Caroline Records EMI in 2010 and began working with The End Records in 2011. The Dandy Warhols released an album of new work titled This Machine on Beat The World Records on April 24, 2012.

== Roster ==
- The Dandy Warhols
- Logan Lynn
- The Upsidedown
- The Hugs
- Spindrift
- Brush Prairie
- Pete International Airport
- Immigrant Union
