= I Killed Tomorrow Yesterday =

Studio album by Logan Lynn
- Released: August 31, 2010
- Recorded: 2009–2010
- Genre: Electropop
- Label: Logan Lynn Music
- Producer: Bryan Cecil

Logan Lynn chronology
The Last High (Single) (2010)	I Killed Tomorrow Yesterday (2010)	Blood in the Water (album) (2011)

I Killed Tomorrow Yesterday is the fifth studio album by American musician Logan Lynn, released August 31, 2010 on his own label, Logan Lynn Music.

== Album ==
"I Killed Tomorrow Yesterday" was the follow-up to Logan Lynn's 2009 critically acclaimed, major label release "From Pillar To Post". Produced by Bryan Cecil and released on Lynn's label, Logan Lynn Music, the record was the first official release by Lynn after leaving The Dandy Warhols-owned and operated Beat the World Records, a Caroline Records / EMI 3rd party label. 100% of the first year of proceeds from the record went to benefit the programs and services of Q Center, which operates both the LGBTQ Community Center and the Sexual & Gender Minority Youth Resource Center (SMYRC) in Portland.

The record was named Album of the Year in 2010 by QPDX, Just Out and other media outlets. Out Magazine wrote “Logan Lynn’s emo-disco-pop blend has already made him a hit with gay guys who like to hear their lives — from the highs to the lows — set to music. His ability to capture melancholy and melody is really no surprise, given that the grandmother who taught him about music also taught a similarly emotional man, Johnny Cash.” in an interview with Lynn.

== Music videos ==
In June 2011, Lynn's “Quickly As We Pass” video premiered on Logo and MTV to rave reviews in the press. The video was directed by Jeffrey McHale and produced by Logan Lynn Music. It featured a series of animated, life-size, cardboard cutouts throughout. Because of the nudity in the video, Logo, MTV and VH1 rejected the first three versions of the video. A black bar-edited, censored version would appear on those outlets instead. Writing for Windy City Times, David Byrne called it "forward-thinking Imogen Heap mentoring a DIY artist with the hipster sound stemming from Brooklyn. The end product would be 'Quickly As We Pass'...the song is very catchy."

== Track listing ==
No.	Title	Length
1.	"Things Are Looking Up"	3:29
2.	"Smoke Rings"	4:57
3.	"Velocity"	3:12
4.	"Quickly As We Pass"	5:01
5.	"I Erased Who I Was For You"	5:01
6.	"Fly Me Through"	4:40
7.	"Tennis Whites"	4:58
8.	"It's Too Late"	4:42
9.	"A Hundred Years of Letting Me Down"	4:39
10.	"Fall Into New Arms"	6:35
