= Bohemian Like You =

2000 single by the Dandy Warhols

- Original release CD1 cover

Single by the Dandy Warhols

from the album Thirteen Tales from Urban Bohemia
- B-side: "Hells Bells"; "Lance"
- Released: July 11, 2000
- Genre: Power pop
- Length: 3:31
- Label: Capitol
- Songwriter: Courtney Taylor-Taylor
- Producers: Dave Sardy; Taylor-Taylor; Gregg Williams

The Dandy Warhols singles chronology
"Get Off" (2000)	"Bohemian Like You" (2000)	"Godless" (2001)

Alternative cover
- 2001 reissue cover

Music video
- "Bohemian Like You" on YouTube

"Bohemian Like You" is a song by American alternative rock band the Dandy Warhols. The song was written by frontman Courtney Taylor-Taylor after seeing a woman pull up in her car to the traffic lights outside his apartment. It was released as the second single from the band's third studio album, Thirteen Tales from Urban Bohemia, on July 11, 2000.

The song reached the top 10 on the US Billboard Triple-A chart, peaking at No. 7. It was also a hit in several other countries, reaching the top five in Greece and Italy and peaking at No. 1 in Portugal. It initially reached No. 42 on the UK Singles Chart in 2000, but after featuring in a popular Vodafone advertisement, it was re-released in October 2001 and peaked at No. 5 on the same chart.

== Background ==
Lead singer Courtney Taylor-Taylor said the song was inspired when he saw a woman in a car stopped at the traffic light below his apartment window and began to fantasize about a relationship with her. He said, "My silly little brain ran amok with the dream of love and vintage motor malfunctions. It was only natural to weave it into a song on the spot."

== Critical reception ==
Louis Pattison of NME called the song "the quintessential Dandy Warhols moment to date". In 2011, Robert Webb of The Independent called it "a defining song of the last decade".

The A.V. Club noted the various influences from "retro" music present in the song, including how the guitar intro seems to imitate that of "Little Bitch" by the Specials as well as "Brown Sugar" by the Rolling Stones.

== Music video ==
The music video for the song was directed by Taylor-Taylor.

The video shows the band playing in a karaoke bar (the now-closed Slabtown bar in Portland, Oregon) while different people sing the lyrics of the song as displayed on the television at the bar. In this video, the scenes correspond with the lyrics. In the first verse, a man approaches a young woman who is working on a hearse with her friends. They both flirtatiously sing the lyrics to each other as a sign of attraction. The man is so attracted to the woman that he stares at her lower body and then visualizes her naked. Then the video switches to a waiter while he is serving a group of customers at a table. One of the girls in the group is attracted to the waiter and the two begin to flirt and mime the lyrics to the second verse. She visualizes him naked. For the third verse the waiter and the mechanic who was fixing the car are in the same apartment. While the mechanic and her new love interest exchange a look, the woman from the restaurant emerges from a curtain wearing a babydoll. She then takes the waiter's hand and pulls him away. The video ends with the characters from the video singing the lyrics in the karaoke bar along with many other people including a man spinning a hula hoop around his waist.

== Track listings ==
=== Original 2000 release ===
All tracks are written by Taylor-Taylor except "Hells Bells", written by Angus Young, Brian Johnson, and Malcolm Young.

UK 7-inch single
No.	Title	Length
1.	"Bohemian Like You"
2.	"Hells Bells" (AC/DC cover)

UK CD1
No.	Title	Length
1.	"Bohemian Like You"
2.	"Hells Bells" (AC/DC cover)
3.	"Lance"

UK CD2
No.	Title	Length
1.	"Bohemian Like You"
2.	"Retarded"
3.	"Dub Song"

Australian Tour EP
No.	Title	Length
1.	"Bohemian Like You"	3:30
2.	"Not If You Were the Last Junkie on Earth (Heroin Is So Passe)" (live)	3:07
3.	"Minnesoter"	3:03
4.	"Get Off" (C11H15NO2 mix)	6:41
5.	"Hells Bells"	6:00

=== 2001 re-release ===
UK CD single
No.	Title	Length
1.	"Bohemian Like You"	3:31
2.	"Hells Bells"	6:50
3.	"Lance"	2:50

European CD single
No.	Title	Length
1.	"Bohemian Like You"	3:31
2.	"Hells Bells"	6:50

== Personnel ==
The Dandy Warhols

- Courtney Taylor-Taylor – lead vocals, guitar
- Peter Holmström – guitar
- Zia McCabe – bass, synthesizer, tambourine
- Brent DeBoer – drums, backing vocals

Additional personnel

- Erik Gavriluk – organ

== Charts ==
=== Weekly charts ===
Chart (2000–2002)	Peak position
Australia (ARIA)	74
Europe (Eurochart Hot 100)	20
Germany (GfK)	42
Greece (IFPI)	5
Ireland (IRMA)	17
Italy (FIMI)	5
Netherlands (Dutch Top 40)	19
Netherlands (Single Top 100)	24
Portugal (AFP)	1
Scottish Singles Sales (Official Charts)	4
Switzerland (Schweizer Hitparade)	49
UK Singles (Official Charts)	5
UK Airplay (Music Week)	2
US Modern Rock Tracks (Billboard)	28
US Triple-A (Billboard)	7

=== Year-end charts ===
Chart (2000)	Position
US Triple-A (Billboard)	50

Chart (2001)	Position
UK Singles (OCC)	115
UK Airplay (Music Week)	48

Chart (2002)	Position
Italy (FIMI)	35

== Certifications ==
Region	Certification	Certified units/sales
New Zealand (RMNZ)	Platinum	30,000^{‡}
Sweden (GLF)	Gold	15,000^{^}
United Kingdom (BPI)	Platinum	600,000^{‡}
^{^} Shipments figures based on certification alone.^{‡} Sales+streaming figures based on certification alone.

== Release history ==
Region	Date	Format(s)	Label(s)	Ref.
United States	July 11, 2000	Alternative radio	Capitol	
United Kingdom	August 28, 2000	7-inch vinyl; CD	Capitol	
International	September 11, 2000	CD	Capitol	
Australia	October 16, 2000	CD	Capitol	
United Kingdom (re-release)	October 29, 2001	CD; cassette	Capitol	

== In popular culture ==
The song has been featured in several movies, including The Replacements, Summer Catch, Igby Goes Down, Clockstoppers, Flushed Away, Little Nicky, Foolproof, Delirious and Man of the Year. Among the television series it has been featured on are Buffy the Vampire Slayer, Numb3rs, Six Feet Under, Daria, Fresh Meat, and Chuck. A very obvious variation of the song is used as the opening theme song for the American version of the game show Cash Cab. The song was also featured in season 7 of Dancing with the Stars for Cody Linley and Julianne Hough's tango performance. For many years it has been the theme music for the BBC Radio phone-in show 6-0-6. It has also been featured in the PlayStation game Test Drive Le Mans in 2000.

In 2006, a mashup between the song and "Horny" by Mousse T. was released as the single "Horny as a Dandy". It reached No. 17 on the UK Singles Chart.

The song was the subject of a minor controversy in 2011 when British conservative politician Theresa May played the song as she walked from a conference speech. It was initially speculated that the track was "Rocks" by Primal Scream, who posted a statement on their website condemning her "inappropriate" use of their song, calling her a "legalised bully" and "the enemy". After discovering the track was his, Dandy Warhols frontman Courtney Taylor-Taylor posted an angry tirade on the band's official website, writing: "Why don't these assholes have right-wing bands make them some right-wing music for their right-wing jerkoff politics? Oh, because right-wing people aren't creative, visionary, or any fun to be around."

In 2015, the song was played at the opening of John Bishop's tour DVD Supersonic.

=== Advertising ===
The song was used extensively by British telecommunications provider Vodafone when it introduced its brand to many of its worldwide operations in 2001–2004.

Elsewhere, it featured prominently in a number of advertisements commissioned by Ford Motor Company for its Ford Focus car range. It also enjoyed a short run in America in 2002 in a commercial featuring the Ford Mustang. In Australia, Holden used the song in an advert to promote its Holden Astra range, although the line "You got a great car/Yeah, what's wrong with it today?" was edited out. The song also featured in a 2004 advertisement for GM Summerdrive in the United States. In November 2008, it featured (without words) on advertisements for the Citroën C4 Picasso. In summer 2010, the track was used in an advertisement for Next clothing.
