= Logan Lynn =

American musician, writer, producer, filmmaker, TV personality and activist

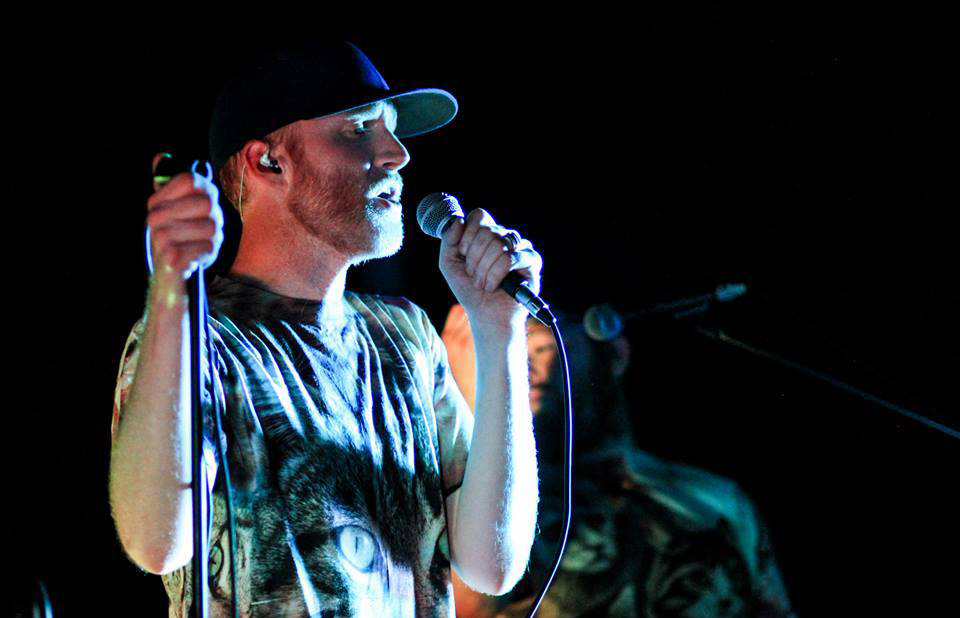
- Lynn performing at Beatbox in San Francisco, July 19, 2013.

Background information
- Born: Logan Dennis Lynn; October 15, 1979 (age 46)
- Genres: Dance, pop, electronic, techno, alternative music, piano, indie
- Occupations: Musician, writer, producer, filmmaker, television personality, LGBT activist, mental health advocate, public relations, tech
- Years active: 1998–present
- Labels: KNIK Records; Kill Rock Stars; Beat the World Records; Caroline Records; EMI; Greyday Records; Logan Lynn Music; Mohr Media; Banana Stand Records
- Website: loganlynnmusic.com

Logan Dennis Lynn (born October 15, 1979) is an American musician, writer, producer, filmmaker, television personality, mental health advocate, and LGBTQ+ activist.

Since 1998 he has released twelve studio albums, and he is the former host of Logo's weekly music video countdown cable television show "NewNowNext Music". Lynn is signed to Portugal. The Man’s record label KNIK Records after being signed to Kill Rock Stars for many years.

Lynn is the spokesperson for the .gay domain, previously founded the Keep Oregon Well campaign to eliminate social stigma surrounding mental health through music and the arts, and launched the PTM Foundation with Alternative Rock Band Portugal. The Man. Lynn is also the CEO of Music in Demand under The Gaybors Group, an LGBTQ+ talent agency he founded.

== Early life ==
Lynn was born to William Dennis Lynn, a Christian minister, and Debra Lynn "Debby" Lynn (née Stockburger). Lynn's paternal grandmother, LaVanda Mae Fielder, was a piano and vocal instructor who worked out of her home. One of her pupils was a young Johnny Cash. Lynn's father was a traveling preacher and proponent of a Christian touring sermon series known as "The Strong Family Seminar".

Lynn later moved from rural York, Nebraska to Olathe, Kansas, a suburb of Kansas City, and befriended Jim Suptic, Ryan Pope and Rob Pope of The Get Up Kids at Olathe South High School from 1995 to 1996 and spent much of his time in Kansas City. The party outlet led him to begin working as a DJ, and he started to write songs after he moved to Portland, Oregon in 1996.

== Music career ==
After moving to Portland from the Midwestern United States, Lynn caught the attention of Portland band The Dandy Warhols, Elliott Smith and other local bands who were starting to take off in the mainstream. It's these artists who would shepherd Lynn's career in the early days, with The Dandy Warhols ultimately signing him to their label. In 2007, Lynn was signed to Beat The World Records, a Caroline Records and EMI Records subsidiary, run by The Dandy Warhols.

Lynn performed at New York City Gay Pride celebration in 2007 and his performance was seen by a representative from MTV's Logo network. The LGBT-interest channel was interested in building its offering of artists and acts and recruited Lynn. The following year, he made his first TV appearance as host of Logo's hour-long NewNowNext music video countdown.

During this time, Lynn overdosed on a mixture of crack cocaine and alcohol and suffered a TIA pre-stroke attack in 2008. He spent a large portion of the year in drug rehabilitation in St. Helens, Oregon. He was released later that year and has remained clean.

In 2009 Lynn's album, From Pillar to Post, was released and he was given an industry showcase at the CMJ Music Marathon festival that year. In July 2010 Lynn announced that he was leaving the label and parting ways with The Dandy Warhols. Following his departure from Beat the World Records, Lynn self-released the album he had been working on for the label, "I Killed Tomorrow Yesterday", on August 31, 2010, as a benefit for Portland's Q Center. In the fall of 2011 Lynn contributed a song, "Movies", to Live From Nowhere Near You (Volume 2).

Lynn released a ten-song album on December 4, 2012, titled Tramp Stamps and Birthmarks. The record was named "Album of the Year" by multiple media outlets. In June 2013, Lynn headlined the Queer Music Summer Tour alongside queer rapper Big Dipper and others. Later that year Lynn released a cover of "We Can't Stop" by Miley Cyrus, produced by Gino Mari. New York Magazine called Lynn's version "dreamy, guitar-heavy" and The Huffington Post wrote that it was "bold" and "warmer" than the original. Cyrus went on to perform Lynn and Mari's arrangement of the song on Saturday Night Live on October 5, 2013.

In 2016, Lynn released his eighth studio album, Adieu. Willamette Week called the record his "most uncomfortable album yet". Lynn was then the subject of a story in the October 2016 issue of Innocent Words Music Magazine, in which they called him "a modern day Gene Kelly".

In March 2017, Lynn appeared on an episode of Jay Mohr's Mohr Stories podcast. Lynn and Mohr discussed music, addiction recovery, overcoming childhood trauma, and mental health at length, as well as a forthcoming Lynn album that was inspired by Lynn's relationship with Mohr. In October 2018, Lynn's Jay Mohr-produced, ninth studio album My Movie Star was released. In a review of the record, Billboard said "For nearly 20 years, dance-pop artist Logan Lynn has made a career out of crafting catchy, disorderly songs that almost all include big beats, fun melodies and cheeky lyrics. But on his latest album, My Movie Star, Lynn has traded in his signature sound for a more somber, melancholy tone — a dynamic new album consisting of Lynn's new piano-driven songs and filled with remixes and covers by other industry greats."

In 2019 Lynn released a single titled "Name Your Trouble", which was written and produced with Styrofoam (musician) for the EastSiders season 4 soundtrack on Netflix, one of 5 songs by Lynn on the soundtrack. In 2020 Portland, Oregon-based record label Banana Stand released a live Logan Lynn EP featuring Glasys on keys titled "Unpeeled". Toronto's Disarm Music Magazine premiered the first two live performances videos from the release. In October of that year, Lynn released a music video for the "Rich and Beautiful" single.

In 2021 record label Kill Rock Stars announced that they had signed Logan Lynn and that they would be releasing Lynn's 10th studio album, titled New Money, in 2022. Lynn's first single for the label, a cover of Gossip (band)'s Standing in the Way of Control was released on June 17, 2021, and also appears on the Kill Rock Stars 30th anniversary compilation. In August of that same year Kill Rock Stars released the album version of Logan Lynn's "Rich and Beautiful", followed by the second single from New Money, titled "Eat&Drink&Smoke&Shop&Fuck". In September 2021 Kill Rock Stars released the third single from the album, titled "Here's To Us", followed by an original song titled "It's Christmas, Motherfuckers!" on the Kill Rock Stars Winter Holiday compilation album, "It's Hard To Dance When It's Cold And There's No Music".

In January 2022 Logan Lynn released the fourth single from New Money via Kill Rock Stars, a cover of Elliott Smith's Baby Britain. That same month Kill Rock Stars released the 5th single and video off the album, "Is There Anyone Else Like This In The World?" On January 21, 2022 Kill Rock Stars released Logan Lynn's debut record for the label, New Money.

In 2023 Logan Lynn announced a collaboration with production duo Yellow Trash Can. On July 21, 2023 Kill Rock Stars released the Distracted EP, which featured 5 new songs by Logan Lynn X Yellow Trash Can. In a review of the EP, Bearded Gentlemen Music said the release was "A sublime example of contemporary pop" and that "Lynn's clear tenor flirts openly with crisp musicianship to create catchy music packed with big '80s and '90s radio vibes." In their review, ListenBoise wrote "Logan Lynn teams up with Yellow Trash Can to turn big pop into big emotion on Distracted...a beautifully personal EP that explores the unexpected and sometimes painful journey through love, loss, and happiness." Kill Rock Stars also put out a short film by the same name alongside the EP, created by Lynn and filmmaker Katie Marks. Lynn also announced that he was in the studio working on a full-length follow-up for the label at this time, slated for release in 2024.

In March 2024 it was announced that Lynn's 11th album, titled SOFTCORE, would be released by Kill Rock Stars that following summer. It was also revealed that there would be a short film released by the same name at that time. The first single To Be Of Use, a cover of Bill Callahan SMOG's original song, was released alongside the music video on March 20, 2024. In their review of the new song, Last Day Deaf wrote "Lynn's version of To Be Of Use is an Indie Electronic masterpiece...a testament to his bold creativity and fearless approach to music-making, blending pain with style in a way that is uniquely his own."

After releasing four subsequent singles ahead of the album, Lynn released SOFTCORE on June 7, 2024. In their album review, Willamette Week called the record “triumphantly vulnerable and unapologetically horny”.

Logan Lynn signed with Portugal. The Man’s KNIK Records in 2025 and in June of 2026 announced the label was releasing his twelfth studio album and producing an accompanying documentary feature film, The Pain And The Power.

== Online harassment, launching the .gay domain ==
In 2018, Lynn directed and released the short film Nothing's Ever Wrong, which featured actor Jay Mohr fully nude for the first time in his career. The resulting speculation about the nature of their relationship led to a barrage of online harassment towards both, including a coordinated misinformation campaign by thousands of fans of the Opie and Anthony radio show. In March 2019, People magazine published an exclusive piece on Lynn, detailing the months of targeted harassment and homophobic abuse, which stemmed from a since-deleted hate group on Reddit about shock jocks Opie and Anthony. Regarding the widespread bullying, Lynn told People "It's been my experience that nothing triggers this type of toxic masculinity culture more than a gay man who isn't afraid, and I can't think of anything I am less afraid of than a bunch of fragile dudes who can't deal with my existence."

In 2019, Lynn partnered with internet company Top Level Design to help create a safer internet through the global launch of the .gay domain, for which he is the brand spokesperson.

== Working with Portugal. The Man ==
On July 12, 2018 Billboard published a story about Logan Lynn and Portugal. The Man going on tour together to promote mental health awareness. The partnership between Lynn and Portugal. The Man was also featured in Broadway World magazine, in addition to several other music news outlets. The band announced that Lynn had officially joined the Portugal. The Man team shortly after.

In June of 2026 the band announced they had signed Logan Lynn to their record label, KNIK Records.

== Commercial spots, TV and film ==
Lynn has been featured on the Logo TV channel, through his videos, in hosting roles, and commercial spots, since the channel launched in 2006. Lynn's songs have also been featured in filmmaker Mark Jerako's film Feeble In Fuchsia, on the soundtrack for Episode 6 of Brandon Semenuk's show "Coastal Crew" with Mutiny Bikes for their "Battle Los Angeles" special on ESPN, in "One Day With Jordi Tixier" a 2013 short-film featuring French motocross star Jordi Tixier, and other sports events and videos. The fashion houses of Oscar de la Renta, and Nicole Miller have also used Lynn's music for their campaigns.

In 2017, Lynn starred in Last Meal Series, a TV show from Two Penguins Productions and the writers of Search Party on TBS. The show's cast also includes Hutch Harris of The Thermals, Sabrina Jalees, Nicole J. Georges, Brent Knopf of Menomena and El Vy and other Portland and LA-based artists and actors. In 2020, Logan Lynn co-created and starred in a .gay and Two Penguins-produced web series, "The Library", which premiered on Revry TV.

Lynn’s songs were featured prominently in the soundtrack for EastSiders on Netflix as well as Unconventional on Revry TV.

In 2026 Portugal. The Man announced they would be producing and releasing a documentary feature film about Lynn’s life and career, The Pain And The Power, by filmmaker Cai Indermaur. Logan Lynn performed all eleven songs on the original motion picture soundtrack for the film, released on Portugal. The Man’s record label, KNIK.

== Editorial and charitable work ==
Logan Lynn has written for HuffPost Gay Voices, HuffPost Green, HuffPost Healthy Living, Huffpost Celebrity, HuffPost Entertainment, Just Out Magazine, The Portland Mercury, and Moviefone.

In May 2015, Logan Lynn launched the "Keep Oregon Well" Concert Series, a campaign to fight stigma surrounding mental and behavioral health, with Trillium Group and Alpha Media, where he interviewed bands backstage before the shows, about their own self care and experiences of mental health. In 2017, the National Council gave Lynn the Award of Excellence for Artistic Expression.

== Discography ==
=== Studio albums ===
- This Is Folk Techno/Pull the Plug (1998)
- GLEE (2000)
- Logan Lynn (2006)
- From Pillar to Post (2009)
- I Killed Tomorrow Yesterday (2010)
- Blood in the Water (2011)
- Tramp Stamps and Birthmarks (2012)
- Adieu. (2016)
- My Movie Star (2018)
- New Money (2022)
- SOFTCORE (2024)

=== EPs ===
- Clean & Stupid EP (2007)
- Feed Me to the Wolves EP (2007)
- Blood in the Water 4-volume limited edition EP collection (2009)
- Everything You Touch Turns to Gold Acoustic EP (2012)
- Turn Me Out (Remix EP) (2012)
- Dance Alone EP (2013)
- Unpeeled Live EP (2020)
- Other People's Money (Remix EP) EP (2022)
- Distracted EP (2023)

=== Singles ===
- The Last High (2010)
- Turn Me Out (single) (2012)
- Do You Want Me or Not? (2012)
- We Can't Stop (2013)
- We Will Overcome (2014)
- The One (2016)
- Go There When You Want to Be Loved (2016)
- Name Your Trouble (2019)
- Rich and Beautiful (2020)
- Standing In The Way Of Control (Cover Version) (2021)
- Rich and Beautiful (Album Version) (2021)
- Eat&Drink&Smoke&Shop&Fuck (2021)
- Here's To Us (2021)
- It's Christmas, Motherfuckers! (2021)
- Baby Britain (Cover Version) (2022)
- Is There Anyone Else Like This In The World? (2022)
- Help Me Out (2023)
- I Got A Man (2023)
- Distracted (2023)
- Loud and Clear (2023)
- With Bells On (2023)
- To Be Of Use (2024)
- I'm Just A Hole, Sir (2024)
- I Feel Alone When I'm With You (2024)
- Bet It All (2024)
- SOFTCORE (2022)

=== Live albums ===
- Live from Seattle (2013) – out of print

=== Compilation records ===
- Live from Nowhere Near You Volume 2 (2011)
- Comp 175 (2012)
- AB//XO Volume 1 (2013)
- PDX Pop Now! (2017)
- Stars Rock Kill (Rock Stars) Kill Rock Stars 30th Anniversary Compilation Album (2021)
- Kill Rock Stars Winter Holiday Album: It's Hard to Dance When it's Cold and There's No Music (2021)

=== Music videos ===
- "Here We Go Again" (1999)
- "Ring Around" (2006)
- "Come Home" (2006)
- "Show Me the World" (2007)
- "Come Home (13 Puzzle Pieces Remix)" (2007)
- "Burning Your Glory (Empire Edit)" (2007)
- "Feed Me to the Wolves" (2007)
- "Write It on My Left Arm" (2009)
- "Bottom Your Way to the Top" (2009)
- "The Last High" (2010)
- "Quickly as We Pass" (2011)
- "Turn Me Out" (2012)
- "Hologram" (2013)
- "Everything You Touch Turns to Gold (Album Version)" (2013)
- "Tramp Stamps and Birthmarks" (2013)
- "We Will Overcome" (2014)
- "Break Me Down" (2015)
- "The One" (2016)
- "Go There When You Want to Be Loved" (2016)
- "Oh, Lucifer" (2017)
- "Big City Now" (2018) - My Movie Star Featurette
- "Like Before" (2018) - My Movie Star Featurette
- "My Movie Star" (2018) - My Movie Star Featurette
- "Underground" (2018)
- "Nothing's Ever Wrong" (2018)
- "Nothing's Ever Wrong (Director's Cut)" (2018)
- "This Time I Lost It All" (2018)
- "Beside You" (2018)
- "Rich and Beautiful (Single Version)" (2020)
- "Standing in the Way of Control" (2021)
- "Rich and Beautiful (Album Version)" (2021)
- "Eat&Drink&Smoke&Shop&Fuck" (2021)
- "Here's To Us" (2021)
- "It's Christmas, Motherfuckers!" (2021)
- "Baby Britain" (2022)
- "Is There Anyone Else Like This In The World?" (2022)
- Help Me Out (2023)
- I Got A Man (2023)
- Distracted (2023)
- Loud and Clear (2023)
- With Bells On (2023)
- To Be Of Use (2024)
- I'm Just A Hole, Sir (2024)
- I Feel Alone When I'm With You (2024)
- Bet It All (2024)
- SOFTCORE (2022)
