= Give Me Something (Jarryd James song) =

Single by Jarryd James

from the album Thirty One
- Released: 18 May 2015
- Recorded: 2015
- Genre: Indie pop; soul; alternative R&B
- Length: 3:11
- Label: Dryden Street, Universal Music Australia
- Songwriter(s): Jarryd James; Joel Little
- Producer(s): Jarryd James, Joel Little

Jarryd James singles chronology
"Do You Remember" (2015)	"Give Me Something" (2015)	"Regardless" (2015)

Music video
- "Give Me Something" on YouTube

"Give Me Something" is a single released from Australian singer-songwriter Jarryd James. The song was written and produced by Jarryd James and Joel Little. It was released digitally on 18 May 2015 and distributed by Universal Music Australia, with whom James signed a deal in early 2015.

Lyrically, James sings about realising someone might not love you as much as you love them and scrambling for a piece of them.

"Give Me Something" debuted at number 68 on the ARIA Singles Chart and was certified platinum in 2019.

== Reviews ==
Mike Wass of Idolator said; "'Give Me Something' is a heady rush of soul-tinged, retro-leaning pop — albeit with an extremely modern twist. Jarryd begs the object of his affection for a little more affection over squiggly synths and squelchy beats. There's a splash of Prince, a touch of Chet Faker and a large serve of something completely original." Wass believes the song is "just as good — if not better than — his breakthrough hit".

Indie Trendsetters said; "Outrageously spunky, punchy, with bold accents and a serious wow factor, Jarryd James hits a magnificent stride with 'Give Me Something'. The organ is skipping, the bass is blaring and Jarryd’s beat-driven falsetto is bringing everything together."

== Video ==
Jarryd James released the video for "Give Me Something" via YouTube on 8 July 2015. In the video we see James gazing admiringly at a young blonde woman in white who's skirting the edges of a swimming pool in what looks like a contemporary, but rustic home in the middle of nowhere.

== Track listing ==
1. "Give Me Something"

== Charts ==
Chart (2015)	Peak position
Australia (ARIA)	59
Australia Independent Chart (AIR)	5

== Certifications ==
Region	Certification	Certified units/sales
Australia (ARIA)	Platinum	70,000^{‡}
^{‡} Sales+streaming figures based on certification alone.

== Release history ==
Country	Date	Format	Label
Australia	18 May 2015	Digital download	Dryden Street, Universal Music Australia
