= Thirty One (Jarryd James album) =

Studio album by Jarryd James
- Released: 11 September 2015
- Recorded: 2014–2015; Auckland, Los Angeles, Melbourne, Sydney
- Genre: Indie pop, alternative R&B
- Label: Dryden Street, Universal Music Australia
- Producer: Joel Little

Jarryd James chronology
Jarryd James (2015)	Thirty One (2015)	High (2016)

Singles from Thirty One
- 1. "Do You Remember" Released: 30 January 2015; 2. "Give Me Something" Released: 18 May 2015; 3. "Regardless" Released: 4 August 2015; 4. "Sure Love" Released: 4 August 2015

Thirty One is the debut studio album by Australian singer-songwriter, Jarryd James. It debuted at number 2 on the Australian ARIA Chart in September 2015.

At the J Awards of 2015, the album was nominated for Australian Album of the Year.

== Background ==
Throughout 2014, James was working as a full time youth worker. James supported New Zealand group Broods on their late 2014 Australian tour and Angus & Julia Stone on their February 2015 tour. His breakthrough came early in 2015 when his debut solo single “Do You Remember” climbed the charts, eventually peaking at number 2. James signed a record deal with Universal Music Australia.

The album was announced on 23 July 2015. Thirty One was recorded in Auckland, L.A., Melbourne and Sydney and was co-written by Joel Little, Malay, Pip Norman and (his longtime friend) Matt Corby.

== Reviews ==
Roshan Clerke from The Music gave the album 4 out of 5, saying; “The bittersweet themes of 'Do You Remember' permeate the rest of this album" adding, “The songs here are made to reflect the kind of seminal tracks that inspired James himself."

Jessica Thomas from Renowned for Sound gave the album 4.5 out of 5, saying: "His new record is all about minimalism; you won't find exaggerated or elaborate structures. Rather, it's all about simple rhythms centered around a message." She added: "Ultimately James has delivered a beautiful blend of soulful pop and subtle EDM that makes Thirty One a refined, fresh collection of inspired tracks."

Anabelle Ross from Rolling Stone Australia was more critical, giving the album 3 out of 5. Ross said: "Despite having two star producers on board [...] the Brisbanite falls shy of expectations with his debut LP. In fact, perhaps the biggest disappointment is that the record meets our expectations almost exactly – there are no surprises and nothing half as immediate as 'Do You Remember' [...] and so we have tracks that are not awful but indistinct, and tending to bleed into one another, turning the album into one long, rather sooky lament".

Claudia D'Amore from Sticky Trigger was also critical giving the album 4.5 out of 10. D'Amore commended first single "Do You Remember" but said the album reveals a common theme of "familiar drumbeat, clicks and snaps" and "the record overall becomes easily forgettable."

== Track listing ==
1. "Sell It to Me" – 4:30
2. "Underneath" – 5:17
3. "Sure Love" – 3:37
4. "Do You Remember" – 3:54
5. "Undone" – 4:44
6. "Regardless" (featuring Julia Stone) – 4:33
7. "Interlude" – 1:56
8. "This Time (Serious Symptoms, Simple Solutions)" – 4:18
9. "Giving It Up" – 4:41
10. "The Way You Like It" – 4:09
11. "Give Me Something" – 3:11
12. "High" – 4:41

== Charts ==
Thirty One debuted and peaked at number 2 in Australia, behind Bring Me the Horizon's album, That's the Spirit.

Chart (2015)	Peak position
Australian Albums (ARIA)	2
New Zealand Albums (RMNZ)	28

== Release history ==
Country	Date	Format	Label	Catalogue
Australia	11 September 2015	CD, digital download	Dryden Street / Universal Music Australia	4745533
