= You Were the Last High =

Single by The Dandy Warhols

from the album Welcome to the Monkey House
- Released: July 28, 2003
- Genre: Synth-pop
- Length: 4:48
- Label: Capitol
- Songwriters: Courtney Taylor-Taylor; Evan Dando
- Producers: Taylor-Taylor; Jeremy Wheatley

The Dandy Warhols singles chronology
"We Used to Be Friends" (2003)	"You Were the Last High" (2003)	"Plan A" (2003)

"You Were the Last High" (also known simply as "The Last High") is a song by American alternative rock band The Dandy Warhols. It was released in July 2003 as the second single from their fourth studio album Welcome to the Monkey House.

== Music video ==
The music video is an almost exact recreation of Duran Duran's "Planet Earth" video: this was influenced by the fact that Nick Rhodes, keyboardist for Duran Duran, produced Welcome to the Monkey House.

== Release ==
Released in July 2003 as the second single from Welcome to the Monkey House, "You Were the Last High" peaked at No. 34 on the UK Singles Chart.

"You Were the Last High" was one of the titular "nine songs" in the film 9 Songs, which featured a live performance of the song by the band. The song also featured in the film Lara Croft: Tomb Raider – The Cradle of Life.

"You Were the Last High" appeared on the band's greatest hits album The Capitol Years 1995–2007 under the shortened title "The Last High".

== Reception ==
The song was favorably received by critics, who generally cited it as a highlight of Welcome to the Monkey House. Pitchfork, in their otherwise negative review of Welcome to the Monkey House, called the track a "bright spot".

Of the track, Dandy Warhols guitarist Peter Holmström has said, "I think it's the best song we've ever done."

== Track listing ==
CD 1
No.	Title	Length
1.	"You Were the Last High"	4:48
2.	"We Used to Be Friends" (Coates & Stiles Mix)	5:24
3.	"Everyday Should Be a Holiday" (Tony Lash Mix)	3:53

CD 2

1. "You Were the Last High"
2. "Sun"
3. "Dye"

Limited edition 7" vinyl

1. "You Were the Last High"
2. "We Used to Be Friends" (Kenn Richards Remix)

== Charts ==
Chart performance for "You Were the Last High"
Chart (2003)	Peak position
Australia (ARIA)	71
Scottish Singles Sales (Official Charts)	43
UK Singles (Official Charts)	34
