= Adieu (album) =

Adieu.

Studio album by Logan Lynn
- Released: September 23, 2016
- Recorded: 2012–2016
- Genres: Rock, indie pop
- Length: 62 minutes
- Label: Logan Lynn Music
- Producers: Logan Lynn and Gino Mari

Logan Lynn chronology
'Dance Alone (EP)' (2013)	Adieu. (2016)	'My Movie Star' (2018)

Adieu. is a fifteen-song album released by Logan Lynn on September 23, 2016.

== Album ==
Lynn released Adieu. on September 23, 2016, on CD, digital and double album on red vinyl via his own label, Logan Lynn Music. Produced by Lynn and his longtime collaborator Gino Mari and recorded and mixed at The Country Club studios in Portland, the record has garnered celebrity endorsements from actor and comedian Jay Mohr, Author and Emmy Award-winning journalist Sheila Hamilton, Lynn's mentors and former label mates The Dandy Warhols and others.

On January 1, 2016, Lynn and his longtime producer and collaborator Gino Mari released a new single called "The One". Lynn sited his friends and former labelmates The Dandy Warhols for being the inspiration behind the song's modern garage rock sound. Glide Magazine wrote "Logan Lynn has always had a knack for making danceable rock and pop and with 'The One' he shows that he can now confidently rock out with the same gusto”.

In February 2016 Paste Magazine released the album art for Adieu and Vortex Music Magazine released the liner notes, where Lynn writes about his ongoing struggle with depression, surviving suicidal ideation in the face of grief, and his own resilience in the face of persistent mental and behavioral health challenges. In an interview with Coming Up Music Magazine, Lynn addressed the album's subject matter, "This record was really tough to make, which is why it will be four years between albums. I lost my partner, I lost my dog, and I lost myself in the process of losing them both. My own mental health struggles tend to show up in the form of persistent suicidal ideation…so the record is a snapshot of that time in my life. It’s about my mental health crisis, overcoming grief, and figuring out that love is still stronger than anything else, even in the face of extreme loss. It feels like the album I have been trying to make since 1998 when I started putting out records."

In June 2016, two days after the mass killing of LGBT people and their allies at Pulse Orlando, Lynn and Mari released a new charity single from the record titled "Go There When You Want To Be Loved" in support of the families and survivors most impacted by the tragedy. Lynn and Mari donated 100% of the proceeds to recovery efforts with Orlando's gay community. In a feature story and interview with Myspace Music the week of the release, Lynn said “I’m a gay man, so I can’t donate blood, even to save other gay men who are dying because they are losing their own blood, so it felt very much like I needed to do something other than sit on my hands. I wrote the song about feeling like I didn’t have a safe place in the world; This feeling like I’m a man without a country, I’m a man without a place to go.”

On July 1, 2016, the pre-order for Adieu. went live alongside a new single, "Can You Get Me Off?" This was the fifth of the fifteen new songs on the record to be released. Later that same month, Lynn and Mohr shot an interview about Adieu., mental health and other topics at iHeartMedia Portland. In a long-form review of the album published on Lynn's website, Mohr was quoted as saying "Logan Lynn's Adieu is a victory for the broken bones and bruised hearts that support our heavy souls. Impossibly, yet beautifully, Adieu makes no claims to anything other than a simple truth: Life is awful, until it's not. For anyone that has ever felt disconnected, unheard, under-appreciated or unrequited, this is the album to hold tightly to your chest. A+", about the record.

In the September 2016 issue of Spain's Mondo Sonoro Magazine, Adieu. was selected as a red star new release pick alongside Frank Ocean. They gave the album 7 out of 10 stars. That same month, New Noise Magazine wrote "Logan Lynn Brings Back 90s College Rock" in their review of the record. The September issue of Blurt Magazine gave the album 4 out of 5 stars, and NBC's "Live at 7" called the record "masterful" during a segment with Lynn and Producer Gino Mari. The week after the album was released, Willamette Week ran a feature story on Lynn and the old Portland music scene he grew up in with Elliott Smith and The Dandy Warhols. The piece was focused on the release of Adieu., which the publication called his "most uncomfortable album yet".

On January 1, 2017, Blurt Music Magazine named Adieu. one of the Top 10 Albums of 2016. Later that month, INsite Atlanta Entertainment Magazine picked the record as one of their "Top 5 Albums of the Year", stating "Adieu. is quite possibly Logan Lynn’s best album yet, as each song here builds on the next for an impressively cohesive set, ending in the brilliantly wry "Oh, Lucifer". Despite a mix of up tempo indie pop and more introspective piano tracks they fit together beautifully. Lynn continues to impress eight records into his career."

On January 27th, 2017 Adieu. was featured as "Vinyl of the Week" by Forestpunk music blog. In their review of the album, they wrote "Taken at the surface level, Adieu would simply be another peppy, upbeat synth-pop record – albeit a very good one – with sharp, tight arrangements and eloquent lyrics. Diving into the lyric sheet cracks the shiny veneer, revealing an unexpected darkness, as Lynn peels off his skin, to share his shredded nerves and modern-day anxieties, delving into the seamy, sleazy side of life, while sounding like a Threepenny Opera. The melodicism and catchy arrangements – like the toppling piano chords and pots-and-pans percussion of 'Go There When You Want To Be Loved' – are a perfect microcosm of what makes this album so exceptional, so unique, so palatable. Lynn laces the abyss with a wheelbarrow full of sugary Indie Pop."

In February 2017, Disarm Magazine named Adieu. one of the 10 "Best Albums of 2016" and published a long-form, in-depth review of the album, stating "Logan Lynn's double album is the defiant, insistent & powerful work of a years' long incubating process, a thoughtful self-interrogation that pulls light out of darkness and healing out of grief, addiction and pain with subtlety, nuance, humor, and lively melodies."

The album was reviewed in the March 2017 issue of Ghettoblaster Magazine, where it received 4 out of 5 stars. In the review, Ghettoblaster wrote that Logan Lynn is "Like a pride-parade rock band fronted by a former Christian fundie superhero schooled in the finer points of Brian Wilson and The Dandy Warhols, who had the power-pop potential to become something resembling an Indie/Glam Macklemore/Owl City hybrid."

== Music videos ==
On September 30, 2014, Lynn and Mari released the "We Will Overcome" music video in support of the single of the same name. The video was directed by Lynn's longtime live drummer Andrew Carreon of The Gentry, and featuring vintage super 8 family film clips spliced together with studio clips of Lynn. The exclusive world premiere was hosted by Vortex Music Magazine. Visual artist Dandy Jon collaborated with Logan Lynn on an illustrated video for the B-side of the We Will Overcome single, Break Me Down, which was first leaked online in October 2015, then officially released March 8, 2016. Both videos were produced by Logan Lynn Music.

The music video for "The One" was released on January 1, 2016, and features both Lynn and Mari. The video was directed by Grammy Award-winning musician and producer Matt Alber. With the release of "The One", Lynn also announced that his eighth studio album, Adieu. would be released in Summer 2016.

Lynn released his twentieth music video, "Go There When You Want to Be Loved", the fourth video from Adieu. on August 23, 2016. The video was produced by Molly Preston and Directed by Kevin Forrest of Portland Film Works and made its world premiere on Logo TV's NewNowNext, which called the video "an experiment in unbridled joy".

On January 20, 2017, Lynn released a music video for "Oh, Lucifer", Adieu.'s final track. Logo TV premiered the video and said "Logan Lynn Is reclaiming hell as a safe space for queers" and "skewers the religious right in a most devious way" about the release. The video was produced and directed by Kevin Forrest of Portland Film Works and stars Lynn and producer Gino Mari alongside a cast of puppets, including George Michael, Freddie Mercury and David Bowie. In the video, Lynn and Mari are seen saving LGBT youth from Rev. Fred Phelps of the Westboro Baptist Church and giving him electroshock therapy, freeing parishioners from murderous cult leader Jim Jones and putting Donald Trump in prison. Lynn released "Oh, Lucifer" on Inauguration Day in protest of the President Elect.

== Track listing ==
No.	Title	Length
1.	"I Like It All the Time"	3:02
2.	"Go There When You Want to Be Loved"	4:01
3.	"Can You Get Me Off?"	4:15
4.	"Yes, But Why?"	4:00
5.	"I Am Like a Dog Now"	4:32
6.	"The One (Album Version)"	4:30
7.	"Before the Truth Comes Out"	3:26
8.	"The Most Wrong in the Whole World"	3:29
9.	"Way Out"	3:27
10.	"Paris, Edinburgh, Damascus, Oakland"	4:20
11.	"Break Me Down"	3:43
12.	"Wandering the Kingdom"	5:13
13.	"We Will Overcome"	4:25
14.	"Let's Go Home"	3:36
15.	"Narcissus Maximus"	8:15
16.	"Adieu"	4:54
17.	"Oh, Lucifer"	4:52

== Awards ==
Year	Award	Category	Work	Result
2016	Blurt Magazine (US)	Top 10 Albums of 2016	Adieu.	Won
2016	INsite Atlanta Entertainment Magazine (US)	Top 5 Albums of 2016	Adieu.	Won
2016	Disarm Magazine (US)	10 Best Albums of 2016	Adieu.	Won
2016	Disarm Magazine (US)	Best Music of 2016	Adieu.	Won
2017	National Council for Behavioral Health (US)	Excellence in Artistic Expression	Adieu.	Won
