= Get Off (The Dandy Warhols song) =

2000 single by The Dandy Warhols

Single by The Dandy Warhols

from the album Thirteen Tales from Urban Bohemia
- Released: May 2000
- Genre: Power pop
- Length: 3:10
- Label: Capitol
- Songwriter(s): Courtney Taylor-Taylor
- Producer(s): Dave Sardy; Courtney Taylor-Taylor; Gregg Williams

The Dandy Warhols singles chronology
"Not If You Were the Last Junkie on Earth" (1997)	"Get Off" (2000)	"Bohemian Like You" (2000)

"Get Off" is a song by American rock band The Dandy Warhols. It was released in 2000 as the first single from their third studio album, Thirteen Tales from Urban Bohemia, and was re-released in 2002.

== Release ==
"Get Off" peaked at No. 38 on the UK Singles Chart in 2000 and No. 34 when it was re-released in 2002.

== Reception ==
NME wrote that the song sounds like "a thousand Sioux Indians invading the whorehouse at the High Chaparal for a bongs'n'blow jobs toga keg party", commenting "does it really take a major bastard ad campaign for the radio big knobs to spot a decent tune when it chews their fucking faces off?", in reference to The Dandy Warhols' relative obscurity prior to having their song "Bohemian Like You" featured in a Vodafone advert.

== Music video ==
The video was filmed in Portland in April 2000. Scenes of the band members riding horses were filmed on St. Johns Bridge in northwest Portland on April 9, and scenes of them tethering horses, hanging out in a club, and performing in a room with an American flag background were filmed on April 11. The bridge scenes had to be filmed very early on a Sunday morning so the bridge closure wouldn't affect traffic or fishermen.

== Track listing ==
All tracks written and composed by Courtney Taylor-Taylor, except where indicated.

7" vinyl
No.	Title	Length
1.	"Get Off"	3:10
2.	"White Gold"	4:09

CD 1
No.	Title	Length
1.	"Get Off"	3:10
2.	"White Gold"	4:09
3.	"Phone Call"	4:02

CD 2
No.	Title	Length
1.	"Get Off"	3:10
2.	"Not If You Were the Last Junkie on Earth" (recorded live at the 1999 Reading Festival)	3:14
3.	"I Love You" (recorded live at the 1999 Reading Festival)	4:20

2002 7" vinyl re-release
No.	Title	Writer(s)	Length
1.	"Get Off"		3:12
2.	"Eight Days a Week" (acoustic version; recorded at Virgin Radio Studios on 7 November 2001, The Beatles cover)	John Lennon, Paul McCartney	3:31

2002 CD re-release
No.	Title	Writer(s)	Length
1.	"Get Off"		3:12
2.	"Stars" (acoustic version; recorded at Virgin Radio Studios on 7 November 2001; The Brian Jonestown Massacre cover)	Anton Newcombe	4:27
3.	"Eight Days a Week" (acoustic version; recorded at Virgin Radio Studios on 7 November 2001; The Beatles cover)	John Lennon, Paul McCartney	3:31
4.	"Get Off" (CD-ROM video)

== Charts ==
Chart performance for "Get Off"
Chart (2000)	Peak position
Scotland (OCC)	35
UK Singles (OCC)	34
