= The Hugs =

American band

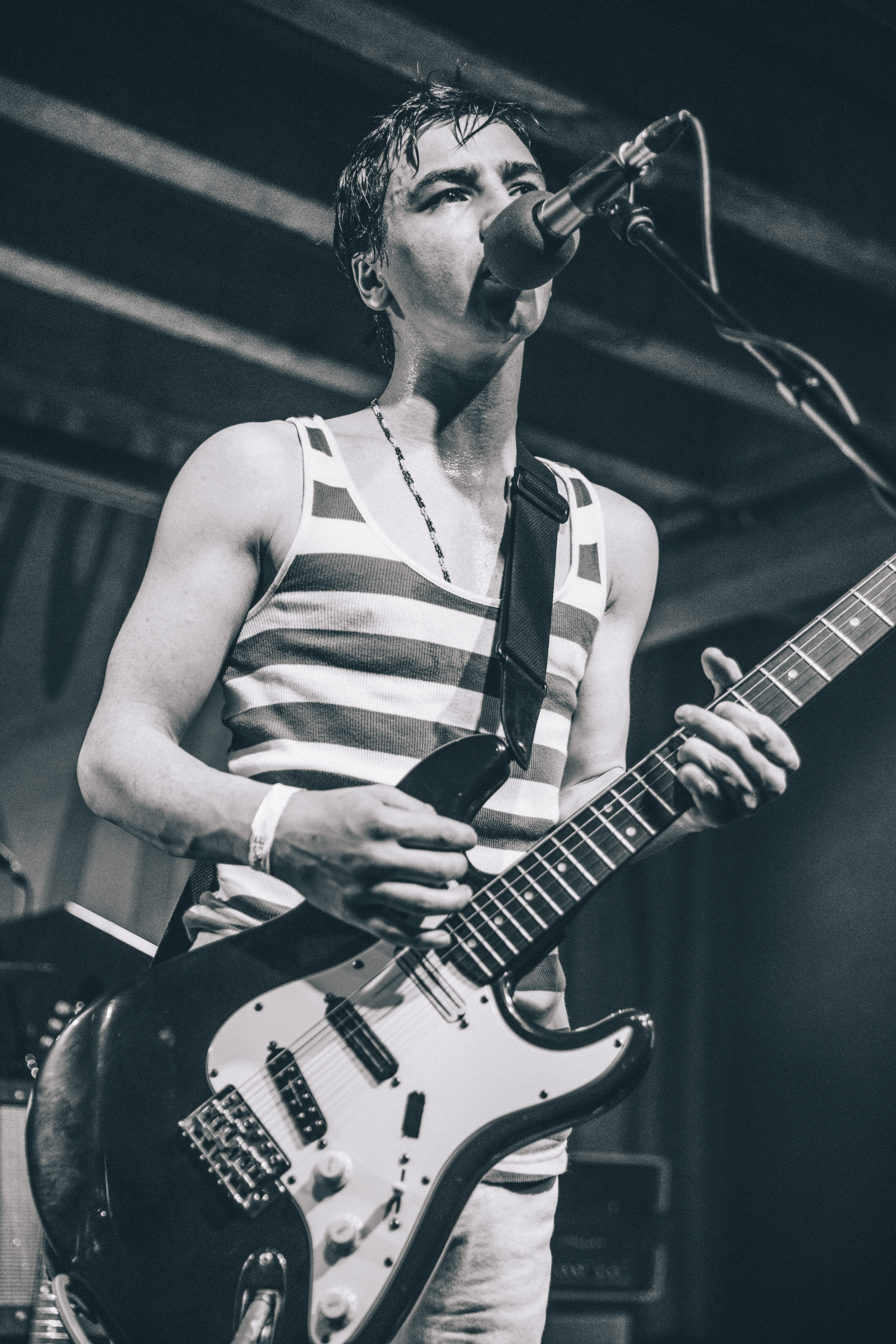
- The Hugs at the Doug Fir Lounge in 2019

Background information
- Origin: Portland, Oregon, USA
- Genres: indie pop; garage rock; electronic; neo-psychedelia; indie rock; synth pop
- Years active: 2007–present
- Labels: 1965 Records, Columbia, Sony BMG
- Members: Danny Delegato
- Website: http://thehugsportland.com/

The Hugs are an American indie pop and psychedelic garage rock band from Portland, Oregon, formed in 2007 by lead singer-songwriter Danny Delegato, while attending Cleveland High School. A self-described "pop" band, their music is primarily influenced by the 1960s British Invasion movement and post-punk. The Hugs have self-released nine studio albums.

== Early years, signing and splitting with Columbia Records ==
The band gained recognition after being signed by major label Columbia Records in the United Kingdom and 1965 Records. The band was discovered on MySpace by famous rock photographer Roger Sargent of NME magazine. Label A&R executives Mike Smith alongside 1965 Records founder James Endeacott who first signed The Libertines and The Strokes signed The Hugs together in 2007. The band enjoyed extensive exposure in London, England, thanks to a busy English touring schedule and a substantial backing from Sony BMG at the time. In 2008 recording sessions with Liam Watson at Toe Rag Studios in Hackney, London began but the recording sessions of 9 songs were later declined by the label for release. In 2009 The Hugs were released from their recording contract and have been releasing albums independently since.

In 2007 Portland Mercury wrote "Not too long ago, Roger Sargent—one of the two British music industry legends in question—was advised to set up a MySpace page in order to "reach out" to fans of a new photo book he had just published on the Libertines. Sargent's music industry notoriety comes from behind a camera's lens (the Guardian UK called him "The UK's most important music photographer"), as he is known for his portraits of Oasis, Franz Ferdinand, and Bloc Party. Speaking of his first introduction-via-MySpace to the kids from Cleveland High, "I got a somewhat cryptic message from a band calling themselves D&K. It was so annoyingly cryptic I had to check it out. The first song played and I was hooked, but the only thing was, I thought it was some kind of hoax. There was no way this music could be made by school kids."

== Regional and national critical acclaim ==
In 2007 Carl Barât, singer-songwriter of The Libertines, stated in London-based music magazine NME "I love The Hugs from Portland, Oregon. They're kind of like The Libertines but are taking it all from their own direction. They're a band who really know how to put a tune together and I'm totally dead excited about them."

In 2007 NME Magazine wrote "With their swooshing swathes of rainbow rock, The Hugs are further proof that someone's certainly putting something in the water in Portland, Oregon. Like The Lemonheads but with more primal yelping, the moment when their retro-referencing tunes seem to be veering too much in a pleasant, palatable garage-punk direction, their teeny weeny singer Danny Delegato – the lovechild of Noel Fielding and one of The Monkees – lets go a grave-spinning, throat-slashing screech before indulging in some energetic and muscle-tearing mic-robatics. It's still early days for the festive shebang, so sadly only a few punters catch the sight of Delegato half-heartedly trashing his guitar at the end of the set. You can almost pinpoint the exact second where he realises he's going to have to dive into the band's emergency tour fund to buy a new one. It's not a pretty sight."

In 2009 acclaimed movie director Gus Van Sant stated in an online New York Post magazine article, "there's a band called The Hugs that I like a lot, they play folk rock, they're a Portland band, I really like their songs.

In 2009 Interview Magazine wrote: "The Hugs are a four-piece rock ’n’ roll band from Portland, Oregon, who recorded their debut album in England. This makes sense because their music sounds British—not “Greensleeves” British, but rather the brand of British that became popular when groups like The Kinks and The Yardbirds invaded America in the mid-’60s with their ramshackle lyrics and bluesy riffs. The Hugs's music, though, is also very Oregonian, owing an equal debt to home-state forerunners like "Louie Louie" auteurs The Kingsmen and the late-’70s pre-grunge grunge outfit The Wipers. Our woman in Portland, Paige Powell, met up with The Hugs after a practice session, crowding into a beat-up tour van with singer-guitarist Danny Delegato, as well as a bunch of their fans."

Portland Mercury stated "You can put that NME cover on hold for now, as their rise to stardom will, at best, be a slow and gradual ascent. But under the floppy bangs and slouched teenage shoulders lies a group of kids on the cusp of something great. Much like the early forbearers of the jangly Brit-rock sound, The Hugs have a loose charm, a perfectly content sense of confidence that permeates throughout their sound, no matter how sloppy it might be at the time. Their music has the rough kinetic energy of Slanted and Enchanted-era Pavement, and the haphazard punk of (pre-crack and tabloids) The Libertines."

== Use in media ==
- On August 20, 2011 The Hugs song titled "Never Gonna Live, Never Going To Die" was featured on ABC Family show The Lying Game.
- On December 15, 2011, The Hugs song titled "In Love" was featured on an online winter Gap Inc. sweater ad.
- On August 2, 2012, The Hugs song titled "In Love" was featured on MTV television show Awkward.
- On January 12, 2013, The Hugs song titled "In Love" was featured on Tutti Rouge lingerie advert for Autumn.
- On December 11, 2014, The Hugs titled "In Love" was featured on Slednecks.
- On March 18, 2015, The Hugs song titled "Come Close" was featured on Lena Dunham HBO T.V. show Girls season 4 episode 8.
- On October 9, 2017, The Hugs song titled "Laws" was featured on Teen Mom 2 on MTV season 8 episode 15 "Love You, Mean it".
- On May 9, 2024, The Hugs song titled "Mile High Lady" was featured on 9-1-1 on ABC network season 7 episode 7 "Ghost of A Second Chance".

== Current members ==
- Danny Delegato - lead vocals, guitar, songwriter, founder (2007–present)

== Discography ==
=== 2007–2008: The Hugs self-titled debut ===
In mid-2007, The Hugs were signed to 1965 Records, a subsidiary label of Columbia Records UK, on which they released their debut self-titled The Hugs full-length album in January 2007. The Hugs experimented with vintage recording equipment and a treasure trove of vintage guitars, pedals, and most notable a rare Otari 2' inch tape deck. Producer and engineer Shay Scott adapted 1970's recording techniques using a vintage Neve console and rare 1960's preamps and outboard gear. The album garnered comparisons to The Strokes, The Lemonheads, The Dandy Warhols and The Libertines. Singer Danny Delegato refers to the album's subject matter as "personal sentiments, high school love, and growing into your early twenty's". Tours and support slots supporting The Walkmen, The View, The Rascals, The Brian Jonestown Massacre, The Dandy Warhols, Dirty Pretty Things, The Cribs and The Kooks followed the album's release. Receiving critical acclaim by NME, Interview Magazine, Portland Mercury, Willamette Week and movie-director Gus Van Sant in the New York Post.

=== 2009–2011: Again and Again ===
The Hugs second album, Again and Again, was released on October 6, 2009. The album was recorded w/producer and engineer Shay Scott in Portland, Oregon at his home studio "Klickitat Band Camp". Again and Again marked a stylistic departure from the previous album in that it was made up of song demos recorded in England and Europe, namely London and Paris, and contained all songs written while demoing for Columbia Records UK. Singer Danny Delegato cites youth, travel, The Monkees, The Vines and obscure 60's psychedelic rock as primarily influences.

=== 2013–2015: Love Led You Here ===
The Hugs released Love Led You Here, their third studio album, on July 30, 2013. The album marked a further departure in sound from previous releases with a guitar-based pop and alternative sound, shoegazey-soundscapes and distorted guitars.

=== 2016–2018: Feelings of Life ===
In March 2016, The Hugs released Feelings of Life, the band's fourth studio album, recorded in Portland, Oregon. The band added multi-instrumentalist David Appaloosa on guitar, vocals and producing duties. Feelings of Life marked another big stylistic departure from the previous album, introducing more programmed drums, anthemic hooks, and commercial pop and rock leanings. The tracks were recorded at Map Room Studio in Portland, Oregon and self-produced. Mixing by Sonny Diperri, whose credits include: Trent Reznor, STRFKR, Animal Collective, and Portugal. The Man. Northwest Music Scene Magazine wrote "This album takes you on a journey that is warm, a little exploratory, familiar, and full of great tunes. Much like life, Feelings of Life encompasses many of the feelings felt on this shared journey."

=== 2019–2020: Love You to Death ===
The Hugs released their 5th studio album, Love You to Death, on April 12, 2019, arguably the most pop-influenced The Hugs album to date. Tracks like "Who Loved You" and "Mile High Lady" showcase the continued pop, rock n' roll, and 90's garage influence that is woven through the entire The Hugs discography. Willamette Week stated "the Hugs are masters of synthesis who know how to push all the right buttons at all the right times. When your songwriting and production are as airtight as they are here, reinventing the wheel takes a backseat to squeezing as much excitement as possible out of a formula that's been tried and true for decades." The Album was engineered and co-produced by Brandon Egglesston at The Dandy Warhols warehouse studio "The Oddy" in Portland, Oregon. With additional mixing by Sonny Diperri (STRFKR, Portugal The Man). Tours and support slots supporting The Kooks, Finn Wolfhard of Calpurnia followed the albums release.

=== 2021: Dirty Gems LP (Reissue) ===
On December 7, 2021, The Hugs announced a reissue and 6th studio album, Dirty Gems. Alongside the release of its first two singles, "Dot Dot" and "Reykjavik". The album was produced, mixed and engineered by long-time producer Shay Scott in Portland, Oregon. Drawing inspiration from guitar bands such as The Strokes and Television.

=== 2022–2023: True to Your Own Spirit ===
On June 3, 2022, The Hugs announced their seventh studio album, True to Your Own Spirit. Alongside the release of its first two singles, "Singing Out My Window" and "In the Dead Black Night". Two more singles, "Sad Place" and "Witness", were released that year respectively. The album was mixed by The Strokes producer Gordon Raphael in Hebden Bridge, England. OPB wrote "The group's latest single, “In the Dead Black Night,” was recorded with assistance from producer/mixer Gordon Raphael (The Strokes, Regina Spektor). Here, the band deftly matches a catchy funk beat and the hopeful lyrics of a traditional pop song with painfully beautiful vocals and an ominous instrumental undertone."

=== 2024–2025: New Adventure ===
On February 2, 2024, The Hugs announced their eighth studio album, New Adventure. Alongside the release of its first two singles, "Till You're Gone" and "From The Stars". The album was co-produced by Danny Delegato & Ben Stager in Portland, and recorded in parts of the rural Oregon coast. The album was mastered at Svenska Grammofon Studio by Frida Johansson in Gothenburg, Sweden. Drawing unique inspiration from singer songwriter Beck, MGMT and 90's synth pop. Further explaining the bands new outlook and sound with Eugene Weekly, Danny Delegato said: “We’re trying to go into the future of music, I’ve always written in different genres, no matter what though I like the idea of writing really great pop songs and keeping it simple.” As far as the influence of post hip-hop singer-songwriter Beck, Delegato says, “I like how he has an ethos of ‘Try anything once.’ We tried to do that on this new album. A lot of stuff was mysteriously working. It's all good timing.”

=== 2026–present: Waking Up In The Future ===
On June 5th, 2026, The Hugs announced their 9th studio album, Waking Up In The Future. Alongside the release of its first three singles, "Forever Beyond", "Am I Dreaming" and "Bump In The Night". Waking Up in the Future is the ninth studio album by Portland, Oregon alternative pop band The Hugs, released on June 5, 2026. Influenced by Britpop, alternative pop, futuristic themes and electronic music, the album explores themes of time, romance, and optimism through a blend of guitar-pop driven songwriting, electronic textures, and cinematic production.

The album was produced by Danny Delegato and Isaak Boornstein, who also handled mixing and drum programming. It was recorded in Portland, Oregon, and mastered by Gus Elg at Sky Onion Mastering. The artwork was created by Phoebe Mandles, with layout by Sean Allen and album art photography by Isabelle Baumgartner.

Danny Delegato performed lead vocals, guitar, bass, drums, synthesizers, and strings, while Isaak Boornstein contributed guitar, backing vocals, synthesizers, and drum programming.

=== Albums and EPs ===
- "The Hugs" (Self Titled) (7 May 2007)
- "Again And Again" (6 October 2009)
- "Love Led You Here" (30 July 2013)
- "Feelings of Life" (25 March 2016)
- "Love You To Death" (12 April 2019)
- "Dirty Gems" (10 December 2021)
- "True To Your Own Spirit" (3 June 2022)
- "New Adventure" (2 February 2024)
- "Waking Up In The Future" (5 June 2026)

=== Singles ===
- "North" (9 March 2007)
- "Palm Trees" (15 June 2007)
- "She Was High" (3 August 2009)
- "Ego's" (9 November 2009)
- "Reykjavik" (5 July 2012)
- "Dot Dot" (7 August 2012)
- "Magnify" (2 July 2013)
- "Let It Go" (12 November 2013)
- "Wherever You Go" (7 January 2016)
- "Story Books" (15 September 2016)
- "Tunnel" (14 April 2017)
- "Fearless" (3 November 2017)
- "Want You Now" (26 December 2017)
- "Mile High Lady" (18 March 2019)
- "Love You To Death" (1 September 2019)
- "Friends Can Break Your Heart" (19 June 2020)
- "Future Nostalgia" (27 November 2020)
- "On And On" (4 May 2021)
- "In The Dead Black Night" (21 May 2021)
- "Où Tu Sais" (11 June 2021)
- "Singing Out My Window" (16 July 2021)
- "Great Bolongo Beat" (21 August 2021)
- "Witness" (24 September 2021)
- "Strangers Lost" (26 January 2022)
- "Sad Place" " (2 June 2022)
- "Till You're Gone" " (23 June 2023)
- "From The Stars" " (4 August 2023)
- "Next To The Sea " (8 October 2023)
- "Am I Dreaming " (6 September 2024)
- "Love Me Three Times" Feat. Tio Nacho's House (22 May 2025)
- "Forever Beyond" (5 December 2025)
- "Bump in the Night" (12 March 2026)
