= Comp 175: A Benefit for Queer Programs and Services in the Pacific Northwest =

Comp 175: A Benefit for Queer Programs & Services in the Pacific Northwest

Box set by Logan Lynn
- Released: November 27, 2012
- Recorded: 2012
- Genres: Dance, pop, electronic, techno, alternative, indie
- Label: Logan Lynn
- Producer: Logan Lynn

Logan Lynn chronology
Do You Want Me Or Not? (2012)	Comp 175: A Benefit for Queer Programs & Services in the Pacific Northwest (2012)	Tramp Stamps and Birthmarks (2012)

Comp 175: A Benefit for Queer Programs & Services in the Pacific Northwest is a 45 song, 3 disc charity compilation record produced by Logan Lynn and released on his label, Logan Lynn Music, on November 27, 2012. Artists featured on "Comp 175" include Logan Lynn, Peaches, Matt Alber, God-Des & She, Magic Mouth, Scream Club, Christeene and dozens of other LGBTQ and allied acts, 36 in all. 100% of all proceeds from this album go to charity.

== Charity ==
On November 27, 2012 Portland musician Logan Lynn Produced and released a compilation record titled "Comp 175: A Benefit for Queer Programs and Services in the Pacific Northwest" which featured 36 bands across 45 songs. The 3-disc set was sold for $15 and to this day, 100% of the proceeds from the record go directly to benefit the work of Q Center, which operates both the LGBTQ Community Center and the Sexual & Gender Minority Youth Resource Center (SMYRC) in Portland, Oregon. The tagline seen in all promotional materials for the album read "Your purchase of this record helps to ensure that the important work of this vital community resource continues." The day the album was released, Logan Lynn, Jeb Havens and Kelly Moe appeared together on a live broadcast of Out Loud Radio, where they were each interviewed about the charity.

== Concept ==
Paragraph 175, also known as "Section 175", was a provision of the German Criminal Code from 1871 to 1994, making homosexuality a crime. Over 140,000 people were convicted under the law. The Nazis broadened the law in 1935 and thousands died in concentration camps in the prosecutions that followed. According to producer Logan Lynn, "Comp 175" was given its title because "Today, all over the world, the fight for LGBTQ freedom and equality is not yet won."

== Featured Artists ==
- Logan Lynn
- Peaches
- Scream Club
- Matt Alber
- God-Des & She
- Magic Mouth
- Christeene
- Tom Goss
- Bobby Jo Valentine
- Shunda K
- Nicky Click
- Brett Gleason
- Jeremy Gloff
- Deluxe
- Houston Bernard
- Kelly Moe
- Atole
- Mattachine Social
- The Sexbots
- Kimono Kops
- Jeb Havens
- Towering Trees
- Noah Daniel Wood
- Barbi Crash
- Kerry Hallett
- Katrina Skalland
- Blue Redder
- L10
- Microfilm
- Jana Fisher
- A Million Tiny Architects
- Matthew Mercer
- Stephan Nance
- Marshall J. Pierce
- Jonny
- Alternate Destination

== Track listings ==
=== Disc 1 ===
No.	Title	Length
1.	"Deluxe: "An Evening Alone""	4:01
2.	"Matt Alber: "Tightrope""	4:30
3.	"Logan Lynn: "Do You Want Me Or Not?""	3:41
4.	"Scream Club, Peaches, Shunda K, and Nicky Click: "Billionaire (Remix)""	3:53
5.	"Atole: "Tonya""	3:52
6.	"God-Des & She: "God, I Know You Love Me""	3:40
7.	"Magic Mouth: "Wash It Off""	5:20
8.	"Christeene: "Tropical Abortion""	3:43
9.	"Kimono Kops: "A Shotgun Cottage""	3:59
10.	"Jeremy Gloff: "Outsiders""	3:44
11.	"Kerry Hallett: "Easy Go""	2:43
12.	"Bobby Jo Valentine: "Home""	4:00
13.	"Jana Fisher: "If I Ever Break Your Heart""	3:21
14.	"A Million Tiny Architects: "Lost In Oscillations""	4:22
15.	"Jeb Havens: "Parachute""	2:59

=== Disc 2 ===
No.	Title	Length
1.	"Mattachine Social: "Star Box""	4:16
2.	"Tom Goss: "Seems Like Yesterday""	3:01
3.	"Logan Lynn: "Turn Me Out (Modern Remix)""	6:15
4.	"Kelly Moe: "Collide Into You (Bovine Remix)""	4:30
5.	"L10: "Oh Yeah!""	3:49
6.	"Brett Gleason: "Polarity""	3:46
7.	"The Sexbots: "Solar Power""	3:35
8.	"Magic Mouth: "Hush""	4:34
9.	"Houston Bernard: "14 14 LUV""	3:46
10.	"Noah Daniel Wood: "Joshua""	2:04
11.	"Jonny: "The Gay Canon""	4:16
12.	"Microfilm: "B.F.F.""	3:15
13.	"Blue Redder: "Seahorse""	4:38
14.	"Jeb Havens: "Wake Up Call""	3:11
15.	"Logan Lynn "Alone Together (Boy In Static Remix)""	3:30

=== Disc 3 ===
No.	Title	Length
1.	"Bobby Jo Valentine: "Gunshot""	3:10
2.	"Katrina Skalland: "Kiss You""	4:04
3.	"Towering Trees: "Brandy Alexander""	3:18
4.	"Barbi Crash: "Talk Shit""	3:30
5.	"Atole: "Maximal Techno""	5:01
6.	"Matthew Mercer: "Swallowing Stars""	5:08
7.	"Kerry Hallett: "Hating Nothing""	2:25
8.	"Marshall J.: "Damn It All""	3:53
9.	"Stephan Nance: "Firecracker""	3:57
10.	"Noah Daniel Wood: "Eli Wants A High Five""	4:22
11.	"Mattachine Social: "Lovers""	4:08
12.	"Brett Gleason: "Unruddered (Dead Red Velvet Remix)""	4:26
13.	"Houston Bernard: "Love (Matt Moss Vocal Mix)""	7:51
14.	"Logan Lynn: Tramp Stamps and Birthmarks"	3:43
15.	"Alternate Destination: "July""	4:38
