= Sure Love (Jarryd James song) =

Single by Jarryd James

from the album Thirty One
- Released: 4 August 2015
- Recorded: 2015
- Genre: Indie pop; pop
- Length: 3:41
- Label: Dryden Street, Universal Music Australia
- Songwriter(s): Jarryd Klapper, Pip Norman
- Producer(s): Malay

Jarryd James singles chronology
"Regardless" (2015)	"Sure Love" (2015)	"1000x" (2016)

"Sure Love" is a single by Australian singer-songwriter Jarryd James. It was released on August 4, 2015 and is the fourth single taken from James' debut studio album, Thirty One.

The track was produced by Malay who's previously worked with Frank Ocean. Outside of Australia the song was promoted alongside the Jarryd James (EP).

== Reviews ==
Aliyah Allen of Notion Magazine said:""Sure Love" is a beautiful track in its entirety; consisting of a smooth, mellow beat and accompanied with soul-infused, RnB vocals, it makes for laid back listening. With similar sounds to James Blake and Louis Mattrs, Jarryd’s range is one to be reckoned with."

Pip Ellwood-Hughes of Entertainment Focus said ""Sure Love" is a dreamy track that showcases Jarryd’s impressive vocal range and firmly establishes who he is as an artist".

Digital Spy said "The song is a silky R&B number with jangly percussion that flickers like a wind chime. It's all very nice."

Chuck Campbell of knoxnews (n a review of the Jarryd James EP) said, "he emerges with a sense of measured optimism on “Sure Love,” puncturing through layers of overdubbed vocals to land squarely at the center of the hazy, hypnotic ambience."

== Track listing ==
1. "Sure Love" – 3:41

== Release history ==
Country	Date	Format	Label
Australia	4 August 2015	Digital download	Dryden Street, Universal Music Australia
