= Plan A (The Dandy Warhols song) =

Single by The Dandy Warhols

from the album Welcome to the Monkey House
- Released: November 24, 2003
- Length: 4:04
- Label: Capitol
- Songwriter(s): Courtney Taylor-Taylor

The Dandy Warhols singles chronology
"You Were the Last High" (2003)	"Plan A" (2003)	"Horny as a Dandy" (2006)

Professional ratings
Review scores
Source	Rating
AllMusic	3/5 stars

"Plan A" is a song by American rock band The Dandy Warhols. It was released as the third single from their fourth studio album, Welcome to the Monkey House, on November 24, 2003. It peaked at No. 66 on the UK Singles Chart.

== Track listing ==
CD
No.	Title	Writer(s)	Length
1.	"Plan A"		4:04
2.	"The Jean Genie" (David Bowie cover)	David Bowie	2:14
3.	"You Were the Last High" (Dirty Vegas Dub Mix)		7:25
4.	"Plan A" (video)		4:04

7" vinyl

1. "Plan A"
2. "The Jean Genie"

== Charts ==
Chart performance for "Plan A"
Chart (2003)	Peak position
Scotland (OCC)	78
UK Singles (OCC)	66
