= Tramp Stamps and Birthmarks =

Studio album by Logan Lynn
- Released: December 4, 2012
- Recorded: 2010–2012
- Genre: Electropop
- Label: Logan Lynn Music
- Producer: Gino Mari

Logan Lynn chronology
Comp 175: A Benefit for Queer Programs and Services in the Pacific Northwest (album) (2012)	Tramp Stamps and Birthmarks (2012)	Dance Alone (EP) (2013)

Tramp Stamps and Birthmarks is a ten song album released by Logan Lynn on December 4, 2012.

== Album ==
Lynn released Tramp Stamps and Birthmarks on December 4, 2012, on his own label, Logan Lynn Music. Produced by Gino Mari and recorded and mixed at The Country Club studios in Portland, the record has collaborations with the Los Angeles electropop band Father Tiger, David Appaloosa from the Portland indie boyband The Hugs, Spencer Lee Carroll from the DJ duo LackLustre, The Gentry, Rowan Wren, Noah Daniel Wood and others. The album debuted at #93 on the iTunes Pop 100 to critical praise.

Tramp Stamps and Birthmarks was named "Album of the Year" by several media outlets.

On April 1, 2014, Lynn released a limited edition compact disc version of the album on his own label.

== Music videos ==
In January 2013, Lynn released the music video for "Hologram", directed by Adrian Sotomayor and Aaron Bear and produced by Logan Lynn Music. The video showed a gay man-turned-hologram and a live performance by Lynn, and was filmed in both Seattle and Portland. It was premiered on Out magazine's website.

In August 2012, Lynn released a music video for his next single from Tramp Stamps and Birthmarks, titled "Everything You Touch Turns To Gold", for the album version of the song. The video was produced by Logan Lynn Music and directed by Rowan Wren, who also sings lead vocals on the duet with Lynn on the record, and showed Lynn and Wren with metal sculpture work by the Portland artist Christopher Truax. The video was premiered on Out magazine's website and was picked up by media from there.

On October 31, 2013, Lynn released a music video for the album's title track, "Tramp Stamps and Birthmarks". The video was directed by Kevin Forrest and Ben Starkey and was produced by Hippodrome Media and Logan Lynn Music. It was shown up by several media outlets and showed a kidnapped Lynn in a dog cage in the woods spliced with scenes of his kidnapper and scenes of him tied up in the back of an RV that has been completely lined with black trash bags. The "Tramp Stamps and Birthmarks" video was watched over half a million times on YouTube during its first 3 months.

In June 2014, Lynn released the fifth single from Tramp Stamps and Birthmarks, titled "Radio Silent". Produced by Logan Lynn Music, the video was directed by the filmmaker Runn Shayo and had behind-the-scenes clips and live performance footage from Lynn's 2013 summer tour of the US.

== Track listing ==
No.	Title	Length
1.	"Tramp Stamps and Birthmarks"	3:43
2.	"Do You Want Me Or Not?"	3:42
3.	"The Ghost of Someone Else"	3:46
4.	"Loud Enough"	2:57
5.	"Turn Me Out (Album Version)"	3:36
6.	"Hologram"	3:21
7.	"Radio Silent"	3:04
8.	"Go Away, Come Closer"	2:21
9.	"Everything You Touch Turns To Gold (Album Version)"	2:42
10.	"Nobody Knows The Trouble I've Seen (A cappella)"	2:37

== Awards ==
Year	Award	Category	Result
2012	Just Out Magazine (US)	Album of the Year 2012	Won
