= Do You Remember (Jarryd James song) =

Single by Jarryd James

from the album Thirty One
- Released: 30 January 2015
- Recorded: 2014
- Genre: Pop; R&B; indie pop
- Length: 3:55
- Label: Jarryd James Music
- Songwriters: Jarryd James; Joel Little
- Producers: Jarryd James, Joel Little

Jarryd James singles chronology
"Do You Remember" (2015)	"Give Me Something" (2015)

Music video
- "Do You Remember" on YouTube

"Do You Remember" is the debut single released from Australian singer-songwriter Jarryd James. The song was written and produced by Jarryd James and Joel Little (who had previously worked with Broods and Lorde). It was released digitally on 30 January 2015. "Do You Remember" debuted at number 44 on the ARIA Singles Chart and peaked at number 2 in its fifth week on the chart. It peaked at number 1 on the AIR chart.

A black and white video was released on YouTube on 8 March 2015.

A remix EP was released on 12 February 2016.

At the Queensland Music Awards of 2016, "Do You Remember" won Highest Selling Single.

== Reviews ==
Mike Wass from Idolator said: "'Do You Remember' is a winning mix of R&B and eerie electronica. It's a refreshingly original sound, but there's an undeniable pop sensibility that still makes it palatable to radio programmers and, as it turns out, the general public."

Chris from Indie Music Filters said: "[Do You Remember] feels like a tastefully subdued cousin of AWOLNation's hit 'Sail', plucked strings and deliberate percussion building to an excellent chorus."

== Track listing ==
One-track single

1. "Do You Remember"

Digital remix single

1. "Do You Remember" (featuring Raury)

Remix EP

1. "Do You Remember" (Noah Breakfast Remix) – 3:41
2. "Do You Remember" (Chet Porter Remix) – 4:35
3. "Do You Remember" (Smle Remix) – 4:00
4. "Do You Remember" (Melé Remix) – 4:21
5. "Do You Remember" (Strange Talk Remix) – 5:07

Digital remix single

1. "Do You Remember" (featuring Grey Remix)

== Charts ==
=== Weekly charts ===
Chart (2015)	Peak position
Australia (ARIA)	2
Australian Independent Singles (AIR)	1
Australian Urban (ARIA)	1
Belgium (Ultratip Bubbling Under Flanders)	24
Belgium (Ultratop 50 Wallonia)	33
Germany (GfK)	78
New Zealand (Recorded Music NZ)	7
Switzerland (Schweizer Hitparade)	73

=== Year-end charts ===
Chart (2015)	Position
Australia (ARIA)	22
Australia Urban (ARIA)	5

== Certifications ==
Region	Certification	Certified units/sales
Australia (ARIA)	4× Platinum	280,000^{‡}
New Zealand (RMNZ)	2× Platinum	60,000^{‡}
^{‡} Sales+streaming figures based on certification alone.

== Release history ==
Country	Date	Format	Label
Australia	30 January 2015	Digital download	Jarryd James Music
