= 2015 New Zealand Music Awards =

Annual New Zealand music awards ceremony

- Awarded for: Excellence in New Zealand music
- Sponsored by: Vodafone
- Date: 19 November 2015
- Location: Vector Arena, Auckland
- Country: New Zealand
- Hosted by: Taika Waititi
- Reward: Tui award trophy
- Website: http://www.nzmusicawards.co.nz

Television/radio coverage
- Network: TV3; The Edge TV

The 2015 New Zealand Music Awards was the 49th holding of the annual ceremony featuring awards for musical recording artists based in or originating from New Zealand. It took place on 19 November 2015 at Vector Arena in Auckland and was hosted by Taika Waititi. The awards show was broadcast live on TV3, and hosted by Sharyn Casey and Dominic Bowden. 2015 marks the 50th anniversary of the awards from its origins in 1965 as the Loxene Golden Disc.

The awards were dominated by Broods, who won Album of the Year, Best Group, Best Pop Album, and Radio Airplay Record of the Year. Marlon Williams won two awards, Best Male Solo Artist and Breakthrough Artist of the Year. Lorde won Single of the Year and shared the International Achievement award with Savage.

== Early awards ==
While most of the awards will be presented at the main awards ceremony held in November, five genre awards were presented earlier in the year at ceremonies of their field.

- The first was awarded in January, with the Tui for Best Folk Album presented at the Auckland Folk Festival in Kumeu to Auckland group Great North for their album Up In Smoke.
- The Tui for Best Jazz Album was presented in April at the National Jazz Festival in Tauranga to Auckland band DOG for their debut album DOG.
- The Best Country Music Album Tui was presented in May at the New Zealand Country Music Awards in Gore to Tami Neilson for her album Dynamite!.
- The Tui for Best Pacific Music Album was presented in June at the Vodafone Pacific Music Awards to the duo Cydel for their album Memoirs of a Midnight Cowboy.
- In August the Best Children's Music Album award was presented live on What Now to fleaBITE for her album The Jungle is Jumping.

The nominees for the three technical awards were announced on 1 October, and the technical award winners, legacy award recipient and the Critics' Choice Prize shortlist were announced on 13 October. The Critics Choice showcase and award presentation will be held on 5 November.

== Controversy ==
During the live broadcast of the main awards ceremony, six awards - including Best Maori Album - were presented during the ad breaks and omitted from the television broadcast. This was criticised by previous NZMA winner Tama Waipara, who described the incident as "disgusting and it's not surprising but it is extremely disappointing and moreover, it's unconstitutional." A Mediaworks spokesperson responded, saying, "We can't broadcast the entire awards ceremony without commercial breaks, so many awards aren't televised."

== Nominees and winners ==
The main nominees were revealed on 13 October 2015. The Best Gospel / Christian Album category was renamed Best Worship Album.

Winners are listed first and highlighted in boldface.

Key
‡ – Technical award

Album of the Year	Single of the Year
Sponsored by Mentos: **Broods – Evergreen**; Marlon Williams – Marlon Williams; Shihad – FVEY; Six60 – Six60 (2); Unknown Mortal Orchestra – Multi-Love	Sponsored by Vodafone: **Lorde – "Yellow Flicker Beat"**; Avalanche City – "Inside Out"; Marlon Williams – "Dark Child"; Six60 – "White Lines"; Unknown Mortal Orchestra – "Multi-Love"
Best Group	Breakthrough Artist of the Year
**Broods – Evergreen**; Shihad – FVEY; Six60 – Six60 (2)	**Marlon Williams**; Devilskin; Ginny Blackmore
Best Male Solo Artist	Best Female Solo Artist
**Marlon Williams – Marlon Williams**; Stan Walker – Truth & Soul; Unknown Mortal Orchestra – Multi-Love	**Gin Wigmore – Blood to Bone**; Anika Moa – Queen at the Table; Brooke Fraser – Brutal Romantic
Best Rock Album	Best Pop Album
**Shihad – FVEY**; Cairo Knife Fight – The Colossus; Devilskin – We Rise	Sponsored by The Edge: **Broods – Evergreen**; Benny Tipene – Bricks; Six60 – Six60 (2)
Best Urban/Hip Hop Album	Best Roots Album
**Janine and the Mixtape – XX**; Diaz Grimm – Osiris; The Doqument]– Black Canvas – Wall & Piece	**TrinityRoots – Citizen**; Latinaotearoa – Latinaotearoa in Latinoamerica; Moana and the Tribe – Rima
Best Alternative Album	Best Māori Album
**Unknown Mortal Orchestra – Multi-Love**; Marlon Williams – Marlon Williams; She's So Rad – Tango	**Ranea – Tihei Mauri Ora**; Moana and the Tribe – Rima; Whaia and the Mahician – Whaia
Best Music Video	Best Electronica Album
Sponsored by NZ On Air: **Shahir Daud – "Cymatics" (Nigel Stanford)**; Reuben Bonner – "Her Heart Breaks Like a Wave" (Dictaphone Blues); Shae Sterling – "Aotearoa" (Stan Walker featuring Ria Hall, Troy Kingi & Maisey Rika)	**Electric Wire Hustle – Love Can Prevail**; Shapeshifter vs The Upbeats – SSXUB; Sola Rosa – Magnetics
Best Worship Album	Best Classical Album
**LIFE Worship – Through the Fire**; Edge Kingsland Presents – Seven Days; We, The Revival – We, The Revival	**Michael Houstoun – Beethoven: Complete Piano Sonatas**; Jack Body – Passing By; Jack Body – Songs of Death and Desire
People's Choice Award	Critics' Choice Prize
Sponsored by Vodafone: **Six60**; Broods; Lorde; Sol3 Mio; Stan Walker	Sponsored by NZ On Air Presented 5 November 2015: **Bespin**; Boycrush; New Gum Sarn
Highest selling New Zealand Single	Highest selling New Zealand Album
**Savage and Timmy Trumpet - "Freaks"**; Broods - "Mother & Father"; Lorde - "Yellow Flicker Beat"; Six60 - "Special"; Six60 - "So High"	No finalists are announced in this category.: **Sol3 Mio - Sol3 Mio**; Broods – Evergreen; Devilskin – We Rise; Lorde - Pure Heroine; Six60 – Six60 (2)
Radio Airplay Record of the Year	International Achievement Award
Sponsored by NZ On Air No finalists are announced in this category.: **Broods - "Mother & Father"**; Benny Tipene - "Step on Up"; Broods - "L.A.F."; Lorde - "Yellow Flicker Beat"; Six60 - "Special"	No finalists are announced in this category.: **Lorde**; **Savage**
Legacy Award	Best Album Cover‡
Sponsored by The New Zealand Herald; No finalists are announced in this category. Announced 13 October 2015: **The Exponents**	Presented 13 October 2015: **Kelvin Soh for Broods - Evergreen**; Alt Group for Shihad - FVEY; Barny Bewick for Cairo Knife Fight - The Colossus
Best Engineer‡	Best Producer‡
Presented 13 October 2015: **Lee Prebble and Oliver Harmer for Mel Parsons - Drylands**; Clint Murphy for Devilskin – We Rise; Evan Short for Shihad - FVEY	Sponsored by Massey University; Presented 13 October 2015: **Sean Donnelly for SJD - Saint John Divine**; Clint Murphy for Devilskin – We Rise; Joel Little for Broods - Evergreen
Best Folk Album	Best Jazz Album
Presented 28 January 2015: **Great North – Up In Smoke**; Flip Grater – Pigalle; Rachel Dawick – The Boundary Riders	Presented 6 April 2015: **DOG – DOG**; The Jac – Nerve; Jonathan Crayford – Dark Light
Best Country Music Album	Best Pacific Music Album
Presented 23 May 2015: **Tami Neilson – Dynamite!**; Delaney Davidson & Marlon Williams – Sad But True Volume 3; Glen Moffatt – Superheroes and Scary Things	Presented 13 June 2015: **Cydel – Memoirs of a Midnight Cowboy**; Team Dynamite – Shepherds Delight; Fiafia Band – Siva Siva Maia
Best Children's Music Album	
Presented 2 August 2015: **fleaBITE – The Jungle is Jumping**; Itty Bitty Beats – Bath Time; Poppet Stars – Poppet Stars	
