= Aotearoa Music Award for Radio Airplay Record of the Year =

Annual New Zealand music award

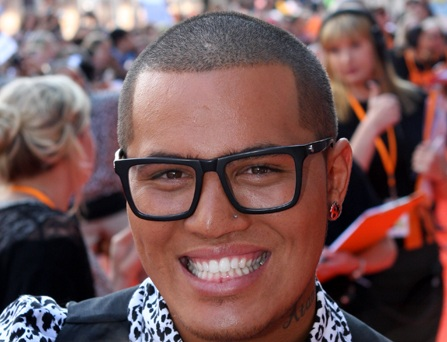
Stan Walker has won three times, with "Black Box" (2010), "Choose You" (2011) and "Take It Easy" (2013).

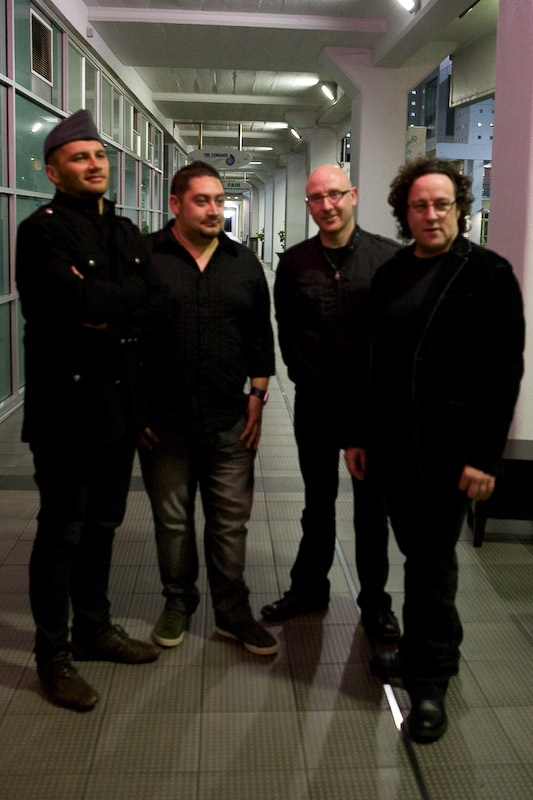
Opshop's "Maybe" won the title of Airplay Record of the Year in 2008.

The Radio Airplay Record of the Year is an Aotearoa Music Award presented annually to songs by local artists that receive high airplay. It was first presented in 2004 to Goldenhorse for "Maybe Tomorrow". No award was presented in 2005, but in 2006 it was reintroduced, with The Feelers claiming it for their single "Stand Up". Brooke Fraser's "Deciphering Me" followed in 2007, while Opshop won the award in 2008 with "Maybe". In 2009, "Always on My Mind", by Tiki Taane, was awarded the title. Stan Walker twice won the award two years in a row — in 2010 with "Black Box" and in 2011 with "Choose You", and again with "Take It Easy" in 2013 and "Bulletproof" in 2014.

== Winners ==
| Year | Artist | Song | Reference |
|---|---|---|---|
| 2004 | Goldenhorse | "Maybe Tomorrow" | |
| 2005 | —N/a | —N/a | |
| 2006 | The Feelers | "Stand Up" | |
| 2007 | Brooke Fraser | "Deciphering Me" | |
| 2008 | Opshop | "Maybe" | |
| 2009 | Tiki Taane | "Always on My Mind" | |
| 2010 | Stan Walker | "Black Box" | |
| 2011 | Stan Walker | "Choose You" | |
| 2012 | Six60 | "Don't Forget Your Roots" | |
| 2013 | Stan Walker | "Take It Easy" | |
| 2014 | Stan Walker | "Bulletproof" | |
| 2015 | Broods | "Mother & Father" | |
| 2016 | Six60 | "White Lines" | |

While nominees are not normally announced for this category, in 2004 and 2015 nominees were included.

- The non-winning nominees for 2004 were: Bic Runga - "Listening for the Weather" and Carly Binding - "We Kissed".
- The non-winning nominees for 2015 were: Benny Tipene - "Step On Up", Broods - "L.A.F.", Lorde - "Yellow Flicker Beat", Six60 - "Special".
