= 2016 New Zealand Music Awards =

Annual New Zealand music awards ceremony

- Awarded for: Excellence in New Zealand music
- Sponsored by: Vodafone
- Date: 17 November 2016
- Location: Vector Arena, Auckland
- Country: New Zealand
- Hosted by: Jono Pryor and Ben Boyce
- Reward: Tui award trophy
- Website: http://www.nzmusicawards.co.nz

Television/radio coverage
- Network: TV3

The 2016 New Zealand Music Awards was the 50th holding of the annual ceremony featuring awards for musical recording artists based in or originating from New Zealand. It took place in November 2016 at Vector Arena in Auckland and was hosted by comedy duo Jono Pryor and Ben Boyce. The awards show was broadcast live on TV3 and The Edge TV.

Nominations for the 2016 New Zealand Music Awards opened on 20 June 2016, and cover artists who have had commercial recordings released between 1 July 2015 and 31 July 2016. Nominations closed on 3 August 2016. The nominees were announced on 13 October, along with the 2016 Legacy Award recipient and the Critics' Choice Prize shortlist.

== Early awards ==
While most of the awards were presented at the main awards ceremony held in November, five genre awards are presented earlier in the year at ceremonies of their field.

- The first was awarded in February, with the Tui for Best Folk Album presented at the Auckland Folk Festival in Kumeu to Queenstown singer-songwriter Holly Arrowsmith for her debut album For the Weary Traveller.
- The Tui for Best Jazz Album was presented in March at the National Jazz Festival in Tauranga to Phil Broadhurst Quintet for their album Panacea.
- The Best Country Music Album Tui was presented in June at the New Zealand Country Music Awards in Gore to The Warratahs for their album Runaway Days.
- The Tui for Best Pacific Music Album was presented in June at the Vodafone Pacific Music Awards to the performance group Te Vaka for their album Amataga.
- The Tui for the Best Children's Music Album was presented in August on What Now to Itty Bitty Beats for their album Lay Your Head Down.

In addition, the artisan awards (previously known as the technical awards) were presented on 20 October at a cocktail event at the Pullman Hotel in Auckland. The Critics' Choice prize event and winner announcement will be held on 2 November at the Tuning Fork bar in Auckland.

== Nominees and winners ==
New for 2016, the technical awards have been renamed the artisan awards, and the Best Electronica Album award is now named Best Electronic Album. Broods dominated the awards, picking up Album of the Year, Single of the Year, Best Group, Best Pop Album and the People's Choice Award. R&B singer Aaradhna won Best Urban/Hip Hop Album, but refused to accept the award as she felt a category that included both R&B and rap acts was putting the two genres together for racial reasons. She then informally presented the award to rap group SWIDT. Recorded Music NZ still lists Aaradhna as the winner of the category. Winners are listed first and highlighted in boldface.

Key
‡ – Artisan award

Album of the Year	Single of the Year
Sponsored by Godfrey Hirst: **Broods – Conscious**; Aaradhna – Brown Girl; Fat Freddy's Drop – Bays; Hollie Smith – Water or Gold; Tami Neilson – Don’t Be Afraid; The Phoenix Foundation – Give Up Your Dreams	Sponsored by Vodafone: **Broods - Free**; Aaradhna - Brown Girl; Kings - Don't Worry Bout It; Maala - Kind of Love; Shapeshifter - Stars; The Naked and Famous - Higher
Best Group	Breakthrough Artist of the Year
**Broods – Conscious**; Fat Freddy's Drop – Bays; Sol3 Mio - On Another Note; The Phoenix Foundation – Give Up Your Dreams	**Kings - Don't Worry Bout It**; Leisure – All Over You; Nomad – Oh My My; Sachi – Lunch with Bianca
Best Male Solo Artist	Best Female Solo Artist
**Maala – Composure**; Avalanche City – We are for the Wild Places; Dave Dobbyn – Harmony House; Lawrence Arabia – Absolute Truth	**Aaradhna - Brown Girl**; Hollie Smith – Water or Gold; Ladyhawke – Wild Things; Tami Neilson – Don’t Be Afraid
Best Rock Album	Best Pop Album
**Villainy - Dead Sight**; Beastwars - The Death of All Things; Jordan Luck Band - Not Only... But Also	Sponsored by The Edge: **Broods – Conscious**; Avalanche City – We Are for the Wild Places; Maala - Composure
Best Urban/Hip Hop Album	Best Reggae/Roots Album
**Aaradhna – Brown Girl** (Note: While the 2016 award was formally awarded to Aaradhna for Brown Girl, she refused to accept it and informally presented it to fellow nominee SWIDT. "Aaradhna claims racism, gives away Tui at NZ Music Awards". The New Zealand Herald. NZME. 18 November 2016.); SWIDT – SmokeyGotBeatz Presents SWIDT vs EVERYBODY; PNC – The Luke Vailima EP	**Unity Pacific – Blackbirder Dread**; Fat Freddy's Drop – Bays; Rob Ruha – Pūmau
Best Alternative Album	Best Māori Album
**Lawrence Arabia – Absolute Truth**; The Phoenix Foundation – Give Up Your Dreams; Silicon – Personal Computer	**Rob Ruha – Pūmau**; Dennis Marsh – Maori Songbook 2; Kirsten Te Rito – Āiotanga
Best Worship Album	Best Classical Album
**Edge Kingsland - Edge Vol. 3: The Common Good**; Grace Vineyard Music - Seek You; LIFE Worship - By My Spirit	**Anthony Ritchie and Ross Harris – Fjärren: In the Distance**; Kenneth Young – Shadows and Light; Zephyr – Zephyr
Best Electronic Album	Legacy Award
**Pacific Heights – The Stillness**; Electric Wire Hustle – Aeons; Opiuo – Omniversal	Sponsored by The New Zealand Herald; No finalists are announced in this category. Announced 13 October 2016: **Bic Runga**
People's Choice Award	Critics' Choice Prize
Sponsored by Vodafone: **Broods**; Fat Freddy's Drop; Kings; Maala; Sol3 Mio	Sponsored by NZ on Air Presented 2 November 2016: **Scuba Diva**; Kane Strang; Spycc & INF
Highest selling New Zealand Single	Highest selling New Zealand Album
No finalists are announced in this category.: **Six60 - White Lines**	No finalists are announced in this category.: **Sol3 Mio - On Another Note**
Radio Airplay Record of the Year	International Achievement Award
Sponsored by NZ on Air No finalists are announced in this category.: **Six60 - White Lines**	No finalists are announced in this category.: **Fat Freddy's Drop**
Best Music Video	Best Album Cover‡
Sponsored by NZ on Air Presented 20 October 2016: **Chris Lane – Inside Out (Avalanche City)**; Sam Peacocke – Buried by the Burden ([Pacific Heights Ft. Louis Baker); Simon Oliver – Secret Lives of Furniture (Ha the Unclear)	Presented 20 October 2016: **Anns Taylor – Absolute Truth (Lawrence Arabia)**; Henrietta Harris – I'll Forget 17 (Lontalius); Simon Faisandier – Road To You (Arise)
Best Engineer‡	Best Producer‡
Presented 20 October 2016: **Joel Little – Conscious (Broods)**; Miller & Phil Yule – Shoot Me in the Heart (Miller Yule); Samuel Flynn Scott & Lee Prebble –Harmony House (Dave Dobbyn)	Sponsored by Massey University Presented 20 October 2016: **Joel Little – Conscious (Broods)**; Devin Abrams – The Stillness (Pacific Heights); Josh Fountain – Composure (Maala)
Best Folk Album	Best Jazz Album
Presented 7 February 2016: **Holly Arrowsmith - For The Weary Traveller**; Nadia Reid - Listen to Formations, Look for the Signs; Amiria Grenell - Autumn	Presented 26 March 2016: **Phil Broadhurst Quintet - Panacea**; Michael Houstoun and the Rodger Fox Big Band for Concerti; Kevin Field - The A List
Best Country Music Album	Best Pacific Music Album
Presented 2 June 2016: **The Warratahs - Runaway Days**; Eb & Sparrow - Sun/Son; Jody Direen - Breaks Out	Presented 9 June 2016: **Te Vaka - Amataga**; Annie Grace - The Journey; Sol3 Mio - On Another Note
Best Children's Music Album	
Presented 9 August 2016: **Itty Bitty Beats - Lay Your Head Down**; Anna van Riel - Cooking up a Song; Peter Weatherall - Lollipop Man	
