= 2014 APRA Silver Scroll Awards =

Annual New Zealand songwriting awards

- Awarded for: Excellence in New Zealand songwriting
- Date: October 30, 2014
- Location: TSB Bank Arena, Wellington
- Country: New Zealand
- Presented by: APRA New Zealand-Australasian Mechanical Copyright Owners Society
- Website: apraamcos.co.nz/awards/awards/silver-scroll-awards/

The 2014 APRA Silver Scroll Awards was held on Thursday 30 October 2014 at TSB Bank Arena in Wellington, celebrating excellence in New Zealand songwriting. It was the first time since 2004 that the awards were hosted in Wellington, with Auckland being the usual location.

== Silver Scroll award ==
The Silver Scroll award celebrates outstanding achievement in songwriting of original New Zealand pop music. The short list of finalists was announced on 18 September. The evening's music performances were produced by musician and nominee Lukasz Buda. Each of the nominated songs were covered in a new style by another artist. The Silver Scroll award was presented by 2013 winner Lorde.

Songwriter(s)	Act	Song	Covering artist
Georgia Nott, Joel Little and Caleb Nott	Broods	"Bridges"	Terror of the Deep, Rhian Sheehan, and string section
Hollie Fullbrook, Alexander Freer and Cass Mitchell	Tiny Ruins	"Me At The Museum, You In The Wintergardens"	Estere
Louis Baker	Louis Baker	"Back on My Feet"	The Golden Awesome
Samuel Scott, Lukasz Buda, Conrad Wedde, William Ricketts, Thomas Callwood and Christopher O'Connor	The Phoenix Foundation	"Bob Lennon John Dylan"	West Coast Bullies and gospel chop
Tami Neilson and Joshua Neilson	Tami Neilson	"Walk (Back To Your Arms)"	Jonny Marks, Gamelan Taniwha Jaya, arranged by Gareth Farr

=== Long list ===
In August 2014 a top 20 long list was announced. From this list APRA members voted to decide the five songs that make up the year's short list.

- Mahuia Bridgman-Cooper / Sean Sturm (School For Birds) "10,000 Things"
- Louis Baker "Back on my Feet"
- Samuel Scott / Luke Buda / Thomas Wedde / William Ricketts / Thomas Callwood / Christopher O'Conner (The Phoenix Foundation) "Bob Lennon John Dylan"
- Joel Little / Georgia Nott / Caleb Nott (Broods) "Bridges"
- Joseph Faris (Ezra Vine) "Celeste"
- Jolyon Mulholland (Mulholland) "Cry If You Want To"
- Jonathan Bree "Duckies Lament"
- Daniel McBride (Sheep, Dog & Wolf) "Glare"
- Brendan McKenna (Lake South) "Good Keen Man"
- Tom Scott / Lui Tuisau / Brandon Haru / Christopher James / Hayden Dick (@Peace) "Gravity"
- Edward Castelow (Dictaphone Blues) "Her Heart Breaks Like a Wave"
- Connan Hosford (Connan Mockasin) "I'm the Man That Will Find You"
- Jeremy Toy (She's So Rad) "Levels"
- Anna Coddington "Make You Mine"
- Hollie Fullbrook / Alexander Freer / Cass Mitchell (Tiny Ruins) "Me At the Museum, You In the Wintergardens"
- David Dallas / Aaron Iusitini / Jordan Iusitini / King Britt / Tim Motzer / Gertrude Morgan (David Dallas) "Runnin'"
- Mark Vanilau "Simplicity"
- Sidney Diamond / Isaiah Libeau (Sidney Diamond) "Speakers Blown"
- Tama Waipara / Mateheke Waititi (Tama Waipara) "Sunshine on the Water"
- Tami Neilson / Joshua Neilson (Tami Neilson) "Walk (Back To Your Arms)"

== New Zealand Music Hall of Fame ==
Composer Douglas Lilburn was posthumously inducted into the New Zealand Music Hall of Fame.

== Other awards ==
Six other awards were presented at the Silver Scroll Awards: APRA Maioha Award (for excellence in contemporary Maori music), SOUNZ Contemporary Award (for creativity and inspiration in composition) and two awards acknowledging songs with the most radio and television play in New Zealand and overseas. In 2014, two new awards were introduced - APRA Best Original Music in a Feature Film Award and APRA Best Original Music in a Series Award.

Award	Winners/Nominees
APRA Maioha Award	Rob Ruha "Tiki Tapu" (Rob Ruha); Maraea Davies "Kati Ra" (RJ Kerswell); Kororia Taumaunu, Amomai Pihama and Matt Sadgrove "Kei Muri Pea" (Manea)
SOUNZ Contemporary Award	Michael Norris "Inner Phases" for Chinese instrument ensemble and string quartet; Leonie Holmes "Aquae Sulis" for orchestra of winds, strings, harp and percussion; Celeste Oram "Macropsia" for orchestra
APRA Best Original Music in a Feature Film Award	Victoria Kelly "Field Punishment No. 1"; David Long "Beyond the Edge"; Michael O’Neill and Peter Van Der Fluit "Romeo & Juliet: A Love Song"
APRA Best Original Music in a Series Award	Tom Mcleod Girl Vs. Boy (Season 2); Karl Steven Harry; Andrew McDowall Wiki the Kiwi (Season 1)
Most Performed Work in New Zealand	Ella Yelich-O'Connor and Joel Little - "Team" (Lorde)
Most Performed Work in Overseas	Ella Yelich-O'Connor and Joel Little - "Royals" (Lorde)

== APRA song awards ==
Outside of the Silver Scroll Awards, APRA presented four genre awards in 2014. The APRA Best Pacific Song was presented at the Pacific Music Awards, the APRA Best Country Music Song was presented at the New Zealand Country Music Awards and the APRA Children’s Song of the Year and What Now Video of the Year were presented live on What Now.

Award	Songwriter(s)	Act	Song
APRA Best Pacific Song	Mark Vanilau	Mark Vanilau	"Giant of the Sea"
APRA Best Country Music Song	Tami Neilson / Delaney Davidson	Tami Neilson & Delaney Davidson	"Whiskey & Kisses"
APRA Children's Song of the Year	Anika Moa	Anika Moa	"Colours Are Beautiful"
What Now Children’s Video of the Year	Aimee Herd	Kath Bee	"Dragons Under My Bed"
