= Old Dog (disambiguation) =

"Old Dog" (song) may refer to:

- "Old Dog", a song by Broods from the album Don't Feed the Pop Monster
- "Old Dog", a song by J. Cole from his album The Fall-Off
