= L.A.F (song) =

Single by Broods

from the album Evergreen
- Released: 10 November 2014
- Genre: Electropop
- Length: 2:47
- Label: Dryden Street; Universal
- Songwriters: Caleb Nott; Georgia Nott; Joel Little
- Producer: Joel Little

Broods singles chronology
"Mother & Father" (2014)	"L.A.F" (2014)	"Four Walls" (2015)

"L.A.F" (an acronym for "Loose as fuck") is a song recorded by New Zealand musical duo Broods for their debut studio album, Evergreen (2014). It was co-written by group members Caleb and Georgia Nott with the record's producer, Joel Little. "L.A.F" was first released to digital retailers on 3 July 2014 as the first promotional single supporting the album and serves as the second official single as of 10 November 2014.

"L.A.F" received generally positive reviews from critics, who praised the song's energy and labelled it an album highlight. It was the duo's first single to not reach the official New Zealand Singles Chart, but did reach the top ten on the local artists' chart. The song was featured on the soundtrack of the EA Sports video game, FIFA 15.

== Content ==
"L.A.F" is an indie electropop song with lyrics describing letting loose with friends, or alternately "getting wasted," according to Caleb. Its rhythmic style has been described as one of their most experimental by Georgia and was labelled a "club banger" by FADER magazine.

== Critical reception ==
Timothy Monger of AllMusic cited "L.A.F" as one of the album's standout tracks and wrote that the song's energy demonstrated the siblings' "command of enchanting and melodic indie electropop." Tom of Sputnikmusic also deemed the song a highlight, praising the "soaring sugar high chorus" and "endearing[ly] ... skittish rhythm." Lydia Jenkin of The New Zealand Herald similarly considered "L.A.F" one of the most memorable songs on Evergreen due to its unique rhythm that she wrote "will have you grinning and flailing your limbs around in response to its colourful energy."

== Music video ==
The official music video for "L.A.F" premiered 9 November 2014. Directed by Jordan Arts, the clip features a minimalist visual style with seemingly-random, colorful imagery including lightsabers and oranges superimposed over a woman's eyes.

== Chart performance ==
Chart (2014–15)	Peak position
New Zealand Artists (Recorded Music NZ)	7
