= Broods =

New Zealand musical duo

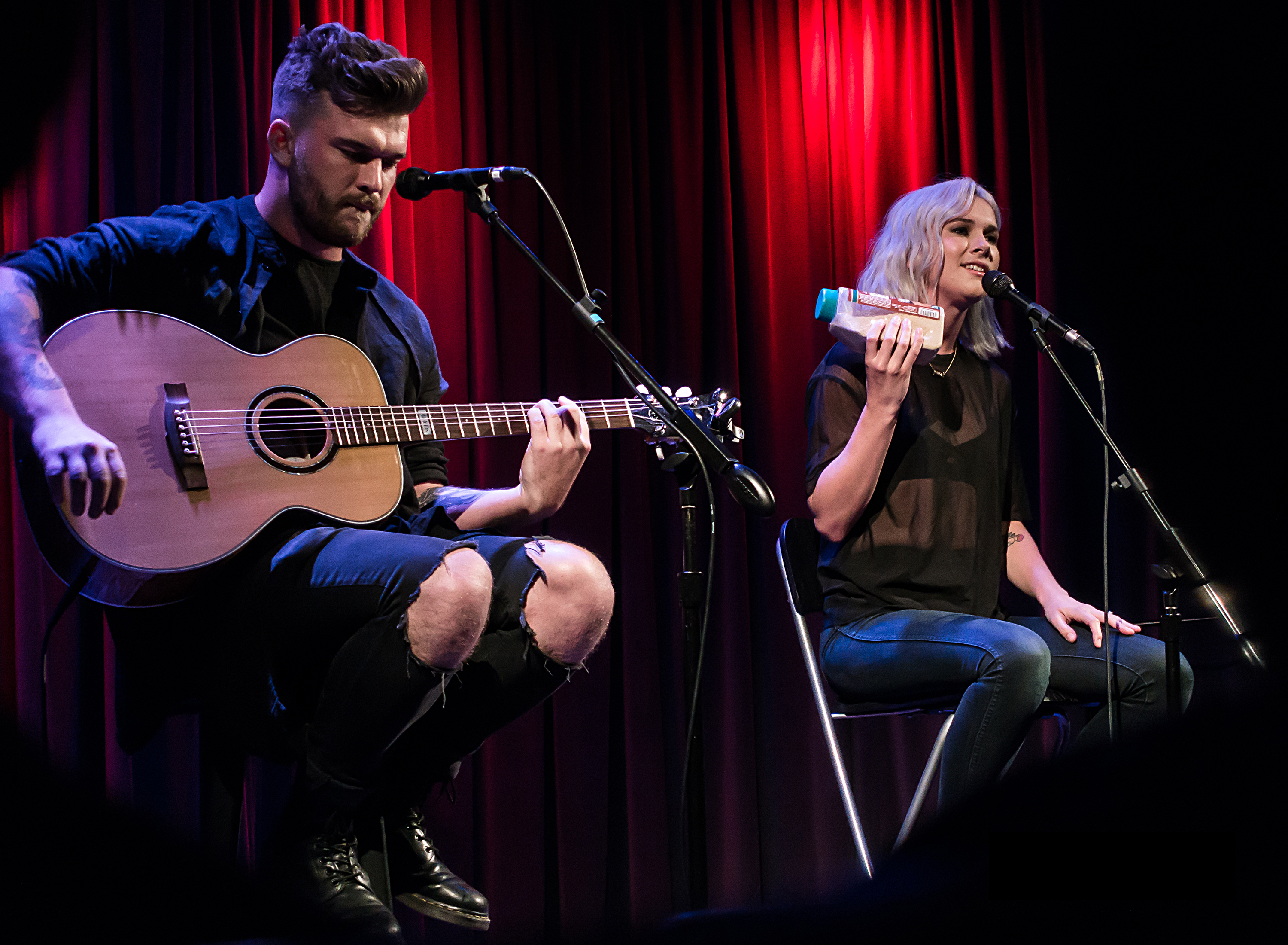
- Broods performing at the Grammy Museum, 2016

Background information
- Origin: Nelson, New Zealand
- Genres: Indie pop; electronica; electropop; trip hop
- Years active: 2013–present
- Labels: Neon Gold; Polydor
- Members: Georgia Nott; Caleb Nott
- Website: broodsmusic.com

Broods are a musical duo from Nelson, New Zealand, composed of Georgia Josiena Nott on lead vocals, with older brother and multi-instrumentalist Caleb Allan Joseph Nott on production and backing vocals.

They released the single "Bridges", which went to No. 8 on the New Zealand singles chart, and signed with Capitol and Polydor Records. They released their self-titled debut EP, Broods, in January 2014, which was followed by a full-length album, Evergreen, in August 2014. In June 2016, Broods released their second album, Conscious. They released their third album, Don't Feed the Pop Monster, in February 2019. A few years later they would release Space Island in February 2022 under a distribution deal with Island Records Australia.

The band has toured with Ellie Goulding, Haim, Sam Smith, Tove Lo and Taylor Swift. They have won ten New Zealand Music Awards.

== History ==
=== 2010–2013: Formation and early years ===
Born in Nelson, New Zealand, Caleb and Georgia Nott have performed together since childhood. They grew up in a musical family with three other siblings, and would go along with their parents to weddings and church performances. They won a talent competition, "Richmond's Got Talent", as teenagers at Richmond Mall in 2010. While attending Garin College, they were members of the indie rock band, The Peasants, who won the Smokefreerockquest music competition in 2011. The band split in late 2012, shortly after winning a grant from NZ On Air. Georgia began studying popular music at the University of Auckland. Caleb studied industrial design. They both dropped out of university to pursue Broods.

Broods was formed in Auckland in early 2013. The brother-sister project began collaborating with music producer Joel Little, whom they met as a judge at the 2011 Smokefreerockquest. He produced Lorde's 2013 hit single, "Royals". While considering names for the band, their manager suggested Broods. The band liked the double meaning, relating to family and a feeling of brooding in their music. They released their debut single, "Bridges", online in October 2013. The song was picked up by Idolator and other music blogs, earning over 200,000 streams in a week. MTV described the track as "a bittersweet synth-pop echo chamber". Broods signed with Capitol Records worldwide and Polydor in the UK and Europe in December 2013.

=== 2014–2015: Broods and Evergreen ===
The single, "Bridges", debuted at No. 8 in the New Zealand single chart in January 2014 and was chosen as the U.S. iTunes Store single of the week in February 2014. The song, "Never Gonna Change", was made available for streaming in anticipation of their début EP, Broods, which was released on 30 January 2014. The band made their debut U.S. performance at Bardot in Hollywood, California on 24 February 2014, touring as a three piece with James Mataio on drums. They debuted in the UK at London's Notting Hill Arts Club on 5 March 2014, and toured briefly with Haim. They toured North America, and then Australia in support of Ellie Goulding. They returned to the U.S. to make their television début on Late Night with Seth Meyers in July, and toured opening for Sam Smith.

Broods released their début album, Evergreen, on 22 August 2014, which debuted at No. 1 on the New Zealand album chart. They won as Breakthrough Artist of the Year at the 2014 New Zealand Music Awards, and were also nominated for Single of the Year and the People's Choice Award. They were also nominated for the APRA Silver Scroll Award for the single "Bridges". In 2015, they returned to North America for a headlining tour, joined by drummer Joel Farland. The band performed their single "Four Walls" on Conan, and played the Groovin the Moo, Firefly, WayHome, Lollapalooza, and Outside Lands music festivals. They collaborated with Australian singer/songwriter Troye Sivan, co-writing and producing the song "Ease" from his 2015 EP Wild and subsequent album Blue Neighbourhood. At the 2015 New Zealand Music Awards, they won Album of the Year for Evergreen, Best Group, Best Pop Album, and Radio Airplay Record of the Year for "Mother & Father".

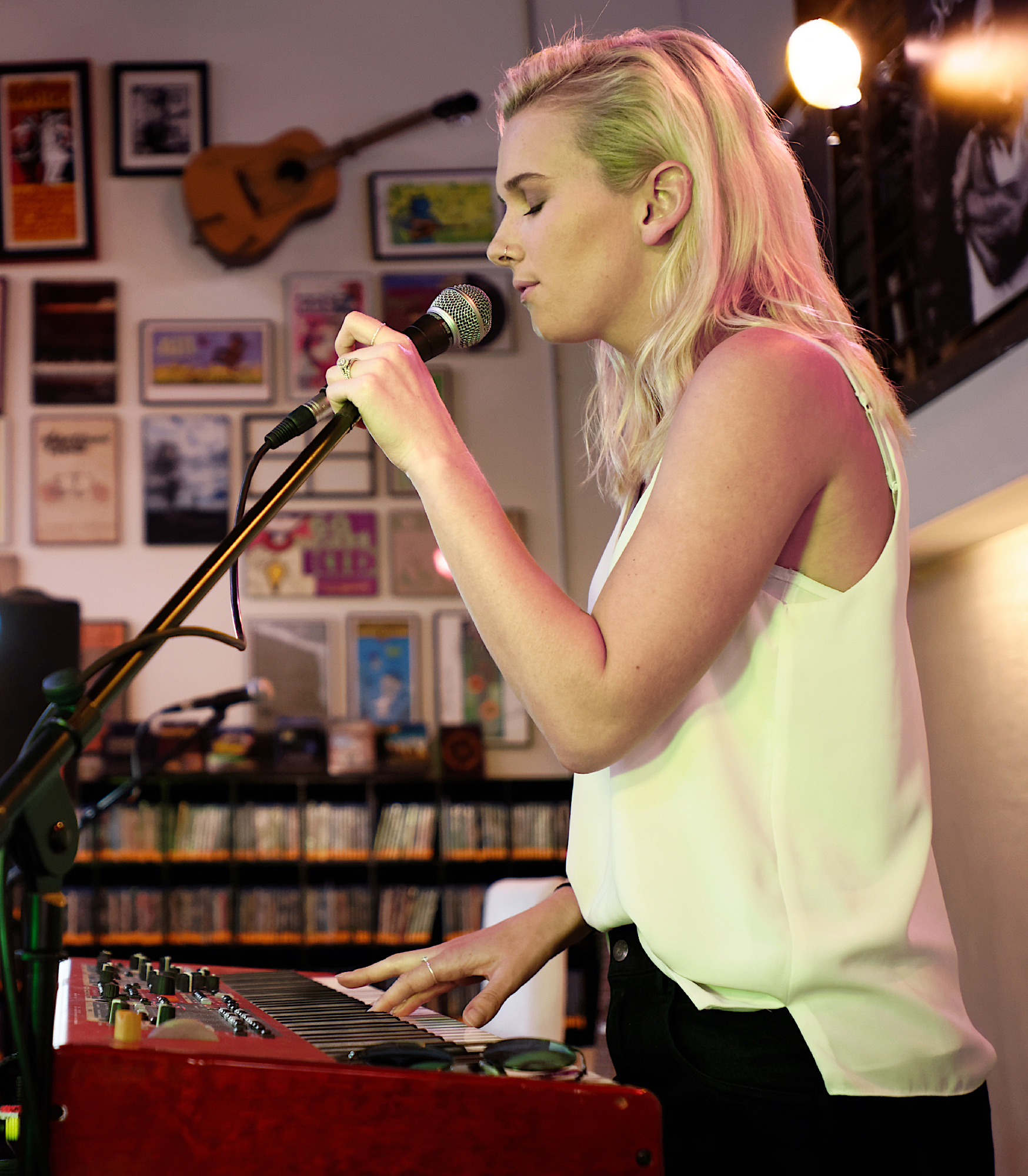
Georgia Nott at Fingerprints Music in Long Beach, California on 30 June 2016.

=== 2016–2018: Conscious and solo projects ===
Broods began writing material for a follow-up album immediately after releasing their debut. They experimented with adding live instrumentation – guitar, organ and electric piano – to their synthesizer-based electronic sound. The duo released the first single, "Free", on 1 April 2016, working again with producer Joel Little, which has a heavier industrial style. Their second album, Conscious, was released on 24 June 2016, and includes collaborations with Lorde and Tove Lo.

Georgia married long-term partner Jacob Wieblitz in 2016. The couple honeymooned in Bali. Caleb and Georgia moved to Los Angeles in April 2016, and opened again for Ellie Goulding on the North American leg of her Delirium World Tour. Broods appeared on The Late Late Show with James Corden in May, and featured on the Jarryd James single, "1000×", released on 17 June 2016. New Zealand actress Rose McIver appeared in the video for their song "Heartlines". Broods toured Australia, New Zealand, and North America through mid-2016, and were joined by Jarryd James in August. Their cousin, Jonathan Nott, played drums on the tour. BROODS won five New Zealand Music Awards in November, and supported Two Door Cinema Club on tour. They toured Europe with Tove Lo in March 2017. In January 2018, Georgia released a solo album titled The Venus Project. That same month, Caleb released the single "Make Me Feel" under the name Fizzy Milk. In October and November, Broods as opening act joined American singer-songwriter Taylor Swift’s Reputation Stadium Tour during the Oceania leg.

=== 2018–present: Don't Feed the Pop Monster, Space Island, and solo work ===
On 8 August 2018, Broods released "Peach" – the first single from their third studio album Don't Feed the Pop Monster. The music video was released on 5 September and offered the first glimpse into the new image that Broods would be presenting. This new image was created by Georgia and Caleb after they were dropped by their label, Capitol Records, following Broods' second album, Conscious. Previously, the creative direction of Broods had been mainly controlled by their label, however, this time around the siblings had full control over how they wanted to present themselves. The band released their third album, Don't Feed the Pop Monster, on 1 February 2019. In early 2021 they released Guilty Love with Ladyhawke, which went on to feature in Ladyhawke's Time Flies album.

A social media post by the band on 1 September 2021 mentioned their fourth album, Space Island. They went on to release a trio of singles before the album; "Piece of My Mind", "Heartbreak" and "Like a Woman", all of which follow a story.

In 2023, singer Georgia Nott began working on material for a new solo project entitled Georgia Gets By. The first single, "Easier to Run", was released on June 22. The second single, "Happiness Is an 8 Ball", was released on August 1.

== Members ==
- Caleb Allan Joseph Nott – born 1 July 1992 (age 34)
- Georgia Josiena Nott – born 7 July 1994 (age 32)

== Discography ==
=== Studio albums ===
Title	Album details	Peak chart positions					Certifications
Title	Album details	NZ	AUS	CAN	US	US Rock	Certifications
Evergreen	Released: 22 August 2014; Label: Capitol; Format: CD, download	1	5	—	45	12	RMNZ: Gold
Conscious	Released: 24 June 2016; Label: Capitol; Format: CD, cassette, download, LP	1	2	69	52	7	
Don't Feed the Pop Monster	Released: 1 February 2019; Label: Neon Gold, Atlantic; Format: CD, cassette, download, LP	3	17	—	—	—	
Space Island	Released: 18 February 2022; Label: Island; Format: CD, download, LP	13	—	—	—	—	
"—" denotes an album that did not chart in that country.

=== Extended plays ===
Title	Album details	Peak chart positions			
Title	Album details	NZ	AUS	US	US Rock
Broods	Released: 30 January 2014; Label: Island Records Australia; Format: CD, download, LP	2	30	164	45

=== Singles ===
Title	Year	Peak chart positions						Certifications	Album
Title	Year	NZ	AUS	BEL (Fl)	US Adult	US Alt Airplay	US Rock	Certifications	Album
"Bridges"	2014	8	51	—	—	25	45	ARIA: Platinum; RMNZ: Platinum	Broods
"Never Gonna Change"	2014	40	— (Note: "Never Gonna Change" did not enter the Australian ARIA Singles Chart but peaked at number 17 on the ARIA Hitseekers Chart.)	83	—	—	—		Broods
"Mother & Father"	2014	12	54	—	—	36	—	ARIA: Gold; RMNZ: Platinum	Evergreen
"L.A.F"	2014	— (Note: "L.A.F" did not enter the Official New Zealand Music Chart, but did peak at number 7 on the New Zealand Artists singles chart.)	—	—	—	—	—		Evergreen
"Four Walls"	2015	18	—	—	—	—	—	RMNZ: Gold	Evergreen
"Free"	2016	21	30	—	—	26	47	ARIA: Platinum; RMNZ: Gold	Conscious
"Heartlines"	2017	— (Note: "Heartlines" did not enter the Official New Zealand Music Chart, but did peak at number 3 on the New Zealand Heatseeker Singles chart.)	—	—	37	—	—	ARIA: Platinum	Conscious
"Peach"	2018	— (Note: "Peach" did not enter the NZ Top 40 Singles Chart, but peaked at number 1 on the NZ Hot Singles Chart, and number 6 on the New Zealand Artists singles chart.)	—	—	—	—	—	ARIA: Platinumm	Don't Feed the Pop Monster
"Eyes a Mess" (cover medley of Hearts a Mess / Eyes Wide Open)	2018	—	—	—	—	—	—		Non-album single
"Everything Goes (Wow)"	2018	— (Note: "Everything Goes (Wow)" did not enter the NZ Top 40 Singles Chart, but peaked at number 20 on the NZ Singles Chart, and number 18 on the Hot Singles Chart.)	—	—	—	—	—		Don't Feed the Pop Monster
"Hospitalized"	2019	— (Note: "Hospitalized" did not enter the NZ Top 40 Singles Chart, but peaked at number 16 on the NZ Hot Singles Chart.)	—	—	—	—	—		Don't Feed the Pop Monster
"Too Proud"	2019	— (Note: "Too Proud" did not enter the NZ Top 40 Singles Chart, but peaked at number six on the NZ Hot Singles Chart.)	—	—	—	—	—		Don't Feed the Pop Monster
"Guilty Love" (with Ladyhawke)	2021	—	—	—	—	—	—		Time Flies
"Piece of My Mind"	2021	— (Note: "Piece of My Love" did not enter the NZ Top 40 Singles Chart, but peaked at number 20 on the NZ Hot Singles Chart.)	—	—	—	—	—		Space Island
"Locked On You" (with Kito)	2021	—	—	—	—	—	—		Blossom
"Heartbreak"	2021	— (Note: "Heartbreak" did not enter the NZ Top 40 Singles Chart, but peaked at number 17 on the NZ Hot Singles Chart.)	—	—	—	—	—		Space Island
"Like a Woman"	2022	— (Note: "Like a Woman" did not enter the NZ Top 40 Singles Chart, but peaked at number 14 on the Hot NZ Singles Chart.)	—	—	—	—	—		Space Island
"I Keep" (featuring Tove Lo)	2022	— (Note: "I Keep" did not enter the NZ Top 40 Singles Chart, but peaked at number 14 on the NZ Hot Singles Chart.)	—	—	—	—	—		Space Island
"Fuck My Money"	2023	— (Note: "Fuck My Money" did not enter the NZ Top 40 Singles Chart, but peaked at number 11 on the Hot 20 NZ Singles Chart.)	—	—	—	—	—		TBA
"Hand As My Arrow" (with Zella Day)	2023	—	—	—	—	—	—		TBA
"—" denotes a recording that did not chart or was not released in that territory.

=== Featured singles ===
Title	Year	Peak chart positions			Album
Title	Year	NZ	AUS	US Electro	Album
"Team, Ball, Player, Thing" (among #KiwisCureBatten)	2015	2	—	—	Non-album single
"1000×" (Jarryd James featuring Broods)	2016	— (Note: "1000×" did not enter the NZ Top 40 Singles Chart, but peaked at number 3 on the NZ Heatseekers Singles Chart.)	47	—	High
"Stranded" (Flight Facilities featuring Broods, Reggie Watts & Saro)	2017	—	—	—	Non-album singles
"Be Like You" (Whethan featuring Broods)	2018	—	—	39	Non-album singles
"Creature Kind" (Kito & Broods)	2018	—	—	—	Haani
"Honest" (San Holo featuring Broods)	2020	— (Note: "Honest" did not enter the NZ Top 40 Singles Chart, but peaked at number 34 on the NZ Hot Singles Chart.)	—	25	Non-album single
"Forever" (Flight Facilities featuring Broods)	2021	— (Note: "Forever" did not enter the NZ Top 40 Singles Chart, but peaked at number 25 on the NZ Hot Singles Chart.)	—	—	Forever
"—" denotes a recording that did not chart or was not released in that territory.

=== Promotional singles ===
Title	Year	Peak chart positions		Album
Title	Year	NZ	AUS	Album
"Everytime"	2014	—	—	Evergreen
"Couldn't Believe"	2016	— (Note: "Couldn't Believe" did not enter the Official New Zealand Music Chart, but did peak at number 4 on the New Zealand Heatseekers Singles chart.)	81	Conscious
"—" denotes a recording that did not chart or was not released in that territory.

=== Other charted songs ===
Title	Year	Peak chart positions	Album
Title	Year	NZ	Album
"Freak of Nature" (featuring Tove Lo)	2016	— (Note: "Freak of Nature" did not enter the Official New Zealand Music Chart, but did peak at number 5 on the New Zealand Heatseeker Singles chart.)	Conscious
"Sucker"	2019	— (Note: "Sucker" did not enter the NZ Top 40 Singles Chart, but peaked at number 34 on the NZ Hot Singles Chart.)	Don't Feed the Pop Monster

=== Other appearances ===
Year	Title	Artist	Album	Notes
2015	"Love Me Badder (BROODS Remix)"	Elliphant	Love Me Badder (Remixes)	Remix
2015	"Ease"	Troye Sivan	Blue Neighbourhood	Featured artist
2016	"Good Life"	Zhu	Generationwhy	Un-credited vocalist
2019	"Emotional Machine"	Marina	Love + Fear	Un-credited vocalist
2021	"What I Want"	Flight Facilities	Forever	Featured artist
2023	"Better Days"	Oh Land	Loop Soup	Featured artist

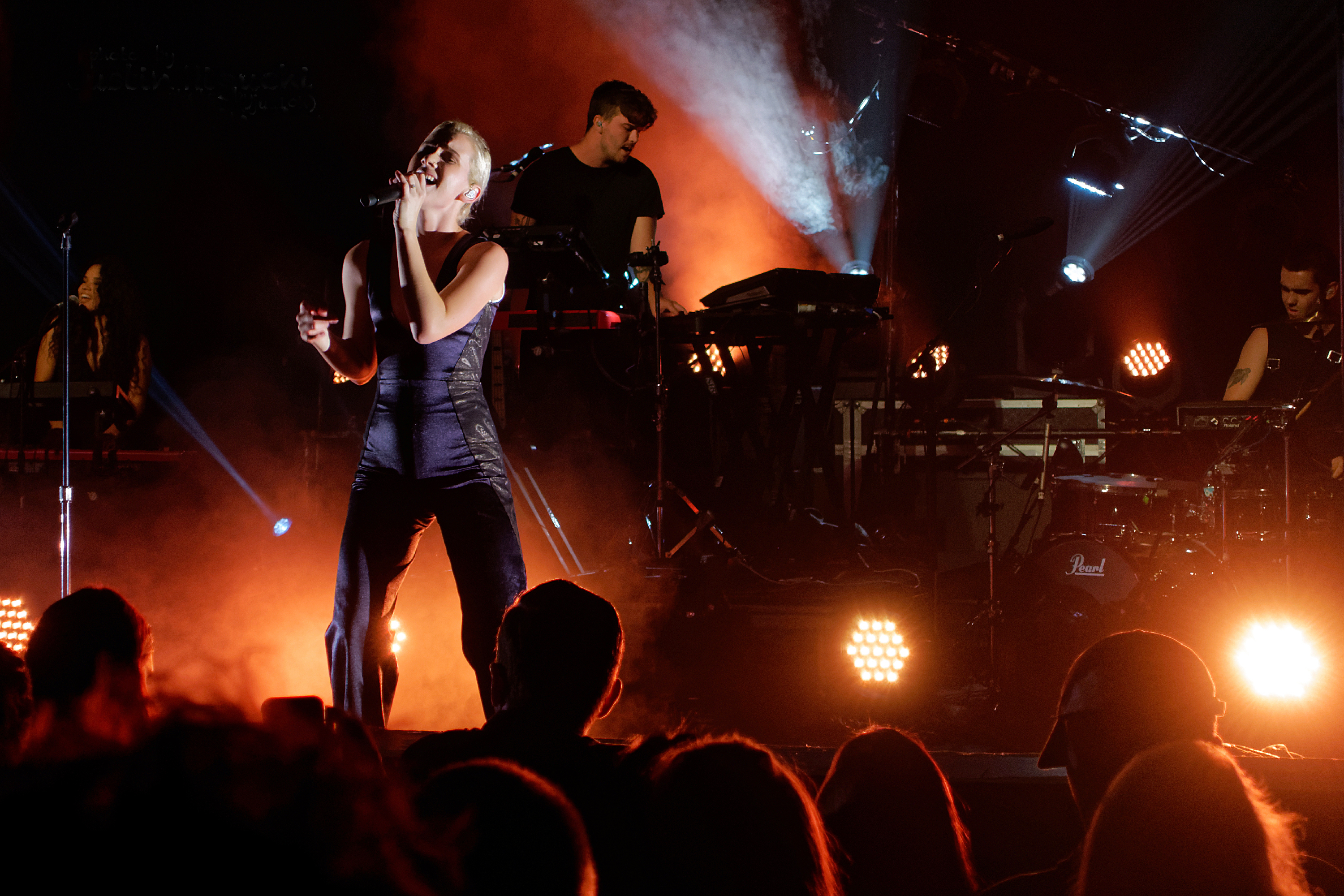
Broods performing live in 2016.

=== Solo projects ===
Year	Title	Artist	Album
2018	The Venus Project: Volume One	The Venus Project (Georgia Nott)	—N/a
2018	"Make Me Feel"	Fizzy Milk (Caleb Nott) feat. Jarryd James	Non-album single

=== Music videos ===
Title	Year	Director(s)	Ref
"Never Gonna Change"	2014	Remi Weekes	
"Bridges"	2014	Aleksander Hørup, Jeppe Kolstrup	
"Bridges" (U.S. version)	2014	Dori Oskowitz	
"Mother & Father"	2014	Jordan Arts	
"L.A.F"	2014	Jordan Arts	
"Free"	2016	Jessie Hill	
"Heartlines"	2016	Dano Cerny	
"Peach"	2018	Sam Kristofski	
"Everything Goes (Wow)"	2018	Sam Kristofski	
"Too Proud"	2019	Malia James	

== Awards and nominations ==
Year	Award	Nomination	Result
2014	APRA Awards (New Zealand)	Silver Scroll Award – "Bridges"	Nominated
2014	New Zealand Music Awards	Breakthrough Artist of the Year	Won
2014	New Zealand Music Awards	Single of the Year – "Bridges"	Nominated
2014	New Zealand Music Awards	People's Choice Award	Nominated
2015	International Dance Music Awards	Best Breakthrough Artist	Nominated
2015	New Zealand Music Awards	Album of the Year – Evergreen	Won
2015	New Zealand Music Awards	Best Group	Won
2015	New Zealand Music Awards	Best Pop Album	Won
2015	New Zealand Music Awards	Radio Airplay Record of the Year – "Mother & Father"	Won
2016	MTV Europe Music Awards	Best New Zealand Act	Won
2016	New Zealand Music Awards	Album of the Year – Conscious	Won
2016	New Zealand Music Awards	Best Group	Won
2016	New Zealand Music Awards	Best Pop Album – Conscious	Won
2016	New Zealand Music Awards	People's Choice Award	Won
2016	New Zealand Music Awards	Single of the Year – "Free"	Won
2019	APRA Awards (New Zealand)	Silver Scroll Award – "Dust"	Nominated
