= Nomad (New Zealand band) =

- Origin: Christchurch, New Zealand
- Genres: Pop
- Years active: 2015–2020
- Members: Aasha Mallard; Will McGillivray; Cullen Kiesanowski
- Website: www.facebook.com/officialnomadmusic

Nomad (stylised nomad or NOMAD) are a New Zealand band, best known for their 2016 single "Oh My My", which peaked at #2 on the Top 20 NZ Singles Chart. After the song had 1.7 million streaming plays, they were nominated for Breakthrough Artist of the Year at the 2016 NZ Music Awards.

== Discography ==
=== Studio album ===
Title	Album details	Peak chart positions
Title	Album details	NZ Artist
Can You Feel it?	Released: 6 April 2018; Label: Nomad; Format: Digital download, streaming	10
"—" denotes a recording that did not chart.

=== Singles ===
Title	Year	Peak chart positions	Certifications	Album
Title	Year	NZ Artist	Certifications	Album
"I Will Find You" (featuring Dave Dobbyn)	2014	8		Non-album singles
"Love Will Call"	2015	14		Non-album singles
"Oh My My"	2016	2	RMNZ: Gold	Non-album singles
"I Won't Stop"	2017	10		Non-album singles
"All of My Heart"	2018	—		Can You Feel It?
"She's Getting Away"	2019	—		Non-album single
"—" denotes a recording that did not chart.
