= Four Walls (Broods song) =

Single by Broods

from the album Evergreen
- Released: 24 January 2015
- Recorded: 2014
- Length: 3:28
- Label: Capitol; Dryden Street; Universal
- Songwriters: Caleb Nott; Georgia Nott; Joel Little
- Producer: Joel Little

Broods singles chronology
"L.A.F." (2014)	"Four Walls" (2015)	"Free" (2016)

"Four Walls" is a song recorded by New Zealand indie pop duo Broods for their debut studio album, Evergreen (2014). It was written by duo members Caleb and Georgia Nott alongside the song's producer Joel Little. The song was initially released to digital retailers on 18 August 2014 (in Oceania) and 25 August (in North America) as the second countdown single issued in promotion of the album, following the release of "L.A.F." on 3 July. "Four Walls" entered the Official New Zealand Music Chart at No. 18 for the chart dated 25 August 2014. It was later re-released on 24 January 2015 as the third official single off Evergreen.

== Content ==
"Four Walls" is a melancholic ballad featuring prominent piano and drum or handclap instrumentation. Its lyrics depict the narrator finding her "perfect man" and relate the comfort of true love to the feeling of being at home. Tom at Sputnikmusic also found the song to evoke the nervousness of a first love. The last repetition of the chorus notably changes the lyric "Those four walls now are home" to "Those three words now are home", alluding to a shorthand for "I love you".

== Critical reception ==
Lydia Jenkin of The New Zealand Herald labelled the song one of the album's highlights, writing that "It... holds its own with expertly layered vocal harmonies, and perfectly timed bass drops." Direct Lyrics contributor Kevipod was complimentary of the "peaceful ballad" styling of the song. "Georgia Nott does all the singing," he writes, "and she does a beautiful job. ... If you’re currently in love, and living under the same roof with your partner, then you'll want to listen to this song."

== Chart performance ==
Chart (2014)	Peak position
New Zealand (Recorded Music NZ)	18

== Certifications ==
Region	Certification	Certified units/sales
New Zealand (RMNZ)	Gold	7,500^{*}
^{*} Sales figures based on certification alone.
