= Aotearoa Music Award for International Achievement =

Annual New Zealand music award

The Aotearoa Music Award for International Achievement is an Aotearoa Music Award that honours New Zealand music artists for their success in the music markets of other countries. Record sales are the main factor in determining the award, but record chart positions, sales of concert tickets and notable promotional performances are also taken into account. It was first awarded in 1984. It was not awarded in 2006. In 2005, 2008 and 2009, multiple artists received the honour.

== Recipients ==
=== 1984 to 2002 ===
Year	Winner	Other finalists	Ref.
1984	Tim Finn	Dragon; Split Enz	
1985	Kiri Te Kanawa	DD Smash; Dalvanius Prime and the Pātea Māori Club	
1986	Herbs	The Chills; Michael Roycroft	
1987	Neil Finn	Dave Dobbyn; The Chills; Shona Laing; Kiri Te Kanawa	
1988	Neil Finn	The Chills; Shona Laing	
1989	The Front Lawn	Kiri Te Kanawa; Straitjacket Fits	
1990	Fan Club	The Chills; Margaret Urlich	
1991	No awards held		
1992	Crowded House	Jenny Morris; Straitjacket Fits	
1993	Jenny Morris	Malvina Major; Shona Laing	
1994	Crowded House	Straitjacket Fits; Headless Chickens	
1995	Headless Chickens	Shihad; Crowded House	
1996	Shihad	Finn Brothers; Dave Dobbyn; Supergroove	
1997	OMC	Crowded House; Jane Campion; Peter Jackson	
1998	OMC	The Mutton Birds; Garageland	
1999	Bic Runga	Neil Finn; The Feelers	
2000	Bic Runga	Te Vaka; Shihad	
2001	Shihad	Deep Obsession; Salmonella Dub	
2002	Salmonella Dub	Nathan Haines; Anika Moa	

=== 2003 to present ===
From 2003, no finalists have been announced for the award.

Year	Winner	Ref.
2003	The Datsuns	
2004	Hayley Westenra	
2005	Scribe	
2005	Evermore	
2005	Finn Brothers	
2006	Not awarded	
2007	Evermore	
2008	Flight of the Conchords	
2008	Savage	
2009	Ladyhawke	
2009	Brooke Fraser	
2010	Stan Walker	
2011	Brooke Fraser	
2012	Kimbra	
2013	Lorde	
2014	Lorde	
2015	Lorde	
2015	Savage	
2016	Fat Freddy's Drop	
