= Conscious (Broods album) =

Studio album by Broods
- Released: 24 June 2016
- Genre: Electropop; synth-pop; dance
- Length: 48:14
- Label: Dryden Street; Island; Capitol; UMA
- Producer: Joel Little; Alex Hope; Captain Cuts; Broods

Broods chronology
Evergreen (2014)	Conscious (2016)	Don't Feed the Pop Monster (2019)

Singles from Conscious
- 1. "Free" Released: 1 April 2016; 2. "Heartlines" Released: 16 January 2017

Conscious is the second studio album recorded by New Zealand music duo Broods, released on 24 June 2016. It builds on the electropop sound established in their 2014 debut, Evergreen, with elements of industrial and R&B. The album includes collaborations with Tove Lo and Lorde, and was preceded in April 2016 by the RMNZ Gold-certified single, "Free".

Upon release, Conscious was met with generally positive reviews and debuted at Nos. 1 and 2, respectively, on the New Zealand and Australian album charts. In the US, the album charted lower than Evergreen on the Billboard 200 at 52 but reached career highs on the Rock and Alternative charts.

== Background and development ==
In August 2014, Broods released their debut album, which was produced entirely by Joel Little. It was preceded by the single "Mother & Father". The album received positive reviews and was successful in their home country of New Zealand, charting at number 1. After the album was released the duo embarked on a tour, which also visited the United States. In April 2016, the duo opened for British singer-songwriter Ellie Goulding for select US dates on her Delirium World Tour.

On April 18, the duo announced the Conscious tour and released the album artwork and track listing.

== Singles ==
"Free" was released 1 April 2016 as the album's lead single. It debuted at No. 30 on the New Zealand Singles Chart and has since reached a peak position of 21; it has also been certified Gold by Recorded Music NZ. The single is their highest-charting entry to date on the Australian Singles Chart at its peak of 30. "Free" impacted American modern rock (or alternative) radio on 12 April 2016 and serves as the duo's third official single in that territory.

"Heartlines", co-written by Lorde, was also released as a promotional track on 10 June 2016. It reached No. 3 on the New Zealand Heatseekers chart. Its music video was released on 29 July 2016. The song was serviced to American hot adult contemporary radio on 16 January 2017 as the album's second official single.

=== Other songs ===
The duo released "Couldn't Believe" to digital retailers on 20 May 2016 as the first promotional single to support pre-orders. It peaked at number 4 on the New Zealand Heatseeker Singles chart and also charted at No. 81 in Australia.

== Commercial performance ==
Conscious debuted at number one on the New Zealand Top 40 Albums Chart and stayed there for four weeks, becoming their second consecutive chart-topper, after 2014's Evergreen. In Australia, the album entered the ARIA Top 100 Album Chart at a career-high position of 2, beaten out by The Getaway by the Red Hot Chili Peppers.

In the United States, Conscious sold 7,000 units in its first week and debuted at career highs of 5 and 7 on the Top Alternative Albums and Top Rock Albums charts, respectively. Conscious charted lower than its predecessor on the Billboard 200 (at No. 52) due to low streaming values but outsold Evergreen by twenty positions, reaching No. 25 on the Top Album Sales component chart.

== Critical reception ==
Professional ratings
Aggregate scores
Source	Rating
AnyDecentMusic?	7.0/10
Metacritic	74/100
Review scores
Source	Rating
AllMusic	4/5 stars
DIY	4/5 stars
Exclaim!	5/10
PopMatters	8/10 stars

Pryor Stroud for PopMatters noted "Broods have concocted a record of marked consistency, one that commands attention from its first wail to its last syllable."

Writing for Exclaim!, Tim Forster criticised the album's "failure to shake listeners awake and captivate them with memorable moments."

== Track listing ==
Track listing taken from iTunes.

No.	Title	Writer(s)	Producer(s)	Length
1.	"Free"	Georgia Nott; Caleb Nott; Joel Little	J. Little; Broods^{[a]}	3:43
2.	"We Had Everything"	G. Nott; C. Nott; J. Little	J. Little	3:23
3.	"Are You Home"	G. Nott; C. Nott; Ben Berger; Ryan McMahon	Captain Cuts	4:02
4.	"Heartlines"	G. Nott; C. Nott; J. Little; Ella Yelich-O'Connor	J. Little	3:17
5.	"Hold the Line"	G. Nott; C. Nott; Alex Hope	Hope; J. Little^{[a]}	3:33
6.	"Freak of Nature" (featuring Tove Lo)	G. Nott; C. Nott; Tove Nilsson	Hope; J. Little^{[a]}	4:00
7.	"All of Your Glory"	G. Nott; C. Nott	Broods	3:02
8.	"Recovery"	G. Nott; C. Nott; Hope; J. Little	J. Little; Hope^{[a]}	3:58
9.	"Couldn't Believe"	G. Nott; C. Nott; J. Little	J. Little; Broods^{[a]}	4:08
10.	"Full Blown Love"	G. Nott; C. Nott; J. Little	J. Little	3:30
11.	"Worth the Fight"	G. Nott; C. Nott; J. Little; Emmie Little	J. Little	4:03
12.	"Bedroom Door"	G. Nott; C. Nott; J. Little	J. Little	3:36
13.	"Conscious"	G. Nott; C. Nott; J. Little; Fransisca Hall	J. Little	4:00
Total length:				48:11

Notes

- ^{^[a]} indicates a co-producer

== Personnel ==
Credits adapted from Tidal.

Broods

- Caleb Nott – background vocals (1, 2, 4–6, 9, 11–13), drum programming (1), keyboards (1, 2, 4, 7–13), bass guitar (2, 5, 8, 10), programming (4, 9), percussion (8)
- Georgia Nott – vocals (all tracks), background vocals (1, 6), keyboards (2, 7, 8, 10–12), piano (5, 6), organ (7)

Additional musicians

- Joel Little – drum programming (1, 2), programming (1, 2, 4–6, 8–13), background vocals (2, 9, 13), keyboards (4–6, 8–13), percussion (8, 12)
- Captain Cuts – programming (3)
- Alex Hope – keyboards, programming (5, 6)
- Tove Lo – vocals (6)
- Olivia Nott – background vocals (6)
- Rachel Wells – cello (6)
- Mahuia Bridgman-Cooper – string arrangement, violin (6)
- Iselta Alison – viola (6)
- Jessica Hindin – violin (6)

Technical

- Rich Costey – mixer (1)
- Manny Marroquin – mixer (2–4, 6, 8–11, 13)
- Joel Little — engineer (1, 2, 4–6, 8–12), mixer (5, 7, 11, 12)
- Captain Cuts – engineer (3)
- Alex Hope – engineer (5, 6)
- Jason Huss – engineer (6, 7)
- Olly Harmer – engineer (6)
- Tove Lo – engineer (6)
- Martin Cooke – assistant mixer (1)
- Nicolas Fournier – assistant mixer (1)
- Chris Galland – assistant mixer (2–4, 6, 8–11, 13)
- Ike Schultz – assistant mixer (2–4, 6, 8–11, 13)

== Charts ==
=== Weekly charts ===
Chart (2016)	Peak position
Australian Albums (ARIA)	2
Canadian Albums (Billboard)	69
New Zealand Albums (RMNZ)	1
US Billboard 200	52
US Top Alternative Albums (Billboard)	5
US Top Rock Albums (Billboard)	7

=== Year-end charts ===
Chart (2016)	Peak position
New Zealand Albums (RMNZ)	21
