= Heartlines =

- Cheat Codes remix artwork

Single by Broods

from the album Conscious
- Released: 16 January 2017
- Genre: Synthpop
- Length: 3:17
- Label: Capitol; Island; Universal
- Songwriters: Georgia Nott; Caleb Nott; Joel Little; Ella Yelich-O'Connor
- Producer: Little

Broods singles chronology
"1000×" (2016)	"Heartlines" (2017)	"Peach" (2018)

Music video
- "Heartlines" on YouTube

"Heartlines" is a song recorded by New Zealand music duo Broods from their second studio album, Conscious (2016). Georgia Nott and Caleb Nott, the sole members of Broods, wrote the song with New Zealand singer Lorde and record producer Joel Little, who was responsible for production. It was first released on 10 June 2016 as the first promotional single from the album, and later as the album's second single on 16 January 2017. It is a synthpop track with electronic beats and synthesizers. Its lyrics detail the hope left in a tumultuous long-distance relationship.

"Heartlines" received mostly positive reviews from music critics, with many praising its production and lyrics. Its sound was compared to Lorde's 2013 album Pure Heroine. Commercially, it peaked at number three on the New Zealand Hitseekers chart and at 37 on the Billboard Adult Top 40 chart. Its accompanying music video, directed by Dano Cerny, stars New Zealand actress Rose McIver and Australian actor Oliver Ackland; it received media attention for its incorporation of bio-interactive Microsoft Band technology in collaboration with Microsoft.

== Background and composition ==
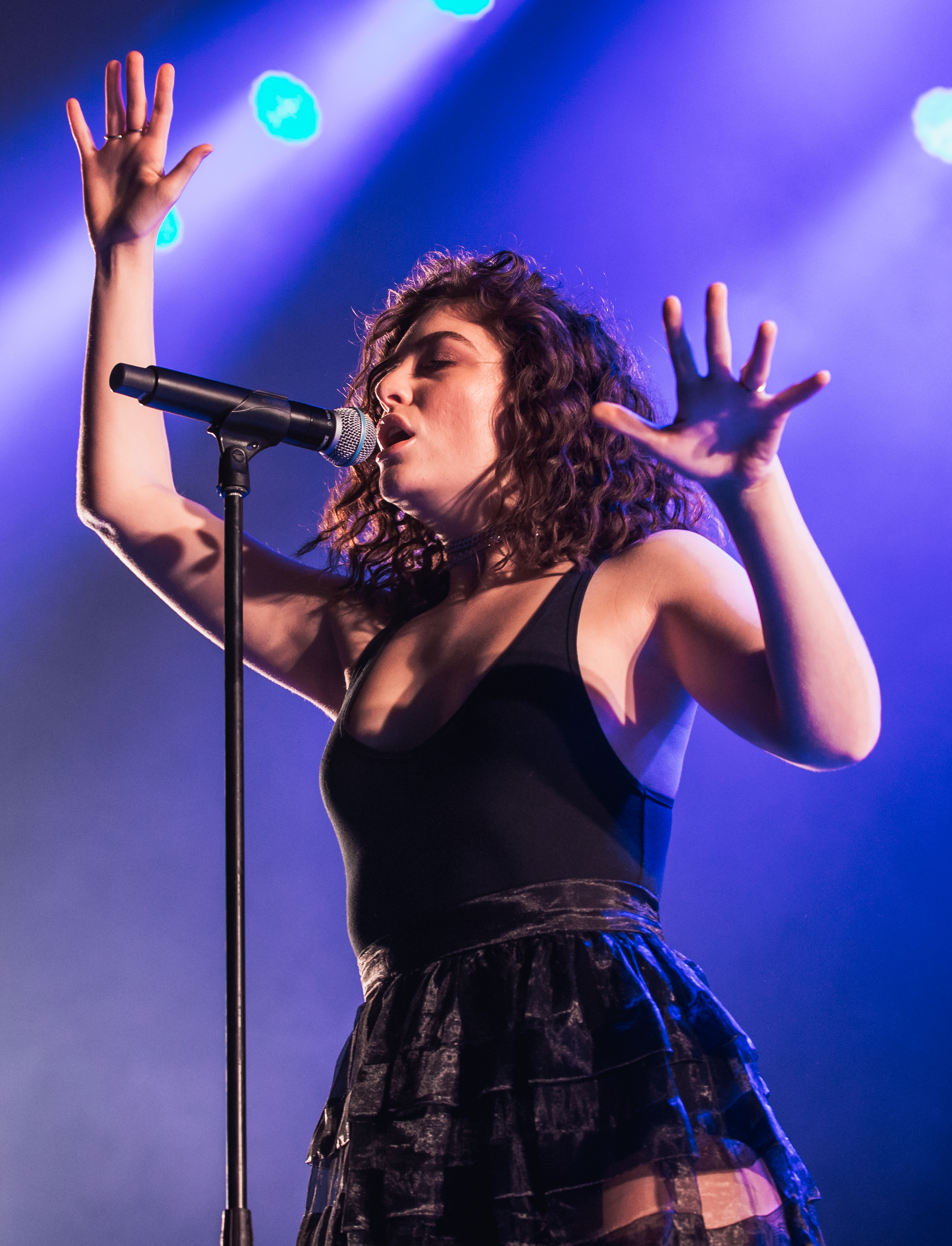
New Zealand singer Lorde co-wrote "Heartlines".

"Heartlines" was written by Georgia and Caleb Nott, who comprise Broods, as well as Lorde (credited under her birth name Ella Yelich-O'Connor) and Joel Little, who was responsible for production. Broods released an acoustic version of the track, and three remixes produced by Cheat Codes, Mount, and Race Banyon. "Heartlines" is a synthpop song with electronic beats in its production. Lyrically, the track explores the tumultuous emotional journey that goes along with a long-distance relationship. Joy Price of Complex noted the track's "aggressive and darker sound" from their earlier work. Several publications compared its production to Lorde's 2013 debut album Pure Heroine.

Georgia explained that the song was inspired by Caleb's undetermined relationship with a woman who lived "on the other side of the world". In an exclusive interview with The Line of Best Fit, Georgia said the track poses the question, "what if we saw each other more than twice a year". She mentioned that Lorde had a day off from touring and was in Auckland the same day they began recording the track, prompting Little to call her into the studio. The duo called their recording sessions with Lorde an "interesting experience", due to their different work methods. Idolator's Carl Williott described Georgia's vocals as "smokey" and compared her cadence to those of Lorde. Caleb revealed that "Heartlines" was the first song about his personal experiences. To promote the song, Broods posted handwritten lyrics of the track on their Twitter account.

== Reception ==
"Heartlines" received mostly positive reviews from music critics, with many praising its production and lyrics. The staff of music blog PopMatters gave the song an average rating of 6.25 based on four reviews. Stroud from the publication called it an "unimpeachable synthpop anthem", further commenting that the duo "continue to showcase this deft sense of sonic craftsmanship." In his mixed review of their album Conscious, Tim Forster of Exclaim! cited "Heartlines" as a "pleasing moment" in the record, stating that it "smoothly [executes] an ambiguous neither-major-nor-minor sentiment". Pryor Stroud of PopMatters characterized her vocals as a "weapon of pure emotional power and kinetic force".

Despite not entering the New Zealand Singles Chart, "Heartlines" debuted and peaked at number 3 on the New Zealand Heatseekers Chart, for the week of 20 June 2016. The same week, it debuted at number 5 on the New Zealand Artists chart. On the US Adult Top 40, the track peaked at number 37. In 2024, "Heartlines" was certified platinum in Australia for exceeding 70,000 equivalent units.

== Music video ==
The video utilizes a bio-interactive Microsoft Band from Georgia Nott's (pictured) movements to convert data into "geometric shapes".

The accompanying music video for "Heartlines" was directed by Dano Cerny and was produced in partnership with Microsoft; it premiered on Broods' YouTube channel on 27 June 2016. New Zealand actress Rose McIver and Australian actor Oliver Ackland star in the video as each other's love interests. The duo decided to cast actors instead of models to help give the video a "natural and real" feeling. It was filmed in a California desert.

Broods partnered with Microsoft for a bio-interactive video using the Microsoft Band smart band fitness device to track Georgia's heart rate, body temperature, and movements and then convert the data into "geometric shapes" that is superimposed onto the footage. Caleb explained that the purpose of this project was to "communicate on another emotional level, not just through audio and facial expressions". He revealed that the filming process was a challenge for production crew who had to "stay within range of Georgia's wrist" while also being "careful not to step into the frame".

The video begins with a panned shot of a woman (played by McIver) and a man (played by Ackland). The pair embrace each other in a desert with the trunk of a car opened. Georgia, dressed in a white crop top and pants, begins singing. They let go of each other's hands as they part ways. Ackland gets in his car and closes his eyes momentarily before driving away. In the next scene, McIver is seen entering her apartment; McIver, Ackland and Georgia's veins illuminate in light red color. Digitalized shapes appear and pulse around Georgia's neck generated by the Microsoft Band 2 fitness tracker.

Ackland parks his car outside a restaurant. In a separate shot, his lungs begin to glow. The scene transitions years into the future, with Ackland working at the restaurant from the previous scene. He turns to McIver's view, holding hands with another man. She leaves the restaurant with him in a convertible as Ackland stares out from a window. As the car leaves, Ackland rushes to see her, but she is no longer there. Looking uncomfortable, McIver advises the man to stop the car and gets off to meet Ackland. McIver walks through the middle of an empty street at daytime as the road cracks begin to glow. She runs towards Ackland, also near her view. The video ends with the pair sharing a passionate hug and kiss.

== Credits and personnel ==
Credited adapted from the liner notes of Conscious.

Recording and management

- Recorded at Golden Age Studios (Auckland, New Zealand)
- Published by Sony/ATV Music Publishing and Songs Publishing (ASCAP/APRA)

Personnel

- Caleb Nott – songwriter, programming, keyboards
- Georgia Nott – vocals, songwriter
- Ella Yelich-O'Connor – songwriter
- Joel Little – songwriter, producer, programming, keyboards, engineer
- Chris Gallard – mixing engineer
- Ike Schultz – mixing engineer
- Manny Marroquin – mixing engineer
- Emily Lazar – mastering engineer

== Track listing ==
Digital download
No.	Title	Length
1.	"Heartlines"	3:17

Digital download – Acoustic
No.	Title	Length
1.	"Heartlines" (Acoustic)	3:45

Digital download – Cheat Codes Remix
No.	Title	Length
1.	"Heartlines" (Cheat Codes Remix)	3:19

Digital download – Mount Remix
No.	Title	Length
1.	"Heartlines" (Mount Remix)	3:22

Digital download – Race Banyon Remix
No.	Title	Length
1.	"Heartlines" (Race Banyon Remix)	4:40

== Charts ==
Chart (2016–17)	Peak position
New Zealand Heatseekers Singles (RMNZ)	3
US Adult Pop Airplay (Billboard)	37

== Certifications ==
Region	Certification	Certified units/sales
Australia (ARIA)	Platinum	70,000^{‡}
^{‡} Sales+streaming figures based on certification alone.

== Release history ==
Country	Date	Format	Version	Label	Ref.
Worldwide	10 June 2016	Digital download	Original	Capitol; Island; Universal	
Worldwide	28 October 2016	Digital download	Cheat Codes remix	Capitol; Island; Universal	
United States	16 January 2017	Hot/Modern/AC radio	Original	Capitol	
