= Aotearoa Music People's Choice Award =

Annual New Zealand music award

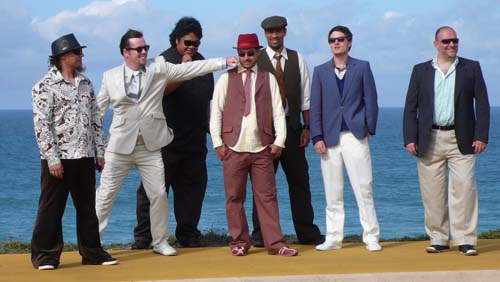
Fat Freddy's Drop is the only artist to win the People's Choice Award in two consecutive years.

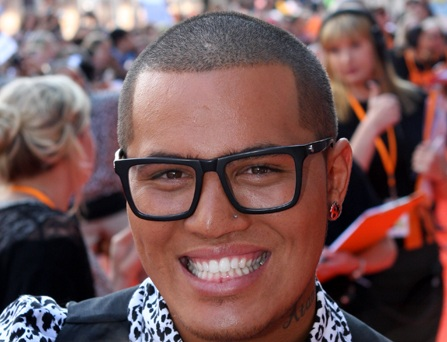
Stan Walker has been nominated for the People's Choice Award five years in a row, and he won in 2010 and 2014.

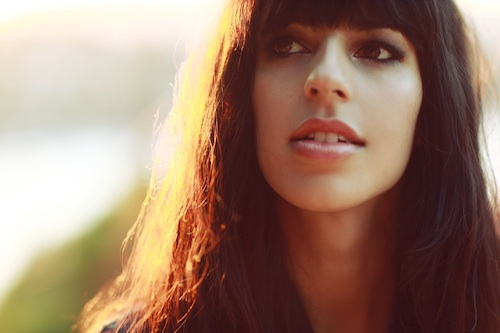
2011 winner, Brooke Fraser

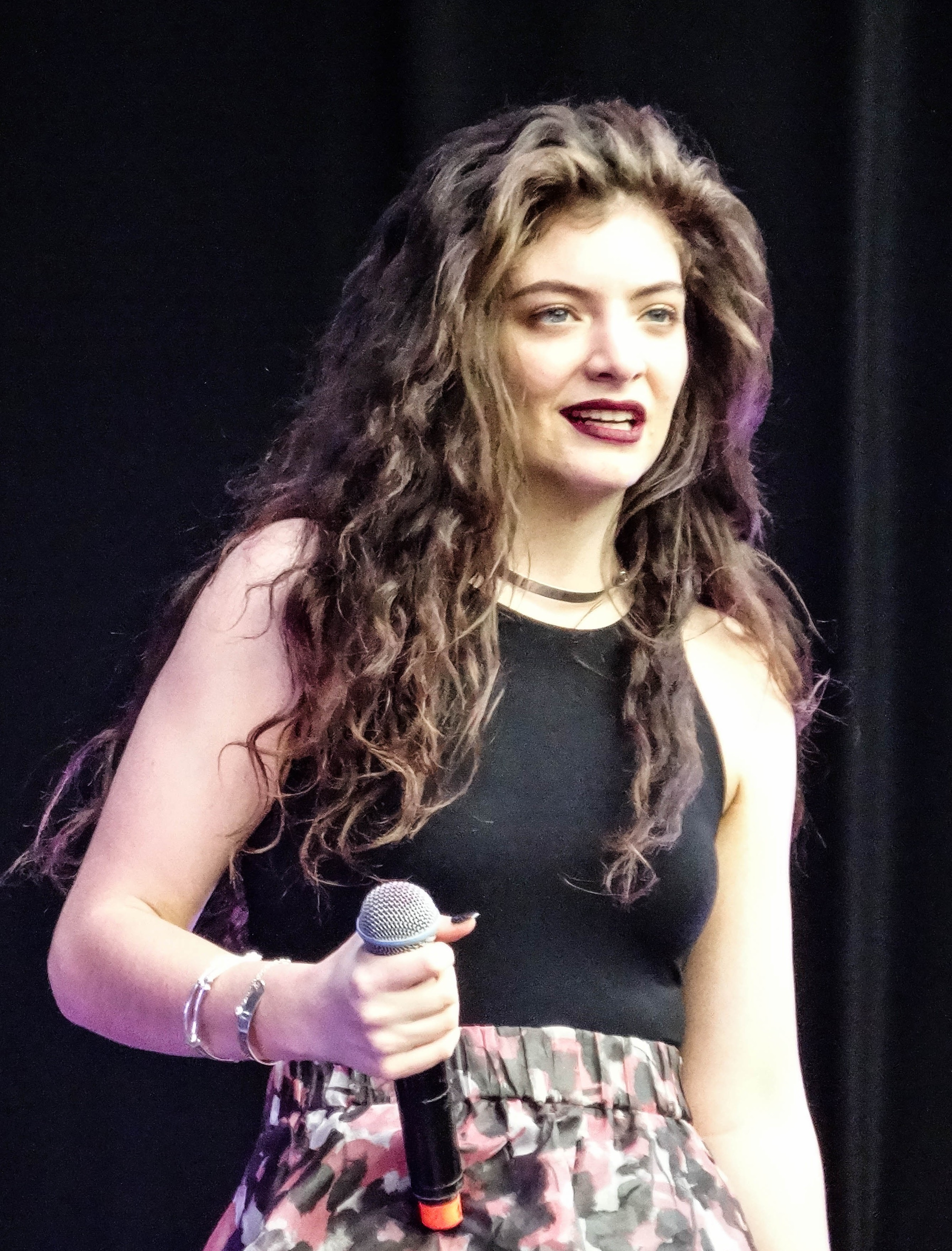
2013 and 2017 winner, Lorde

The Aotearoa Music People's Choice Award is an Aotearoa Music Award that honours New Zealand music artists, as chosen by public vote. The five finalists are determined by the Music Awards Committee, based on overall performance during the eligibility period. It is the only New Zealand Music Award decided by public vote.

In 2008, the award attracted controversy, after unknown Dunedin pop-rock band The DFender made the nominations shortlist. The band, who did not have any chart material, had extensively lobbied their fans on MySpace and gained the most votes in the initial nominations round. This prompted the call for the nominations to be chosen by Recorded Music NZ, a change that was eventually made.

The People's Choice Award was first awarded in 2004 to Scribe. Fat Freddy's Drop has won the award twice and been nominated two further times, while Stan Walker has won the award twice, with Walker having been nominated every year from 2010 to 2015. Lorde and Brooke Fraser have each won the award and been nominated a further two times.

== Recipients ==
Year	Winner	Other finalists	Ref.
2004	Scribe	Brooke Fraser; Goodshirt; Elemeno P; Steriogram; Zed	
2005	Fat Freddy's Drop	The Feelers; P-Money; Savage; Shihad	
2006	Fat Freddy's Drop	Frontline; Elemeno P; Goodnight Nurse; Pluto; Bic Runga	
2007	Opshop	The Black Seeds; Evermore; Brooke Fraser	
2008	Parachute Band	Antiform; The DFenders; Horsemen Family; Nesian Mystik	
2009	Smashproof	The Black Seeds; Fat Freddy's Drop; Ladyhawke; Midnight Youth	
2010	Stan Walker	Gin Wigmore; Dane Rumble; Kids of 88; Shapeshifter	
2011	Brooke Fraser	Ladi6; The Naked and Famous; Six60; Stan Walker	
2012	Six60	Gin Wigmore; Kimbra; Home Brew; Stan Walker	
2013	Lorde	Aaradhna; Shapeshifter; Stan Walker; Titanium	
2014	Stan Walker	Lorde; Sol3 Mio; David Dallas; Broods	
2015	Six60	Broods; Lorde; Sol3 Mio; Stan Walker	
2016	Broods	Fat Freddy's Drop; Kings; Maala; Sol3 Mio	
2017	Lorde	Kings; Maala; SWIDT; Theia	
2018	Six60		
2019	Six60		
2020	L.A.B.		
2021	Te Nutube		
2022			
2023	No awards held		
2024	Hori Shaw		
2025	Devilskin		
