= Horsemen Family =

- Years active: 2007–08
- Labels: Dawn Raid Entertainment

Horsemen Family is a hip hop group from New Zealand. At the 2008 New Zealand Music Awards, they were nominated for the People's Choice Award, but lost to the Parachute Band.

== Discography ==
=== Albums ===
- My Shout (2007)

=== Singles ===
- "Drink With Us" (2007)
- "Feels Like Magic" (2007) (No. 8, NZ)
