= Joel Little =

New Zealand producer and musician (born 1983)

- Born: 13 February 1983 (age 43); Auckland, New Zealand
- Occupations: Record producer; songwriter; musician
- Instruments: Guitar; keyboards
- Years active: 2003–present
- Label: Dryden Street
- Formerly of: Goodnight Nurse

Joel Little (born 13 February 1983) is a New Zealand record producer, musician and Grammy Award-winning songwriter. He has worked as a writer and producer with artists such as Lorde, Taylor Swift, Broods, Sam Smith, Imagine Dragons, Ellie Goulding, Khalid, Elliphant, Jarryd James, Shawn Mendes, Marina Diamandis, Amy Shark, Goodnight Nurse, Noah Kahan, Years & Years, the Jonas Brothers, Gracie Abrams, and Niall Horan.

== Career ==
Little trained at the Music and Audio Institute of New Zealand (MAINZ) in Auckland, and began his career as singer and guitarist of the pop punk band Goodnight Nurse. The band released two studio albums, Always and Never (2006) and Keep Me on Your Side (2008) both of which peaked at number five on the New Zealand top 40 albums chart. Over the two albums, the band had five singles in the New Zealand top-40 from 2004 to 2008.

Goodnight Nurse guitarist Sam McCarthy and Little produced and also co-wrote the majority of the debut album released by McCarthy's new group, Kids of 88. The album, Sugarpills was released in 2010 and debuted at number two in the New Zealand album chart. It featured three hit singles, "My House", "Just a Little Bit" and "Downtown" co-written by Little. "Just a Little Bit" went on to win Single of the Year at the 2010 New Zealand Music Awards.

In 2011, Little set up his own production studio, Golden Age, in Morningside, Auckland.

In 2012, Little co-wrote and produced, recorded and mixed The Love Club EP by Lorde at Golden Age. Singles "Royals" and "Tennis Court" both charted at number one in New Zealand in 2013, with the EP achieving gold certification in New Zealand and Platinum certification in Australia. Little also co-wrote, produced, mixed, engineered and played the instruments on the debut Lorde album, Pure Heroine, which was released worldwide on 30 September 2013.

In early September 2013, Little and co-writer Lorde were shortlisted for "Royals" in the 2013 Silver Scroll Award, which honours outstanding achievement in songwriting of original New Zealand pop music. They went on to win this award, at a ceremony on 16 October. He also won a Grammy Award on 26 January 2014, alongside Lorde, winning Song of the Year for "Royals".

Little produced Auckland-based pop duo Broods' single, "Bridges", subsequent EP, Broods, and their 2014 album, Evergreen.

In 2019, Little co-wrote and co-produced four songs with American singer-songwriter Taylor Swift for her seventh studio album Lover, including "Me!", "You Need to Calm Down", "The Man", and "Miss Americana & the Heartbreak Prince". Little and Swift also co-wrote and co-produced a fifth track, "Only the Young" which was left off the album. The track was released in 2020 in conjunction with Miss Americana, a documentary on Swift's life and career; Little appeared in the documentary.

As of 2014 Little is based in Los Angeles.

== Discography ==
=== With Goodnight Nurse ===
- Always and Never (2006) Festival Mushroom Records
- Keep Me on Your Side (2008) Warner Music New Zealand

== Production and writing credits ==
Year	Artist	Album	Song	Co-writer:	Producer or co-producer:
2026	Nick Jonas	Sunday Best	"The Greatest" (feat. Jonas Brothers)	✓	✓
2026	Josiah and the Bonnevilles	As Is	"Hell Without the Flames"	✓	
2026	Debbii Dawson	Where Have All the Good Men Gone (EP)	"Where Have All the Good Men Gone"	✓	✓
2026	Ruel	Kicking My Feet & Screaming	"Don't Say That"	✓	✓
2026	Niall Horan	Dinner Party	"Flowers"	✓	
2026	Suki Waterhouse	Loveland	"Any Man"	✓	✓
2026	Suki Waterhouse	Loveland	"Weirdo"	✓	✓
2025	Rita Ora	TBA	"All Natural"	✓	✓
2025	Maren Morris	D R E A M S I C L E	"Too Good"	✓	✓
2025	Maren Morris	D R E A M S I C L E and Intermission	"Cut"	✓	✓
2025	Noah Rinker	The Pines (EP)	"The Pines"	✓	
2024	Amy Shark	Sunday Sadness	"It's Nice To Feel This Way Again"	✓	✓
2023	Chelsea Cutler	Stellaria	"Your Bones"	✓	✓
2023	Tove Lo	Dirt Femme (Extended Edition)	"Elevator Eyes"	✓	✓
2023	Goodnight Nurse	Non-album single	"All Hail The Serpent Queen Part 3 of 3 (Trilogy) (Holy Hell!)"	✓	✓
2023	Niall Horan	The Show	"Must Be Love"		✓
2023	Niall Horan	The Show	"Science"		✓
2023	Niall Horan	The Show	"You Could Start A Cult"	✓	✓
2023	Niall Horan	The Show	"The Show"		✓
2023	Niall Horan	The Show	"Never Grow Up"		✓
2023	Niall Horan	The Show	"Meltdown"	✓	✓
2023	Niall Horan	The Show	"If You Leave Me"	✓	
2023	Niall Horan	The Show	"Heaven"	✓	✓
2022	Vance Joy	In Our Own Sweet Time	"Clarity"	✓	✓
2022	Years & Years	Night Call	"...Muscle"	✓	✓
2022	Years & Years	Night Call	"Hallucination"	✓	
2022	James Bay	Leap	"Nowhere Left To Go"		✓
2022	Imagine Dragons	Mercury - Acts 1 & 2	"Symphony"	✓	✓
2021	Noah Kahan	I Was/I Am	"Part Of Me"		✓
2021	Noah Kahan	I Was/I Am	"Animal"		✓
2021	Noah Kahan	I Was/I Am	"Caves"		✓
2021	Noah Kahan	I Was/I Am	"Bad Luck"		✓
2021	Noah Kahan	I Was/I Am	"Godlight"		✓
2021	Noah Kahan	I Was/I Am	"Someone Like You" feat. Joy Oladokun		✓
2021	Noah Kahan	I Was/I Am	"Fear Of Water"	✓	✓
2021	Noah Kahan	I Was/I Am	"Hollow"		✓
2021	Noah Kahan	I Was/I Am	"Bury Me"		✓
2021	Noah Kahan	I Was/I Am	"Howling"		✓
2021	Gracie Abrams	This Is What It Feels Like	"Better"	✓	✓
2021	Gracie Abrams	This Is What It Feels Like	"Wishful Thinking"	✓	✓
2021	Gracie Abrams	This Is What It Feels Like	"For Real This Time"	✓	✓
2021	Alessia Cara	In The Meantime	"Apartment Song"	✓	✓
2021	Tate McRae & Khalid		"Working"	✓	✓
2021	Vance Joy	In Our Own Sweet Time	"Missing Piece"	✓	✓
2021	Noah Kahan	I Was / I Am	"Part Of Me"		✓
2021	Elliphant	Rocking Horse	"Notorious"	✓	
2021	Imagine Dragons		"Follow You"	✓	✓
2021	Elliphant	Rocking Horse	"Drunk & Angry"	✓	✓
2021	Jarryd James	P.M.	"Slow Motion"	✓	✓
2021	Jarryd James	P.M.	"Miracles"	✓	✓
2021	Jarryd James	P.M.	"Stop Me"		✓
2020	Isaac Dunbar	evil twin	"love, or the lack thereof'	✓	✓
2020	Isaac Dunbar	evil twin	"Intimate Moments"	✓	✓
2020	Bishop Briggs		"Higher"		✓
2020	Amy Shark	Cry Forever	"Everybody Rise"	✓	✓
2020	Lennon Stella	Three. Two. One.	"Jealous"		✓
2020	Gracie Abrams	Non-album single	"21"	✓	✓
2020	Taylor Swift	Non-album single	"Only the Young"	✓	✓
2019	Tove Lo	Sunshine Kitty	"Mistaken"	✓	✓
2019	Bishop Briggs	Champion	"Jekyll & Hide"	✓	✓
2019	Foster The People	Pick U Up	"Pick U Up"	✓	✓
2019	Taylor Swift	Lover	"Me!" (feat. Brendon Urie of Panic! at the Disco)	✓	✓
2019	Taylor Swift	Lover	"You Need to Calm Down"	✓	✓
2019	Taylor Swift	Lover	"The Man"	✓	✓
2019	Taylor Swift	Lover	"Miss Americana & the Heartbreak Prince"	✓	✓
2019	Bishop Briggs	Champion	"Champion"	✓	✓
2019	Bishop Briggs	Champion	"Jekyll & Hide"	✓	✓
2019	Bishop Briggs	Champion	"I Tried"		✓
2019	K Flay	Solutions	"Sister"	✓	✓
2019	Noah Kahan	Busyhead	"False Confidence"		✓
2019	Noah Kahan	Busyhead	"Mess"		✓
2019	Noah Kahan	Busyhead	"Hurt Somebody (with Julia Michaels)"		✓
2019	Noah Kahan	Busyhead	"Young Blood"		✓
2019	Noah Kahan	Busyhead	"Cynic"	✓	✓
2019	Noah Kahan	Busyhead	"Save Me"		✓
2019	Noah Kahan	Busyhead	"Sink"		✓
2019	Noah Kahan	Busyhead	"Tidal"		✓
2019	Jonas Brothers	Happiness Begins	''Happy When I'm Sad''	✓	✓
2019	James Bay	Oh My Messy Mind	"Peer Pressure"		✓
2019	MARINA	Love + Fear	"Handmade Heaven"		✓
2019	MARINA	Love + Fear	"To Be Human"		✓
2019	MARINA	Love + Fear	"Life Is Strange"	✓	✓
2019	Terror Jr	Unfortunately, Terror Jr	"Pretty"	✓	✓
2019	Jarryd James		"Slow Motion"	✓	✓
2019	Broods	Don't Feed the Pop Monster	"Life After"	✓	✓
2019	Broods	Don't Feed the Pop Monster	"Too Proud"	✓	✓
2018	Lennon Stella	Love Me - EP	"La Di Da"	✓	✓
2018	Imagine Dragons	Origins	"Birds"	✓	✓
2018	NAO	Saturn	"Yellow of the Sun"	✓	✓
2018	Amy Shark	Love Monster	"Never Coming Back"	✓	✓
2018	6lack	East Atlantic Love Letter	"Switch"	✓	✓
2018	Daya		"Safe"	✓	✓
2018	Shawn Mendes	Shawn Mendes	"Youth (feat. Khalid)"		✓
2018	Shawn Mendes	Shawn Mendes	"Queen"		✓
2018	Mikky Ekko		"Moment"	✓	✓
2018	Robinson		"Nothing To Regret"		✓
2018	Alison Wonderland	Awake	"Church"	✓	✓
2018	Alison Wonderland	Awake	"No"	✓	✓
2018	Alison Wonderland	Awake	"Okay"	✓	
2018	Alison Wonderland	Awake	"Easy"	✓	✓
2018	Alison Wonderland	Awake	"Cry"	✓	✓
2018	Alison Wonderland	Awake	"Happy Place"	✓	
2018	Alison Wonderland	Awake	"Awake"	✓	
2018	Kailee Morgue	Medusa	"Unfortunate Soul"	✓	✓
2018	Noah Kahan		"Come Down"	✓	✓
2018	Noah Kahan	Hurt Somebody	"Hurt Somebody"		✓
2018	Noah Kahan	Hurt Somebody	"Catastrophize"		✓
2018	Noah Kahan	Hurt Somebody	"Passenger"		✓
2017	Kesha	The Greatest Showman Original Motion Picture Soundtrack	"This Is Me"		✓
2017	Lorde	Melodrama	"Supercut"		✓
2017	Lorde	Melodrama	"Green Light"	✓	
2017	Bebe Rexha	All Your Fault: Pt. 2	"The Way I Are (Dance with Somebody) (feat. Lil Wayne)"	✓	✓
2017	Imagine Dragons	Evolve	"Whatever It Takes"	✓	✓
2017	Ruth B	Safe Haven	"Mixed Signals"		✓
2017	Ruth B	Safe Haven	"Dandelions"		✓
2017	Ruth B	Safe Haven	"Unrighteous"		✓
2017	Ruth B	Safe Haven	"If This Is Love"		✓
2017	Ruth B	Safe Haven	"Young"		✓
2017	Ruth B	Safe Haven	"If By Chance"		✓
2017	Ruth B	Safe Haven	"World War 3"		✓
2017	Ruth B	Safe Haven	"Safe Haven"		✓
2017	Ruth B	Safe Haven	"In My Dreams"		✓
2017	Ruth B	Safe Haven	"First Time"		✓
2017	Khalid	American Teen	"Young Dumb & Broke"	✓	✓
2017	Khalid	American Teen	"8teen"	✓	✓
2017	Khalid	American Teen	"Therapy"	✓	✓
2017	Noah Kahan		"Young Blood"		✓
2017	Noah Kahan		"Sink"		✓
2016	Tove Lo	Lady Wood	"Imaginary Friend"	✓	✓
2016	Brooke Fraser	A Sides	"Therapy"	✓	✓
2016	Jarryd James	High	"1000x (feat. Broods)"	✓	✓
2016	Jarryd James	High	"Claim My Love"		✓
2016	Jarryd James	High	"How Do We Make It"		✓
2016	Broods	Conscious	"Free"	✓	✓
2016	Broods	Conscious	"We Had Everything"	✓	✓
2016	Broods	Conscious	"Heartlines"	✓	✓
2016	Broods	Conscious	"Hold the Line"		✓
2016	Broods	Conscious	"Freak of Nature (feat. Tove Lo)"		✓
2016	Broods	Conscious	"Recovery"	✓	✓
2016	Broods	Conscious	"Couldn't Believe"	✓	✓
2016	Broods	Conscious	"Full Blown Love"	✓	✓
2016	Broods	Conscious	"Worth the Fight"	✓	✓
2016	Broods	Conscious	"Bedroom Door"	✓	✓
2016	Broods	Conscious	"Conscious"	✓	✓
2016	Fitz and the Tantrums	Fitz and the Tantrums	"Do What You Want"	✓	✓
2015	Elliphant	Living Life Golden	"Step Down"	✓	✓
2015	Elliphant	Living Life Golden	"Where Is Home (feat. Twin Shadow)"	✓	✓
2015	Ellie Goulding	Delirium	"Paradise"	✓	✓
2015	Ellie Goulding	Delirium	"The Greatest"	✓	✓
2015	Half Noise		"Inside"		✓
2015	Jarryd James	Thirty One	"Do You Remember"	✓	✓
2015	Jarryd James	Thirty One	"Give Me Something"	✓	✓
2015	Jarryd James	Thirty One	"This Time (Serious Symptoms, Simple Solutions)"	✓	✓
2015	Jarryd James	Thirty One	"Underneath"		✓
2015	Jarryd James	Thirty One	"Undone"		✓
2015	Jarryd James	Thirty One	"Regardless" (feat. Julia Stone)		✓
2015	Jarryd James	Thirty One	"High"		✓
2015	Jarryd James	Thirty One	"Sure Love"		✓
2015	Daniel Johns	Aerial Love EP	"Aerial Love"	✓	✓
2015	Daniel Johns	Aerial Love EP	"Late Night Drive"	✓	✓
2015	Daniel Johns	Talk	"Aerial Love"	✓	✓
2015	Daniel Johns	Talk	"Cool On Fire"	✓	✓
2015	Daniel Johns	Talk	"Warm Hands"	✓	✓
2015	Daniel Johns	Talk	"Dissolve"		✓
	Lorde	The Hunger Games: Mockingjay, Part 1 – Original Motion Picture Soundtrack	"Yellow Flicker Beat"	✓	✓
	Lorde	The Hunger Games: Mockingjay, Part 1 – Original Motion Picture Soundtrack	"Meltdown"	✓	✓
	Lorde	The Hunger Games: Mockingjay, Part 1 – Original Motion Picture Soundtrack	"Ladder Song"		✓
	Lorde	The Hunger Games: Mockingjay, Part 1 – Original Motion Picture Soundtrack	"Flicker (Kanye West rework)"	✓	
2014	Elliphant	One More EP	"One More (feat. MØ)"	✓	✓
2014	Priory	Weekend	"Weekend"		✓
2014	Sam Smith	In the Lonely Hour: Deluxe Edition	"Reminds Me of You"	✓	
2014	Broods	Evergreen	"Mother & Father"	✓	✓
2014	Broods	Evergreen	"Everytime"	✓	✓
2014	Broods	Evergreen	"Killing You"	✓	✓
2014	Broods	Evergreen	"Bridges"	✓	✓
2014	Broods	Evergreen	"L.A.F"	✓	✓
2014	Broods	Evergreen	"Never Gonna Change"	✓	✓
2014	Broods	Evergreen	"Sober"	✓	✓
2014	Broods	Evergreen	"Medicine"	✓	✓
2014	Broods	Evergreen	"Evergreen"	✓	✓
2014	Broods	Evergreen	"Four Walls"	✓	✓
2014	Broods	Evergreen	"Superstar"	✓	✓
2013	Broods	Broods	"Never Gonna Change"	✓	✓
2013	Broods	Broods	"Pretty Thing"	✓	✓
2013	Broods	Broods	"Bridges"	✓	✓
2013	Broods	Broods	"Sleep Baby Sleep"	✓	✓
2013	Broods	Broods	"Taking You There"	✓	✓
2013	Broods	Broods	"Coattails"	✓	✓
2013	Lorde	Pure Heroine	"Tennis Court"	✓	✓
2013	Lorde	Pure Heroine	"400 Lux"	✓	✓
2013	Lorde	Pure Heroine	"Ribs"	✓	✓
2013	Lorde	Pure Heroine	"Buzzcut Season"	✓	✓
2013	Lorde	Pure Heroine	"Team"	✓	✓
2013	Lorde	Pure Heroine	"Glory and Gore"	✓	✓
2013	Lorde	Pure Heroine	"Still Sane"	✓	✓
2013	Lorde	Pure Heroine	"White Teeth Teens"	✓	✓
2013	Lorde	Pure Heroine	"A World Alone"	✓	✓
2013	Lorde	Pure Heroine	"No Better"	✓	✓
2012	Lorde	The Love Club	"Bravado"	✓	✓
2012	Lorde	The Love Club	"Royals"	✓	✓
2012	Lorde	The Love Club	"Million Dollar Bills"	✓	✓
2012	Lorde	The Love Club	"The Love Club"	✓	✓
2012	Lorde	The Love Club	"Biting Down"	✓	✓
2012	Timomatic	Timomatic	"AYO (That's What I Like)"	✓	✓
2010	Dane Rumble	The Experiment	"What Are You Waiting For?"	✓	

== Awards and nominations ==
=== APRA awards ===
==== APRA Awards (Australia) ====
The APRA Awards (Australia) are annually held by Australasian Performing Right Association to honour outstanding music artists and songwriters of the year.

Year	Nominee / work	Award	Result	Ref.
2014	Ella Yelich-O'Connor and Joel Little	Outstanding International Achievement Award	Won	
2016	Jarryd James and Joel Little	Pop Work of the Year	Won	
2021	"Everybody Rise" by Amy Shark (Written by Shark and Joel Little)	Song of the Year	Nominated	
2023	"Clarity" by Vance Joy (Written by Joy and Joel Little)	Song of the Year	Shortlisted	
2023	"Clarity" by Vance Joy (Written by Joy and Joel Little)	Most Performed Australian Work of the Year	Nominated	
2023	"Clarity" by Vance Joy (Written by Joy and Joel Little)	Most Performed Pop Work of the Year	Nominated	

==== APRA Silver Scroll Awards (New Zealand) ====
The New Zealand APRA Awards are held by the Australasian Performing Right Association to honour the finest songwriters and composers.

Year	Nominee / work	Award	Result	Ref.
2013	Ella Yelich-O'Connor and Joel Little for "Royals"	APRA Silver Scroll	Won	
2014	Broods and Joel Little for "Bridges"	APRA Silver Scroll	Nominated	
2014	Ella Yelich-O'Connor and Joel Little for "Team"	Most Performed Work in New Zealand	Won	
2014	Ella Yelich-O'Connor and Joel Little for "Royals"	Most Performed Work Overseas	Won	
2015	Ella Yelich-O'Connor and Joel Little for "Yellow Flicker Beat"	APRA Silver Scroll	Nominated	
2015	Joel Little and Jarryd James for "Do You Remember"	APRA Silver Scroll	Shortlisted	
2015	Joel Little, Georgia Nott and Caleb Nott for "L.A.F."	APRA Silver Scroll	Shortlisted	
2015	Ella Yelich-O'Connor and Joel Little for "Royals"	Most Performed Work Overseas	Won	
2017	Ella Yelich-O'Connor, Jack Antonoff and Joel Little for "Green Light"	APRA Silver Scroll	Won	

=== ASCAP Pop Music Awards ===
The annual ASCAP Pop Music Awards are held by the American Society of Composers, Authors and Publishers to honour the songwriters and publishers of the most performed pop songs in the United States. Some of his works (like those for Imagine Dragons) are controlled in the US by ASCAP's largest competitor, Broadcast Music, Inc. (BMI).

Year	Nominee / work	Award	Result	Ref.
2014	Ella Yelich-O'Connor and Joel Little for "Royals"	Most Performed Songs	Won	
2015	Ella Yelich-O'Connor and Joel Little - "Team"	Most Performed Songs	Won	
2015	Ella Yelich-O'Connor and Joel Little - "Royals"	Most Performed Songs	Won	

=== Golden Globe Awards ===
The Golden Globe Awards were established in 1944 by the Hollywood Foreign Press Association to celebrate the best in film and television.

Year	Nominee / work	Award	Result	Ref.
2015	Ella Yelich-O'Connor and Joel Little for "Yellow Flicker Beat"	Best Original Song	Nominated	

=== Grammy Awards ===
The Grammy Awards are awarded annually by the National Academy of Recording Arts and Sciences.

Year	Nominee / work	Award	Result	Ref.
2014	Lorde, artist; Joel Little, producer; Joel Little, engineer/mixer; Stuart Hawkes, mastering engineer for "Royals"	56th Annual Grammy Awards – Record of the Year	Nominated	
2014	Ella Yelich-O'Connor and Joel Little, songwriters for "Royals"	56th Annual Grammy Awards – Song of the Year	Won	

=== New Zealand Music Awards ===
The New Zealand Music Awards are awarded annually to musicians of New Zealand origin, by Recorded Music NZ.

Year	Nominee / work	Award	Result	Ref.
2014	Joel Little for Pure Heroine	Best Engineer	Won	
2014	Joel Little for Pure Heroine	Best Producer	Won	
2015	Joel Little for Evergreen	Best Producer	Nominated	
2016	Joel Little for Conscious	Best Engineer	Won	
2016	Joel Little for Conscious	Best Producer	Won	
