= Evergreen (Broods album) =

Studio album by Broods
- Released: 22 August 2014
- Recorded: 2013–2014
- Studio: Golden Age
- Genre: Alternative pop; trip hop; electropop; synth-pop
- Length: 41:19
- Label: Dryden Street; Island; Polydor; UMA
- Producer: Joel Little

Broods chronology
Broods (2014)	Evergreen (2014)	Conscious (2016)

Singles from Evergreen
- 1. "Mother & Father" Released: 19 June 2014; 2. "L.A.F." Released: 10 November 2014; 3. "Four Walls" Released: 24 January 2015

Evergreen is the debut studio album by New Zealand music duo Broods, which was released on 22 August 2014. Following the release of their self-titled EP, Broods, earlier that year, the album includes two songs from that EP and the new single "Mother & Father". Upon its release, Evergreen debuted at number 1 on the New Zealand Albums Chart and was certified gold by Recorded Music NZ for sales exceeding 7,500 copies. Songs from the album were performed live during the first half of 2014. Produced by Joel Little, known for his work with fellow New Zealander Lorde, the album explores alternative pop music, with influences of indie genres.

== Background and development ==
In January 2014, Broods released their self-titled debut EP, which was produced entirely by Joel Little. It was proceeded by the singles "Bridges" and "Never Gonna Change", which will both be on the album. The EP received very positive reviews and was successful in their home country of New Zealand, charting at number 2, behind Lorde's debut Pure Heroine. After the EP was released the duo embarked on a tour, which also went to the United States. During those concerts, songs from the album were previewed. In May and June, the duo opened the Australian and New Zealand tour dates for British singer-songwriter Ellie Goulding.

On June 12, the duo announced their first-ever New Zealand tour and on June 19 premiered the first single off the album, "Mother & Father". On July 3, MTV exclusively premiered the album track "L.A.F." and revealed the album artwork.

== Reception ==
Professional ratings
Review scores
Source	Rating
AllMusic	3.5/5 stars

The album debuted at No. 1 on the New Zealand chart, and No. 5 on the Australian chart. In the United States, the album reached No. 45 on the Billboard 200, No. 12 on the Top Rock Albums chart, selling 7,000 copies in its first week. It has sold 32,000 copies in the US as of May 2016.

== Singles ==
"Mother & Father" was released as the album's lead single on 19 June. It premiered June 18 on Zane Lowe's BBC Radio 1 show.

"L.A.F." was released digitally on 3 July 2014 as the first promotional "instant grat" single off the album. It has been confirmed as the second official single from the album, following the release of the song's music video on November 10, 2014. It is one of the tracks featured in the EA Sports video game, FIFA 15.

"Four Walls" was released digitally on 18 August 2014 as the second promotional "instant grat" single. It was later released exclusively in New Zealand as the third official single on January 24, 2015.

=== Promotional singles ===
"Everytime" was released in New Zealand on 21 August 2014 as the iTunes free single of the week, and serves as the third promotional single from Evergreen.

== Track listing ==
All tracks are written by Caleb Nott, Georgia Nott, and Joel Little, except "Medicine", written by Georgia Nott. All songs produced by Joel Little.

No.	Title	Length
1.	"Mother & Father"	3:07
2.	"Everytime"	3:41
3.	"Killing You"	3:33
4.	"Bridges"	3:11
5.	"L.A.F"	2:47
6.	"Never Gonna Change"	3:41
7.	"Sober"	4:02
8.	"Medicine"	4:42
9.	"Evergreen"	4:27
10.	"Four Walls"	3:28
11.	"Superstar"	3:46

== Personnel ==
Credits adapted from Tidal.

Broods

- Caleb Nott – vocals
- Georgia Nott – vocals, piano (all tracks), synthesizer programming (6)

Additional personnel

- Joel Little – producer, mixer, recording engineer, programming, synthesizer programming
- Vlado Meller – mastering engineer
- Olivia Nott – background vocals (8)
- Andrei Bildarean – assistant
- Bryn Roberts – assistant
- Jeremy Lubsey – assistant
- Richard Symons – assistant
- Adam Bryce – photography
- Anna Wili-Highfield – artwork

== Charts ==
=== Weekly charts ===
Chart (2014)	Peak position
Australian Albums (ARIA)	5
New Zealand Albums (RMNZ)	1
US Billboard 200	45
US Top Alternative Albums (Billboard)	7
US Top Rock Albums (Billboard)	12

=== Year-end charts ===
Chart (2014)	Position
New Zealand Albums Chart	19
Chart (2015)	Position
New Zealand Albums (RMNZ)	45

== Certifications ==
Region	Certification	Certified units/sales
New Zealand (RMNZ)	Gold	7,500^{^}
^{^} Shipments figures based on certification alone.

== Release history ==
Region	Date	Format(s)
Australia	22 August 2014	CD, digital download
New Zealand	22 August 2014	CD, digital download
Canada	7 October 2014	CD, digital download
United States	7 October 2014	CD, digital download
Germany	28 November 2014	CD, digital download
Ireland	28 November 2014	CD, digital download
Belgium	1 December 2014	CD, digital download
United Kingdom	1 December 2014	CD, digital download
