= Bridges (Broods song) =

Single by Broods

from the album Broods
- Released: 3 January 2014
- Recorded: 2013
- Genre: Indie pop; synth-pop
- Length: 3:11
- Label: Dryden Street; Island; UMA
- Songwriters: Caleb Nott; Georgia Nott; Joel Little

Broods singles chronology
"Bridges" (2014)	"Never Gonna Change" (2014)

"Bridges" is a song by New Zealand band Broods, from their debut self-titled extended play. It was released as the band's first single by Dryden Street Records, Island Records Australia and Universal Music Australia on 3 January 2014. It is also included on their debut studio album, Evergreen (2014).

== Background and composition ==
"Bridges" was written by Broods members Caleb and Georgia Nott and Joel Little. Georgia Nott conceived the song and recorded a demo, which was embellished by Little. "Bridges" is an indie pop and synthpop song, and contains piano and synth instrumentation. It is set in common time, and is written mostly in the key of E minor, but briefly switches to G major.

== Release ==
"Bridges" was posted on SoundCloud in October 2013, and was released for sale as a music download single by Dryden Street, Island Records Australia, and Universal Music Australia in Australia and New Zealand on 3 January 2014. Polydor Records released the download single in Canada on 14 January 2014; the same day Polydor released "Bridges" as a promotional single—the iTunes Store's free "Single of the Week"—in the United States. Capitol Records sent the song to US adult album alternative radio on 3 March 2014, and US modern rock radio the following day.

== Reception ==
"Bridges" entered the New Zealand Singles Chart at number eight on 13 January 2014 and spent three consecutive weeks at that position. It was on the chart for a total of eight weeks, and was certified Gold by Recorded Music NZ on 24 March 2014, which denotes the sale of 7,500 copies. In Australia, the song entered the ARIA Singles Chart at number fifty-seven on 20 January 2014 and peaked at number fifty-one. "Bridges" debuted at number thirty-six on the US Alternative Songs chart, and has since reached number twenty-five. As of August 2014, Bridges has sold 56,000 downloads to date in United States, according to Nielsen SoundScan.

== Charts and certifications ==
=== Weekly charts ===
Chart (2014)	Peak position
Australia (ARIA)	51
New Zealand (Recorded Music NZ)	8
US Hot Rock & Alternative Songs (Billboard)	45
US Alternative Airplay (Billboard)	25

=== Year-end charts ===
Chart (2014)	Peak position
New Zealand (Recorded Music NZ)	48

=== Certifications ===
Region	Certification	Certified units/sales
Australia (ARIA)	Platinum	70,000^{‡}
New Zealand (RMNZ)	Platinum	15,000^{*}
^{*} Sales figures based on certification alone.^{‡} Sales+streaming figures based on certification alone.

== Release history ==
Country	Date	Format	Label
Australia	3 January 2014	Digital download	Dryden Street; Island; Universal
New Zealand	3 January 2014	Digital download	Dryden Street; Island; Universal
Canada	14 January 2014	Digital download	Polydor
United States	14 January 2014	Promotional single (download)	Polydor
United States	3 March 2014	Adult album alternative	Capitol
United States	4 March 2014	Modern rock	Capitol
