= Free (Broods song) =

Single by Broods

from the album Conscious
- Released: 1 April 2016
- Genre: Synthwave; industrial
- Length: 3:43
- Label: Capitol; Universal
- Songwriters: Caleb Nott; Georgia Nott; Joel Little
- Producer: Joel Little

Broods singles chronology
"Four Walls" (2015)	"Free" (2016)	"1000×" (2016)

"Free" is a song by New Zealand indie pop duo Broods from their second studio album, Conscious (2016). It premiered via BBC Radio 1 on 30 March 2016 before being officially released to digital retailers via Capitol Records, Dryden Street, and Universal Music Australia on 1 April 2016 as the album's lead single. The song was serviced to American modern rock radio on 12 April 2016 through Capitol Records as the duo's third North American single.

== Composition ==
"Free" is a midtempo anthem about having the freedom to express oneself. The song was written by duo members Caleb and Georgia Nott alongside its producer, Joel Little. A synthwave song with industrial elements, it features prominent synth instrumentation and a rhythmic backbeat evoking a war drum; industry professionals have described the production as "menacing and liberating" as well as more evolved than their previous songs. Georgia Nott explained to Triple J that the song's thematic content arose out of a desire to produce "more mature" songs that deviate from the topic of love and address real issues in people's lives.

== Commercial reception ==
"Free" debuted at number 30 on the New Zealand Singles Chart dated 11 April 2016 and peaked at number 21. It also debuted at number one on the New Zealand Artists chart ranking tracks performed by local artists. In Australia, the song entered the ARIA Top 50 singles chart at number 35 on the chart dated 17 April 2016 and has since peaked at number 30.

In the United States, "Free" entered the Billboard Hot Rock Songs chart at number 47 on the chart dated 23 April 2016, their second entry on the chart. "Free" ranked as the most-added song on alternative radio for the week ending 16 April 2016, with 14 Mediabase-monitored stations. Despite this, it did not reach the Billboard Alternative Songs chart ranking airplay on the format for another two weeks, whereupon it debuted at number 38 on the chart dated 7 May 2016. It has since peaked at 26.

== Music video ==
An accompanying music video was directed by Jessie Hill and premiered on 31 March 2016.

== Chart performance ==
Chart (2016)	Peak position
Australia (ARIA)	30
New Zealand (Recorded Music NZ)	21
US Hot Rock & Alternative Songs (Billboard)	47

== Certifications ==
Region	Certification	Certified units/sales
Australia (ARIA)	Platinum	70,000^{‡}
New Zealand (RMNZ)	Gold	7,500^{*}
^{*} Sales figures based on certification alone.^{‡} Sales+streaming figures based on certification alone.

== Release history ==
Country	Date	Format	Label	Ref.
Worldwide	1 April 2016	Digital download	Capitol; Dryden Street; Universal	
United States	12 April 2016	Modern rock radio	Capitol	
