= Never Gonna Change =

- Lone Remix single cover

Single by Broods

from the album Broods
- Released: 29 January 2014
- Genre: Trip hop; synth-pop
- Length: 4:10
- Label: Polydor; Universal
- Songwriter(s): Joel Little; Georgia Nott; Caleb Nott
- Producer(s): Joel Little

Broods singles chronology
| "Bridges" (2014) | "Never Gonna Change" (2014) | "Mother & Father" (2014) |

"Never Gonna Change" is a song recorded by New Zealand music duo Broods for their debut EP, Broods (2014). It was released 29 January 2014 through Polydor Records as the primary single from Broods in the United Kingdom, and second from the EP overall.

== Background and composition ==
"Never Gonna Change" combines a "pulsating glitchiness" with synth instrumentation and a trip hop beat. Lyrically, the song is about heartbreak and the impossibility of a clean separation from someone after a relationship falls apart. As Georgia Nott revealed to The Fader, the song was inspired by a breakup and initially conceived by her, while Caleb was responsible for the arrangement. "I was a little bit annoyed at life cos I got dumped," she told the magazine, "so I had vent to the memo pad on my phone and then Caleb and I made it into something cooler."

== Critical reception ==
Sam Lansky at Idolator responded positively to the song, particularly Georgia Nott's "inimitable" vocals. Jon Tanners of the independent music blog Pigeons & Planes compared the song favorably to previous single "Bridges": "A bit more melancholic than anthemic introductory track "Bridges," "Never Gonna Change" marries the group's pop sensibilities with a sweeping, icy look at dysfunctional love [...], as expertly produced and affectingly written ... as its predecessor."

== Track listing ==
Digital download

- "Never Gonna Change" – 4:10

Digital download (Remix)

- "Never Gonna Change (Lone Remix)" – 5:57

== Chart performance ==
| Chart (2014) | Peak position |
|---|---|
| Belgium (Ultratip Bubbling Under Flanders) | 33 |
| New Zealand (Recorded Music NZ) | 40 |

== Release history ==
| Country | Date | Format | Label |
|---|---|---|---|
| Worldwide | 26 December 2013 | Streamed audio | Universal Music Group |
| United Kingdom | 29 January 2014 | Digital download | Polydor Records |
| United Kingdom | 21 July 2014 | Digital download (Lone Remix) | Polydor Records |
