= Broods (EP) =

EP by Broods
- Released: 31 January 2014
- Genres: Alternative pop; electropop
- Length: 20:03
- Labels: Dryden Street; Island; Polydor; UMA
- Producer: Joel Little

Broods chronology
Broods (2014)	Evergreen (2014)

Singles from Broods
- 1. "Bridges" Released: 3 January 2014; 2. "Never Gonna Change" Released: 29 January 2014

Broods is the debut extended play (EP) by New Zealand music duo Broods, first released digitally 31 January 2014 in select territories through Dryden Street, Island Records Australia and Universal Music Australia as the duo's debut studio effort. It was preceded by lead single "Bridges", which became a top-10 hit in their native New Zealand.

== Reception ==
Professional ratings
Review scores
Source	Rating
AllMusic	3.5/5 stars
The New Zealand Herald	4.5/5 stars
Sputnikmusic	4.2/5

Chris Schulz of The New Zealand Herald rated Broods four-and-a-half stars out of five, and praised the quality of the writing of the songs.

Broods debuted at number two on the New Zealand Albums Chart dated 10 February 2014, below Lorde's Pure Heroine. It reached number 30 on the Australian Albums Chart, and number 5 on the US Heatseekers Albums, number 45 on the US Top Rock Albums and number 164 on the US Billboard 200.

== Track listing ==
All tracks written by Caleb Nott, Georgia Nott and Joel Little.

1. "Never Gonna Change" – 4:11
2. "Pretty Thing" – 3:17
3. "Bridges" – 3:11
4. "Sleep Baby Sleep" – 3:00
5. "Taking You There" – 3:09
6. "Coattails" – 3:15

== Charts ==
Chart (2014)	Peak position
Australian Albums (ARIA)	30
New Zealand Albums (RMNZ)	2
US Billboard 200	164
US Heatseekers Albums (Billboard)	5
US Top Rock Albums (Billboard)	45

== Release history ==
Country	Date	Format	Record label
Australia	31 January 2014	Digital download	Dryden Street; Island Records Australia; Universal Music Australia
New Zealand	31 January 2014	Digital download	Dryden Street; Island Records Australia; Universal Music Australia
Japan	31 January 2014	Digital download	Polydor
United States	4 February 2014	Digital download	Polydor
Australia	14 February 2014	CD	Universal Music
New Zealand	14 February 2014	CD	Universal Music
