= Don't Feed the Pop Monster =

Studio album by Broods
- Released: 1 February 2019
- Length: 48:14
- Label: Neon Gold; Island; UMA
- Producer: Caleb Nott; Jack & Coke; James Flannigan; Jesse Shatkin; Joel Little; Kyle Shearer; Leroy Clampitt; Mark Rankin; Nate Campany; Thommy Schleiter

Broods chronology
Conscious (2016)	Don't Feed the Pop Monster (2019)	Space Island (2022)

Singles from Don't Feed the Pop Monster
- 1. "Peach" Released: 9 August 2018; 2. "Everything Goes (Wow)" Released: 16 November 2018; 3. "Hospitalized" Released: 11 January 2019; 4. "Falling Apart" Released: 25 January 2019

Professional ratings
Aggregate scores
Source	Rating
Metacritic	62/100
Review scores
Source	Rating
AllMusic	4/5 stars
DIY	3/5 stars
NME	3/5 stars
under the Radar	7/10

Don't Feed the Pop Monster is the third studio album by New Zealand duo Broods, released on 1 February 2019. Four singles, "Peach", "Everything Goes (Wow)", "Hospitalized", and "Falling Apart" were released prior to the album. The duo also began playing shows from November 2018 in support of the album.

== Background ==
After the release of their 2016 album Conscious, both Georgia and Caleb Nott took time off to pursue solo projects before reuniting in 2018, signing a new record deal with Neon Gold Records and releasing the lead single "Peach". Georgia Nott claimed that second single "Everything Goes (Wow)" was recorded in a tree house in Nicaragua: "We were there as part of a writing camp and it was one of the best experiences of our careers. It's about accepting the mortality of everything and finding peace in that." Georgia also stated for the album, the duo's aim was "to make songs that are true to us and without hiding behind any kind of façade".

== Singles ==
"Peach" was released as the lead single from the album on 9 August 2018, and reached number one on the NZ Hot Singles Chart, a component of the main singles chart that measures the "fastest-moving tracks by sales, streams and airplay". Second single "Everything Goes (Wow)" was released on 16 November 2018, and was called an "airy and fun" pop song and a "strong sign of things to come" by Uproxx. It also appeared on the NZ Hot Singles Chart at number 18. "Hospitalized" was released on 11 January 2019 as the album's third single.

"Peach" was used extensively by Australian television network 10 Peach in their on-air advertisements following the channel's rebranding in 2018.

== Track listing ==
All tracks are written by Georgia Nott and Caleb Nott, additional writers noted below.

No.	Title	Writer(s)	Producer(s)	Length
1.	"Sucker"	Thommy Schleiter	Schleiter	3:58
2.	"Why Do You Believe Me?"	Jakob Hazell; Svante Halldin	Jack & Coke	3:41
3.	"Peach"	Schlieter	Schlieter	4:15
4.	"Falling Apart"	Nate Campany; Kyle Shearer	C. Nott; Shearer; Campany	4:21
5.	"Every Time You Go"	Leroy Clampitt	Clampitt	5:00
6.	"Dust"	Schlieter	Schlieter	4:03
7.	"Too Proud"	Jenna Andrews; Joel Little	Little	3:10
8.	"To Belong"	James Flannigan	Flannigan	5:47
9.	"Old Dog"	Ellinor Olovsdotter	C. Nott; Mark Rankin	3:43
10.	"Hospitalized"	Clampitt; Chloe Angelides	Clampitt	2:57
11.	"Everything Goes (Wow)"	Annika Wells; Jesse Shatkin	Shatkin	3:24
12.	"Life After"	Little	Little	2:51

== Personnel ==
Credits adapted from Tidal.

- Chris Gehringer – masterer
- Mark Rankin – mixer (1–9, 11, 12), engineer (2, 9)
- Eric J Dubowsky – mixer (10)
- Thommy Schleiter – engineer (1, 3)
- Alex Wildwood – engineer (4)
- Leroy Clampitt – engineer (5, 6, 10)
- Joel Little – engineer (7, 12)
- Chloe Angelides – vocals (10)

== Charts ==
Chart (2019)	Peak position
Australian Albums (ARIA)	17
New Zealand Albums (RMNZ)	3
