= Yellow Flicker Beat =

2014 single by Lorde

Single by Lorde

from the album The Hunger Games: Mockingjay – Part 1
- Released: 29 September 2014
- Recorded: 28–29 August 2014
- Studio: Lakehouse (Asbury Park)
- Genre: Art pop; electropop
- Length: 3:52
- Label: Republic
- Songwriters: Ella Yelich-O'Connor; Joel Little
- Producers: Paul Epworth; Joel Little

Lorde singles chronology
"Glory and Gore" (2014)	"Yellow Flicker Beat" (2014)	"Magnets" (2015)

The Hunger Games singles chronology
"We Remain" (2013)	"Yellow Flicker Beat" (2014)	"The Hanging Tree" (2014)

Music video
- "Yellow Flicker Beat" on YouTube

"Yellow Flicker Beat" is a song by New Zealand singer-songwriter Lorde released on 29 September 2014 as the lead single from the soundtrack for The Hunger Games: Mockingjay – Part 1 by Republic Records. Written by Lorde and Joel Little and produced by Little and Paul Epworth, it is as an art pop and electropop song with minimal synthesisers, drums, and vocal samples in its production. Music critics compared its instrumentation style to the singer's work on her 2013 debut album Pure Heroine. The track's lyrics refer to the rise of Katniss Everdeen, the heroine of The Hunger Games (2008–2010) young adult dystopian novel trilogy.

"Yellow Flicker Beat" was well received by music critics, who praised its lyrical content for being more mature than that of Lorde's previous releases. Commercially, the song peaked at number 34 on the US Billboard Hot 100 and entered the record charts of several nations, including Australia, Canada and New Zealand. A music video for the song, directed by Emily Kai Bock, was released on 7 November 2014. Four days later, a remix of the song, titled "Flicker (Kanye West Rework)" and co-produced by Lorde and Kanye West, was released. Lorde performed the original version at the 2014 American Music Awards on 23 November 2014. The song was nominated for Best Original Song at the Golden Globe Awards and Best Song at the Critics' Choice Awards.

== Composition and release ==
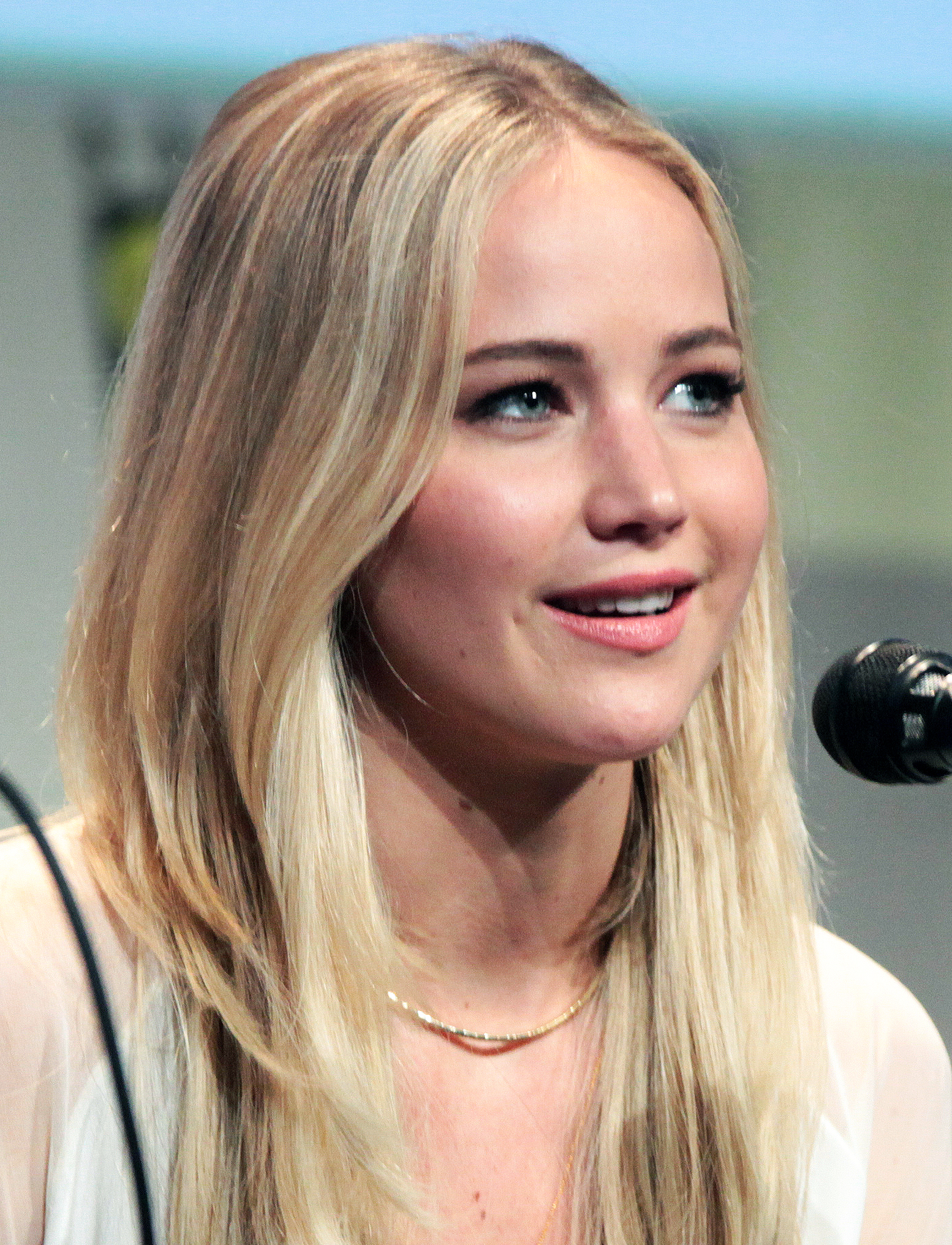
"Yellow Flicker Beat" references the rise of The Hunger Games' heroine Katniss Everdeen, portrayed by Jennifer Lawrence (pictured in 2015).

"Yellow Flicker Beat" was written by Lorde (credited under her birth-name Ella Yelich-O'Connor) and Joel Little and produced by Little and Paul Epworth. According to the sheet music published at Musicnotes.com, the track is composed in the key of A minor and follows the chord progression Am–Dm–Am–E and in the common time signature. The song moves at a tempo of 96 beats per minute, and Lorde's vocals span a range of E♭_{3} to E♭_{5}. "Yellow Flicker Beat" is an electropop and art pop song, with minimal synthesisers, drums, and vocal samples in its production.

The song's lyrics refer to the rise of Katniss Everdeen, the heroine of The Hunger Games (2008–2010) young adult dystopian novel trilogy. Beginning in a slow and measured way, the song features the "touched by pain" lyrics—"I'm a princess cut from marble / smoother than a storm." As the drums start, Lorde sings "This is the start". Zuel opined that the line was "also the beginning of the end of something". Carley noted that the lines, "The scars that mark my body / They're silver and gold" and "My blood is a flood of rubies, precious stones" showcased "a big step towards more mature lyrics" on Lorde's part. Music critics compared its production to the singer's work on her 2013 debut album Pure Heroine.

On 31 July 2014, it was announced that Lorde would be the curator for the soundtrack of The Hunger Games: Mockingjay – Part 1 (2014) after a recommendation from her publisher. On 23 September 2014, Lorde announced that the song, titled "Yellow Flicker Beat", would be released on 29 September 2014. "Yellow Flicker Beat" was recorded at the Lakehouse Recording Studios in Asbury Park, New Jersey on 28 and 29 August 2014. The song was engineered by Matt Wiggins and Erik Kase Romero. The song was released digitally on the iTunes Stores worldwide by Republic Records on 29 September 2014. The same day, it was sent to Italian contemporary hit radio and US adult album alternative (AAA) and modern rock stations.

== Critical reception ==
"Yellow Flicker Beat" received mostly positive reviews from music critics. Writing for Spin, Carley praised the song's metaphorical and mature lyrics. Rolling Stone writer Ryan Reed praised the track's production, writing that it "fits comfortably within the 17-year-old's sonic wheelhouse", while Billboard editor Steven J. Horowitz opined that Lorde's vocals complemented the song's "synth-blotched beat" well, and rated it three and a half out of five stars. Conversely, Chris Schulz of The New Zealand Herald wrote that "Yellow Flicker Beat" sounded too similar to Lorde's previous releases and lamented the lack of a catchy hook and chorus. Echoing Schulz's statements, Lydia Jenkin, also from the Herald, noted that while its sound was reminiscent of the singer's early works, it was still "a perfect musical depiction of Katniss Everdeen". "Yellow Flicker Beat" was nominated for Best Original Song at the 72nd Golden Globe Awards, and Best Song at the 20th Critics' Choice Awards. The song was ranked the 18th greatest song of 2014 by Australian alternative music station Triple J.

== Commercial performance ==
In the United States, "Yellow Flicker Beat" debuted at number 17 on the Billboard's Alternative Songs chart. In doing so, Lorde logged the highest launch by a female artist on the chart since 1995 when Juliana Hatfield's "Universal Heart-Beat" also debuted at number 17. The single also appeared on the Adult Alternative Songs at number 19 with 5.2 million radio audience impressions in its first week. On the Billboard Hot 100, the single peaked at number 34. "Yellow Flicker Beat" also charted on several national record charts, including Australia, Canada, Ireland, and the United Kingdom. The single was a success in New Zealand, peaking at number four on the New Zealand Singles Chart. It was certified platinum by the Recorded Music NZ, and the Australian Recording Industry Association (ARIA) for selling 15,000 and 70,000 units, respectively.

== Music video ==
This scene shows Lorde and other guests at a cocktail party smiling upwards toward the camera. Several critics compared the visual to the ending of the 1980 horror film The Shining.

The music video for "Yellow Flicker Beat" was directed by Emily Kai Bock, and was released on 7 November 2014 at midnight (NZDT), when Lorde turned eighteen years old. Lorde contacted Bock via email after they met through Devon Welsh, the frontman of Majical Cloudz, her opening band on the Pure Heroine Tour. The video was filmed in New Jersey and at Park Avenue Armory in New York during New York Fashion Week in between shows by American designers Marc Jacobs and Tommy Hilfiger. Lorde's production team built each set and shot the video in one day. The concept of the video was inspired by a 1976 interview from The Dick Cavett Show with American actress Mae West.

The video begins with Lorde singing in a faintly lit motel room, with a television displaying static and an unattended running car facing the window. The singer is styled in a white dress shirt, black slacks and her hair in a pompadour. The clip then showcases Lorde looking away from the camera in a room surrounded with potted plants. The camera moves away towards a dark, abandoned road filled by smoke with only one street light beaming on the singer. As the chorus begins, a group of teenagers form a circle and point a flashlight at Lorde as she dances inside a hangar, which critics described as "twitchy" and "witchy". In the next scene, the singer sits alone on the edge of a dark-lit public swimming pool. She then arrives at a cocktail party where she falls into what critics described as a "surreal cliff"; the singer revealed that she cut her foot filming this scene. The next shows her dancing besides a white curtain. The video ends with her sitting alone on a bus stop bench as the camera pans away.

The video received positive reviews from critics; it was praised for its concept but criticised for not incorporating footage from the film. Its visual direction was compared to the works of Australian director Baz Luhrmann and American filmmaker David Lynch. The singer's fashion was likened to that of American musician Prince, while her dancing drew comments to Swedish singer Robyn. Billboard's Zach Dionne praised the fashion choices on the video, calling it "awesome". MTV's Abby Devora wrote that Lorde "is [...] truly coming into her own" calling the visual a welcome change from her earlier videos, while Slant writer Alexa Camp stated that her performance in the video showed "elegance and sophistication." The scene where Lorde and other guests smile toward a camera at a cocktail party was compared to the ending of the 1980 horror film The Shining.

== Live performances ==
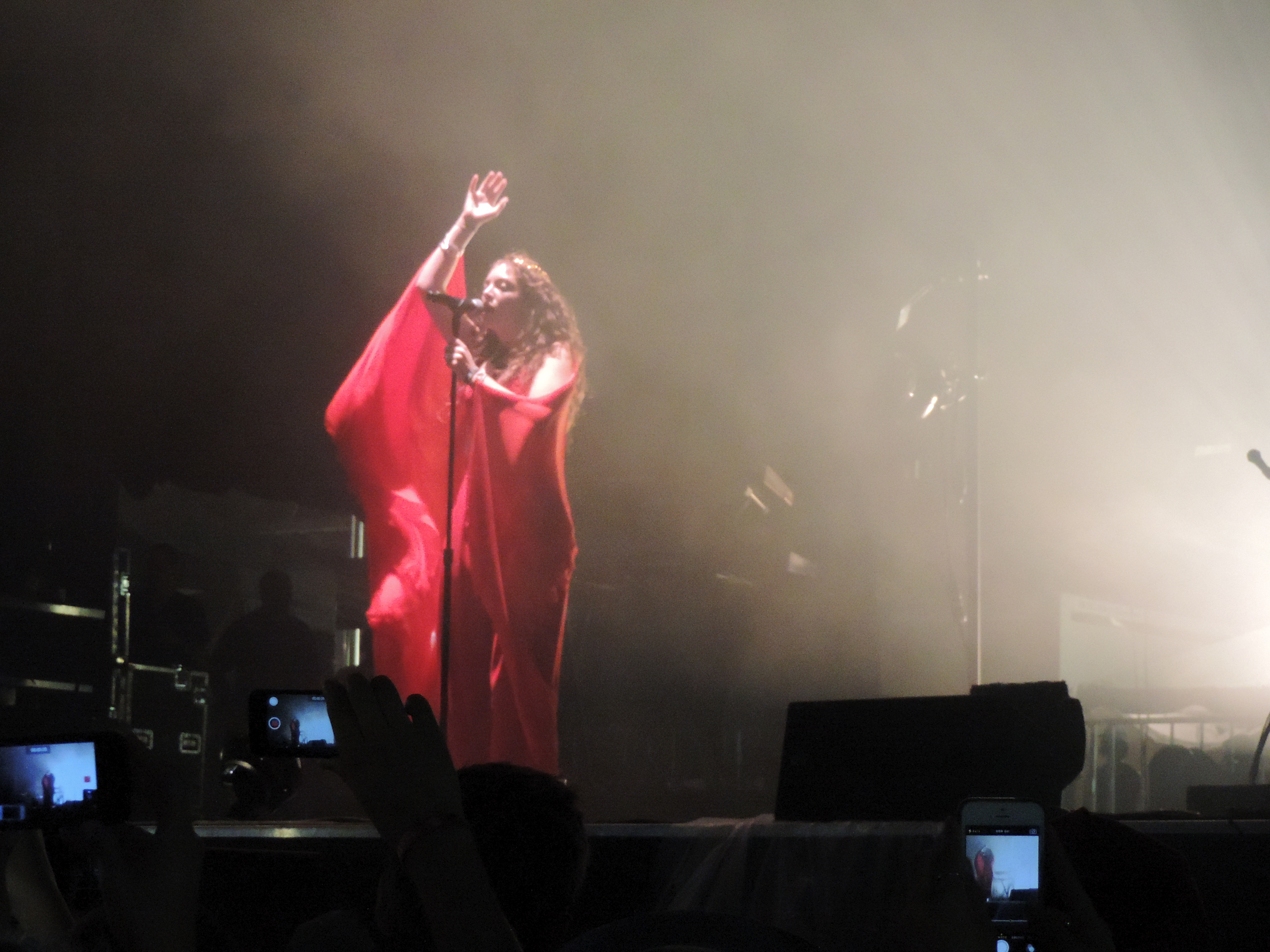
Lorde performing live at the Hearst Greek Theatre in Berkeley, California (2014)

On 2 October 2014, Lorde performed "Yellow Flicker Beat" for the first time at Hearst Greek Theatre in Berkeley, California. Later that month, she sang the song at the Austin City Limits Festival. The overall performance was praised. It was also performed as part of Lorde's Melodrama World Tour (2017–2018) during the North American arena leg.

Lorde performed the song at the 2014 American Music Awards on 23 November 2014. She began the performance by singing inside an "orange-lit box". Halfway through the song, the box was lifted, revealing Lorde wearing a white crop top and black pants outfit to the audience. She was accompanied by a group of white-clad dancers. She ended by smearing her lipstick on-stage. The performance was highly praised, particularly Lorde's stage presence and was considered one of the night's best by several publications. Miles Raymer of Entertainment Weekly gave the performance an A, writing that despite being the show's "most awkward moment", Lorde delivered a "dose of bracing weirdness". Rolling Stone compared her "thrashing and headbanging" to the music video of Nine Inch Nails' 1994 song "March of the Pigs". The publication also praised the singer's "exquisitely intimate and intense" moments inside the box in which she performed.

== Kanye West rework ==
"Flicker" (Kanye West rework)

Promotional single by Lorde and Kanye West

from the album The Hunger Games: Mockingjay – Part 1
- Released: 11 November 2014
- Studio: No Name Studios (Australia); Rowlands Audio Research (East Sussex, England)
- Genre: Trap; ambient
- Length: 4:13
- Label: Republic
- Songwriters: Ella Yelich-O'Connor; Joel Little; Kanye West; Noah Goldstein; Michael Dean
- Producers: Kanye West; Michael Dean; Noah Goldstein

Audio video
- "Flicker (Kanye West Rework)" on YouTube

Lorde and American rapper Kanye West produced a version of the song titled "Flicker (Kanye West Rework)", included on the film's soundtrack album, at a studio in Malibu, California. The track was made available for purchase on 11 November 2014. The pair first met in London after they made an appearance on Later... with Jools Holland in 2013. Talking about the collaboration with West, Lorde commented, "He's so private I feel weird talking about how he does stuff. I feel lucky to even be in a room with him."

"Flicker (Kanye West Rework)" was described as a trap and ambient song with bass, piano, electronic drums, and synthesizers in its production. The track slows the tempo of the original song, incorporates a choir, but does not feature West's vocals. Several music critics compared its production to West's work on his 2013 album Yeezus. Christopher Hooton, writing for The Independent, called it "understated and beautiful". Stereogum writer James Rettig described the rework as "grandiose and ominous". Billboard's Zach Dionne compared its instrumentation to West's singles "Clique" (2012) and "Runaway" (2010). Spin ranked the track at number 69 on their list of the 101 Best Kanye West-Produced Songs That Don't Feature Kanye.

== Track listings ==
Digital download

1. "Yellow Flicker Beat" – 3:52

Kanye West rework

1. "Flicker (Kanye West Rework)" – 4:12

== Credits and personnel ==
Credits adapted from the liner notes of The Hunger Games: Mockingjay, Part 1 (Original Motion Picture Soundtrack) and Tidal.

Recording and management

- Recorded at Golden Age Studios (Auckland, New Zealand) and Lake House Recording Studios (Asbury Park, New Jersey)
- Published by Sony/ATV Music Publishing LLC, Songs Music Publishing

Personnel

- Ella Yelich-O'Connor – lead vocals, songwriting
- Joel Little – production, songwriting
- Matt Wiggins – mixing
- Paul Epworth – production
- Hassan Rahim – graphic designer

== Charts ==
=== Weekly charts ===
Chart (2014)	Peak position
Australia (ARIA)	25
Austria (Ö3 Austria Top 40)	35
Belgium (Ultratip Bubbling Under Flanders)	3
Canada Hot 100 (Billboard)	21
Canada Rock (Billboard)	21
France (SNEP)	93
Germany (GfK)	38
Hungary (Single Top 40)	16
Ireland (IRMA)	83
Italy (FIMI)	86
New Zealand (Recorded Music NZ)	4
New Zealand Digital Songs (Billboard)	1
Scottish Singles Sales (Official Charts)	54
Switzerland (Schweizer Hitparade)	27
UK Singles (Official Charts)	71
US Billboard Hot 100	34
US Alternative Airplay (Billboard)	10
US Hot Rock & Alternative Songs (Billboard)	3

=== Year-end charts ===
Chart (2014)	Position
New Zealand (Recorded Music NZ)	48
US Hot Rock Songs (Billboard)	56
Chart (2015)	Position
US Hot Rock Songs (Billboard)	24

== Certifications ==
Region	Certification	Certified units/sales
Australia (ARIA)	Platinum	70,000^{‡}
Brazil (Pro-Música Brasil)	Platinum	60,000^{‡}
Canada (Music Canada)	Platinum	80,000^{‡}
New Zealand (RMNZ)	Platinum	15,000^{*}
United States (RIAA)	Platinum	1,000,000^{‡}
^{*} Sales figures based on certification alone.^{‡} Sales+streaming figures based on certification alone.

== Radio and release history ==
Region	Date	Format	Label
Australia	29 September 2014	Digital download	Republic
Belgium	29 September 2014	Digital download	Republic
Canada	29 September 2014	Digital download	Republic
Finland	29 September 2014	Digital download	Republic
Germany	29 September 2014	Digital download	Republic
New Zealand	29 September 2014	Digital download	Republic
Portugal	29 September 2014	Digital download	Republic
Spain	29 September 2014	Digital download	Republic
Switzerland	29 September 2014	Digital download	Republic
United Kingdom	29 September 2014	Digital download	Republic
United States	29 September 2014	Digital download	Republic
Italy	29 September 2014	Contemporary hit radio	Universal
United States	29 September 2014	Adult album alternative	Lava; Republic
United States	29 September 2014	Modern rock	Lava; Republic
