= Mother & Father =

Single by Broods

from the album Evergreen
- Released: 19 June 2014
- Genre: Electropop
- Length: 3:07
- Label: Universal; Polydor; Capitol
- Songwriters: Joel Little; Caleb Nott; Georgia Nott
- Producer: Joel Little

Broods singles chronology
"Never Gonna Change" (2014)	"Mother & Father" (2014)	"L.A.F." (2014)

"Mother & Father" is a song by New Zealand musical duo Broods from their debut studio album, Evergreen (2014). As with the material on their self-titled debut EP, "Mother & Father" was written by duo members Caleb and Georgia Nott as well as producer Joel Little. It was released as the album's lead single on 19 June 2014 through Polydor Records. The song entered the New Zealand Singles Chart at number forty on 30 June 2014, then moved to number fourteen the following week.

== Critical reception ==
Bradley Stern of music blog Idolator described the song as "nothing short of an emotional triumph" and applauded the duo's artistic and emotional growth. "It's the sound of growing up," writes Stern, "still unsure, but soldiering on anyway — and they’ve captured it wonderfully in this promising first taste of what’s to come." Timothy Monger at AllMusic complimented the stylistic layers to the duo's music, writing that "the massive hooks and neatly stacked vocals on standouts like "Mother & Father" and the kinetic "L.A.F." showcase the duo's command of enchanting and melodic indie electropop."

== Music video ==
Directed by Jordan Arts, the music video for "Mother & Father" was made available on 15 July 2014 and is shown in black-and-white.

== Live performances ==
On 17 July 2014, Broods performed "Mother & Father" on the talk show Late Night with Seth Meyers.

== Charts and certifications ==
=== Weekly charts ===
Chart (2014)	Peak position
Australia (ARIA)	54
New Zealand (Recorded Music NZ)	12
US Alternative Airplay (Billboard)	36

=== Certifications ===
Region	Certification	Certified units/sales
Australia (ARIA)	Gold	35,000^{‡}
New Zealand (RMNZ)	Platinum	15,000^{*}
^{*} Sales figures based on certification alone.^{‡} Sales+streaming figures based on certification alone.

== Release history ==
Region	Date	Format	Record label
Canada	19 June 2014	Digital download	Polydor Records
United Kingdom	19 June 2014	Digital download	Polydor Records
United States	19 June 2014	Digital download	Polydor Records
New Zealand	20 June 2014	Digital download	Dryden Street; Island Records Australia; Universal Music Australia
United States	5 August 2014	Modern rock	Capitol Records
