= The Dandy Warhols discography =

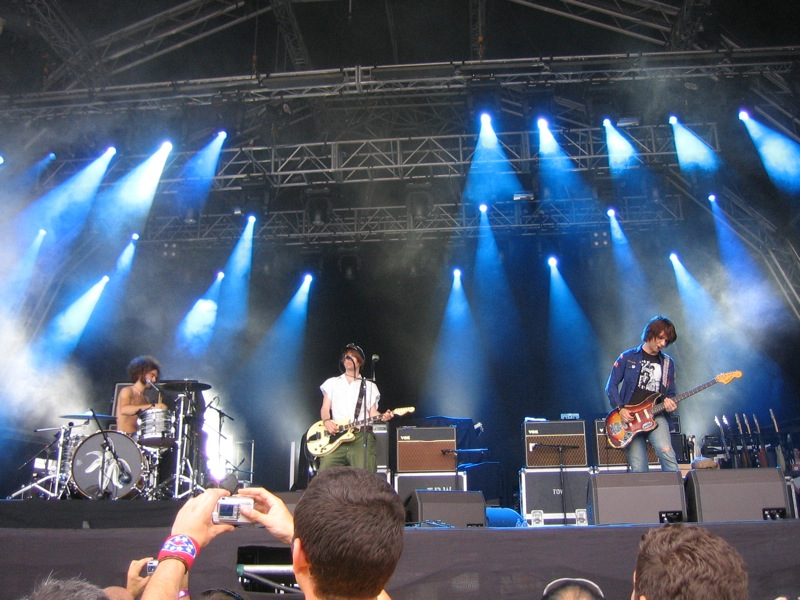
- Studio albums: 12
- Extended plays: 6
- Live albums: 5
- Compilation albums: 2
- Singles: 28
- Music videos: 31

The discography of the Dandy Warhols, an American alternative rock band from Portland, Oregon, consists of twelve studio albums, five live albums, two compilation albums, six extended plays and twenty-eight singles.

Their biggest international hit "Bohemian Like You" was certified silver in the UK while also peaking at number five in Italy.

== Albums ==
=== Studio albums ===
Title	Details	Peak chart positions										Certifications
Title	Details	US	AUS	BEL	FRA	IRE	NLD	NZ	NOR	SWI	UK	Certifications
Dandys Rule OK	Released: April 6, 1995; Label: Tim/Kerr	—	—	—	—	—	—	—	—	—	93	
...The Dandy Warhols Come Down	Released: July 15, 1997; Label: Capitol	— (Note: ...The Dandy Warhols Come Down did not enter the US Billboard 200, but peaked at number 22 on the US Heatseekers Albums Chart.)	91	—	—	—	86	—	—	—	16	BPI: Gold
Thirteen Tales from Urban Bohemia	Released: August 1, 2000; Label: Capitol	182	25	—	—	22	70	37	18	—	32	ARIA: Gold; BPI: Gold
Welcome to the Monkey House	Released: May 5, 2003; Label: Capitol	118	5	46	62	19	—	31	3	83	20	ARIA: Gold
Odditorium or Warlords of Mars	Released: September 13, 2005; Label: Capitol	89	19	—	52	75	—	—	18	85	67	
...Earth to the Dandy Warhols...	Released: May 5, 2008; Label: Beat the World	128	25	—	107	—	—	37	—	—	149	
The Dandy Warhols Are Sound	Released: July 14, 2009; Label: Beat the World	—	—	—	—	—	—	—	—	—	—	
This Machine	Released: April 24, 2012; Label: Beat the World	88	97	172	68	—	99	—	—	65	—	
Distortland	Released: April 8, 2016; Label: Beat the World, Dine Alone	—	57	75	98	—	—	—	—	84	131	
Why You So Crazy	Released: January 25, 2019; Label: Beat the World, Dine Alone	—	—	96	136	—	—	—	—	—	— (Note: Why You So Crazy did not enter the UK Albums Chart, but peaked at number 95 on the UK Album Sales Chart.)	
Tafelmuzik Means More When You're Alone	Released: April 1, 2020; Label: Self-released	—	—	—	—	—	—	—	—	—	—	
Rockmaker	Released: March 15, 2024; Label: Sunset Blvd, Beat the World	—	—	—	—	—	—	—	—	—	— (Note: Rockmaker did not enter the UK Albums Chart, but peaked at number 70 on the UK Album Sales Chart.)	
"—" denotes items that did not chart or were not released in that territory.

=== Live albums ===
Title	Details
Live at the Mission	Released: November 29, 2013
Thirteen Tales from Urban Bohemia Live at the Wonder	Released: April 29, 2014
Live from the X-Ray Cafe	Released: April 15, 2016
Live Sonic Disruption	Released: July 19, 2017
Live from Cowboy Christmas	Released: May 4, 2018

=== Compilation albums ===
Title	Details	Peak chart positions
Title	Details	GRE
The Black Album/Come On Feel The Dandy Warhols	Released: April 20, 2004; Label: Beat the World	—
The Capitol Years 1995–2007	Released: July 19, 2010; Label: Capitol	16
"—" denotes items that did not chart or were not released in that territory.

== Extended plays ==
Year	Title	Track listing
1997	Little Drummer Boy: Label: Capitol	1. "Little Drummer Boy"; 2. "One (Ultra Lame White Boy)"; 3. "Head"
2000	Tales from Slabtown: Label: Capitol	1. "Godless"; 2. "Shakin'"; 3. "Lance"; 4. "Kinky"; 5. "Phone Call"
2000	Tales from Slabtown Vol. 2: Label: Capitol	1. "Hells Bells"; 2. "Ohio"; 3. "Bohemian Like You" (Black Dog Lithium Carbonate 300 MG Mix); 4. "Dub Song"; 5. "Retarded"
2000	Bohemian Like You: Australian Tour EP: Label: Capitol	1. "Bohemian Like You"; 2. "Not If You Were the Last Junkie on Earth (Heroin Is So Passe)"; 3. "Minnesoter"; 4. "Get Off" (C11H15NO2 Mix); 5. "Hells Bells"
2008	Earth to the Remix E.P.: Volume One: Label: Beat the World	1. "Come the Fuck On"; 2. "The Monster Mish"; 3. "Welcome to the Skin-Up Remix"; 4. "Dub in the Lotus"
2009	Earth to the Remix E.P.: Volume Two: Label: Beat the World	1. "And Then I Remixed of Yes"; 2. "When the Talk Radio Breaks"; 3. "Love Song"; 4. "Now You Love My Remix"

== Singles ==
Title	Year	Peak chart positions										Certifications	Album
Title	Year	US Alt.	AUS	EU	GER	IRE	ITA	NLD	SCO	SWI	UK	Certifications	Album
"The Dandy Warhols T.V. Theme Song"	1995	—	—	—	—	—	—	—	—	—	—		Dandys Rule OK
"Ride"	1995	—	—	—	—	—	—	—	—	—	—		Dandys Rule OK
"Not If You Were the Last Junkie on Earth"	1997	31	47	73	—	—	—	98	12	—	13		...The Dandy Warhols; Come Down
"Every Day Should Be a Holiday"	1997	—	—	—	—	—	—	—	28	—	29		...The Dandy Warhols; Come Down
"Boys Better"	1998	—	—	—	—	—	—	—	32	—	36		...The Dandy Warhols; Come Down
"Good Morning"	1998	—	—	—	—	—	—	—	—	—	—		...The Dandy Warhols; Come Down
"Get Off"	2000	—	—	—	—	—	—	—	35	—	34		Thirteen Tales from Urban Bohemia
"Bohemian Like You"	2000	28	74	20	42	17	5	24	4	49	5	BPI: Gold	Thirteen Tales from Urban Bohemia
"Godless"	2001	—	—	—	—	—	—	86	84	—	66		Thirteen Tales from Urban Bohemia
"We Used to Be Friends"	2003	—	46	—	—	45	42	—	16	—	18		Welcome to the Monkey House
"You Were the Last High"	2003	—	71	—	—	—	—	—	43	—	34		Welcome to the Monkey House
"Plan A"	2003	—	—	—	—	—	—	—	78	—	66		Welcome to the Monkey House
"Smoke It"	2005	—	—	—	—	—	—	—	58	—	59		Odditorium or Warlords of Mars
"All the Money or the Simple Life Honey"	2005	—	—	—	—	—	—	—	68	—	83		Odditorium or Warlords of Mars
"Horny as a Dandy" (with Mousse T.)	2006	—	30	—	40	22	10	38	13	30	17		Non-album singles
"The World Come On"	2008	—	—	—	—	—	—	—	—	—	—		...Earth to the Dandy Warhols...
"Mission Control"	2008	—	—	—	—	—	—	—	—	—	—		...Earth to the Dandy Warhols...
"Mis Amigos"	2008	—	—	—	—	—	—	—	—	—	—		...Earth to the Dandy Warhols...
"Sad Vacation"	2012	—	—	—	—	—	—	—	—	—	—		This Machine
"The Autumn Carnival"	2012	—	—	—	—	—	—	—	—	—	—		This Machine
"Chauncey P. vs. All the Girls in London"	2015	—	—	—	—	—	—	—	—	—	—		Distortland
"You Are Killing Me"	2016	—	—	—	—	—	—	—	—	—	—		Distortland
"STYGGO"	2016	—	—	—	—	—	—	—	—	—	—		Distortland
"Catcher in the Rye"	2016	—	—	—	—	—	—	—	—	—	—		Distortland
"Be Alright"	2018	—	—	—	—	—	—	—	—	—	—		Why You So Crazy
"Motor City Steel"	2019	—	—	—	—	—	—	—	—	—	—		Why You So Crazy
"The Summer of Hate"	2023	—	—	—	—	—	—	—	—	—	—		Rockmaker
"Danzig with Myself"	2024	—	—	—	—	—	—	—	—	—	—		Rockmaker
"I'd Like to Help You with Your Problem"	2024	—	—	—	—	—	—	—	—	—	—		Rockmaker
"—" denotes items that did not chart or were not released in that territory.

=== Promotional singles ===
Title	Year	Album
"Have a Kick Ass Summer"	2006	Non-album single
"Blackbird"	2009	Non-album single

== Other appearances ==
Year	Title	Album
2005	"All I Have to Do Is Dream"	Stubbs the Zombie
2007	"Good Luck Chuck"	Good Luck Chuck

== Music videos ==
Year	Video	Director	Album
1994	"The Little Drummer Boy"		non-album video
1995	"Ride"		Dandys Rule OK
1995	"The Dandy Warhols' T.V. Theme Song"		Dandys Rule OK
1995	"Nothin' To Do"		Dandys Rule OK
1997	"Boys Better"	Ondi Timoner	...The Dandy Warhols Come Down
1998	"Not If You Were the Last Junkie on Earth"	David LaChapelle	...The Dandy Warhols Come Down
1998	"Every Day Should Be a Holiday"	David Palmer, Sidney Bartholomew	...The Dandy Warhols Come Down
1998	"Good Morning"	David Palmer	...The Dandy Warhols Come Down
2000	"Godless"	Chris Anthony	Thirteen Tales from Urban Bohemia
2000	"Get Off"		Thirteen Tales from Urban Bohemia
2000	"Bohemian Like You"	Courtney Taylor-Taylor	Thirteen Tales from Urban Bohemia
2001	"Horse Pills"		Thirteen Tales from Urban Bohemia
2003	"We Used to Be Friends"	Courtney Taylor and David Palmer	Welcome to the Monkey House
2003	"The Last High"		Welcome to the Monkey House
2003	"Plan A"		Welcome to the Monkey House
2003	"Scientist"		Welcome to the Monkey House
2005	"Smoke It"		Odditorium or Warlords of Mars
2005	"All the Money or the Simple Life Honey"		Odditorium or Warlords of Mars
2006	"Horny as a Dandy"		non-album video
2008	"Mis Amigos"	Dan Portrait/Kamp Grizzly	...Earth to the Dandy Warhols...
2008	"Talk Radio"	Mark Helfrich	...Earth to the Dandy Warhols...
2008	"Now You Love Me"	Mike Bruce	...Earth to the Dandy Warhols...
2008	"The Legend of the Last of the Outlaw Truckers"	Mike Bruce	...Earth to the Dandy Warhols...
2008	"Mission Control"	Mike Bruce	...Earth to the Dandy Warhols...
2008	"The World Come On"	Mike Bruce	...Earth to the Dandy Warhols...
2009	"And Then I Dreamt of Yes"	Mark Helfrich	...Earth to the Dandy Warhols...
2010	"This Is the Tide"		The Capitol Years 1995–2007
2010	"This Is the Tide" (alternate version 1)	Justin Adams	The Capitol Years 1995–2007
2010	"This Is the Tide" (alternate version 2)	Joe Kaczmarek	The Capitol Years 1995–2007
2012	"Sad Vacation"	Arthur Bradford	This Machine
2012	"Alternative Power to the People"		This Machine
2012	"The Autumn Carnival"	Thomas Rhazi	This Machine
2013	"Rest Your Head"	Jean-Franois Rivard	This Machine
2016	"You Are Killing Me"	Mark Helfrich	Distortland
2016	"Semper Fidelis"	Virginia Gilles	Distortland
2016	"Catcher in the Rye"	Mike Bruce	Distortland
2018	"Forever"	Arnold Pander	Why You So Crazy
2018	"Be Alright"	Courtney Taylor-Taylor	Why You So Crazy
2019	"Motor City Steel"	Patrick Proctor	Why You So Crazy
2020	"Next Thing I Know"	Chris Bergstrom	Why You So Crazy
2023	"The Summer of Hate"	Justin Lowe	Rockmaker
2024	"I'd Like to Help You with Your Problem"	Andy Link	Rockmaker
2024	"Teutonic Wine"	Justin Lowe	Rockmaker
2025	"Love Thyself"	Justin Lowe	Rockmaker
