= The Black Album/Come On Feel The Dandy Warhols =

The Black Album / Come On Feel The Dandy Warhols
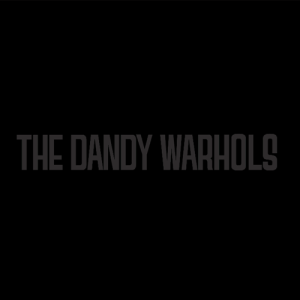

Studio album / compilation album by The Dandy Warhols
- Released: April 20, 2004
- Recorded: 1995–2003
- Genre: Rock
- Length: 120:07
- Labels: Beat the World; CD-001A
- Producer: Courtney Taylor-Taylor

The Dandy Warhols chronology
| Welcome to the Monkey House (2003) | The Black Album / Come On Feel The Dandy Warhols (2004) | Odditorium or Warlords of Mars (2005) |

The Black Album / Come On Feel The Dandy Warhols is a 2004 double album released by American alternative band, The Dandy Warhols. The two-disc set was released on their own Beat the World Records label. Initially, the album was only available to purchase through the band's website. It is now available to own via other sources.

== Overview ==
Disc one marks the first, official release of the band's 1996 demo album (The Black Album) which was described as "lost". The album, recorded before ...The Dandy Warhols Come Down, was rejected by Capitol Records and dismissed by the band themselves. Three songs that were included on the original recording of the album are not included on this release, namely: "Traci Lords", "Alien" and "You Get High".

The second disc (Come On Feel The Dandy Warhols) is the first compilation album released by the band. It contains B-sides, covers, and previously unreleased material. Glide Magazine stated that the cover of Crosby, Stills, Nash and Young's "Ohio" used "droning synthesizers" to produce an "alt/psychedelia sound."

== Track listing ==
All tracks are written by Courtney Taylor-Taylor, unless otherwise noted.

The Black Album
| No. | Title | Writer(s) | Length |
|---|---|---|---|
| 1. | "Arpeggio Adaggio" | | 4:15 |
| 2. | "Crack Cocaine Rager" | | 3:07 |
| 3. | "Good Morning" | | 3:44 |
| 4. | "Head" | | 3:11 |
| 5. | "White Gold" | | 4:04 |
| 6. | "Boys" | | 4:10 |
| 7. | "Shiny Leather Boots" | Zia McCabe & Taylor-Taylor | 4:25 |
| 8. | "Earth to the Dandy Warhols" | | 3:02 |
| 9. | "Minnesoter" | | 3:31 |
| 10. | "Twist" | | 4:26 |
| 11. | "The Wreck" (Gordon Lightfoot cover) | Gordon Lightfoot | 9:08 |
| Total length: | | | 47:05 |

Come On Feel The Dandy Warhols
| No. | Title | Writer(s) | Length |
|---|---|---|---|
| 1. | "Not If You Were the Last Junkie in Tony's Basement" | | 3:12 |
| 2. | "Retarded" | | 2:46 |
| 3. | "Free-for-All" (Ted Nugent cover) | Ted Nugent | 2:13 |
| 4. | "Dub Song" | | 6:31 |
| 5. | "Call Me" (Blondie cover) | Deborah Harry & Giorgio Moroder | 3:31 |
| 6. | "Relax" (Frankie Goes to Hollywood cover) | Peter Gill, Holly Johnson & Mark O'Toole | 3:49 |
| 7. | "Head" | | 3:17 |
| 8. | "Thanks for the Show" | | 2:55 |
| 9. | "Lance" | | 2:50 |
| 10. | "Ohio" (Crosby, Stills, Nash & Young cover) | Neil Young | 4:39 |
| 11. | "One Saved Message" | | 3:55 |
| 12. | "Hells Bells" (AC/DC cover) | Brian Johnson, Angus Young & Malcolm Young | 5:58 |
| 13. | "The Jean Genie" (David Bowie cover) | David Bowie | 2:14 |
| 14. | "Stars" (The Brian Jonestown Massacre cover) | Anton Newcombe | 4:26 |
| 15. | "Dick" | | 5:11 |
| 16. | "One Ultra Lame Whiteboy" | Peter Holmström & Taylor-Taylor | 3:11 |
| 17. | "We Love You Dick" | | 7:02 |
| 18. | "The Wreck of the Edmund Fitzgerald" (Gordon Lightfoot cover) | Gordon Lightfoot | 4:57 |
| Total length: | | | 1:13:02 |

=== Track info ===
(Sources:)

- The song "Boys" was later released as "Boys Better".
- Early versions of the song "Earth to the Dandy Warhols" had been known as "E Jams" and/or "Part 1".
- The song "Not If You Were the Last Junkie in Tony's Basement" is a Tony Lash remix of the song "Not If You Were the Last Junkie on Earth", and was formally released as "Not If You Were the Last Junkie on Earth (Tony's Basement Mix)".
- The song "Thanks for the Show" was formally released as "Kinky".
- Neil Young's first name is misspelled as "Niel" in the liner notes.
- The song "One Saved Message" was formally released as "Phone Call".
- The song "One Ultra Lame White Boy" was formally released as "One (Ultra Lame White Boy)".

== Personnel ==
The Dandy Warhols

- Disc one:
  - Courtney Taylor-Taylor – vocals, guitars, keyboards
  - Zia McCabe – keyboards, bass
  - Peter Holmström – guitars
  - Eric Hedford – drums
- Disc two:
  - Courtney Taylor-Taylor – vocals, guitar, keyboards, percussion
  - Peter Holmström – guitars, vocals
  - Zia McCabe – keyboards, bass, vocals
  - Brent DeBoer – drums, guitars, vocals
  - Eric Hedford – drums, vocal harmonies (1, 7, 15–18)
- Album design and layout by Sean Gothman and Courtney Taylor-Taylor
