= Tafelmuzik Means More When You're Alone =

Studio album by the Dandy Warhols
- Released: April 1, 2020
- Recorded: 2010
- Studio: The Odditorium (Portland, Oregon)
- Genre: Experimental; psychedelia; ambient
- Length: 214:30
- Label: Dine Alone
- Producer: Jake Portrait

The Dandy Warhols chronology
Why You So Crazy (2019)	Tafelmuzik Means More When You're Alone (2020)	Rockmaker (2024)

Professional ratings
Review scores
Source	Rating
The AU Review	2.5/5 stars
HiFi Way	3.5/5 stars
Vinyl District	D+

Tafelmuzik Means More When You're Alone is the eleventh studio album by American alternative rock band the Dandy Warhols, self-released on April 1, 2020.

Released during the onset of the COVID-19 pandemic, the album consists of recordings from 2010 in-between sessions for This Machine and ...Earth to the Dandy Warhols.... Clocking in at a little over three-and-a-half hours, Tafelmuzik is the band's longest album to date.

== Track listing ==
All music is composed by Courtney Taylor-Taylor, Peter Holmström, Zia McCabe, and Brent DeBoer.

Tafelmuzik Means More When You're Alone track listing
No.	Title	Length
1.	"It's the End of the World as We Know It and I Feel Bored"	36:43
2.	"Mind Yer Mind"	28:12
3.	"Have a Smoke, It Could Be Your Last"	26:36
4.	"10mg Edible"	9:25
5.	"Hot Vegetable"	22:19
6.	"Day Off"	30:14
7.	"Another Day Off"	30:35
8.	"Arts & Crafts"	15:12
9.	"Zia Rolls Another"	7:50
10.	"The After Bath"	7:24
Total length:		214:30
