= Every Day Should Be a Holiday =

1997 single by The Dandy Warhols

Single by The Dandy Warhols

from the album ...The Dandy Warhols Come Down
- Released: 15 July 1997
- Length: 4:01
- Label: Capitol
- Songwriter: Courtney Taylor-Taylor
- Producers: Tony Lash, Eric Hedford, Courtney Taylor-Taylor

The Dandy Warhols singles chronology
"Not If You Were the Last Junkie on Earth" (1997)	"Every Day Should Be a Holiday" (1997)	"Boys Better" (1998)

"Every Day Should Be a Holiday" is a song by American alternative rock band The Dandy Warhols. It was released in 1997 as the first single from their second studio album, ...The Dandy Warhols Come Down. The song was featured in the movie There's Something About Mary and included in the official soundtrack album. Considered one of their most commercially successful tracks and a "classic" of their repertoire, it peaked at #29 on the UK Singles Chart. The song has also been included in the compilation album The Capitol Years 1995–2007.

== Personnel ==
- Courtney Taylor-Taylor - vocals, guitar
- Peter Holmstrom - guitar
- Zia McCabe - bass
- Eric Hedford - drums

== Track listing ==
All tracks are written by Courtney Taylor-Taylor.

Original 1997 release
No.	Title	Length
1.	"Every Day Should Be a Holiday"	4:02
2.	"One (Ultra Lame White Boy)"	3:11
3.	"Head"	3:17

1998 version
No.	Title	Length
1.	"Every Day Should Be a Holiday"	4:03
2.	"Ride" (live)	4:43
3.	"It's a Fast Drivin' Rave Up with the Dandy Warhols Sixteen Minutes" (live)	7:18
4.	"Genius" (live)	7:03

== Charts ==
Chart performance
Chart (1998)	Peak position
UK Singles (OCC)	29
