= The Capitol Years 1995–2007 =

Compilation album by the Dandy Warhols
- Released: July 19, 2010
- Recorded: 1995–2007
- Label: Capitol
- Producer: Courtney Taylor-Taylor

The Dandy Warhols chronology
The Dandy Warhols Are Sound (2009)	The Capitol Years 1995–2007 (2010)	This Machine (2012)

Professional ratings
Review scores
Source	Rating
AllMusic	4/5 stars
BBC Online	mixed
Drowned in Sound	5/10
The Phoenix	2.5/4 stars
Pitchfork	5.0/10
PopMatters	7/10
Slant Magazine	3.5/5 stars

The Capitol Years 1995–2007 (also released as The Best of the Capitol Years 1995–2007) is a greatest hits album by American alternative rock band the Dandy Warhols. It was released in the UK on July 19, 2010, and in the United States on August 24, 2010. It comprises their years with Capitol Records, before the band left the label and started their own, Beat the World. It also features one original composition, "This Is the Tide," for which three different music videos were produced.

== Track listing ==
All tracks are written by Courtney Taylor-Taylor, except where noted

No.	Title	Writer(s)	Length
1.	"Boys Better"		4:32
2.	"Every Day Should Be a Holiday (Tony Lash Mix)" (previously unreleased mix)		3:53
3.	"Not If You Were the Last Junkie on Earth"		3:12
4.	"Good Morning"		4:59
5.	"Godless (Extended Outro)" (previously unreleased edit)		5:41
6.	"Get Off"		3:10
7.	"Bohemian Like You"		3:31
8.	"We Used to Be Friends"	Taylor-Taylor, Grant Nicholas, Bjorn Thorsrud	3:19
9.	"Scientist (Are Sound Version)"		3:13
10.	"The Last High (Edit)" (previously unreleased edit)	Taylor-Taylor, Evan Dando	4:35
11.	"Plan A (Are Sound Version)"		4:59
12.	"Holding Me Up"		7:15
13.	"All the Money or the Simple Life Honey"	Taylor-Taylor, Miles Zuniga	4:29
14.	"Smoke It"	Taylor-Taylor, Zuniga	4:06
15.	"This Is the Tide" (previously unreleased)	Brent DeBoer, Zia McCabe	5:03

== Release history ==
Region	Date
Australia	July 9, 2010
Worldwide	July 19, 2010
United States	August 24, 2010
