= This Machine (album) =

Studio album by The Dandy Warhols
- Released: April 24, 2012
- Recorded: May–November 2011
- Length: 43:02
- Label: Beat the World; The End
- Producer: The Dandy Warhols; Jeremy Sherrer

The Dandy Warhols chronology
The Capitol Years 1995–2007 (2010)	This Machine (2012)	Distortland (2016)

Singles from This Machine
- 1. "Well They're Gone" Released: March 1, 2012

This Machine is the eighth studio album by American rock band The Dandy Warhols. It was released on April 24, 2012, by record label The End. The album features a more stripped-down, laid-back style than much of the band's previous work.

== Background and recording ==
While playing at Sydney's Enmore Theatre in May 2011 as part of their 2011 Australian tour, lead singer Courtney Taylor-Taylor announced the new album would be titled This Machine and is to be released in February 2012 (Taylor-Taylor had previously jokingly announced it as The Pastor of Muppets, Shitty Shitty Band Band or Whirled Piece in blog posts on the band's official website). On the same tour, the band debuted two new songs which would later appear on the album, "Seti vs. the Wow! Signal" and "Rest Your Head".

This Machine was recorded between May and November 2011.

The band collaborated with ex-Bauhaus member David J on the track "The Autumn Carnival"; J co-wrote the song and supplied backing vocals and bass guitar to the track.

== Release ==
The band announced the release of the album's first single, "Well They're Gone", on their website on March 1, 2012, allowing visitors to download the track for free after entering their email address. A music video for the track "Sad Vacation" was released to YouTube on April 20.

This Machine was released on April 24, 2012.

== Critical reception ==
Professional ratings
Aggregate scores
Source	Rating
Metacritic	50/100
Review scores
Source	Rating
AllMusic	4/5 stars
The A.V. Club	D
Robert Christgau	(2-star Honorable Mention)
Classic Rock	7/10 stars
Consequence of Sound	3/5 stars
Pitchfork	5.1/10
PopMatters	4/10

The album has received a mixed response from critics. Benjamin Aspray of PopMatters wrote "Like reformed alcoholics who were more fun when they drank, This Machine is alternately sullen and unconvincingly earnest, and inoffensive to a fault. [...] As the appropriately titled The Dandy Warhols Are Sound—the pre-Nick Rhodes version of Welcome to the Monkey House—made abundantly clear, a stripping down does not become them. They're an object lesson in self-conscious style as substance, and that's the fun of it!" Pitchfork gave it a 5.1/10 grade, their highest rating for a Dandy Warhols since 1997's ...The Dandy Warhols Come Down, calling it "the most sober Dandy Warhols album to date, reining in the stoner rock sprawl, the curled-lip snark and bad puns endemic to so many Dandys releases", but "an all-too-fitting descriptor of a band going through the motions", commenting that frontman Courtney Taylor-Taylor "just sounds bored". The A.V. Club called it "an undistinguished slog of an album".

AllMusic, on the other hand, gave it a positive review, writing "It's the closest the band has come yet to something genuinely uplifting and irony-free – no small feat for these tongue-in-cheek provocateurs, but This Machine suggests that the Dandy Warhols are actually improving with age, which is an even bigger accomplishment." Stephen Dalton in his review for the magazine Classic Rock writes that the band sounds "refreshed and rebooted" and the album "is possibly their best yet", despite ultimately being "a triumph of inventive arrangements and lush production over songwriting."

== Track listing ==
No.	Title	Writer(s)	Length
1.	"Sad Vacation"	Brent DeBoer, Courtney Taylor-Taylor	4:27
2.	"The Autumn Carnival"	Taylor-Taylor, David J	4:00
3.	"Enjoy Yourself"	Taylor-Taylor	3:01
4.	"Alternative Power to the People"	DeBoer, Taylor-Taylor	2:45
5.	"Well They're Gone"	Taylor-Taylor	4:15
6.	"Rest Your Head"	Taylor-Taylor, Miles Zuniga	4:12
7.	"16 Tons" (Merle Travis cover)	Merle Travis	2:08
8.	"I Am Free"	Taylor-Taylor	4:07
9.	"Seti vs. the Wow! Signal"	Taylor-Taylor	3:17
10.	"Don't Shoot She Cried"	DeBoer, Zia McCabe	5:53
11.	"Slide"	DeBoer	4:57

iTunes bonus track
No.	Title	Writer(s)	Length
12.	"Kiss Off" (Violent Femmes cover)	Gordon Gano	2:51

== Personnel ==
The Dandy Warhols

- Courtney Taylor-Taylor – vocals and electric guitar
- Peter Holmström – electric guitar and backing vocals
- Zia McCabe – keyboards
- Brent DeBoer – drums, percussion and backing vocals

Additional personnel

- David J – backing vocals and bass guitar on "The Autumn Carnival"
- Steve Berlin – baritone saxophone on "16 Tons"
- Kat Gardiner – Theremin on "Well They're Gone"
- Daniel Lamb – trombone on "I Am Free"
- Katie Presley – trumpet on "I Am Free"
- Taylor Aglipay – tenor saxophone on "I Am Free"

Technical

- Tchad Blake – mixing
- Jeremy Sherrer – engineering at The Odditorium
- Tim Johnston – Drums, backing vocals recorded at Coloursound Recording Studio, Melbourne, Australia)
- Mat Robins – engineering
- Adam Ayan – mastering at Gateway Mastering, Portland, Maine
- Sean Gothman – album design and layout
- Hickory Mertasching – album cover painting
- Dan Kivitka – album cover photography
- Steve Birch – additional album cover production
- Elliot Lee Hazel – sleeve band portraits

== Charts ==
Chart performance for This Machine
Chart (2012)	Peak position
Australian Albums (ARIA)	97
Belgian Albums (Ultratop Flanders)	172
Belgian Albums (Ultratop Wallonia)	33
Dutch Albums (Album Top 100)	99
French Albums (SNEP)	68
Swiss Albums (Schweizer Hitparade)	65
UK Independent Albums (OCC)	41
US Billboard 200	88
