= Pete International Airport (album) =

Studio album by Pete International Airport
- Released: 15 September 2010
- Genre: Neo-psychedelia
- Length: 54:39
- Label: Custom Made

Pete International Airport is the self-titled debut studio album by American neo-psychedelia band Pete International Airport. It was released on 15 September 2010 by record label Custom Made Music.

== Background ==
On the making of the album, Holmström states:

I started coming up with some of the songs back in '97; I just never found the right place for them [...] Some of them didn't work with the band's views and other ones, I started another band to try to do the songs and that didn't work out. So I just ended up doing them on my own, which is something I needed to do as I was growing as a musician and a songwriter.

== Reception ==
Professional ratings
Review scores
Source	Rating
AllMusic	3.5/5 stars
Consequence of Sound	3.5/5 stars
The Oregonian	B

The album received mixed-to-favorable reviews. Consequence of Sound called the album "a very mellow, bizarre and sure-to-be-discussed fall album", writing that "their weird brand of indie will certainly strike a chord with the crowd that has been building up decade after decade". AllMusic's review was favorable, writing that it "brings back the druggy joys of the younger Dandys [The Dandy Warhols] circa Dandys Rule OK? and Come Down".

== Track listing ==
No.	Title	Length
1.	"Sweetheart Tattoo"	1:57
2.	"21 Days"	5:17
3.	"Beatle Boots & Battle Scars"	5:23
4.	"Mark Twain Shoe Shine"	3:29
5.	"Starlight"	6:18
6.	"New Eastern"	6:13
7.	"Hispanic Bee"	1:21
8.	"Repeater"	7:17
9.	"Idioms for Dummies"	2:48
10.	"George the 2nd"	3:42
11.	"I Care"	10:54
