= Rockmaker =

Studio album by the Dandy Warhols
- Released: March 15, 2024
- Studio: The Odditorium (Portland); Air Traffic Control (Portland)
- Genre: Alternative rock
- Length: 41:17
- Label: Sunset Blvd; Beat the World
- Producer: Peter Holmström; Courtney Taylor-Taylor

The Dandy Warhols chronology
Tafelmuzik Means More When You're Alone (2020)	Rockmaker (2024)	Pin Ups (2026)

Singles from Rockmaker
- 1. "The Summer of Hate" Released: October 13, 2023; 2. "Danzig With Myself" Released: January 16, 2024; 3. "I'd Like to Help You with Your Problem" Released: February 14, 2024

Rockmaker is the twelfth studio album by American alternative rock band the Dandy Warhols, released through Sunset Blvd Records and Beat the World on March 15, 2024. It marks their return to rock music after the over three-hour-long experimental album Tafelmuzik Means More When You're Alone (2020). The album includes guest appearances from Frank Black, Slash, and Debbie Harry. It received positive reviews from critics.

== Critical reception ==
Professional ratings
Aggregate scores
Source	Rating
Metacritic	66/100
Review scores
Source	Rating
Clash	7/10
MusicOMH	4/5 stars
Sputnikmusic	3.4/5
Uncut	7/10

Rockmaker has a score of 66 out of 100 on review aggregator Metacritic based on seven critics' reviews, indicating "generally favorable" reception. Uncut commented that "Rockmaker's rude vigour and bounty of hooks will reassure the faithful, as should the ample supply of snark from Courtney Taylor-Taylor". Reviewing the album for Clash, Susan Hansen wrote that the album "does not dishearten. Rockmaker is heavy yet melodic, making use of wah-wah guitar pedalling and overriding fuzz, a mind unwaveringly set on hippy psych".

Raul Stanciu of Sputnikmusic felt that Rockmaker "breathes new life into the machine. Somehow it feels like a cold shower, displaying a considerable dose of cynicism amid meatier hooks" and that the band "seemed more eager to develop the songs rather than creating a mood with minimal contributions and letting it brood". John Murphy of MusicOMH remarked that "while there are no big surprises [...] most of the tracks on the album are as instantly addictive as in their heyday", concluding that "although they may never re-create their '90s heyday, still know how to rock with the best of them".

== Track listing ==
Rockmaker track listing
No.	Title	Writer(s)	Length
1.	"Doomsday Bells"	Peter Holmström; Courtney Taylor-Taylor	3:08
2.	"Danzig with Myself" (featuring Black Francis)	Taylor-Taylor	3:55
3.	"Teutonic Wine"	Taylor-Taylor	3:16
4.	"The Summer of Hate"	Holmström; Taylor-Taylor	3:18
5.	"I'd Like to Help You with Your Problem" (featuring Slash)	Brent DeBoer; Taylor-Taylor; Adam Flick	4:18
6.	"The Cross"	Holmström; Taylor-Taylor	3:44
7.	"Root of All Evil"	Holmström; Taylor-Taylor	3:49
8.	"Alcohol and Cocainemarijuananicotine"	Holmström; Taylor-Taylor	4:05
9.	"Love Thyself"	DeBoer; Taylor-Taylor	3:06
10.	"Real People"	Holmström; Taylor-Taylor	2:52
11.	"I Will Never Stop Loving You" (featuring Debbie Harry)	Holmström; Taylor-Taylor	5:45
Total length:			41:17

== Personnel ==
The Dandy Warhols

- Courtney Taylor-Taylor – performance, production, cover design
- Peter Holmström – performance, production, engineering
- Zia McCabe – performance
- Brent DeBoer – performance

Additional musicians

- Black Francis – additional guitar on "Danzig with Myself" and "Love Thyself"
- Gina Noelle – additional vocals on "The Summer of Hate"
- James Mercer – backing vocals on "I'd Like to Help You with Your Problem"
- Slash – additional guitar on "I'd Like to Help You with Your Problem"
- Pat Spurgeon – drums on "Alcohol and Cocainemarijuananicotine" and "I Will Never Stop Loving You"
- Cory Gray – trumpets on "Real People", piano on "I Will Never Stop Loving You"
- Debbie Harry – vocals on "I Will Never Stop Loving You"
- Louise Woodward – strings on "I Will Never Stop Loving You"

Technical

- Keith Tenniswood – mastering
- Jagz Kooner – mixing
- Chris Thompson – engineering
- Brandon Eggleston – engineering

Visuals

- Elliott Erwitt – cover photography
- Sean Gothman – album design, layout
- Steve Birch – back cover logo
- Servo – back cover logo

== Charts ==
Chart performance for Rockmaker
Chart (2024)	Peak position
Scottish Albums (OCC)	76
UK Album Downloads (OCC)	56
UK Independent Albums (OCC)	22
