= Dandys Rule OK =

Studio album by the Dandy Warhols
- Released: 6 April 1995
- Recorded: 1994–1995
- Genre: Shoegaze
- Length: 74:02
- Label: Tim/Kerr
- Producer: Courtney Taylor-Taylor; Tony Lash

The Dandy Warhols chronology
Dandys Rule OK (1995)	...The Dandy Warhols Come Down (1997)

Singles from Dandys Rule OK
- 1. "Ride" Released: 1995; 2. "The Dandy Warhols T.V. Theme Song" Released: 1995; 3. "Nothin' to Do" Released: 1996

Dandys Rule OK is the debut studio album by American alternative rock band the Dandy Warhols, recorded from 1994 to 1995 and released on 6 April 1995 by Tim/Kerr Records.

Three singles were released from the album: "Ride", "The Dandy Warhols T.V. Theme Song" and "Nothin' to Do".

== Background ==
The album is sometimes referred to as The White Album, in reference to the album cover which bears similarities to The Beatles' self-titled album (which is also known as The White Album), in contrast to the band's The Black Album, recorded the following year in 1996 but not released until 2004.

== Release ==
Three singles were released from the album: "Ride", "The Dandy Warhols T.V. Theme Song" and "Nothin' to Do". "T.V. Theme Song" aired on several radio stations and appeared on MTV.

== Reception ==
Professional ratings
Review scores
Source	Rating
AllMusic	3/5 stars
Alternative Press	favorable
NME	4/10
Q	2/5 stars
Select	2/5 medals
Trouser Press	unfavorable
The Washington Post	mixed

The album has received a mixed reception from critics. Q magazine wrote that it's "what the Portland quartet sound like on bad drugs". NME also gave it a negative review, calling it an "unfocused, sprawling debut album, notable for the piledriving classic 'TV Theme Song', an awful lot of stoned noodling and pretty much sod-all else."

== Track listing ==
All tracks are written by Courtney Taylor-Taylor, except where noted.

No.	Title	Writer(s)	Length
1.	"Introduction by Young Tom"		0:26
2.	"The Dandy Warhols' T.V. Theme Song"		2:50
3.	"Ride"		4:10
4.	"Best Friend"		3:27
5.	"Not Your Bottle"		4:00
6.	"(Tony, This Song Is Called) Lou Weed"		4:17
7.	"Nothin' to Do"		2:23
8.	"The Coffee and Tea Wrecks"		4:06
9.	"Genius"		6:08
10.	"Dick"		8:07
11.	"Just Try"		4:41
12.	"Nothing (Lifestyle of a Tortured Artist for Sale)"		3:52
13.	"Grunge Betty"		3:32
14.	"Prelude: It's A Fast-Driving Rave-Up With the Dandy Warhols Sixteen Minutes"	Taylor-Taylor, Peter Holmström, Eric Hedford	0:51
15.	"It's A Fast-Driving Rave-Up With the Dandy Warhols Sixteen Minutes"	Taylor-Taylor, Holmström, Hedford	16:04
16.	"Finale: It's A Fast-Driving Rave-Up With the Dandy Warhols Sixteen Minutes"	Taylor-Taylor, Holmström, Hedford	4:58

A hidden track starts at 3:11 into "Finale: It's a Fast Driving Rave-Up with The Dandy Warhols". It is a short reprise of "Dick".

== Personnel ==
=== The Dandy Warhols ===
- Courtney Taylor-Taylor – guitar, vocals, production, sleeve design and layout
- Zia McCabe – keyboards and percussion
- Peter Holmström – guitar
- Eric Hedford – drums, vocals and synthesizer

=== Additional personnel ===
- Zedekiah Pariah – Jew's harp on "Grunge Betty" and lap steel guitar and harmonica on "Just Try"
- Derek Ecklund – sitar on "Dick"
- Julianne Johnson – vocals on "Just Try"
- Tony Lash – percussion and production
- Tim Rooney – congas on "The Coffee and Tea Wrecks"
- Teddy Deane – flute on "(Tony, This Song Is Called) Lou Weed"
- Dave Kinhan – album artwork painting
- Tony Lash – engineering, mastering and production
- Marc Trunz – sleeve photography
- Steven Birch – album design
