= The Great Northwest =

The Great Northwest (previously The Every Thing) is a neo-psychedelic project created by studio engineer and producer Brian J. Coates. The group is based around a collective philosophy in which "every one is welcome to participate". Their debut album was recorded in Fresno, California and Portland, Oregon in 2006 and was released in 2008.

The group went on their first East Coast tour in late 2006 playing the CMJ festival in New York City (with guest drummer Courtney Taylor-Taylor) and the Millennium Stage at the Kennedy Center in Washington, D.C. The group toured again in 2008 in support of Dead Meadow before releasing their debut album "The Widespread Reign of The Great Northwest" on The Kora Records in 2008.

== Past and present band members ==
- Brian Coates
- Randall Crush
- Josh Kalberg
- RJ Okay
- Andy Olmstead
- Joe Kaczmarek
- Caleb Spiegel
- Peter Holmström
- Brent Fellows
- Jeff Baldwin
- Mike Faith
- Marty Smith
- Dale Winston
- Geoffrey Cecil
- Noah Rice
- Nathan Rice
