= Why You So Crazy =

Studio album by The Dandy Warhols
- Released: January 25, 2019
- Studio: The Odditorium (Portland, Oregon)
- Length: 40:49
- Label: Dine Alone

The Dandy Warhols chronology
Distortland (2016)	Why You So Crazy (2019)	Tafelmuzik Means More When You're Alone (2020)

Professional ratings
Aggregate scores
Source	Rating
Metacritic	56/100
Review scores
Source	Rating
AllMusic	2.5/5 stars
Clash	5/10
Paste	7.3/10
PopMatters	6/10
Under the Radar	5/10

Why You So Crazy is the tenth studio album by American alternative rock band The Dandy Warhols, released on January 25, 2019, through Dine Alone Records. It was supported by the single "Be Alright", for which a 360° video was made starring actress Jessica Paré, and was promoted by a 2019 tour.

== Music ==
The album has been noted as a "return" to the band's "freewheeling" style, containing "references as far flung as Fred Astaire and Ginger Rogers, Don McLean's Chevy, and the church of Bowie's 'Modern Love'." The songs have been called "off-kilter psych-pop", "high country-fried Americana" to "gothic piano-propelled rumba".

The album also features increased songwriting output from keyboardist Zia McCabe and drummer Brent DeBoer, who have credits on nearly half the album's tracks.

== Singles ==
While the band initially previewed the song "Forever", "Be Alright" was chosen as the lead single. It was accompanied by a 360° video conceived by Kevin Moyer and directed by frontman Courtney Taylor-Taylor. Moyer claimed he was inspired to make the video at the band's headquarters, the Odditorium, located in Portland, which he described as making "your head spin trying to take all of it in as you walk through the unique rock [and] roll space". The video is about the effects of drinking a "magic wine", and stars actress Jessica Paré.

== Track listing ==
No.	Title	Writer(s)	Length
1.	"Fred 'n' Ginger"	Courtney Taylor-Taylor	0:41
2.	"Terraform"	Taylor-Taylor	3:18
3.	"Highlife"	Zia McCabe	2:32
4.	"Be Alright"	Brent DeBoer	3:49
5.	"Thee Elegant Bum"	Taylor-Taylor	2:28
6.	"Sins Are Forgiven"	Taylor-Taylor	2:26
7.	"Next Thing I Know"	DeBoer, Taylor-Taylor	4:38
8.	"Small Town Girls"	Taylor-Taylor	2:38
9.	"To the Church"	DeBoer	4:05
10.	"Motor City Steel"	Taylor-Taylor	3:07
11.	"Forever"	DeBoer, Taylor-Taylor	4:43
12.	"Ondine"	Maurice Ravel	6:24
Total length:			40:49

== Charts ==
Chart (2019)	Peak position
French Albums (SNEP)	136
