= ...Earth to the Dandy Warhols... =

Studio album by The Dandy Warhols
- Released: May 5, 2008
- Recorded: 2008
- Genre: Neo-psychedelia
- Length: 69:15
- Label: Beat the World
- Producer: Courtney Taylor-Taylor

The Dandy Warhols chronology
Odditorium or Warlords of Mars (2005)	...Earth to the Dandy Warhols... (2008)	The Dandy Warhols Are Sound (2009)

Singles from ...Earth to the Dandy Warhols...
- 1. "Mission Control" Released: June 28, 2008

...Earth to the Dandy Warhols... is the sixth studio album by American rock band The Dandy Warhols. It was recorded in 2008 and released on May 19, 2008, the first album released on their self-founded Beat the World Records label after leaving Capitol Records in 2007.

Music critics were largely unappreciative of the album. "Mission Control" was released as the album's sole single on June 28.

== Release ==
...Earth to the Dandy Warhols... was released for download and streaming play on May 19, 2008, with the CD version of the album following on August 18. It is their first release on their self-founded Beat the World Records label, after leaving Capitol Records in 2007.

"Mission Control" was released as the sole single from the album on June 28. Music videos for all songs except "Wasp in the Lotus", "Love Song", "Beast of All Saints", "Valerie Yum" and "Musee du Nougat" were released.

== Reception ==
Professional ratings
Aggregate scores
Source	Rating
Metacritic	46/100
Review scores
Source	Rating
AllMusic	3.5/5 stars
The A.V. Club	C−
Blender	2/5 stars
The Guardian	1/5 stars
Mojo	2/5 stars
Pitchfork	3.5/10
PopMatters	3/10
Slant Magazine	3/5 stars
Spin	5/10
Uncut	4/10

The album received a generally negative response from critics. While Robert Christgau gave it a two-star rating, signifying an "Honorable Mention", and AllMusic called it "a giant leap in the right direction" after the "uneven" Odditorium or Warlords of Mars, The Guardian calling it "achingly dull".

== Track listing ==
All tracks are written by Courtney Taylor-Taylor, except where noted.

No.	Title	Writer(s)	Length
1.	"The World Come On" (also known as "The World The People Together (Come On)")	Taylor-Taylor, Peter Holmström	4:42
2.	"Mission Control"		2:16
3.	"Welcome to the Third World"		5:50
4.	"Wasp in the Lotus"		4:36
5.	"And Then I Dreamt of Yes"		4:42
6.	"Talk Radio"		5:28
7.	"Love Song" (featuring Mark Knopfler and Mike Campbell)	Taylor-Taylor, Graham Goble	3:48
8.	"Now You Love Me"		3:09
9.	"Mis Amigos"		4:31
10.	"The Legend of the Last of the Outlaw Truckers AKA the Ballad of Sheriff Shorty"		3:44
11.	"Beast of All Saints"		4:47
12.	"Valerie Yum"	Taylor-Taylor, Rozz Rezabek	7:01
13.	"Musee D'Nougat"		14:46

iTunes bonus tracks
No.	Title	Writer(s)	Length
14.	"Sister Golden Hair" (America cover)	Gerry Beckley	3:45

== Personnel ==
The Dandy Warhols

- Courtney Taylor-Taylor – vocals, guitar and mixing (on "The Legend of the Last of the Outlaw Truckers")
- Peter Holmström – guitar
- Zia McCabe – keyboards
- Brent DeBoer – drums and backing vocals

Additional personnel

- Greg Gordon – engineering and mixing
- Jeremy Sherrer – engineering
- Jacob Martin Portrait – mixing
- Steve Marcusson – mastering

== Charts ==
Chart (2008)	Peak position
Australian Albums (ARIA)	25
Belgian Albums (Ultratop Wallonia)	51
French Albums (SNEP)	107
New Zealand Albums (RMNZ)	37
UK Albums (OCC)	149
US Billboard 200	128
