= Chris Anthony =

Chris Anthony may refer to:

- Chris Anthony (American football), Arena Football League wide receiver/linebacker
- Chris Anthony (artist), Swedish artist
- Chris Anthony (rugby union) (born 1976), former international Wales rugby union player
- Chris Anthony (voice actress) (born 1957), American voice actress
