= Pete International Airport =

American band

- From left to right: Jsun Adams, Jason "Plucky" Anchondo, Peter Holmström, Collin Hegna and Paulie Pulvirenti

Background information
- Origin: Portland, Oregon, United States
- Genre: Neo-psychedelia
- Years active: 1997–present
- Label: A Recordings
- Members: Peter Holmström; Daniel Sparks; Chuck Davis; Jason Sebastian Russo
- Past members: Jsun Adams; Collin Hegna; Jason "Plucky" Anchondo; Paulie Pulvirenti
- Website: www.peteinternationalairport.com

Pete International Airport is an American neo-psychedelia band from Portland, Oregon, formed in 1997 by Peter Holmström of The Dandy Warhols. Original line-up includes Jsun Adams (The Upsidedown) on vocals, Collin Hegna (The Brian Jonestown Massacre) on bass guitar, Jason "El Firme Plucky" Anchondo (The Warlocks, Spindrift) on drums and Paulie Pulvirenti, also on drums.

In 2010 they released their debut self-titled album. Music videos were produced for three of the album's tracks, including "21 Days", which premiered on Spinner.com on 7 September 2010.

Pete International Airport's second album, Safer With The Wolves…, was called a "meticulously crafted psyche rock journey into the dark heart of electronica". The album's 11 tracks feature guest singers from The Black Angels, Daydream Machine, Black Rebel Motorcycle Club, Dark Horses, Hopewell, and more. It was released by Anton Newcombe's (The Brian Jonestown Massacre) A Recordings in October 2017. Produced and Engineered by Peter G. Holmström. Mixed by Jeremy Sherrer at Spooky Electric Co. Mastered by Dave Cooley at Elysian Masters.

Current live band consists of long-time collaborator Daniel Sparks, plus Chuck Davis and Jason Sebastian Russo of Guiding Light/Hopewell.

== Discography ==
- Pete International Airport (2010)
- Safer With The Wolves... (2017)
- SFR WTH TH WLVS...RMX (2019)
- It Felt Like the End of the World (2023)
