= Not If You Were the Last Junkie on Earth =

1997 single by the Dandy Warhols

Single by the Dandy Warhols

from the album ...The Dandy Warhols Come Down
- Released: June 16, 1997
- Genre: Alternative rock; psychedelic pop
- Length: 3:11
- Label: Capitol; Tim/Kerr
- Songwriter: Courtney Taylor-Taylor
- Producers: Tony Lash; Courtney Taylor-Taylor

The Dandy Warhols singles chronology
"Nothin' to Do" (1996)	"Not If You Were the Last Junkie on Earth" (1997)	"Every Day Should Be a Holiday" (1997)

"Not If You Were the Last Junkie on Earth" is a song by American rock band the Dandy Warhols. It was released on June 16, 1997, as the first single from their second studio album, ...The Dandy Warhols Come Down, and charted in four countries: Australia, the Netherlands, the United Kingdom, and the United States.

== Background and content ==
As documented in the film Dig!, the song is dedicated to the band the Brian Jonestown Massacre, friends and rivals of the Dandy Warhols, who in turn dedicated their own track "Not If You Were the Last Dandy on Earth" to them. Frontman Courtney Taylor-Taylor revealed in an interview that the song is also about his girlfriend. He said, "There is nothing fucking playful about coming home from your first tour ever, and discovering that your girlfriend of four years has become – in one week – a fucking heroin addict."

The song is known for its refrain "I never thought you'd be a junkie because heroin is so passé". Because of this, the song has often been erroneously titled "Heroin Is So Passé", and the song was later subtitled with this in some markets.

== Release ==
"Not If You Were the Last Junkie on Earth" was released in 1997 as the first single from ...The Dandy Warhols Come Down. It peaked at number 13 on the UK Singles Chart and number 31 on the US Billboard Modern Rock Tracks chart.

== Music video ==
The music video for the song, directed by David LaChapelle, features the group "playing among a troupe of dancing syringes" and was called an "arch, playful, taboo-shredding hoot" by Mojo.

== Track listings ==
All tracks were written and composed by Courtney Taylor-Taylor except where indicated.

UK CD1

1. "Not If You Were the Last Junkie on Earth"
2. "Not If You Were the Last Junkie on Earth" (live)
3. "It's a Fast Drivin' Rave Up with the Dandy Warhols Sixteen Minutes" (live) (Taylor-Taylor, Eric Hedford, Peter Holmström) – 7:17

UK CD2

1. "Not If You Were the Last Junkie on Earth"
2. "Genius" (live)
3. "Ride" (live)

UK 7-inch single

A. "Not If You Were the Last Junkie on Earth"
B. "Genius" (live)

Australian CD single

1. "Not If You Were the Last Junkie on Earth (Heroin Is So Passé)" – 3:12
2. "One (Ultra Lame White Boy)" – 3:10
3. "Head" – 3:16

== Charts ==
Weekly chart performance for "Not If You Were the Last Junkie on Earth"
Chart (1997–1998)	Peak position
Australia (ARIA)	47
Europe (Eurochart Hot 100)	73
Netherlands (Single Top 100)	98
Scotland Singles (Official Charts)	12
UK Singles (Official Charts)	13
US Modern Rock Tracks (Billboard)	31

== Release history ==
Release dates and formats for "Not If You Were the Last Junkie on Earth"
Region	Date	Format(s)	Label(s)	Ref.
United States	June 16, 1997	College; modern rock radio	Capitol; Tim/Kerr	
United Kingdom	April 20, 1998	7-inch vinyl; CD	Capitol; Tim/Kerr	
