= You Are Killing Me =

Single by The Dandy Warhols

from the album Distortland
- Released: January 8, 2016
- Genre: Alternative rock; power pop
- Length: 3:41
- Label: Dine Alone
- Songwriter(s): Courtney Taylor-Taylor

The Dandy Warhols singles chronology
"Blackbird" (2009)	"You Are Killing Me" (2016)

"You Are Killing Me" is a song by American alternative rock band The Dandy Warhols, released as the first official single from their ninth studio album Distortland (2016).

== Composition ==
"You Are Killing Me" was described by The A.V. Club as featuring a "sparse arrangement consisting of straightforward, chugging, overdriven guitar, multi-tracked vocals, and slightly off kilter harmonies".

== Music video ==
The music video features the actor and Warhol superstar, Joe Dallesandro and is seen as a semi-autobiographical story about his alcohol addiction.

== Content ==
Pryor Stroud of PopMatters described the song as "a straightforward, chomp-rock ballad that glides forward with a spry Magnetic Fields-esque melody".
