= Odditorium or Warlords of Mars =

Studio album by The Dandy Warhols
- Released: September 13, 2005
- Recorded: April 2004 – January 2005
- Studio: The Odditorium, Portland, Oregon, United States
- Genre: Neo-psychedelia
- Length: 62:09
- Label: Capitol
- Producer: Courtney Taylor-Taylor; Gregg Williams

The Dandy Warhols chronology
The Black Album/Come On Feel The Dandy Warhols (2004)	Odditorium or Warlords of Mars (2005)	...Earth to the Dandy Warhols... (2008)

Singles from Odditorium or Warlords of Mars
- 1. "Smoke It" Released: August 29, 2005; 2. "All the Money or the Simple Life Honey" Released: October 29, 2005

Odditorium or Warlords of Mars is the fifth studio album by American rock band The Dandy Warhols. It was recorded from April 2004 to January 2005 in the band's own Odditorium studio, and was released on September 13, 2005, through Capitol Records; their final album before parting ways with the label.

The album is a return to the psychedelic, guitar-based sound of the group's earlier records, following their foray into a new wave style with 2003's Welcome to the Monkey House. The album failed to meet up to the commercial success of its predecessors and received a mixed response from music critics. Two singles were released from the album: "Smoke It" and "All the Money or the Simple Life Honey".

== Background and production ==
The album's title references the novel The Warlord of Mars by Edgar Rice Burroughs as well as the band's Portland, Oregon pad The Odditorium, where the album was recorded from between April 2004 and January 2005. It was produced by Courtney Taylor-Taylor and Gregg Williams. Bandmember Zia McCabe worked on the album during a pregnancy with her first child, Matilda Louise, and gave birth only a week after its completion.

== Release ==
The first single from the album, "Smoke It", was released on August 29, 2005. It peaked at No. 59 on the UK Singles Chart. The Guardian praised the song, saying it "reeks of rock's decadent best". The song was featured in "Cheatty Cheatty Bang Bang", an episode of Veronica Mars.

Odditorium or Warlords of Mars was released on September 13, 2005. It peaked at No. 89 in the US Billboard chart—their second highest charting album to date—and No. 67 in the UK, staying in both charts for only one week.

The album's second and final single, "All the Money or the Simple Life Honey", was released on October 29.

== Reception ==
Professional ratings
Aggregate scores
Source	Rating
Metacritic	57/100
Review scores
Source	Rating
AllMusic	3/5 stars
Robert Christgau	(1-star Honorable Mention)
Drowned in Sound	8/10
The Guardian	4/5 stars
NME	6/10
Pitchfork	1.2/10
PopMatters	5/10
Rolling Stone	2/5 stars

Critics were divided on their opinion of the album. The Guardian wrote, "The Dandy Warhols seem to knock out great music as easily as getting out of bed. Their fifth album further expands their palette of effortless cool", calling it "their best yet." Drowned in Sound called it "an album full of creative magic and songwriting gems." Trouser Press wrote: "Odditorium is the Dandys' magnum opus, a sprawling, rambling but somehow coherent result of the ambitions developed on previous albums".

AllMusic, on the other hand, called it "half inspired, half-embarrassing and completely self-indulgent." Pitchfork gave the album an exceptionally low 1.2/10 rating, writing "only the truly earless would mistake this assortment of bloated in-jokes and interminable, sub-song drones for some kind of masterpiece." Alternative Press wrote, "Basically, Odditorium sounds like a giant "fuck you" to [their] record label." The album appeared at number 242 in the Village Voice annual Pazz and Jop critics poll.

Frontman Courtney Taylor-Taylor once called the album "definitely the strongest we've ever made", though would later state it was "a f**k(sic) you record. Drop us, please, we want off your label."

== Track listing ==
All tracks are written by Courtney Taylor-Taylor, except where noted

Odditorium or Warlords of Mars track listing
No.	Title	Writer(s)	Length
1.	"Colder Than the Coldest Winter Was Cold" (intro)		1:02
2.	"Love Is the New Feel Awful"		9:36
3.	"Easy"		7:32
4.	"All the Money or the Simple Life Honey"	Taylor-Taylor, Miles Zuniga	4:29
5.	"The New Country"	Taylor-Taylor, Peter Holmström	2:10
6.	"Holding Me Up"		7:15
7.	"Did You Make a Song with Otis" (interlude)		0:55
8.	"Everyone Is Totally Insane"		3:41
9.	"Smoke It"	Taylor-Taylor, Zuniga	4:06
10.	"Down Like Disco"		4:54
11.	"There Is Only This Time"	Taylor-Taylor, Holmström	4:40
12.	"A Loan Tonight"	Taylor-Taylor, Holmström, Zia McCabe, Brent DeBoer	11:49

Japan bonus track
No.	Title	Writer(s)	Length
13.	"11cc"	Taylor-Taylor, Holmström	8:16

== Personnel ==
The Dandy Warhols

- Courtney Taylor-Taylor – vocals, guitar, keyboards, percussion, production, album cover concept
- Peter Holmström – guitar, vocals
- Zia McCabe – keyboards, vocals
- Brent DeBoer – drums, guitar, vocals

Additional personnel

- Lockett Allbritton – vocals on "Did You Make a Song with Otis"
- Achilleas Anastasopolis – trumpet
- Eric Early – banjo
- John Fell – additional vocals on "Did You Make a Song with Otis"
- Sean Gothman – "number nine" on "Smoke It"
- Travis Hendricks – trombone, additional vocals on "Did You Make a Song with Otis"
- Herb Kirshrot – accordion
- Bill Kurtis – narration on "Colder Than the Coldest Winter Was Cold"
- Michele Loew – additional vocals on "Holding Me Up"
- Caleb Spiegel – additional vocals on "Holding Me Up"
- Gregg Williams – additional percussion, additional vocals on "Did You Make a Song with Otis"
- Steven Birch – album design, layout
- Tchad Blake – mixing
- Ted Jensen – mastering
- Clark Stiles – editing, additional production
- Gregg Williams – production, recording, editing
- Scott Young – album front cover artwork

== Charts ==
Chart performance for Odditorium or Warlords of Mars
Chart (2005)	Peak position
Australian Albums (ARIA)	19
Belgian Albums (Ultratop Wallonia)	56
French Albums (SNEP)	52
Irish Albums (IRMA)	75
Norwegian Albums (VG-lista)	18
Swiss Albums (Schweizer Hitparade)	85
UK Albums (OCC)	67
US Billboard 200	89
