= Chris Anthony (artist) =

Swedish photographer

Chris Anthony is an artist from Stockholm, primarily known for his macabre and Victorian Gothic-inspired photographs. Anthony has also directed commercials for companies such as Deutsche Telekom, USC, Dell and music videos for groups such as The Dandy Warhols.

Anthony is currently based in Los Angeles.
