= Distortland =

Studio album by the Dandy Warhols
- Released: April 8, 2016
- Genre: Neo-psychedelia
- Length: 33:28
- Label: Dine Alone

The Dandy Warhols chronology
This Machine (2012)	Distortland (2016)	Why You So Crazy (2019)

Singles from Distortland
- 1. "You Are Killing Me" Released: January 8, 2016; 2. "STYGGO" Released: March 3, 2016; 3. "Catcher in the Rye" Released: March 25, 2016

Distortland is the ninth studio album by American alternative rock band the Dandy Warhols, released on April 8, 2016 by record label Dine Alone.

== Background and content ==
Following the band's eighth studio album This Machine in 2012, the band released the stand-alone single "Chauncey P vs. All the Girls in London" in 2015, which was reworked and included on Distortland under the shortened title "All the Girls in London". Along with "STYGGO", then presented in its full title "Some Things You Gotta Get Over", and "You Are Killing Me", the song was often played during the band's 2015 tour.

== Release ==
Three singles were released to promote the album: "You Are Killing Me" on January 8, 2016, for which a music video was made, "STYGGO" on March 3 and "Catcher in the Rye" on March 25, though only "You Are Killing Me" was made available for purchase.

Distortland was released on April 8 by record label Dine Alone. One further single, "Catcher in the Rye", was released though only "You Are Killing Me" was made available for purchase.

== Reception ==
Professional ratings
Aggregate scores
Source	Rating
Metacritic	64/100
Review scores
Source	Rating
AllMusic	3.5/5 stars
Consequence of Sound	B−
Drowned in Sound	7/10
Mojo	3/5 stars
MusicOMH	2.5/5 stars
PopMatters	7/10 stars
Q	3/5 stars
Record Collector	3/5 stars
Uncut	2/5 stars

Distortland received generally favorable reviews from critics. Drowned in Sound wrote: "Distortland represents the kind of mix and match bag of tricks we've come to expect from The Dandy Warhols and while not quite attaining classic status, is a welcome return for a band who've never been afraid to stick two fingers in the face of adversity", while MusicOMH wrote that the album "too often sounds like a diluted version of what's gone before, a collection that struggles to reach the highs of old. The band's biggest fans are likely to go through a multitude of emotions before accepting that, as evidenced by Taylor-Taylor's increasingly breathless vocals, this might just be the first signs of their favourite band finally running out of puff and coming down."

== Track listing ==
No.	Title	Length
1.	"Search Party"	3:42
2.	"Semper Fidelis"	3:25
3.	"Pope Reverend Jim"	3:46
4.	"Catcher in the Rye"	3:02
5.	"STYGGO"	4:18
6.	"Give"	2:57
7.	"You Are Killing Me"	3:41
8.	"All the Girls in London"	2:45
9.	"Doves"	4:14
10.	"The Grow Up Song"	1:38
11.	"The Wizard of Oslo" (hidden track on CD version only)	0:52

== Charts ==
Chart (2016)	Peak position
Australian Albums (ARIA)	57
Belgian Albums (Ultratop Flanders)	75
Belgian Albums (Ultratop Wallonia)	63
French Albums (SNEP)	98
Swiss Albums (Schweizer Hitparade)	84
UK Albums (Official Charts)	131
US Independent Albums (Billboard)	25
US Top Rock Albums (Billboard)	43
US Indie Store Album Sales (Billboard)	13
