= ...The Dandy Warhols Come Down =

Studio album by The Dandy Warhols
- Released: July 15, 1997
- Studios: Sound Impressions; Stiles Recording; Falcon Studios; Courtney Taylor-Taylor's apartment, Portland, Oregon, United States
- Genres: Alternative rock; power pop; space rock; psychedelic rock; punk rock
- Length: 66:23
- Label: Capitol
- Producers: Tony Lash; Courtney Taylor-Taylor

The Dandy Warhols chronology
Dandys Rule OK (1995)	...The Dandy Warhols Come Down (1997)	Thirteen Tales from Urban Bohemia (2000)

Singles from ...The Dandy Warhols Come Down
- 1. "Not If You Were the Last Junkie on Earth" Released: June 16, 1997; 2. "Every Day Should Be a Holiday" Released: July 15, 1997; 3. "Boys Better" Released: 1998

...The Dandy Warhols Come Down is the second studio album by American rock band The Dandy Warhols. It was released on July 15, 1997, by Capitol.

Three singles were released from the album: "Not If You Were the Last Junkie on Earth", "Every Day Should Be a Holiday" and "Boys Better".

This is the final studio album to feature drummer Eric Hedford, who quit the band during the tour, and was replaced with Taylor-Taylor's cousin Brent DeBoer.

== Recording and The Black Album ==
The band's first effort for Capitol Records was an album which was recorded before Come Down called The Black Album, which was rejected by Capitol for, according to frontman Courtney Taylor-Taylor, containing "no hit songs". It was later released as a double album in 2004 with Come On Feel the Dandy Warhols, an album composed of B-sides and previously unreleased material.

After rejecting "The Black Album" Capitol reached out to Tony Lash, who had co-produced Dandys Rule OK, to produce. ...The Dandy Warhols Come Down was recorded in 1996–1997 at Sound Impressions, Stiles Recording, Falcon Studios, and Courtney Taylor-Taylor's apartment in Portland, Oregon.

According to Taylor-Taylor, it took the band a long time to get noticed by major labels, due to the prevalence of the grunge scene in the Pacific Northwest. In a June 1997 interview with Billboard, he remarked, "When we came up, there were a group of bands that didn't get recognition because people weren't appreciating what it was we were doing. A lot of us were more influenced by Galaxie 500 than the post-pubescent, fanzine, Nirvana-angst, college thing that was so prevalent at the time."

== Musical style ==
The album featured a shift in style from the garage rock influenced sound of their previous album, 1995's Dandys Rule OK, to a more and pop-influenced sound.

Taylor compared the track "Good Morning" to the style of musician Lloyd Cole.

== Release ==
...The Dandy Warhols Come Down was released on July 15, 1997, by Capitol.

Three singles were released from the album: "Not If You Were the Last Junkie on Earth", which helped to establish the band's popularity; "Every Day Should Be a Holiday", which reached No. 29 on the UK Singles Chart; and "Boys Better", which reached No. 36 on the same chart.

It is the final album with founding member Eric Hedford, who was replaced by frontman Courtney Taylor-Taylor's cousin Brent DeBoer in 1998.

== Reception ==
Professional ratings
Review scores
Source	Rating
AllMusic	3/5 stars
Encyclopedia of Popular Music	4/5 stars
The Guardian	3/5 stars
Houston Chronicle	3/5 stars
NME	7/10
Pitchfork	6.5/10
Q	4/5 stars
Rolling Stone	3.5/5 stars
The Rolling Stone Album Guide	3/5 stars
USA Today	3.5/4 stars

...The Dandy Warhols Come Down has sold 103,000 copies in the U.S. as of 2008.

The album has received a generally positive reception from critics. AllMusic criticized the album's consistency, writing, "the band has talent for not just punchy hooks but for layered sonics as well, but they don't know how to meld the two together." Rolling Stone, on the other hand, called it "the most exhilarating '60s-into-'90s excursion yet attempted by an American band", following with "if this is The Dandy Warhols coming down, the mind boggles at the thought of them flying high."

== Legacy ==
The album was included in the book 1001 Albums You Must Hear Before You Die. Pitchfork also included it in their The Best Britpop Albums... That Aren't British list.

"Boys Better" was featured on the soundtrack for the films Good Will Hunting, Igby Goes Down, Jay and Silent Bob Strike Back and Jay and Silent Bob Reboot. "Every Day Should Be a Holiday" was featured in the movie There's Something About Mary, Fanboys and the trailer for Sideways

== Track listing ==
All tracks are written by Courtney Taylor-Taylor, except where noted.

No.	Title	Writer(s)	Length
1.	"Be-In"		7:00
2.	"Boys Better"		4:30
3.	"Minnesoter"		3:04
4.	"Orange"		5:40
5.	"I Love You"		4:13
6.	"Not If You Were the Last Junkie on Earth"		3:10
7.	"Every Day Should Be a Holiday"		4:02
8.	"Good Morning"		5:00
9.	"Whipping Tree"		3:50
10.	"Green"		3:10
11.	"Cool as Kim Deal"		3:04
12.	"Hard On for Jesus"	Taylor-Taylor, Peter Holmström	4:36
13.	"Pete International Airport"	Taylor-Taylor, Holmström	5:56
14.	"The Creep Out"	Taylor-Taylor, Holmström, Zia McCabe, Eric Hedford	9:00

Vinyl bonus track
No.	Title	Length
15.	"One"	3:06

== Personnel ==
The Dandy Warhols

- Courtney Taylor-Taylor – lead vocals, guitar, mixing on "Whipping Tree", production and album sleeve design and art direction
- Peter Holmström – guitar, additional vocals
- Zia McCabe – keyboard bass, keyboards, percussion, additional vocals
- Eric Hedford – drums, backing vocals

Additional personnel

- Tony Lash – keyboards, percussion, drums on "Minnesoter"
- Aquaman – additional production on "Every Day Should Be a Holiday"
- Steven Birch – album design and art direction
- Jeff Bizzell – sleeve photography (larger live photos)
- Tchad Blake – mixing on tracks 1–7 and 10–12 at: Sunset Sound Factory, Hollywood, California
- Mario Caldato Jr. – mixing and additional production on "The Creep Out" at Bundy's, Los Angeles, California
- S. Husky Höskulds – engineering assistance
- Lisa Johnson – sleeve photography
- Mario Lalich – album cover photography
- Tony Lash – production, recording; mixing on "Good Morning" and "Pete International Airport" at White Horse Studios, Portland, Oregon
- Bob Ludwig – mastering at Gateway Mastering, Portland, Maine
- Mickey Petralia – mixing on "The Creep Out"
- David Schiffman – additional recording
- Clark Stiles – additional recording

== Charts ==
Chart (1998)	Peak position
Australian Albums (ARIA)	91
Dutch Albums (Album Top 100)	86
UK Albums (Official Charts)	16
US Heatseekers Albums (Billboard)	22

== Certifications ==
Region	Certification	Certified units/sales
United Kingdom (BPI)	Gold	100,000^{^}
^{^} Shipments figures based on certification alone.
