= The Dandy Warhols =

American alternative rock band

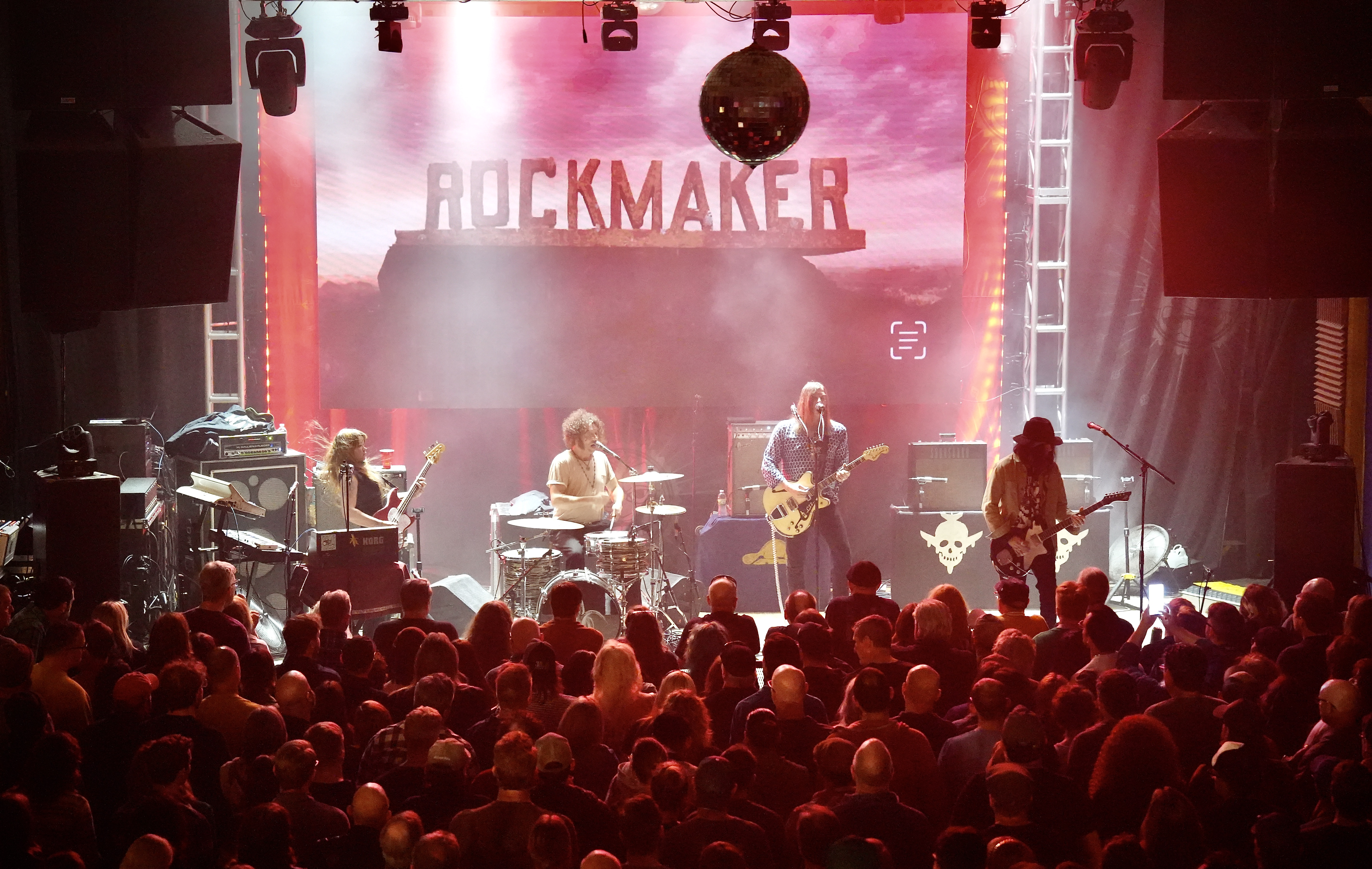
- The Dandy Warhols in 2024

Background information
- Origin: Portland, Oregon, U.S.
- Genres: Neo-psychedelia; alternative rock; shoegaze; power pop; garage rock
- Years active: 1994–present
- Labels: Beat the World; Capitol; The End; Tim/Kerr; Dine Alone
- Spinoffs: Immigrant Union; Pete International Airport; Telephone; Brush Prairie; Rebel Drones
- Members: Courtney Taylor-Taylor; Peter Holmström; Zia McCabe; Brent DeBoer
- Past members: Eric Hedford
- Website: dandywarhols.com

The Dandy Warhols are an American psychedelic/alternative rock band, formed in Portland, Oregon, in 1994 by singer-guitarist Courtney Taylor-Taylor and guitarist Peter Holmström. They were later joined by keyboardist Zia McCabe and drummer Eric Hedford. Hedford left in 1998 and was replaced by Taylor-Taylor's cousin Brent DeBoer. The band's name is a play on the name of American pop artist Andy Warhol.

The band gained recognition after they were signed to Capitol Records and released their major label album debut, ...The Dandy Warhols Come Down, in 1997. In 2001, the band rose to new levels of fame after their song "Bohemian Like You" enjoyed extensive exposure due to being featured in a Vodafone advertisement. The Dandy Warhols were the subject of the 2004 documentary film Dig!, along with San Francisco psychedelic outfit The Brian Jonestown Massacre. They have released 12 studio albums, two compilation albums, six EPs, and 27 singles to date.

== Biography ==
=== Early years (1994–1995) ===
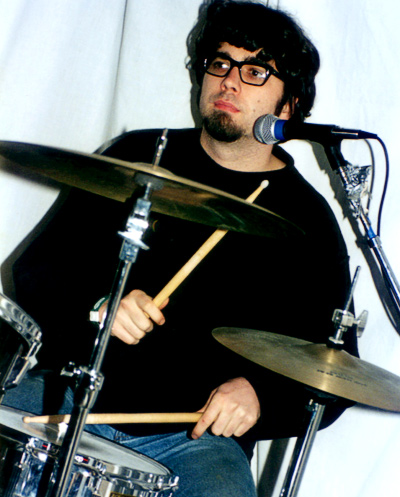
Original drummer Eric Hedford in 1997

The Dandy Warhols were formed in Portland, Oregon in 1994 by Courtney Taylor-Taylor and Peter Holmström. Soon after, drummer Eric Hedford joined, and, following an unsuccessful experiment with Taylor-Taylor's girlfriend on bass guitar, Zia McCabe joined the band as keyboardist after Taylor-Taylor saw her working in a coffeehouse. Taylor-Taylor described the band's beginning as a group of friends who "needed music to drink to".

Early in their career, The Dandy Warhols performed in bars throughout Portland and became well known for their nudity-filled live shows. At their first gig in 1994, they were approached by record label Tim/Kerr, who offered to pay for the recording of an album. The result was 1995's Dandys Rule OK. Musically, Dandys Rule OK combined elements of 1960s garage rock, the then-popular Britpop genre, and a shoegaze approach.

=== Signing to Capitol and ...The Dandy Warhols Come Down (1996–1998) ===
Major record label Capitol Records were impressed by Dandys Rule OK, and decided to sign the band. In 1997, they released their second studio album, ...The Dandy Warhols Come Down. It was their second attempt at a follow-up album, after their first attempt was rejected by Capitol, who claimed it did not have any "hits". Three singles were released for Come Down, all of which entered the Top 40 in the UK Singles Chart. Being their first record on a major label, Come Down featured a more commercial, polished psychedelic and power pop-influenced sound.

In 1998, drummer Eric Hedford left the band after a dispute over royalties, and was replaced by Taylor-Taylor's cousin Brent DeBoer.

=== Thirteen Tales from Urban Bohemia and mainstream popularity (1998–2001) ===
In 2000, the band released their third studio album, Thirteen Tales from Urban Bohemia. It was a critical and commercial success, due mainly to the single "Bohemian Like You" being featured in a popular Vodafone advertisement as well as on the TV show Buffy the Vampire Slayer. The song has also been featured in the animated movie Flushed Away in a chase scene, and on the soundtrack album for the film Igby Goes Down.

Thirteen Tales from Urban Bohemia featured a less overdriven sound, with less overt psychedelia and more stylings in common with the power pop genre.

Around this time, Taylor-Taylor took out a loan to acquire an industrial warehouse space in northwest Portland, dubbed "The Odditorium" and occupying a quarter city block. The Odditorium is the band's eclectic rehearsal space and recording and mixing studio. It also serves as an art space and clubhouse for parties and other events. It opened on November 15, 2001.

=== Welcome to the Monkey House (2001–2003) ===
Becoming a fan of the band after seeing them play at the Glastonbury Festival in 2000, David Bowie personally selected The Dandy Warhols to play at the 2002 Meltdown festival. Bowie and the Dandys played a rendition of The Velvet Underground's "White Light/White Heat" together as an encore to the July 29 gig, which was billed as The New Heathens Night. The band also supported Bowie on his 2003 A Reality Tour.

In September 2001, the band began work on their next studio album. The result was Welcome to the Monkey House, released in 2003. Produced by Nick Rhodes of Duran Duran, the album featured a major shift towards a 1980s-influenced synthpop sound.

The album was spearheaded by its first single, "We Used to Be Friends", which went on to become one of the band's most popular tracks, gaining exposure through use as the theme song for the American cult television show Veronica Mars, as well as an appearance in The O.C. Two further singles, "You Were the Last High" and "Plan A", were released in promotion of the album. This song was also featured in EA Sport FIFA 2004.

=== Dig!, and other developments (2004) ===
Along with band The Brian Jonestown Massacre, The Dandy Warhols were the subjects of the 2004 documentary film Dig!. The film captured a love–hate relationship between the two bands, highlighting the interaction of Taylor-Taylor and BJM frontman Anton Newcombe. It was recorded over the course of seven years by filmmaker Ondi Timoner, and won the Documentary Grand Jury Prize at the 2004 Sundance Film Festival.

In the same year, the band released a double album, comprising The Black Album – the album recorded before ...The Dandy Warhols Come Down that was rejected by Capitol Records and also dismissed by the band themselves – and Come on Feel The Dandy Warhols, a collection of B-sides, cover versions and unreleased songs.

The Dandy Warhols appeared in the 2004 film 9 Songs, performing a live rendition of the song "You Were the Last High" as one of the film's titular "nine songs".

=== Odditorium or Warlords of Mars (2004–2007) ===
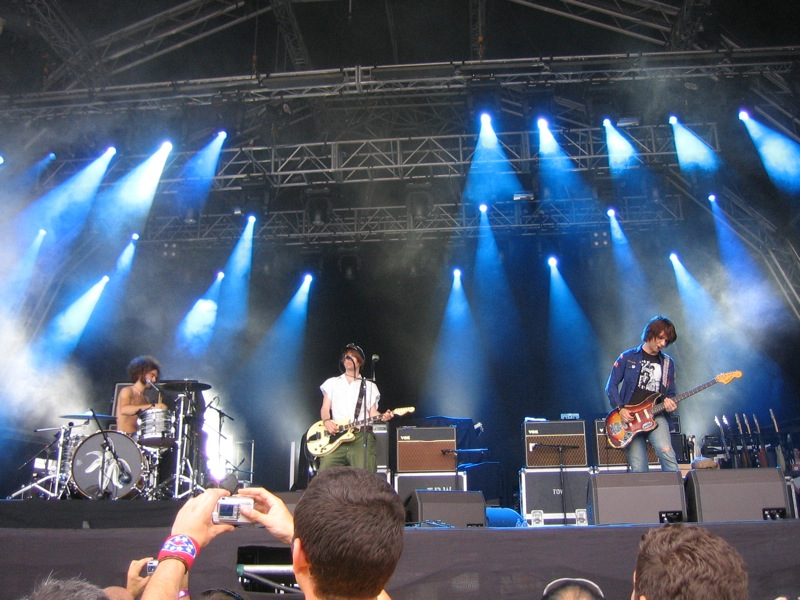
The Dandy Warhols at the Summercase festival in 2006

The Dandy Warhols started work on their next studio album in mid-2004. The result was Odditorium or Warlords of Mars, released the following year. It was partially named after and recorded in the band's own studio, The Odditorium.

Odditorium or Warlords of Mars was largely a return to the psychedelic, guitar-orientated rock of ...The Dandy Warhols Come Down, moving away from the synth-heavy sound of their previous album, Welcome to the Monkey House. Two singles were released from the album: "Smoke It" and "All the Money or the Simple Life Honey". The album received a mixed response from music critics.

Around this time, the band contributed to the soundtrack of the video game Stubbs the Zombie in Rebel Without a Pulse with a cover of "All I Have to Do Is Dream" by The Everly Brothers.

On July 17, 2006, the band released a stand-alone single, "Have a Kick Ass Summer (Me and My Friends)". The song was later re-recorded as "Mis Amigos" for their 2008 album ...Earth to The Dandy Warhols... It was later featured in the downloadable song pack for the Xbox video game Dance Dance Revolution ULTRAMIX 4. In 2007, the band recorded the song "Good Luck Chuck" for the 2007 film of the same name. It was released as a digital single.

=== Split with Capitol, Beat the World Records launch (2008) ===
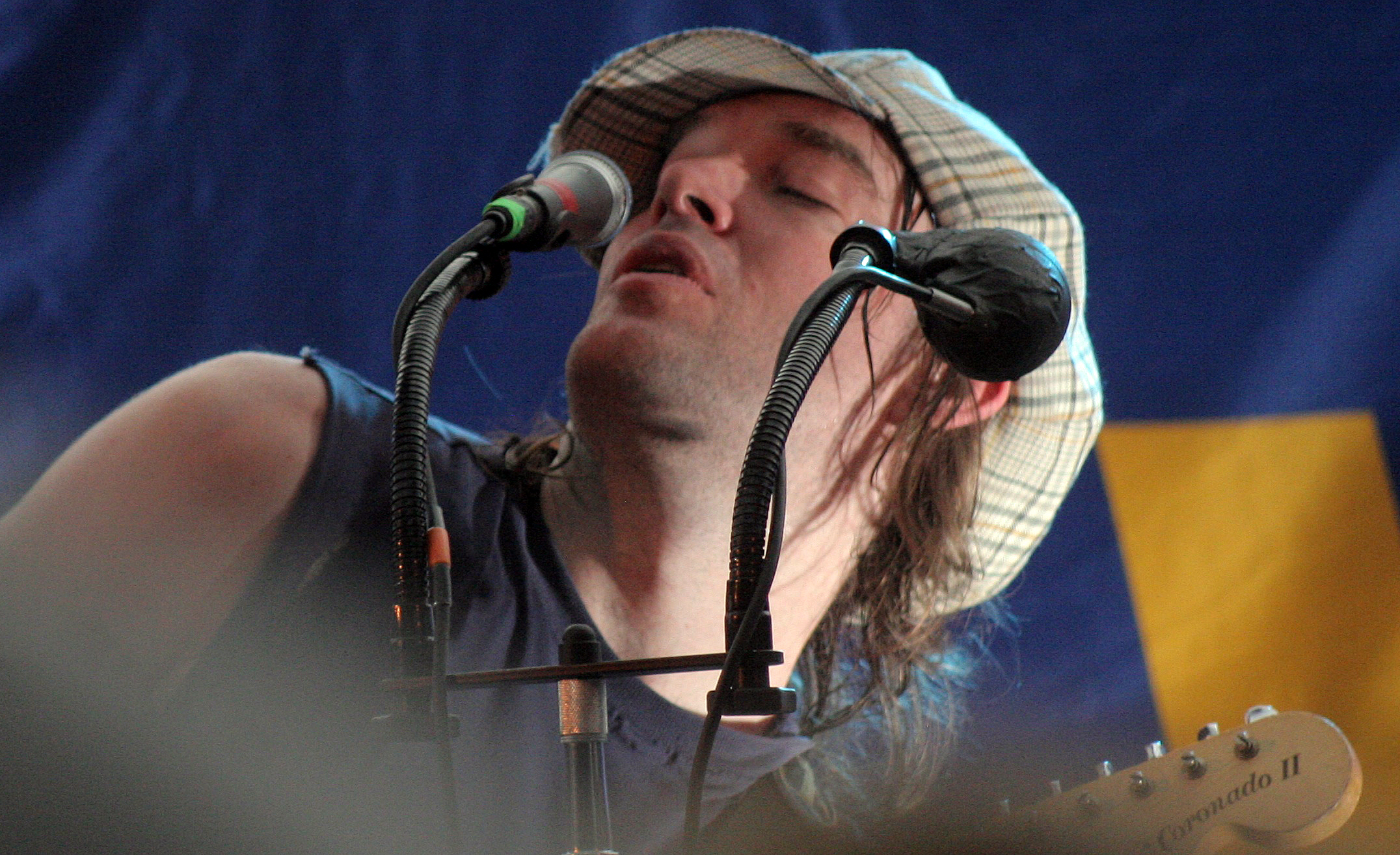
Courtney Taylor-Taylor of The Dandy Warhols in 2007 in Seattle.

In 2007, The Dandy Warhols formed Beat the World Records, a third-party record label of Caroline Records. Portland shoegaze outfit The Upsidedown were signed, followed by independent electropop artist Logan Lynn. In 2008, the band split with long-time record company Capitol Records. Bands Rockers Monstrous, The Hugs, Spindrift and 1776 were signed in the years which followed.

The band covered The Cure's song "Primary" for the charity album Perfect as Cats: A Tribute to The Cure, released in 2008 on Manimal Vinyl Records, with profits going to Invisible Children, Inc. The band also contributed to the Love and Rockets tribute album No New Tales to Tell: A Tribute to Love and Rockets in the same year, covering the song "Inside the Outside".

=== ...Earth to The Dandy Warhols..., Beat the World Records roster (2008–2010) ===
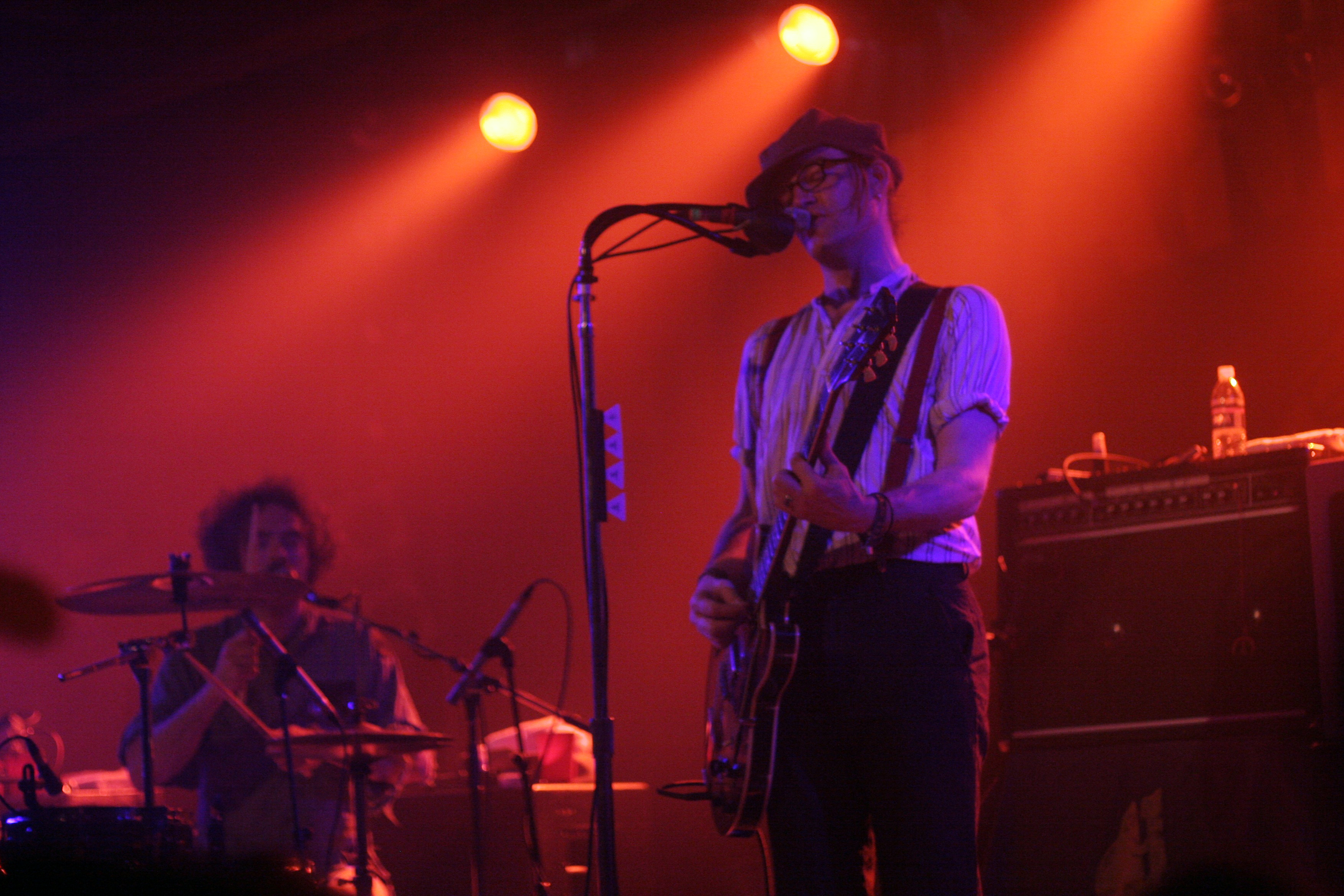
Courtney Taylor-Taylor in 2008 in Seattle

In 2008, The Dandy Warhols released their sixth studio album, ...Earth to The Dandy Warhols.... It was the first official release on Beat the World. Shortly thereafter, they put out an EP, Earth to the Remix E.P. Volume One, consisting of electronic remixed versions of tracks from ...Earth... as well as Earth to the Remix E.P. Volume Two. The label also released Logan Lynn's Feed Me to the Wolves EP and a full-length album from The Upsidedown.

Also in 2008, The Dandy Warhols announced they were releasing a collaborative album called Breathe Easy to benefit conservation projects. The recordings, which started on October 21, 2008, took place at the band's Odditorium studio. They collaborated with bands such as The Bravery, The Kooks, Dinosaur Jr.'s J Mascis and Spoon. Not much is known about the status of the project, and recordings are not readily available.

Logan Lynn released his critically acclaimed album From Pillar to Post on Beat the World in September 2009.

In November 2009, The Dandy Warhols released a cover of The Beatles' song "Blackbird" in tribute to the death of Michael Jackson. This references the lyrics of their 2003 song "Welcome to the Monkey House": "When Michael Jackson dies/We're covering Blackbird".

In an interview from 2010 with the Australian Daily Telegraph tabloid newspaper, Taylor-Taylor was quoted as saying: "We're terrible at business, terrible. We don't know what we're doing. It's like trying to have children run a household. We need to hook up with some indie label." In an interview with German magazine Catch Fire from later that same year, Logan Lynn is quoted as saying, "I love the Warhols and everybody had really great intentions going in but ... No radio, no real distribution, no licensing, no PR. Without those things in place, artists fail ... and my last record fell victim to that." Monstrous, The Hugs and Spindrift never officially released anything on Beat the World.

=== The Capitol Years, split with Caroline/EMI, signing with The End Records ===
In 2010, The Dandy Warhols released The Capitol Years 1995–2007, a greatest hits album chronicling the band's years with Capitol Records. In addition to containing popular singles and songs from their Capitol albums, it also included a few alternative mixes as well as a new track, "This Is the Tide". The song debuted on Australian radio station Triple J on June 18, 2010. Three different music videos were released for the song.

Beat the World Records cut ties with Caroline Records in 2010 and began working with The End Records in 2011. 1776 released their debut album on Beat the World in 2011.

=== This Machine (2011–2013) ===
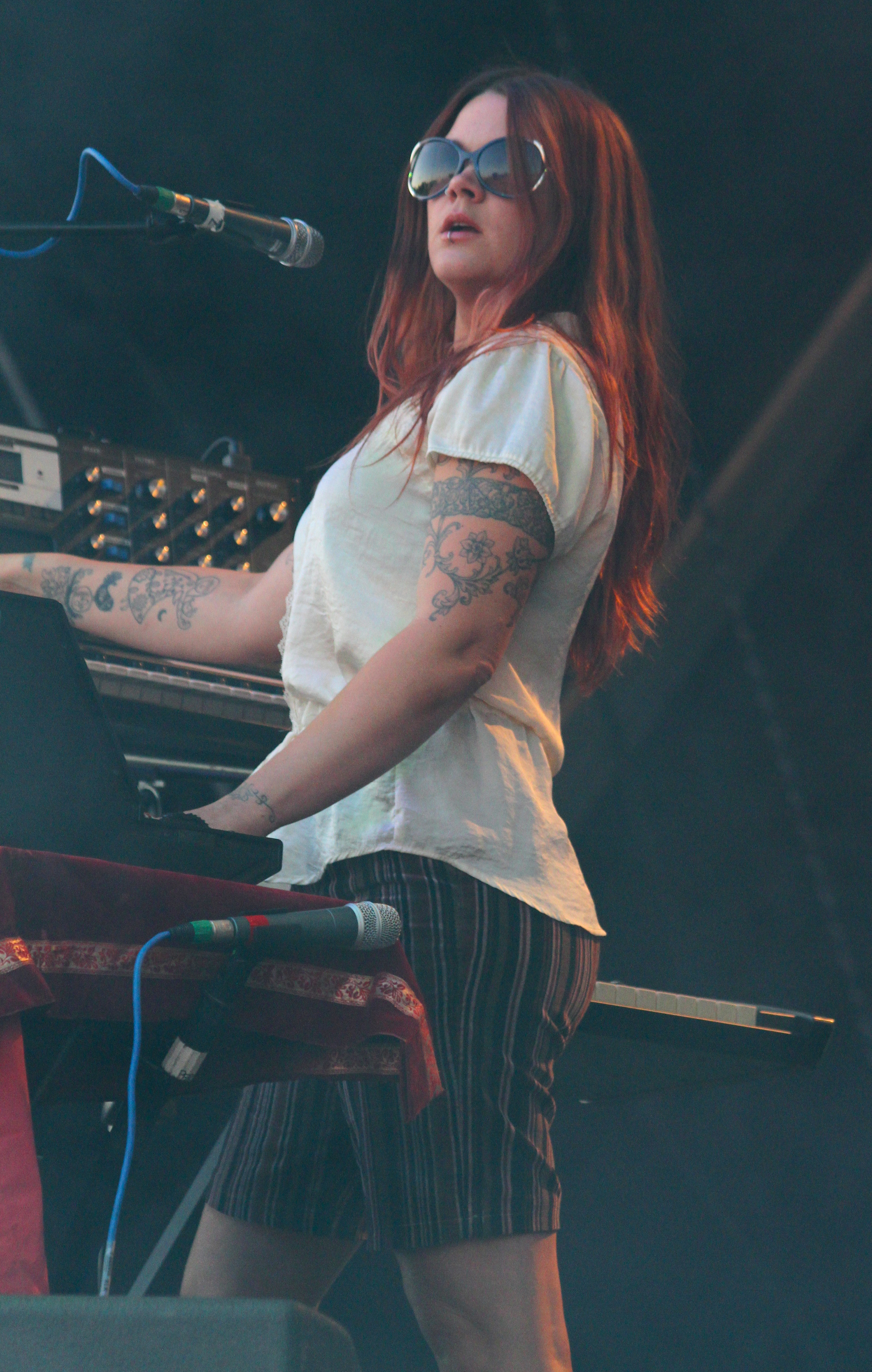
Zia McCabe at the 2012 Frequency Festival

That same year, the band announced they were recording a new album. While playing in Sydney's Enmore Theatre in May 2011 as part of their 2011 Australian tour, lead singer Courtney Taylor-Taylor announced the new album would be titled This Machine (after previously jokingly that it would be called either The Pastor of Muppets, Shitty Shitty Band Band or Whirled Piece in blog posts on the band's official website). On the same tour, the band debuted two new tracks from the album, "Seti vs. the Wow! Signal" and "Rest Your Head".

The Dandy Warhols "re-arranged and performed" the theme music to the popular science-based television show MythBusters. The updated theme music first appeared midway through the 2011 season, in the episode "Bikes and Bazookas". This subsequent theme was a revamp of the original and was used until the show had an overhaul starting in the 2015 season (thereby discontinuing the theme at the end of the 2014 season).

The band announced the release of the new album's first single, "Well They're Gone", on March 1, 2012, allowing visitors to download the track for free after entering their email address. A video for the track "Sad Vacation" was released on April 16.

This Machine was released on April 24, 2012. The album featured a collaboration with David J on the track "Autumn Carnival". It was seen as a more musically stripped-back and reserved album in comparison to their previous records.

=== Thirteen Tales from Urban Bohemia Live at the Wonder, Distortland and Why You So Crazy (2014–present) ===
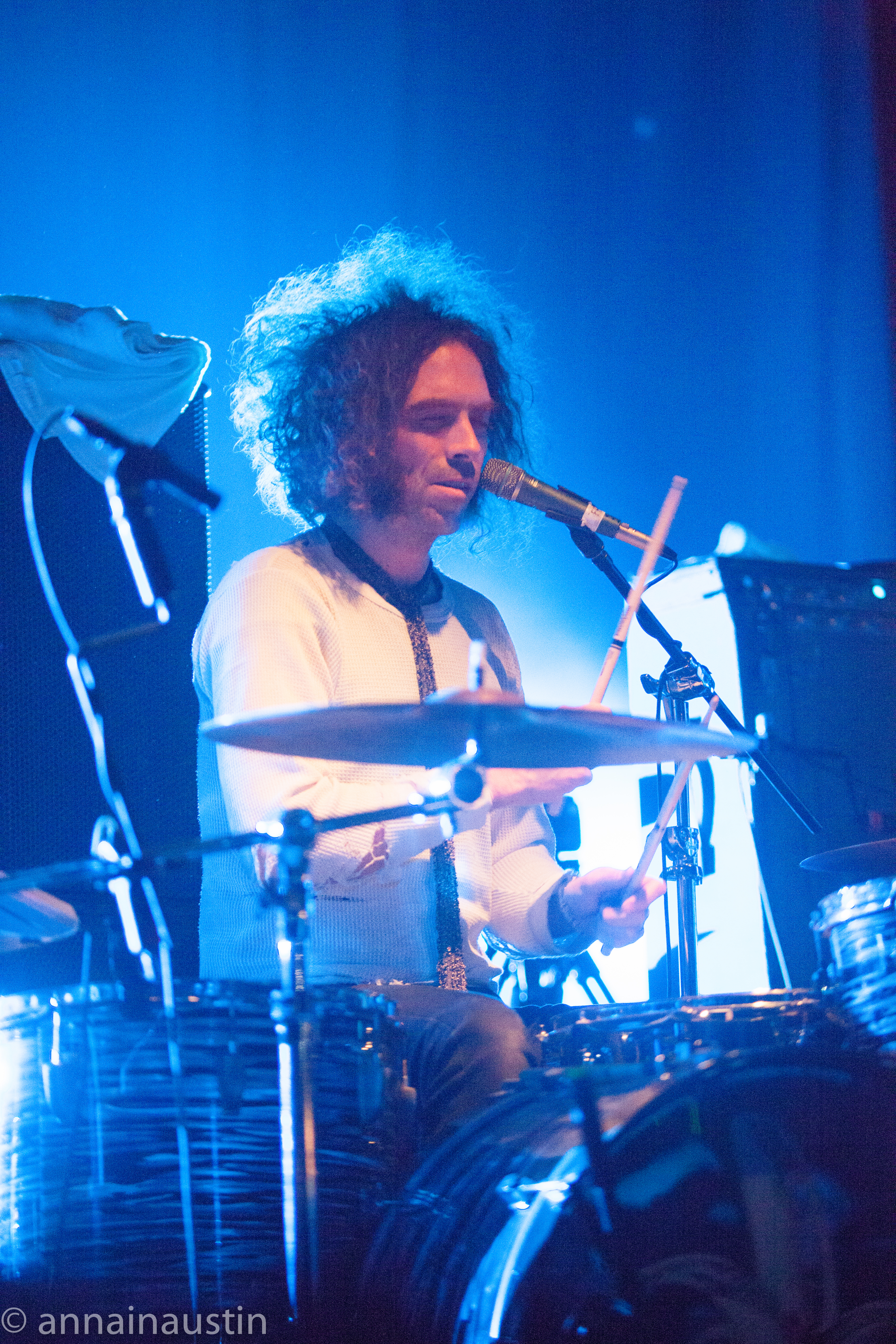
Brent DeBoer at the Austin Psych Fest in 2014

On January 28, 2014, The Dandy Warhols announced plans to release their first live album, which was recorded at The Wonder Ballroom during the band's thirteenth anniversary tour of Thirteen Tales from Urban Bohemia. The album, entitled Thirteen Tales from Urban Bohemia Live at the Wonder, was released on March 25, 2014.

The band released the single "Chauncey P vs. All the Girls in London" in March 2015.

On January 29, 2016, the band announced their ninth studio album, Distortland. It was their first release for Dine Alone Records. It was released on April 8, 2016, in time for their promotional tour starting in the United States. The track "You Are Killing Me" was released as a single. A music video was produced featuring noted Warhol superstar Joe Dallesandro.

On February 11, 2017, the band released a new single, "Thick Girls Knock Me Out (Richard Starkey)", to streaming services. The band has returned to the studio after the end of the promotional tour for Distortland and intends to spend the rest of the year recording new material.

On October 12, 2018 The Dandy Warhols released a collaboration with Logan Lynn titled “Like Before”, which appeared on Lynn’s multi-media double album My Movie Star, produced by Jay Mohr. On October 24, 2018, the band released a new single, "Forever", to streaming services. This is the first single off their 10th studio album, released in January 2019, titled Why You So Crazy. Two more singles preceded its release, "Be Alright" and "Motor City Steel". During the same month, the band started their 25th anniversary tour with a string of dates in Europe & UK.

In May 2023, the (digital) EP "The Wreck of the Edmund Fitzgerald" was released. The title track, originally written by Gordon Lightfoot, was a leftover for the 2004 Black Album sessions. The other two tracks, Untitled 1 and Alien, remained unreleased at the time.

IWNSLY is the title of the track released in July 2023. The song is a collaboration with Debbie Harry and NALA.

== Other developments ==
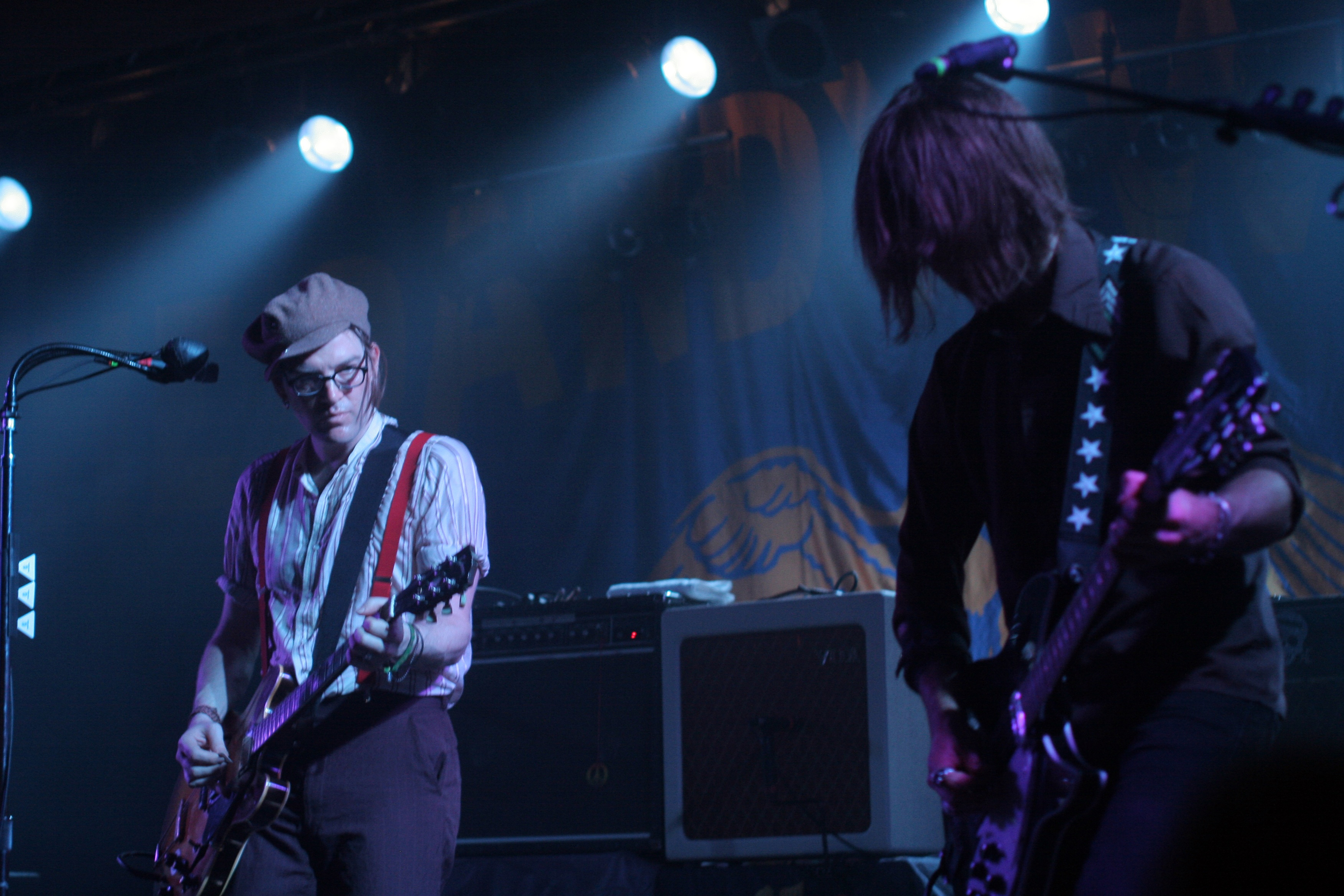
Courtney Taylor-Taylor and Peter Holmström of The Dandy Warhols in 2008 in Seattle.

Ex-member Eric Hedford went on to front the new wave revival group Telephone.

In 2009, Taylor-Taylor released a graphic novel entitled One Model Nation, co-written by Jim Rugg.

In 2010, drummer Brent DeBoer released his debut solo album, The Farmer. A music video for the song "You Win" was released. DeBoer now fronts the folk music-based band Immigrant Union. Former member Eric Hedford has replaced drummer Brent DeBoer at some concerts and at some studio sessions and recordings while DeBoer is in Australia.

Guitarist Peter Holmström fronts the neo-psychedelia musical project Pete International Airport, which was named after the Dandy Warhols' song of the same name, and has featured members from bands such as The Lovetones, The Brian Jonestown Massacre, and The Upsidedown. Pete International Airport has released two full-length albums. Holmström has also played in the band Rebel Drones with Matt Hollywood of BJM, and has also appeared as a guest musician on The Dead Stars on Hollywood's EP Anthems for the Friendly-Fire Generation. Keyboardist Zia McCabe founded and plays with country music band Brush Prairie.

== Band members ==
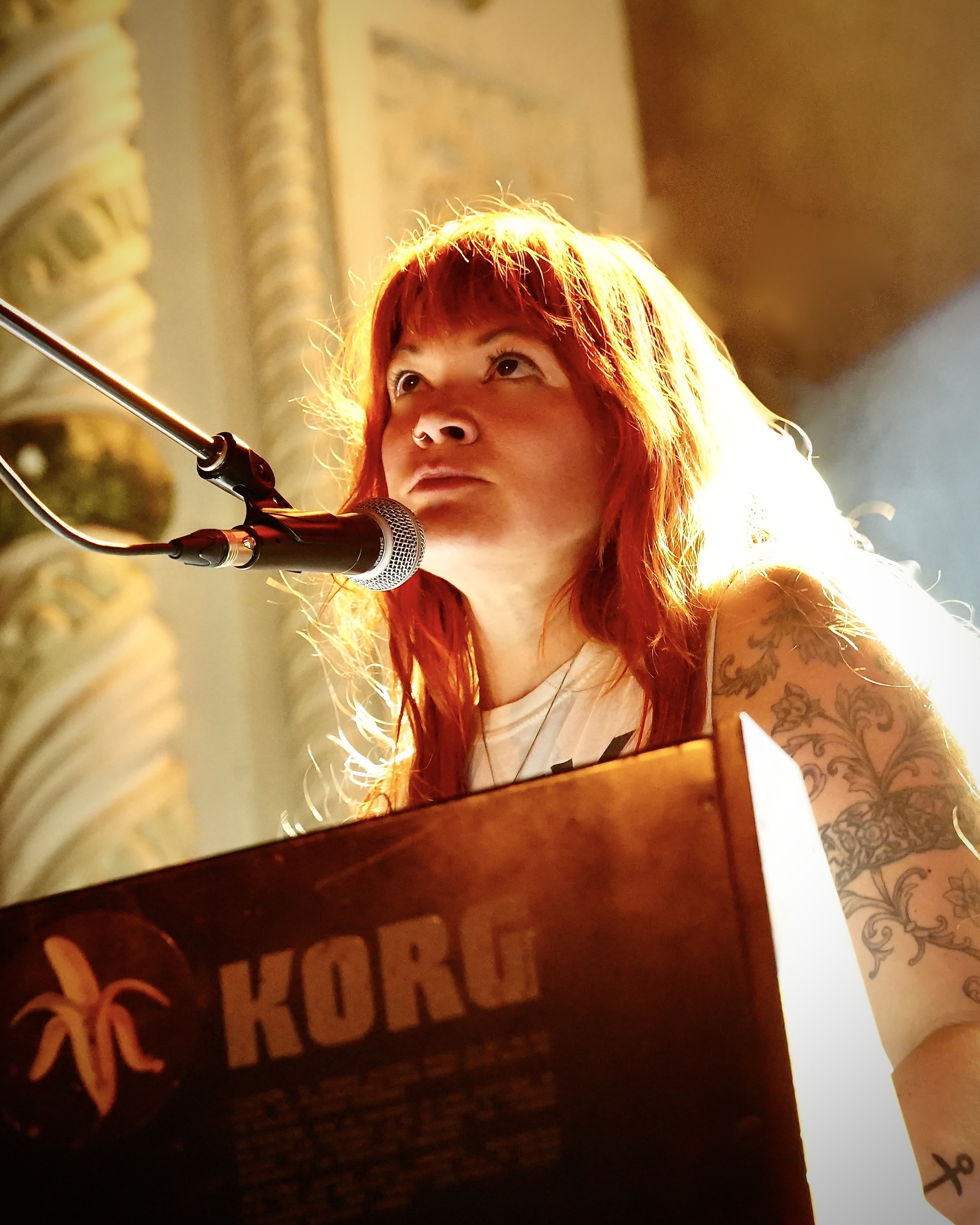
Zia McCabe

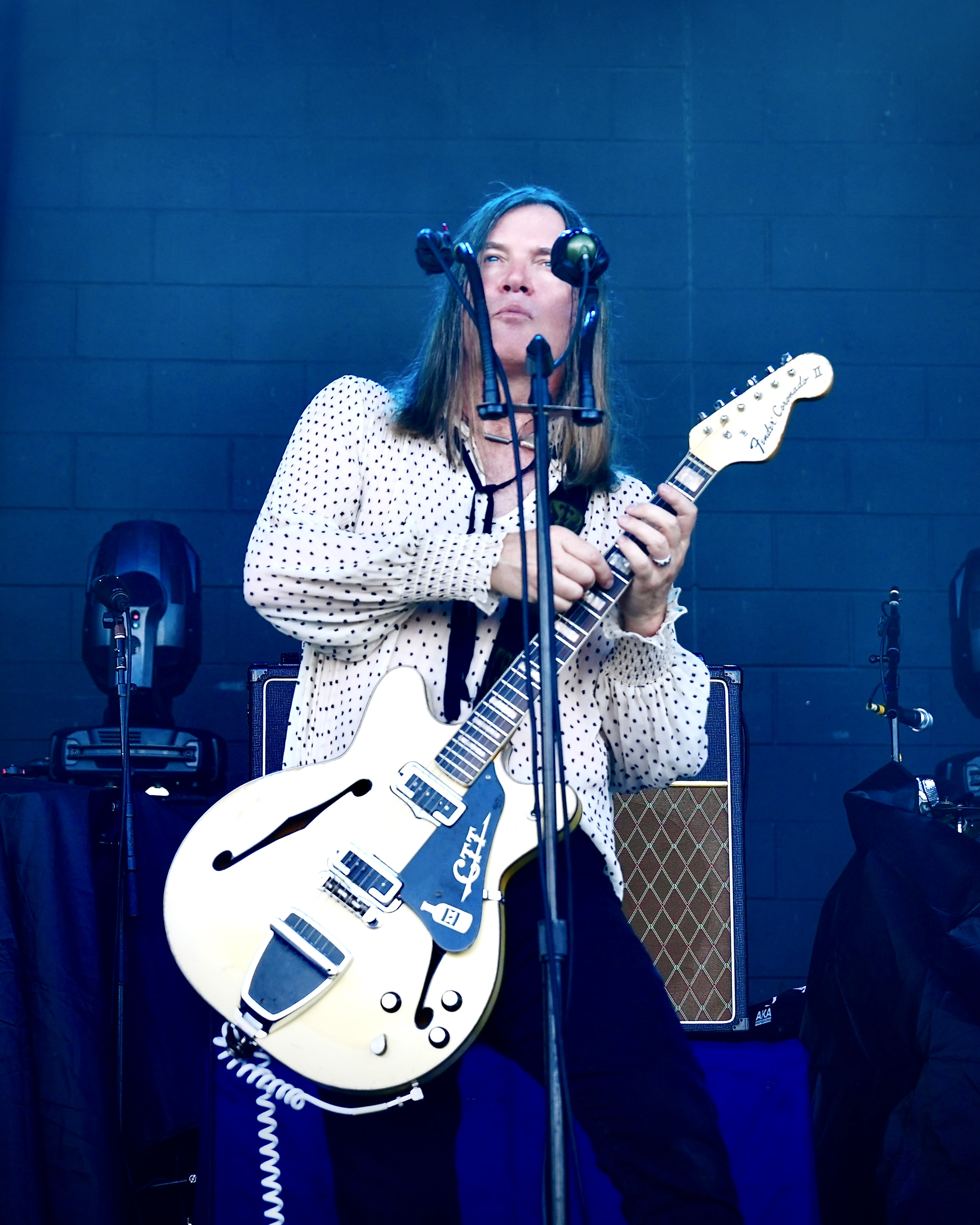
Courtney Taylor-Taylor

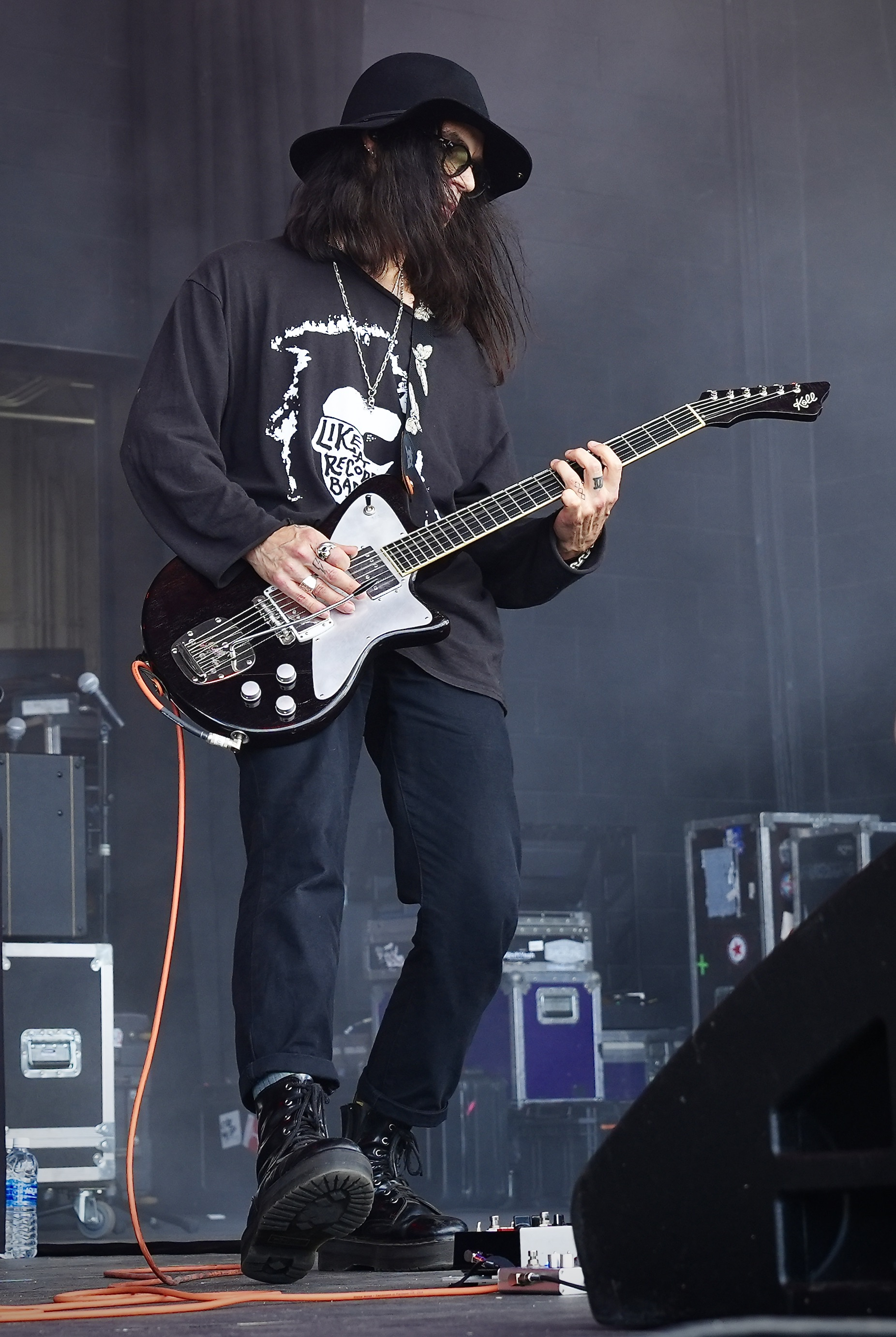
Peter Holmström

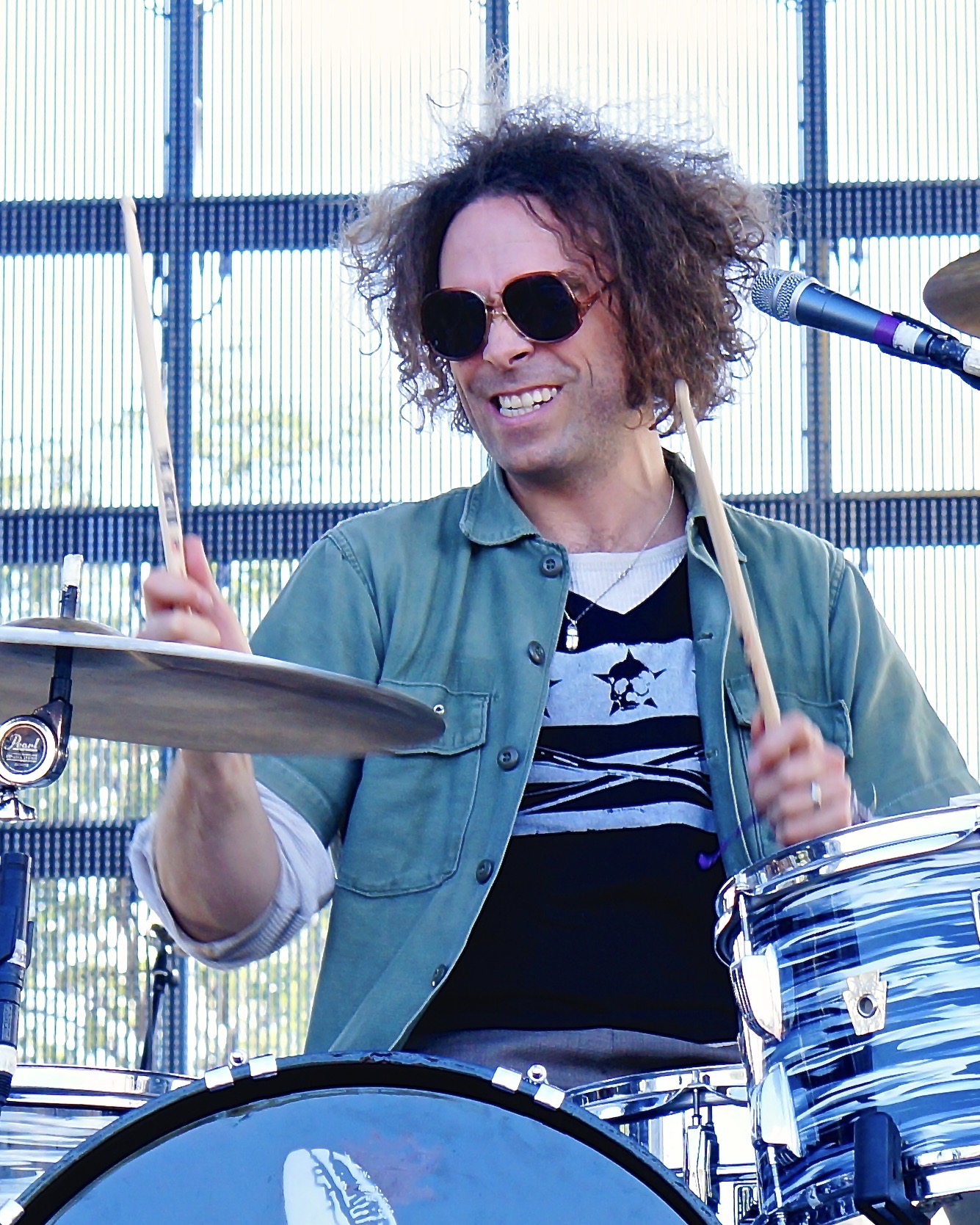
Brent DeBoer

Current members

- Courtney Taylor-Taylor – lead vocals, guitar, keyboards, percussion (1994–present)
- Peter Holmström – guitar, backing vocals, keyboards, occasional bass guitar (1994–present)
- Zia McCabe – keyboards, bass guitar, percussion, backing vocals, occasional guitar (1994–present)
- Brent DeBoer – drums, backing and occasional lead vocals, guitar, occasional bass guitar (1998–present)

Former members

- Eric Hedford – drums, backing vocals (1994–1998)

== Discography ==
- Dandys Rule OK (1995)
- The Dandy Warhols Come Down (1997)
- Thirteen Tales from Urban Bohemia (2000)
- Welcome to the Monkey House (2003)
- The Black Album (1996/2004)
- Odditorium or Warlords of Mars (2005)
- Earth to the Dandy Warhols (2008)
- The Dandy Warhols Are Sound (2002, released 2009)
- This Machine (2012)
- Distortland (2016)
- Why You So Crazy (2019)
- Tafelmuzik Means More When You're Alone (2020)
- Rockmaker (2024)
- Pin Ups (2026)
