= Zia McCabe =

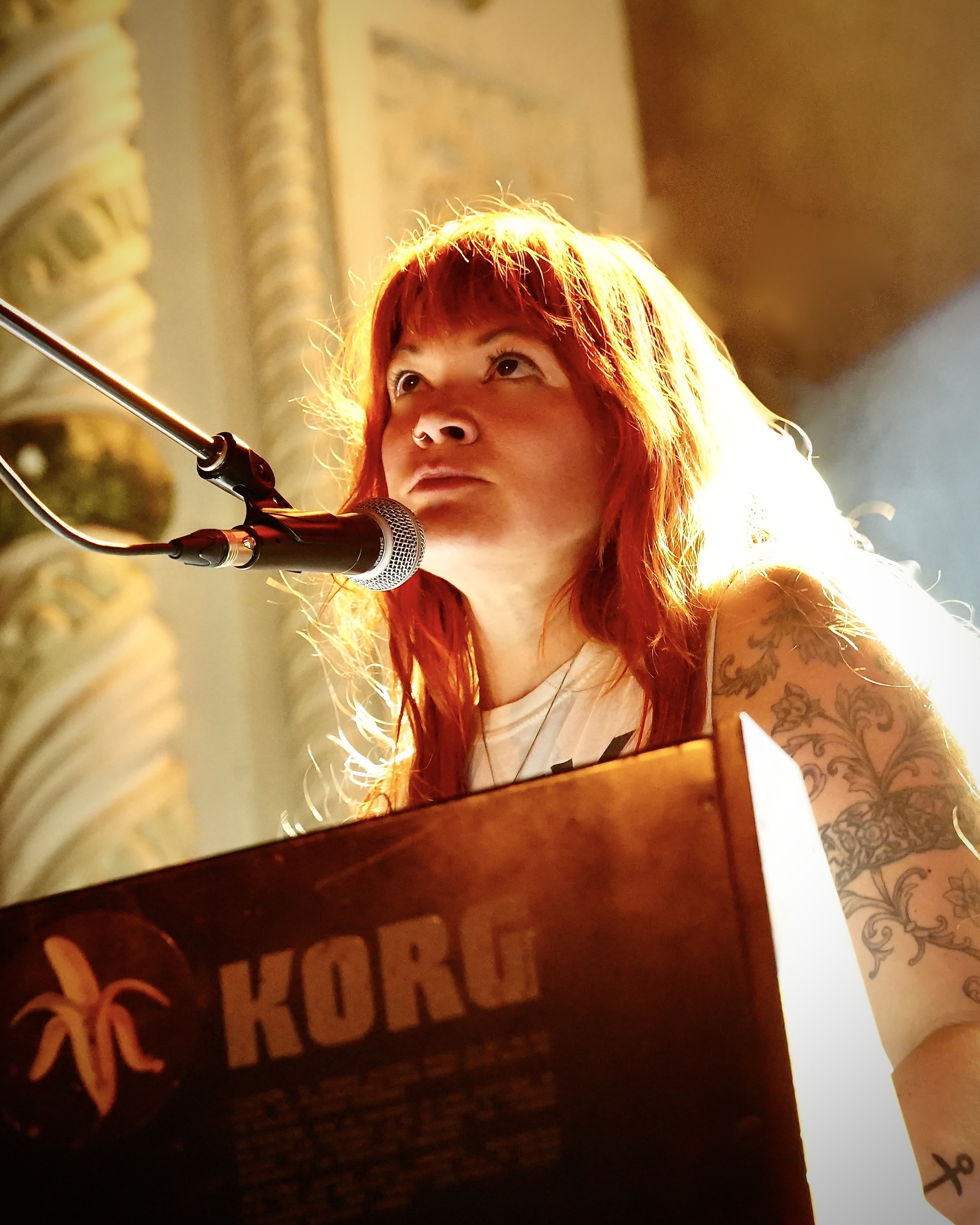
- McCabe performing with The Dandy Warhols at The Metro in Chicago, Illinois in 2024

Background information
- Born: Aimee Springer; June 2, 1975 (age 51)
- Genres: Alternative rock, country
- Instruments: Keyboard, percussion, bass guitar, turntable, vocals
- Years active: 1995–present
- Member of: The Dandy Warhols; Brush Prairie; The Mutants

Zia McCabe (born Aimee Springer; June 2, 1975) is an American musician. She plays keyboards, percussion and bass guitar, and is a member of American alternative rock band The Dandy Warhols. She is also a solo DJ, under the moniker DJ Rescue, and part of a six-piece country music band called Brush Prairie.

== Early life ==
McCabe was raised in a log cabin her father built himself in Battle Ground, Washington. Her father was an autobody worker who fell ill from paint exposure, later becoming an engineer, and her mother was an artist. She had one sister, who also became an artist. She graduated from Battle Ground High School in Battle Ground, Washington in 1993. As a child she was a dancer, but stopped study when further training proved too distant and expensive for her family. In 1995, with hardly any prior musical experience, McCabe joined The Dandy Warhols after a mutual friend told her that bandmate Courtney Taylor-Taylor had an opening for a synth player and was willing to teach her how to play instruments. She had been looking to become a musician, but was disillusioned by the heavy grunge scene that the Pacific Northwest was then known for. She was the youngest band member at 19, and soon after left college to live band life full time.

== Personal life ==
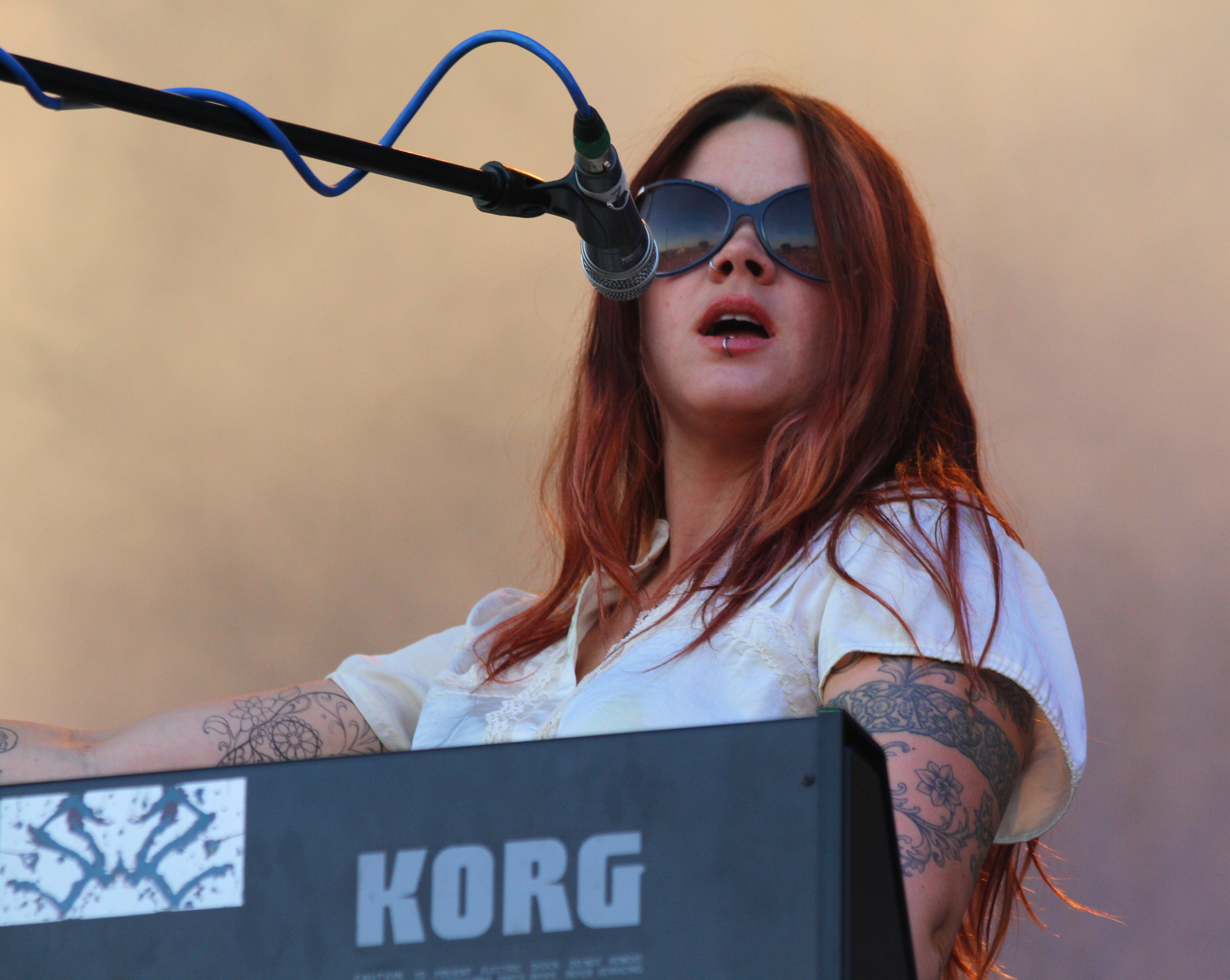
McCabe at the 2012 Frequency Festival

She married Travis Hendricks (The Dandy Warhols tour manager) on 7 October 2001. While pregnant with their daughter Matilda Louise, McCabe continued to perform and record, and managed to complete recording for Odditorium or Warlords of Mars one week away from childbirth. She split with Hendricks in 2011–2012. She is licensed as a realtor/broker in Oregon, and currently works with Living Room Realty in Portland.

In April 2023 McCabe and her daughter were in a car accident. McCabe sustained a concussion.

In 2025, McCabe revealed that she had been diagnosed with autism.

== Political advocacy ==
McCabe has been politically active since at least 2008, engaging with issues from community initiatives to Federal level policy and candidates. She spearheaded community engagement in Portland, Oregon's Clean Water Portland campaign, endorsing Democratic candidate Bernie Sanders for President of the United States in 2016, and 2020, and has been active in supporting and normalizing cannabis usage at the state and federal levels.
