= Peter Holmström =

American rock musician

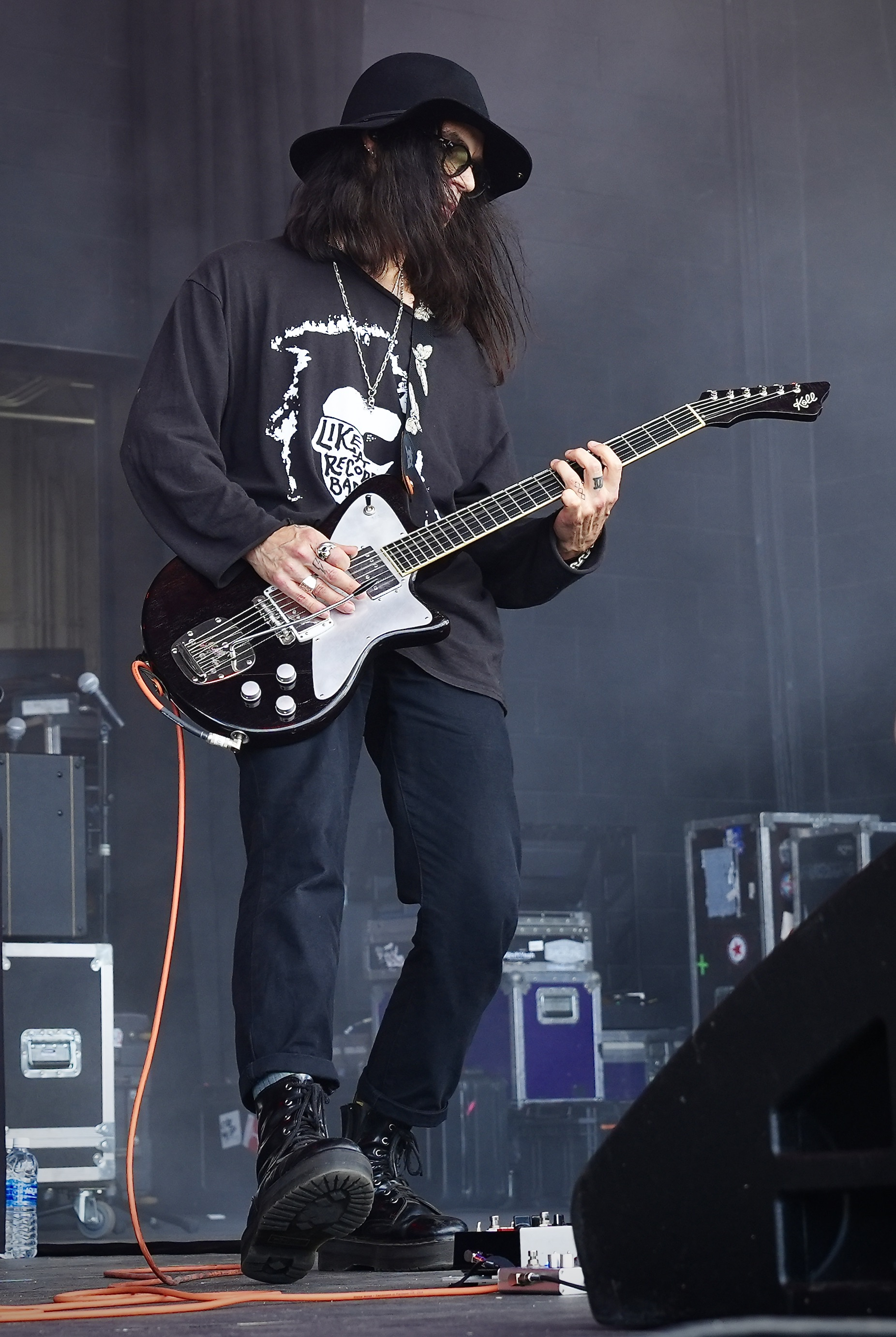
- Holmström performing with The Dandy Warhols at Milwaukee's Summerfest 2024

Background information
- Born: Portland, Oregon, U.S.
- Genres: Alternative rock; neo-psychedelia
- Instruments: Guitar; bass guitar; keyboards
- Member of: The Dandy Warhols; Pete International Airport; Rebel Drones; Radis Noir; The Mutants; Sun Atoms

Peter Holmström is an American rock musician. He is a member of the bands The Dandy Warhols, Pete International Airport, Radis Noir, and Rebel Drones. Holmström's first guitar was a Gibson SG. Holmström is also an amateur photographer, and in the past he has also composed music for his sister's theater group.

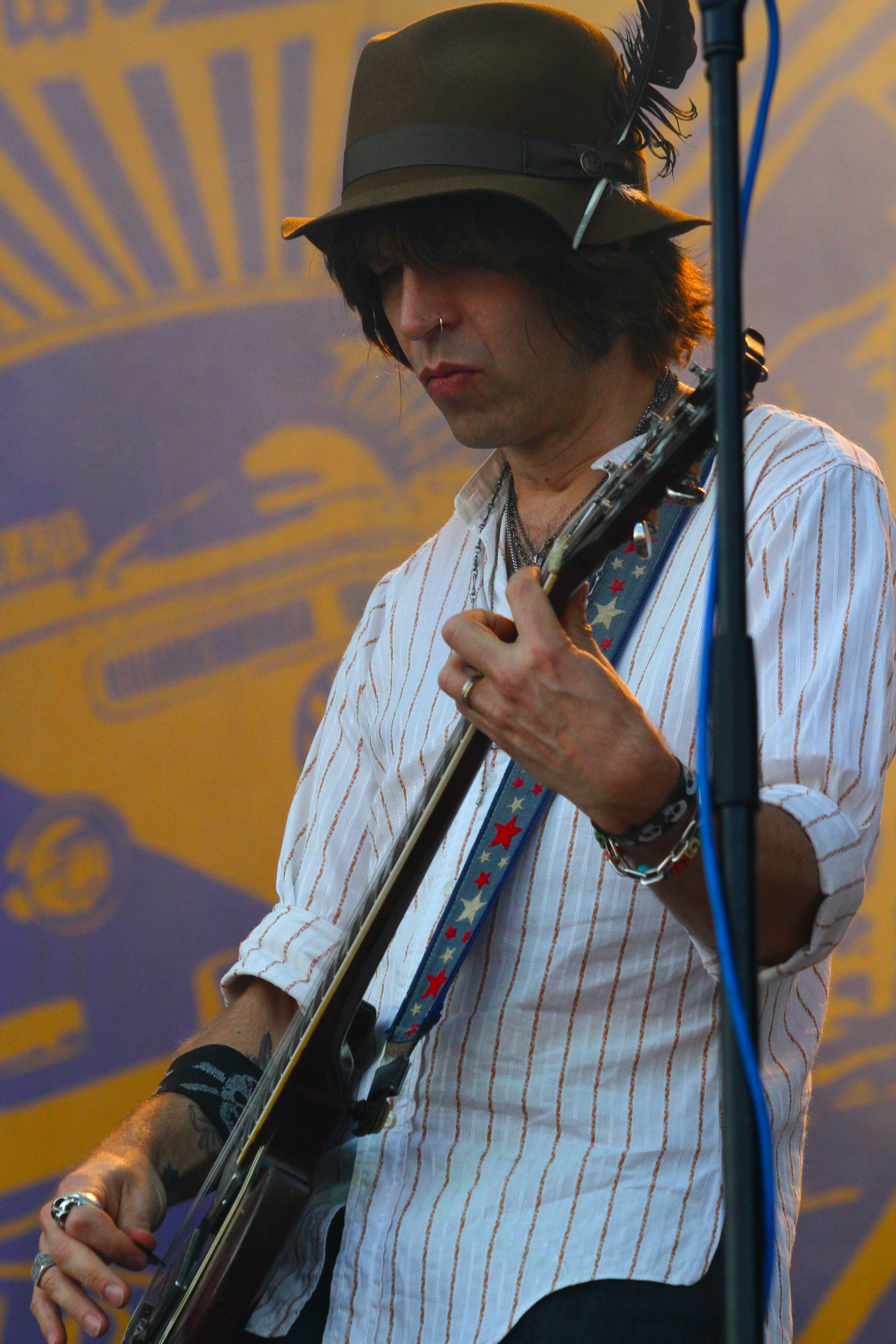
Holmström playing at the 2012 Frequency Festival

== Musical equipment ==
=== Dandy Warhols (2000) gear ===
Guitars

- 1971 Gibson SG with Gibson '57 Pickups
- 1972 Gibson SG
- 1972 Fender Telecaster Thinline with Open G Tuning
- Fender Bass VI tuned A-A
- Tao guitars "air force one" custom made t-bucket model

Pedals

- Boss TU-2 Tuner
- Electro-Harmonix Big Muff Pi
- 2 Vintage Rat Pedals
- DOD Stereo Flanger
- Electro-Harmonix Small Stone
- Boss DM-3 Analog Delay
- Boss PS-3 Pitch Shifter/Delay
- Boss HM-2 Harmonizer
- Ernie Ball Volume
- Boss RV-3 Reverb/Delay
- Boss DM-2 Delay in Wah Wah housing
- Z Vex Seek Wah
- MXR Dyna Comp
- MXR Phase 90
- DOD Envelope Filter
- Boss DD-5 Digital Delay
- Boss PN-2 Tremolo/Panner

Amplifiers

- Two Vox AC-30 re-issue w/ blueback speakers

== Personal life ==
His father, Robert "Bob" Holmström, was an early employee of the Intel Corporation. Holmström attended college in New York City before returning to Portland. Holmström attended Fairfield Grammar School in Bristol, England in the early 1980s.

== Discography ==
As a member of The Dandy Warhols

- The Dandy Warhols discography

As a member of The Great Northwest

- The Widespread Reign Of The Great Northwest (2008)

As a member of Pete International Airport

- Pete International Airport (2010)
- Safer With The Wolves... (2017)
- It Felt Like The End Of The World (2023)

As a member of Rebel Drones

- Songs From a Sonic Land

As a member of The Mutants

- Your Desert My Mind

As a member of Sun Atoms

- Let There Be Light (2021), credits: Producer, Bass
- Everything Forever (2024), credits: Producer, Bass

As a member of Walls Of Dada

- Dada (2017)
- Walls Of Dada 2 (2018)
- Walls Of Dada III (2021)
