= Courtney Taylor-Taylor =

American musician

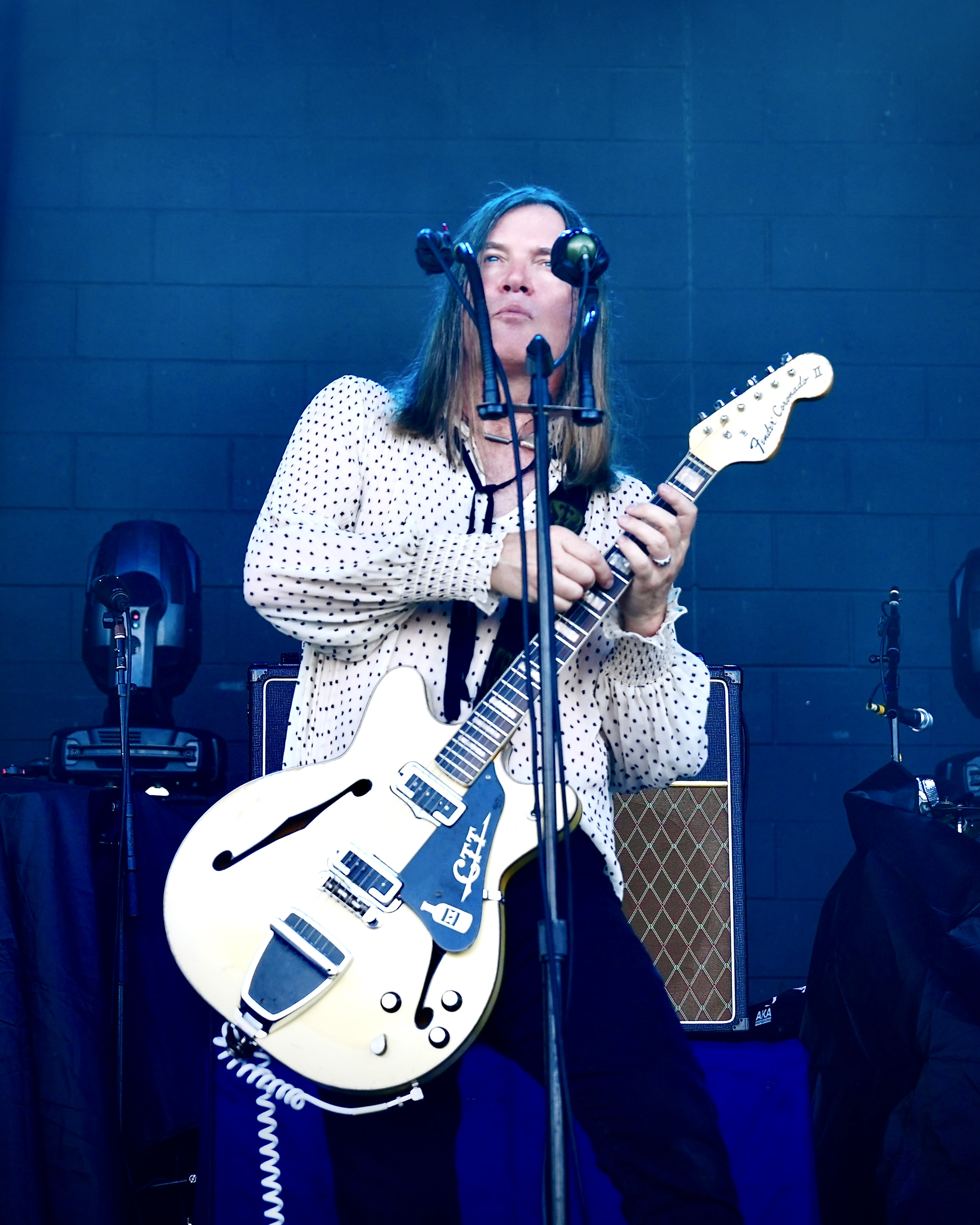
- Courtney Taylor-Taylor in 2024

Background information
- Born: Courtney A. Taylor; July 20, 1967 (age 59); Portland, Oregon, U.S.
- Genre: Alternative rock
- Instruments: Vocals, guitar, keyboards, percussion
- Member of: The Dandy Warhols
- Formerly of: The Beauty Stab; Nero's Rome

Courtney A. Taylor (born July 20, 1967), known as Courtney Taylor-Taylor, is an American singer-songwriter from Portland, Oregon. He is the lead singer and guitarist of alternative rock band the Dandy Warhols, a band he co-founded. Taylor-Taylor has written the majority of the band's songs.

Taylor-Taylor has written a graphic novel titled One Model Nation, about a fictional 1970s German krautrock band. It was released in 2009. This was accompanied by a studio album titled Totalwerks, Vol. 1 (1969–1977), a fake greatest hits album by the fictional band, released in 2012. Although suffering central vision blindness since the mid 1990's, Taylor-Taylor began making One Model Nation into a feature film in 2025 using Ai technology.

== Early life and education ==
Taylor-Taylor attended Sunset High School in Beaverton, a suburb of Portland, and studied sociology, psychology and music at Cascade College, also in Portland. He recalls sticking out as a teenager: "You don't fit in if you're a make-up-wearing weirdo, surrounded by large, clumsy guys and cheerleaders." He found refuge in the work of Friedrich Nietzsche and Kurt Vonnegut. It was there that he met future bandmate Peter Holmström.

After graduating, Taylor-Taylor worked as a mechanic while playing drums for local band Nero's Rome. He was also the drummer in the Portland-based glam rock/pop band the Beauty Stab.

== Career ==
=== Music career ===
Taylor-Taylor appears in and narrates the film Dig!, a documentary chronicling the early years of the relationship between his band, the Dandy Warhols, and the Brian Jonestown Massacre.

=== Non-music career ===
Taylor-Taylor appeared in an episode of the second season of the TV show Veronica Mars, "Cheatty Cheatty Bang Bang", performing the song "Love Hurts". He appeared in the 2009 music documentary film The Heart Is a Drum Machine, as well as a 2011 episode of the Australian music quiz television show Spicks and Specks.

Taylor-Taylor was one of the contributors to the book Sex Tips from Rock Stars by Paul Miles, published by Omnibus Press in July 2010.

Taylor-Taylor is also the co-host of the podcast, Deep Dive: Wine Acoustics.

== Personal life ==
Like his cousin and bandmate Brent DeBoer, Taylor-Taylor is of Dutch ancestry.

As the chief songwriter for "Bohemian Like You", Taylor-Taylor received approximately 1.5 million US dollars in royalties for Vodafone's use of the song in television commercials in the telecommunications company's native United Kingdom (and other territories Vodafone operate in, including Australia and Greece) in late 2001. With part of these earnings, he purchased a quarter of a city block in Portland and turned it into a complex with space for recording, film editing, and web design.

On December 22, 2007, Taylor-Taylor married long-time girlfriend Lockett Allbritton at the Columbia Gorge Hotel in Hood River, Oregon. Lockett Taylor is a yoga practitioner and instructor. On February 1, 2010, she gave birth to their first child, a son.

Taylor-Taylor has expressed a dislike of politics. After then-UK Home Secretary Theresa May exited a stage to the accompaniment of "Bohemian Like You", Taylor-Taylor was incensed. He said "I tend to really dislike any people who take sides in politics. It is the single greatest contributor to getting nothing done. Fuck 'politics'. What a joke."
