= Collin Hegna =

American musician

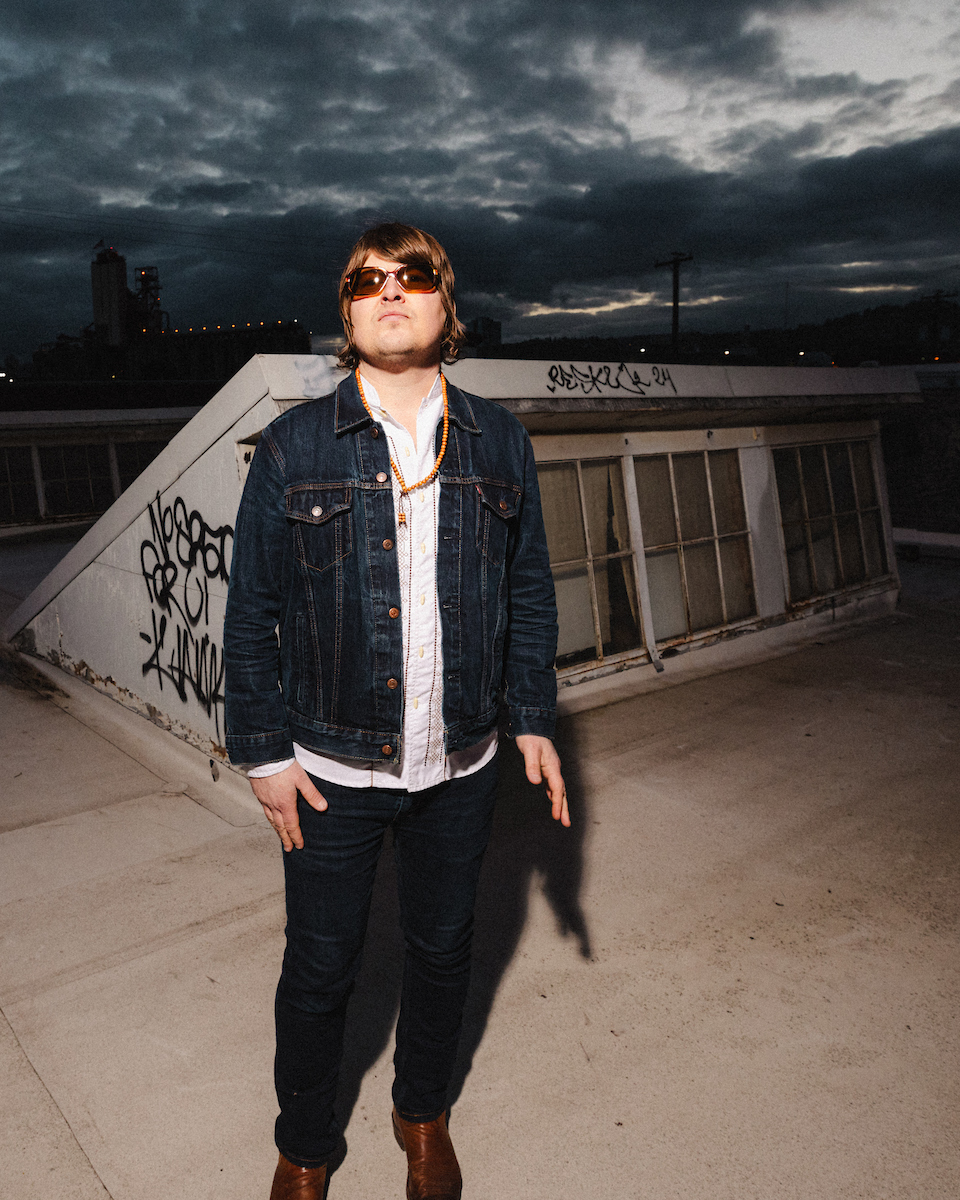

Background information
- Born: Collin Kendrick Hegna; October 9, 1978 (age 48); Portland, Oregon, U.S.
- Genres: Spaghetti Western; Garage; Psychedelic rock; Shoegaze
- Occupations: Composer; Producer; Musician; Songwriter
- Instruments: Bass; Drums; Guitar; Vocals; Whistling
- Years active: 2001-present
- Labels: Revolver; A Records; Jealous Butcher
- Member of: Federale; Brian Jonestown Massacre
- Website: collinhegna.com

Collin Hegna is a Portland, Oregon-based musician, composer, and recording engineer. Hegna founded the Spaghetti Western–themed indie rock combo Federale and remains their principal songwriter. In addition, he has played bass with The Brian Jonestown Massacre since 2004.

As co-owner of SE Portland's Revolver Studios, Hegna has produced releases from Joel Gion, Matthew J. Tow, and David J. He has also served as engineer for artists and events ranging from acclaimed neo-psychedelia acts The Quarter After and The Richmond Sluts to exurban roots festival Pickathon.

His songs, both with and without instrumentation by Federale, have appeared on a variety of film and television soundtracks including The Bad Batch, The Lego Movie, and Breakthrough. He oversaw the music for the Emmy-nominated Super Bowl commercial "Halftime in America".

== Early life ==
Collin Kendrick Hegna was born in Portland, Oregon on October 9th, 1978. He spent much of his youth outdoors around the state's varied natural environments – the high desert, trout creeks, his grandfather's farm – and has said that upbringing helped instill an appreciation for the romanticism of the west. His dad was a musician, a drum player, and as a kid, Hegna learned violin, piano, and stand-up bass and would originally play jazz and classical music before being inspired by The Beatles. Around this time as a boy, he also developed skills in both singing and whistling. As a teenager, Hegna attended Beaverton High School in Beaverton, Oregon, where he played bass in the jazz band and choir. His father, Gailen Hegna, has owned and operated Rainbow Recording Studio for more than 30 years.

Gailen served as mixer and engineer on recordings for a variety of Portland-area acts including jazz bassist David Jay White, Christian metallers Godspeed, Susan and the Surftones, and 90s Caleb Klauder/Jenny Conlee band Calobo. He also provided additional engineering on the third album (The Blood Flowed Like Wine) of Collin's band Federale.

From 1996 to 2001, Hegna attended the University of Oregon's School of Music and Dance for Jazz. His studies included Electronic Composition within the Future Music Oregon program, and he graduated with a Bachelor of Science in Music Technology.

While still attending school, Hegna began playing bass for Cocaine Unicorn, a tambourine-spiked retro-chic combo formed by singer/songwriter Paul Burkhart whose membership included Carl Werner, Dasa Kalstrom, and Ryan Sumner. Willamette Week described their sound as "swagger-heavy Anglophile pop ... ready to ride the garage wave straight to the Strokes' sex, drugs and rock-'n'-roll after-party."

After two years in Eugene, during which Burkhart complained the act was labeled "a fashion band", they relocated to Portland and attracted strong local buzz, though intra-band strife would eventually end the group before they could record a proper album. The Pains of Being Pure at Heart founder Kip Berman was a friend of Burkhart's and wrote the song "Hey Paul", off of their self-titled debut album, as an "homage" to Cocaine Unicorn.

=== Brian Jonestown Massacre ===
Since 2004, Hegna has played bass for critically acclaimed psych-rock act the Brian Jonestown Massacre. The band, which gained an unexpected mainstream notoriety following the release of Sundance-Grand-Jury-award-winning documentary Dig, endured regular changes of membership under the volatile leadership of founding singer-songwriter Anton Newcombe.

Following the resignation of his band's drummer and bassist, Newcombe posted a note on then-popular social media site Friendster seeking replacements. Cocaine Unicorn drummer Ryan Sumner responded volunteering himself and Hegna for the positions, and the pair drove to Los Angeles for auditions. Though the original drummer ended up returning, Hegna soon became an integral member of their rotating "rogues' gallery of past lineups and psychedelic standard-bearers".

He would accompany the band across the globe and play a key role in their performances. Even at the height of BJM extravagance, when their live sets swelled to include four or five guitars, critics praised "Hegna's tight rhythm work" as an indispensable grounding element. Once the group scaled back their touring personnel, Hegna's presence served as an increasingly important component as the line-up became, in Newcombe's words, "much cleaner and defined".

Nevertheless, though he has longest continuous tenure with the band of any current BJM member, performances remains fraught with tension. On-stage strife between Newcombe and Hegna nearly ended a June 2018 concert in Brisbane Australia.

=== Other bands ===
While Federale and Brian Jonestown remained his primary groups, Hegna would occasionally lend his talents to high-profile side-projects launched by established artists. In 2010, when Dandy Warhols' founding member Peter Holmström first assembled his psych-rock quintet Pete International Airport, Hegna added "whistling" to the self-titled debut and bass on tour. Austinist thought "their straightforward '70s revivalist sound strikes comparisons to The Doors as ... Collin Hegna's distorted bass lines float through the air."

Hegna would also join a group formed by longtime BJM mainstay/The Out Crowd founder Matt Hollywood. Staffed by musicians with ties to Brian Jonestown or similarly celebrated NW-adjacent psych-garage sensations, Rebel Drones brought together bassist Hegna, guitarist Holmstrom, multi-instrumentalist William (Grails) Slater, and drummer Jason (The Warlocks) Anchondo around frontman Hollywood.

Given the star-studded roster's pre-existing obligations, the supergroup proved short-lived. Members inevitably drifted back toward their own projects, and, as Hollywood would later explain, Rebel Drones "lost momentum. Everybody in the band had a lot of other things going on, and, eventually, it just ... wasn't a priority."

During Drones' brief mid-2000s tenure, the act did enter Hegna's Revolver studio to lay down material for a potential album. Writing of the "nearly forgotten recordings" almost a decade later, the Phoenix New Times found "its drone ... delicious and mind-expanding."

Although never officially put out, the tracks slowly gathered an online following among the BJM faithful and fans of Hollywood's solo work. One song entitled "Drugs" has received more than 100K plays on YouTube since it was first uploaded (without corresponding video) seven years ago. Finally, in the summer of 2018, former members announced that Cardinal Fuzz Records would release both digital and (Double LP) vinyl editions of the Rebel Drones sessions entitled Abusing The System.

== Federale ==
Along with former Cocaine Unicorn members Werner, Kalstrom, and Sumner, Hegna formed Federale in 2005. The band became known for creating evocative, almost-entirely instrumental tunes similar to cinematic scores, which the Seattle Weekly found deserving of comparison to "Goblin, Ennio Morricone and Angelo Badalamenti for a sweeping nod to soundtracks of the past". The AV Club noted that "Federale specializes in making soundtrack music for films that don't exist yet, using pedal steel, trumpets, whistling, and all the other orchestral flourishes associated with Italian cinema of the '60s and '70s."

Sumner, the drummer credited with originating their cinematic approach, died from a blood clot to the heart during the band's first year. Werner and Kalstrom eventually moved on to other projects as various Portland-area musicians joined the rotating line-up around Hegna. Due to the number of people who contributed to the album, Hegna said at the time that he considered the endeavor "primarily a studio project" and that he had no ambitions of touring the band.

Federale's current line-up includes Rick Pedrosa, Nalin Silva, classical soprano Maria Karlin, orchestral percussionist Brian Gardiner, Colin Sheridan (The High Violets), and Sebastian Bibb-Barrett (The Builders and the Butchers).

=== La Rayar: A Tale of Revenge ===
After playing together for three years, Federale recorded their debut LP La Rayar: A Tale of Revenge, a song-cycle based around the story of an ordinary man (Santiago) spurred toward acts of violence following the slaughter of his family by a Native American tribe. To help convey the underlying storyline, bits of narration were inserted within the otherwise instrumental album. "We'll come up with a story line and a cast of characters [and] write a theme for each character," Hegna explained. "The different themes and songs tell the story."

Marveling at the seriousness with which Federale embraced Spaghetti Western soundscapes, the Portland Mercury advised listeners to "let the whistled melodies, wooden flutes, rattling snare drums, twangy guitars, and trumpets pour in."

"It's the music to a movie we conceptualized," Hegna said about the record. "The movie doesn't actually exist, [but] each character in ‘the movie’ has a theme and the various themes ... are developed and recur through various permutations as the events change and as the characters are affected by what happens in the story."

=== Devil in a Boot ===
In 2009, Federale put out their second album, Devil in a Boot. The band recorded half of the tracks in Hegna's Revolver Studios while utilizing the organic reverb of a vacant Masonic temple for the remainder. As with their debut, the LP's overarching concept focuses upon an average man driven by horrific tragedy to wreak vengeance against the railroad baron who stole his home, murdered his loved ones, and left the protagonist entombed in a shallow grave.

"The themes of classic westerns are all there in the totalities and timbres," wrote Josiah Mankovsky for The Dropout, "solitude and pain, shootouts and feuds, long dusty rides and revenge." Acknowledging the band's debt to Morricone, the Portland Mercury further noted that Federale were "respectful in their path, crafting a graceful and stylistic sound that sprawls out as a soundtrack to some hidden western cinematic gem."

In 2011, a promotional EP featuring three songs from the album alongside the unreleased track "Sarcophagus" was sent out with deliveries by Portland's Lonesome Pizza.

=== The Blood Flowed Like Wine ===
By the release of their third full-length, The Blood Flowed Like Wine, Federale songs had already been licensed by various television shows and commercials broadcast nationwide, but opportunities for scoring a nationally released motion picture had thus far eluded them. ("Django", the sixth track on the album, was originally written in hopes of potential use by Quentin Taurantino for his then-in-production feature Django Unchained.)

To that end, though an interior plot does link much of The Blood Flowed Like Wine, the storyline is not highlighted with the prominence of their earlier works, and there is no explanatory libretto or narration. As well, the music expands the Federale sound beyond the Spaghetti Western-replicating tropes of past albums. Most notably, the group invited KP (Spindrift) Thomas and Alex (Black Angels) Maas to contribute vocals to tracks that formerly would have been instrumental.

In contrast with the more collaborative process of past recordings, Hegna largely composed the songs himself by crafting a digital simulation of each part before arranging full orchestration with the Federale regulars, augmented by members of the 45th Parallel chamber ensemble, pedal steel guitarist Paul (Richmond Fontaine, The Decemberists) Brainard, and members of the Oregon Symphony. The Portland Mercury noted approvingly that "Federale has expanded to include strings, horns, and a much richer, more orchestral foundation."

Writing for the Oregonian, Jason Simms found that the band's familiar backdrops were now laced with Middle Eastern-tinged accents, and praised the "mystical, desert feel that ties it all together."

=== All the Colours of the Dark ===
Although Federale had returned to the studio to begin recording new material in the summer of 2013, it would be another four years before their next release. By this time, Hegna had led the act into regular licensing opportunities for television shows and commercials, and his continually expanding vision for the project made All the Colours of the Dark a significant departure from their previous blueprint.

Noting that All the Colours of the Dark was Federale's "least instrumental release to date", the Portland Mercury's reviewer appreciated that "this shift broadens the potential directions for the band... but also places new emphasis on lyrics, which – at least for right now – are not Federale's strong suit."

The A.V. Club, conversely, looked fondly on the band's progression "into pop songwriting, giving you all the emotion of an Ennio Morricone instrumental track with... go-go appeal." In a view that perhaps best summarized the critical consensus, Victoria Segal's three-star review for Mojo acknowledged that "All the Colours of the Dark doesn't lack for skills or high drama," but she nevertheless decided the band "can't quite shake off a dust cloud of gimmickry." If the foundation of their music remained "reverb guitar ... and classic gothic whistling", Federale continued to broaden their sonic palate.

Preparing for their first major West Coast tour in the fall of 2016, Hegna made a point of showcasing "quite a few instruments on stage that you don't generally see in a rock band setting – pedal steel, whistling, trumpet, operatic vocals, and an army of percussion instruments. We’ve arranged all these songs so that parts interweave and pop in and out of the sonic forefront [for] a pretty immersive live music experience."

== Soundtracks ==
From the outset, Hegna had been clear about his intentions to create musical accompaniments for motion pictures. "You can express yourself more articulately in the context of a film," he told Willamette Week in 2009. "[It's] a really powerful way to convey emotions."

One year earlier, Federale had contributed the score for Portland-based filmmaker Todd E Freeman's indie thriller Pray For Hell. Although that would be Hegna's most extensive cinematic effort for some time, his band continued to appear on various film and television soundtracks including 2014 blockbuster The Lego Movie. "War Cry", by Hegna and bandmate Carl Werner, can be heard as the film's main protagonist Emmet plummets into an Old West-themed area. Oregon Public Broadcasting deemed the resulting musical flourish "a brief, but notable nod to Federale's signature sound."

=== "Halftime in America" ===
Arguably his greatest soundtrack success came producing and engineering the music for breakout Super Bowl commercial "Halftime in America". Written by Tin House poetry editor Matthew Dickman and directed by David Gordon Green, the 2012 Wieden+Kennedy ad for Chrysler was broadcast during Super Bowl XLVI, which was at the time the most-watched program in the history of American television, with an estimated viewership above 111 million.

Portland multi-instrumentalist Alison Ables composed the music. Lydia Van Dreel, associate professor at the University of Oregon's School of Music and Dance, played the French horn during recording sessions at Hegna's Revolver Studios. The spot was nominated for a Primetime Emmy Award for Outstanding Commercial, and received praise from Ad Week as "the one Super Bowl ad that dared to go beyond advertising and join a larger national conversation... with muscle and style."

In the two-minute piece, voiceover narration from Clint Eastwood conveys a stirring account of the United States car industry's bounce back after prolonged recessionary struggles. Set against a monochromatic clip montage of average citizens on the job, an elegiac backdrop of organ and horns plays throughout. As one journal described, "its quietness evolves into a crescendo as the narrative of the story reaches its climax."

The piece was singled out for acclaim by The New Yorker classical music columnist Alex Ross. Writing for his personal website, he explained that he was "pulled in not only by the rasp of Clint Eastwood's voice but also by the intriguingly dour score, which avoids the ersatz Coplandisms you might expect in this context... It reminds me a little of Jóhann Jóhannsson's music for The Miners' Hymns."

The following year, Hegna co-founded Perfect Prescription Sound, a Portland company specializing in composing music for advertising, film, and television. Their clients have included Nike, Adidas, Rockport, Isaac Mizrahi, and the New York Yankees.

=== A Girl Walks Home Alone at Night ===
In 2013, Hegna met Ana Lily Amirpour following a Brian Jonestown Massacre gig just after the young writer-director had finished the script for her feature debut, A Girl Walks Home Alone at Night. As she described her plans for the "Iranian vampire Western", he explained the music of Federale, and they agreed to collaborate on the upcoming film.

"When I heard that music," Amirpour said, "I knew it was the musical spine of the film. I knew certain sequences were going to be built around those pieces of music; it's almost like scoring the film to the music and not the other way around."

After premiering at the 2014 Sundance Festival, A Girl Walks Home Alone At Night was released nationally in November of that year to rave reviews. Several critics praised Armipour's choice of emotionally charged musical selections. "The soundtrack to A Girl Walks Home Alone at Night is one of the best in recent memory," wrote Kaleen Aftab for The Independent, "[and] at its heart are the Spaghetti Western-inspired sounds of Federale, the side project of Collin Hegna."

In all, Federale contributed five of the 17 songs used. Death Waltz, a niche imprint specializing in soundtracks, would release a double LP featuring music and dialogue from the film. The album was launched with a party at South by Southwest that featured a Federale concert and DJ set from Elijah Wood.

== The Bad Batch ==
For Amirpour's sophomore effort The Bad Batch, Hegna contributed the title track of Federale's fourth album, All The Colours Of The Dark – a "scorched-country duet", as Willamette Week wrote, that finds the vocal pairing of Hegna and bandmate Maria Karlin approximating "a reverse-engineered Lee Hazlewood and Nancy Sinatra." The song so successfully echoed a vintage aesthetic that Katie Rife, in her review of the film for the A.V. Club, mentioned erroneously that the ballad in question "was the theme song to the 1972 giallo film All The Colors Of The Dark—it really sounds like a relic of the era, to be fair ..."

While critical response to The Bad Batch ended up more mixed than with Amirpour's debut, reviewers once again highlighted its soundtrack – "the sharpest tool in the movie's arsenal," in the words of the Hollywood Reporter – as did advertising campaigns promoting the film. In that vein, a well-publicized video for All the Colours of the Dark containing Bad Batch footage was released one day before its theatrical debut, alongside images of the soundtrack's cover artwork.

That same year, Hegna again aided Amirpour by composing the music for her "Curing Cancer" episode of the National Geographic anthology series Breakthrough.

== Revolver Studio ==
In 2003, Hegna opened Revolver Studios with Federale guitarist Nalin Silva above downtown Portland bar Kelly's Olympian, where Silva serves as booker and venue manager. The pair would relocate the studio to its current SE Portland locale three years later. The studio features a 600-square-foot tracking room, control room, two isolation booths, and an extensive collection of analog and digital recording equipment.

Miracle Falls, the shoegaze project of Paul Dillon (former member of Mercury Rev, Longwave (band), Sparklehorse) and Jason "Plucky" Anchondo (The Warlocks, Spindrift), recorded their self-titled debut at Revolver. In interviews, Dillon has stated that he came to Portland specifically for the studio, and was enthusiastic with his praise. "Revolver is the perfect studio for me really. It's in a beautiful old building [that] has a big, live room with high ceilings, old hardwood floors, and natural light during the day, which helps avoid the dissociative 'bunker effect' that can sometimes happen when you're recording."

For the Shivas 2012 LP Whiteout, the PDX combo's third album and first on K Records, Hegna live-tracked the recordings on two-inch tape to best approximate the feel of a performance. He recorded, co-produced, and contributed vocals for Matthew J. Tow's 2013 solo debut, The Way of Things. The next year, Royston Vasie recorded their sophomore album Water Colours at Revolver during a five-day session helmed by Hegna.

After an extended preparation for Habitual Love Song in his own basement studio, the third album from his Sons of Anarchy-feted folk-rock project Battleme, Matt Brenik came to Revolver with 20 demos. Although he had originally written the songs as piano ballads, he found they were energized in the process of recording with a full band, which included Hegna as bassist for the track "Post Is Dead". "I don't think the song would be the same without that monster bass riff," Brenik told Paste magazine. "On the first record, there were only two players... this one was much more of a family affair."

Joel Gion, another longtime Brian Jonestown Massacre member, referred to Hegna as his primary collaborator during the creation of his self-titled 2017 release. "After listening to me talk about starting to write new songs, Collin offered me free studio time at his studio in Portland," Gion said. "Then it suddenly became real before I even knew I was going to be able to do it."

Jsun Atoms was similarly effusive when discussing the producer with the press. "Collin's Revolver Studios is perfect," Atoms told the Britpop News. “I’ve done a lot of work there the last few years.” "Collin Hegna is outright gifted," he continued. "To get to work with those guys, I'm pinching myself each time ... Having them both as friends that I can bounce ideas off of or collaborate with makes me feel like the luckiest guy in the world." In 2010, The Upsidedown frontman went to Revolver to record that act's third full release, The Town with Bad Wiring. Hegna engineered the star-studded album whose guests included R.E.M.'s Peter Buck. Four years later, Atoms returned to the studio for subsequent band Daydream Machine's debut LP Twin Idols, on which Hegna played piano.

In 2023 Hegna worked with the Portland based band, Roselit Bone, on their album "Ofrenda". He co-produced the song "Cryin' in the USA" with Charlotte McCaslin and engineered the album at Sleepers Mountain and Supernatural Sound. Hegna and McCaslin also mixed the album at Revolver Studios.

Hegna also produced the album for Portland Cowpunk band, Jenny Don't and the Spurs titled "Broken Hearted Blue".

.

=== "The Day That David Bowie Died" ===
West Coast indie-rock contemporaries of Federale comprised the majority of Revolver's early clients, but the highest-profile release associated with the studio came from a British modern rock legend spurred by tragic circumstances toward an impromptu recording session. Shortly after sharing a bill with Federale during the northwest leg of his winter 2016 tour, modern rocker David J (Bauhaus, Love & Rockets) happened to be in Portland when he heard the news of David Bowie's 10 January demise. Within 24 hours, he contacted Hegna about using Revolver Studios to record "The Day That David Bowie Died".

Beyond serving as producer and engineer, Hegna was also tasked with finding a set of studio musicians who could play their parts without preparation or notice. He enlisted members of Federale along with Paul Dillon and Dandy Warhols' touring guitarist Nathan Junior. Hegna would send a demo along to Anton Newcombe, who released it later that year on his own A Records label. The ten-inch debuted at number four on the British vinyl singles chart.

It also appears as the first track of J's 2017 double album Vagabond Songs, and David J often cited the recording of that song as a signal inspiration during interviews. "It was very pure and spontaneous," he told Creative Loafing. "The musicians just heard the song once and did their part [on the] first take ... it was a very poignant, sad, but joyous – tears on the playback – beautiful session."
