= Lollipop Shoppe =

Defunct music venue, bar, and restaurant in Portland, Oregon, U.S.

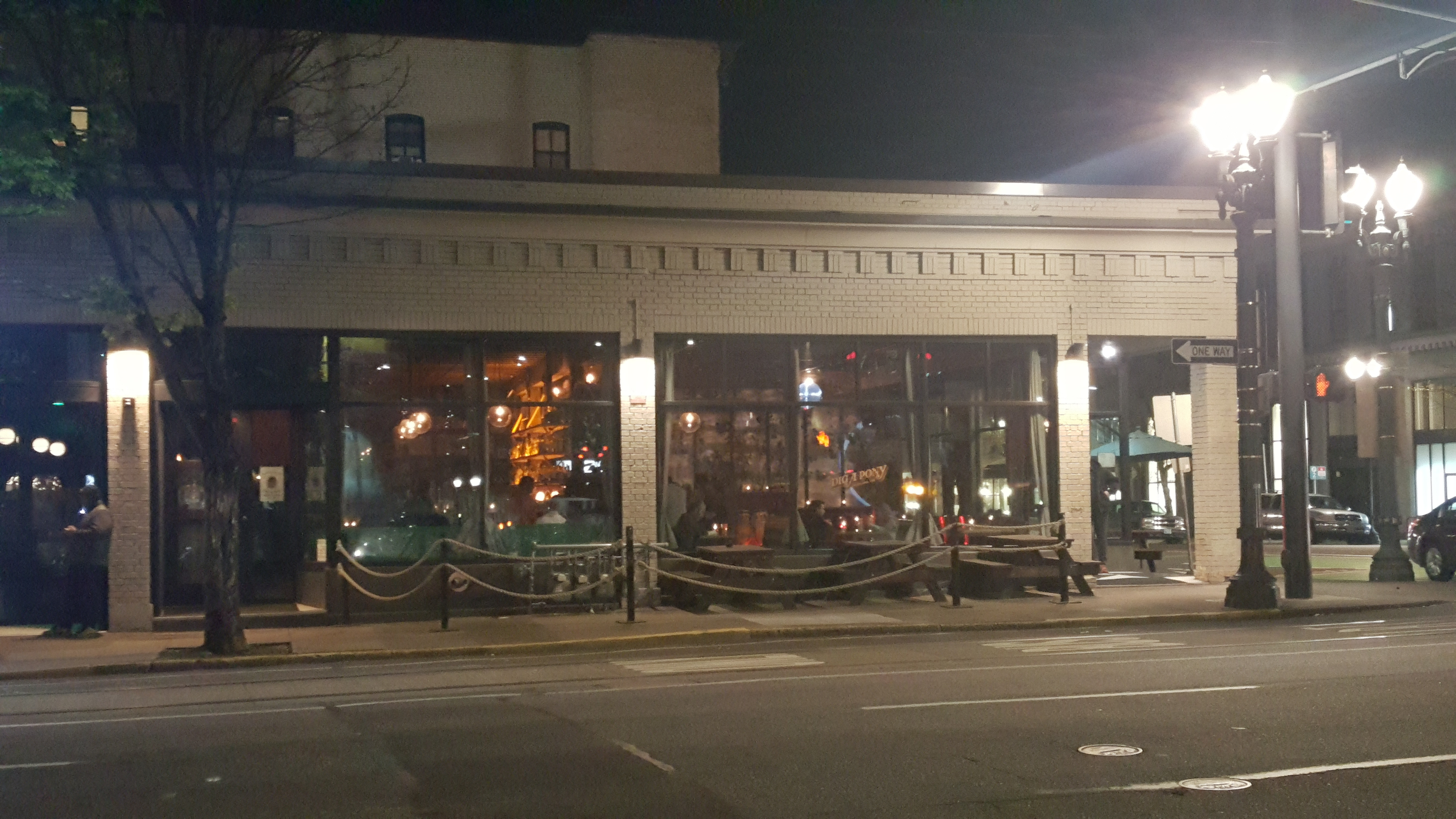
- Lollipop Shoppe operated in the space that previously housed Dig a Pony (exterior pictured at night in 2022)
- Interactive map of Lollipop Shoppe

Restaurant information
- Established: October 28, 2022
- Closed: November 28, 2025
- Owners: Elizabeth Elder; Devon Treadwell; Tyler Treadwell; Bryan Wollen
- Chef: Nick Seabergh
- Food type: Cajun; Creole
- Location: 736 Southeast Grand Avenue, Portland, Multnomah, Oregon, 97214, United States
- Coordinates: 45.5174°N 122.6605°W
- Seating capacity: 200
- Website: web.archive.org/web/20250325171006/https://www.lollipopshoppe.com/

Lollipop Shoppe was a music venue, bar, and restaurant in Portland, Oregon, United States. Named after the American garage rock band The Lollipop Shoppe, the venue opened in October 2022 in the space that had previously housed Dig a Pony in southeast Portland's Buckman neighborhood. It hosted concerts, dance parties, and other events, and served Cajun and Creole cuisine, including po'boys, popcorn shrimp, loaded fries, coleslaw, gumbo, and red beans and rice. In 2025, Lollipop Shoppe launched an unsuccessful fundraising campaign to continue operating. Despite garnering a positive reception for its approachable and diverse programming, the venue closed permanently in November 2025.

== Description ==
The music venue, bar, and restaurant Lollipop Shoppe operated on Grand Avenue at the intersection with Morrison Street in southeast Portland's Buckman neighborhood. Named after the American garage rock band The Lollipop Shoppe, the venue had a small stage and a capacity of 200 people, as well as paintings by Samuel Farrell along a wall with booths and custom mosaic tiles installed by Nicky Kriara.

Brooke Jackson-Glidden of Eater Portland said the venue's acts were "more art-punk-esque", with some being "closer to synth pop". The website's Jenni Moore said the venue had a music calendar with "consistently strong up-and-coming acts" and bands from the "peak-2007 Indie Portland era", with performances from Los Angeles DJs to indie bands in Portland.

=== Menu ===
The Gulf Coast- and Southern-inspired food menu included Cajun and Creole cuisine such as po'boys with catfish, popcorn shrimp, or fried cauliflower with olive salad as a vegan option. Beef debris (shredded roast beef with sauce) was used on sandwiches and loaded fries, which also had cheese sauce, green onions, and pickled Fresno chiles. The menu also included coleslaw, gumbo, red beans and rice, and "soggy salad" made from iceberg lettuce marinated in vinaigrette with garlic. Drink options included cocktails such as an absinthe frappé with absinthe and Meletti Dry Anisette, a Bloody Mary, daiquiris, a French 75, hurricanes, mint juleps, Sazeracs, Vieux Carrés, low-proof spritzes on draught, and beers from Fort George, Kokanee, Living Häus, Wayfinder, and other breweries. Another drink, known as The Brandy Crusta, had Brandy Sainte Louise, Combier Orange, Maraska maraschino, and bitters.

== History ==
Lollipop Shoppe opened on October 28, 2022. It operated in the space that previously housed the bar Dig a Pony, which closed in June 2022. Devon and Tyler Treadwell co-owned Lollipop Shoppe with Elizabeth Elder and Bryan Wollen, co-founders of the Lose Yr Mind music festival. Nick Seabergh was the opening chef. In an interview with the Portland Mercury, Elder said the venue's name came from a 1960s band of the same name, whose lead vocalist Fred Cole had a musical connection to Portland. Prior to opening, the venue made changes to the kitchen equipment and expanded the bar. The remodel took longer than anticipated, so some planned shows were hosted at nearby Swan Dive instead. The Treadwells gave up ownership of Lollipop Shoppe in December 2023, and Elder remained an owner up until 2025.

=== Events and programming ===
On opening night, Lollipop Shoppe hosted a Halloween show with music by the Reptaliens, Bijoux Cone, Buddy Wynkoop, and DJ Susan Saranwrap. Other acts that performed at the venue included the bands Rip Room and Spoon Benders, as well as Chipped Nail Polish, Forty Feet Tall, Jakki and the Pink Smudge, Brazilian musician Johnny Franco, Karma Rivera and DJ Lapaushi, Olympia-based Oh, Rose, the psychedelic synth duo Pearl and the Oysters, Papi Fimbres, and Veana Baby. Lollipop Shoppe hosted "The Thesis", a monthly hip-hop showcase that was previously held at Kelly's Olympian until 2024. The venue also hosted "RNB After Dark", the lesbian dance party "Dyke Nite", and the free music series "Monday Night Live". In 2025, Lollipop Shoppe hosted a listening party for a Shadowgraphs album as well as a concert featuring Roselit Bone, Railing, and Cage Mother.

=== Financial difficulties and closure ===
In August 2025, the business launched a GoFundMe campaign in an effort to raise $50,000 to pay staff and expand programming, which was unsuccessful. On November 2, the business announced plans to close permanently by the end of the month, citing increased operational costs, crime, and debt as the reasons for the closure. In a statement shared on social media, the owners said they "[needed] to restore our personal and financial balance". The local band the Macks performed on November 28, the closing night. Eldorado began operating in the space in 2026.

== Reception ==
Ezra Johnson-Greenough of Willamette Week described the venue as "open, low-key, approachable, and perfect for showcasing new bands", writing that any customer would have no worries on the cost of entry or fitting in with crowds. Meira Gebel included Lollipop Shoppe in Axios Portland's 2024 list of the city's six "most underrated" live music venues, calling it "the ultimate spot for dinner and a show".

Reporting on the closure, Hannah Seibold of the Portland Tribune said Lollipop Shoppe offered affordable concerts and "vibrant" cocktails. Nolan Parker of the Portland Mercury called the closure "devastating" and said Lollipop Shoppe was "one of Portland's best small rooms", and Parker said the venue brought "some of the most diverse music programming in the city".

== See also ==
- Culture of Portland, Oregon
- List of Cajun restaurants
- List of defunct restaurants of the United States
- List of music venues in the United States
