= Tulip Shop Tavern =

Restaurant in Portland, Oregon, U.S.

- Interactive map of Tulip Shop Tavern

Restaurant information
- Established: 2019
- Owners: Devon and Tyler Treadwell
- Food type: Eastern European
- Location: 825 North Killingsworth Street, Portland, Multnomah County, Oregon, 97217, United States
- Coordinates: 45.5628°N 122.6756°W
- Website: tulipshoptavern.com

Tulip Shop Tavern (TST) is a restaurant in Portland, Oregon, United States. Established in 2019, the business operates in the North Portland part of the Humboldt neighborhood. Devon and Tyler Treadwell are co-owners.

TST has been well received, especially for its burgers and fish sandwiches. It has been deemed one of the city's best restaurants by various publications, including Bon Appétit, The New York Times, The Oregonian, and Portland Monthly, and has been selected to represent Oregon in lists of the nation's restaurants having the best burgers and fish sandwiches by Mashed.com and Tasting Table.

== Description ==
The Tulip Shop Tavern (TST) restaurant and bar operates on Killingsworth Street, in the North Portland part of the Humboldt neighborhood; it has a back patio, as well as indoor space. Portland Monthly has described TST as "ostensibly a rough-and-tumble, dive-y 'tavern,' but really a world built atop thousands of scrupulously attended details". The interior has a blacklight mural. Bon Appétit said of the clientele: "Most everyone here looks like they might play in a metal band or work part-time at a bike shop." The restaurant has exterior neon signage that shows two tulips, each of a different color, in outline.

=== Menu ===
TST serves "Eastern European-centric tavern fare", according to Fodor's. The menu includes burgers, chicken wings, corn dogs, pork schnitzel, pickle-brined fried chicken, and Alaskan cod sandwiches, all served on milk buns from Dos Hermanos Bakery. TST also has beer-battered onion rings and French fries served with sauces made in-house, including curry ketchup and Alabama white barbecue sauce. The Fair Burger has caramelized onions, white American cheese, lettuce, pickles, and garlic aioli. Specials have included cheeses and chicken sandwiches.

Drink options include beer and cocktails such as an Aperol spritz slush and other slushies, banana daiquiris, Blue Hawaiians, margaritas, and vodka lemonades. Beer options include Czech and German lagers, as well as brews from local businesses such as Wayfinder. On the cocktail menu, the Paper Tiger has vodka, Becherovka bitters, grapefruit, lime, and salt. The "Party Shots" are served in pairs; among such options is a shot with iced coffee and tequila.

== History ==
TST opened in mid-2019, in the space that previously housed Duckett's Public House and, later, Pop Tavern. Spouses Devon and Tyler Treadwell are co-owners. TST was robbed in November 2019.

In 2025, Meira Gebel of Axios Portland said the restaurant's Instagram account "has become a well-oiled marketing machine". TST sells branded merchandise.

TST participated in PDX Savør week, which highlights non-alcoholic drinks, in 2026. The restaurant collaborated with Rangoon Bistro in 2026.

== Reception ==
In Bon Appétit's 2024 overview of recommended restaurants in Portland, Jordan Michelman said TST "feels reminiscent of 'Old Portland'". TST was also included in The New York Times's 2024 list of Portland's 25 best restaurants. The Manual's Mark Stock included the business in a 2024 overview of the nation's best bars. In 2025, Carlie Hoke selected TST's "Double, Double" to represent Oregon in Mashed.com's list of the best burgers in each state. Hunter Wren Miele selected the business for Oregon in Tasting Table's similar list in 2025. The website's Emily Hunt also included TST as representing the state in a 2025 list of best fish sandwiches, based on customer review websites.

In 2024, Andre Meunier of The Oregonian described TST as "a dive bar in disguise home to one of the city's best (lightly) smashed burgers, fantastic fried chicken and fish sandwiches and a tap list ... that puts many beer bars to shame". Michael Russell included TST in The Oregonian's 2024 list of Portland's best restaurants. He also called the business the city's best burger bar, and ranked TST number 33 in the newspaper's 2025 list of Portland's 40 best restaurants. Russell ranked TST's smash burger fifth in The Oregonian's list of the city's best. TST was ranked second in the "best burgers" category of the newspaper's readers' choice awards in 2024. Russell and Mims Copeland said the business "has the look and appeal of a great dive bar, only one where every detail — from the hand-cut onion rings to the beers on tap — has been carefully considered". In 2025, TST placed second in the same poll, and Russell offered a similar description of the restaurant in The Oregonian's 2025 list of fifteen cheeseburgers "every Portlander should know".

In 2020, Karen Brooks, Bill Oakley, and other writers for Portland Monthly ranked TST's "Tavern Burger" eleventh in a list of the city's 20 best cheeseburgers. In 2022, the magazine's Matthew Trueherz opined, "There's nothing fussy about bar food here, but with just enough attention to details, classics like generously battered, doughnut-size onion rings reach their full potential without being ruined by fanciful touches." Katherine Chew Hamilton, Margaret Seiler, and Trueherz included TST in Portland Monthly's 2023 list of the city's ten best bars. Hamilton also included TST in a list of ten Portland bars with "killer food". Brooks and Brooke Jackson-Glidden included TST in the magazine's 2025 list of the city's 50 best restaurants. Writers also included the business in a 2025 list of the city's best "budget-friendly" dishes. In 2021, Jason Cohen of Willamette Week said TST offered an "above-average fried fish sandwich". The newspaper said the restaurant "feels like a neighborhood staple that's been around far longer than not-even-three-years. It's achieved that by hitting the deceptively simple trifecta that many nouveau Portland bars struggle with: good vibes, good food and damn good drinks." Thom Hilton said TST "serves one of Portland's best" burgers in 2024. The business won in the Best Burger category of Willamette Week's annual "Best of Portland" readers' poll in 2024, 2025, and 2026.

In 2023, Jordan Michelman of Sprudge said TST had one of the city's best cocktail programs. Thom Hilton included TST in Eater Portland's 2024 list of the city's best establishments for late-night dining. In the website's 2024 list of the fifteen best eateries along Killingsworth, Nathan Williams wrote, "Bartenders serve both unpretentious-yet-inventive cocktails and dealer's choice shots, the beer list has plenty of nerdy picks but also domestic tall boys, and the kitchen churns out classic-but-well executed Americana like tavern burgers and wedge salads." Rebecca Roland and Alex Frane included TST in the website's 2025 overviews of the city's best burgers and best margaritas. In 2025, Matthew Korfhage of Wired recommended the restaurant "for a lower-key, punkier experience" and said TST has "terrific beer and cocktails and perhaps the city's best smash burgers".
