= Robo Taco =

Defunct Mexican restaurant in Portland, Oregon, U.S.

- The restaurant's exterior in October 2026, three months after closing
- Interactive map of Robo Taco

Restaurant information
- Established: 2011
- Owners: Jason Price; Jeff Sprague
- Chef: Jason Price; Jeff Sprague
- Food type: Mexican
- Location: 607 Southeast Morrison Street, Portland, Multnomah, Oregon, 97214, United States
- Coordinates: 45.5174°N 122.6595°W
- Website: robotacopdx.com

Robo Taco was a Mexican restaurant in Portland, Oregon, United States. The business operated in Southeast Portland's Buckman neighborhood from 2011 to 2026, serving tacos and other traditional cuisine such as burritos, chile rellenos, churros, huevos rancheros, nachos, pozole, and quesadillas. Jason Price and Jeff Sprague were both chefs and owners. Robo Taco had garnered a positive reception, before closing for unspecified reasons.

== Description ==
The Mexican restaurant Robo Taco operated in a small space on Morrison Street in Southeast Portland's Buckman neighborhood. The interior had many brightly colored plastic robots. The restaurant also had a large collection of video cassettes from the 1990s stored on top of a beverage dispenser. Robo Taco had a late-night following. In 2012, Benjamin Tepler of the Portland Monthly wrote, "A giant gyro rotisserie resembling the robot from Lost in Space slowly cooks the 'al pastor': a self-basting, skewered column of orange and árbol chile–marinated pork under a heaping disk of pineapple."

Bon Appétit and Willamette Week called Robo Taco a "kitschy, gringo-run place" and a "gringo taqueria", respectively. Thrillist described the restaurant as "the soft-shelled brainchild of some Mex-loving dudes with fine-dining chops, who've popped out a low-key joint with a '70s vibe, striking bright-tiled bar, and robot art that references the rotating, gyro-type broiler that puts the Robo in the name, which awesomely and unintentionally translates in Spanish to 'I steal taco'". The restaurant had a small television and played programming featuring Bob Ross, as well as films like Star Wars.

=== Menu ===
The restaurant served ten varieties of tacos, six meat and four vegetarian. Al pastor and carnitas were among varieties; other ingredients included barbacoa, beef tongue, fried oyster, pineapple, marinated portobello mushrooms, and cotija cheese, and pico de gallo. Vegetarian dishes included soy curls and soyrizo. Tacos had corn tortillas. Salsa varieties included avocado, chile de árbol, habanero, and tomatillo.

In addition to tacos, the restaurant served burritos, chile rellenos, churros, huevos rancheros, nachos, pozole, a quesadilla with carne asada, tortas, and sweet pastries. Among the 21 burrito varieties was a breakfast burrito with eggs, fried red potatoes, pinto beans, rice, pico de gallo, cream, and Monterey Jack. The torta milanesa had pork, avocado, black beans, and shredded lettuce. Robo Taco also served plates with rice and beans, as well as guacamole. KOIN described the restaurant as "vegan-friendly".

== History ==
Jason Price and Jeff Sprague were the chefs and owners of Robo Taco. Following a soft launch "taco party", the business began operating on Morrison Street on November 1, 2011, in the space that previously housed La Casita. The owners of Robo Taco acknowledged their lack of Mexican ancestry and said of the business name: "We didn't really want to give it a Spanish name because we're white people.We're not trying to be too authentic, though most of our Mexican customers really like our food." Robo Taco was a vendor at the music festival Pickathon in Happy Valley in 2014. The restaurant used tortillas from Salsas Locas in 2016.

In 2018, the owners opened a pinball and video arcade two doors down from the restaurant, called High Score. High Score served Robo Taco-branded frozen burritos. Due to declining weekday sales, Robo Taco stopped operating on Mondays, Tuesdays, and Wednesdays, starting in April 2026. In July 2026, the business announced plans to close permanently on July 26, for unspecified reasons. In the closure announcement Price wrote, "I know the place means a lot to some of y'all and I really truly am sorry to take it away. If there is a bright side to this, it's that I am taking time off of prepping and running the shop in order to (hopefully) return with a better bag of tricks for you to enjoy in the future."

== Reception ==
Exterior sign, 2026

Upon opening, the restaurant quickly gained a dedicated following. The Oregonian described Robo Taco as "a beacon for crowds spilling out of Dig a Pony and other nearby bars" in 2012. In an interview with Eater Portland, the newspaper's restaurant critic Michael Russell said Robo Taco was among taquerias he enjoyed visiting most often in 2012. Russell later included the business in The Oregonian's 2015 list of the city's ten best nachos, and ranked Robo Taco number 25 in a 2016 list of the "27 best places to eat after 10 p.m." Bon Appétit called the tacos "dangerously good" and especially recommended the carnitas variety. The magazine also said the torta milanesa was "as seductive at breakfast as it is late at night".

In 2012, Portland Monthly's Benjamin Tepler wrote, "Robo is great during the week, when locals, kids, and taco fanatics pack the shop. But beware the raucous weekends, when the place transforms into a late-night stumbling destination for hungry revelers from nearby bars Dig a Pony and Holocene. And the tacos, though blessedly cheap, are not the most expedient snack; expect to wait at least 10 minutes for your delicious bundles of pressed masa." Tepler and Martin Cizmer called the tacos "great" in 2012 and 2013, respectively. In his review of 2011 for the magazine, John Chandler named Robo Taco the city's 'Best Cheap Eats' and wrote, "I envy anyone who's yet to explore the Robo Taco menu." Karen Brooks said the "fun-loving" restaurant had "joined Portland's growing artisan taco movement" in 2012.

In a 2012 review of a different restaurant, Marjorie Skinner of the Portland Mercury wrote, "Between the five people in our party, all taco styles were consumed ... but the consensus was that Robo Taco's are still the ones to beat." Willamette Week's 'Cheap Eats' guide in 2012 called the tacos "a transport flight to a Mexican beach town" and said, "The patrons also evoke a kind of abbreviated spring break: They pile in from the nearby bars, wearing nice hats and smelling like cheap cigarettes." In a 2014 article called "You're not a proper patron of Portland's arts scene until you've...", the newspaper included "run into Mark Woolley at the Wonder Ballroom, Holocene, Lola's Room and Robo Taco all in the same night" as an entry. The newspaper's Matthew Korfhage said Robo Taco "is the gringo taco done right" and wrote:

In pure Portland style, they began with a half-assed robot theme but unlike L.A.—which might have installed a veritable Japanese museum—Robo threw up a couple paintings and then pretty much forgot about it. While they're open for lunch every day, this is essentially a drunken mecca for Southeast Portland's new bar district, a protein stop that just so happens to make solid salsa and have better vegetarian taco options than meat: the portobello mushrooms, for example, and the lovely chile relleno taco that's a tour of textures.

Robo Taco was a runner-up and received honorable mention in the Best Taqueria and Best Burrito categories of Willamette Week's annual 'Best of Portland' readers' poll in 2015. It was a runner-up in the Best Burrito and Best Taco categories in 2016. The business placed third and was a runner-up in the same categories, respectively, in 2017. Drew Tyson included Robo Taco in Thrillist's 2015 overview of Portland's thirteen best taco restaurants. He said the business "captures the vibrant atmosphere a taco stand should at two in the morning", with a menu offering "something for everyone".

== See also ==
- Hispanics and Latinos in Portland, Oregon
- List of defunct restaurants of the United States
- List of Mexican restaurants
