= Trust Electricity =

Studio album by The Upsidedown
- Released: August 10, 2004
- Recorded: Winter, 2003–2004
- Genre: Rock
- Length: 74:02
- Label: Reverb Records
- Producer: The Upsidedown/Tony Lash

The Upsidedown chronology
| Trust Electricity (2004) | Human Destination (2008) |

Trust Electricity is the debut album by American band The Upsidedown.

The album has received national attention in several newspapers and magazines including Magnet, The Boston Globe, and The Oregonian. Music from Trust Electricity has also been featured on the television programs What About BrianWhat about him?, Fast Inc, and Trauma.

== Track listing ==
All songs written by J. Atoms unless otherwise stated.

1. "The Way In" – 0:26
2. "Wake Up Drive Thru" – 2:46
3. "Blackeye Liner" – 3:28
4. "Saint Theresa of the Roses" – 4:53
5. "I Wish I Could See You Right Now" – 0:40
6. "Bumpersticker" – 4:28
7. "Walk on Fire" – 5:24
8. "Elizabeth" – 3:28
9. "Pepper Spray" – 2:22
10. "Drag Race" – 3:08
11. "Dutchess of York" – 6:05
12. "Airplane Eyes" – 5:27
13. "Sacred Call" – 6:34
14. "Radio Broadcast" – 1:53
15. "Spirit in the Sky" – 5:14

== Commercial usage of tracks ==
=== National Television ===
- "Bumpersticker" was used in the fourth episode of Trauma, airing October 19, 2009 on the American commercial television network, NBC.
