= Tonga Hut =

Coordinates: 34°11′11″N 118°24′44″W

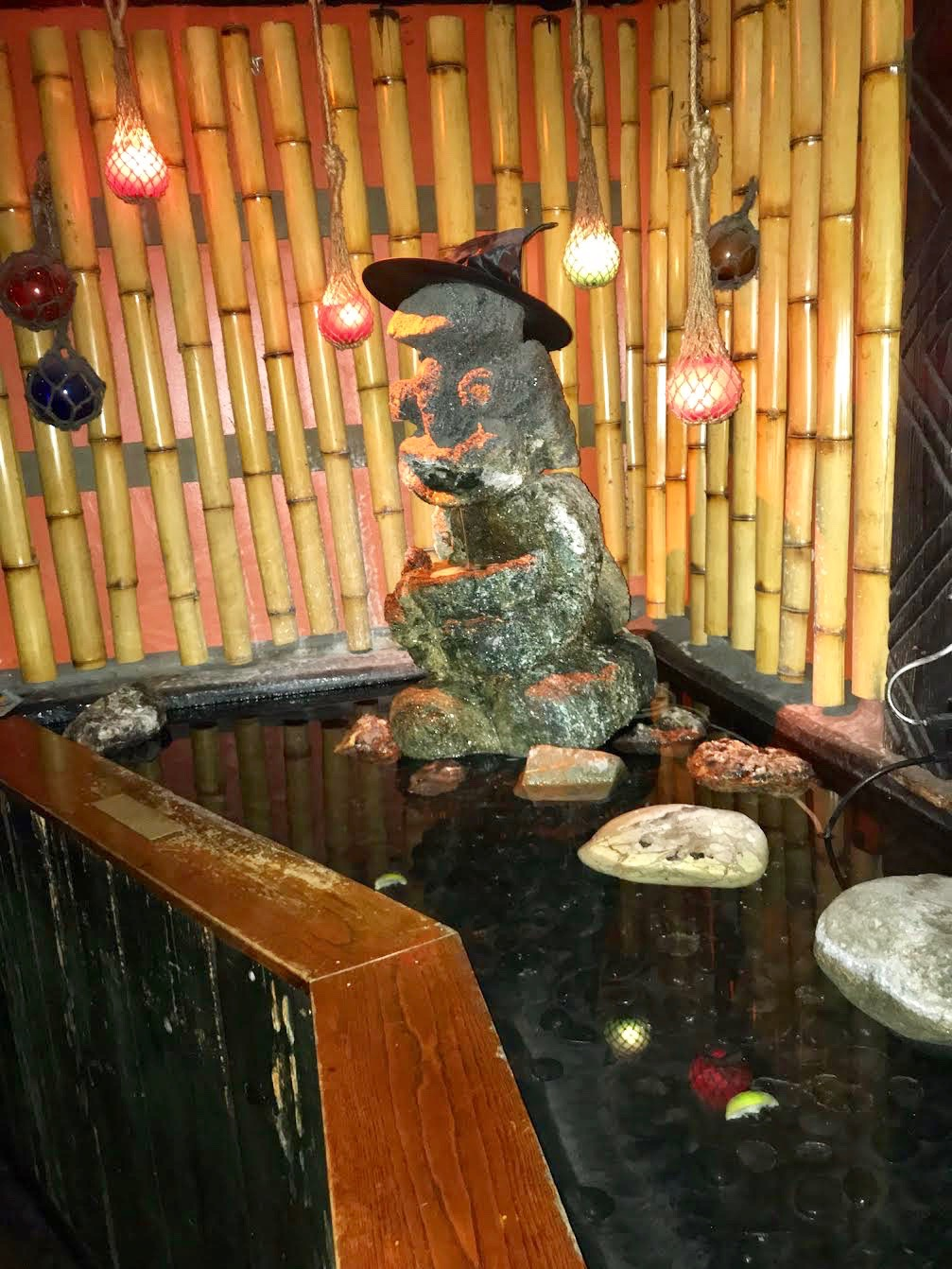
- Company type: Private
- Industry: Bar
- Founded: 1958
- Founder: Ace and Ed Libby
- Headquarters: 12808 Victory Blvd., North Hollywood, California, United States
- Website: tongahut.com

Tonga Hut is a tiki bar in Los Angeles, California. It is the oldest extant, and was founded in 1958.

== History ==
Having worked at a Polynesian restaurant on Sepulveda Boulevard in Van Nuys, brothers Ace and Ed Libby decided they wanted to open their own Polynesian bar. They purchased their storefront at 12808 Victory Blvd. in North Hollywood, and hired an architect to design the bar and fountains. They named the bar after the Kingdom of Tonga, discovered by Captain James Cook in 1773 in the South Pacific.

Jeremy Fleener and Ana Reyes bought the bar in November 2005. By 2013, Amy Boylan was a co-owner. Kevin and Claudia Murphy later became co-owners.

In 2014, a Palm Springs branch of Tonga Hut opened. Unlike its Los Angeles counterpart, it serves Polynesian food along with drinks.

During the COVID-19 pandemic in California, the Los Angeles bar added a 2,000 square feet (190 m^{2}) pandemic-friendly patio to its floor plan. Decor was donated to enliven the space, items such as potted palms, a moai, and a six-foot vintage swordfish.

Libations at Tonga Hut include the Mai Tai, Blue Hawaiian, Dark and Stormy, Bermuda Dunes, Old Skool Zombie, Voodoo Juice, and Rhumboogie.

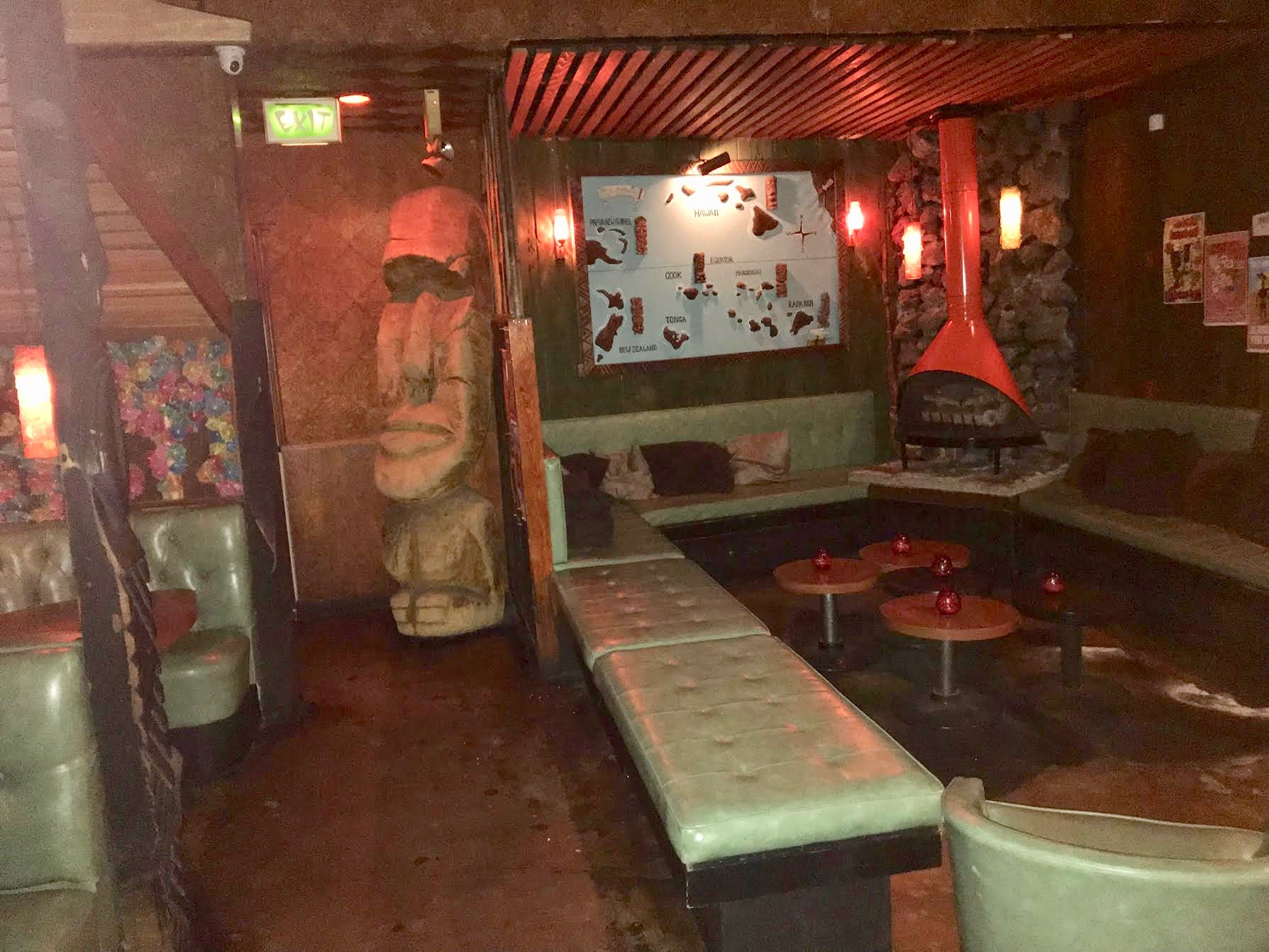
Part of the Tonga Hut interior.
