= Laraha =

Subspecies of citrus fruit

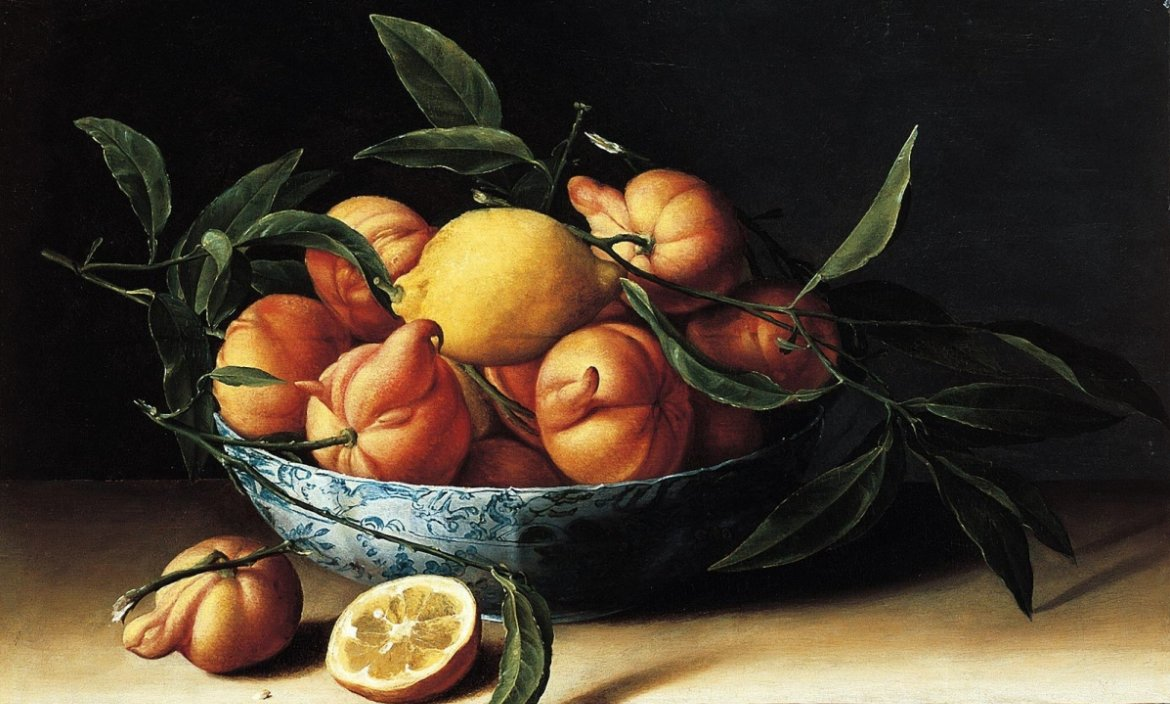
- Still life with a bowl of Curaçao oranges
- Species: Citrus × sinensis subsp. currassuviencis
- Cultivar: 'Laraha'
- Origin: Curaçao, south Caribbean

Laraha (Citrus × aurantium subsp. currassuviencis), or Curaçao orange (Citrus aurantium var. currassuviencis), is a citrus tree that grows on the island of Curaçao, and also the fruit of this tree. The name is cognate with Portuguese laranja for the orange. A descendant of the bitter orange, the fruit of the laraha is too bitter and too fibrous to be considered edible.

== History and use ==
Seville orange trees transplanted on Curaçao from Spain in 1527 did not thrive in the arid climate and soil of this Southern Caribbean island. As the trees were then abandoned, the fruit evolved from a bright orange colour into the green laraha. The dried peels of the laraha, however, were discovered to be pleasantly aromatic. Extracts of the peels of laraha are used in the manufacture of Curaçao liqueur.

The Bols company says that Lucas Bols (1652–1719) developed a laraha-based liqueur after the discovery that an aromatic oil could be extracted from the unripe peel of the otherwise useless bitter oranges. Bols then had this oil exported back to Amsterdam to produce a liqueur similar to current day curaçao. In 1912, Bols sold blue curaçao as Crème de Ciel ("cream of the sky"), most likely a reference to the 1907 musical Miss Hook of Holland.
