= The Upsidedown =

American alternative rock band

Background information
- Origin: Portland, Oregon, United States
- Genres: Alternative rock Psychedelic rock Shoegazing
- Years active: 2003–Present
- Labels: Reverb Records; Beat the World Records; Divorce Money Records
- Members: Jsun Atoms; Matt Moore; Bob Mild; Brett Kron; Tristan Evans
- Past members: Jonathan Allen; Rob Scrivner; Caroline Buchalter; Sarah Jane; Jason "Plucky" Anchondo
- Website: theupsidedown.com

The Upsidedown "Silver Wind"
The Upsidedown's "Silver Wind", from the album Human Destination.

The Upsidedown is an American alternative rock band from Portland, Oregon, United States.

The band released their debut album, Trust Electricity, in 2004, and reissued it on vinyl in 2020. The album has received national attention, and the band has been noted in several newspapers and magazines as an up-and-coming band to watch, including Magnet, The Boston Globe, and The Oregonian. Their music has also been featured on the television programs True Blood, Sons of Anarchy, The Vampire Diaries, Life Unexpected, What About Brian, and Trauma.

The Upsidedown has toured the United States, sometimes as an opening act. They have a close friendship with The Dandy Warhols, and have also performed with The Jesus and Mary Chain, Black Rebel Motorcycle Club, Richard Butler, David J, Colin Meloy, The Black Angels, The Dears, The Out Crowd, The Village Green, and Spindrift. They have also worked with Tony Lash and Jeremy Sherrer, on their albums.

== Album discography ==
- Trust Electricity (2004) Reverb
- Human Destination (2008) Beat the World Records
- The Town With Bad Wiring (2010) Reverb
- Trust Electricity 2020 Vinyl Remaster (2020) Divorce Money Records

== Soundtracks ==
The Upsidedown supplied four songs from their catalog ("Human Destination", "Sacred Call", "Umbrella", and "The Way In") to the film Water Wings, directed by Johno Wells and Justin Adams.

== Commercial usage of tracks ==
=== National television ===
- "Hell", the second track from Human Destination was used in Season 2, Episode 15 of Sons of Anarchy, "Small Tears", airing September 15, 2009 on the American commercial cable television network, FX (TV channel). The song was used during and through the post party bar scene, seven minutes into the episode.

The Upsidedown's music has been featured extensively on NBC's Trauma

- "Hey Man I'm Kissing The Angels Shoes", Track 12 from Human Destination: episode 102, airing October 5, 2009. The song was used near and over the climax of the episode.
- "Silver Wind", Track 3 from Human Destination: episode 104, airing October 19, 2009.
- "Light", Track 7 from Human Destination: episode 104, airing October 19, 2009.
- "Bumpersticker", Track 6 from Trust Electricity: episode 104, airing October 19, 2009.
- "Black Rainbow", Track 10 from Human Destination: episode 105, airing October 26, 2009
- "Elizabeth", was used in episode 408 of Californication.
