= Curaçao (liqueur) =

Liqueur made with the dried peels of the laraha citrus fruit

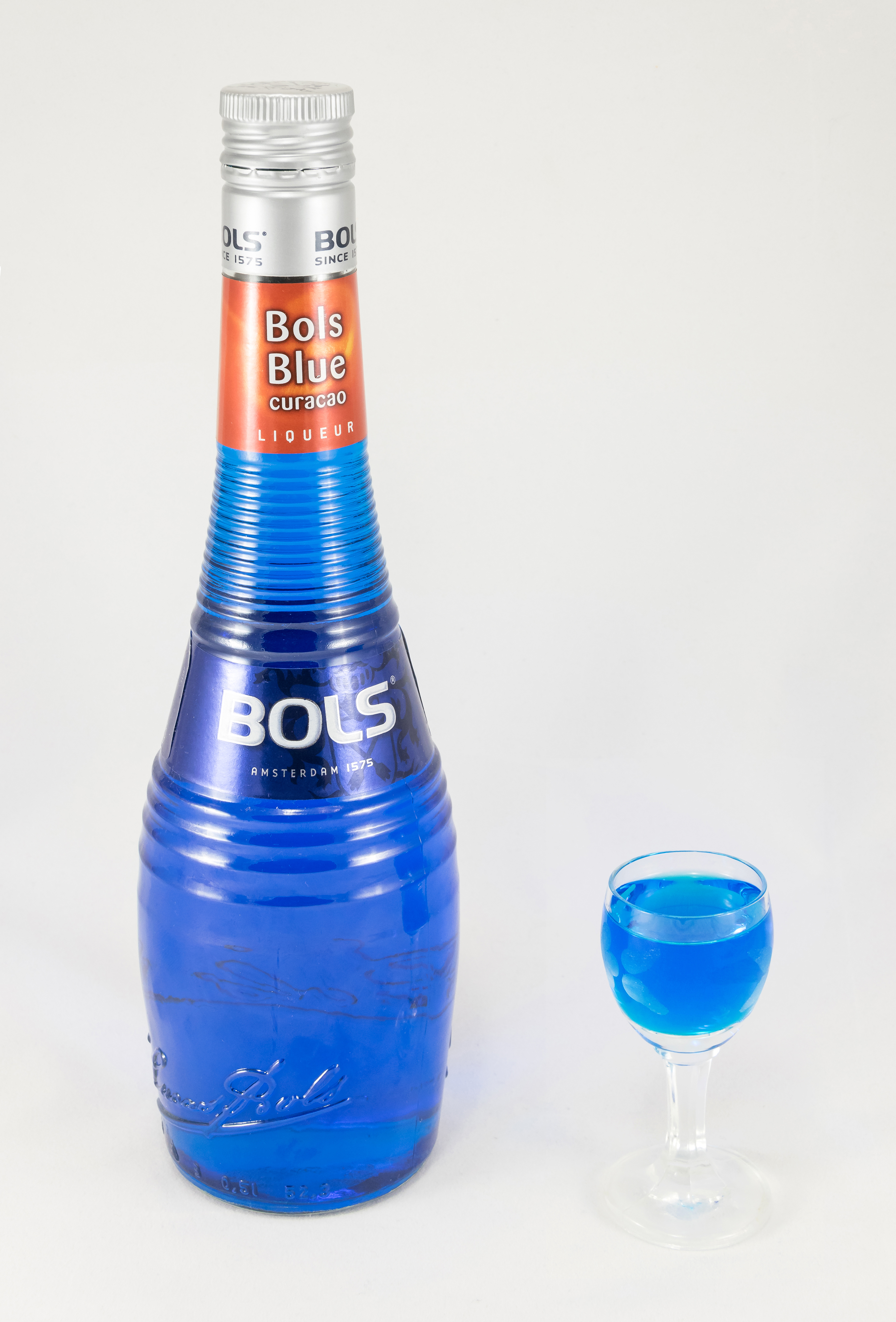
- Bols blue curaçao liqueur
- Type: Liqueur
- Manufacturer: (various)
- Origin: Curaçao
- Introduced: c. 18th century
- Alcohol by volume: 15–40%
- Proof (US): 30–80° US/26 1/4–70° UK
- Color: Colorless, but often artificially colored, with the most popular hues being blue and orange
- Flavor: Bitter and sweet orange

Curaçao (/ˈkjʊərəsaʊ, -soʊ/ KURE-ə-sow, -soh; Dutch: [kyːraːˈsʌu]) is a liqueur flavored with the dried peel of the bitter orange variety laraha, a citrus fruit grown on the Caribbean island of Curaçao. Curaçao can be sold in numerous forms. The most common forms include the orange-hued dry curaçao and the blue-dyed blue curaçao.

== History ==
It is not definitively known who developed the first curaçao liqueur, or when. The Dutch West Indies Company took possession of Curaçao in 1634. The Bols distillery, founded in 1575 in Amsterdam, held shares in both the West and East India Companies to ensure access to the spices required for its distilled drinks. According to the early nineteenth-century French culinary chronicler Alexandre Grimod de la Reynière, curaçao originated in Flanders, and proximity to the county Holland gave distillers easy access to the necessary peels (since Curaçao was a Dutch colony at the time).

Curaçao liqueur is traditionally made with the dried peels of the laraha (Citrus × aurantium subsp. currassuviencis), a bitter orange that had selectively adapted to conditions on Curaçao island. Spanish explorers had brought the progenitor of the laraha, the bitter Seville orange, to the island in 1527. Although the bitter flesh of the laraha is unpalatable, the peels are pleasantly aromatic.

The Bols company says that Lucas Bols (1652–1719) developed a laraha-based liqueur after discovering that an aromatic oil could be extracted from the unripe peel of otherwise useless bitter oranges. Bols then had this oil exported back to Amsterdam to produce a liqueur similar to current-day Curaçao. In 1912, Bols sold blue curaçao as Crème de Ciel ("cream of the sky"), most likely a reference to the 1907 musical Miss Hook of Holland.

Senior & Co, a company started in Curaçao, is the only company that has always produced its liqueur from the peels of the laraha from Curaçao. The family, Senior and Chumaceiro, started selling their liqueur in 1896 in their pharmacy in small quantities. In 1947 they bought the landhuis ("country manor") Chobolobo in Willemstad, where the distillery has since been housed. The company states that it is the only one that uses native laraha fruit, and label it Genuine Curaçao Liqueur.

The liqueur is mentioned several times under the spelling "curacao" in William Makepeace Thackeray's Vanity Fair of 1847–48 as a drink taken by dissolute young men. For example, Lady Jane Southdown pays her brother "a furtive visit in his chambers in the Albany; and found him – O the naughty dear abandoned wretch! – smoking a cigar with a bottle of curaçao before him."

== Preparation ==
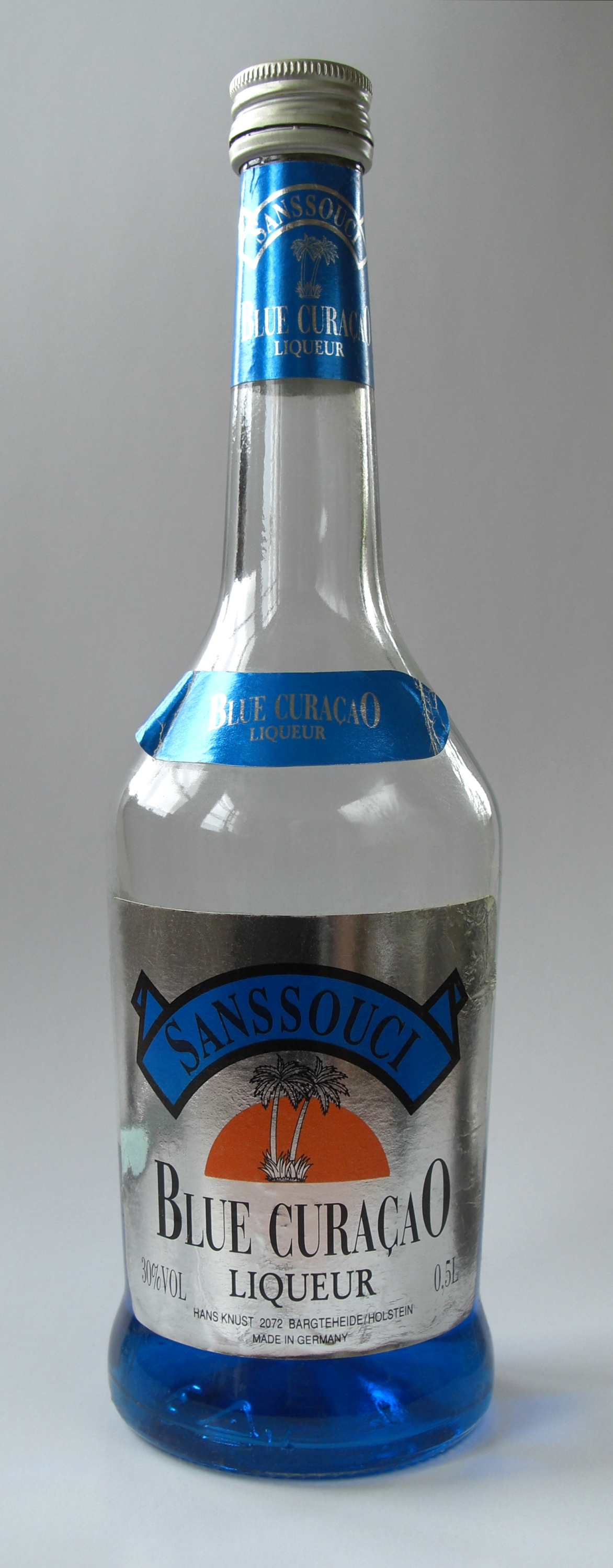
A bottle of blue curaçao

To make the liqueur, Senior and Co soak laraha in alcohol and water for several days, then remove the peel and place it in a hessian bag. Spices are added, and the bag is hung in a heated 120-year-old copper still with 96% alcohol for three days. After one day cooling, water is added and the mixture is distilled for three days. The liqueur has an orange-like flavour with varying degrees of bitterness. It is naturally colourless, but colouring—most commonly blue (often E133 brilliant blue) or orange—is often added to give cocktails and other mixed drinks an exotic appearance.

Some other liqueurs are also sold as curaçaos with different flavors added, such as coffee, chocolate, rum, and raisin. Pierre Ferrand, a cognac and dry Curaçao brand, produced a less sweet "Ancienne Méthode" curaçao using 1800s techniques.

== See also ==
- List of liqueurs
- Blue Hawaiian
- Tia Maria
- Triple sec
