= The Town with Bad Wiring =

Studio album by The Upsidedown
- Released: September 28, 2010
- Recorded: Reverb Studios
- Genre: Rock
- Length: 62:45
- Label: Reverb
- Producer: Collin Hegna/Nalin Silva

The Upsidedown chronology
| Human Destination (2008) | The Town with Bad Wiring (2010) |

Professional ratings
Review scores
| Source | Rating |
|---|---|
| LipMag | |
| Pure Grain Audio | |

The Town with Bad Wiring is the third album by American band The Upsidedown.

== Track listing ==
All songs written by J. Atoms unless otherwise stated.

1. "Something Good" - 3:09
2. "Your Sister's Cool" – 6:51
3. "La Paloma" - 3:54
4. "Town with Bad Wiring" - 7:25
5. "God's Bare Hands" - 3:51
6. "Wounded Knee" - 4:19
7. "Hang On" – 6:48
8. "Whiskey Boots of Snake" - 3:44
9. "Spiders" - 4:18
10. "Indio Bernice" – 5:22
11. "Night Kissed" – 5:46
12. "Katydid" – 7:18

=== Notes ===
- Videos for "Something Good" (directors: Cairey Haider and Justin Adams), "God's Bare Hands" (director: Justin Adams), and "Hang On" (director: Justin Adams) have been filmed.
- The Upsidedown performed La Paloma with R.E.M.'s Peter Buck on November 5, 2010, at the Albert Rose Theater for an OPB event.

== Personnel ==
- Jsun Atoms – Vocals, guitars, keys
- Brett Kron – Guitars
- Matt Moore – Guitars, vocals
- Tristan Evans – Bass guitar, vocals
- Bob Graham Mild – Drums and percussion
- Jason 'Plucky' Anchondo – Drums and percussion
