= Dig a Pony (bar) =

Bar and restaurant in Portland, Oregon, U.S.

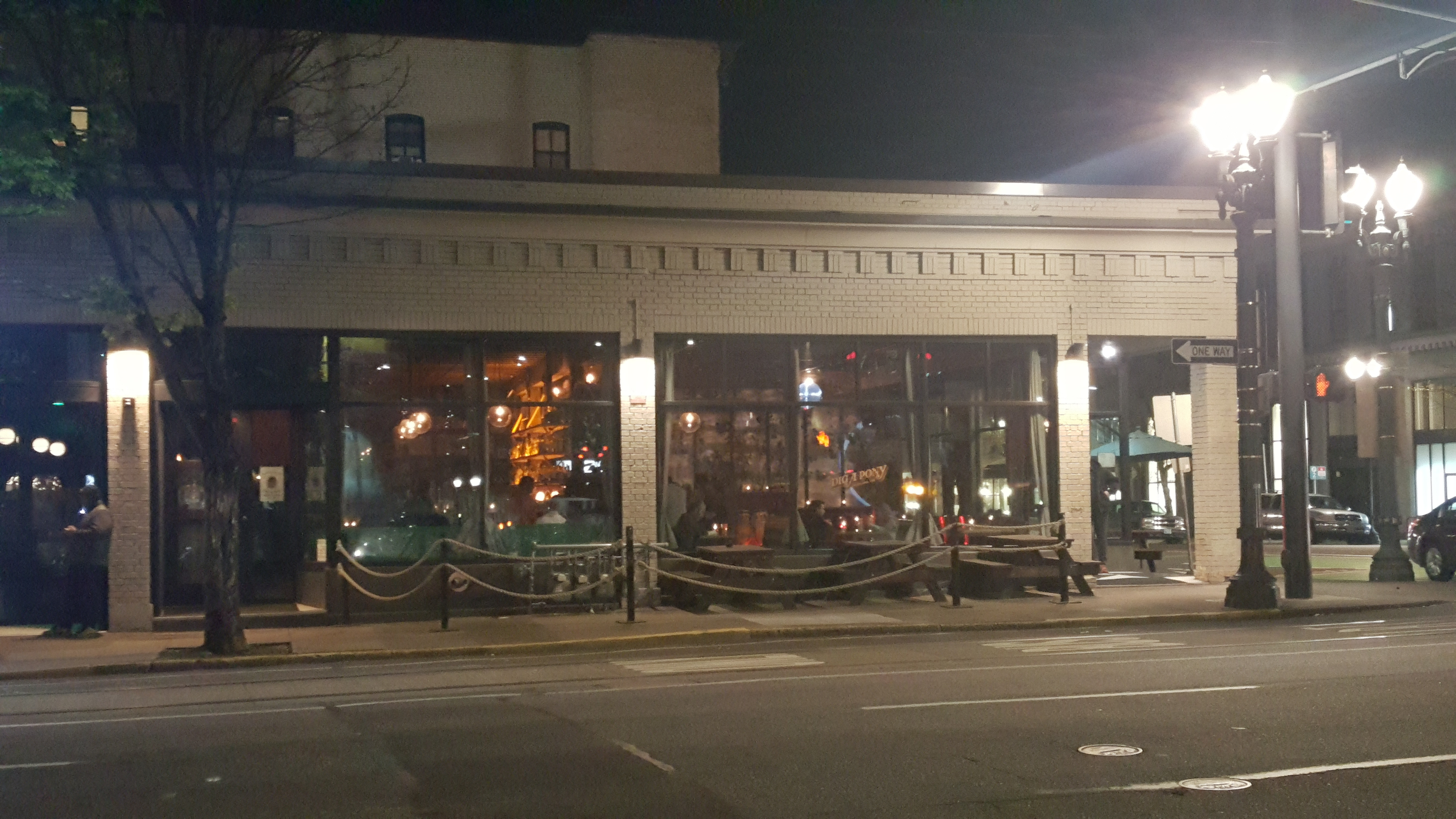
- The bar's exterior at night, 2022
- Interactive map of Dig a Pony

Restaurant information
- Established: July 28, 2011
- Closed: June 2022
- Owners: Elizabeth Elder; Devon Treadwell; Tyler Treadwell; Bryan Wollen
- Previous owners: Jacob Carey; Aaron Hall; Page Finlay
- Food type: American
- Location: 736 Southeast Grand Avenue, Portland, Multnomah, Oregon, 97214, United States
- Coordinates: 45.5174°N 122.6605°W
- Website: digaponyportland.com

Dig a Pony (DAP) was a bar and restaurant in Portland, Oregon. Named after the Beatles' song of the same name, the business opened in mid 2011. Dig a Pony closed in June 2022, following an ownership change.

== Description ==
Dig a Pony was a popular bar on Grand Avenue, at the intersection with Morrison, in southeast Portland. Named after the Beatles' 1970 song of the same name, Dig a Pony had a 40-person horseshoe-shaped bar, as well as a century-old piano, vintage church pews, and stained glass. According to The Oregonian, the walls were "decorated with vintage pictures, animal skulls, color-coded books and a two-tiered bar lined with glittering bottles".

=== Menu ===
The menu included American cuisine such as sautéed mushrooms with soft egg and French fries, chicken thighs with stewed tomatoes and almonds, and a barbecue tempeh sandwich served with avocado and citrus coleslaw. The drink menu included a Bloody Mary called Blood on the Bayou, and the Lomo (bourbon, ginger drinking vinegar, yellow chartreuse, orange bitters, soda water). The bar began using cheese from Bandon-based Face Rock Creamery in 2015. The business has served pie and Montel Spinozza for Thanksgiving.

When Burger Stevens moved into the kitchen, the menu included hamburgers, fried chicken sandwiches, a Cuban-inspired sandwich with barbecue pork, ham and pickles, and broccoli with green ranch and pickled peppers.

== History ==
The bar replaced longtime Greek diner Niki's Restaurant. Partners Jacob Carey, Aaron Hall, and Page Finlay opened Dig a Pony with Gregory Gourdet as consulting chef. The bar opened on July 28, 2011, with Josef Valoff as kitchen manager. Within a few months, several interior decorations were stolen, including a taxidermy pheasant nicknamed "David Bowie". The bar hosted an anniversary celebration featuring free music.

In 2015, the bar and Face Rock Creamery's president Greg Drobot hosted Mongers' Lodge Night featuring cheese samples, cocktails, music, and happy hour specials. Don Salamone, owner of the food cart Burger Stevens, moved into the kitchen in 2018. A walk-up window for Burger Stevens opened on the Morrison Street side of Dig a Pony in 2019. During the COVID-19 pandemic, Salamone served takeout Italian meals as Stevens Italiano; the meals included chicken cacciatore, rigatoni in tomato sauce, Caesar salad, and garlic bread.

In 2022, the business was sold to Elizabeth Elder and Bryan Wollen of Lose Yr Mind Fest, as well as Devon and Tyler Treadwell of the Tulip Shop Tavern in north Portland. Dig a Pony closed in June 2022, and was replaced by the music venue Lollipop Shoppe in October.

== Reception ==
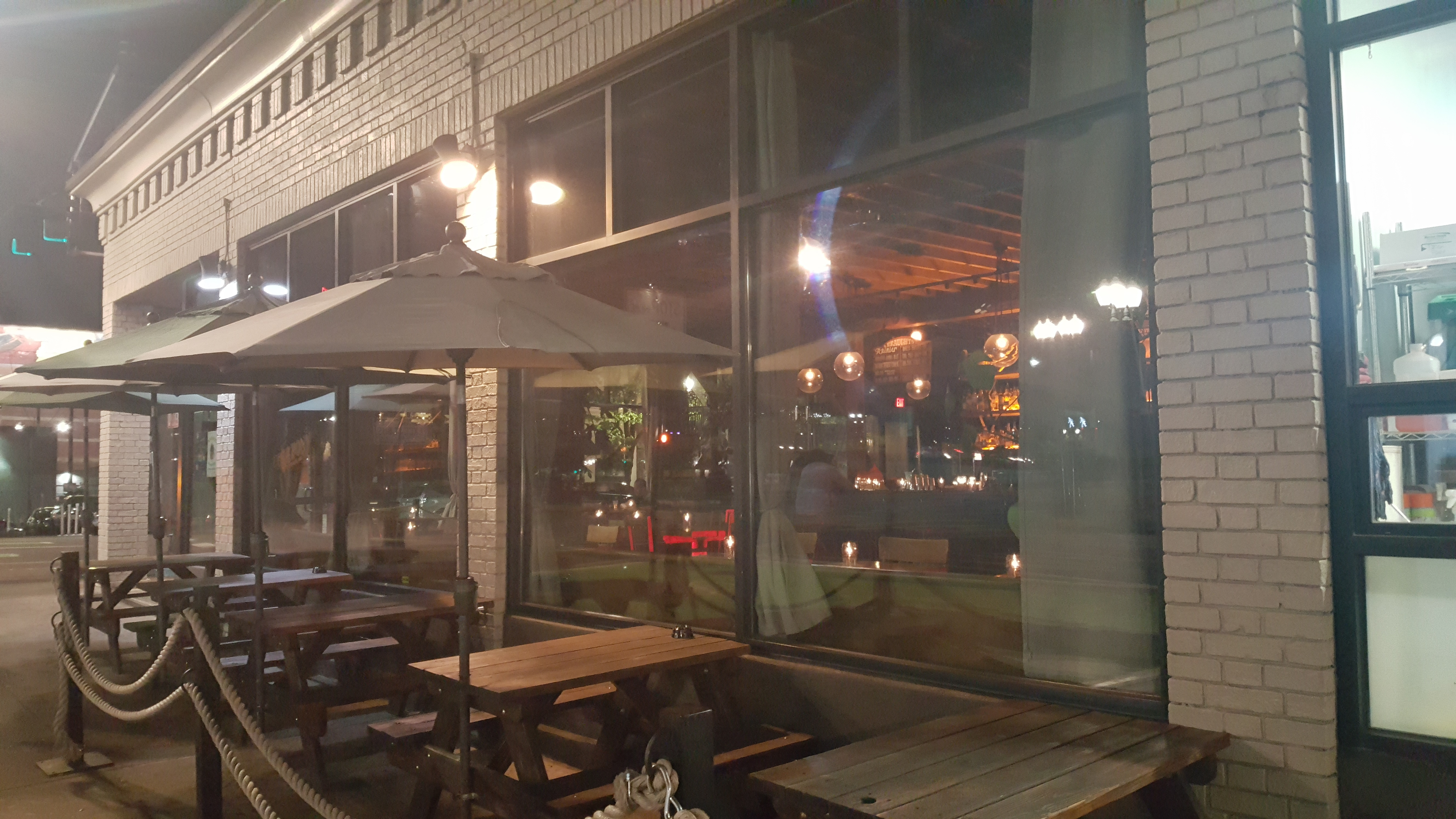
The bar's exterior at night in 2022

Michael Russell included Dig a Pony in The Oregonian's 2014 list of Portland's 100 best bars. The business was also included in Samantha Bakall's 2016 list of the city's 10 best "high dives (aka the hipster bars)", and Lizzy Acker's 2017 list of "23 places to go dancing in Portland". 101 Places to Get F*cked Up Before You Die (2014) said the bar's staff were "easy on the eyes".

Pete Cottell included Dig a Pony in Thrillist's 2015 list of "10 Portland Bars You Should Avoid Once You're 30" and wrote: "The idea of 'bridge and tunnel bars' has caught on in Portland, and with this place being packed out with neon-clad bros from Beaverton aggressively doing laps and Tinder-ing rather than actually talking to humans of the female variety here, Dig A Pony is the terminally hip Eastside's primary offender. Good food if you show up early enough to get a table, though!" In 2017, Tan Vinh of The Seattle Times said the bar "spins soul and has the soul of old Portland".
