= Federale (band) =

US musical group

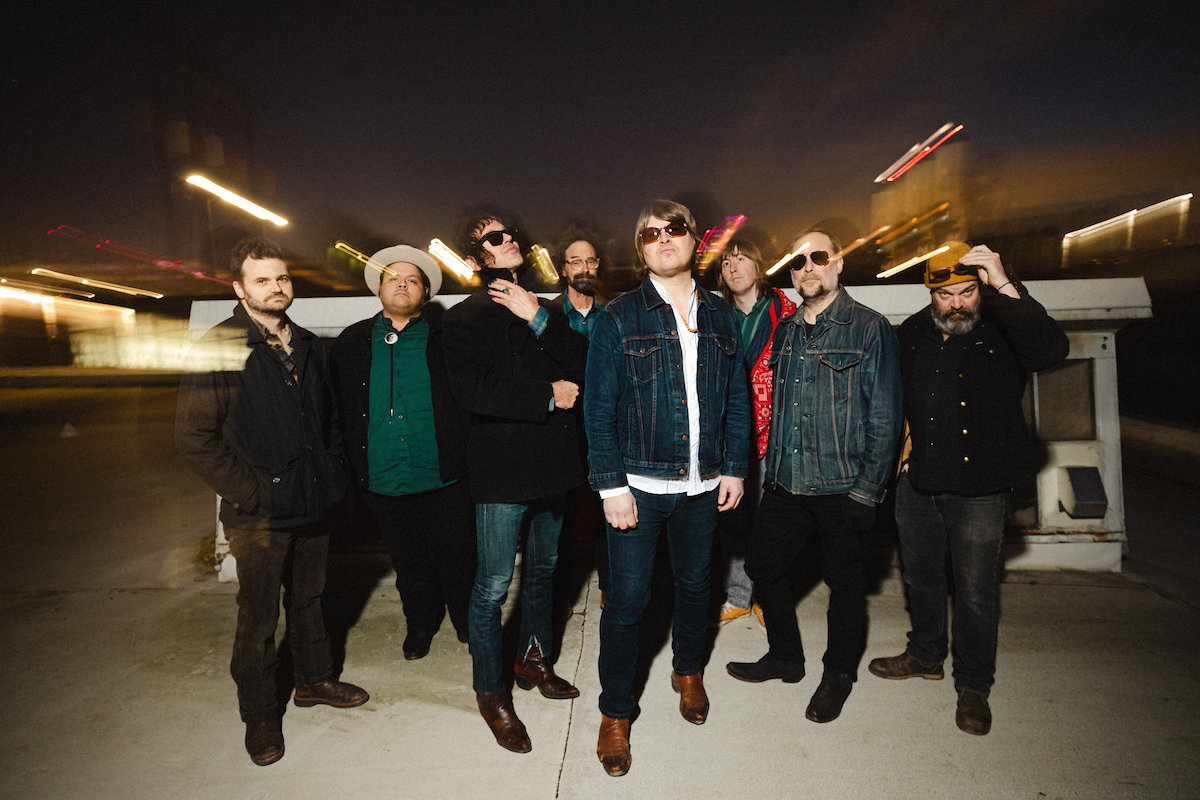

Background information
- Origin: Portland, Oregon, United States
- Genres: Psychedelic rock; Indie rock
- Years active: 2004–present
- Members: Collin Hegna; Rick Pedrosa; Pat Spurgeon; Jared Molyneux; Cory Gray; Ryan Lynn
- Past members: Maria Karlin; Nalin Silva; Lance Seaton; Dusty Dybvig; Dasa Kalstrom; Sebastian Bibb-Barrett; Colin Sheridan; Brian Gardiner; Carl Werner
- Website: Official website

Federale is an American psychedelic rock ensemble based in Portland, Oregon. Their cinematic musical style draws inspiration from European genre films such as Spaghetti Westerns and giallos, with a notable emphasis on the compositions of Ennio Morricone.

== History ==
Federale was established in 2004 following the disbandment of the Portland group Cocaine Unicorn, spearheaded by Collin Hegna of The Brian Jonestown Massacre. The concept was initiated by drummer Ryan Sumner, in collaboration with guitarist Carl Werner and percussionist Dasa Kalstrom, who, along with Hegna, sought a new musical direction after their previous band disbanded. Sumner envisioned creating music similar to Morricone's cinematic compositions. Sumner died due to a blood clot in his heart before they could record their debut album. However, the band chose to continue in his memory and dedicated their first album to him.

In their earlier albums, the band primarily focused on instrumentals. However, their more recent works, like their fifth album "No Justice," released in 2019 under Jealous Butcher Records, feature both Hegna's vocals and Maria Karlin's operatic style.

The release, "Blood Moon / Mona Lisa," serves as the soundtrack for Ana Lily Amirpour's third feature film, "Mona Lisa And The Blood Moon." The movie premiered at the 2021 Venice Film Festival and was released in theaters on September 30th, 2022.

The ensemble has released 5 full-length albums, with the lineup and size varying over time. Previous notable members of the band include Sebastian Bibb-Barrett of The Builders and the Butchers, Colin Sheridan of The High Violets, and Dusty Dybvig of Bark Hide and Horn.

== Discography ==
- La Rayar: A Tale of Revenge (Revolver Records, 2008)
- Devil In A Boot (Revolver Records, 2009)
- The Blood Flowed Like Wine (Federale Records, 2012)
- All The Colours Of The Dark (Death Waltz Originals, 2016)
- No Justice (Jealous Butcher Records, 2019)
