= Human Destination =

Studio album by The Upsidedown
- Released: August 12, 2008
- Recorded: The Odditorium
- Genre: Rock
- Length: 48:02
- Label: Beat the World Records
- Producer: The Upsidedown/Jeremy Sherrer

The Upsidedown chronology
Trust Electricity (2004)	Human Destination (2008)

Professional ratings
Review scores
Source	Rating
Fazer Online Music Magazine	link
NeuFutur Online Music Magazine	link
Royalsreview.com Monthly Music Review	link

Human Destination Is the second album by American band The Upsidedown.

== Track listing ==
All songs written by J. Atoms unless otherwise stated.

1. "Licorice Noir" – 0:36
2. "If You Are Hell Girl" – 2:56
3. "Silver Wind" – 2:28
4. "Human Destination" – 3:28
5. "Umbrella" – 3:41
6. "Light" – 2:50
7. "Ambient 32" – 3:00
8. "Halo" – 3:15
9. "Ernestine" – 2:42
10. "Black Rainbow" – 3:17
11. "#29" – 4:01
12. "Before Remember" – 5:54
13. "Before That" – 6:06
14. "Hey Man I'm Kissing The Angels Shoes" – 3:48

=== Notes ===
- Videos for Human Destination (Director: Justin Adams, Johno Wells (filmmaker), Silver Wind (Director: Matt Moore), and Umbrella (Director: Mike Bruce) have been filmed.
- Guitarist Brett Kron was stung by a Ray in Southern California while filming the video for Silver Wind.

=== Commercial Use of Tracks ===
- "Hell" was used in Season 2, Episode 15 of Sons of Anarchy, "Small Tears", airing September 15, 2009 on the American commercial cable television network, FX (TV channel). The song was used during and through the post party bar scene, 7 minutes into the episode.
- "Hey Man I'm Kissing The Angels Shoes" was used in the second episode of Trauma (U.S. TV series), airing October 5, 2009 on the American commercial television network, NBC. The song was used near and over the climax of the episode.
- "Silver Wind" was used in the fourth episode of Trauma (U.S. TV series), airing October 19, 2009 on the American commercial television network, NBC.
- "Light" was used in the fourth episode of Trauma (U.S. TV series), airing October 19, 2009 on the American commercial television network, NBC.

== Personnel ==
- Jsun Atoms – Vocals, Guitars
- Brett Kron – Guitars
- Matt Moore – Guitars, Vocals
- Tristan Evans – Bass Guitar, Vocals
- Sarah Jane – Keys, Vocals, Percussion
- Bob Graham Mild – Drums and Percussion
