= Blue Hawaiian =

Cocktail

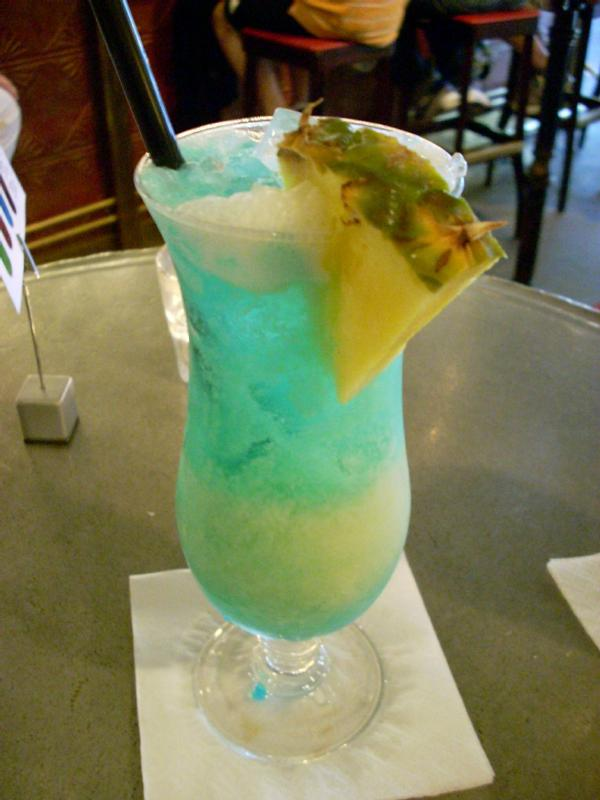
A Blue Hawaiian

The Blue Hawaiian or Swimming Pool is a Piña Colada with an added splash of blue curaçao to give it an orange flavor. It is made with light rum (e.g. Pineapple Malibu rum or white rum), blue curaçao, pineapple juice, cream of coconut, and lemon juice. It is garnished with a pineapple wedge, maraschino cherry and cocktail umbrella and served in a hurricane glass with pebble ice, or in a Collins glass. A frozen Blue Hawaiian can be made by putting all the ingredients in a blender with some crushed ice and pulsing them to a creamy consistency.

The use of light rum allows the blue color from the curaçao to come through. Adding more pineapple juice results in a greenish blue color. Champagne or prosecco can be added to make a sparkling Blue Hawaiian.

Difford's Guide notes, "Probably created by Don the Beachcomber in Los Angeles, USA, this is a riff on the Blue Hawaii."
