= Roselit Bone =

American Western Band

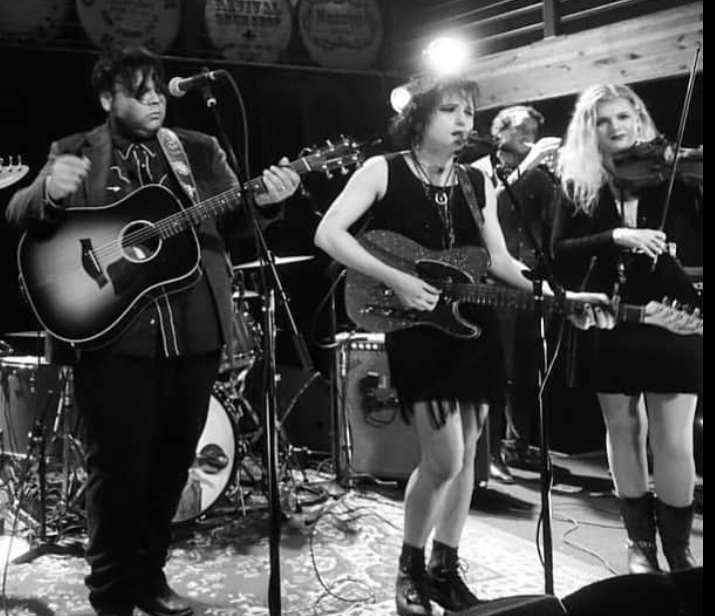
- Roslit Bone playing live

Background information
- Origin: Portland, Oregon , U.S.
- Genres: Goth Country; Spaghetti Western; Cowpunk
- Years active: 2013–present
- Labels: Doomtown Sounds; Friendship Fever; Get Loud
- Members: Charlotte McCaslin; Faith Grossnicklaus; John England-Fisher
- Website: www.roselitbone.com

Roselit Bone is a multi-instrumental and vocal ensemble based in New Orleans, Louisiana, consisting of eight members, with occasional variations in size. The band's musical style is characterized by a blend of gothic country, punk rock, ranchera, folk music, and cinematic Western influences.

== History ==
Established in 2013, Roselit Bone initially began as a duo featuring Charlotte McCaslin and Ben Dahmes. Their collaboration was initiated when Dahmes, working as a sound engineer, crossed paths with McCaslin during one of her performances with a prior band at a local venue. Roselit Bone then expanded into a trio with the addition of Victor Franco in 2014, initially on bass before moving to guitar. Subsequently, the band's desire for the recruitment of additional members, including violinist Faith Grossnicklaus, trumpeters, keyboardists, synth players, drummers, and multiple guitarists. This expansion was driven by the evolving songwriting needs of McCaslin, requiring a more diverse range of instrumental accompaniment.

Throughout the band's existence, they have engaged in extensive touring, predominantly within the United States. During the initial years of touring, the band traversed the country aboard a school bus.

== Writing style ==
McCaslin, as the primary songwriter, ensures each piece is suitable for solo performances or duets and imbues them with a folk essence. This approach prioritizes adaptability and emphasizes the song's quality before considering arrangements or introducing it to the larger band. After introducing the song to the band, a full arrangement is typically developed, followed by extensive workshopping with various band members to ensure accuracy and cohesion in the live band setting.

== Members ==
- Charlotte McCaslin – Lead vocals, guitar
- Faith Grossnicklaus – Violin
- John England-Fisher – Trumpet, piano, backing vocals, percussion

== Discography ==
=== Studio albums ===
- Blacken & Curl (2014)
- Blister Steel (2017)
- Crisis Actor (2019)
- Offrenda (2023)

=== Singles ===
- "Dreamless Sleep" (2017)

=== Live albums ===
- "Live at Ella Street Social Club" (2017 cassette)
