= Wayfinder Beer =

Brewery in the U.S. state of Oregon

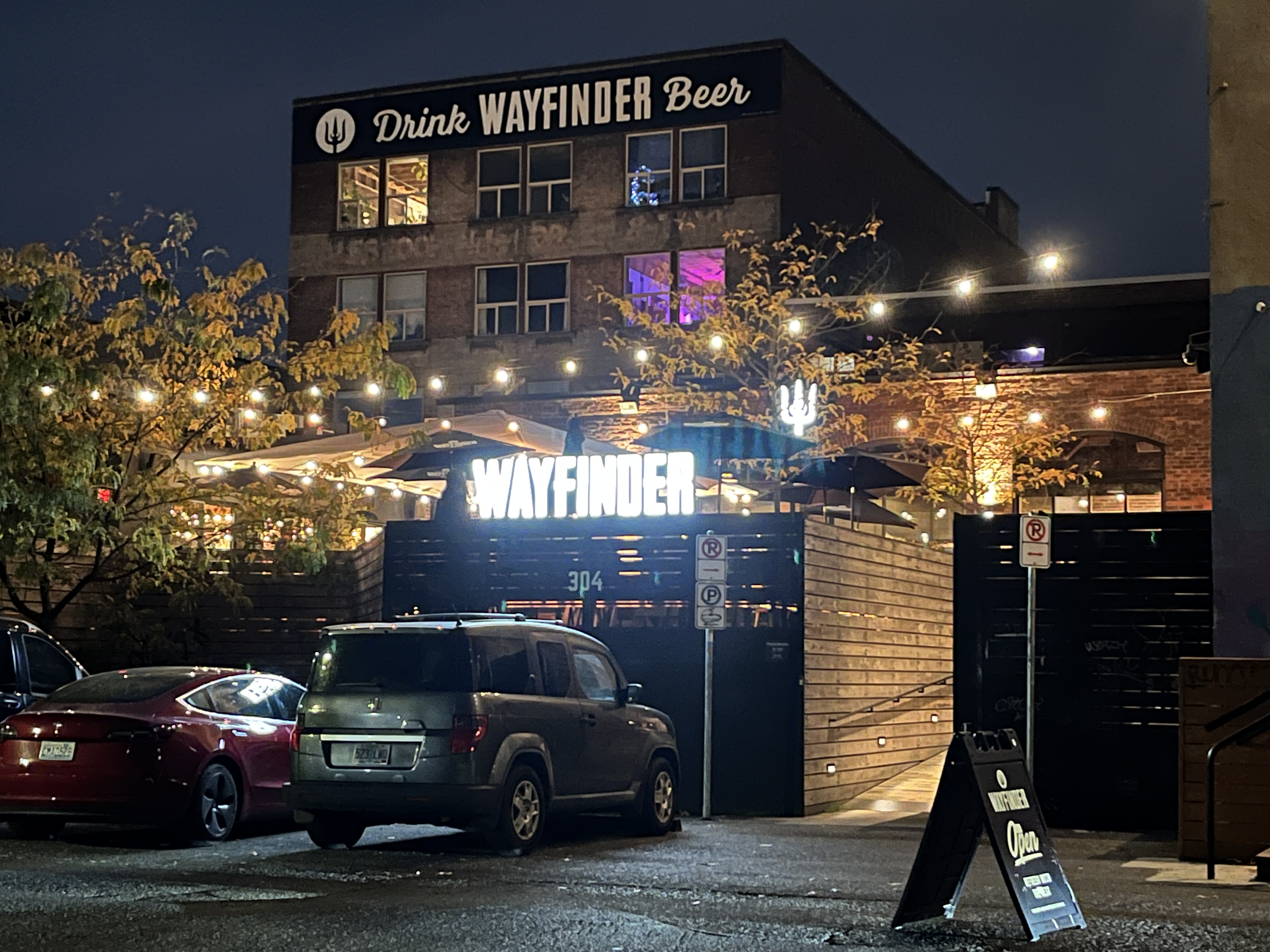
- The brewery's exterior in Portland, Oregon's Buckman neighborhood at night, 2024
- Interactive map of Wayfinder Beer

Restaurant information
- Location: 304 Southeast 2nd Avenue, Portland, Multnomah, Oregon, 97214, United States
- Coordinates: 45.5207°N 122.6636°W
- Website: wayfinder.beer

Wayfinder Beer is a brewery based in Portland, Oregon, United States. The business also operates in Troutdale.

== History ==
Wayfinder opened in southeast Portland's Buckman neighborhood in 2016. Natalie Rose Baldwin is the brewmaster preceded by founding brewmaster, Kevin Davey.

== Reception ==
Wayfinder was included in The Daily Meal's 2023 list of Portland's fifteen best breweries. The brewery won in the Best Labels/Branding category at the Oregon Beer Awards in 2024.

== See also ==
- Brewing in Oregon
