= Trauma (American TV series) =

- Genre: Medical drama
- Created by: Dario Scardapane
- Starring: Derek Luke; Anastasia Griffith; Aimee Garcia; Kevin Rankin; Taylor Kinney; Jamey Sheridan; Cliff Curtis
- Composer: Bear McCreary
- Country of origin: United States
- Original language: English
- No. of seasons: 1
- No. of episodes: 18

Production
- Executive producers: Dario Scardapane; Peter Noah; Peter Berg; Sarah Aubrey; Jeffrey Reiner
- Producer: Steven Sassen
- Running time: 40 minutes
- Production companies: False Mirror Films; Film 44; Universal Media Studios; Open 4 Business Productions

Original release
- Network: NBC
- Release: September 28, 2009 – April 26, 2010

Trauma is an American medical drama television series created by Dario Scardapane which was aired on NBC from September 28, 2009, to April 26, 2010. The series focused on a group of paramedics in San Francisco, California.

On May 14, 2010, NBC cancelled the series after one season.

== Plot ==
The series was about a group of paramedics from San Francisco, California.

== Cast and characters ==
=== Main ===
- Cliff Curtis as Reuben "Rabbit" Palchuck: Rabbit was given his nickname by a paramedic at the age of 13, for his speed and endurance as a runner. Rabbit survives a fatal helicopter crash that kills EMT Terry Banner and the pilot, Asher "Rotor" Reynolds. Rabbit often uses sardonic humor with his job and has a free-thinking rule-bending approach to things, of which his new pilot, Marisa Benez, disapproves. When Rabbit attempts to show Marisa his gift of "not dying" by driving her home at a ridiculously reckless speed, inspired by the movie Bullitt, he accidentally clips a man's car door and severs his finger. The intoxicated man is convinced, with some help from Rabbit, that he himself caused the accident, a lack of ethics Marisa strongly objects to. Reuben's PTSD symptoms after the helicopter crash are revealed as a fear of flying. After receiving support from his friends and colleagues, he faces his fear by flying in an intense storm and surviving. In "Blue Balloon", we learn that Nancy and Rabbit are a couple, and that both Nancy and Rabbit want to keep their altered relationship secret from the rest of the crew. This relationship began at "Thank You", when Rabbit went to Nancy's parents' house for Thanksgiving.
- Derek Luke as Cameron Boone: Cameron is a paramedic paired with Tyler Briggs. They often argue over trivial things but they typically enjoy a good working relationship. He is married with two young children and desperately tries to keep the horrors of his job from his home-life, while simultaneously feeling frustrated by not being able to vent the pressures of his job, even to his wife. Boone has also been unfaithful to his wife, Sela, which she discovers. The two eventually agree to go to marriage counseling, but soon afterward when Boone responds to a shooting rampage in a lawyer's office, he finds that Sela is there being held hostage. After saving her life, he learns that Sela was in the office consulting a divorce lawyer. During Halloween, as they remain in place in the event partyers need assistance, Boone expresses disapproval of the homosexual community, leading to Tyler telling Boone that he himself is gay. When Tyler and Boone respond to an ambulance crash in which Nancy and Glenn are among the victims, Boone insists Tyler follow accepted triage protocol and attend to the most injured first. Because this involves his friends and colleagues, he feels guilty about his decision, but receives praise from his superiors for doing the right thing.
- Anastasia Griffith as Nancy Carnahan: Nancy, a medical school graduate turned paramedic, was originally paired with Terry Banner, a partner with whom she was having an in-work relationship when they responded to an electrocution on a rooftop. The easy run turned tragic when the rescue helicopter was destroyed in a tragic accident, costing Terry and the pilot, Asher "Rotor" Reynolds, their lives. The scenes depicting the event which took place one year previous are shown on the show's pilot episode. Her partner after Terry was Sam Bailey, who only appeared in the present-day scenes in the pilot. In episode two, Nancy is paired with a new EMT, Glenn Morrison, and exhibits her unacknowledged post traumatic stress disorder (PTSD) by her many one night stands. Nancy constantly teases and makes fun of Glenn for being a newbie, as does the rest of the team. The entire team made bets on how long it would take for Nancy to sleep with Glenn but their relationship has remained platonic. Nancy and Reuben "Rabbit" Palchuck are very close. Their relationship was strained when Reuben survived the crash that killed Terry, but while treating victims of a shooting rampage Rabbit takes a bullet for Nancy after she refuses to allow the shooter to kill one of the injured.
- Aimee Garcia as Marisa Benez: One year after the fatal helicopter accident, young military veteran Marisa joins the SFFD as the pilot of the rescue helicopter where she is partnered with Reuben "Rabbit" Palchuck. Rabbit's rule-bending and often comedic style differs from her stern by-the-book way of working but she eventually learns to tolerate Rabbit's actions.
- Kevin Rankin as Tyler Briggs: Tyler and his partner Cameron Boone enjoy a good working relationship although they constantly bicker on a daily basis. Tyler was also a survivor of the fatal helicopter crash one year ago that killed EMT Terry Banner. Tyler still respects Terry's memory by even refusing to beat Terry's score on a video game. Tyler recently came out of the closet to Boone while posted in downtown San Francisco on Halloween. Tyler felt troubled over Boone's obvious homophobia, but since coming out to his partner they have managed to maintain their partnership and friendship.
- Taylor Kinney as Glenn Morrison: Glenn is brought in as a new EMT one year after the fatal helicopter crash that killed EMT Terry Banner. Glenn is partnered with Terry's former girlfriend, Nancy. Glenn puts up with a lot of nasty practical jokes and hazing by the other EMTs, who refer to him as "probie". During a massive car accident at a town fair, Glenn wants to treat the driver who caused the accident last, but Rabbit reminds him that they are there to treat victims, not to decide who is good or bad. Glenn forms a close friendship with ER intern Diana Van Dine as they are both new to their jobs. That same day Glenn's distractions while driving to a softball injury cause his and Nancy's rig to be broadsided by an oncoming bus, leading to a massive accident. Glenn and Nancy are both hurt, but Nancy is injured more seriously with a lacerated spleen and internal bleeding. Glenn feels responsible for the accident, something he later confesses to Diana after she misdiagnoses Glenn's CT scan and Glenn ends up collapsing in a bar after getting into an argument with an inebriated Rabbit.
- Jamey Sheridan as Dr. Joseph "Joe" Saviano: Dr. Joe, or often "Joey", by Rabbit, is Chief of Emergency Medicine for the hospital. While fond of all of the paramedics, he is especially close to Nancy. Nancy displays her innate surgical abilities by successfully repairing a torn artery in an impalement case with great agility. Dr. Saviano is impressed by her skills and encourages her to follow through with her training as a doctor. He writes Nancy a letter of recommendation for a residency rotation but two hours later Nancy and Glenn are brought in after their ambulance is broadsided by a bus. Nancy suffers internal bleeding and requires a splenectomy. The Chief of Staff at the hospital (who just happens to be Nancy's father), finds the letter that Joe wrote and later confronts him in an elevator. He strongly implies that Joe has feelings for Nancy and that any relationship between them would be inappropriate. Joe is particularly tough on the new ER intern, Diana Van Dine. Near the end of the show, he is suspended by hospital administration for permitting Nancy to perform a Rapid Sequence Induction on an injured cheerleader in order to provide an airway, a procedure without which she would have died. Sadly, she is later found to be paralyzed. As a result, he goes on a drinking binge and is never seen again for the remainder of the show.

=== Recurring ===
- Scottie Thompson as Dr. Diana Van Dine: Diana is a new ER intern at the hospital who, like EMT Glenn Morrison, is frequently the butt of her co-workers' jokes. Rabbit flirted with her until she gave him a firm "No". Diana eats lunch in the laundry room to avoid the nurses and other doctors. After Glenn joins her one-day, they realize—much to their surprise—that they are both natives of neighboring communities in the Lehigh Valley area of Pennsylvania. When Glenn and Nancy are later involved in a motor vehicle accident, Diana is instructed to take point on Glenn's hospital stay and she fails to double-check his CT scan. Later Glenn and a drunk Reuben get into an altercation at a bar and Glenn collapses. After a firm reprimand by the Hospital Board, Diana is once again discouraged about her career but Glenn manages to make her feel like one of the group after he and Nancy regain consciousness.

== Production ==
A month after its premiere NBC announced it would not order any further episodes, but would broadcast the 13 episodes ordered. On November 19, 2009, NBC reversed its decision, announcing it had ordered three additional episodes of the series, bringing the order to 16 episodes; the order was extended to 20 episodes on January 20, 2010, as part of a package of episode orders that followed the demise of The Jay Leno Show. Trauma returned on March 8, 2010, with the season finale scheduled for May 10, 2010. In early April 2010, NBC reduced the episode order down to 18 and announced an April 26, 2010 finale.

On May 14, 2010, the show was cancelled by NBC after one season.

=== Filming ===
The pilot episode featured a multi-vehicle accident and resulting giant fireball, which were filmed in March 2009 on Interstate 280 in the Mission Bay neighborhood just south of downtown San Francisco.

All episodes included an air helicopter ambulance base station, San Francisco Fire Department Station 4, which in later episodes was located at a converted warehouse (Bldg. 180) on California Ave and US Naval Station Way, Treasure Island. The warehouse still stands, and still has "Angel Rescue Services" and SFFD logos on it. In earlier episodes the air helicopter ambulance base station was located at Naval Airship Square (helipad) by an abandoned Naval firehouse (Bldg. 111) on Pan American World Airways Esplanade and Avenue I, Treasure Island. Interior scenes were filmed on a converted sound stage in Hangar/Bldg 3 at 600 California Ave., Treasure Island. The ambulances used in production were manufactured in 2008 by MedTec Ambulance Corporation. They were trucked back to Los Angeles shortly after the show was cancelled. The two main production ambulances, 2008 Medtec Type III ambulances, were sold shortly after, to Franklin Park Fire Department and Hamilton County Ambulance. The four other Type II ambulances were returned to their private leasing company.

The show has used places like Alameda Point for filming. One of the destroyed jets can be seen in Google Imagery.

The production participated in the San Francisco "Scene in San Francisco Incentive Program" administered by the San Francisco Film Commission.

== Episodes ==
No.	Title	Directed by	Written by	Original release date	US viewers (millions)
1	"Pilot"	Jeffrey Reiner	Dario Scardapane	September 28, 2009	6.70
The paramedics at the San Francisco Fire Department respond to an electrocution on a rooftop. The rescue helicopter crashes killing the victim, EMT Terry Banner (Ryan Kennedy), the pilot, Asher "Rotor" Reynolds, and almost Rabbit. One year later, the badly emotionally scarred paramedics return to work and deal with a massive car pileup on the highway and face their own personal life dilemmas.
2	"All's Fair"	Jeffrey Reiner	Dario Scardapane	October 5, 2009	5.37
An out of control car runs into a street fair in Justin Herman Plaza. Glenn Morrison joins the team replacing Sam Bailey, who appeared as Nancy's present day partner on the pilot.
3	"Bad Day at Work"	Jeffrey Reiner	Peter Noah	October 12, 2009	5.52
The Trauma team is put into a hostage situation when an irate former employee goes on a shooting rampage in an office building, the same building where Boone's wife Sela is held hostage. The event forces Nancy and Rabbit to work together for the first time since the helicopter accident.
4	"Stuck"	Christopher Misiano	Bruce Rasmussen	October 19, 2009	5.46
While Tyler and Boone respond to an explosion at a Chinese Restaurant, they make a startling discovery while evacuating the building. Rabbit is forced to face his feelings concerning the accident after he panics during a bumpy flight. Nancy has to put her expert medical skills to the test while repairing the artery of an impalement victim.
5	"Masquerade"	Jean de Segonzac	David Schulner	October 26, 2009	5.78
It's Halloween in San Francisco and Boone finds out a secret from Tyler that could affect their partnership.
6	"Home Court"	Norberto Barba	David Schulner	November 2, 2009	5.82
Nancy and Glenn respond to an incident at a softball game when their rig is broadsided by a bus. Dr. Saviano writes a recommendation letter for Nancy.
7	"That Fragile Hour"	Alex Zakrzewski	Bruce Rasmussen	November 9, 2009	5.35
Glenn learns the hard way the consequences of not following the rules and Marisa's Army past catches up with her in a surprising way.
8	"M'Aidez"	John Behring	Janet Tamaro	November 16, 2009	5.16
The trauma team must save the passengers of a sinking ship.
9	"Coming Home"	Eric Laneuville	Peter Noah	November 23, 2009	5.39
Thanksgiving travel is halted when an airliner is forced to make an emergency landing.
10	"Blue Balloon"	Steve Shill	Randy Huggins	November 30, 2009	5.89
Boone assumes duties of acting captain for the day. A teacher and druggies are treated after taking bad heroin in blue balloons. A Vietnam vet steals Rabbit and Marissa's helicopter. Rabbit, Marissa, and Tyler pursue the stolen helicopter in Tyler's rig.
11	"Tunnel Vision"	Darnell Martin	Janet Tamaro	March 8, 2010	4.78
Nancy must face her claustrophobia while treating a construction worker who has fallen. Rabbit treats an injured bank robber and Boone is placed in a new position.
12	"Protocol"	Jeffrey Reiner	Y. Shireen Razack	March 15, 2010	5.25
Going by the book costs Glenn a patient as he struggles to rebound from it.
13	"13"	Jeffrey Reiner	Dario Scardapane	March 22, 2010	4.34
Rabbit is reinstated after revealing his past during therapy. An old-school captain temporarily oversees the paramedic team. Nancy and Diana clash over Nancy playing doctor in the field. Tyler and Boone discuss their futures as Tyler passes the paramedic exam and Boone is offered the job of captain.
14	"Targets"	John Badham	David Schulner	March 29, 2010	4.80
A sniper targeting firemen, police officers and paramedics causes havoc in San Francisco as the team responds to emergencies.
15	"Scope of Practice"	Michael Waxman	Randy Huggins	April 5, 2010	5.03
Nancy gets caught in a lawsuit after doing a procedure that was out of protocol leaving a cheerleader paralyzed from the neck down. Rabbit and Marisa are quarantined after treating a patient infected with meningitis. Boone stays at Tyler's house for a few days and a joke played on Boone creates tension between them.
16	"Frequent Fliers"	Michael Waxman	David Schulner	April 12, 2010	4.55
A "frequent flier" who repeatedly sends false calls to the team suddenly passes away.
17	"Sweet Jane"	Colin Bucksey	Dario Scardapane	April 19, 2010	4.68
Nancy starts to feel a strong connection with an abandoned baby. Rabbits attempts to make his relationship with Nancy "normal" by cooking a special dinner. The team share their stories about their weirdest calls to Glenn, who makes a book out of those stories. Tyler finally comes out to his dad when he comes to San Francisco. And Marisa reveals she was married.
18	"Crossed Wires"	Michael Nankin	Y. Shireen Razack & Shannon Rutherford	April 26, 2010	5.00
Dispatchers send out misleading calls, leaving the paramedics confused and frustrated, especially Tyler. Boone sets up a party for Tyler's birthday. Nancy started to question the future of their relationship when Rabbit talks to her about finding a place together. Marisa's friend Casey, who was discharged from Afghanistan, comes to San Francisco.

== DVD releases ==
Name	Region 1	Region 2	Region 4	Discs
Trauma: The Complete Series	August 10, 2010	—N/a	—N/a	4
