= Aotearoa Music Award for Breakthrough Artist of the Year =

Annual New Zealand music award

Breakthrough Artist of the Year is an Aotearoa Music Award that honours New Zealand music artists for outstanding recordings. Artists who have previously been nominated for a New Zealand Music Award (excluding Critics' Choice Prize and technical awards) or has had a previous album reach the top 20 of the Official New Zealand Music Chart are ineligible. The award was first awarded in 1973 as Best New Artist.

== Recipients ==
=== Best New Artist (1973-1976) ===
Year	Winner	Ref.
1973	Shona Laing	
1974	Bunny Walters	
1975	Space Waltz	
1976	Dr Tree	
1977	No awards held	—N/a

=== Most Promising (1978-2000) ===
Year	Award	Winner	Finalists	Ref.
1978	Most Promising Male Artist	Dennis O’Brien	—N/a	
1978	Most Promising Female Artist	Kim Hart	—N/a	
1978	Most Promising Group	Citizen Band	—N/a	
1979	Most Promising Male Artist	Jon Stevens	—N/a	
1979	Most Promising Female Artist	Tina Cross	—N/a	
1979	Most Promising Group	Street Talk	—N/a	
1980	Most Promising Male Artist	Jon Stevens	—N/a	
1980	Most Promising Female Artist	No award presented	—N/a	
1980	Most Promising Group	The Crocodiles	—N/a	
1981	Most Promising Male Artist	Dave McArtney	Paul Schreider; David Hollis; Richard Eriwata	
1981	Most Promising Female Artist	Anne Dumont	Celine Toner; Jenny Morris	
1981	Most Promising Group	Dave McArtney	Blam Blam Blam; Pop Mechanix	
1982	Most Promising Male Vocalist	Dave Dobbyn (DD Smash)	—N/a	
1982	Most Promising Female Vocalist	Jodi Vaughn	—N/a	
1982	Most Promising Group	Dance Exponents	—N/a	
1983	Most Promising Male Vocalist	Andrew McLennan (Coconut Rough)	Dick Driver (Hip Singles); Gary Smith (The Body Electric)	
1983	Most Promising Female Vocalist	Sonya Waters	Rhonda Jones; Bronwyn Jones (Precious)	
1983	Most Promising Group	Coconut Rough	Hip Singles; The Body Electric	
1984	Most Promising Male Vocalist	Martin Phillipps (The Chills)	Ross McKenzie (The Idles); Wayne Gillespie	
1984	Most Promising Female Vocalist	Meryl Yvonne	Janice Lampen; Sharon Dubont	
1984	Most Promising Group	The Chills	Jive Bombers; You're a Movie	
1985	Most Promising Male Vocalist	Mark Loveys (Satellite Spies)	Paul Eversden (Katango); James Gaylyn (Rise)	
1985	Most Promising Female Vocalist	Debbie Harwood	Dianne Swann (Everything That Flies); Betty-Anne Monga (IQU)	
1985	Most Promising Group	Satellite Spies - "Destiny In Motion"	Everything That Flies - "Bleeding Hearts"; Katango - "Dial L for Love"	
1986	Most Promising Male Vocalist	Tex Pistol	Simon Alexandra; Lyonel Grant	
1986	Most Promising Female Vocalist	Tania Rowles	Ainsley Day; Liz Diamond	
1986	Most Promising Group	Ardijah	Chrome Safari; Wentworth Brewster & Co	
1987	Most Promising Male Vocalist	Al Hunter	Wayne Elliot (Knightshade); David Parker (Rhythm Cage)	
1987	Most Promising Female Vocalist	Moana	Darlene Adair; Kara Pewhairangi	
1987	Most Promising Group	Monga and Harwood	Rhythm Cage; Knightshade	
1988	Most Promising Male Vocalist	Peter Marshall	Rikki Morris; Thom Nepia	
1988	Most Promising Female Vocalist	Mara Finau	Tracey Birnie; Helen Mulholland	
1988	Most Promising Group	Holidaymakers	Straitjacket Fits; The Tunnellers	
1989	Most Promising Male Vocalist	Paul Ubana Jones	Greg Johnson; Darren Watson	
1989	Most Promising Female Artist	Janet Roddick	Belinda Bradley; Julie Collier	
1989	Most Promising Group	The Front Lawn	Double J and Twice the T; Upper Hutt Posse	
1990	Most Promising Male Vocalist	Guy Wishart	Alan Galloway; John Kempt	
1990	Most Promising Female Vocalist	Merenia	Ngaire; Caroline Easther	
1990	Most Promising Group	Strawpeople	Merenia & Where's Billy; D-Faction	
1991	No awards held			—N/a
1992	Most Promising Male Vocalist	David Parker (Parker Project)	Jon Toogood (Shihad); James Gaylyn	
1992	Most Promising Female Vocalist	Teremoana Rapley (Moana and the Moahunters)	Christina Fuemana (House Party); Lorina Harding	
1992	Most Promising Group	Shihad	The Exponents; These Wilding Ways	
1993	Most Promising Male Vocalist	Ted Brown	Jay Rei; Kevin Greaves	
1993	Most Promising Female Vocalist	Jan Hellriegel	Jules Issa; Maree Sheehan	
1993	Most Promising Group	Head Like a Hole	Dead Flowers; Kantuta	
1994	Most Promising Male Vocalist	Matty J (Matty J and the Soul Syndicate)	Michael Gregg and Brendan Gregg (Holy Toledos); Jason Ioasa (Grace)	
1994	Most Promising Female Vocalist	Emma Paki	Jan Preston; Rima Te Wiata	
1994	Most Promising Group	Urban Disturbance	Holy Toledos; The 3Ds	
1995	Most Promising Male Vocalist	Brent Milligan (Pumpkinhead)	Peter Daube (Bilge Festival); Evan Woodruffe (Melon Twister)	
1995	Most Promising Female Vocalist	Sulata Foai	Chloe Reeves; Helen Goudge (Melon Twister)	
1995	Most Promising Group	Sisters Underground	3 the Hard Way; Purest Form	
1996	Most Promising Male Vocalist	Pauly Fuemana (OMC)	Jeremy Eade (Garageland); Otis Frizzell (Joint Force)	
1996	Most Promising Female Vocalist	Bic Runga	Celia Mancini (King Loser); Jordan Reyne	
1996	Most Promising Group	OMC	Garageland; Joint Force	
1997	Most Promising Male Vocalist	Daniel Haimona (Dam Native)	Andrew Tilby (Breathe); Ed Cake (Bressa Creeting Cake)	
1997	Most Promising Female Vocalist	Lole Usoalii	Andrea Cook; Maryanne Antonuvich (D-Faction)	
1997	Most Promising Group	Dam Native	Bike; Bressa Creeting Cake; Cinematic	
1998	Most Promising Male Vocalist	Darcy Clay	Dave Yetton (The Stereo Bus); James Reid (The Feelers)	
1998	Most Promising Female Vocalist	Alesha Siosiua (Moizna)	Maisey Rika (St Joseph's Māori Girls' College); Jordan Reyne	
1998	Most Promising Group	Moizna	The Feelers; The Stereo Bus	
1999	Most Promising Male Vocalist	Andrew Tilby (Breathe)	King Kapisi; Nathan King (Zed)	
1999	Most Promising Female Vocalist	Boh Runga (Stellar)	Liz Faalogo (NV); Sina Saipaia	
1999	Most Promising Group	Stellar	Breathe; (Zed)	
2000	Most Promising Male Vocalist	Aaron Tokona (Weta)	Sama Feo (AKA Brown); Conan Wilcox (Salmonella Dub)	
2000	Most Promising Female Vocalist	Vanessa Kelly (Deep Obsession)	Maybelle Galuvao (Ma-V-Elle); Lavina Williams (The Invasion Band/Ma-V-Elle)	
2000	Most Promising Group	Weta	Breathe; AKA Brown	

=== Best New Act (2001-2002) ===
Year	Winner	Album	Other finalists	Ref.
2001	Betchadupa	—N/a	Splitter; Dan Sperber and Luke Casey	
2002	Goodshirt	Good	K'Lee - "Broken Wings"; Pluto - Redlight Syndrome	

=== Breakthrough Artist of the Year (2003-current) ===
Year	Winner	Album	Other finalists	Ref.
2003	The Datsuns	The Datsuns	Goldenhorse - Riverhead; Blindspott - Blindspott	
2004	Brooke Fraser	What to Do with Daylight	Minuit - The 88; Adeaze - Always and for Real	
2005	The Checks	"What You Heard"	Dei Hamo – First Edition; Tha Feelstyle – Break It to Pieces	
2006	Bleeders	As Sweet as Sin	Aaradhna - I Love You; Frontline - Borrowed Time	
2007	Hollie Smith	Long Player	Liam Finn - Second Chance; Atlas - "Crawl"	
2008	Flight of the Conchords	Flight of the Conchords	Cut Off Your Hands - Blue On Blue; Tiki Taane - Past, Present, Future	
2009	Ladyhawke	Ladyhawke	Midnight Youth; Smashproof	
2010	Gin Wigmore	Holy Smoke	Artisan Guns – Autumn; Dane Rumble – The Experiment	
2011	The Naked and Famous	Passive Me, Aggressive You	Six60 – "Rise Up 2.0"; Avalanche City – Our New Life Above The Ground	
2012	Kimbra	Vows	Annah Mac – Little Stranger; Home Brew – Home Brew	
2013	Lorde	The Love Club EP	Jamie McDell - Six Strings and a Sailboat; Willy Moon - Here's Willy Moon	
2014	Broods	Broods	Sol3 Mio; Doprah	
2015	Marlon Williams	Marlon Williams	Devilskin; Ginny Blackmore	
2016	Kings	"Don't Worry Bout It"	Leisure – "All Over You"; Nomad – "Oh My My"; SACHI – Lunch with Bianca (EP)	
2017	Aldous Harding	Party	Fazerdaze; Nadia Reid; Teeks	
2018	Drax Project		JessB; L.A.B.; Robinson	
2019	Benee	Fire on Marzz	Baynk; Church & AP; The Beths	
2020	Jawsh 685		Chaii; Melodownz; Paige	
2021	Harper Finn	"Dance Away These Days"	Foley; Muroki; Niko Walters	
2022	Georgia Lines	Human	Coterie; Jordan Rakei; There's a Tuesday	
2023	No awards held			
2024	COTERIE		9lives; Hori Shaw; MOHI; SXMPRA	
2025	Hori Shaw		DARTZ; A.R.T	
