= 2025 Aotearoa Music Awards =

New Zealand music award ceremony

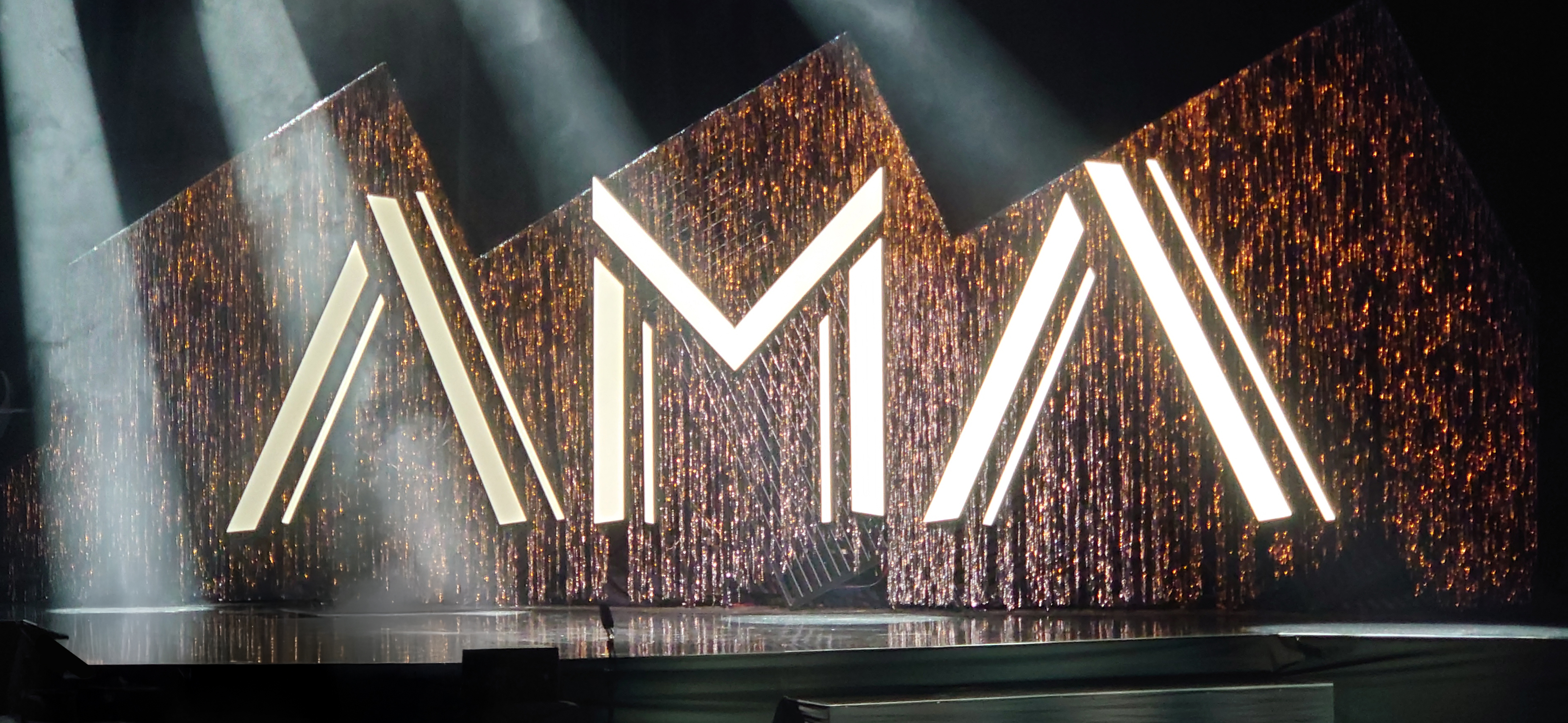
- The stage at the 2024 awards ceremony
- Awarded for: Excellence in New Zealand music
- Date: 29 May 2025
- Location: Viaduct Events Centre
- Presented by: Recorded Music NZ
- Hosted by: Jesse Mulligan & Kara Rickard
- Reward: Tūī trophy
- Website: Official website

Television/radio coverage
- Network: Radio NZ, TVNZ+

The 2025 Aotearoa Music Awards was the 58th holding of the annual ceremony featuring awards for New Zealand music recording artists, and the 60th anniversary of the awards. The ceremony took place on 29 May 2025 at the Viaduct Events Centre in Auckland and was hosted by Radio NZ presenters Jesse Mulligan and Kara Rickard.

The awards were live streamed by Radio New Zealand, and made available to watch the next day on TVNZ+.

The event was notable due to an incident where Chris Bishop was recorded calling a performance by Stan Walker "a load of crap" and the audience applause "performative acclaim". Bishop declined to apologise for the comments, saying he was frustrated by the "politicisation" of the performance, but admitted he should have kept it to himself. Bishop acknowledged he had consumed alcohol but denied he was intoxicated.

== Nominees and winners ==
Winners are listed first, highlighted in boldface, and indicated with a double dagger (‡).

Album of the Year Te Tino Pukaemi o te Tau	Single of the Year Te Tino Waiata Tōtahi o te Tau
**Fazerdaze** **– Soft Power**‡; Aaradhna – Sweet Surrender; Anna Coddington – Te Whakamiha; CHAII – Safar; Georgia Lines – The Rose Of Jericho; Jordan Rakei – The Loop; Kaylee Bell – Nights Like This; L.A.B – L.A.B VI; Mel Parsons – Sabotage; MOKOTRON – WAEREA; Tami Neilson – Neilson Sings Nelson; Troy Kingi – Leatherman and the Mojave Green	**Lorde** **– "Girl, So Confusing featuring Lorde" (Charli XCX, Lorde)**‡; Cassie Henderson – "Seconds To Midnight (11.59)"; CHAII – "We Be Killing It"; Fazerdaze – "Cherry Pie"; Georgia Lines – "The Letter"; JessB – "Power" (feat. Sister Nancy & Sampa the Great); Kaylee Bell – "Cowboy Up"; MOKOMOKAI – "KUPE" feat. MELODOWNZ; Reb Fountain – "Come Down"; Stan Walker – "Māori Ki Te Ao"; Theia – "BALDH3AD!"; Troy Kingi – "Silicone Booby Trap"
Best Solo Artist Te Tino Reo o te Tau	Best Group Te Tino Kāhui Manu Taki o te Tau
**Fazerdaze** **– Soft Power**‡; Aaradhna – Sweet Surrender; Georgia Lines – The Rose Of Jericho; Kaylee Bell – Nights Like This; MOKOTRON – WAEREA; Stan Walker	**Earth Tongue** **– Great Haunting**‡; Corrella – Skeletons; DARTZ – Dangerous Day To Be A Cold One; Foley; L.A.B – L.A.B VI; SKILAA – Tiger In The River
Best Māori Artist Te Manu Taki Māori o te Tau	Mana Reo Te Mangai Pāho Mana Reo
**Stan Walker**‡; Anna Coddington – Te Whakamiha; Corrella – Skeletons; Jordyn with a Why – Hibiscus Moon, Love & Justice; MOHI; TAWAZ	**Stan Walker** **– "Māori Ki Te Ao"**‡; Anna Coddington – Te Whakamiha; Haami Tuari – Taku Kaenga; Jordyn with a Why – "Reia"; TAWAZ – "Tātarakihi" (feat. MOHI); Tuari Brothers – "Higher"
Breakthrough Artist of the Year Te Iti Rearea o te Tau	Best Pop Artist Te Manu Taki Arotini o te Tau
**Hori Shaw**‡; A.R.T; DARTZ	**Cassie Henderson** **– The Yellow Chapter**‡; Frankie Venter; Georgia Lines – The Rose Of Jericho
Best Alternative Artist Te Manu Taki Whanokē o te Tau	Best Soul / RnB Artist Te Manu Taki Manako o te Tau
**Jim Nothing** **– Grey Eyes, Grey Lynn**‡; Louisa Nicklin – The Big Sulk; Vera Ellen – heartbreak for jetlag	**Aaradhna – Sweet Surrender**‡; Sam V; Stan Walker
Best Hip Hop Artist Te Manu Taki Ātete o te Tau	Best Roots Artist Te Manu Taki Taketake o te Tau
**David Dallas** **– Vita** ‡; Jujulipps – Superstar; RNZŌ	**Corrella – Skeletons**‡; Christoph El Truento – Dubs From The Neighbourhood; Lomez Brown
Best Rock Artist Te Manu Taki Rakapioi o te Tau	Best Electronic Artist Te Manu Taki Tāhiko o te Tau
**DARTZ – Dangerous Day To Be A Cold One**‡; Devilskin – Surfacing; Troy Kingi – Leatherman And The Mojave Green	**MOKOTRON** **– WAEREA**‡; CHAII – Safar; Lee Mvtthews – EXIT
Best Classical Artist Te Manu Taki Tuauki o te Tau	Te Manu Mātarae
**Jian Liu – Where Fairburn Walked**‡; Justin DeHart – Towards Midnight: NZ Percussion Vol 2; Michael Houstoun – The Well-Tempered Clavier	**9lives**; **L.A.B**

=== Additional awards ===
The following awards were also presented:

Best Country Artist Te Manu Taki Tuawhenua o te Tau	Best Folk Artist Te Manu Taki Ahurea o te Tau
**Tami Neilson** **– Neilson Sings Nelson**‡; Barry Saunders and Delaney Davidson – Happiness Is Near; Kaylee Bell – Nights Like This	**Holly Arrowsmith – Blue Dreams**‡; Kerryn Fields – The Folk Singer; Mel Parsons – Sabotage
Best Children's Music Artist Te Manu Taki Kerekahu o te Tau	Best Jazz Artist (Te Kaipuoro Tautito Toa)
**Claudia Robin Gunn**‡	**Lucien Johnson – Ancient Relics**‡; Thabani Gapara – Dzindza; Umar Zakaria – Family Music

=== Artisan awards ===
Best Album Artwork Te Taumata o te Toi	Best Music Video Content Te Taumata o te Ataata
**Matt Sinclair – Neilson Sings Nelson (Tami Neilson)**‡; Emma Hercus – Sabotage (Mel Parsons); Natalie King, Chris Schmelz – Uneven Ground (Death and the Maiden)	**Oscar Keys, Ezra Simons, Kristin Li – "Paradise" (DARTZ)**‡; CHAII – "Night Like This" (CHAII); Night Watch – "Nightshift" (Jujulipps)
Best Producer Te Taumata o te Kaiwhakaputa	Best Engineer Te Taumata o te Pūkenga Oro
**Nic Manders – The Rose Of Jericho (Georgia Lines)**‡; CHAII, Frank Keys – Safar (CHAII); Rory Noble	**Simon Gooding – Safar (CHAII)**‡; Emily Wheatcroft – Snape, Amelia Murray – Soft Power (Fazerdaze); Nic Manders – The Rose Of Jericho (Georgia Lines)

=== Special awards ===
People's Choice Award
Tā te Iwi
- **Devilskin**‡
Highest Selling Artist

Te Taumata o te Hokona

- **Six60**‡
Radio Airplay Record of the Year

Te Taumata o te Horapa

- **"Take It Away" – L.A.B**‡
