= 2022 Aotearoa Music Awards =

New Zealand music award ceremony

- Awarded for: Excellence in New Zealand music
- Date: 10 November 2022
- Website: Official website

The 2022 Aotearoa Music Awards was the 56th holding of the annual ceremony featuring awards for musical recording artists based in or originating from New Zealand. Due to the ongoing COVID-19 pandemic, there was no traditional celebration or televised awards ceremony. The winners were publicly announced on 10 November, 2022.

The finalists were announced on 6 October 2022. Rob Ruha received the most nominations with six, followed by Ka Hao with five and L.A.B. with four. The latter were the night's biggest winners and repeated their 2021 success by winning Album of the Year, Single of the Year, Best Group, and Best Roots Artist for a second year in a row. Other notable winners included Tami Neilson, with three award wins, and Benee, who won Best Pop Artist for a fourth successive year.

== Nominees and winners ==
Winners are listed first, highlighted in boldface, and indicated with a double dagger (‡).

Album of the Year (Te Pukaemi o te Tau)	Single of the Year (Te Waiata Tōtahi o te Tau)
**L.A.B. V – L.A.B.**‡; Aldous Harding – Warm Chris; Lorde – Solar Power; Reb Fountain – IRIS; Rob Ruha – Preservation of Scenery; Tami Neilson – Kingmaker	**"Mr Reggae" – L.A.B.**‡; Ka Hao – "35" (ft. Rob Ruha); Marlon Williams – "My Boy"; Reb Fountain – "Lacuna"; Rob Ruha – "That's Where I'll Be"; The Beths – "Silence is Golden"
Best Solo Artist (Te Kaipuoro Takitahi Toa)	Best Māori Artist (Te Māngai Pāho Te Kaipuoro Māori Toa)
**Tami Neilson**‡; Lorde; Reb Fountain; Rob Ruha	**Ka Hao**‡; Rob Ruha; Stan Walker
Best Group (Te Roopu Toa)	Breakthrough Artist of the Year (Te Kaituhura Puoro Toa o te Tau)
**L.A.B.**‡; Alien Weaponry; Fat Freddy's Drop; Ka Hao	**Georgia Lines**‡; COTERIE; Jordan Rakei; There's a Tuesday
Best Pop Artist (Te Kaipuoro Arotini Toa)	Best Alternative Artist (Te Kaipuoro Manohi Toa)
**Benee**‡; Georgia Lines; Lorde	**Vera Ellen**‡; Ben Woods; Te Kaahu
Best Soul / RnB Artist (Te Kaipuoro Awe Toa)	Best Hip Hop Artist (Te Kaipuoro Hipihope Toa)
**Rob Ruha**‡; Jackson Owens; Jordan Rakei	**Diggy Dupé, choicevaughan and P. Smith** ‡; CHAII; Christoph El Truento and Lucky Lance
Best Roots Artist (Te Kaipuoro Taketake Toa)	Te Māngai Pāho Mana Reo Award
**L.A.B.**‡; Ka Hao; The Black Seeds	**Rob Ruha – "Preservation of Scenery"**‡; Ka Hao – "35" (ft Rob Ruha); Troy Kingi – "Pū Whenua Hautapu, Eka Mumura"
Best Electronic Artist (Te Kaipuoro Tāhiko Toa)	Best Rock Artist (Te Kaipuoro Rakapioi Toa)
**LEAPING TIGER**‡; Julien Dyne; TALI	**Alien Weaponry**‡; Shihad; Sit Down In Front
Best Classical Artist (Te Kaipuoro Inamata Toa)
**Robert Ashworth & Sarah Watkins**‡; Bridget Douglas and Al Fraser; NZTrio

=== Additional awards ===
The following awards were also presented:

Best Country Artist (Te Kaipuoro Tuawhenua Toa)	Best Folk Artist (Te Kaipuoro Taketake Toa)
**Tami Neilson – Kingmaker**‡; Jenny Mitchell – Tug Of War; Kaylee Bell – Silver Linings	**Troy Kingi – Black Sea Golden Ladder**‡; Miles Calder – Autopilot Life; We Mavericks – Grief's a Gardner
Best Children's Music Artist (Te Kaipuoro Waiata Tamariki Toa)	Best Jazz Artist (Te Kaipuoro Tautito Toa)
**Music With Michal – Summer Days**‡; Itty Bitty Beats – Itty Bitty Bubbles; Levity Beet – Bamboo Banger Collection	**Myele Manzanza – Crisis & Opportunity Vol.1**‡; Devil's Gate Outfit; Jake Baxendale & Jasmine Lovell-Smith

=== Artisan awards ===
Best Album Artwork (Te Kaipuoro Tāhiko Toa)	Best Music Video Content (Te Kiko Puoro Ataata Toa)
**Chelsea Jade Metcalf for Soft Spot by Chelsea Jade**‡; Barny Bewick & Lewis De Jong for Tangaroa by Alien Weaponry; Maria Francesca Melis for Kingmaker by Tami Neilson	**Joel Kefali and Ella Yelich-O'Connor for "Secrets from a Girl (Who's Seen It All)" by Lorde**‡; Alyx Duncan for "Kingmaker" by Tami Neilson; Nicole Horan, Marara Katipa, Danhu Graham, Hayden Aull, Thomas Rose, Huhana Ruri-Panapa, and Xavier Horan for Black Sea Golden Ladder: The Visual Album by Troy Kingi
Best Producer (Te Kaiwhakaputa Toa)	Best Engineer (Te Kaipukaha Toa)
**Tami Neilson for Kingmaker by Tami Neilson**‡; CHAII/Frank Keys/Rory Noble for Pineapple Pizza by CHAII; choicevaughn/Diggy Dupé/P Smith for The Panthers OST by choicevaughn/Diggy Dupé/P Smith	**Simon Gooding for Kingmaker by Tami Neilson**‡; Lee Prebble and Ara Adams-Tamatea for L.A.B. V by L.A.B.; Simon Gooding for Iris by Reb Fountain

=== Special awards ===
People's Choice Award
(Te Kōwhiri o te Nuinga)
- **Ka Hao**‡
Highest Selling Artist
(Te Toa Hoko Teitei)
- **Six60**‡
Radio Airplay Record of the Year
(Te Rikoata Marakerake o te Tau)
- **"Someone To Be Around" – Six60**‡
