= Electric Avenue (festival) =

New Zealand music festival

- Logo of the festival in 2025
- Locations: Christchurch, New Zealand
- Years active: 2015–present
- Next event: 27–28 February 2026
- Attendance: 70,000
- Website: electricavenuefestival.co.nz

Electric Avenue is an annual summer music festival held in February each year in Hagley Park, in Christchurch, New Zealand.

== History ==
The festival launched on Waitangi Day (6 February) 2015 with local headliners including Shapeshifter, Fat Freddy's Drop, and Ladi6. 8,000 people attended in the first year.

In January 2022, the planned festival on 26 February was cancelled due to an outbreak of the Omicron variant of COVID-19. At the time, it was described as New Zealand's largest one-day music festival, and over 90 percent of tickets had been sold.

In 2025, it became a two day festival, attracting 70,000 people. Later in 2025, the company that organised the festival—Team Event— sold part of EA to international event promoter Live Nation.

Demand for tickets was at an all-time high when presale for the 2026 event were happening, resulting in comments of those who missed out on tickets to described the process as a "shambles", reporting a range of technical glitches that prevented purchases going through.

== Line-ups ==
=== 2015 ===
The 2015 event was the first of this event and took place on 6 February 2015 and featured artists including Rüfüs Du Sol, Shapeshifter, Fat Freddy's Drop, Dub FX. The Correspondents, State of Mind, Ladi6, AHoriBuzz, Electric Wire Hustle, Cairo Knife Fight, Truth and many more.

=== 2016 ===
The 2016 event took place on 6 February 2016 and featured artists including Thievery Corporation, The Freestylers, The Presets, The Cuban Brothers, Norman Jay MBE, Sneaky Sound System, Boy & Bear, P-Money, The Correspondents, Kora, Katchafire, The Upbeats and many more.

=== 2017 ===
The 2017 event took place on 25 February 2017 and featured artists including Hermitude, Shihad, Dub FX & Tiki Taane, Chali 2na & Krafty Kuts, Shapeshifter, David Dallas, Maala, Safia, Pitch Black, Mt Eden, Ragga Twins, Dub Pistols, My Baby, Cleopold, Summer Thieves, Opiuo, and many more.

=== 2018 ===
The 2018 event took place on 24 February 2018 and featured artists including Dizzie Rascal, Hermitude, Chase & Status (DJ Set), Primal Scream, L.A.B, Confidence Man, Sneaky Sound System, The D4, My Baby, Katchafire, Too Many Zooz, Chronixx, K+Lab, Dillastrate, The Salad Boys, Aaradhna and many more.

=== 2019 ===
The 2019 event took place on 23 February 2019 and featured artists including Netsky, Orbital, Aloe Blacc, Rudimental (DJ Set), Shapeshifter, L.A.B, Riton & Kah-Lo, Client Liaison, JessB, My Baby, David Rodigan, David Dallas, The Correspondents, Leisure, Estère, Aroha & Tali and many more.

=== 2020 ===
The 2020 event took place on 22 February 2020 and featured artists including Pendulum Trinity, Matt Corby, Gang of Youths, Ben Harper & The Innocent Criminals, Parov Stelar Band, Brass Against, Drax Project, Confidence Man, Home Brew, J:Kenzo, Lime Cordiale, Pitch Black, Ragga Twins, Running Touch, Savage, The Black Seeds, Nyxen, The Butlers, The Upbeats and many more.

=== 2021 ===
The 2021 event took place on 27 February 2021 and featured artists including Netsky, Benee, L.A.B, Fat Freddy's Drop, Shapeshifter, Synthony, Kora, Scribe & P-Money, Salmonella Dub ft. Tiki Taane, Ladi6, JessB, State of Mind, Sachi Mild Orange, Bootleg Rascal, Chaii, Deadbeat, Bailey Waley, Riiki Reid and many more.

=== 2022 ===
The 2022 was scheduled to take place on 26 February 2022 but was cancelled due to the Omicron outbreak.

=== 2023 ===
The 2023 event took place on 26 February 2024 and featured artists including Lorde, Flume, Sub Focus, L.A.B, Fat Freddy's Drop, Synthony, Peking Duk, Future Islands, Teeks, Drax Project, Lee Mvtthews, Baker Boy, Client Liaison, Montell2099, Supergroove, Summer Thieves, Dillinja, The Black Seeds, Sachi, Harper Finn, Odd Mob, Pitch Black, Muroki, Sycco and many more.

=== 2024 ===
The 2024 event took place on 24 February 2024 and featured artists including The Chemical Brothers, Six60, Hybrid Minds, L.A.B, Shapeshifter, Synthony No 2., Lime Cordiale, Flight Facilities, Lee Mvtthews, Cosmo's Midnight, ShockOne, KC Lights, Greentea Peng, Luca George, Cassie Henderson, JessB, The Rions, Lady Shaka, Opiuo, Fleetmac Wood, Rei and many more.

=== 2025 ===
The 2025 event took place for the first time on 2 days on 21 and 22 February 2025, and attracted 70,000 fans. It featured artists such as The Prodigy, Chase & Status, Wilkinson, Empire of the Sun, Khruangbin, The Kooks, L.A.B, Rudimental, Shapeshifter ft. Ladi6 & Synthony, Kaleo, Peking Duk, Mall Grab, Fat Freddy's Drop, Maribou State, Jordan Rakei, The Jungle Giants, Bag Raiders, DJ Shadow, Ladi6, Coterie, Isabel LaRosa, Fleetmac Wood and others.

=== 2026 ===
The 2026 event was announced to include the reunion of popular New Zealand band Split Enz, as well as major international acts such as Dom Dolla, Kesha, Pendulum, Basement Jaxx, and others. New Zealand acts included L.A.B., Supergroove, Shapeshifter, and others.
