= Aotearoa Music Award for Best Music Video =

Best Music Video is an Aotearoa Music Award that honours New Zealand artists for excellence in music video production. The award was first presented in 1983 and is given to the video director. Previous winners have included feature film directors Niki Caro, Jonathan King and Chris Graham, and acclaimed artist Fane Flaws. The most wins have gone to Joe Lonie (aka Jo Fisher) who won three time for Supergroove videos and a fourth for Goodshirt. In 2012 all three nominees went to Special Problems, the creative partnership of Joel Kefali and Campbell Hooper.

== Recipients ==
Year	Director	Song	Other nominees	Ref
1983	Andrew Shaw	"Outlook For Thursday" (DD Smash)	Greg Rood - "Sierra Leone" (Coconut Rough); Mark Ackerman, Craig Howard - "Shoop Shoop Diddy Wop Cumma Cumma Wang Dang" (Monte Video and the Cassettes)	
1984	Bruce Morrison	"I'm In Heaven" (Dave McArtney & The Pink Flamingos)	William Keddell - "Elephunk In My Soup" (Low Profile); Tom Parkinson - "I'll Say Goodbye (Even Though I'm Blue)" (Dance Exponents)	
1985	Fane Flaws	"Diamonds On China" (The Narcs)	Debra Bustin - "Krazy Legs" (The Pelicans); Roger Guise - "I Like to Drive" (Scotty & Co)	
1986	Kerry Brown	"As the Sun Goes Down" (Everything That Flies)	Stuart Dryburgh - "Good Luck To You" (Peking Man); Fetus Productions, MEC - "Flicker" (Fetus Productions)	
1987	Matt Box Films	"Sensitive to a Smile" (Herbs)	Kerry Brown, Bruce Sheridan - "(Glad I'm) Not A Kennedy" (Shona Laing); Paul Middleditch - "The Game of Love" (Tex Pistol)	
1988	Fane Flaws	"Sweet Lovers" (Holidaymakers)	Janine Morell - "Haere Mai" (Cara Pewhairangi); Paul Middleditch - "Nobody Else" (Tex Pistol and Rikki Morris)	
1989	Paul Middleditch, Polly Walker, Debbie Watson	"I Feel Love" (Fan Club)	Warrick (Waka) Attewell - "St Peter's Rendezvous" (Barry Saunders); Tony Johns - "She's A Mod/Mod Rap" (Double J and Twice the T)	
1990	Niki Caro	"Bad Note for a Heart" (Straitjacket Fits)	Paul Middleditch - "One Good Reason" (Strawpeople); Lance Kelliher - "Don't Let Me Fall Alone" (Fan Club)	
1991	No awards held this year			
1992	Mauger Bros	"Trippin’" (Push Push)	Kerry Brown - "AEIOU" (Moana and the Moahunters); Bruce Sheridan. Rachael Churchward "Cruise Control" (Headless Chickens)	
1993	Kerry Brown, Bruce Sheridan	"Four Seasons in One Day" (Crowded House)	Fane Flaws - "Nature" (The Mutton Birds); Nigel Streeter - "Fish Across Face" (Head Like A Hole)	
1994	Matt Noonan, Josh Frizzell	"System Virtue" (Emma Paki)	Fane Flaws - "The Beautiful Things" (The Front Lawn); Johnny Ogilvie - "Mr. Moon" (Headless Chickens)	
1995	Jo Fisher, Matt Noonan	"Can't Get Enough" (Supergroove)	Johnny Ogilvy - "Cruise Control" (Headless Chickens); Gideon Keith, Marcus Ringrose, Stephen McGlashan - "George" (Headless Chickens)	
1996	Sigi Spath, Jo Fisher	"You Gotta Know" (Supergroove)	Greg Page - "Honeyblonde" (Throw); Matt Noonan, Josh Frizzell - "Static: Part One" (Joint Force)	
1997	Sigi Spath, Joe Lonie	"If I Had My Way" (Supergroove)	Kevin Sprig - "La La Land" (Shihad); Jonathan King - "Behold My Kool Style" (Dam Native)	
1998	Mark Hurley	"Home Again" (Shihad)	Joe Lonie - "Pressure Man" (The Feelers); Wayne Conway - "Suddenly Strange" (Bic Runga)	
1999	Reuben Sutherland	"Wait and See" (Shihad)	Sima Urale, Makerita Urale - "Sub-Cranium Feeling" (King Kapisi); Mark Tierney, Fiona Champtaloup - "Unlikely" (NV)	
2000	Reuben Sutherland	"My Mind's Sedate" (Shihad)	Marc Swadel - "Birthday" (The Stereo Bus); Jonathan King - "Violent" (Stellar)	
2001	Alex Sutherland, Michael Lonsdale	"Touchdown" (The Stereo Bus)	Greg Page - "One Day Ahead" (Eye TV); Wade Shotter, Jamie Dower - "Silent Film" (Augustino)	
2002	Matthew Metcalfe, Greg Rewai	"Fade Away" (Che Fu)	Garry Sullivan - "Seed" (Dimmer); Ed Davis, Paul McLaney - "Complicated" (Gramsci)	
2003	Joe Lonie	"Sophie" (Goodshirt)	Che Fu - "Misty Frequencies" (Che Fu); Chris Graham, Bic Runga - "Something Good" (Bic Runga)	
2004	Chris Graham	"Stand Up" (Scribe)	Gary Sullivan - "Getting What You Give" (Dimmer); Mark Trethewey, Shane Mason - "Fools Love" (Misfits of Science)	
2005	Chris Graham	"We Gon' Ride" (Dei Hamo)	Greg Page – "Stop the Music" (P-Money); Reuben Sutherland – "Hitchcock" (The Phoenix Foundation)	
2006	Mark Williams	"Wandering Eye" (Fat Freddy's Drop)	Alyx Duncan - "Fuji" (Minuit); Adam Jones - "Long White Cross" (Pluto)	
2007	Sam Peacocke	"Crazy? Yes! Dumb? No!" (The Mint Chicks)	Angus Sutherland, Liam Finn - "Second Chance" (Liam Finn); Stephen Tolfrey - "Maybe" (Opshop)	
2008	Ian Hart	"Her Hairagami Set" (The Brunettes)	Carey Carter - "Tangaroa" (Tiki Taane); Joe Lonie - "Gather to the Chapel" (Liam Finn)	
2009	Chris Graham	"Brother" (Smashproof featuring Gin Wigmore)	Sam Peacocke - "I Can't Stop Being Foolish" (The Mint Chicks); Tim Van Dammen - "Turn Around" (Sola Rosa featuring Iva Lamkum)	
2010	Tim Van Dammen	"Just a Little Bit" (Kids of 88)	Nathan Hickey - "Buffalo" (The Phoenix Foundation); Sam Peacocke - "Sleepeater" (Shihad)	
2011	Special Problems	"Punching in a Dream" (The Naked and Famous)	Special Problems – "Broken Machine" (Zowie); Faye McNeil – "Like Water" (Ladi6)	
2012	Special Problems	"The Sun" (The Naked and Famous)	Special Problems – "Take a Picture" (David Dallas); Special Problems – "My Calculator" (Zowie)	
2013	Joel Kefali	"Royals" (Lorde)	Nick Dwyer – "In Colour" (Shapeshifter); Thunderlips – "Frankenstein" (Randa)	
2014	Campbell Hooper	"Hearts Like Ours" (The Naked and Famous)	Tom Gould - "Runnin'" (David Dallas); Thunderlips - "Stranger People" (Doprah)	
2015	Shahir Daud	"Cymatics" (Nigel Stanford)	Reuben Bonner – "Her Heart Breaks Like a Wave" (Dictaphone Blues); Shae Sterling – "Aotearoa" (Stan Walker featuring Ria Hall, Troy Kingi & Maisey Rika)	
2016	Chris Lane	"Inside Out" (Avalanche City)	Sam Peacocke – "Buried by the Burden" ([Pacific Heights Ft. Louis Baker); Simon Oliver – "Secret Lives of Furniture" (Ha the Unclear)	
2017	Joel Kefali	"Got It Bad" (Leisure)	Dan Watkins – Her (Shapeshifter); Sam Kristofski – Lucky Girl (Fazerdaze)	
2021	Alexander Gander	"No One Knows" (Georgia Lines)	Anahera Parata – "Brighter Day" (Louis Baker); Connor Pritchard – "Money" (MELODOWNZ)	
2022	Joel Kefali and Ella Yelich-O’Connor	"Secrets from a Girl (Who’s Seen It All)" (Lorde)	Nicole Horan, Marara Katipa, Dahnu Graham, Hayden Aull, Thomas Rose, Huhana Ruri-Panapa, Xavier Horan – "Black Sea Golden Ladder: The Visual Album" (Troy Kingi); Alyx Duncan – "Kingmaker" (Tami Neilson)	
2024	Anahera Parata	"SHE" (Aaradhna)	Connor Pritchard – "All My Friends" (NO COMPLY ft. Wells*); Marlon Williams – "Don't Go Back" (Marlon Williams)	
2025	Oscar Keys, Ezra Simons, Kristin Li	"Paradise" (DARTZ)	CHAII – "Night Like This" (CHAII); Night Watch – "Nightshift" (Jujulipps)	
