= Aotearoa Music Award for Album of the Year =

Annual New Zealand music award

Te Tino Pukaemi o te Tau Album of the Year
- Previous: 2025; 29 May 2025
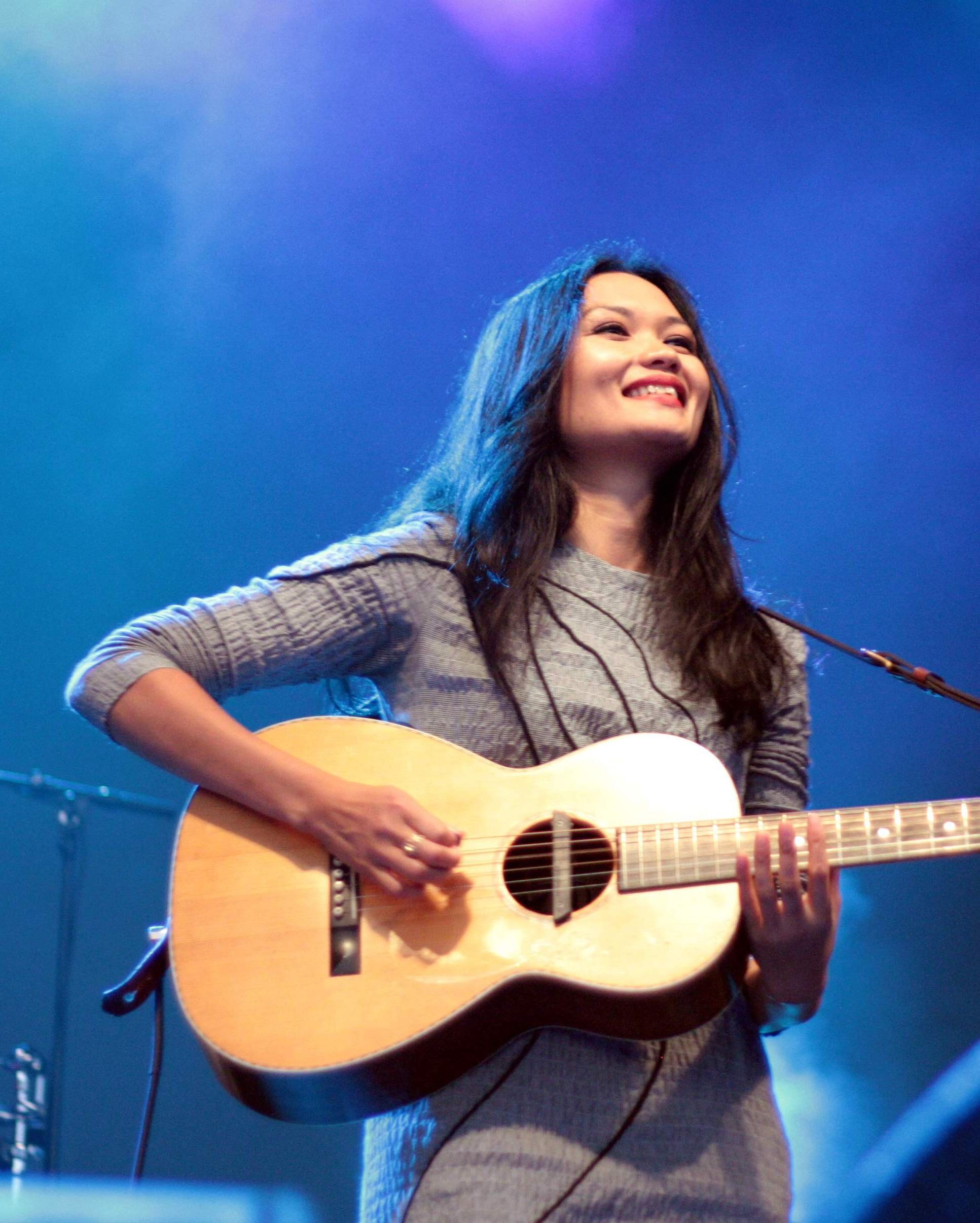
- Bic Runga has won the award twice
- Awarded for: Excellence in New Zealand Music
- Sponsored by: NZ On Air
- Presented by: Recorded Music NZ
- First award: 1973
- Currently held by: Soft Power – Fazerdaze

Album of the Year (Māori: Te Tino Pukaemi o te Tau) is an Aotearoa Music Award that honours New Zealand music artists for outstanding album. The award was first awarded in 1973 as part of the Recording Arts Talent Awards (RATA).

Singer-songwriter Bic Runga has won the award twice, in 1998 and 2006, while singer-songwriter Dave Dobbyn has won once as a solo artist in 1998 and twice with his band DD Smash in 1982 and 1983.

The award is sponsored by NZ On Air.

== Recipients ==
Year	Winner	Album	Other finalists	Ref.
1973	John Donoghue	Spirit of Pelorus Jack	—N/a	
1974	No Album of the Year awarded			
1975	John Hanlon	Higher Trails	—N/a	
1976	New Zealand Symphony Orchestra	Symphony #2	—N/a	
1977	No awards held			
1978	Hello Sailor	Hello Sailor	—N/a	
1979	Street Talk	Street Talk	—N/a	
1980	Sharon O'Neill	Sharon O'Neill	—N/a	
1981	Dave McArtney and the Pink Flamingos	Dave McArtney and the Pink Flamingos	Dennis O'Brien - Still in the Same Dream; Hammond Gamble - Hammond Gamble Band	
1982	DD Smash	Cool Bananas	—N/a	
1983	DD Smash	Live: Deep in the Heart of Taxes	Herbs - Light of the Pacific; Dance Exponents/The Legionnaires - Live at Mainstreet	
1984	Dance Exponents	Prayers Be Answered	The Mockers - Swear It's True; Patsy Riggir - You'll Never Take The Country Out Of Me	
1985	Netherworld Dancing Toys	Painted Years	Shona Laing - Genre; Herbs - Long Ago	
1986	Peking Man	Peking Man	The Verlaines - Hallelujah All the Way Home; Patsy Riggir - Patsy Riggir Country	
1987	Herbs	Sensitive to a Smile	Dave Dobbyn - Footrot Flats: The Dog's Tale; Ardijah - Ardijah	
1988	Dave Dobbyn	Loyal	Shona Laing - South; The Warratahs - Only Game in Town	
1989	Margaret Urlich	Safety In Numbers	Fan Club - Respect the Beat; The Front Lawn - Songs from the Front Lawn	
1990	The Chills	Submarine Bells	Brian Smith - Moonlight Sax; Straitjacket Fits - Melt	
1991	No awards held			
1992	Headless Chickens	Body Blow	Midge Marsden - Burning Rain; MC OJ & Rhythm Slave - What Can We Say?	
1993	The Mutton Birds	The Mutton Birds	Jan Hellriegel - It's My Sin; Shona Laing - New on Earth	
1994	Straitjacket Fits	Blow	Strawpeople - World Service; The 3Ds - The Venus Trail	
1995	Supergroove	Traction	The Mutton Birds - Salty; Dave Dobbyn - Twist; Head Like A Hole - Flik Y'Self Off Y'Self; Shona Laing - Shona	
1996	Shihad	Killjoy	Finn Brothers - Finn; Howard Morrison - Songs of New Zealand; Max Lines - Beautiful Panflute I; Starlight String Quartet - Romantic Strings; Suzanne Prentice - 25th Anniversary Album	
1997	Strawpeople	Vicarious	Emma Paki - Oxygen of Love; Garageland - Last Exit to Garageland; OMC - How Bizarre; The Mutton Birds - Envy of Angels	
1998	Bic Runga	Drive	Salmonella Dub - Calming of the Drunken Monkey; Rob Guest - Standing Ovation; The Stereo Bus - The Stereo Bus; Greg Johnson - Chinese Whispers	
1999	The Feelers	Supersystem	Che Fu - 2b S.Pacific; Neil Finn - Try Whistling This	
2000	Stellar	Mix	Shihad - The General Electric; Ardijah - Time; Salmonella Dub - Killervision; The Mutton Birds - Rain, Steam and Speed	
2001	Zed	Silencer	Dave Dobbyn - Hopetown; Fur Patrol - Pet; Tadpole - The Buddhafinger; Tim Finn, Dave Dobbyn, Bic Runga - Together in Concert: Live	
2002	Che Fu	The Navigator	Anika Moa - Thinking Room; Neil Finn - One Nil; Salmonella Dub - Inside the Dub Plates; The Feelers - Communicate	
2003	The Datsuns	The Datsuns	Pacifier - Pacifier; Goldenhorse - Riverhead; Bic Runga - Beautiful Collision; Nesian Mystik - Polysaturated	
2004	Scribe	The Crusader	Brooke Fraser - What to Do with Daylight; Dimmer - You've Got to Hear the Music; Goodshirt - Fiji Baby; The Phoenix Foundation - Horsepower	
2005	Fat Freddy's Drop	Based on a True Story	Breaks Co-Op - The Sound Inside; Finn Brothers - Everyone Is Here; Shihad - Love Is the New Hate; The Phoenix Foundation - Pegasus	
2006	Bic Runga	Birds	Don McGlashan - Warm Hand; Dave Dobbyn - Available Light; Concord Dawn - Chaos by Design; Elemeno P - Trouble in Paradise	
2007	The Mint Chicks	Crazy? Yes! Dumb? No!	Brooke Fraser - Albertine; Evermore - Real Life; Hollie Smith - Long Player; Opshop - Second Hand Planet	
2008	Flight of the Conchords	Flight of the Conchords	Anika Moa - In Swings the Tide; Liam Finn - I'll Be Lightning; Scribe - Rhyme Book; Tiki Taane - Past, Present, Future	
2009	Ladyhawke	Ladyhawke	The Mint Chicks - Screens; Midnight Youth - The Brave Don't Run; Cut Off Your Hands - You & I; Fat Freddy's Drop - Dr Boondigga and the Big BW	
2010	Gin Wigmore	Holy Smoke	Anika Moa - Love in Motion; Dane Rumble - The Experiment; Shapeshifter - The System Is a Vampire; The Phoenix Foundation – Buffalo	
2011	The Naked and Famous	Passive Me, Aggressive You	Ladi6 – The Liberation Of...; Brooke Fraser – Flags; Avalanche City – Our New Life Above The Ground; David Dallas – The Rose Tint	
2012	Kimbra	Vows	Home Brew – Home Brew; Opossum – Electric Hawaii; Six60 – Six60; The Adults – The Adults	
2013	Aaradhna	Treble & Reverb	Fat Freddy's Drop – Blackbird; Shapeshifter – Delta; The Phoenix Foundation – Fandango; Unknown Mortal Orchestra – II	
2014	Lorde	Pure Heroine	Tiny Ruins - Brightly Painted One; The Naked and Famous - In Rolling Waves; Sol3 Mio - Sol3 Mio; Ladi6 - Automatic	
2015	Broods	Evergreen	Marlon Williams – Marlon Williams; Shihad – FVEY; Six60 – Six60; Unknown Mortal Orchestra – Multi-Love	
2016	Broods	Conscious	Aaradhna – Brown Girl; Fat Freddy's Drop – Bays; Hollie Smith – Water or Gold; Tami Neilson – Don't Be Afraid; The Phoenix Foundation – Give Up Your Dreams	
2017	Lorde	Melodrama	Aldous Harding – Party; David Dallas – Hood Country Club; Fazerdaze – Morningside; Leisure – Leisure; SWIDT – Stoneyhunga	
2018	Marlon Williams	Make Way for Love	Alien Weaponry – Tū; Julia Deans – We Light Fire; Six60 – Six60 EP; Tami Neilson – Sassafrass!; Unknown Mortal Orchestra – Sex & Food	
2019	Avantdale Bowling Club	Avantdale Bowling Club	Aldous Harding – Designer; The Beths – Future Me Hates Me; Broods – Don't Feed the Pop Monster; Mitch James – Mitch James; Marlon Williams – Live at Auckland Town Hall	
2020	The Beths	Jump Rope Gazers	L.A.B. – L.A.B III; Nadia Reid – Out of My Province; Reb Fountain – Reb Fountain; Six60 – Six60; Tami Neilson – Chickaboom!	
2021	L.A.B.	L.A.B. IV	Benee – Hey U X; Crowded House - Dreamers Are Waiting; The Phoenix Foundation - Friend Ship; Teeks - Something to Feel; Troy Kingi - The Ghost of Freddie Cesar	
2022	L.A.B.	L.A.B. V	Rob Ruha – Preservation of Scenery; Tami Neilson – Kingmaker; Lorde – Solar Power; Reb Fountain – Iris; Aldous Harding – Warm Chris	
2023	No awards held			
2024	The Beths	Expert In A Dying Field	Avantdale Bowling Club – TREES; COTERIE – COTERIE; Erny Belle – Not Your Cupid; Home Brew – Run It Back; LEISURE – Leisurevision; Marlon Williams – My Boy; Paige – King Clown; Princess Chelsea – Everything Is Going To Be Alright; Stan Walker – All In; The Beths – Expert in a Dying Field; Tiny Ruins – Ceremony; Unknown Mortal Orchestra – V	
2025	Fazerdaze	Soft Power	Aaradhna — Sweet Surrender; Anna Coddington — Te Whakamiha; CHAII — Safar; Georgia Lines — The Rose Of Jericho; Jordan Rakei — The Loop; Kaylee Bell — Nights Like This; L.A.B — L.A.B VI; Mel Parsons — Sabotage; MOKOTRON — WAEREA; Tami Neilson — Neilson Sings Nelson; Troy Kingi — Leatherman And The Mojave Green	
