= Aotearoa Music Award for Best Pop Artist =

Annual New Zealand music award

Te Manu Taki Arotini o te Tau Best Pop Artist
- Previous: 2025 AMAs
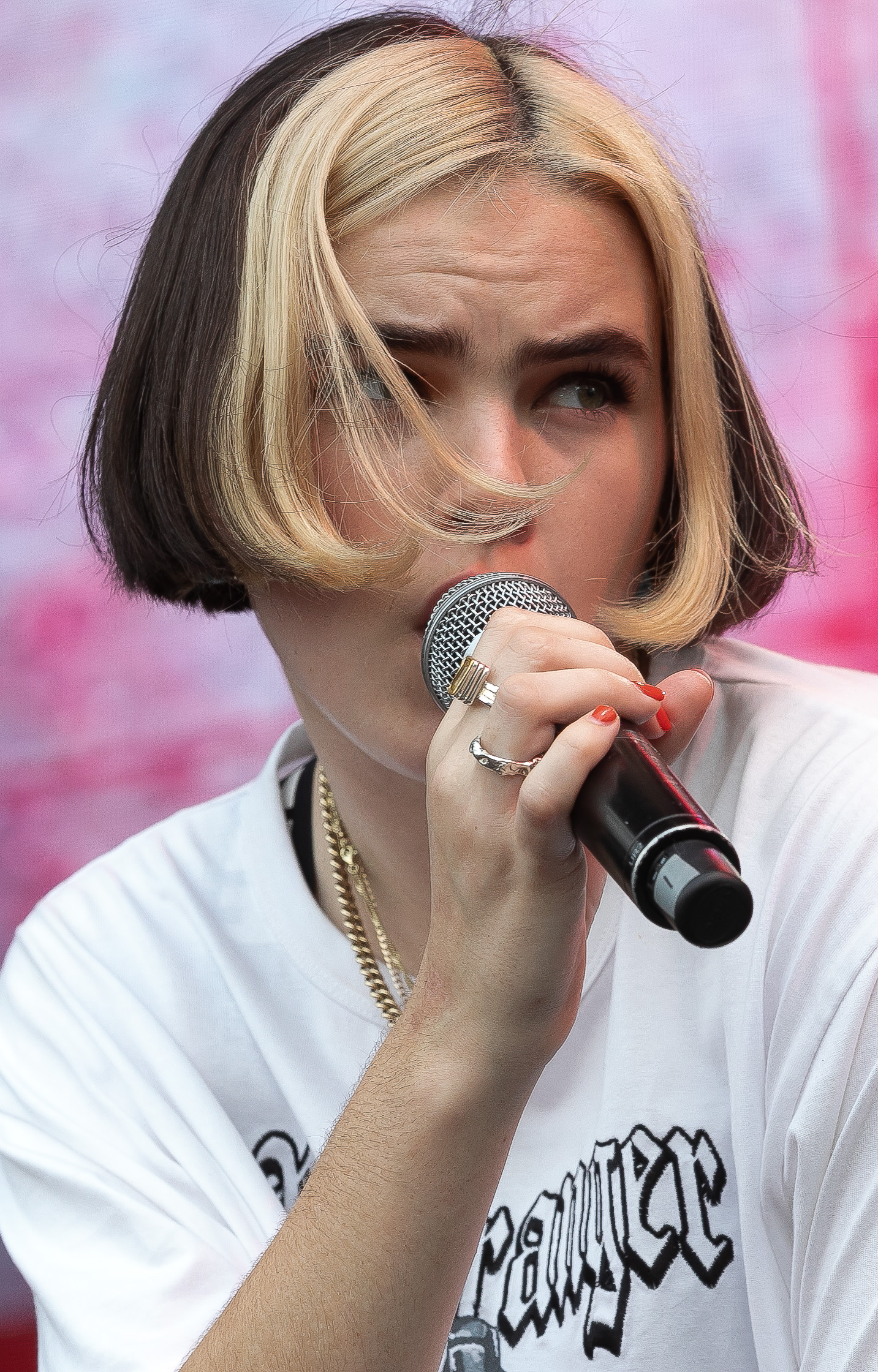
- Benee has won the award four times.
- Awarded for: Excellence in New Zealand Music
- Presented by: Recorded Music NZ
- First award: 2010
- Currently held by: Cassie Henderson – The Yellow Chapter

Highlights
- Most wins: Benee (4)
- Most nominations: Benee (4)

Best Pop Artist (Māori: Te Manu Taki Arotini o te Tau) is an Aotearoa Music Award that honours New Zealand artists for outstanding pop recordings.

The inaugural award was presented as Best Pop Album in 2010 to Gin Wigmore for her album Holy Smoke. In 2017, the award was changed to Best Pop Artist. The change was made to all the genre-specific awards, and was to reflect the changing release climate in which full albums had become less common. Under the new rules, an artist who has released "an album OR a minimum of five tracks" can be nominated.

Benee has the most awards with four wins, followed by Lorde, Kimbra, and Broods who have all won it twice each.

== Recipients ==
=== Best Pop Album (2010 - 2016) ===
Year	Winner	Album	Other finalists	Ref.
2010	Gin Wigmore	Holy Smoke	Anika Moa – Love in Motion; Dane Rumble – The Experiment	
2011	Brooke Fraser	Flags	Kids of 88 – Sugarpills; Julia Deans – Modern Fables	
2012	Kimbra	Vows	Bic Runga – Belle; Gin Wigmore – Gravel & Wine	
2013	Jamie McDell	Six Strings & A Saliboat	AnikaBoh&Hollie (Note: Collaboration between Anika Moa, Boh Runga, and Hollie Smith.) – Peace of Mind; Kids of 88 – Modern Love	
2014	Lorde	Pure Heroine	Benny Tipene – Toulouse; Stan Walker – Inventing Myself	
2015	Broods	Evergreen	Benny Tipene – Bricks; Six60 – Six60	
2016	Broods	Conscious	Avalanche City – We Are for the Wild Places; MAALA – Composure	

=== Best Pop Artist (2017 - present) ===
Year	Winner	Other finalists	Ref.
2017	Lorde – Melodrama	Theia – Theia; Mitch James	
2018	Kimbra	Drax Project; Six60	
2019	Benee – Fire on Marzz	Broods – Don't Feed the Pop Monster; Mitch James – Mitch James	
2020	Benee – Stella & Steve	Paige – Always Growing; Six60 – Six60	
2021	Benee	Foley; LA Women	
2022	Benee – Lychee	Georgia Lines – Human; Lorde – Solar Power	
2023	No awards held		
2024	Georgia Lines	Foley; Paige	
2025	Cassie Henderson – The Yellow Chapter	Frankie Venter; Georgia Lines – The Rose of Jericho	
2026	Lorde – Virgin	Benee – Ur an Angel I'm Just Particles; Borderline – Chrysalis	
