= Vera Ellen =

New Zealand musician

Vera Ellen Williams (born 1995 or 1996), known as Vera Ellen, is a New Zealand musician and winner of both the Taite Music Prize and an Aotearoa Music Award.

== Early life ==
Ellen grew up in Naenae, Lower Hutt, the youngest of four siblings with Polish and Welsh ancestors. She played in bands with her siblings and cousins, then while at high school joined friends in punk band Gaol Bait.

== Career ==
Ellen's first solo album, Monte Cassino, was released online in 2015. Beat Yr Name, also self-released, followed in 2018.

=== Early bands and emergence as a solo artist ===
From 2016 to 2020 she was a member of Maple Syrup, Sweater, and, while she was in the USA studying on exchange to UCLA, Girl Friday. In 2019 she supported New Zealand band The Beths on an American tour, during which her postural orthostatic tachycardia syndrome affected her balance.

The COVID-19 pandemic brought her back to New Zealand in 2020 and led her to return to solo recording. That year she released two EPs, World Emotion and Songs No-one Should Hear, and signed to Flying Nun Records. She also began recording songs for her next album, It's Your Birthday.

She made a short return to the US in 2021, during which she was short of money and affected by depression. While she was there, Girl Friday recorded new material and toured the west coast. In the same year Ellen was hospitalised after a seizure.

Her third solo album, It's Your Birthday, recorded in 2020 and released in 2021, won Best Alternative Artist award at the 2022 Aotearoa Music Awards. It was also shortlisted for the Taite Music Prize. Single 'YOU!' reached #2 on the NZ Official Alt Charts.

At the 2023 APRA Silver Scrolls Vera Ellen and the Exploding Rainbow Orchestra performed 'Andy', the Front Lawn song, as a tribute to new New Zealand Music Hall of Fame inductee Don McGlashan.

=== Ideal Home Noise ===
According to Ellen, Ideal Home Noise was written as a personal account of her experiences with physical and mental health challenges including themes of suicidal ideation, as reflected in the song "Broadway Junction", alongside what she described as "this part of you that really wants to push through, and really wants to see the best in everything and everyone, and in yourself.”

The album, which was produced by Ben Lemi and features her brother Albert River, was released on 31 March 2023 and went on to win the 2024 Taite Music Prize.

On the basis of being shortlisted to play South by Southwest 2024, Ellen arranged a small US tour to begin in March. Days before departure her place at SXSW – "one of those career dreams of mine" – was confirmed. She played in New York and then, on the day of her flight to Austin, joined the artists boycotting the festival in protest against its links with the US defence industry. She still played non-SXSW shows in Austin, including the annual New Zealand Showcase.

At a ceremony in Auckland on 23 April 2024, Ellen was honoured with the Taite Music Prize for Ideal Home Noise. The prize included $12,500 cash from Recorded Music NZ. Accepting the award alongside producer and collaborator Ben Lemi, she compared the moment to a fever dream.

=== heartbreak for jetlag ===
In May 2024 she released her fourth solo EP, heartbreak for jetlag. Self-recorded in her bedroom, she had initially been unsure whether to share the songs beyond friends. The EP earned Ellen a nomination for Best Alternative Artist at the 2025 Aotearoa Music Awards.

== Awards and nominations ==
Year	Association	Category	Nominated work	Result
2022	Aotearoa Music Awards	Best Alternative Artist	It's Your Birthday	Won
2022	Taite Music Prize	Taite Main	It's Your Birthday	Nominated
2024	Taite Music Prize	Taite Main	Ideal Home Noise	Won
2025	Aotearoa Music Awards	Best Alternative Artist	heartbreak for jetlag	Nominated

== Discography ==
=== Solo albums ===
- Monte Cassino, 2015
- Beat Yr Name, 2018
- It’s Your Birthday, 2021
- Ideal Home Noise, 2023

=== Solo EPs ===
- Yuppie Farm, 2017
- World Emotion, 2020
- Songs No-one Should Hear, 2020
- heartbreak for jetlag, 2024

=== With Girl Friday ===
- Tiny Hats (EP, 2017)
- Fashion Conman (EP, 2019)
- Androgynous Mary (album, 2020)
- I’m Impossible/You’re Getting A Dog (EP, 2021)

=== With Sweater ===
- Rock ’n’ Roll Picasso (album, 2017)
- How to Throw an Attacker (EP, 2018)

=== With Maple Syrup ===
- Ace & Gab's Honeymoon (EP, 2016)
- Who is Maple Syrup (album, 2017)
