= Cassie Henderson =

New Zealand singer-songwriter

- Born: 8 November 1998 (age 27); Christchurch, New Zealand
- Genre: Pop
- Website: www.cassiehenderson.com

Cassie Henderson (born 8 November 1998) is a pop singer-songwriter from Christchurch, New Zealand. She first gained attention after reaching the quarter-finals of The X Factor New Zealand as a 14 year old in 2013. After a hiatus to finish her education, she returned to songwriting in 2019, and eventually released her first EP, The Pink Chapter, in 2023, followed by The Yellow Chapter in 2024. In 2023, her song "Whatever" was the most played song on radio by a New Zealand artist for 12 consecutive weeks, and was nominated for the Breakthrough Single of the Year at the 2024 Aotearoa Music Awards. Henderson went on to win Best Pop Artist at the 2025 awards. In 2025, Henderson finished third on the fourteenth season of The Voice Australia.

== Early life and education ==
Henderson was born 8 November 1998, and grew up in Christchurch, New Zealand, where she attended Rangi Ruru Girls' School. Her father, Murray Henderson, is a former rugby union player and coach.

After graduation high school, she went on to study marketing, media, and film at university.

== Career ==
=== 2013: X Factor New Zealand ===
In 2013, at the age of 14, Henderson competed on season one of The X Factor New Zealand. She was mentored by judge Daniel Bedingfield and ultimately placed fifth in the competition. Following her elimination, she returned to her studies.

=== 2019–present ===
Henderson took her elimination from X-Factor hard, and struggled with the expectations required of her to make it in the music industry whilst a teenager. It wasn't until 2019, aged 20, that she returned to songwriting, becoming inspired to write music again after a "really, really bad heartbreak". While back at home during a university break, she wrote her first single, "Tainted", which went on to be released in 2020.

Henderson released her first EP, The Pink Chapter, in 2023, and quit her day job in marketing in order to pursue music full time. In December, she headlined Christmas in the Park.

She released her second EP, The Yellow Chapter, in 2024, which went on to win her Best Pop Artist at the 2025 Aotearoa Music Awards. The EP's lead single, "Seconds to Midnight (11:59)", spent 15 weeks at number on the RadioScope NZ Airplay Charts.

In August 2025, she appeared as a contestant on The Voice Australia; all four of the show's coaches expressed interest in working with her, but Henderson chose to be mentored by Melanie C. She finished third.

She plans to complete her trilogy of EPs, collectively titled The Chronicles of a Heart Broken, with her upcoming release, The Blue Chapter.

== Discography ==
=== EPs ===
- The Pink Chapter (2023)
- The Yellow Chapter (2024)
- Footnotes (2025)

=== Singles ===
Year	Title	Peak chart positions		Album
Year	Title	NZ Hot	NZ Artist Aotearoa	Album
2013	"A Thousand Years (X Factor Performance)"	—	16	n/a
2020	"Tainted"	27	—	n/a
2020	"Burns Brighter"	12	—	n/a
2021	"Complacent"	20	—	n/a
2023	"Whatever"	25	20	The Pink Chapter
2023	"Ghost"	24	—	The Pink Chapter
2024	"Seconds to Midnight (11:59)"	11	—	The Yellow Chapter
2024	"Lemonade"	37	—	The Yellow Chapter
2025	"Good Luck, Babe!"	33	—	Non-album singles
2025	"Teenage Dirtbag"	25	—	Non-album singles
2026	"It's a Wonder"	29	—	Non-album singles

=== Other charted songs ===
Title	Year	Peak chart positions	Album
Title	Year	NZ Hot	Album
"Pity Party"	2025	27	Footnotes
"What Happens Next?"	2025	30	Footnotes
"Bad Teeth"	2025	20	Footnotes

== Awards and nominations ==
Year	Award	Work(s) Nominated	Category	Result	Ref.
2024	Aotearoa Music Awards	"Whatever"	Breakthrough Single	Nominated	
2025	Aotearoa Music Awards	"Seconds to Midnight (11:59)"	Single of the Year	Nominated	
2025	Aotearoa Music Awards	The Yellow Chapter	Best Pop Artist	Won	
