= Foley (band) =

Musical artist from New Zealand

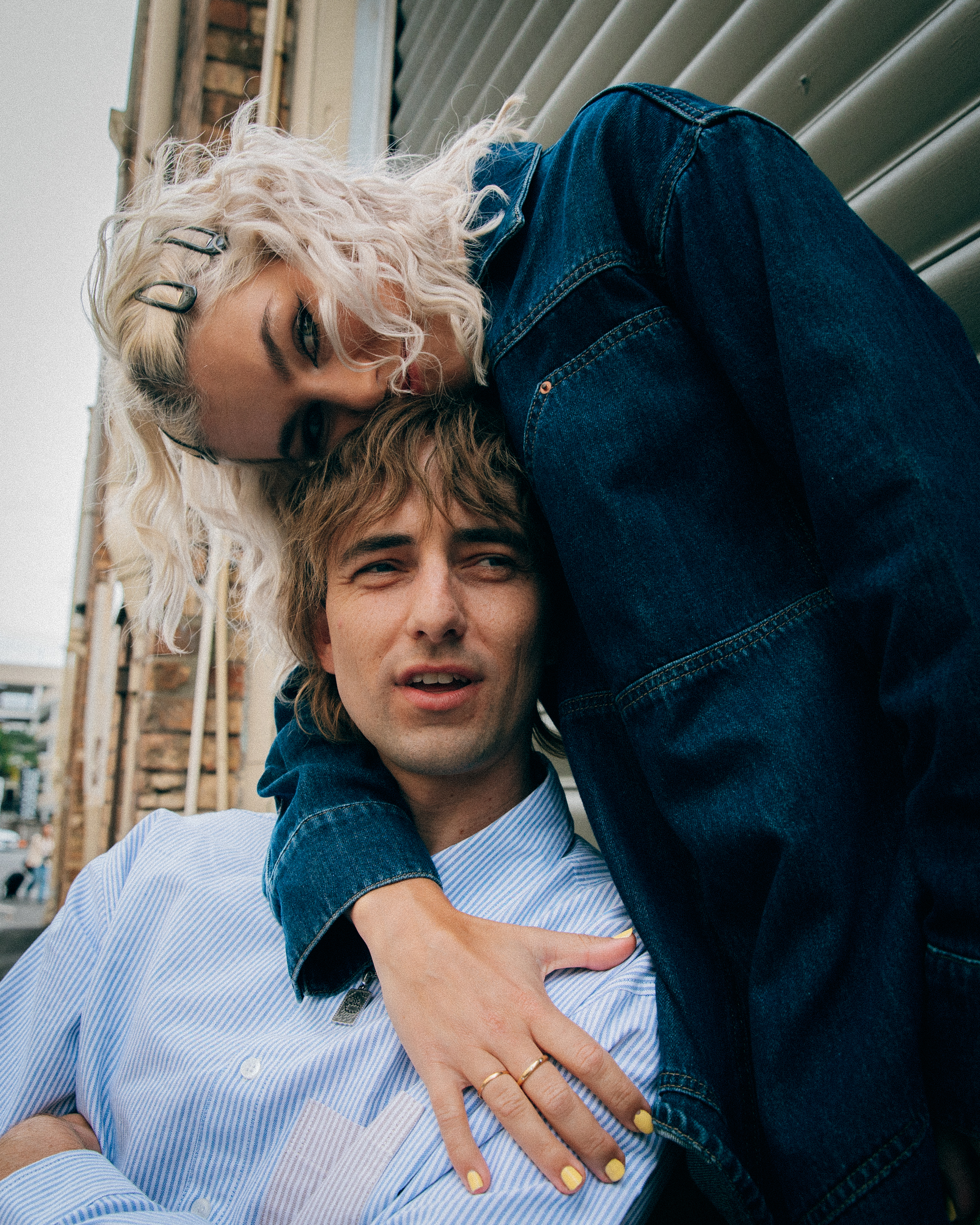
- Foley in 2024

Background information
- Origin: Auckland, New Zealand
- Genres: Pop, indie pop
- Years active: 2017–present
- Members: Ash Wallace, Gabriel Everett
- Website: www.wearefoley.com

Foley are a pop music duo from Auckland, New Zealand. The duo is composed of multi-instrumentalists, songwriters and vocalists Ash Wallace and Gabriel Everett. Foley have been nominated for three Aotearoa Music Awards alongside two APRA Silver Scroll Awards. The band has toured with Remi Wolf, and played shows with Tove Lo, Still Woozy, BENEE, Two Door Cinema Club, Flight Facilities.

In 2022 the band signed to Nettwerk Music Group, releasing their debut album Crowd Pleaser in 2023.

In February 2026, they released the EP Like an Actress.

== Members ==
- Ash Wallace (2017–present)
- Gabriel Everett (2017–present)

Touring members

- Elijah Whyte – drums, percussion (2017–present)
- Marika Hodgson – bass guitar (2019–2021)
- Holly Webster – bass guitar (2021–present)

== Discography ==
=== Studio albums ===
List of albums, with selected details and chart positions
Title	Details	Peak chart positions
Title	Details	NZ Albums
Crowd Pleaser	Released: 25 August 2023; Label: Nettwerk; Formats: Streaming, digital download	2
That's Life, Baby!	Released: 28 February 2025; Label: Foley; Formats: Streaming, digital download	6

=== Extended plays ===
List of extended plays, with selected details and chart positions
Title	Details	Peak chart positions
Title	Details	NZ Albums
On My Conscience	Released: 20 March 2020; Label: Independent; Formats: Streaming, digital download	10
Vacation	Released: 12 March 2021; Label: The Orchard; Formats: Streaming, digital download	19
Like an Actress	Released: 25 February 2026; Label: Foley; Formats: Streaming, digital download	

=== Singles ===
List of singles, with year released and EP shown
Title	Year	Peak chart positions	EP
Title	Year	NZ Hot	EP
"Settle"	2017	—	Non-EP singles
"Talk About It"	2018	—	Non-EP singles
"Stranger"	2018	—	Non-EP singles
"Can't Help the Way"	2019	—	On My Conscience
"Cola"	2019	—	On My Conscience
"Homesick"	2019	—	On My Conscience
"Midnight"	2020	—	On My Conscience
"Rendezvous"	2020	—	Vacation
"So Personal"	2020	—	Vacation
"Better Than Love"	2021	—	Vacation
"Anything Before You"	2021	—	Vacation
"Coffee" (featuring Tim Atlas)	2023	19	Crowd Pleaser, Pt. 1
"What Got into You"	2023	24	Crowd Pleaser
"Miss You All the Time"	2024	—	That's Life, Baby!
"Low & High"	2024	—	That's Life, Baby!
"Time of My Life"	2024	—	That's Life, Baby!
"Unstable"	2024	—	That's Life, Baby!
"Heartstrings"	2024	—	That's Life, Baby!
"Fever"	2025	—	That's Life, Baby!
"Suckerpunch"	2025	—	Like an Actress
"Honey"	2025	—	Like an Actress
"Cinematic"	2026	—	Like an Actress

=== As featured artist ===
List of single appearances as featured artist, with year released and primary artist shown
Title	Year	Primary Artist
"Way Too Long"	2020	Health Club
"Shoe Size"	2020	CASES
"Domino"	2021	Pacific Heights

=== Remixes ===
List of remixes, with year released and remix artist shown
Title	Year	Remix Artist
"Talk About It – Art Heist Remix"	2018	Art Heist
"Talk About It – CASES Remix"	2018	CASES
"Cola – 33 Below Remix"	2020	33 Below
"Smooth It Over – Mel Blue Remix"	2022	Mel Blue
"What Got Into You – Ethan Jupe Remix"	2023	Ethan Jupe
"What Got Into You (Flip)"	2023	HIGH HØØPS

=== Music videos ===
List of music videos, with year released and director shown
Title	Year	Director
"So Personal"	2020	Molawin Evangelista and Platform Studios
"Killing Me Babe"	2022	Katherine Brooke
"Smooth It Over"	2022	Connor Lambert
"Nothing"	2023	Connor Lambert
"Coffee" feat. Tim Atlas	2023	Tom Grut
"Tongue"	2023	Connor Lambert
"What Got Into You"	2023	Tom Grut

== Awards ==
Year	Award	Nomination	Result
2019	APRA Awards	Silver Scroll Award – "Can't Help The Way"	Nominated
2021	Aotearoa Music Awards	Te Kaipuoro Arotini Toa | Best Pop Artist – "Vacation"	Nominated
2021	Aotearoa Music Awards	Breakthrough Artist of the Year – "Vacation"	Nominated
2023	APRA Awards	Silver Scroll Award - "Smooth It Over"	Nominated
2024	Aotearoa Music Awards	Te Manu Taki Arotini o te Tau | Best Pop Artist – "Crowd Pleaser"	Nominated
