= 2008 New Zealand Music Awards =

Annual New Zealand music awards ceremony

- Awarded for: Excellence in New Zealand music
- Sponsored by: Vodafone
- Date: 8 October 2008
- Location: Vector Arena, Auckland
- Country: New Zealand
- Reward: Tui award trophy
- Website: http://www.nzmusicawards.co.nz

Television/radio coverage
- Network: C4

The 2008 Vodafone New Zealand Music Awards took place on 8 October at the Vector Arena in Auckland. Straitjacket Fits were inducted into the New Zealand Music Hall of Fame. The Technical awards took place on 3 September.

== Awards and nominees ==
Winners are listed first and highlighted in boldface.

Multiple winners included Flight of the Concords and Opshop, who each received four awards.

Key
† – Non-technical award
‡ – Technical award

| Album of the Year † | Single of the Year† |
|---|---|
| Sponsored by Nokia: **Flight Of The Conchords - Flight Of The Conchords**; Anika Moa - In Swings The Tide; Liam Finn - I'll Be Lightning; Scribe - Rhymebook; Tiki Taane - Past, Present, Future | Sponsored by Vodafone: **Opshop - One Day**; Liam Finn - Gather To The Chapel; Shihad - One Will Hear The Other; The Phoenix Foundation - Bright Grey; Tiki Taane - Always On My Mind |
| Best Group† | Best Male Solo Artist:† |
| Sponsored by Steinlager Pure: **Flight Of The Conchords - Flight Of The Conchords**; Shihad - Beautiful Machine; The Phoenix Foundation - Happy Ending | **Liam Finn - I'll be Lightning**; SJD - Songs From A Dictaphone; Tiki Taane - Past, Present, Future |
| Best Female Solo Artist:† | Breakthrough Artist of the Year† |
| Sponsored by Mazda: **Anika Moa - In Swings The Tide**; Aaradhna - Sweet Soul Music; Annabel Fay - Annabel Fay | Sponsored by Kiwi FM: **Flight Of The Conchords - Flight Of The Conchords**; Cut Off Your Hands - Blue On Blue; Tiki Taane - Past, Present, Future |
| Best Music Video† | Radio Airplay Record of the Year† |
| Sponsored by C4: **Ian Hart - Her Hairagami Set (The Brunettes)**; Carey Carter - Tangaroa (Tiki Taane); Joe Lonie - Gather To The chapel (Liam Finn) | Sponsored by NZ On Air: **Opshop - Maybe** |
| Highest Selling NZ Single† | Highest Selling NZ Album† |
| **Opshop - "One Day"** | **Opshop - Second Hand Planet** |
| Best Rock Album† | Best Urban/Hip Hop Album† |
| **Shihad - Beautiful Machine**; Liam Finn - I'll Be Lightning; The Phoenix Foundation - Happy Ending | **Scribe - Rhymebook**; Mareko - White Sunday 2:The Book Of Mark; Young Sid - The Truth |
| Best Aotearoa Roots Album† | Best Dance/Electronica Album† |
| **Tiki Taane - Past, Present, Future**; Katchafire - Say What You're Thinking; Kora - Kora | **Recloose - Perfect Timing**; Mareko - White Sunday 2:The Book Of Mark; Young Sid - The Truth |
| Best Maori Album† | Best Gospel/Christian Album† |
| **Ruia - 12:24 Tekau Ma Rua, Rua Tekau Ma Wha**; Moana & the Tribe - Wha; Tiki Taane - Past, Present, Future | **All Left Out - The Conquest**; Parachute Band - Roadmaps and Revelations; The Ember Days - Your Eyes Light Up |
| Best Classical Album† | Best Country Music Album† |
| **Michael Houstoun - Inland**; NZTrio - Bright Tide Moving Between; Gillian Whitehead - Puhake ki te rangi | Presented at the Gold Guitar Awards, 30 May 2008: **Melissa Partridge - Melissa**; Jackie Bristow - Crazy Love; The Cattlestops - Back To Rosetta Road |
| Best Pacific Music Album† | Best Folk Album† |
| Presented at the Pacific Music Awards, 31 May 2008: **Te Vaka - Olatia**; Three Houses Down - Dreadtown; Cydel - Soul Finder | Presented at the Auckland Folk Festival, 25 – 28 January 2008: **Phil Garland – Southern Odyssey**; Owen Hugh - You & I; The Hobnail Boots - The Fortune Horses |
| Best Producer‡ | Best Engineer‡ |
| Presented at the Technical Awards on 3 September: **Lee Prebble – Happy Ending (The Phoenix Foundation)**; Tiki Taane - Past, Present, Future (Tiki Taane); Anika Moa - In Swings The Tide (Anika Moa) | Presented at the Technical Awards on 3 September: **Lee Prebble – Happy Ending (The Phoenix Foundation)**; Tiki Taane & Evan Short - Past, Present, Future (Tiki Taane); Andre Upston - In Swings The Tide (Anika Moa) |
| Best Album Cover‡ | International Achievement Award† |
| Presented at the Technical Awards on 3 September: **Barny Bewick – Keep Me On Your Side (Goodnight Nurse)**; Liam Finn - I'll Be Lightning (Liam Finn); Tim Gummer - Inland (Michael Houstoun) | **Flight Of The Conchords**; **Savage** |
| The Vodafone People's Choice Award† | Legacy Award† |
| **Parachute Band**; Horsemen Family; Nesian Mystik; The Dfenders | **Straitjacket Fits** |

== Performances ==
Performances on the night included the following:

- Cut off your Hands
- Anika Moa
- Tiki Taane
- Scribe
- Julia Deans, Anika Moa, Lani Purkis and Greta Anderson performed a version of Legacy Award winner Straitjacket Fits' "Fast Women".
