= There's a Tuesday =

Indie-pop band from New Zealand

- Origin: Christchurch, New Zealand
- Genres: Indie-pop; folk pop; dream pop
- Members: Nat Hutton (vocals, guitar); Minnie Robberds (vocals, guitar); Joel Becker (bass); Gus Murray (drums)
- Website: theresatuesday.com

There's a Tuesday are an indie-pop band from Christchurch, New Zealand. The band is fronted by Nat Hutton and Minnie Robberds (both on guitar and vocals), along with Joel Becker (bass) and Gus Murray (drums).

The band released their debut EP Dance With Me Before We Cry in 2020, before signing with Benee's label Olive Records in 2021. They released their debut full-length album, Blush, in 2025.

The band has received critical acclaim, including two Silver Scroll nominations, and an Aotearoa Music Award nomination for Breakthrough Artist of the Year.

== Discography ==
=== Studio albums ===
- Blush (2025)

=== Extended plays ===
- Dance with Me Before We Cry (2020)
- Boy Scout (2022)

== Awards and nominations ==
| Year | Award | Work(s) Nominated | Category | Result | Ref. |
|---|---|---|---|---|---|
| 2022 | APRA Music Awards | "Girl at Night" | Silver Scroll Award | Finalist | |
| 2022 | Aotearoa Music Awards | Boy Scout | Breakthrough Artist of the Year | Nominated | |
| 2025 | APRA Music Awards | "Margo" | Silver Scroll Award | Finalist | |
