= My Baby (band) =

Dutch-New Zealand band

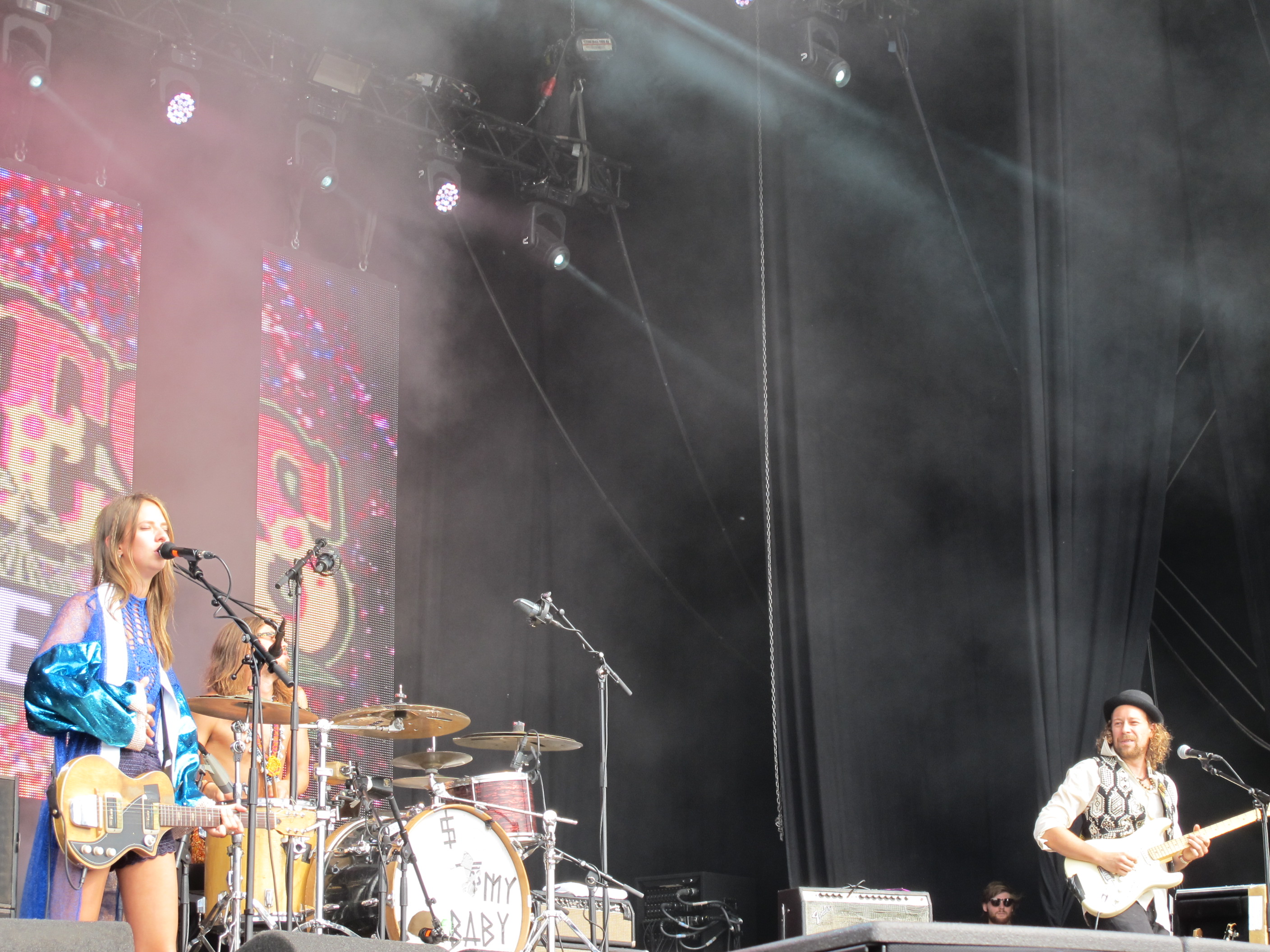
My Baby, 2016

My Baby is a Dutch-New Zealand band from Amsterdam. Their music is a mix of blues, country and funk. My Baby was founded in 2012 by previous members of the Amsterdam soul band The Souldiers. My Baby are Cato van Dijck (lead vocals, bass and violin), her brother Joost van Dijck (drums), and Daniel 'Dafreez' Johnston (guitars).

== Biography ==
The band was discovered in their early years by the PR-Manager of bass player Larry Graham (Sly & the Family Stone, Graham Central Station, Prince). In 2012, he performed together with the band during his Dutch tour, including Paradiso and the North Sea Jazz Club. In 2013, their debut album My Baby Loves Voodoo! got released on jazz label Embrace Recordings.

My Baby's second album Shamanaid came out in 2015. To promote the album, My Baby did fourteen opening shows for the American blues guitarist Seasick Steve during his Sonic Soul Tour in the United Kingdom. In 2015 a re-recording was made for the song "Remedy" from the album Shamanaid and was released as an EP. By the end of 2016 the band spread the word that they were finishing their third album Prehistoric Rhythm. The first single Love Dance came out on February 10, 2017.

My Baby played festivals like Freak Valley, Noorderslag, Zwarte Cross, Lowlands, Down The Rabbit Hole, Paaspop, toured Eastern Europe, South Africa and New Zealand and played Glastonbury 2016 six times.

== Awards ==
Their debut album My Baby Loves Voodoo! was nominated for an Edison in the category audience award. My Baby got nominated twice for an NPO Radio 6 Soul & Jazz Awards in the category "Best Live Act". In March 2016 the band won an Edison in the category "Alternative" for the album Shamanaid.

== Discography ==
- My Baby Loves Voodoo!, 2013
- Shamanaid, 2015
- Remedy II EP, 2015
- Prehistoric Rhythm, 2017
- Mounaiki ~ By the Bright of Night, 2018
- Live!, 2019
- Sake sake sake, 2022
- Echo, 2025
