= Knightshade =

New Zealand rock group

- Origin: New Zealand
- Genres: Rock
- Years active: 1982–
- Members: Wayne Elliott (vocals); Rik Bernards (guitar); Scott Williams (drums); Craig Pollock (guitar); Neil McDonald (bass); Kingsley Smith (keys)
- Past members: Jon Bell (bass); Gavin Lind (guitar); Paul Martin (guitar); Simon Garlick (guitar); Laurie Goosens (guitar); Kevin Taylor (bass); Alan Grady (drums)

Knightshade is a New Zealand rock/hardrock group. They formed in Te Puke in 1982. The band based themselves in Hamilton in the mid-1980s when the lineup changed. The lineup then consisted of Wayne Elliott (vocals), Alan Grady (drums), Rik Bernards (guitar), Jon Bell (bass), Paul Martin (guitar). Paul Martin left the band and Gavin Lind rejoined. This was the lineup that performed and recorded the majority of their work. Craig Pollock replaced Gavin Lind on guitar in 1991. They have had several top 20 singles and have supported major touring acts including Deep Purple, ZZ Top, Bon Jovi, Jimmy Barnes, The Angels, Iggy Pop and Guns N' Roses. They have also released several EPs, a live album and a ‘best of’ studio album in 1995. Knightshade are still based in Hamilton.

The band went their separate ways in 1997, but after a 14-year hiatus they reunited in 2010 and released a new single, 'Rough at the Top', a year later. On 6 June 2014 the band finally returned to the public stage and gave a long-anticipated gig in Hamilton at the Altitude, with several further gigs the same year. 2015 saw the band with their latest line-up, including; Scott Williams on drums, Neil McDonald on bass, and Kingsley Smith on Keyboards. Wayne, Rik, and Craig remained the core original members of the band. Knightshade were invited to perform as part of the bill for the Gemini party, hosted by Paul Martin, on 31 May 2015. The headlining act was Devilskin with Medusa Glare also appearing on the same bill. The rest of 2015 saw the band working on new material and honing the new line-up. On 6 November 2015 they performed at the Mount, at the newly opened 'Totara Street' venue. This was their first gig in the Bay area in almost 20 years. It was a kind of 'coming home' gig for Wayne and Rik, who originally came from the Bay of Plenty area. (Wayne from Te Puke and Rik from Whakatane).

Recording sessions started for the new material towards the end of 2015 and into 2016, but were stalled after Wayne returned for more chemo treatment. After 3 or 4 months of this, Wayne's health temporarily returned and the band decided to announce one final gig, scheduled for 6 August 2016. The band rehearsed for nearly 3 months, with Gael Ludlow joining them to add her vocals for the song Out for the Count. By the time of the gig, the Altitude venue in Hamilton had sold out, with people coming from all over New Zealand for their last chance to experience the band live. A camera crew filmed the concert and have been slowly editing the footage for a full-length Live DVD. At the same time, the band were working on their new single, U Say, which was released on 29 September 2017. This was the first of 4 new songs to be released by Knightshade from the final line-up.

Wayne Elliott died on 4 December 2018, one week after his 67th birthday. The NZ music scene was stunned by the news of this and thousands of fans, friends, family, and bandmates (past & present) gave personal tributes and acknowledgements. Wayne's funeral was held on 10 December at Newstead Cemetery, just outside of Hamilton City.

3 more singles are due for release, posthumously, with the next single due early 2019. The concert footage from the 2016 final gig is also still due for full DVD release, but no time frame has been given yet.

== Discography ==
=== Knightshade on Compilation Albums ===
- 3 Points of Metal album, 1984
- Attack From Downunda album, 1986
- Vicious Vinyl album, 1987
- Bark Number One album, 1995
- Old Skool of Rock: Vol 2 album, 2008
- Simply The Best: 80s Rock Ballads album, 2008
- No Peace For The Wicked album, 2011

=== Albums ===
- Out For the Night album, 1987 (vinyl only)
- Knightshade best-of album, 1995 (CD only)

=== EPs ===
- Out For The Count 4 track EP, 1986 (vinyl only)
- The Physical You 4 track EP, 1987 (vinyl only)

=== Singles ===
Date of Release	Title	Label'	Charted	Weeks in Chart	Certification	Catalog Number
1986	'Out For The Count'	Reaction Records	26 (NZ)	5	-	X19022
1987	'The Physical You'	Reaction Records	14 (NZ)	7	-	X19024
1988	'You Don't Need Me'	Mushroom Records	14 (NZ)	11	-	K588
1989	'Last Night In The City'	Mushroom Records	9 (NZ)	6	-	X13419
1995	'Television Eyes'	Hark Records	-	-	-	HKS31
2011	'Rough At The Top'	-	-	-	-	001
2017	'U Say'	Imperial Music	-			

== Videos ==
- Knightshade reunites - You Don't Need Me - LIVE 6 June 2014
- Knightshade reunites - The Physical You - LIVE 6 June 2014
- The Physical You - (OFFICIAL) LIVE at the Altitude, Hamilton, 6 June 2014

== Performances ==
- 6 June 2014, KNIGHTSHADE with 8FORTY8, Venue: Altitude, Hamilton.
- 21 November 2014, KNIGHTSHADE with 8 steps to Madness, Spex & Gary; at the Mayfair, New Plymouth.
- 5 December 2014, KNIGHTSHADE with 8 steps to Madness, Spex & Gary; at the Altitude, Hamilton.
- 31 May 2015, KNIGHTSHADE with Devilskin, Medusa Glare, Pet & Ali; at the Altitude, Hamilton.
- 6 November 2015, KNIGHTSHADE with Sabbatage, at Totara Street, the Mount.
- 6 August 2016, KNIGHTSHADE with Unholy Rollerz, at the Altitude, Hamilton.
