= Chaii =

Persian-New Zealand rapper, songwriter and producer

Chaii چای
- Born: Mona Sanei; 1991 or 1992 (age 33–34); Ahvaz, Iran
- Occupations: Rapper, songwriter, record producer, audio engineer
- Years active: 2019–present
- Labels: BMG Rights Management, Particle Recordings
- Publisher: BigPop Music Publishing
- Spouse: Frank Keys
- Website: chaiimusic.com

Mona Sanei (born 1991 or 1992), better known as Chaii (stylised in all caps; also چای) is a Persian-New Zealand rapper, songwriter and producer. Chaii's music is distinct for its fusion of Persian and Western musical influences. She has released two EPs and one album: Lightswitch EP (2020), Pineapple Pizza (2021), and Safar (2024).

Chaii's childhood was split between Iran and New Zealand; she moved with her family to Christchurch at the age of eight. This aspect of her identity has influenced much of her work. She became interested in sound engineering at high school, and later studied the craft at SAE Institute Auckland before becoming an audio engineer by trade. She made her debut as Chaii in 2019 with the single "Digebasse (Enough)", which was nominated for the 2019 APRA Silver Scroll.

Several of Chaii's songs have appeared in film, television, games and other media, including the soundtrack for Tony Hawk's Pro Skater 1 + 2 and the FIFA 21 Volta soundtrack. Chaii's first full-length album, Safar (2024), received several nominations including for Album of the Year, Best Single, Best Electronic Artist, among others.

In May 2025, Chaii began a Europe tour, and stated she was working on new material and collaborations.

== Early life ==
Mona Sanei was born in 1991 or 1992 in Ahvaz, Iran. She spent a lot of time outdoors in her early childhood, playing soccer in the streets, bike riding, and swimming. In 2000, at the age of eight years old, she immigrated with her family to New Zealand, initially living in Christchurch.

As a child, Chaii listened to Eminem and Twista as she developed her proficiency in English. She began losing her ability to speak Persian, and made an effort to connect with her language and the culture of her birthplace through film and media, including music by Iranian artists such as Googoosh and Siavash Ghomayshi. Chaii's childhood and influences from both countries resulted in her combined Persian and Kiwi identity, a major aspect of her artistry and musical style.

In her teens, Chaii lived in Auckland and attended Epsom Girls' Grammar, where she became interested in sound engineering. Around the age of 15, she began developing her Persian-influenced musical style. She went on to study spatial design at Auckland University of Technology, but was drawn to the recording studio. After graduating, she enrolled in SAE Institute Auckland to study audio engineering. In her early career, she taught as a supervisor at an audio school, and then worked as an audio engineer.

== Artistry and style ==
Chaii performs rap lyrics in her songs. Her musical style draws from electronica, hip hop, R&B and elements of modern pop music. Chaii's music is also noted for combining Persian influences with Western song-making conventions, such as the rhythmic style of Bandari, the use of a 6/8 time signature, and drum sounds from instruments like the tombak and daf. Some of Chaii's songs have lyrical passages performed in the Persian language. In some cases entire tracks are performed in Persian, such as "Mano Tou" from the EP Pineapple Pizza (2021).

Prior to her career as a performer, Chaii worked as a trained sound engineer, and leverages these skills in the production of her own music. She stated she enjoys working in Logic Pro and favours the Neumann U 87 microphone. In an interview about how she creates songs, Chaii has said she typically starts with the instrumental, beginning with creating a beat. From there, she freestyles and the song takes shape. Likewise, when working with other musicians, she will focus on the beat, using it as an anchor to build the lyrics and song.

== Career ==
=== 2019–2022: Lightswitch and Pineapple Pizza EPs ===
Sanei had released remixes of songs via SoundCloud as early as 2015, but debuted as Chaii in March 2019 with the track "Digebasse (Enough)". It was released with a music video filmed in Oman, which she also produced and directed. Producer Sylvia Massy worked on the final mix for the track The song earned her a nomination in the 2019 APRA Silver Scroll Awards. In October, Chaii followed with "South", a tribute to her birthplace of Ahvaz, which was included in the soundtrack for Tony Hawk's Pro Skater 1 + 2.

In March 2020, Chaii re-released "Digebasse" featuring B Wise. A month later, she released another single, "Trouble", and made a cameo appearance in the music video for "Too Late" by Crap Date. Chaii was slated to make her debut performance at SXSW 2020, but the festival was cancelled due to the COVID-19 pandemic, along with her other international appearances. In June, Spotify announced it was including Chaii in their global artist program, RADAR, becoming the first Kiwi artist to be selected. During this time, she also signed to the Australian branch of BMG.

Chaii released her first EP, Lightswitch, on 10 July 2020. The release featured six tracks and was described as a "visual EP", accompanied with music videos for "Lightswitch", "Middle Ground" and "Nobody Know" with footage from Oman to California. The track "Lightswitch" was used in "No Normal", the series finale of Ms. Marvel, and in episode 8 of the 2022 miniseries Inventing Anna. A modified version was also used in an ad campaign by Mercury Energy in 2024, and the song was included in the FIFA 21 Volta soundtrack. "Nobody Know" appeared in the soundtrack of the Netflix film The Old Guard (2020).

In October 2020, Chaii released the single "Wow (Look At Me)", co-written by Kings and Lawrence Arabia. The track was used in an Apple iPhone 12 commercial and a Fendi fashion campaign, and appeared in episode 8 of Inventing Anna and episode 3 of Wellmania. Later that year, Chaii was nominated for Breakthrough Artist of the Year and Best Producer in the 2020 Aotearoa Music Awards.

In 2021, Chaii worked on her sophomore EP and performed at Electric Avenue. Three of the tracks were released in the lead-up to the EP with accompanying music videos. The first was "Oh Yeah Nah", produced by Party Favor, which appeared in an advert for KIA and episode 1 of Wellmania. In July, "Might Just" featuring Kings and eleven7four was released, followed by "Get It Done" in September. The full EP, Pineapple Pizza, was released on 5 November, and included the track "Mano Tou", a collaboration with Iranian rapper Chvrsi, performed entirely in Persian. Additional writing credits included Mazbou Q and Lawrence Arabia. Prior to the release, the lead single premiered in Fortnite and could be heard on the fictional 'Beat Box' radio station. In late 2021, Chaii left Auckland and moved to Los Angeles.

In 2022, Chaii performed at SXSW 2022.

=== 2023–present: Safar (سفر) ===
In July 2023, Chaii released the single "Drippin' In Gold" with a music video filmed in the suburb of Westwood in Los Angeles, an area known for its Iranian community. The song was co-written by Tom Scott. In August, Chaii performed at the FIFA Women's World Cup 2023 Fan Zone in Auckland. In September, Chaii released the single "Main Thing" featuring saxophone by JY Jong-Yun Lee, and performed a show at The Mothership in Auckland a month later.

In 2024, Chaii released the singles "Fun" and "Night Like This" in March and May, respectively, the former released through BMG in partnership with indie label Particle Recordings. The music video for the latter earned Chaii a nomination for Best Music Video Content at the 2025 Aotearoa Music Awards. These would be the last tracks in anticipation of Chaii's first full album. However, on 5 July 2024, Chaii collaborated with Tones And I and Young Franco on the track "(Can't Get you) Off My Mind". It was the first track released by Coke Studio ANZ. That same month, Chaii performed at the Artists For Palestine Fundraiser in Auckland.

On 16 August 2024, Chaii released Safar, her first full-length studio album. It had been developed over a period of three years. The album name is inspired by the Persian word سفر, meaning 'journey'. In the lead up, she performed at SXSW Austin, Colossus Festival NYC, Mercury Lounge NYC, and School Night LA, marking her first US tour. In addition, she performed on MBC Persia TV London, and had performances in Sydney and Melbourne. At the 2025 Aotearoa Music Awards, Chaii and Stan Walker were tied with the most nominations; she was nominated Best Electronic Artist, while the album was nominated for Album of the Year, and "We Be Killing It" was nominated for Single of the Year. Simon Gooding and Frank Keys were nominated for Best Engineer and Best Producer, respectively, for their work on the album. Rolling Stone Australia ranked Safar at 11 in their list of top 50 New Zealand albums in 2024.

In 2025, Chaii performed at WOMAD Aotearoa. She began a Europe tour in May, but stated she intended to spend more time in Sydney, and expected to release more collaborations with other artists in the near future.

== Personal life ==
Chaii moved from Auckland to Los Angeles in 2021. She is married to musician Frank "Keys" Eliesa of the band Yoko-Zuna, who has been a creative collaborator on much of her work. Her father is a doctor, and she has an older sister.

Chaii can play flamenco guitar, enjoys fishing, and played football growing up. She has described having a "visual arts background" and has an interest in oil painting.

== Discography ==
=== Albums ===
- Safar (2024)

=== Singles & EPs ===
- "Digebasse (Enough)" (2019)
- "South" (2019)
- "Digebasse feat. B Wise" (2020)
- "Trouble" (2020)
- Lightswitch EP (2020)
- "WOW (Look At Me)" (2020)
- "Oh Nah Yeah" (2021)
- "Might Just feat. Kings & eleven7Four" (2021)
- "Get It Done" (2021)
- Pineapple Pizza (2021)
- "Drippin' In Gold" (2023)
- "Main Thing" (2023)
- "Fun" (2024)
- "Night Like This" (2024)

=== As featured artist ===
- "(Can’t Get You) Off My Mind" (2024) with Tones And I, Young Franco
