= Harper Finn =

New Zealand singer-songwriter

- Born: Sydney, New South Wales, Australia
- Occupation: Singer-songwriter
- Years active: 2018–present
- Parents: Tim Finn (father); Marie Azcona (mother)
- Relatives: Neil Finn (uncle), Liam Finn (cousin)
- Musical career
- Genre: Pop music
- Instrument: Vocals, piano
- Label: Warner Music New Zealand
- Website: https://www.harperfinnmusic.com

Harper Finn is a New Zealand singer and musician. His album 'Silo Park' is set to release on 31 October 2025. Following the release of his single "Dance Away These Days", Finn was awarded Breakthrough Artist of the Year at the Aotearoa Music Awards in 2021.

== Early life ==
Harper Finn was born in Sydney, Australia, to New Zealand musician Tim Finn (of Split Enz and Crowded House) and television presenter Marie Azcona.

The family moved back to Auckland, New Zealand when he was age 1. As a teenager he worked at an Auckland music venue. He featured in many of Tim Finn's music videos and sang backing vocals on a song from the album The View Is Worth the Climb. He spent some of his teenage years performing alongside his father in several of his events in New Zealand and Australia.

== Career ==
In 2018 Harper Finn released his first single "Look Who's Sorry Now".

Finn released 'Dance Away These Days' October 2nd 2020, the song was co-produced by five-time Grammy winner Cole MGN (Beck, Snoop Dogg, Blood Orange) and Tobias Kuhn (Dean Lewis, Milky Chance). The 'Dance Away These Days' official music video was co-directed by James K Lowe and Nicole Miller-Wong. Following this release Finn was nominated and then awarded '‘Breakthrough Artist of the Year' at The Aotearoa Music Awards in 2021 and has been described as having "unique sound, signature moves and the ability to hypnotise a crowd"

Different Skies is the latest track from NEWCOMER, Harper’s 8-track EP that is set to be released later this year. NEWCOMER tells the stories of the places Harper’s stayed over the last couple of years and particularly his move to New York City.

== Discography ==
=== Extended plays ===
List of albums, with selected details
Title	EP details
Newcomer	Released: 29 July 2022; Label: Warner Music; Format: CD, DD, streaming

=== Charted or certified singles ===
Title	Year	Peak chart positions	Certification	Album
Title	Year	NZ Hot	Certification	Album
"Dance Away These Days"	2020	—	RMNZ: Gold	Newcomer
"Satellite"	2025	21		Silo Park

== Awards ==
=== Aotearoa Music Awards ===
The Aotearoa Music Awards honour outstanding artistic and technical achievements in the recording field.

Year	Nominee / work	Award	Result
2021	Harper Finn - "Dance Away These Days"	Breakthrough Artist of the Year Award	Won
