= Georgia Lines =

New Zealand singer-songwriter (born 1996)

- Born: October 8, 1996 (age 30); Mount Maunganui, New Zealand
- Genre: Pop
- Label: Independent
- Website: www.georgialinesmusic.com

Georgia Lines (born 8 October 1996) is a New Zealand singer-songwriter. She gained recognition with her self-titled debut extended play and her debut album The Rose of Jericho (2024). In 2023, she was most played New Zealand-female artist on radio. She has since received multiple awards and nominations, winning three Aotearoa Music Awards.

== Early life ==
Lines was born 8 October 1996 in Mount Maunganui, New Zealand. She started performing from a young age, busking outside the local bank with her younger brother, MacKenzie, at the age of 7. MacKenzie has continued to support Lines, and performs as the drummer for her band.

She was the winner of Smokefree Rockquest in 2014, and met her future manager at the contest.

== Career ==
Lines released her debut single "Vacant Cities" in 2019, and followed it up with her self-titled debut EP Georgia Lines in 2020. A crowdfunding campaign on Kickstarter allowed Lines to travel to the USA to record the EP in Texas. In 2021, she released a follow-up single, "No One Knows", which gained popularity across streaming platforms and went on to win Best Video at the 2021 Aotearoa Music Awards.

In 2022, she won the Breakthrough Artist of the Year, and was nominated for Best Pop Artist at the Aotearoa Music Awards. She went on to release her breakthrough EP Human, which debuted at number one on the Official Top 20 New Zealand Album Charts. Its lead single "Faith" spent four weeks at number one on the New Zealand Airplay charts.

In 2023, she performed several critically acclaimed shows at SXSW; she signed with Wasserman Music after the agency offered her deal following the festival. She went on to release two stand-alone singles, "Romeo" and "Monopoly", which both achieved #1 status on NZ radio.

Lines released her debut album The Rose of Jericho in June 2024. On release, the album hit number one on the New Zealand Album charts, and number three on the New Zealand Top 40 Album charts. The album had four singles that hit number one, including "The Letter" and Wayside". "The Letter" was also a final nominee for the prestigious 2024 Silver Scroll awards.

In 2025, Lines was featured in Rolling Stone Australia's Future of Music 2025 list, and was nominated for four Aotearoa Music Awards, including Album of the Year, Single of the Year ("The Letter"), Best Solo Artist, and Best Pop Artist. She was also a finalist for the 2025 Taite Music Prize for The Rose of Jericho. In May 2025, she released a single, "Wonderful Life".

In November 2026 she was awarded the Top Female Artist Award from the Variety Artists Club of New Zealand.

== Discography ==
=== Albums ===
- The Rose of Jericho (2024)
- Live at the Civic (live album) (2026)

=== EPs ===
- Georgia Lines (2020)
- Falling (2022)
- Human (2022)
- The Guest House (2025)

=== Singles ===
Title	Year	Peak chart positions	Album
Title	Year	NZ Hot	Album
"Vacant Cities"	2019	— (Note: "Vacant Cities" did not enter the NZ Top 40 Singles Chart, but peaked at number fifteen on the Hot 20 Aotearoa Singles Chart.)	Georgia Lines (EP)
"Never Had Love"	2019	—	Georgia Lines (EP)
"My Love"	2020	— (Note: "My Love" did not enter the NZ Top 40 Singles Chart, but peaked at number eighteen on the Hot 20 Aotearoa Singles Chart.)	Georgia Lines (EP)
"Same Things"	2020	— (Note: "Same Things" did not enter the NZ Top 40 Singles Chart, but peaked at number nine on the Hot 20 Aotearoa Singles Chart.)	Georgia Lines (EP)
"Made for Loving"	2020	37 (Note: "Made for Loving" also peaked at number five on the Hot 20 Aotearoa Singles Chart.)	Georgia Lines (EP)
"No One Knows"	2021	— (Note: "No One Knows" did not enter the NZ Top 40 Singles Chart, but peaked at number fourteen on the Hot 20 Aotearoa Singles Chart.)	Falling (EP)
"I Got You"	2021	27 (Note: "I Got You" also peaked at number two on the Hot 20 Aotearoa Singles Chart.)	Falling (EP)
"Call Me by My Name"	2021	—	Non-album singles
"Tōrere"	2021	— (Note: "Tōrere" did not enter the NZ Top 40 Singles Chart, but peaked at number sixteen on the Hot 20 Aotearoa Singles Chart, and at number 10 on the Top 10 Te Reo Māori Singles Chart.)	Non-album singles
"Hine E Hine"	2022	—	Non-album singles
"Leave Behind"	2022	30 (Note: "Leave Behind" also peaked at number four on the Hot 20 Aotearoa Singles Chart.)	Human (EP)
"Faith"	2022	4 (Note: "Faith" also peaked at number one on the Hot 20 Aotearoa Singles Chart.)	Human (EP)
"Nothing But Love"	2022	39 (Note: "Nothing But Love" also peaked at number five on the Hot 20 Aotearoa Singles Chart.)	Human (EP)
"Monopoly"	2023	17 (Note: "Monopoly" also peaked at number three on the Hot 20 Aotearoa Singles Chart.)	Non-album singles
"Te Aroha Mou"	2023	— (Note: "Te Aroha Mou" did not enter the NZ Top 40 Singles Chart, but peaked at number ten on the Hot 20 Aotearoa Singles Chart.)	Non-album singles
"Romeo"	2023	13 (Note: "Romeo" also peaked at number two on the Hot 20 Aotearoa Singles Chart.)	Non-album singles
"Grow Old Without You"	2024	— (Note: "Grow Old Without You" did not enter the NZ Top 40 Singles Chart, but peaked at number eighteen on the Hot 20 Aotearoa Singles Chart.)	The Rose of Jericho
"The Letter"	2024	— (Note: "The Letter" did not enter the NZ Top 40 Singles Chart, but peaked at number four on the Hot 20 Aotearoa Singles Chart.)	The Rose of Jericho
"Wayside"	2024	36 (Note: "Wayside" also peaked at number one on the Hot 20 Aotearoa Singles Chart.)	The Rose of Jericho
"Say You Still"	2024	— (Note: "Say You Still" did not enter the NZ Top 40 Singles Chart, but peaked at number nineteen on the Hot 20 Aotearoa Singles Chart.)	The Rose of Jericho
"Grand Illusion"	2024	— (Note: "Grand Illusion" did not enter the NZ Top 40 Singles Chart, but peaked at number thirteen on the Hot 20 Aotearoa Singles Chart.)	The Rose of Jericho
"Wonderful Life"	2025	27 (Note: "Wonderful Life" also peaked at number one on the Hot 20 Aotearoa Singles Chart.)	The Guest House
"Julia"	2025	29	The Guest House

== Awards and nominations ==
Year	Award	Work(s) Nominated	Category	Result	Ref.
2021	Aotearoa Music Awards	"No One Knows"	Best Video	Won	
2022	Aotearoa Music Awards	Herself	Breakthrough Artist of the Year	Won	
2022	Aotearoa Music Awards	Herself	Best Pop Artist	Nominated	
2023	Rolling Stone (NZ) Music Awards	Herself	Best New Artist	Nominated	
2024	Aotearoa Music Awards	Herself	Best Pop Artist	Won	
2024	APRA Music Awards	"The Letter"	Silver Scroll Award	Finalist	
2025	Aotearoa Music Awards	The Rose of Jericho	Album of the Year	Nominated	
2025	Aotearoa Music Awards	"The Letter"	Single of the Year	Nominated	
2025	Aotearoa Music Awards	Herself	Best Solo Artist	Nominated	
2025	Aotearoa Music Awards	Herself	Best Pop Artist	Nominated	
2025	Taite Music Prize	The Rose of Jericho	Taite Music Prize	Finalist	
