= DARTZ (New Zealand band) =

New Zealand garage punk band

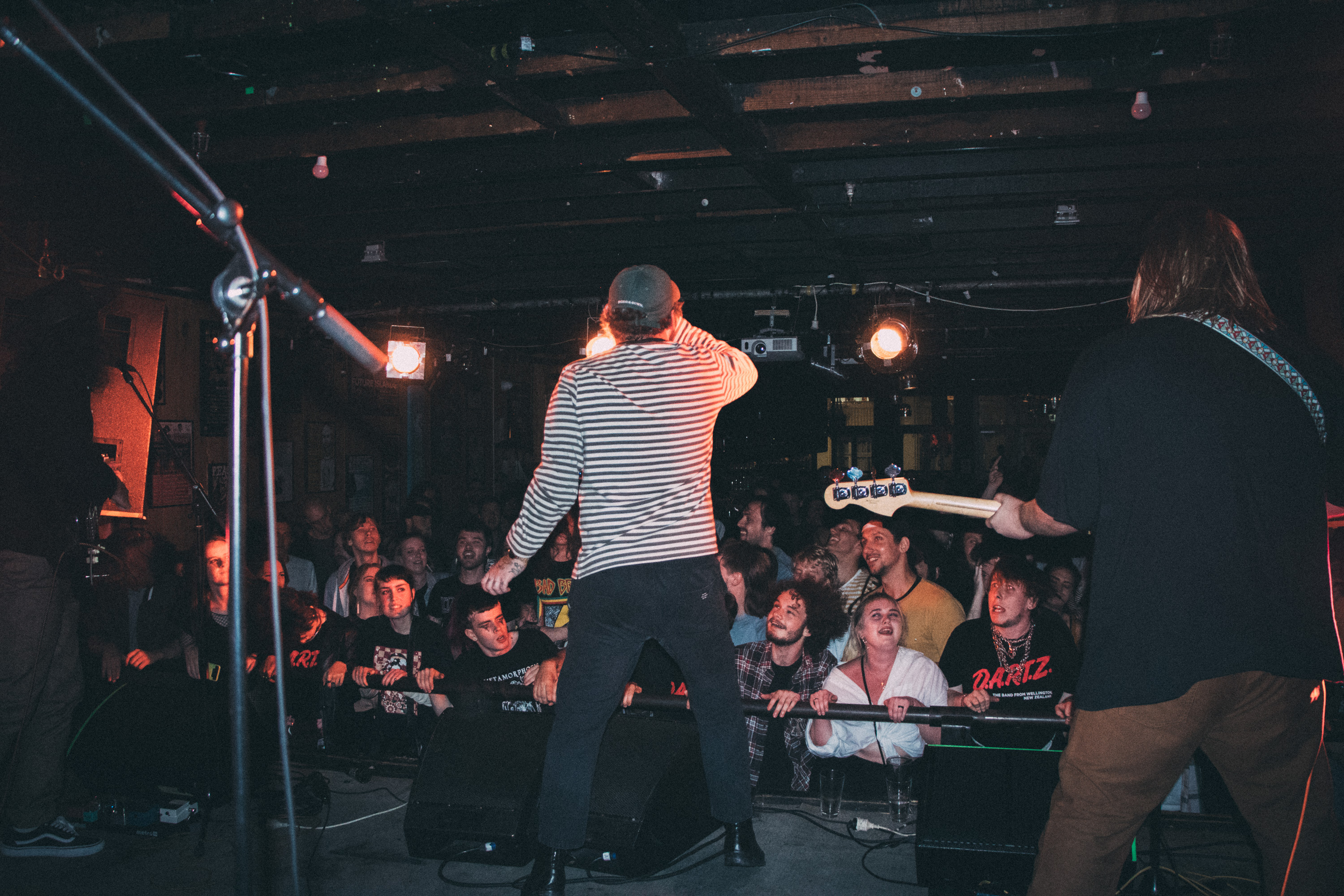
- DARTZ performing in Wellington, 2021

Background information
- Origin: Wellington, New Zealand
- Genres: Punk rock, garage punk
- Years active: 2019–present
- Label: Flying Nun Records
- Members: Daniel Vernon (Danz); Clark Mathews; Hakopa Kuka-Larsen (Rollyz); Christan Pianta (Crispy)
- Website: https://smokedartz.com/

DARTZ (stylised in all caps) is a punk rock band from Wellington, New Zealand, formed in 2019. The band consists of vocalist Daniel Vernon, guitarist Christan Pianta, bassist Clark Mathews, and drummer Hakopa Kuka-Larsen. Their lyrics draw on everyday New Zealand life, culture, and politics.

After signing to Flying Nun Records in 2022, DARTZ released their debut studio album, The Band From Wellington, New Zealand. Their second album, Dangerous Day To Be A Cold One (2024), debuted at number one on the Official Top 40 Albums chart and was a finalist for the 2025 Taite Music Prize. In 2025, DARTZ won Best Rock Artist at the Aotearoa Music Awards.

== History ==
The band was formed in early 2019 when friends Daniel Vernon and Christan Pianta, who had recently moved to Wellington, submitted the fictional band name "DARTZ" as a joke application to open for Australian punk band The Chats. When DARTZ were unexpectedly confirmed as the Wellington support act, Vernon and Pianta recruited Clark Mathews and Hakopa Kuka-Larsen to complete the lineup. With two weeks to prepare, the group quickly wrote a set of original material, and after the show they made the decision to continue performing.

DARTZ released their debut single "40 Riddiford Street" later in 2019, followed by further independently distributed singles and touring around New Zealand. In 2021, the band's song "Bathsalts" was selected for the Top 20 shortlist for the APRA Silver Scroll award.

In 2022, DARTZ signed to Flying Nun Records and released their debut album The Band From Wellington, New Zealand, which included songs written for their initial performance. The album was described as blending punk energy and local storytelling, and was supported by touring across New Zealand and Australia.

The band followed up in 2024 with their second album Dangerous Day To Be A Cold One, which debuted at number one on both the official New Zealand Album Charts and the Official Top 20 Aotearoa Albums chart. The record was praised by Rolling Stone Australia for its "great wit, honest storytelling, and effortless ensemble work," and was a finalist for the 2025 Taite Music Prize, with single "Paradise" named in the Top 20 shortlist for the 2024 APRA Silver Scroll award. In May 2024, DARTZ performed at The Great Escape Festival in Brighton, England, playing three sets across the festival.

In April 2025, DARTZ released the single "Moving To Melbourne" before embarking on a 30-plus date tour of The United Kingdom and Europe, including shows in Italy, Germany, Denmark, Sweden, Belgium and France. In the same year, DARTZ won Best Rock Artist at the Aotearoa Music Awards, while director Oscar Keys, cinematographer Ezra Simons and art director Kristin Li won best music video content for their work on the band's "Paradise" music video.

== Musical style and lyrics ==
DARTZ have been described as a punk rock and garage punk band. Their lyrics frequently draw on everyday life and politics in New Zealand. Rolling Stone Australia highlighted the band's recurring references to renting, drinking, and cars, and described 2023 single "Steal from the Supermarket" as a humorous response to supermarket price gouging. Viva Magazine described the group as "politically aware class clowns", citing lyrics concerning the legacy of Captain Cook, Brian Tamaki, and daily life in Wellington.

== Critical reception ==
DARTZ's debut album The Band From Wellington, New Zealand was included in RNZ Music 101's list of great albums of 2022.

The band's second album, Dangerous Day To Be A Cold One, received a four-star review from Rolling Stone Australia, which praised the band's "great wit, honest storytelling, and effortless ensemble work". The magazine later ranked the album tenth on its list of the 50 best New Zealand albums of 2024, and 43rd on its 2025 list of the 80 best New Zealand albums of the 2020s so far. The New Zealand Herald also included the album among its favourite New Zealand releases of 2024.

== Band members ==
- Daniel Vernon – vocals (2019–present)
- Clark Mathews – bass guitar (2019–present)
- Hakopa Kuka-Larsen – drums (2019–present)
- Christan Pianta – guitars (2019–present)

== Discography ==
DARTZ have released two extended plays and two studio albums.

=== Charting singles ===
Year	Title	Peak chart positions	
Year	Title	Hot 40 Singles	Hot 20 Aotearoa Singles
2020	"High at the Beach"	33	5
2022	"Dominion Road (Dumpling House)"	—	9
2024	"Paradise"	—	9
2024	"Dangerous Day To Be A Cold One"	—	13
2025	"Moving To Melbourne"	—	10

=== Extended plays ===
List of EPs, with selected details
Title	Details
No Matter Whatz	Released: 2 August 2019; Label: Independent; Format: Digital download, streaming
Quit Before It Is Too Late	Released: 20 April 2021; Label: Independent; Format: Digital download, streaming, cassette

=== Albums ===
List of albums, with selected details and peak chart positions
Title	Details	Peak chart positions	
Title	Details	NZ Albums	NZ Aotearoa Albums
The Band From Wellington, New Zealand	Released: 4 November 2022; Label: Flying Nun Records; Format: Digital download, streaming, vinyl LP, CD	4	1
Dangerous Day To Be A Cold One	Released: 1 March 2024; Label: Flying Nun Records; Format: Digital download, streaming, vinyl LP, CD	1	1

== Awards and nominations ==
Year	Award	Category / work	Result
2021	APRA Silver Scroll	"Bathsalts"	Top 20 shortlist
2021	Student Radio Network Awards	Favourite Group	Won
2022	Student Radio Network Awards	Te Tōtahi Toa / Favourite Single – "Hoons"	Finalist
2022	Student Radio Network Awards	Te Rōpū Mariu / Favourite Group	Finalist
2024	APRA Silver Scroll	"Paradise"	Top 20 shortlist
2025	Taite Music Prize	Dangerous Day To Be A Cold One	Finalist
2025	Aotearoa Music Awards	Te Tino Kāhui Manu Taki o te Tau / Best Group – Dangerous Day To Be A Cold One	Finalist
2025	Aotearoa Music Awards	Te Manu Taki Rakapioi o te Tau / Best Rock Artist – Dangerous Day To Be A Cold One	Won
2025	Aotearoa Music Awards	Te Iti Rearea o te Tau / Breakthrough Artist of the Year	Finalist
