= Holidaymakers =

Holidaymakers was a New Zealand musical group from Wellington. The band scored two top ten hits in New Zealand in 1988, including the number-one single "Sweet Lovers", a cover of the Bill Withers song "We Could Be Sweet Lovers".

"Sweet Lovers" was released on Pagan Records and was produced by Nigel Stone. The song spent six weeks at #1 in summer 1988 and was the highest-selling single in New Zealand in 1988. The follow-up single, "Waiting in the Sunshine", reached #6 in December of that year.

At the New Zealand Music Awards 1988, the group won seven awards. However, the group broke up soon after the release of "Waiting in the Sunshine".

Among the band's members was Pati Umaga, who went on to work in composition and music education at Whitireia Polytechnic, and who became an advocate for physical disability after a 2005 accident paralysed him.
