= Dam Native =

New Zealand hip hop group

Dam Native (formerly Native Base)
- Origin: New Zealand
- Genres: hip hop
- Years active: 1992–present
- Past members: Danny Haimona; Bennett Pomana
- Website: http://www.damnative.com/

Dam Native is a New Zealand hip hop group formed in 1992.

== History ==
=== Group Formed 1992 ===
Dam Native is a New Zealand hip hop group that was prominent during the mid- to late-1990s. Its first members consisted of Danny Haimona and Bennett Pomana, now an ex-member. The group formed in 1992 under the name Native Bass and released an album at a time when the industry was virtually devoid of any New Zealand hip hop.

Dam Native focuses on Māori issues and other political issues relating to New Zealand. The group have released two albums, Kaupapa Driven Rhymes Uplifted (sometimes shortened to K.D.R.U.) released in 1997 and Aotearoa... Nobody Does It Better released in 2010.

Dam Native have supported major international acts such as Public Enemy, Ice T, Spearhead, Ben Harper, Red Hot Chili Peppers, Del the Funky Homosapien, Big Day Out Tour New Zealand and Australia, Body Count and The Fugees, became the first "Māori Hip Hop" group to win two NZ music awards.

In 1997, Dam Native won two awards at the NZ Music Awards - the group won Most Promising Group and Daniel Haimona won Most Promising Male Vocalist. "Behold My Cool Style" music video director Jonathan King was nominated for Best Video.

=== Live Band Period 2004-2010 ===
Recently, a live band has been put together, normally referred to as Dam Native Live Band to distinguish from MC sets. The group's cypher (an illegal tag or secret street name) was DAMN8V (source: Tom Atkinson, drummer).

- Lead vocals: Hype the native
- Vocals, guitar: Blackman
- BVs: 612
- Bass guitar: Jo Keating
- Guitar: T.K aka Thomas kani kani
- Keys: Timothy William
- Drums: Tomachi aka Tom Atkinson
- Percussion: Jo Kopua

=== Recently in 2022 ===
Radio New Zealand created season two of documentary series NZ Hip Hop Stand Up; Episode 3 of which focuses on Dam Native.

== Discography ==
Title	Details	Peak chart positions
Title	Details	NZ
Kaupapa Driven Rhymes Uplifted	Released: 1997; Label: Tangata (TANGD528)	5
Aotearoa... Nobody Does It Better	Released: 2010; Label: Heart Music (HMCD001)	—

== Videography ==
Title	Production	Year
*Behold My Cool style	Kaupapa Driven Rhymes Uplifted	n/a
*Lick My Patu bFM live to air at Red Bull	Album Aotearoa... Nobody does it better filmed at Red Bull Studios NZ	n/a
