= Mokotron =

New Zealand electronic musician

Mokotron, real name Tiopira McDowell (Ngāti Hine) and often stylised MOKOTRON, is an electronic musician from New Zealand. His debut album, WAEREA, was named New Zealand's second-best album of 2024 by Rolling Stone and won the 2025 Taite Music Prize.

== Family and early life ==
McDowell grew up in Tāmaki Makaurau (Auckland). His mother was from Northland with whakapapa that connects to Ngātokimatawhaorua te waka, while his father was from Palmerston North and has British and Irish ancestry. His sister is actor, director and playwright Miriama McDowell.

== Music production ==
In 1998 as a high school student McDowell worked with Micronism (producer Denver McCarthy) on an album, The Lonely Robots Club, that was never released. The experience left him feeling unsupported and discouraged from making music as anything more than a side-project.

He started self-releasing music in 2011 but stopped again the next year. In 2020 he made a decision sparked by the death of producer Reuben Winter (Totems), and returned to music-making. His home-recorded music falls into the genre of "Māori bass", mixing drum and bass and dub step beats with taonga pūoro (traditional instruments like wooden flutes) and vocals chanted in te reo Māori.

Mokotron released four EPs in three years: Battlezone in 2020; 2021’s TATAU O TE PŌ and TAWHITO in 2021; and EMBRACE THE BASS in 2022.

In March 2024 he released The United Tribes of Bass, a collection of remixes by eight different Māori and Cook Island Māori artists. His first album, WAEREA, followed that December.

=== Awards ===
- TAWHITO - Te Tohu Hopunga Puoro Mariu (Favourite EP/Mixtape), 2022 Student Radio Network Awards.
- Te Tohu Kaipuoro Toa (Favourite Solo Act), 2024 Mighty Aotearoa Alternative Awards.
- WAEREA (2024) - Taite Music Prize, 2025.

== Academic career ==
Doctor McDowell is a senior lecturer in Māori and Pacific studies, and the head of Te Wānanga o Waipapa, at the University of Auckland. He keeps his music and academic careers deliberately separate, but says that they share "values".
