= 2019 New Zealand Music Awards =

Annual New Zealand music awards ceremony

- Awarded for: Excellence in New Zealand music
- Sponsored by: Vodafone
- Date: 14 November 2019
- Location: Spark Arena
- Country: New Zealand
- Reward: Tui award trophy
- Website: http://www.nzmusicawards.co.nz

Television/radio coverage
- Network: Three

The 2019 New Zealand Music Awards was the 53rd holding of the annual ceremony featuring awards for musical recording artists based in or originating from New Zealand. It took place on 14 November 2019 at Spark Arena in Auckland and was hosted by Laura Daniel and Jon Toogood. The awards show was broadcast live nationally on Three.
