= The Stereo Bus =

New Zealand band

- Origin: Christchurch, New Zealand
- Years active: 1997–2000, 2011–present
- Labels: Festival Records, EMI Records
- Spinoff of: Jean-Paul Sartre Experience
- Members: David Yetton; Francis Hunt; Nick Buckton; Matthias Jordan; Mike Hall; Mike Franklin Browne
- Past members: Jason Fa'afoi; Bobby Kennedy; Mark Beaton

The Stereo Bus are a New Zealand band, formed by David Yetton, formerly of the Jean-Paul Sartre Experience.

The band recorded two albums: The Stereo Bus in 1997 and Brand New in 1999 and were originally active between 1997 and 2000.

In March 2011 founder David Yetton announced a new line-up and indicated he would return to playing live and recording under The Stereo Bus moniker

== Discography ==
=== Studio albums ===
- The Stereo Bus (1997 – Beats Bodega Records – BEATS005 / EMI (NZ) Ltd. – 5226082)
  1. Shallow
  2. Don't Open Your Eyes
  3. Wash Away
  4. Mirror
  5. Be A Girl
  6. Tell
  7. Lie in the Arms
  8. Waste of Time
  9. Bright Lights
  10. Fade
  11. God's Fingers
  12. Far Away
- Brand New (1999 – EMI – 5226092)
  1. Hey Thank You
  2. Touchdown
  3. Pretty Boys And Girls
  4. Birthday
  5. Brand New
  6. Quiet Rose
  7. Caramel
  8. Nova Scotia
  9. Let It Flow
  10. Hold You Close
  11. Burning Alcohol

=== Compilations ===
- Double Decker (2001) (Box set of first two albums)

=== EPs ===
- Be a Girl
- HeyThank You
- Birthday
