= Aotearoa Music Awards =

New Zealand music recording award

- Awarded for: Excellence in New Zealand music
- Country: New Zealand
- Presented by: Recorded Music NZ
- Formerly called: Loxene Golden Disc (1965–1972); Recording Arts Talent Awards (1973–1977); RIANZ Awards (1978–1995); Clear Music and Entertainment Awards (1996–1997); New Zealand Music Awards (1998–2019)
- Reward: Tūī trophy
- Established: 1965; 61 years ago
- Website: aotearoamusicawards.nz

The Aotearoa Music Awards (formerly the New Zealand Music Awards, and colloquially known as The Tūīs), conferred annually by Recorded Music NZ, honour outstanding artistic and technical achievements in the recording industry. The awards are among the most significant that a group or artist can receive in New Zealand music, and have been presented annually since 1965. The awards show is presented by Recorded Music NZ. A range of award sponsors and media partners support the event each year.

== History and overview ==
The first awards for New Zealand recorded music were the Loxene Golden Disc awards, launched in 1965. The awards were created by soap powder manufacturer Reckitt & Colman's advertising agency, with support from the New Zealand Broadcasting Corporation (NZBC), the New Zealand Federation of Phonographic Industries and the Australasian Performing Rights Society (APRA), with the awards named after Reckitt & Colman's anti-dandruff shampoo, Loxene.

While initially only one prize was given, other awards were added, including categories for record cover, recording artist of the year, and a producer award. From 1970, two awards were given—one to a solo artist, the other to a group however there was still just one supreme award, selected from these two.

The Loxene Golden Disc awards continued until 1972 when the New Zealand Federation of Phonographic Industry decided to institute its own system; these awards became known as the Recording Arts Talent Awards (RATA). From 1978 the awards became known as the RIANZ Awards after the NZFPI changed its name to the Recording Industry Association of New Zealand (RIANZ).

In 1996 and 1997 the awards were merged with the Entertainer of the Year Awards and were known as the Clear Music and Entertainment Awards, sponsored by Clear Communications. From 1998 the awards reverted to music only, with the name going back to the New Zealand Music Awards and the award trophy nicknamed the Tui. Also in 1999 Coca-Cola New Zealand became the naming rights sponsor of the awards, known as the Coca-Cola New Zealand Music Awards for one year only.

Since 2004, the show's principal sponsor has been Vodafone New Zealand. With Vodafone's sponsorship, the awards became known as the Vodafone New Zealand Music Awards (VNZMA's).

In 2008 the awards ceremony moved to Vector Arena in Auckland, New Zealand. Prior to this move the event was primarily invitation only, and the increased size of the Vector Arena enabled the event to be attended both by invitation and by the public through sale tickets. While the Loxene Golden Disc award was televised in the 1970s, broadcasting of the contemporary award ceremony started in 2004.

In 2020, the awards were renamed the Aotearoa Music Awards; its acronym doubly serves to mean a waka's outrigger (ama), reflecting the awards' goal of supporting the local music industry.

No public or televised ceremony was held for the 2022 awards due concerns around the ongoing COVID-19 pandemic.

In 2023, no awards were held, due to RMNZ choosing to review the format. From 2024, the awards were moved from November to May to coincide with New Zealand Music Month; nominations for the 2024 awards, held 30 May, had an extended eligibility period dating back to 2022.

== New Zealand Music Hall of Fame ==
Created in 2007 in conjunction with the Australasian Performing Right Association (APRA), the New Zealand Music Hall of Fame pays tribute to those who have "shaped, influenced and advanced popular music in New Zealand." Two musicians or groups are inducted into the hall each year, one at the APRA Silver Scroll Awards, decided by APRA, and the other is the winner of the Legacy Award at the Aotearoa Music Awards, selected by Recorded Music NZ.

== Critics Choice award ==
Awarded from 2010 until 2016, the Critics' Choice Prize was given to artists who were expected to be successful in the music industry in the future. To be eligible for the award, an artist must have neither released a studio album nor have been nominated for a New Zealand Music Award in the past.

== List of ceremonies ==
No.	Ceremony	Date	Broadcaster(s)	Most wins	Album of the Year winner	Single of the Year winner	Host(s)	Venue	Ref.
1	1965 Loxene Golden Disc	25 November 1965	NZBC	—N/a	No Album of the Year award given	Ray Columbus and the Invaders – "Till We Kissed"	Neville Chamberlain	White Heron Lodge, Wellington	
2	1966 Loxene Golden Disc	9 November 1966	NZBC	—N/a	No Album of the Year award given	Maria Dallas – "Tumblin' Down"	Neville Chamberlain	White Heron Lodge, Wellington	
3	1967 Loxene Golden Disc	4 November 1967	NZBC	—N/a	No Album of the Year award given	Mr. Lee Grant – "Thanks to You"	Peter Sinclair	White Heron Lodge, Wellington	
4	1968 Loxene Golden Disc	7 November 1968	NZBC	—N/a	No Album of the Year award given	Allison Durbin – "I Have Loved Me a Man"	Peter Sinclair	Intercontinental Hotel, Auckland	
5	1969 Loxene Golden Disc	15 October 1969	NZBC	—N/a	No Album of the Year award given	The Hi-Revving Tongues – "Rain and Tears"	Peter Sinclair	Intercontinental Hotel, Auckland	
6	1970 Loxene Golden Disc	22 October 1970	NZBC	—N/a	No Album of the Year award given	Hogsnort Rupert – "Pretty Girl"	Peter Sinclair	Grand Opera House	
7	1971 Loxene Golden Disc	2 November 1971	NZBC	—N/a	No Album of the Year award given	Craig Scott – "Smiley"	Peter Sinclair	Opera House, Palmerston North	
8	1972 Loxene Golden Disc	14 November 1972	NZBC	—N/a	No Album of the Year award given	Creation – "Carolina"	Peter Sinclair	Christchurch Town Hall	
9	1973 RATA Award	1973	Unknown	Shona Laing (2 awards)	John Donoghue – Spirit of Pelorus Jack	John Hanlon – "Damn the Dam"	Unknown	Trillo's, Auckland	
10	1974 RATA Award	1974	Unknown	Mike Harvey (2 awards)	No Album of the Year award given	John Hanlon – "Is It Natural"	Unknown	Unknown	
11	1975 RATA Award	1975	Unknown	John Hanlon (2 awards)	John Hanlon – Higher Trails	Rockinghorse – "Through the Moonlight"	Unknown	Unknown	
12	1976 RATA Award	1976	Unknown	Dr Tree (2 awards)	New Zealand Symphony Orchestra – Symphony #2	No Single of the Year award given	Unknown	Trillo's, Auckland	
No awards were presented in 1977									
13	1978 RIANZ Music Awards	1978	TV One	Hello Sailor (2 awards)	Hello Sailor – Hello Sailor	Golden Harvest – "I Need Your Love"	Stu Dennison	Avalon Studios	
14	1979 RIANZ Music Awards	23 November 1979	TV One	Th' Dudes (2 awards)	Street Talk – Street Talk	Th' Dudes – "Be Mine Tonight"	Unknown	Mandalay, Auckland	
15	1980 RIANZ Music Awards	1980	Unknown	Jon Stevens (3 awards)	Sharon O'Neill – Sharon O'Neill	Jon Stevens – Montego Bay	Unknown	Logan Park Hotel, Auckland	
16	1981 RIANZ Music Awards	1981	Unknown	Dave McArtney and the Pink Flamingos (4 awards)	Dave McArtney and the Pink Flamingos – Dave McArtney and the Pink Flamingos	Coup D'État – "Doctor, I Like Your Medicine"	Unknown	Logan Park Hotel, Auckland	
17	1982 RIANZ Music Awards	1982	Unknown	DD Smash (4 awards)	DD Smash – Cool Bananas	Prince Tui Teka – "E Ipo"	Unknown	Logan Park Hotel, Auckland	
18	1983 New Zealand Music Awards	November 1983	TV One	DD Smash (4 awards)	DD Smash – Live: Deep in the Heart of Taxes	DD Smash – "Outlook For Thursday"	Karyn Hay and Phillip Schofield	Michael Fowler Centre	
19	1984 New Zealand Music Awards	1984	TV One	Dance Exponents (3 awards)	Dance Exponents – Prayers Be Answered	The Narcs – "You Took Me Heart and Soul"	Karyn Hay and Phillip Schofield	Michael Fowler Centre	
20	1985 New Zealand Music Awards	1985	TV One	Netherworld Dancing Toys (3 awards)	Netherworld Dancing Toys – Painted Years	Netherworld Dancing Toys – "For Today"	Unknown	Michael Fowler Centre	
21	1986 New Zealand Music Awards	November 1986	Unknown	Peking Man (5 awards)	Peking Man – Peking Man	Peking Man – "Room That Echoes"	Unknown	Sheraton Hotel, Auckland	
22	1987 New Zealand Music Awards	1987	Unknown	Dave Dobbyn (4 awards)	Herbs – Sensitive to a Smile	Dave Dobbyn – "You Oughta Be In Love"	Unknown	Sheraton Hotel, Auckland	
23	1988 New Zealand Music Awards	1988	Unknown	Holidaymakers (4 awards)	Dave Dobbyn – Loyal	Holidaymakers – "Sweet Lovers"	Unknown	Sheraton Hotel, Auckland	
24	1989 New Zealand Music Awards	1989	Unknown	Margaret Urlich (3 awards)	Margaret Urlich – Safety In Numbers	Margaret Urlich – "Escaping"	Unknown	Sheraton Hotel, Auckland	
25	1990 New Zealand Music Awards	March 1990	Unknown	The Chills (4 awards)	The Chills – Submarine Bells	The Chills – "Heavenly Pop Hit"	Unknown	Unknown	
No awards were presented in 1991									
26	1992 Pepsi New Zealand Music Awards	6 April 1992	TV2	Headless Chickens & The Exponents (2 awards)	Headless Chickens – Body Blow	The Exponents – "Why Does Love Do This To Me"	Unknown	Aotea Centre	
27	1993 Pepsi New Zealand Music Awards	1993	TV2	The Mutton Birds (3 awards)	The Mutton Birds – The Mutton Birds	The Mutton Birds – "Nature"	Simon Barnett	Powerstation	
28	1994 New Zealand Music Awards	11 April 1994	TV2	Headless Chickens (3 awards)	Straitjacket Fits – Blow	Headless Chickens – "Juice"/"Choppers"	Unknown	Pan Pacific Hotel	
29	1995 New Zealand Music Awards	12 April 1995	—N/a	Supergroove (4 awards)	Supergroove – Traction	Purest Form – "Message to My Girl"	Unknown	Carlton Hotel	
30	1996 Clear Music and Entertainment Awards	13 April 1996	TV3	Shihad (4 awards)	Shihad – Killjoy	OMC – "How Bizarre"	Unknown	Aotea Centre	
31	1997 Clear Music and Entertainment Awards	3 May 1997	TV3	Che Fu (3 awards)	Strawpeople – Vicarious	DLT featuring Che Fu – "Chains"	Unknown	Aotea Centre	
32	1998 New Zealand Music Awards	23 April 1998	TV2	Bic Runga (4 awards)	Bic Runga – Drive	Bic Runga – "Sway"	Jon Bridges, Petra Bagust and Nathan Rarere	Aotea Centre	
33	Coca-Cola New Zealand Music Awards	13 March 1999	TV3/C4	The Feelers (4 awards)	The Feelers – Supersystem	Che Fu – "Scene III"	Jon Bridges, Nathan Rarere, and Jackie Clarke	Auckland Town Hall	
34	2000 New Zealand Music Awards	4 March 2000	Sky 1/Juice TV	Stellar (5 awards)	Stellar – Mix	Stellar – "Violent"	Marcus Lush	Civic Theatre	
35	2001 New Zealand Music Awards	2 March 2001	TV2	Zed (3 awards)	Zed – Silencer	Fur Patrol – "Lydia"	Francesca Rudkin	Civic Theatre	
36	2002 New Zealand Music Awards	10 May 2002 (Note: The awards date was moved to May to coincide with New Zealand Music Month.)	TV2	Che Fu (4 awards)	Che Fu – The Navigator	Che Fu – "Fade Away"	Erika Takacs and Marcus Lush	St James Theatre	
37	2003 New Zealand Music Awards	30 April 2003	TV3	The Datsuns & Bic Runga (4 awards)	The Datsuns – The Datsuns	Goodshirt – "Sophie"	Oliver Driver and Lucy Lawless	Aotea Centre	
38	2004 Vodafone New Zealand Music Awards	22 September 2004 (Note: The awards date was moved to spring so winners and nominees could benefit from the Christmas selling period.)	C4	Scribe (6 awards)	Scribe – The Crusader	Scribe – "Stand Up"	Jaquie Brown and Mikey Havoc	Aotea Centre	
39	2005 Vodafone New Zealand Music Awards	5 October 2005	C4	Fat Freddy's Drop (4 awards)	Fat Freddy's Drop – Based on a True Story	Breaks Co-Op – "The Otherside"	Jaquie Brown and Oliver Driver	Aotea Centre	
40	2006 Vodafone New Zealand Music Awards	18 October 2006	C4	Bic Runga (4 awards)	Bic Runga – Birds	Pluto – "Long White Cross"	Jaquie Brown and Oliver Driver	Aotea Centre	
41	2007 Vodafone New Zealand Music Awards	18 October 2007	C4	The Mint Chicks (5 awards)	The Mint Chicks – Crazy? Yes! Dumb? No!	Evermore – "Light Surrounding You"	Dai Henwood	Aotea Centre	
42	2008 Vodafone New Zealand Music Awards	8 October 2008	C4	Flight of the Conchords & Opshop (4 awards)	Flight of the Conchords – Flight of the Conchords	Opshop – "One Day"	Dai Henwood	Vector Arena	
43	2009 Vodafone New Zealand Music Awards	8 October 2009	C4	Ladyhawke (6 awards)	Ladyhawke – Ladyhawke	Ladyhawke – "My Delirium"	Dai Henwood	Vector Arena	
44	2010 Vodafone New Zealand Music Awards	7 October 2010	C4	Gin Wigmore & Stan Walker (4 awards)	Gin Wigmore – Holy Smoke	Kids of 88 – "Just a Little Bit"	Shannon Ryan and Ben Hurley	Vector Arena	
45	2011 Vodafone New Zealand Music Awards	3 November 2011	Four	The Naked and Famous (7 awards)	The Naked and Famous – Passive Me, Aggressive You	The Naked and Famous – "Young Blood"	Shannon Ryan and Ben Boyce	Vector Arena	
46	2012 Vodafone New Zealand Music Awards	1 November 2012	Four	Six60 (6 awards)	Kimbra – Vows	Six60 – "Don't Forget Your Roots"	Shannon Ryan and Ben Boyce	Vector Arena	
47	2013 Vodafone New Zealand Music Awards	21 November 2013	Four	Lorde & Aaradhna (4 awards)	Aaradhna – Treble & Reverb	Lorde – "Royals"	Shannon Ryan and Stan Walker	Vector Arena	
48	2014 Vodafone New Zealand Music Awards	20 November 2014	Four	Lorde (6 awards)	Lorde – Pure Heroine	Lorde – "Team"	Shannon Ryan and Dai Henwood	Vector Arena	
49	2015 Vodafone New Zealand Music Awards	19 November 2015	TV3	Broods (4 awards)	Broods – Evergreen	Lorde – "Yellow Flicker Beat"	Taika Waititi (Note: Sharyn Casey and Dominic Bowden hosted the TV broadcast.)	Vector Arena	
50	2016 Vodafone New Zealand Music Awards	17 November 2016	TV3	Broods (5 awards)	Broods – Conscious	Broods – "Free"	Jono Pryor and Ben Boyce	Vector Arena	
51	2017 Vodafone New Zealand Music Awards	16 November 2017	Three	Lorde (6 awards)	Lorde - Melodrama	Lorde - "Green Light"	Jono Pryor and Ben Boyce	Spark Arena	
52	2018 Vodafone New Zealand Music Awards	15 November 2018	Three	Six60 (4 awards)	Marlon Williams - Make Way for Love	Drax Project - "Woke Up Late"	Kanoa Lloyd and Stan Walker	Spark Arena	
53	2019 Vodafone New Zealand Music Awards	14 November 2019	Three	Benee (4 awards)	Avantdale Bowling Club – Avantdale Bowling Club	Benee – "Soaked"	Laura Daniel and Jon Toogood	Spark Arena	
54	2020 Aotearoa Music Awards	15 November 2020	The Edge TV (7–8:30); Three (8:30–10:30)	Benee (4 awards)	The Beths – Jump Rope Gazers	Benee – "Supalonely"	Sharyn Casey and Jayden King (7–8:30); Jesse Mulligan (8:30–10:30)	Spark Arena	
55	2021 Aotearoa Music Awards	17 December 2021	TVNZ 2	L.A.B. (5 awards)	L.A.B. – L.A.B. IV	L.A.B. – "Why Oh Why"	Hayley Sproull and Stan Walker	Kiri Te Kanawa Theatre, Aotea Centre	
56	2022 Aotearoa Music Awards	10 November 2022	— (Note: Due to the ongoing COVID-19 pandemic, a traditional public ceremony wasn't held.)	L.A.B. (4 awards)	L.A.B. – L.A.B. V	L.A.B. – "Mr Reggae"	—N/a		
No awards were presented in 2023									
57	2024 Aotearoa Music Awards	30 May 2024 (Note: The awards date was again moved to May to coincide with New Zealand Music Month, as it was in 2002.)	Radio New Zealand (Note: The awards were broadcast live on RNZ, and recorded for streaming on TVNZ+.)	The Beths & Tom Scott (2 awards)	The Beths – Expert in a Dying Field	Avantdale Bowling Club – "Friday Night at the Liquor Store"	Kara Rickard and Jesse Mulligan	Viaduct Events Centre	
58	2025 Aotearoa Music Awards	29 May 2025	Radio New Zealand	Fazerdaze & Stan Walker (2 awards)	Fazerdaze – Soft Power	Charli XCX featuring Lorde – "Girl, So Confusing featuring Lorde"	Kara Rickard and Jesse Mulligan	Viaduct Events Centre	
59	2026 Aotearoa Music Awards	28 May 2026	Radio New Zealand	Marlon Williams (2)	Marlon Williams – Te Whare Tīwekaweka	Marlon Williams – "Aua Atu Rā"	—	Civic Theatre	

== Winners by year ==
=== 1978–current ===
- Album of the Year
- Single of the Year
- Best Group
- Best Solo Artist
- Breakthrough Artist of the Year
- Best Alternative Artist
- Best Children's Album
- Best Classical Artist
- Best Country Album
- Best Electronic Artist
- Best Folk Album
- Best Hip Hop Artist and Best Soul/RnB Artist
- Best Jazz Album
- Best Māori Artist
- Best Pacific Music Album
- Best Pop Artist
- Best Rock Artist
- Best Roots Artist
- Best Soul/RnB Artist
- Best Worship Artist
- Highest Selling New Zealand Artist
- Radio Airplay Record of the Year
- International Achievement
- People's Choice Award
- Critics' Choice Prize
- Legacy Award

Artisan Awards

- Best Album Cover
- Best Music Video
- Best Engineer
- Best Producer
