= The Naked and Famous discography =

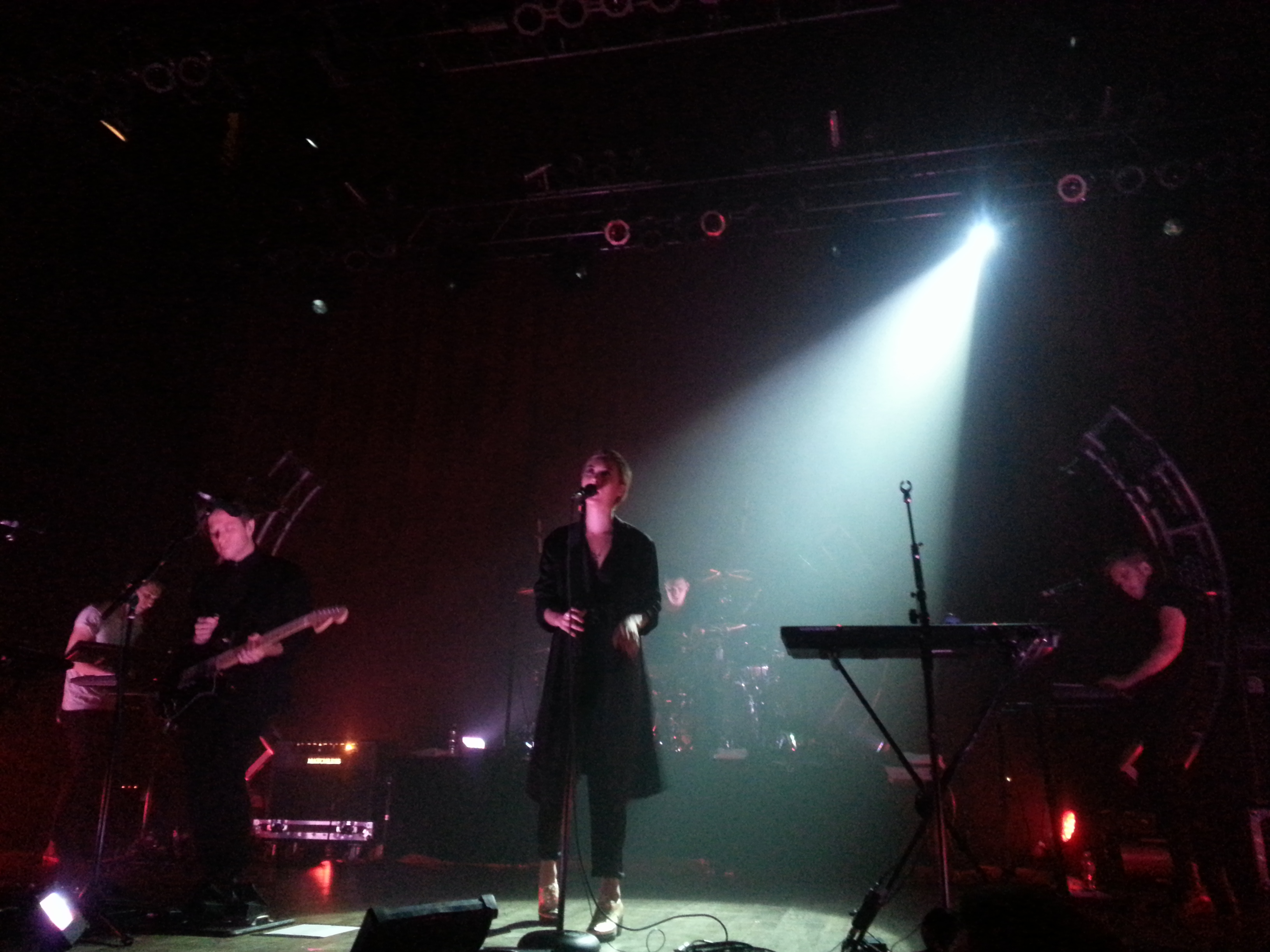
- The Naked and Famous performing in October 2013
- Studio albums: 4
- EPs: 3
- Compilation albums: 2
- Singles: 18
- Video albums: 2
- Music videos: 16
- Promotional singles: 7

New Zealand indie electronic band the Naked and Famous have released four studio albums, two compilation albums, three extended plays, 18 singles (including one as a featured artist), seven promotional singles, two video albums and 16 music videos.

== Albums ==
=== Studio albums ===
List of studio albums, with selected chart positions and certifications
Title	Details	Peak chart positions										Certifications
Title	Details	NZ	AUS	AUT	CAN	GER	IRE	NL	SWI	UK	US	Certifications
Passive Me, Aggressive You	Released: 6 September 2010; Label: Somewhat Damaged; Formats: CD, LP, digital download	1	25	56	—	31	38	74	74	25	91	RMNZ: Gold; BPI: Silver
In Rolling Waves	Released: 13 September 2013; Label: Somewhat Damaged; Formats: CD, LP, digital download	4	12	33	23	96	68	—	34	53	48	
Simple Forms	Released: 14 October 2016; Label: Somewhat Damaged; Formats: CD, LP, digital download	15	37	—	67	—	—	—	—	— (Note: Simple Forms did not enter the UK Albums Chart, but peaked at number 53 on the UK Album Downloads Chart.)	110	
Recover	Released: 24 July 2020; Label: Somewhat Damaged; Formats: CD, LP, digital download, streaming	— (Note: Recover did not enter the NZ Top 40 Albums Chart, but peaked at number 19 on the Top 20 NZ Albums Chart.)	—	—	—	—	—	—	—	— (Note: Recover did not enter the UK Albums Chart, but peaked at number 61 on the UK Album Downloads Chart.)	— (Note: Recover did not enter the US Billboard 200, but peaked at number 92 on the US Billboard Album Sales chart.)	
"—" denotes a recording that did not chart or was not released in that territory.

=== Compilation albums ===
Title	Details
Passive Me, Aggressive You (Remixes & B-Sides)	Released: 15 April 2013; Label: Somewhat Damaged; Formats: LP, digital download
A Still Heart	Released: 2 March 2018; Label: Island; Format: Digital download

== Extended plays ==
Title	Details
This Machine	Released: 5 May 2008; Label: Round Trip Mars; Formats: CD, digital download
No Light	Released: 8 September 2008; Label: Round Trip Mars; Formats: CD, digital download
This Machine / No Light	Released: 16 April 2011; Label: Universal Republic; Format: CD

== Singles ==
=== As lead artist ===
List of singles as lead artist, with selected chart positions and certifications, showing year released and album name
Title	Year	Peak chart positions										Certifications	Album
Title	Year	NZ	AUS	AUT	CAN Rock	FRA	GER	NL	UK	US Bub.	US Rock	Certifications	Album
"Kill the Littleblackdots"	2008	—	—	—	—	—	—	—	—	—	—		This Machine
"All of This"	2009	—	—	—	—	—	—	—	—	—	—		Passive Me, Aggressive You
"Young Blood"	2010	1	26	53	26	145	30	59	64	14	21	RMNZ: 3× Platinum; ARIA: Platinum; BVMI: Gold; RIAA: 2× Platinum	Passive Me, Aggressive You
"Punching in a Dream"	2010	11	56	—	26	—	—	—	120	—	33	ARIA: Gold; BPI: Silver; RMNZ: Platinum	Passive Me, Aggressive You
"Crazy? Yes! Dumb? No!" (The Mint Chicks cover)	2011	—	—	—	—	—	—	—	—	—	—		Non-album single
"Girls Like You"	2011	—	—	—	—	—	—	—	— (Note: "Girls Like You" did not enter the UK Singles Chart, but peaked at number 16 on the UK Physical Singles Chart Top 100.)	—	—		Passive Me, Aggressive You
"Hearts Like Ours"	2013	— (Note: "Hearts Like Ours" did not enter the NZ Top 40 Singles Chart, but peaked at number 13 on the Top 20 NZ Singles Chart.)	83	—	—	—	—	—	—	—	— (Note: "Hearts Like Ours" did not enter the Hot Rock & Alternative Songs chart, but peaked at number 26 on the Alternative Airplay chart.)		In Rolling Waves
"Higher"	2016	— (Note: "Higher" did not enter the New Zealand Singles Chart, but peaked at number two on the New Zealand Heatseeker Singles Chart.)	—	—	47	—	—	—	—	—	45	RMNZ: Gold	Simple Forms
"Laid Low"	2016	—	—	—	—	—	—	—	—	—	—		Simple Forms
"The Runners"	2016	—	—	—	—	—	—	—	—	—	—		Simple Forms
"A Still Heart"	2017	—	—	—	—	—	—	—	—	—	—		A Still Heart
"Sunseeker"	2019	— (Note: "Sunseeker" did not enter the New Zealand Singles Chart, but peaked at number 9 on the Hot NZ Singles Chart.)	—	—	—	—	—	—	—	—	—		Recover
"Bury Us"	2020	— (Note: "Bury Us" did not enter the New Zealand Singles Chart, but peaked at number 10 on the Hot NZ Singles Chart.)	—	—	—	—	—	—	—	—	—		Recover
"Come as You Are"	2020	— (Note: "Come as You Are" did not enter the New Zealand Singles Chart, but peaked at number 13 on the Hot NZ Singles Chart.)	—	—	—	—	—	—	—	—	—		Recover
"Blinding Lights"	2020	—	—	—	—	—	—	—	—	—	—		Non-album single
"Death"	2020	— (Note: "Death" did not enter the New Zealand Singles Chart, but peaked at number 8 on the Hot NZ Singles Chart.)	—	—	—	—	—	—	—	—	—		Recover
"Recover"	2020	— (Note: "Recover" did not enter the New Zealand Singles Chart, but peaked at number 16 on the Hot NZ Singles Chart.)	—	—	—	—	—	—	—	—	—		Recover
"—" denotes a recording that did not chart or was not released in that territory.

=== As featured artist ===
List of singles as featured artist, with selected chart positions, showing year released and album name
Title	Year	Peaks	Album
Title	Year	NZ	Album
"Team Ball Player Thing" (as part of #KiwisCureBatten)	2015	2	Non-album single
"alone/forever"	2018	—	vital

=== Promotional singles ===
Title	Year	Album
"I Kill Giants"	2013	In Rolling Waves
"What We Want"	2014	In Rolling Waves
"Higher" (Stripped)	2017	A Still Heart
"Last Forever" (Stripped)	2017	A Still Heart
"Punching in a Dream" (Stripped)	2017	A Still Heart
"Girls Like You" (Stripped)	2018	A Still Heart
"Young Blood" (Stripped)	2018	A Still Heart

=== Other charting songs ===
List of songs with selected chart positions, showing year released and album name
Title	Year	Peak chart positions		Album
Title	Year	NZ Hot	MEX Air.	Album
"No Way"	2012	—	45	Passive Me, Aggressive You
"Everybody Knows"	2020	8	—	Recover
"—" denotes a recording that did not chart or was not released in that territory.

== Guest appearances ==
List of non-single guest appearances, showing year released and album name
Title	Year	Album
"Easy Life"	2011	Kiwi Hit Disc 134 – February | 2011
"Young Blood" (Renholdër Remix)	2012	Underworld: Awakening (Original Motion Picture Soundtrack)
"Following Morning"	2013	Dallas Buyers Club (Music from and Inspired By)

== Remixes ==
List of remixes for other artists, showing year released
Title	Year	Artist
"Lead or Follow"	2010	Shihad
"Rescue Song"	2010	Mr Little Jeans
"Austere"	2011	The Joy Formidable
"Mountaineer"	2011	White Sea
"Ffunny Ffriends"	2011	Unknown Mortal Orchestra
"Reunion"	2012	M83
"Crazier"	2017	CuckooLander
"Material Boy"	2020	Sir Sly

== Videography ==
=== Video albums ===
Title	Album details
One Temporary Escape	Released: 18 March 2013; Label: Somewhat Damaged; Format: Digital download
A Still Heart (Live)	Released: 8 June 2018; Label: Somewhat Damaged; Formats: Streaming

=== Music videos ===
List of music videos, showing year released and directors
Title	Year	Director(s)	Ref.
"Serenade"	2008	Campbell Hooper and Joel Kefali (Special Problems)	
"Birds"	2008	Campbell Hooper and Joel Kefali (Special Problems)	
"All of This"	2009	Campbell Hooper and Joel Kefali (Special Problems)	
"Young Blood"	2010	Campbell Hooper and Joel Kefali (Special Problems)	
"Punching in a Dream"	2010	Campbell Hooper and Joel Kefali (Special Problems)	
"Girls Like You"	2010	Campbell Hooper and Joel Kefali (Special Problems)	
"The Sun"	2011	Campbell Hooper and Joel Kefali (Special Problems)	
"No Way"	2011	Campbell Hooper and Joel Kefali (Special Problems)	
"Hearts Like Ours"	2013	Campbell Hooper	
"I Kill Giants"	2013	Joel Kefali	
"Young Blood" (Stripped)	2018	Morgan Freed	
"Sunseeker"	2019	Taylor Fauntleroy	
"Bury Us"	2020	Thomas Powers, Alisa Xayalith, Stefan Vleming-Critz and Jori Teplitzky	
"Come as You Are"	2020	FrankNitty3000	
"Recover"	2020	Thomas Powers, Alisa Xayalith and Jori Teplitzky	
"Everybody Knows"	2020	Thomas Powers, Alisa Xayalith and Jori Teplitzky	
