= A Still Heart =

Compilation album by The Naked and Famous
- Released: 2 March 2018
- Studio: Preston
- Genre: Acoustic
- Length: 39:15
- Label: Island
- Producers: The Naked and Famous; Thomas Powers

The Naked and Famous chronology
| Simple Forms (2016) | A Still Heart (2018) | Recover (2020) |

A Still Heart is the second compilation album from New Zealand electronic music band The Naked and Famous. The album was released on 2 March 2018 in Australia and New Zealand, and 9 March in the United States. It features acoustic performances of several of the songs from previous studio albums.

== Background ==
After touring in support of Simple Forms, their third studio album, the ensemble returned to Los Angeles to begin an acoustic project. In September 2017, the ensemble released the title track "A Still Heart", a portmanteau of songs "A Stillness" and "Hearts Like Ours". "Punching in a Dream" was released at the end of 2017. In February 2018, the band announced the release date for the compilation.

== Track listing ==
All tracks are written by Thom Powers, Alisa Xayalith & Aaron Short, except where noted.

| No. | Title | Writer(s) | Length |
|---|---|---|---|
| 1. | "A Still Heart" | | 3:50 |
| 2. | "Punching in a Dream" (Stripped) | | 3:28 |
| 3. | "Last Forever" (Stripped) | Powers; Xayalith; Short; Jesse Wood; David Beadle | 3:50 |
| 4. | "All of This" (Stripped) | | 4:01 |
| 5. | "Girls Like You" (Stripped) | | 4:14 |
| 6. | "Higher" (Stripped) | Powers; Xayalith | 4:02 |
| 7. | "I Kill Giants" (Stripped) | Powers; Xayalith | 4:05 |
| 8. | "No Way" (Stripped) | | 4:30 |
| 9. | "Teardrop" (Stripped) | Robert Del Naja; Grantley Marshall; Andrew Vowles; Elizabeth Fraser | 3:26 |
| 10. | "Young Blood" (Stripped) | | 3:49 |
| Total length: | | | 39:15 |

== Personnel ==
Credits adapted from digital booklet.

- Ken Andrews – mixing
- Bradley Hale – artwork
- Joel Kefali – artwork
- Joe LaPorta – mastering
- The Naked and Famous – producer, performer
- Thomas Powers – producer

== Release history ==
| Region | Date | Label | Format | Ref. |
|---|---|---|---|---|
| New Zealand | 2 March 2018 | Island | Digital download | |
| Australia | 2 March 2018 | Island | Digital download | |
| Canada | 9 March 2018 | Somewhat Damaged | Digital download | |
| Germany | 9 March 2018 | Somewhat Damaged | Digital download | |
| United Kingdom | 9 March 2018 | Somewhat Damaged | Digital download | |
| United States | 9 March 2018 | Somewhat Damaged | Digital download | |
