= One Temporary Escape =

Video by The Naked and Famous
- Released: 18 March 2013
- Recorded: 21 April 2012 at The Warfield, San Francisco, California, United States
- Genre: Post-punk revival, synthpop
- Length: 66:23
- Label: Somewhat Damaged
- Director: Jordan Blady
- Producer: Aaron Short; Jordan Blady; Thom Powers

One Temporary Escape is a live video album from New Zealand post-punk revival band The Naked and Famous, recorded on 21 April 2012 at The Warfield in San Francisco, California. It was directed by Jordan Blady, produced by Aaron Short, Jordan Blady and Thom Powers, and executive produced by The Naked and Famous. The video was released on 18 March 2013 as a free download, to thank fans for their support.

== Premise ==
The video was created following a constant two-year tour for Passive Me, Aggressive You. Thom Powers, guitarist and vocalist for the ensemble, stated that because large outdoor performances and television concerts often end up on the internet, the best thing to do was to record their own live album and provide it to fans to show gratitude, stating that One Temporary Escape is likely the best presentation of the band's live performance.

== Track listing ==
All tracks are written by Thom Powers, Aaron Short and Alisa Xayalith

No.	Title	Length
1.	"Intro"	1:40
2.	"All of This"	4:00
3.	"Punching in a Dream"	4:20
4.	"Spank"	4:30
5.	"The Sun"	3:50
6.	"The Source"	1:00
7.	"Bells"	3:55
8.	"Frayed"	4:00
9.	"Eyes"	4:00
10.	"No Way"	4:50
11.	"Jilted Lovers"	5:30
12.	"The Ends"	3:45
13.	"A Wolf in Geek's Clothing"	1:50
14.	"Girls Like You"	4:35
15.	"Interlude"	4:00
16.	"Dadada"	3:30
17.	"Young Blood"	4:55
18.	"Credits"	2:43
Total length:		66:23

== Personnel ==
- Aaron Short — keyboard
- Alisa Xayalith — lead vocals, keyboard
- David Beadle — bass
- Jesse Wood — drums
- Thom Powers — vocals, guitar

== Trivia ==
On April 21, 2012 (when One Temporary Escape was recorded), Now, Now and The Vacationers performed as opening acts for The Naked and Famous.
