= Passive Me, Aggressive You (Remixes & B-Sides) =

Compilation album by The Naked and Famous
- Released: 15 April 2013
- Genre: Post-punk revival; synth-pop; indietronica
- Length: 91:31
- Label: Somewhat Damaged
- Producer: Thom Powers; Aaron Short

The Naked and Famous chronology
Passive Me, Aggressive You (2010)	Passive Me, Aggressive You (Remixes & B-Sides) (2013)	In Rolling Waves (2013)

Passive Me, Aggressive You (Remixes & B-Sides) (stylised as Passive Me • Aggressive You (Remixes + B-Sides)) is the first compilation album by New Zealand indie electronic band The Naked and Famous. Released on 15 April 2013, the album contains remixes and B-sides from their debut studio album, Passive Me, Aggressive You (2010), along with the song "A Source of Light", a collaboration with New Zealand duo Kids of 88.

== Background ==
Thom Powers, guitarist and vocalist for the band stated that because some of their tunes mysteriously vanished, and that some parts of the world were unable to procure some of their songs, that this album was a way to package all of the rare and unheard tracks.

== Track listing ==
Vinyl and disc one
No.	Title	Writer(s)	Length
1.	"Crazy? Yes! Dumb? No!" (The Mint Chicks cover)	Reuben Nielson	6:30
2.	"Sow"	Thom Powers; Alisa Xayalith; Aaron Short	4:06
3.	"Bright Lights"	Powers; Xayalith; Short	2:39
4.	"A Source of Light" (The Naked and Famous vs Kids of 88)	Powers; Xayalith; Short; Sam McCarthy; Joel Little	5:02
5.	"Wild"	Powers; Xayalith; Short	3:53
6.	"Machinery"	Powers; Xayalith; Short	2:35
7.	"No Way (Quiet)"	Powers; Xayalith; Short	5:37
Total length:			27:22

Disc two
No.	Title	Length
1.	"All of This" (James Duncan Remix)	5:07
2.	"A Wolf in Geek's Clothing" (OPOSSOM Remix)	3:55
3.	"Girls Like You" (Felix da Housecat Remix)	5:56
4.	"No Way" (Co-Pilots Remix)	4:03
5.	"Punching in a Dream" (Does It Offend You, Yeah? Remix)	3:41
6.	"Punching in a Dream" (Unknown Mortal Orchestra Remix)	4:20
7.	"The Ends" (Young Magic Remix)	3:54
8.	"The Sun" (The Sight Below Remix)	5:40
9.	"The Sun" (The Drunken Apaches Remix)	7:40
10.	"Young Blood" (The Sound of Arrows Remix)	6:23
11.	"Young Blood" (Renholdër Remix)	4:14
12.	"Young Blood" (White Sea Remix)	4:59
13.	"Young Blood" (Chiddy Bang Remix)	3:36
14.	"Young Blood" (Magik Johnson Remix)	5:48
15.	"Young Blood" (David Andrew Sitek Remix)	3:44
Total length:		64:09

== Personnel ==
Credits adapted from the digital booklet of Passive Me, Aggressive You (Remixes & B-Sides).

The Naked and Famous

- Aaron Short
- Alisa Xayalith
- David Beadle
- Jesse Wood
- Thom Powers

Visuals and imagery

- Special Problems – artwork, design, video

Technical and production

- Thom Powers – production, engineering (disc 1)
- Aaron Short – production, engineering (disc 1)
- Oliver Harmer – additional engineering (disc 1)
- Billy Bush – mixing (disc 1)
- Sam McCarthy – mixing (track: 4, disc 1)
- Jordan Arts – mixing (track: 4, disc 1)
- Emily Lazar – mastering (disc 1)
- Joe LaPorta – mastering (disc 1)
- Angus McNaughton – mastering (disc 2)

Managerial

- Paul McKessar – management
- Campbell Smith – management
- Peter Lewit – legal

== Release history ==
Region	Date	Label	Format	Ref.
United Kingdom	15 April 2013	Somewhat Damaged; Fiction	LP + digital download	
New Zealand	17 May 2013	Somewhat Damaged	Digital download	
Australia	17 May 2013	Somewhat Damaged	Digital download	
Germany	17 May 2013	Somewhat Damaged	Digital download	
Japan	17 May 2013	Somewhat Damaged	Digital download	
United Kingdom	17 May 2013	Somewhat Damaged	Digital download	
Canada	20 May 2013	Somewhat Damaged	Digital download	
United States	20 May 2013	Somewhat Damaged	Digital download	
