= Dallas Buyers Club (soundtrack) =

Dallas Buyers Club (Music from and Inspired by the Motion Picture)

Soundtrack album by Various artists
- Released: October 30, 2013
- Genre: Pop; retro; jazz; Western folk; Western classical
- Length: 1:04:40
- Label: Relativity Music Group
- Compiler: Susan Jacobs

Dallas Buyers Club (Music from and Inspired by the Motion Picture) is the soundtrack/compilation album to the 2013 film Dallas Buyers Club, released by Relativity Music Group on October 30, 2013. The album, which consisted of original and incorporated songs, featured various artists, include Jared Leto's band Thirty Seconds to Mars, Tegan and Sara, Awolnation, The Naked and Famous, T. Rex, My Morning Jacket, Fitz and the Tantrums, Blondfire, Neon Trees, Cold War Kids, Capital Cities, The Airborne Toxic Event, and more.

== Promotion and release ==
The film does not have an original score, but featured several songs played throughout the film. The official soundtrack was announced on October 16, 2013, featuring 16 original and incorporated songs in the album. It was announced for a digital and physical release on October 30, 2013, with pre-orders beginning through Amazon.com and iTunes. On the same date, the first song "Shudder to Think" performed by Tegan and Sara was released. Rolling Stone wrote that the band "combine dreamy synths with reflective lyrics on the effervescent track, musing on the chances not taken and the prospect of a life without someone special". They also performed the track at the European tour in November 2013. On October 25, 2013, The Hollywood Reporter released the track "Romance Languages" performed by Cold War Kids. It was announced that 40 cents of every sale of album at iTunes would go to the AIDS relief charity Project Red's Global Fund. The vinyl edition of the soundtrack was released in March 2014.

== Track listing ==
Dallas Buyers Club (Music from and Inspired by the Motion Picture)
No.	Title	Artist	Length
1.	"Sweet Thang"	Shuggie Otis	4:09
2.	"Following Morning"	The Naked and Famous	5:03
3.	"Hell and Back"	The Airborne Toxic Event	3:52
4.	"Ready to Be Called On"	My Morning Jacket	3:46
5.	"Life of the Party"	Blondfire	3:23
6.	"The Walker" (Ryeland Allison remix)	Fitz and the Tantrums	3:28
7.	"Shudder to Think"	Tegan and Sara	3:24
8.	"Mad Love" (Acoustic)	Neon Trees	3:39
9.	"Main Man" (T. Rex cover)	Portugal. The Man	6:15
10.	"Stayin' Alive" (Bee Gees cover)	Capital Cities	4:03
11.	"Romance Languages"	Cold War Kids	2:52
12.	"Burn It Down" (Innerpartysystem remix)	Awolnation	4:56
13.	"After the Scripture"	Manchester Orchestra	4:36
14.	"City of Angels" (Acoustic)	Thirty Seconds to Mars	4:29
15.	"Main Man" (Live)	T. Rex	4:13
16.	"Life Is Strange"	T. Rex	2:32
Total length:			1:04:40

== Additional music ==
Film music not included in the album

#	Title	Performer(s)/Writer(s)	Ref.
1	"Purple"	Shuggie Otis	
2	"Ruby, Don't Take Your Love to Town"	Kenny Rogers	
3	"The Fool"	Sanford Clark	
4	"El Adios del Soldado"	Carolos Periguez	
5	"Follow Me"	Amanda Lear	
6	"Obsession"	Animotion	
7	"Ballrooms of Mars"	T. Rex	
8	"Prélude"	Alexandra Streliski	

== Reception ==
New Noise Magazines Joseph Tucker said, "The score on this record is incredibly diverse and of equally incredible quality, unlike so many others. Pick this up before or after you go and see Dallas Buyers Club." Matt of Homo Razzi said about the album, "Overall this soundtrack has a little bit of everything and it works perfectly, mirroring some of the themes, emotions and moments of the film." Stephanie Ochona reviewed for Renowned for Sound and gave the soundtrack 4.5 out of 5 ratings, she said, "Set in the 80s where drugs and other experimentation was all the rage, music plays a big factor in the entire atmosphere of the movie. The soundtrack includes a diverse group of artists, from country stars, indie icons and modern rockers. All the songs featured help bring out the kind of mood a movie like Dallas Buyers Club is." Ochona also said that, "Without such an accurate soundtrack, the film wouldn't have made such a big impact, and both the visual and aural aspects work together to create a beautiful story of a man fighting for the right to live his life."

Music critic Green Baron reviewed the music for Sputnikmusic, and said: "Dallas Buyers Club itself was a breathtaking motion picture driven by the extraordinary performances from Matthew McConaughey and Jared Leto. Its accompanying soundtrack, however, is less than satisfying. Filled to the brim with lifeless, stale indie-rock tracks, the supporting album to one of the year's most gripping films is a complete waste of talent and potential." Baron thought that Dallas Buyers Club was saved by a few excellent songs, which were "Ready to Be Called On", "After the Scripture", and "City of Angels". He said that, "Overall, the Dallas Buyers Club soundtrack is one that really isn't worth your time or money. Aside from three superb songs, the whole album is a collection of drab indie pop/rock that ultimately falls flat due to its lack of memorability."

== Chart performance ==
Chart (2013)	Peak position
UK Compilation Albums Chart (OCC)	34
UK Soundtracks Chart (OCC)	24
US Top Soundtracks (Billboard)	19
