= Hearts Like Ours =

Single by The Naked and Famous

from the album In Rolling Waves
- Released: 23 July 2013
- Genre: Indie pop; dream pop; indie dance; post-punk revival
- Length: 3:52
- Label: Somewhat Damaged
- Songwriters: Thom Powers; Aaron Short; Alisa Xayalith
- Producers: Powers; Short

The Naked and Famous singles chronology
"Girls Like You" (2011)	"Hearts Like Ours" (2013)	"Higher" (2016)

"Hearts Like Ours" is the first single from In Rolling Waves, the second studio album from New Zealand indie electronic band The Naked and Famous. The song, which is also the sixth single from the ensemble, premiered 23 July 2013 on BBC Radio 1 as Zane Lowe’s “Hottest Record in the World Today”. The video was released on YouTube on 29 July 2013.

== Composition and lyrics ==
Ricardo Baca of The Denver Post stated that "this latest single has some of the same electronic pop manipulation that made “Young Blood” so fun".

== Release and reception ==
The song premiered 23 July 2013 on BBC Radio 1 as Zane Lowe’s “Hottest Record in the World Today”. The video was released on YouTube on 29 July 2013.

== Video ==
The music video, directed by Campbell Hooper of Special Problems, was filmed in Los Angeles and New Zealand.

== Personnel ==
Credits adapted from the liner notes of In Rolling Waves.

- Billy Bush – engineer
- John Catlin – engineer (mix)
- Joe LaPorta – mastered
- Justin Meldal-Johnsen – producer
- Alan Moulder – mixing
- Thom Powers – producer
- David Schwerkolt – engineer (assistant)

== Charts ==
Chart (2013)	Peak position
Australian Singles Chart	83
US Alternative Songs (Billboard)	26

== Release history ==
Region	Format	Date	Label
Ireland	Digital download	2013	Somewhat Damaged
United Kingdom	Digital download	2013	Somewhat Damaged

== In popular culture ==
It was used in the fourth episode of the fifth season of The CW television series The Vampire Diaries. Hearts Like Ours appears on the soundtrack for EA Sports game, FIFA 14. The song was also used in the season one finale of the MTV television series Happyland.

Hearts Like Ours was also appropriately used as the closing song to the 6-episode documentary series on the imperious New Zealand national rugby team, the All Blacks - All Or Nothing: New Zealand All Blacks.
