= I Kill Giants (song) =

Promotional single by the Naked and Famous

from the album In Rolling Waves
- Released: 13 September 2013
- Genre: Indie rock; synth-pop
- Length: 4:12
- Label: Fiction
- Songwriters: Thom Powers; Aaron Short; Alisa Xayalith
- Producers: Justin Meldal-Johnsen; Thom Powers

"I Kill Giants" is a song by New Zealand band the Naked and Famous, released as a promotional single from their second studio album, In Rolling Waves (2013).

== Premise ==
According to vocalist Alisa Xayalith, the song is about her losing her mother to breast cancer at a very young age, admitting that "[She] felt insecure singing about something so infinitely painful and blatantly autobiographical." The title comes from a comic book of the same name by Joe Kelly.

Though intended for inclusion on debut album Passive Me, Aggressive You, the tune was not finished in time for that album.

== Video ==
The music video, which debuted on the same day, features two women performing theatrical dance in front of a church congregation, and was directed by Joel Kefali.

== Critical reception ==
The song is described by Kyle Ryan of The A.V. Club as being the song that has a large 3 note chorus with staccato synthesizer that lifts the tempo of the album following the tranquil song "Golden Girl". Matt Collar of AllMusic describes the composition as "particularly epic in proportion and cinematic in its emotional momentum".

== Track listing ==
UK promo single

1. "I Kill Giants" (Radio Edit) – 3:39
2. "I Kill Giants" (Instrumental) – 4:12

== Personnel ==
Credits adapted from the liner notes of In Rolling Waves.

- Billy Bush – engineer
- John Catlin – engineer (mix)
- Joe LaPorta – mastered
- Justin Meldal-Johnsen – producer
- Alan Moulder – mixing
- Thom Powers – producer
- David Schwerkolt – engineer (assistant)
