= PMAY =

PMAY may refer to:

- Passive Me, Aggressive You, album by the Naked and Famous
- Pradhan Mantri Awas Yojana, housing subsidy scheme in India
