= For Whom the Bell Tolls (The Vampire Diaries) =

- The Vampire Diaries episode
- Episode no.: Season 5 Episode 4
- Directed by: Michael Allowitz
- Written by: Brett Matthews; Elisabeth R. Finch
- Production code: 2J7504
- Original air date: October 24, 2013

Guest appearances
- Rick Cosnett (Professor Wes Maxfield); Kendrick Sampson (Jesse)

Episode chronology
← Previous "Original Sin"	Next → "Monster's Ball"
- The Vampire Diaries season 5

"For Whom the Bell Tolls" is the fourth episode of the fifth season of the American series The Vampire Diaries, and the series' 93rd episode overall. "For Whom the Bell Tolls" was originally aired on October 24, 2013, on The CW. The episode was written by Brett Matthews and Elisabeth R. Finch and directed by Michael Allowitz.

== Plot ==
After Stefan (Paul Wesley) lost his memory, Damon (Ian Somerhalder) tries to help him remember. He remembers the date and where he is, but he cannot remember who he is, who the people are around him, or even that he is a vampire. Damon presents Stefan with his diaries to jog his memory with, but he still has no recollection of his past.

Elena (Nina Dobrev) meets the two of them later to find out that Damon did not tell Stefan about her yet. Stefan is conquered by his thirst and follows a waitress but Damon gets there in time before he hurts her. After the incident, they take Stefan to the family crypt where there are fewer people around. Damon gets a phone call from Jeremy (Steven R. McQueen) and leaves, leaving Stefan alone with Elena.

Elena tries to help Stefan remember by taking him to the school where they reenact the moment they met. Stefan still cannot remember, so Elena takes him to the bridge where he saved Matt's (Zach Roerig) life and she became a vampire. He does not recall any of the events. The two of them come very close, but before they kiss, Elena tells him that she is with Damon, something that makes Stefan angry and leaves.

Matt experiences episodes of losing time, so he sets up cameras all over the house to discover what is happening. He also calls Jeremy to ask his help since he can't contact Bonnie (Kat Graham). When Jeremy sees how desperate Matt is and that everyone is looking for Bonnie for help, he decides to tell everyone that Bonnie is dead despite her wishes and he calls Damon. Matt later discovers in one of the videos that he has a passenger inside of him who warns him that his friends will come looking for the knife and he has to protect it otherwise they will kill him.

Damon is back to the Salvatore house where Jeremy informs him about Bonnie. Damon tries to tell Elena but stops when she tells him that she has lost Stefan and he decides to help her find him. Stefan is at the Remembrance Day celebration at the cemetery where Caroline (Candice Accola) finds him. Stefan can feel that he can trust her but he attacks Jesse (Kendrick Sampson). Caroline stops him, gives Jesse her blood to heal him and then compels him to forget.

Stefan returns home, burns his journals and packs his things to leave. He is uninterested in continuing to live in the Salvatore home and continue his life as the "old" Stefan. Before he goes, he makes a promise to Damon and Elena that he will not become the Ripper again and that Caroline will be checking up on him. After Stefan's departure, Damon finally tells Elena that Bonnie is dead.

Elena, Damon, Caroline, Matt and Jeremy make a private ceremony for Bonnie in the forest to say their goodbyes. Bonnie is there and she talks to all of them through Jeremy who can see and hear her. While this is happening, Tyler (Michael Trevino) appears and Caroline runs towards him laughing through her tears.

The episode ends with Jesse and Maxfield (Rick Cosnett) who finds evidence of vampire blood in Jesse's system. He explains to him that this might have happened because someone tried to heal him or because someone wanted to make him a vampire. Maxfield guesses that what happened must be the first and he also explains that having vampire blood in your system is the first step to become a vampire. Jesse looks on, confused, as Maxfield says: "And this is the second," while he injects Jesse with a syringe filled with yellow liquid that kills him.

== Featured music ==
In the "For Whom the Bell Tolls" episode we can hear the songs:

- "Without a Word" by Birdy
- "Hearts Like Ours" by The Naked and Famous
- "Longest Night" by Howie Day
- "Happy Faces" by Babe Youth
- "Cards With the Devil" by Von Bonneville
- "I've Got Friends" by Manchester Orchestra
- "Back Against the Wall" by Cage the Elephant
- "Gravity" by Sara Bareilles

== Reception ==
=== Ratings ===
In its original American broadcast, "For Whom the Bell Tolls" was watched by 2.63 million; down 0.30 from the previous episode.

=== Reviews ===
"For Whom the Bell Tolls" received positive reviews.

Leigh Raines of TV Fanatic rated the episode with 4/5 stating that "More than halfway through "For Whom the Bell Tolls" I was moderately bored by this week's The Vampire Diaries. [...] Then Jeremy revealed a secret we've known since The Vampire Diaries Season 4 finale and everything went to pieces."

Nad from Nad's Reviews gave a B+ rate to the episode saying that he enjoyed it and that it was a solid and highly effective hour of The Vampire Diaries. "For the first time in a long time, I actually find myself looking forward to catching up with the gang every week."

Stephanie Flasher of TV After Dark gave an A− rate to the episode saying that it was quite an emotional one. "Overall, it's a pretty good episode. I wish there would have been more development in the Silas story line, but gave Bonnie a true memorial that the character truly deserved, even though she'll still be on the show."

Christopher Monigle of Star Pulse gave a good review to the episode saying that the show "excels at moving farewell scenes" and "The writing’s really, really moving sometimes."

Stephanie Hall of KSiteTV also gave a good review to the episode saying that it didn't fail to entertain. "I hesitate to call "For Whom the Bell Tolls" a filler episode because there were monumental moments moving the greater story forward, but for all intents and purposes it was an episode devised for the sake of season one nostalgia."

Crystal Bell from Wetpaint said that the episode was "a roller coaster of emotions" and "had a little bit of everything." "If there was one blip in this otherwise perfect episode it was Matt's storyline, which frankly, isn't as compelling as we'd like it to be."

Despite the good reviews, Carrie Raisler from The A.V. Club gave the episode a mixed review saying that the episode was all over the place and finally rating it with a C+.
