= This Machine =

This Machine may refer to:

- This Machine (EP), a 2008 EP by the Naked and Famous
- This Machine (album), a 2012 album by the Dandy Warhols
- "This Machine", a 2003 song by Julien-K and Jun Senoue for Sonic Heroes
