= A Stillness =

Song by The Naked and Famous

from the album In Rolling Waves
- Released: 13 September 2013
- Genre: Indie rock, synthpop, neo-psychedelia
- Length: 5:22
- Label: Fiction; Island
- Songwriters: Thom Powers; Aaron Short; Alisa Xayalith
- Producers: Powers; Short

"A Stillness" is a song by New Zealand post-punk revival band The Naked and Famous, from their second studio album In Rolling Waves. The song was released for streaming on 28 August 2013.

== Premise ==
The song is about getting ahead of worry and psychoanalysis, re-encountering love, stability, safety, tranquility, not straying and combatting the sense of despair that a person may have.

== Live performances ==
Following the release of the album, the song has been used as the first tune performed at live shows.

== Critical reception ==
EastScene describes the song as one having a galaxial theme of discovery while nonetheless remaining grounded, as the keyboards and percussion instruments stray in opposing paths while veering along the same trail. Christopher Sheridan of Band Wagon Magazine describes the song as starting off slowly while rising up gradually and setting the tone for the momentum the band is known for, with Lauren Brown from Rock on Philly comparing lead vocalist Alisa Xayalith's resonant vocals to those of Yeah Yeah Yeahs front woman Karen Orzolek. Brown went on to say that the song did not portray the ensemble's electropop talent.

== Personnel ==
Credits adapted from the liner notes of In Rolling Waves.

- Billy Bush – engineer
- John Catlin – engineer (mix)
- Joe LaPorta – mastered
- Alan Moulder – mixing
- Thom Powers – producer
- David Schwerkolt – engineer (assistant)
