= Recover (The Naked and Famous album) =

Studio album by The Naked and Famous
- Released: 24 July 2020
- Genre: Electropop
- Length: 49:05
- Label: Somewhat Damaged; AWAL
- Producer: Sam McCarthy; Simon Oscroft; Thomas Powers; Luna Shadows; Ryan Shanahan; Tyler Spry; Alisa Xayalith

The Naked and Famous chronology
Simple Forms (2016)	Recover (2020)

Singles from Recover
- 1. "Sunseeker" Released: 8 November 2019; 2. "Bury Us" Released: 16 January 2020; 3. "Come as You Are" Released: 26 February 2020; 4. "Death" Released: 22 May 2020; 5. "Recover" Released: 24 July 2020

Recover is the fourth studio album by New Zealand indie electronic band The Naked and Famous, and the first album since the band reorganized as a duo, released on 24 July 2020 by Somewhat Damaged and AWAL.

== Background ==
"Sunseeker" was released on 8 November 2019 as the lead single from the band's then-upcoming fourth album, along with an accompanying music video. Shore Fire Media stated that the two band members, Thomas Powers and Alisa Xayalith, "embrace transformation whilst remaining authentically true to form on the new single".

On 16 January 2020, "Bury Us" was released as the album's second single. Puah Ziwei of NME stated that the song "captures the energy and essence of their forthcoming record". Laura Johnson of Stereoboard referred to the song as "a club-ready indie-pop track with thoughtful lyrics".

"Come as You Are" was released as the album's third single on 26 February 2020, followed by "Death" on 22 May 2020. The title track was serviced to Australian radio on 24 July 2020 as the fifth single.

== Critical reception ==
Professional ratings
Review scores
Source	Rating
AllMusic	4/5 stars

Heran Mamo of Billboard stated that the album has a "main theme of human survival and self-preservation, especially at the hands of another person who could bring you down". Matt Collar of AllMusic described the music as "turning feelings of heartbreak and desire into powerfully relatable pop moments".

== Track listing ==
No.	Title	Writer(s)	Producer(s)	Length
1.	"Recover"	Thomas Powers; Alisa Xayalith; Simon Oscroft	Powers; Oscroft	3:04
2.	"Sunseeker"	Powers; Xayalith; Oscroft; Luna Shadows	Powers; Oscroft; Shadows^{[a]}	3:48
3.	"Bury Us"	Powers; Xayalith; Shadows	Powers; Sam McCarthy; Shadows; Oscroft^{[a]}	3:09
4.	"Easy"	Powers; Xayalith; Oscroft	Powers; Oscroft	3:53
5.	"Come as You Are"	Powers; Xayalith; Oscroft	Powers; Oscroft	3:39
6.	"Everybody Knows"	Powers; Xayalith; Oscroft; Dani Poppitt	Powers; Oscroft	3:44
7.	"Echoes in the Dark"	Powers; Xayalith; Bram Inscore	Powers	1:24
8.	"Well-Rehearsed"	Powers; Xayalith; Shadows	Powers; Shadows^{[a]}; Sombear^{[a]}	3:32
9.	"Monument"	Powers; Xayalith; Shadows; Sombear	Powers; Oscroft	3:36
10.	"Death"	Powers; Xayalith; Shadows; Oscroft	Powers; Oscroft	4:00
11.	"Count on You"	Powers; Xayalith; Oscroft	Powers; Oscroft	3:33
12.	"Muscle Memory"	Powers; Xayalith	Powers; Ryan Shanahan	0:41
13.	"The Sound of My Voice"	Powers; Xayalith; McCarthy; Scott Hutchison	Powers; McCarthy	3:42
14.	"(An)aesthetic"	Powers; Xayalith; Oscroft	Powers; Oscroft	3:45
15.	"Coming Back to Me"	Powers; Xayalith; Oscroft	Powers; Oscroft; Xayalith; Tyler Spry	3:35
Total length:				49:05

=== Notes ===
- ^{^[a]} signifies an additional producer

== Personnel ==
Credits adapted from the liner notes of Recover.

=== Performers ===
- Morgxn – backing vocals (track 1)
- Chelsea Jade – backing vocals (track 1)
- Luna Shadows – backing vocals (tracks 1, 11)
- Dani Poppitt – backing vocals (track 6)
- Simon Oscroft – backing vocals (track 6)
- In.Drip. – backing vocals (track 11)

=== Technical ===
- Thom Powers – production (all tracks)
- Simon Oscroft – production (tracks 1, 2, 4–6, 9–11, 14, 15); additional production (track 3)
- Ryan Shanahan – mixing (all tracks); production (track 12)
- Joe LaPorta – mastering (all tracks)
- Luna Shadows – additional production (tracks 2, 8); production (track 3); vocal engineering (tracks 4, 13)
- Sam McCarthy – production (tracks 3, 13)
- Sombear – additional production (track 8)
- Alisa Xayalith – production (track 15)
- Tyler Spry – production (track 15)
- Dave Trumfio – additional engineering, recording (track 15)

== Charts ==
Chart performance for Recover
Chart (2020)	Peak position
New Zealand Artist Albums (RMNZ)	19
UK Album Downloads (OCC)	61
UK Independent Albums (OCC)	41
US Top Album Sales (Billboard)	92
