= Simple Forms (album) =

Studio album by The Naked and Famous
- Released: 14 October 2016
- Recorded: 2015–2016
- Studios: Music Friends (Los Angeles); NRG Recording Studios (North Hollywood, California)
- Length: 40:23
- Label: Somewhat Damaged
- Producers: The Naked and Famous; Thomas Powers; Sombear

The Naked and Famous chronology
In Rolling Waves (2013)	Simple Forms (2016)	A Still Heart (2018)

Singles from Simple Forms
- 1. "Higher" Released: 8 July 2016; 2. "Laid Low" Released: 25 August 2016; 3. "The Runners" Released: 30 September 2016

Simple Forms is the third studio album by New Zealand indie electronic band The Naked and Famous. It was released on 14 October 2016 by Somewhat Damaged in partnership with Kobalt Label Services. "Higher" was released as the album's lead single on 8 July 2016.

== Critical reception ==
Professional ratings
Review scores
Source	Rating
AllMusic	4/5 stars
News.com.au	3/5 stars
Rolling Stone Australia	3.5/4 stars

Matt Collar of AllMusic commented that Simple Forms is "less overtly bombastic than the group's previous work" and "[t]here's a tenderness to the arrangements that feels straightforward and uncluttered", concluding, "Ultimately, if there is a nuanced sophistication to the band's work on Simple Forms, it feels genuine and hard-won."

Jaymz Clements of Rolling Stone Australia wrote, "At times, [...] it feels like the Naked and Famous are playing musical catch-up, as Simple Forms struggles to move beyond place-holder synth-pop like 'Water Beneath You'. But when Xayalith and former partner Thom Powers team up on the sparkling 'My Energy' and 'Last Forever', their taut, dynamic atmosphere shines."

Cyclone Wehner of News.com.au felt that "[t]he trouble is that TNAF [...] tend to work to an anthemic formula. And no songs here are as memorable as the early 'Young Blood'."

== Track listing ==
All tracks are written by The Naked and Famous, except where noted. All tracks produced by The Naked and Famous and Thomas Powers, except where noted.

No.	Title	Length
1.	"Higher" (producers: The Naked and Famous, Powers; additional producer: Sombear)	3:50
2.	"The Water Beneath You"	3:52
3.	"My Energy" (producers: The Naked and Famous, Powers; additional producer: Sombear)	4:00
4.	"Last Forever"	4:13
5.	"Losing Our Control"	3:56
6.	"Backslide"	4:05
7.	"Laid Low" (writers: The Naked and Famous, Kamtin Mohager)	3:55
8.	"The Runners"	4:20
9.	"Falling"	3:51
10.	"Rotten"	4:21
Total length:		40:23

== Personnel ==
Credits adapted from the liner notes of Simple Forms.

The Naked and Famous

- The Naked and Famous – production
- Thomas Powers – production

Additional personnel

- Ken Andrews – mixing
- Carlos de la Garza – live instrumentation engineering
- Joel Kefali – artwork
- Joe LaPorta – mastering
- Sombear – additional production (tracks 1, 3)

== Charts ==
Chart (2016)	Peak position
Australian Albums (ARIA)	37
Canadian Albums (Billboard)	67
New Zealand Albums (RMNZ)	15
UK Independent Albums (Official Charts)	49
US Billboard 200	110
US Independent Albums (Billboard)	9
US Top Alternative Albums (Billboard)	10
US Top Rock Albums (Billboard)	17

== Release history ==
Region	Date	Label	Format	Ref.
New Zealand	14 October 2016	Island	CD; digital download	
Australia	14 October 2016	Island	CD; digital download	
United Kingdom	14 October 2016	Somewhat Damaged	CD; digital download	
United States	14 October 2016	Somewhat Damaged	CD; LP; digital download	
