= Rizz (EP) =

EP by Soojin
- Released: May 23, 2024
- Genres: R&B; dance; rock
- Length: 16:15
- Languages: Korean; English
- Label: BRD

Soojin chronology
Agassy (2023)	Rizz (2024)	Baditude (2025)

Singles from Rizz
- 1. "Mona Lisa" Released: May 23, 2024

Rizz is the second extended play by South Korean singer Soojin. It was released by BRD Communications on May 23, 2024, and contains six tracks, including the lead single, "Mona Lisa".

== Background ==
On April 18, 2024, it was revealed that Soojin would be releasing her new album in May. On April 29, it was announced that the singer's second extended play, titled Rizz, would be released on May 23, 2024. On May 2, the track listing was unveiled with "Mona Lisa" announced as the lead single. A highlight medley featuring snippets of the songs was released on May 20. Teasers for the music video for "Mona Lisa" were released on May 21 and 22.

== Aesthetics and influences ==
The visuals and themes of Rizz draw inspiration from Leonardo da Vinci's Mona Lisa.

The album's visuals are inspired by Leonardo da Vinci's popular portrait painting Mona Lisa. In concept photos, Soojin is seen wearing "skin-colored mini dress, long black hair, and nude makeup" to create "chic and alluring atmosphere". The photos portray the singer as the Mona Lisa, in front of a background reminiscent of the Vinci's portrait.

The Delicate version of the concept photos features "trendy gore, punk style and purple core makeup". The visuals picture Soojin "lying on a platform" and "spreading metal wings" against "a dark, and cold background". The Wild version shows Soojin wearing a "leopard print dress and leather styling" among "lush greenery".

== Conception ==
Following the album announcement, BRD shared that it will "showcase a different side of Soojin while maintaining her unique allure". Regarding the EP's theme, BRD Communications stated that "much like the album's title, which means 'an ability to charm people', Soojin will woo her fans with multifaceted charms that are sometimes intense, other times loving".

== Composition ==
The standard edition of Rizz consists of six tracks and incorporates various genres such as R&B, dance and rock.

=== Songs ===
The first track, "Rizz Me Up", is a tempo-driven UK garage and alternative rock number about "expressing attraction to another" with "just the look of one's eyes without saying a word". The second track and lead single, "Mona Lisa", is a "mysterious-sounding" song featuring electric guitars and synths over a "bouncy" Afrobeats rhythm. Lyrically, it captures "the desire to captivate other with a 'subtle gaze and charm' like the Mona Lisa". The third song, "Lime", was described as a "refreshing and lovely" tune that "compares the moment we fall in love to a lime". The fourth track, "Tide", is a pop and R&B song with "an attractive soft textured keyboard sound". The fifth song, "Drop Top", features Soojin's "sensuous" vocals" over "an attractive funky rhythm and a retro synthesizer". The sixth song, "Summer Daze", is sung fully in English and expresses the theme "My memories of you lead me back to you".

== Promotion ==
On May 19, 2024, Soojin held an event where she played new music to her fans ahead of the album's release. The singer also performed "Mona Lisa" for the first time. The singer made her music show debut on MBC M's Show Champion on May 29 to perform the single.

=== Summer Daze ===
On June 1, 2024 Soojin released a poster for her Summer Daze fan concert tour in Asia. The tour began on July 15, 2024, at the Hokutopia Sakura Hall in Tokyo, Japan.

== Track listing ==
Rizz track listing
No.	Title	Lyrics	Music	Arrangement	Length
1.	"Rizz Me Up"	Suen (수엔); Rhode	Suen; Rhode; Yuth	Yuth	2:16
2.	"Mona Lisa"	Mok Ji Min (목지민); Woo Seung Yeon (우승연)	Rhode; Puff (퍼프)	Rhode; Puff	2:40
3.	"Lime"	Bay (153/Joombas)	Anton Hård af Segerstad; Owza; Maya Rose	Hård af Segerstad	2:47
4.	"Tide" (헤엄)	Suen	Rhode; Suen	Rhode	2:48
5.	"Drop Top"	Rhode; Suen	Suen; Rhode; Yuth	Yuth	2:36
6.	"Summer Daze"	Jessica Pierpoint	Jessica Pierpoint; Yuth	Yuth	3:08
Total length:					16:15

== Charts ==
=== Weekly charts ===
Weekly chart performance for Rizz
Chart (2024)	Peak position
South Korean Albums (Circle)	7

=== Monthly charts ===
Monthly chart performance for Rizz
Chart (2024)	Position
South Korean Albums (Circle)	19

== Release history ==
Release history and formats for Rizz
Region	Date	Format	Label
South Korea	May 23, 2024	CD	BRD
Various	May 23, 2024	Digital download; streaming	BRD
