= Agassy =

EP by Soojin
- Released: November 8, 2023
- Genres: Dance; R&B; K-ballad
- Length: 14:44
- Language: Korean
- Label: BRD

Soojin chronology
Agassy (2023)	Rizz (2024)

Singles from Agassy
- 1. "Agassy" Released: November 8, 2023

Agassy (Korean: 아가씨; RR: Agassi; lit. '"young lady"') is the debut extended play by South Korean singer Soojin. It was released by BRD Communications on November 8, 2023. The EP contains six tracks, including the lead single of the same name. Soojin conceived Agassy as "a whole new blend" of the singer's qualities, featuring "a more mature scent" and combining various genres.

Commercially, it peaked at number seven on the Circle Chart. To promote the EP, Soojin embarked on the Flowering tour in February 2024.

== Background and release ==
On March 4, 2021, Cube Entertainment announced that Soojin, then member of the South Korean girl group (G)I-dle, would temporarily halt all activities due to bullying allegations by former classmates, that were later found to be false. In August 2021, the singer had officially withdrawn from the group and label. Following the news, Soojin "remained largely out of the public eye". On June 30, 2023, almost 2 years after her departure from the group, Soojin opened up a personal Instagram account, hinting at a possible return to the entertainment industry.

On October 16, it was reported that the singer had signed an exclusive contract with the record label BRD Communications. This was followed by a statement that Soojin was "quietly preparing to make a solo comeback". A "monochrome" dance performance video, titled "Black Forest", was released on October 25. It features the singer performing a "contemporary dance to dramatic instrumental music, before she is joined by two masked backup dancers in the second half". On October 26, BRD announced that the singer would be releasing her debut extended play, titled Agassy, on November 8. On November 1, the track listing for the EP was released with the title track announced as the lead single. On November 3, a highlight medley featuring snippets of the six tracks was published. Teasers for the music video for the title track were released on November 6 and 7. On November 8, 2023, Agassy was released along with the music video for its title track.

=== Aesthetics ===
On October 26, Soojin released a concept trailer for the extended play. In the video, she is seen wearing traditional Korean clothing, such as a hanbok dress and binyeo. Nayoung Kim of MK Sports noted that singer shows a "limitless ability to digest concepts" and "ever-changing facial expressions and mature charm" in the concept photos. Jeon Jae-kyung of Newsis praised the way Soojin "create[s] various moods" from "charming and chic" to "innocent and lovely".

== Development ==
"Because this is an album where I can show my true self from beginning to end, I thought every part was important, but I especially thought the lyrics were important. The songs I thought were good always centered around relatable lyrics. Also, when I listen to a song for the first time or am interested in it, I listen to it while looking at the lyrics. This habit is also reflected in this album, and I think it would be good if you listen to my album by paying attention to the lyrics".

— Soojin looking back on making Agassy, Xport News.

In an interview with Xport News, Soojin stated that Agassy is "a whole new blend of [her] [qualities] - both pure and enchanting, as well as charismatic and mysterious". Furthermore, she added: "Before, I have shown rather charismatic and strong sides of myself, but this time, I decided to reveal a different side of myself. I hope that my fans and audiences will be able to enjoy a completely different version of me".

The singer described the fifth track, "Sunset", as the one "[she is] most attached to" since it "allowed [her] to imagine the journey of meeting fans in a delightful way" when she heard it for the first time.

== Composition ==
The standard edition of Agassy consists of six tracks and incorporates various genres such as dance, R&B and K-ballad. Described as "a new beginning for Soojin", the extended play solidifies the singer's position as a solo artist by showing off her "unique strengths" and "unrivaled musical color" that contains "a more mature scent". The tracks on the extended play were written and composed by a variety of songwriter-producers: Yuth, Rhode, Suen, Kim Chae Ah, Flip_00, Ellui, Josh Grant and Alisa Xayalith, among others.

=== Songs ===
The opening song, "Flowering", lyrically depicts "flowers blooming in warm sunlight". Its melody consists of a guitar and strings, which evoke "a languid yet strange sense of tension". The title track is characterized by oriental sound instruments and combines Soojin's "unique color with the strange feeling of crossing the past and present". The third song, "Sunflower", expresses the experience of "falling head first in love" and "developing deep emotions for someone", comparing it to "a sunflower blooming within [the singer]". "TyTy" is a "bright" and "catchy" track that shows "gratitude" to a person who protects the singer "without saying a word" and "no matter what happens". Musically, the song is built around "twinkling synths skip" in the hook and features a "wispy, layered falsettos" in the vocal delivery. Followed by "Sunset", a "hazy" R&B track that is sung in "an alto register" over a bossanova rhythm. It features "poetic" lyrics about "watching the sun set beneath the horizon". The sixth track, "Bloodredroses", is a "melancholic note" that expresses the pain of the dissolution of a romantic relationship. Eventually, Soojin "acknowledg[es] the trials and tribulations" she had to face and "finds the space to accept that she has grown because and in spite of them".

== Critical reception ==
Professional ratings
Review scores
Source	Rating
NME	4/5 stars

Carmen Chin writing for NME described the extended play as "a captivating love letter to herself" and "a testament to her strength in returning to what does best". She concluded that "even if [Agassy] tends to play it safe with run-of-the-mill production - underscores the potential Soojin has always held and puts it on display for the world to see once again".

== Promotion ==
On November 10, 2023, it was announced that Soojin would "focus on her overseas activities rather than the domestic ones". The singer opted for hosting fan signing events and communicating with fans via social media. On November 20, Soojin performed the title track at the Naver's Playlist NPOP. On December 13 and 14, the singer held her first fan meet and greet at the Cutup Studio in Tower Records Shibuya, Japan.

=== Tour ===
On December 6, the singer announced that she would embark on the Flowering tour across Oceania, in February, 2024. The tour began on February 11, 2024, at the Great Hall in Auckland, New Zealand.

==== Setlist ====
1. Black Forest (Dance performance)
2. Agassy
3. bloodredroses
4. But I Am A Good Girl (Christina Aguilera song) (Dance performance)
5. Sunset

===== Encore =====
1. TyTy
2. Sunflower

== Commercial performance ==
Agassy debuted at number eight on the Circle Album Chart with 66,463 sold in less than five days of tracking. On the chart issued December 3–9, 2023, the EP reached a new peak at number seven. On December 13, the EP exceeded 100,000 copies sold on the Hanteo Chart.

== Track listing ==
Agassy track listing
No.	Title	Lyrics	Music	Arrangement	Length
1.	"Flowering" (개화; 開花; Gaehwa)	Yuth	Rhode	Rhode	1:03
2.	"Agassy" (아가씨; Agassi)	Kang Eun Jeong (강은정); Mok Ji Min (목지민)	Yuth; Puff (퍼프)	Yuth; Puff (퍼프)	2:45
3.	"Sunflower"	Suen (수엔); Rhode; Kim Chae Ah (김채아)	Suen (수엔); Rhode	Rhode	2:50
4.	"TyTy"	Suen (수엔); Rhode	Suen (수엔); Rhode; Yuth	Yuth	2:32
5.	"Sunset"	Kim Chae Ah (김채아); Flip_00; Ellui	Flip_00; Ellui; 37	Flip_00; 37	2:45
6.	"Bloodredroses"	Choi Min Ji (최민지)	Josh Grant; Alisa Xayalith	Grant	2:47
Total length:					14:44

== Charts ==
=== Weekly charts ===
Weekly chart performance for Agassy
Chart (2023)	Peak position
South Korean Albums (Circle)	7

=== Monthly charts ===
Monthly chart performance for Agassy
Chart (2023)	Position
South Korean Albums (Circle)	18

== Sale figures ==
Sales certifications and figures for Agassy
Region	Certification	Certified units/sales
South Korea	—	100,000

== Release history ==
Release history and formats for Agassy
Region	Date	Format	Label
South Korea	November 8, 2023	CD	BRD
Various	November 8, 2023	Digital download; streaming	BRD
