= Music and Audio Institute of New Zealand =

New Zealand music education institute

Music and Audio Institute of New Zealand - MAINZ
- Type: Tertiary Education Institution
- Established: 1990 Tai Poutini Polytechnic
- Parent institution: Ara Institute of Canterbury
- Location: Christchurch, New Zealand; 43.5370°S 172.6429°E
- Campus: Urban
- Website: www.ara.ac.nz/study-interest-areas/music/mainz/

Music and Audio Institute of New Zealand (MAINZ) is part of Ara Institute of Canterbury, focused on contemporary music and music-industry related education. MAINZ was previously operated by Southern Institute of Technology (SIT) until 2025.

MAINZ alumni include Joel Little, Josh Fountain, Troy Kingi, Karen Hunter, Gin Wigmore, Zowie, members of the Checks, Concord Dawn, Goldenhorse, Jen Valender, Goodnight Nurse, Midnight Youth, the Mint Chicks, The Naked and Famous and 8 Foot Sativa. MAINZ tutors have included New Zealand music luminaries Harry Lyon and Dave McCartney.

The MAINZ Auckland campus was closed down in 2023 by Te Pukenga. Ex-MAINZ staff in Auckland now own a Private Training Establishment registered with NZQA (4420) in 2025 called "Let's Go".

== History ==
=== Established in Greymouth ===
Tai Poutini Polytechnic in Greymouth first offered a Certificate in Contemporary Music programme when the institute was established in 1990. In 1992 the Certificate in Audio Engineering and Music Production was introduced, and a purpose-built sound and recording studio was constructed at the Greymouth campus. This programme was followed by a Certificate in Live Sound and Event Production which commenced in 1994.That same year (1994) a Certificate in Audio Engineering was offered in Auckland and temporary premises were leased in Queen Street.The Diploma of Audio Engineering and Music Production was added at the Auckland Campus at 11-13 Waverley street in 1995, using York Street Studio 'A' in Parnell for studio practicals. In 1996 Certificates in Contemporary Music and Live Sound and Event Production were offered in Auckland, originally using Waverley Street for theory and what is now the Basement Theatre for practicals. From 1996 the Certificate and Diploma in Audio Engineering and Music Production ran on the seventh floor of the LJ Hooker building (formerly AETNA house) on Symonds Street, Auckland.

Live Sound (Special Event) and Contemporary Music programmes moved to the Manukau Institute of Technology Campus in 1997.

For a number of years the Certificate in Audio Engineering and Certificate in Contemporary Music were offered at Auckland and Greymouth campuses simultaneously.

=== Established in Christchurch and Auckland ===
In 1998, the entire suite of Music and Audio programmes was relocated to Auckland.

In 2001 all the teaching was consolidated on the former premises, Rainger House, at 150 Victoria Street West, Auckland. The new Auckland campus was opened by Prime Minister Helen Clark. During 2001, audio engineering programmes were offered for the first time in Christchurch.

A suitable building at 191 High Street in the Christchurch CBD was leased and outfitted ready for the start of 2002. Initially the Certificate in Audio Engineering Level 5 was offered, and the Diploma of Audio Engineering Level 6 was added in 2003. The MAINZ Certificate in Live Sound and Event Production Level 4 was offered from 2004.

After experiencing high demand for its DJ short courses, MAINZ began offering a Level 4 Certificate in DJ and Electronic Music Production programme from its Auckland campus in 2010. The 1-year full-time programme was led by award-winning Detroit DJ and producer Recloose and offered training in electronic music production, performance and DJing techniques. Cert DJEMP's success in Auckland led to the programme being offered from MAINZ's Christchurch campus beginning in February 2014. Since 2014, delivery of DJEMP at the MAINZ Auckland campus has been led by DJ, producer and Ableton Live Certified trainer Chris Cox aka Frank Booker. A level 5 Diploma was introduced in 2018.

SIT and Te Pukenga closed the Auckland campus after sustaining damage from flooding. Ex-MAINZ staff in Auckland have formed a private training establishment registered with NZQA (4420) trading as Lets Go.

=== Transfer to Southern Institute of Technology ===
On 31 January 2018 the MAINZ faculty transferred from Tai Poutini Polytechnic to Southern Institute of Technology.

MAINZ moved to 15 Canning Crescent, Māngere, where MAINZ was housed within the Te Wānanga o Aotearoa building. This was damaged in Auckland floods and was closed by Te Pukenga in 2023.

=== Transfer to Ara Institute of Canterbury ===
On 1 January 2026, MAINZ and its programmes will transfer from Southern Institute of Technology to Ara Institute of Canterbury. MAINZ programmes will be taught alongside the Bachelor of Music in shared facilities at 130 High Street, Christchurch.

As of 2026, MAINZ at Ara offers the following qualifications:

- New Zealand Certificate in DJ and Electronic Music Production (Level 4)
- New Zealand Diploma in Audio Engineering and Production (Level 5)
- New Zealand Diploma in Audio Engineering and Production (Level 6)

== Awards ==
Alumni from MAINZ have won over 60 music awards, including Grammy Awards, VNZMA's and APRA Silver Scrolls.

Year	Ceremony	Performing Artist	Category	Recording	MAINZ Alumni/Staff Nominated	MAINZ Alumni Role	Nominated / Won
2020	Aotearoa Music Awards	Lee Mvtthews	Electronic	Bones Album	Tom Lee & Graham Matthews	Artist, writer, producer	Won
2019	APRA Silver Scroll Awards	Benee	Silver Scroll	"Soaked"	Josh Fountain	Co-writer	Nominated
2019	APRA Song Awards	Kings	Best Pacific Song	"Six Figures"	Kings	Artist, writer, producer	Won
2019	NZ Music Awards	Kings	Pacific	Love & Ego	Kings	Artist, writer, producer	Won
2019	NZ Music Awards	Broods	Album of the Year	Don't Feed the Pop Monster	Joel Little	Co-writer, producer	Nominated
2019	NZ Music Awards	Broods	Group	Don't Feed the Pop Monster	Joel Little	Co-writer, producer	Nominated
2019	NZ Music Awards	Broods	Pop	Don't Feed the Pop Monster	Joel Little	Co-writer, producer	Nominated
2019	NZ Music Awards	Troy Kingi & The Upperclass	Roots	Holy Colony Burning Acres	Troy Kingi	Artist, writer	Nominated
2019	NZ Music Awards	Troy Kingi & The Upperclass	Māori	Holy Colony Burning Acres	Troy Kingi	Artist, writer	Nominated
2019	NZ Music Awards	"various"	Best Producer	"various"	Josh Fountain	Producer	Nominated
2019	NZ Music Awards	"various"	Best Engineer	"various"	Josh Fountain	Engineer	Nominated
2018	NZ Music Awards	Neil Finn	Best Engineer	"Out of Silence"	Jordan Stone	Engineer	Won
2018	NZ Music Awards	Troy Kingi	Māori		Troy Kingi	Artist, writer	Won
2018	NZ Music Awards	Troy Kingi	Soul/RnB		Troy Kingi	Artist, writer	Won
2018	NZ Music Awards	Kings	Hip Hop		Kings	Artist, writer, producer	Nominated
2017	NZ Music Awards	Kings	Radio Airplay	"Don't Worry Bout It"	Kings	Artist, writer, producer	Won
2017	NZ Music Awards	Kings	Highest Selling Single	Don't Worry Bout It	Kings	Artist, writer, producer	Won
2017	NZ Music Awards	Leisure	Best Producer	LEISURE	Josh Fountain	Producer, co-writer	Won
2017	APRA Silver Scroll Awards	Lorde	Silver Scroll	"Green Light"	Joel Little	Co-writer	Won
2017	NZ Music Awards	Lorde	Single of the Year	"Green Light"	Joel Little	Co-writer	Won
2017	NZ Music Awards	Lorde	Album of the Year	Melodrama	Joel Little	Co-writer, producer	Won
2017	NZ Music Awards	Lorde	Pop	Melodrama	Joel Little	Co-writer, producer	Won
2017	NZ Music Awards	Broods	Radio Airplay	"Heartlines"	Joel Little	Co-writer, producer	Nominated
2017	NZ Music Awards	Kings	Pacific	Kings	Kings	Artist, writer, producer	Nominated
2017	NZ Music Awards	Kings	Hip Hop	Kings EP	Kings	Artist, writer, producer	Nominated
2017	NZ Music Awards	Leisure	Album of the Year	LEISURE	Josh Fountain	Producer, co-writer	Nominated
2017	NZ Music Awards	Leisure	Group	LEISURE	Josh Fountain	Artist, co-writer, producer	Nominated
2017	NZ Music Awards	Lorde	Highest Selling Single	"Green Light"	Joel Little	Co-writer	Nominated
2017	NZ Music Awards	Lorde	Radio Airplay	"Green Light"	Joel Little	Co-writer	Nominated
2017	NZ Music Awards	Lorde	Highest Selling Album	Melodrama	Joel Little	Co-writer, producer	Nominated
2016	NZ Music Awards	Broods	Best Engineer	"Conscious"	Joel Little	Engineer, co-writer, producer	Won
2016	NZ Music Awards	Broods	Single of the Year	"Free"	Joel Little	Engineer, co-writer, producer	Won
2016	NZ Music Awards	Broods	Album of the Year	Conscious	Joel Little	Engineer, co-writer, producer	Won
2016	NZ Music Awards	Broods	Best Producer	Conscious	Joel Little	Producer, co-writer	Won
2016	NZ Music Awards	Broods	Pop	Conscious	Joel Little	Co-writer, producer	Won
2016	NZ Music Awards	Kings	Breakthrough Artist	Don't Worry Bout It	Kings	Artist, writer, producer	Won
2016	NZ Music Awards	Broods	Highest Selling Single	"Free"	Joel Little	Co-writer, producer	Nominated
2016	NZ Music Awards	Broods	Radio Airplay	"Free"	Joel Little	Co-writer, producer	Nominated
2016	NZ Music Awards	Gin Wigmore	Highest Selling Album	Blood to Bone	Gin Wigmore	Artist, writer	Nominated
2016	NZ Music Awards	Kings	Single of the Year	"Don't Worry Bout It"	Kings	Artist, writer, producer	Nominated
2016	NZ Music Awards	Kings	People's Choice		Kings	Artist, writer, producer	Nominated
2016	NZ Music Awards	Leisure	Breakthrough Artist	All Over You	Josh Fountain	Artist, co-writer, producer	Nominated
2016	NZ Music Awards	MAALA	Best Producer	Composure	Josh Fountain	Producer	Nominated
2016	NZ Music Awards	MAALA	Pop	Composure	Josh Fountain	Producer	Nominated
2016	NZ Music Awards	The Naked and Famous	Single of the Year	"Higher"	Aaron Short, Alisa Xayalith, Thom Powers	Artists, co-writers, producers	Nominated
2015	APRA Song Awards	Smashproof ft. Pieter T	APRA Best Pacific Song	Survivors	Deach, Josh Fountain	Artist, co-writers	Won
2015	NZ Music Awards	Broods	Radio Airplay	"Mother & Father"	Joel Little	Co-writer, producer	Won
2015	NZ Music Awards	Broods	Album of the Year	Evergreen	Joel Little	Co-writer, producer	Won
2015	NZ Music Awards	Broods	Pop	Evergreen	Joel Little	Co-writer, producer	Won
2015	NZ Music Awards	Lorde	Single of the Year	"Yellow Flicker Beat"	Joel Little	Co-writer, producer	Won
2015	APRA Silver Scroll Awards	Stan Walker, Vince Harder, Troy Kingi	APRA Maioha Award	Aotearoa	Troy Kingi	Artist, writer	Won
2015	NZ Music Awards	Broods	Radio Airplay	"L.A.F"	Joel Little	Co-writer, producer	Nominated
2015	NZ Music Awards	Broods	Highest Selling Single	"Mother & Father"	Joel Little	Co-writer, producer	Nominated
2015	NZ Music Awards	Broods	Best Producer	Evergreen	Joel Little	Producer, co-writer	Nominated
2015	NZ Music Awards	Broods	Highest Selling Album	Evergreen	Joel Little	Co-writer, producer	Nominated
2015	NZ Music Awards	Lorde	Highest Selling Single	"Yellow Flicker Beat"	Joel Little	Co-writer, producer	Nominated
2015	NZ Music Awards	Lorde	Highest Selling Album	Pure Heroine	Joel Little	Co-writer, producer	Nominated
2015	NZ Music Awards	Lorde	Highest Selling Album	Pure Heroine	Joel Little	Co-writer, producer	Nominated
2015	NZ Music Awards	Lorde	Highest Selling Album	The Love Club EP	Joel Little	Co-writer, producer	Nominated
2015	NZ Music Awards	She's So Rad	Alternative	Tango	Anji Sami	Artist, co-writer	Nominated
2015	NZ Music Awards	Shihad	Best Engineer	FVEY	Evan Short	Engineer	Nominated
2014	NZ Music Awards	Lorde	Highest Selling Single	"Royals"	Joel Little	Co-writer, producer	Won
2014	NZ Music Awards	Lorde	Single of the Year	"Team"	Joel Little	Co-writer, producer	Won
2014	NZ Music Awards	Lorde	Album of the Year	Pure Heroine	Joel Little	Co-writer, producer	Won
2014	NZ Music Awards	Lorde	Best Engineer	Pure Heroine	Joel Little	Engineer, co-writer, producer	Won
2014	NZ Music Awards	Lorde	Best Producer	Pure Heroine	Joel Little	Producer, co-writer	Won
2014	NZ Music Awards	Lorde	Pop	Pure Heroine	Joel Little	Co-writer, producer	Won
2014	NZ Music Awards	The Naked and Famous	Group	In Rolling Waves	Aaron Short, Alisa Xayalith, Thom Powers	Artists, co-writers, producers	Won
2014	NZ Music Awards	Broods	Single of the Year	"Bridges"	Joel Little	Co-writer, producer	Nominated
2014	NZ Music Awards	Lorde	Highest Selling Single	"Team"	Joel Little	Co-writer, producer	Nominated
2014	NZ Music Awards	Lorde	Radio Airplay	"Team"	Joel Little	Co-writer, producer	Nominated
2014	NZ Music Awards	Lorde	Highest Selling Single	"Tennis Court"	Joel Little	Co-writer, producer	Nominated
2014	NZ Music Awards	The Naked and Famous	Single of the Year	"Hearts Like Ours"	Aaron Short, Alisa Xayalith, Thom Powers	Artists, co-writers, producers	Nominated
2014	NZ Music Awards	The Naked and Famous	Album of the Year	In Rolling Waves	Aaron Short, Alisa Xayalith, Thom Powers	Artists, co-writers, producers	Nominated
2014	NZ Music Awards	The Naked and Famous	Best Producer	In Rolling Waves	Thom Powers	Artist, producer, co-writer	Nominated
2013	APRA Song Awards	Aaradhna	Best Pacific Song	"Wake Up"	Evan Short	Co-writer, producer	Won
2013	NZ Music Awards	Aaradhna	Album of the Year	Treble & Reverb	Evan Short	Co-writer, producer	Won
2013	NZ Music Awards	Aaradhna	Pacific	Treble & Reverb	Evan Short	Co-writer, producer	Won
2013	APRA Silver Scroll Awards	Lorde	Silver Scroll	"Royals"	Joel Little	Co-writer, producer	Won
2013	NZ Music Awards	Lorde	Single of the Year	"Royals"	Joel Little	Co-writer, producer	Won
2013	Recording Academy Grammy Awards	Lorde	Song of the Year	"Royals"	Joel Little	Co-writer, producer	Won
2013	NZ Music Awards	Lorde	Highest Selling Single	"Royals"	Joel Little	Co-writer, producer	Nominated
2013	Recording Academy Grammy Awards	Lorde	Record of the Year	"Royals"	Joel Little	Co-writer, producer	Nominated
2013	Recording Academy Grammy Awards	Miguel	Best Urban Contemporary Album	Kaleidoscope Dream	Lance Powell	Assistant engineer	Nominated
2012	NZ Music Awards	Concord Dawn	Electronic	Air Chrysalis	Evan Short	Artist, co-writer, producer	Won
2012	NZ Music Awards	The Checks	Rock	Deadly Summer Sway	Karel Chabera Jr.	Artist, bass	Won
2012	NZ Music Awards	The Naked and Famous	International Achievement		Aaron Short, Alisa Xayalith, Thom Powers	Artists, co-writers, producers	Won
2012	NZ Music Awards	Gin Wigmore	Single of the Year	"Black Sheep"	Gin Wigmore	Artist, writer	Nominated
2012	NZ Music Awards	Gin Wigmore	Highest Selling Album	Gravel & Wine	Gin Wigmore	Artist, writer	Nominated
2012	NZ Music Awards	Gin Wigmore	Pop	Gravel & Wine	Gin Wigmore	Artist, writer	Nominated
2012	NZ Music Awards	Gin Wigmore	People's Choice		Gin Wigmore	Artist, writer	Nominated
2012	NZ Music Awards	Mel Parsons	Folk	Red Blue Grey	Mel Parsons	Artist, writer	Nominated
2011	NZ Music Awards	The Naked and Famous	Album of the Year	Passive Me, Aggressive You	Aaron Short, Alisa Xayalith, Thom Powers	Artists, co-writers, producers	Won
2011	NZ Music Awards	The Naked and Famous	Alternative	Passive Me, Aggressive You	Aaron Short, Alisa Xayalith, Thom Powers	Artists, co-writers, producers	Won
2011	NZ Music Awards	The Naked and Famous	Best Engineer	Passive Me, Aggressive You	Aaron Short, Thom Powers	Engineers, artists, writers, producers	Won
2011	NZ Music Awards	The Naked and Famous	Best Producer	Passive Me, Aggressive You	Aaron Short, Thom Powers	Engineers, artists, writers, producers	Won
2011	NZ Music Awards	The Naked and Famous	Breakthrough Artist	Passive Me, Aggressive You	Aaron Short, Alisa Xayalith, Thom Powers	Artists, co-writers, producers	Won
2011	NZ Music Awards	The Naked and Famous	Group	Passive Me, Aggressive You	Aaron Short, Alisa Xayalith, Thom Powers	Artists, co-writers, producers	Won
2011	NZ Music Awards	Concord Dawn	Electronic	The Enemy Within	Evan Short	Artist, co-writer, producer	Nominated
2011	NZ Music Awards	Kids of 88	Pop	Sugarpills	Joel Little	Co-writer, producer	Nominated
2011	NZ Music Awards	The Naked and Famous	People's Choice		Aaron Short, Alisa Xayalith, Thom Powers	Artists, co-writers, producers	Nominated
2010	NZ Music Awards	Gin Wigmore	Album of the Year	Holy Smoke	Gin Wigmore	Artist, writer	Won
2010	NZ Music Awards	Gin Wigmore	Breakthrough Artist	Holy Smoke	Gin Wigmore	Artist, writer	Won
2010	NZ Music Awards	Gin Wigmore	Highest Selling Album	Holy Smoke	Gin Wigmore	Artist, writer	Won
2010	NZ Music Awards	Gin Wigmore	Pop	Holy Smoke	Gin Wigmore	Artist, writer	Won
2010	NZ Music Awards	Kids of 88	Single of the Year	"Just A Liitle Bit"	Joel Little	Co-writer, producer	Won
2010	NZ Music Awards	The Checks	Rock	Alice By The Moon	Karel Chabera Jr.	Artist, bass	Won
2010	APRA Silver Scroll Awards	The Naked and Famous	Silver Scroll	Young Blood	Aaron Short, Alisa Xayalith, Thom Powers	Artists, co-writers, producers	Won
2010	NZ Music Awards	Dane Rumble	Album of the Year	The Experiment	Joel Little	Co-writer	Nominated
2010	NZ Music Awards	Dane Rumble	Pop	The Experiment	Joel Little	Co-writer	Nominated
2010	NZ Music Awards	Gin Wigmore	Single of the Year	"Oh My"	Gin Wigmore	Artist, writer	Nominated
2010	NZ Music Awards	Gin Wigmore	People's Choice		Gin Wigmore	Artist, writer	Nominated
2010	NZ Music Awards	Mel Parsons	Folk	Over My Shoulder	Mel Parsons	Artist, writer	Nominated
2010	NZ Music Awards	The Checks	Group	Alice By The Moon	Karel Chabera Jr.	Artist, bass	Nominated
2009	NZ Music Awards	Midnight Youth	Group	The Brave Don't Run	Matt Warman, Aidan Bartlett	Artists, bass, drums	Won
2009	NZ Music Awards	Midnight Youth	Rock	The Brave Don't Run	Matt Warman, Aidan Bartlett	Artists, bass, drums	Won
2009	NZ Music Awards	Smashproof	People's Choice		Deach	Artist, writer	Won
2009	NZ Music Awards	Smashproof ft. Gin Wigmore	Highest Selling Single	"Brother"	Deach, Gin Wigmore	Co-writer, featured vocal	Won
2009	NZ Music Awards	Kids of 88	Single of the Year	"My House"	Joel Little	Co-writer, producer	Nominated
2009	NZ Music Awards	Midnight Youth	Single of the Year	"All On Our Own"	Matt Warman, Aidan Bartlett	Artists, bass, drums	Nominated
2009	NZ Music Awards	Midnight Youth	Radio Airplay	"The Letter"	Matt Warman, Aidan Bartlett	Artists, bass, drums	Nominated
2009	NZ Music Awards	Midnight Youth	Album of the Year	The Brave Don't Run	Matt Warman, Aidan Bartlett	Artists, bass, drums	Nominated
2009	NZ Music Awards	Midnight Youth	Breakthrough Artist	The Brave Don't Run	Matt Warman, Aidan Bartlett	Artists, bass, drums	Nominated
2009	NZ Music Awards	Midnight Youth	People's Choice		Matt Warman, Aidan Bartlett	Artists, bass, drums	Nominated
2009	NZ Music Awards	Smashproof ft. Gin Wigmore	Single of the Year	"Brother"	Deach, Gin Wigmore	Co-writer, featured vocal	Nominated
2008	NZ Music Awards	Recloose	Electronic	Perfect Timing	Matt Chicoine (tutor)	Artist, co-writer, producer	Won
2007	NZ Music Awards	The Mint Chicks	Album of the Year	Crazy? Yes! Dumb? No!	Mike Logie	Artist, bass, co-writer	Won
2007	NZ Music Awards	The Mint Chicks	Group	Crazy? Yes! Dumb? No!	Mike Logie	Artist, bass, co-writer	Won
2007	NZ Music Awards	The Mint Chicks	Rock	Crazy? Yes! Dumb? No!	Mike Logie	Artist, bass, co-writer	Won
2006	NZ Music Awards	Concord Dawn	Electronic	Chaos By Design	Evan Short	Artist, co-writer, producer	Won
2006	NZ Music Awards	Concord Dawn	Album of the Year	Chaos by Design	Evan Short	Artist, co-writer, producer	Nominated
2005	NZ Music Awards	SJD	Best Engineer	Southern Lights	Angus McNaughton (tutor)	Engineer, producer	Won
2005	NZ Music Awards	SJD	Best Producer	Southern Lights	Angus McNaughton (tutor)	Engineer, producer	Won
2005	NZ Music Awards	The Checks	Breakthrough Artist	What You Heard	Karel Chabera Jr.	Artist, bass	Won
2004	NZ Music Awards	Concord Dawn	Electronic	Uprising	Evan Short	Artist, co-writer, producer	Won
2006	NZ Music Awards	Mt Raskil Preservation Society	Single of the Year	"Bathe In The River"	Jean McAllister (tutor)	Backing vocals	Nominated
2006	NZ Music Awards	Recloose	Electronic	Hiatus on the Horizon	Matt Chicoine (tutor)	Artist, co-writer, producer	Nominated
2006	NZ Music Awards	Sola Rosa	Best Engineer	Moves On	Angus McNaughton (tutor)	Engineer	Nominated
1998	NZ Music Awards	Trip to the Moon	Jazz	Jazz Hop	Tom Ludvigson (tutor)	Artist	Nominated
1997	NZ Music Awards	Bluetrain	Jazz	No Free Lunch	Alan Brown (tutor)	Artist	Won
1997	NZ Music Awards	Nairobi Trio	Jazz	Shelf Life	John Quigley (tutor), Nigel Gavin (tutor)	Artists	Nominated
1997	NZ Music Awards	DLT, Che Fu, Kevin Rangihuna, Angus McNaughton	Songwriter	"Chains'	Angus McNaughton (tutor)	Writer	Won
1994	NZ Music Awards	Bluespeak	Jazz	Late Last Night	Tom Ludvigson (tutor)	Artist	Nominated
1994	NZ Music Awards	Nairobi Trio	Jazz	Through The Clouds	John Quigley (tutor), Nigel Gavin (tutor)	Artists	Nominated
1992	NZ Music Awards	Nairobi Trio	Jazz	Nairobi Trio	John Quigley (tutor), Nigel Gavin (tutor)	Artists	Nominated
1986	APRA Silver Scroll	The Narcs	APRA Silver Scroll	Abandoned By Love	Tony Waine (tutor)	Songwriter	Won
1984	NZ Music Awards	The Narcs	Single of the Year	You Took Me Heart & Soul	Dave McArtney (tutor), Tony Waine (tutor)	Producer, Bass	Won
1984	NZ Music Awards	The Narcs	Most Popular Song (Public Vote)	You Took Me Heart & Soul	Dave McArtney (tutor), Tony Waine (tutor)	Producer, Bass	Won
1984	NZ Music Awards	The Narcs	Best Producer	You Took Me Heart & Soul	Dave McArtney (tutor), Tony Waine (tutor)	Producer, bass	Won
1983	NZ Music Awards	The Narcs	Group of the Year	The Narcs	Tony Waine (tutor)	Bass, songwriter	Nominated
1982	NZ Music Awards	The Narcs	Group of the Year	The Narcs	Tony Waine (tutor)	Bass, songwriter	Nominated
1982	NZ Music Awards	DD Smash	Best Engineer	Cool Bananas	Paul Streekstra (tutor)	Engineer	Won
1981	NZ Music Awards	Dave McArtney	Male		Dave McArtney (tutor)	Artist, writer	Won
1981	NZ Music Awards	Dave McArtney & The Pink Flamingos	Group		Dave McArtney (tutor)	Artist, writer	Won
1981	NZ Music Awards	Dave McArtney	Most Promising Male		Dave McArtney (tutor)	Artist, writer	Won
1981	NZ Music Awards	Dave McArtney & The Pink Flamingos	Album of the Year	Dave McArtney & The Pink Flamingos	Dave McArtney (tutor)	Artist, writer	Won
1978	NZ Music Awards	Hello Sailor	Group		Harry Lyon (tutor), Dave McArtney (tutor)	Artists, writers	Won
1978	NZ Music Awards	Hello Sailor	Album of the Year	Hello Sailor	Harry Lyon (tutor), Dave McArtney (tutor)	Artists, writers	Won

Sources: APRA AMCOS Awards NZ Music Awards Grammy Awards
