= Higher (The Naked and Famous song) =

Single by The Naked and Famous

from the album Simple Forms
- Released: 8 July 2016
- Recorded: 2015–2016
- Length: 3:50
- Label: Somewhat Damaged
- Songwriters: The Naked and Famous
- Producers: The Naked and Famous; Thom Powers; Sombear (add.)

The Naked and Famous singles chronology
"Hearts Like Ours" (2013)	"Higher" (2016)	"Laid Low" (2016)

"Higher" is a song by New Zealand indie electronic band The Naked and Famous from their third studio album, Simple Forms. It was released on 8 July 2016 as the album's lead single.

== Background ==
After touring in support of their second studio album, In Rolling Waves (2013), the band began a sabbatical in mid-2014 from touring. Their third studio album, Simple Forms, was recorded at Powers' home studio in Echo Park, Los Angeles, amidst the end of an eight-year romantic relationship between lead vocalists Alisa Xayalith and Thom Powers. Xayalith stated, "It's been two years since we came off the road and a lot of life has happened in and all around us. We've been broken here and picked ourselves up again—so maybe this chorus talk a little to that experience...love, grief, time passing and returning to a place where we are lucky to have each other."

According to keyboardist Aaron Short, "Higher" was planned for inclusion on In Rolling Waves, and was originally "a lot more of a down-tempo, minimal electronic form", with Powers on vocals. The song was ultimately included on Simple Forms.

== Release and reception ==
In early July 2016, the group signed with Kobalt Label Services in North America for the release of the single, as well as their third studio album.

Consequence of Sound described the track as dealing with both passion and pain in great quantities, with "razor synths buzzsaw and grind before being uplifted by Xayalith's skyscraper vocals". The New Zealand Herald stated that "The Auckland five-piece are known for making synth-drenched festival singalongs, and Higher's shimmering hooks and shouted chorus is no different."

The song was used in a commercial for Comcast Xfinity.

== Track listings ==
- Digital download
1. "Higher"
- Digital download – FKYA Remix
1. "Higher" (FKYA Remix) – 3:50
- Digital download – RAC Remix
1. "Higher" (RAC Remix) – 4:30
- Digital download – Stripped
1. "Higher" (Stripped) – 4:02

== Credits and personnel ==
Credits adapted from the liner notes of Simple Forms.

- The Naked and Famous – production
- Thomas Powers – production
- Sombear – additional production
- Carlos de la Garza – live instrumentation engineering
- Ken Andrews – mixing
- Joe LaPorta – mastering

== Charts ==
Chart (2016)	Peak position
Canada Rock (Billboard)	47
New Zealand Heatseeker Singles (RMNZ)	2
US Alternative Airplay (Billboard)	39
US Hot Rock & Alternative Songs (Billboard)	45

== Certifications ==
Region	Certification	Certified units/sales
New Zealand (RMNZ)	Gold	15,000^{‡}
^{‡} Sales+streaming figures based on certification alone.

== Release history ==
Region	Date	Format	Version	Label	Ref.
Various	8 July 2016	Digital download	Original	Somewhat Damaged	
United States	2 August 2016	Alternative radio	Original	Kobalt; In2une	
Various	10 April 2017	Digital download	FKYA remix	Somewhat Damaged	
Various	19 May 2017	Digital download	RAC remix	Somewhat Damaged	
Various	28 July 2017	Digital download	Stripped	Somewhat Damaged	
