= No Light =

EP by The Naked and Famous
- Released: 8 September 2008
- Recorded: 2008
- Genre: Alternative rock
- Length: 19:00
- Label: Round Trip Mars
- Producer: Aaron Short; Thom Powers

The Naked and Famous chronology
This Machine (2008)	No Light (2008)	Passive Me, Aggressive You (2010)

No Light is the second extended play released by New Zealand band The Naked and Famous. It was released on 8 September 2008.

== Critical reception ==
Stuff described No Light as "yet another confident statement of intent from an up-and-coming Kiwi band that deserves all the hype it's getting".

== Track listing ==
No Light
No.	Title	Length
1.	"Dadada"	3:08
2.	"Birds"	3:21
3.	"Cheek"	3:19
4.	"Who Are You Talking To?"	2:48
5.	"Part 2"	2:37
6.	"Bells"	3:52
Total length:		19:00

== Personnel ==
Credits adapted from the liner notes of No Light.

Visuals and imagery

- Joel Kefali – art, design
- Campbell Hooper – art, design
- Troy Photography – photography
- Special Problems – photography

Instruments

- Ben Knapp – bass (tracks: 1–3, 5)
- Jordan Clark – live drums (tracks: 2–4)

Technical and production

- Aaron Short – engineering, mixing, production
- Thom Powers – engineering, mixing, production
- Ben Knapp – engineering elements (tracks: 1–5)
- Angus McNaughton – mastering

== Release history ==
Region	Date	Label	Format	Catalogue
New Zealand	8 September 2008	Round Trip Mars	CD	RTM 2012, CAT 80390
New Zealand	15 September 2008	Round Trip Mars	Digital download	—
Australia	15 September 2008	Round Trip Mars	Digital download	—
Canada	4 October 2011	Somewhat Damaged	Digital download	—
United States	4 October 2011	Somewhat Damaged	Digital download	—
Germany	4 November 2011	Somewhat Damaged	Digital download	—
Japan	4 November 2011	Somewhat Damaged	Digital download	—
United Kingdom	4 November 2011	Somewhat Damaged	Digital download	—
