= Soojin =

South Korean singer (born 1998)

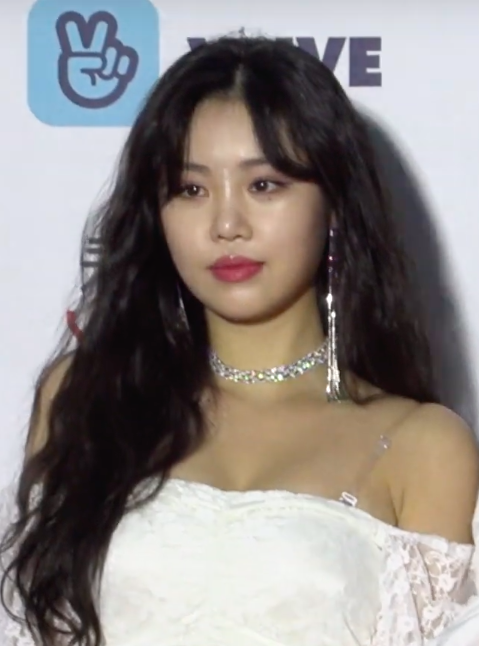
- Soojin in 2020
- Born: Seo Soo-jin; March 9, 1998 (age 28); Hwaseong, Gyeonggi, South Korea
- Occupations: Singer; dancer; rapper
- Musical career
- Genre: K-pop
- Instrument: Vocals
- Years active: 2015–2021; 2023–present
- Labels: Cube; Republic; BRD
- Formerly of: (G)I-dle; United Cube

Korean name
- Hangul: 서수진
- RR: Seo Sujin
- MR: Sŏ Sujin

Signature
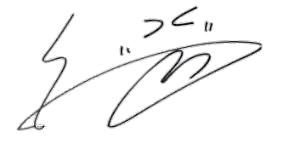

Seo Soo-jin (Korean: 서수진; born March 9, 1998), better known mononymously as Soojin, is a South Korean singer, dancer, and rapper. She is a former member of the South Korean girl group (G)I-dle under Cube Entertainment. After she left the group in 2021, she made her debut as a soloist with her debut EP Agassy, released on November 8, 2023 through BRD Communications.

== Early life ==
Soojin was born in Gyeonggi, South Korea. She attended Waw Middle School in Hwaseong. She later learned jazz dance and taekwondo while studying at the Korean Arts High School. She decided early in her life that she wanted to pursue a singing career, but said it took two years for her to convince her father to agree with her decisions.

== Career ==
=== Pre-debut ===
Soojin was a trainee under DN Entertainment and was originally supposed to be a member of the South Korean girl group Vividiva under her stage name N.Na (앤나). She took part in several performances and photo shoots of the group, but then left the group in 2015.

Then in 2016, Soojin became a trainee at Cube Entertainment. In 2017–2018 she appeared in fellow-member Soyeon's solo music videos for the songs "Jelly" and "Idle Song" as an unknown dancer and wearing a mask.

=== 2018–2020: Debut with (G)I-dle, and solo activities ===
In 2018, she was revealed as a member of the girl group (G)I-dle. She debuted with the group on May 2, 2018, following the release of the group's debut mini album, I Am and its lead single "Latata". (G)I-dle made their debut stage performance on Mnet's M Countdown.

In October 2020, Glance TV introduced their new fashion show Minnie Soojin's i'M THE TREND (민니 수진의 i'M THE TREND) and paired Seo and Minnie together. The duo had a styling battle every time for the title of 'Trend Center', which is a combination of a trend setter and an idol center. In addition, the duo revealed their styling secrets, various outfits, shopping tips and video pictorial 'Fashion Film'. The show premiered on October 14 through Naver Style TV.

=== 2021–2022: Bullying scandal, and departure from (G)I-dle and Cube Entertainment ===
On March 4, 2021, it was announced that Soojin would temporarily halt all activities following allegations of bullying by former classmates. On August 14, Cube Entertainment announced that Soojin had officially withdrawn from (G)I-dle, though she will remain under the same agency. (G)I-dle would continue its activities as a five-member girl group after her departure.

On March 5, 2022, Cube Entertainment announced that they officially terminated Soojin's contract after police investigations concluded that the accusers were not guilty of spreading false information. On September 8, Soojin's legal representative released a statement on her behalf, stating that "the school's Autonomous Committee for School Violence Countermeasures found her not guilty. Instead, they discovered she had been a victim of bullying, and no further legal action will be pursued".

=== 2023–present: New agency, and solo debut ===
On October 16, 2023, it was announced that Soojin signed an exclusive contract with BRD and was preparing to make her solo debut the same month. A dance performance video was released on October 25, entitled "Black Forest", teasing her upcoming solo debut. Her debut EP Agassy was released on November 8.

On May 23, 2024, Soojin released her second EP Rizz, with the title track "Mona Lisa".

On August 13, 2025, it was announced Soojin would release her first single Baditude on August 27.

== Discography ==
=== Extended plays ===
List of extended plays, showing selected details, selected chart positions, and sales figures
Title	Details	Peak chart positions	Sales
Title	Details	KOR	Sales
Agassy (아가씨)	Released: November 8, 2023; Label: BRD; Formats: CD, digital download, streaming	7	KOR: 107,726
Rizz	Released: May 23, 2024; Label: BRD; Formats: CD, digital download, streaming	7	KOR: 80,300

=== Single albums ===
List of single albums, showing selected details, selected chart positions, and sales figures
Title	Details	Peak chart positions	Sales
Title	Details	KOR	Sales
Baditude	Released: August 27, 2025; Label: BRD; Formats: CD, digital download, streaming	14	KOR: 15,972

=== Singles ===
List of singles, with year released, selected chart positions, and album name
Title	Year	Peak chart positions	Album
Title	Year	KOR DL	Album
"Agassy" (아가씨)	2023	84	Agassy
"Mona Lisa"	2024	172	Rizz
"Baditude"	2025	—	Baditude

== Videography ==
=== Music videos ===
Title	Year	Director(s)	Ref.
"Agassy" (아가씨)	2023	Kim Nam-suk (Segaji Video)	
"Mona Lisa"	2024	Ziyong Kim (Fantazy Lab)	

== Filmography ==
=== Television shows ===
Year	Title	Note	Ref.
2020	Minnie Soojin's i'm the Trend	Cast member with Minnie	
