= In Rolling Waves =

2013 studio album by the Naked and Famous

Studio album by the Naked and Famous
- Released: 13 September 2013
- Studios: Sunset Sound (Hollywood, California)
- Genres: Pop; electro; alternative rock
- Length: 55:35
- Labels: Fiction; Island
- Producers: Thom Powers; Aaron Short; Justin Meldal-Johnsen

The Naked and Famous chronology
Passive Me, Aggressive You (Remixes & B-Sides) (2013)	In Rolling Waves (2013)	Simple Forms (2016)

Singles from In Rolling Waves
- 1. "Hearts Like Ours" Released: 23 July 2013

Professional ratings
Aggregate scores
Source	Rating
Metacritic	72/100
Review scores
Source	Rating
AllMusic	4/5 stars
Alternative Press	3.5/5 stars
The A.V. Club	B
Clash	7/10
DIY	7/10
The Guardian	4/5 stars
musicOMH	3.5/5 stars
NME	7/10
PopMatters	5/10

In Rolling Waves is the second studio album by New Zealand indie electronic band the Naked and Famous, released on 13 September 2013 by Fiction Records and Island Records. On 23 July 2013, the album's lead single, "Hearts Like Ours", premiered on BBC Radio 1. The music video premiered on 29 July 2013.

== Touring ==
Following the release of the album, the band toured the United States with Orange County alternative rock band the Colourist. Following the release of the album, "A Stillness" has been used as the first tune performed at live shows.

== "A Stillness" ==
The song was released for streaming on August 28, 2013. The song is about getting ahead of worry and psychoanalysis, re-encountering love, stability, safety, tranquility, not straying and combatting the sense of despair that a person may have.

EastScene describes the song as one having a galaxial theme of discovery while nonetheless remaining grounded, as the keyboards and percussion instruments stray in opposing paths while veering along the same trail. Christopher Sheridan of Band Wagon Magazine describes the song as starting off slowly while rising up gradually and setting the tone for the momentum the band is known for, with Lauren Brown from Rock on Philly comparing lead vocalist Alisa Xayalith's resonant vocals to those of Yeah Yeah Yeahs front woman Karen Orzolek. Brown went on to say that the song did not portray the ensemble's electropop talent.

== Track listing ==
All tracks are written by Thom Powers, Alisa Xayalith and Aaron Short, except where noted. All tracks are produced by Powers and Short, except where noted.

In Rolling Waves standard edition track listing
No.	Title	Length
1.	"A Stillness"	5:22
2.	"Hearts Like Ours"	4:32
3.	"Waltz"	5:12
4.	"Rolling Waves"	3:39
5.	"The Mess" (producers: Powers, Justin Meldal-Johnsen)	4:06
6.	"Grow Old"	6:36
7.	"Golden Girl"	2:12
8.	"I Kill Giants" (producers: Powers, Meldal-Johnsen)	4:12
9.	"What We Want" (writers: Powers, Xayalith, Max McElligott)	4:19
10.	"We Are Leaving"	4:39
11.	"To Move with Purpose"	5:03
12.	"A Small Reunion"	5:45
Total length:		55:35

Deluxe edition bonus tracks
No.	Title	Writer(s)	Length
13.	"Hearts Like Ours" (Sombear vs The Naked and Famous)		4:12
14.	"I Kill Giants" (Big Black Delta Remix)		4:09
15.	"Waltz" (The Sight Below Remix)		6:21
16.	"Hearts Like Ours" (The Drunken Apaches Remix)		6:49
17.	"Rolling Waves" (covered by Strange Babes)		4:05
18.	"A Stillness" (Ducky Remix)		5:04
19.	"Hearts Like Ours" (Sombear Remix)		4:53
20.	"What We Want" (covered by The Chain Gang of 1974)	Powers; Xayalith; McElligott	4:14
21.	"I Kill Giants" (Kele Remix)		7:14
22.	"Hearts Like Ours" (MS MR Remix)		5:31
23.	"What We Want" (Maya Postepski Remix)	Powers; Xayalith; McElligott	5:23
24.	"A Small Reunion" (covered by Space Above)		5:02
25.	"Following Morning"		5:03
Total length:			123:30

== Personnel ==
Credits adapted from the liner notes of In Rolling Waves.

- Thom Powers – production (all tracks); string arrangements (track 12)
- Aaron Short – production (tracks 1–4, 6, 7, 9–12)
- Justin Meldal-Johnsen – production (tracks 5, 8)
- Billy Bush – engineering
- David Schwerkolt – engineering assistance
- Alan Moulder – mixing
- John Catlin – mix engineering
- Andrew Bulbrook – string arrangements (track 12)
- The Calder Quartet – strings (track 12)
  - Benjamin Jacobson – violin
  - Andrew Bulbrook – violin
  - Jonathan Moerschel – viola
  - Eric Byers – cello
- Joe LaPorta – mastering
- Joel Kefali – artwork

== Charts ==
Chart performance for In Rolling Waves
Chart (2013)	Peak position
Australian Albums (ARIA)	12
Austrian Albums (Ö3 Austria)	33
Canadian Albums (Billboard)	23
German Albums (Offizielle Top 100)	96
Irish Albums (IRMA)	68
New Zealand Albums (RMNZ)	4
Scottish Albums (Official Charts)	56
Swiss Albums (Schweizer Hitparade)	34
UK Albums (Official Charts)	53
US Billboard 200	48
US Top Alternative Albums (Billboard)	14
US Top Rock Albums (Billboard)	19

== Release history ==
Release dates and formats for In Rolling Waves
Region	Date	Format	Edition	Label	Ref.
New Zealand	13 September 2013	CD; digital download	Standard	Fiction; Island	
Australia	13 September 2013	CD; digital download	Standard	Fiction; Island	
Germany	13 September 2013	CD; digital download	Standard	Fiction	
United Kingdom	16 September 2013	CD; LP; digital download	Standard	Fiction	
Canada	17 September 2013	CD; digital download	Standard	Fiction; Republic	
United States	17 September 2013	CD; digital download	Standard	Fiction; Republic	
Japan	18 September 2013	Digital download	Standard	Somewhat Damaged	
United States	8 October 2013	LP	Standard	Fiction; Republic	
Australia	27 June 2014	Digital download	Deluxe	Somewhat Damaged	
Japan	27 June 2014	Digital download	Deluxe	Fiction	
United States	1 July 2014	Digital download	Deluxe	Fiction	
