= Punching in a Dream =

2010 single by the Naked and Famous

Single by the Naked and Famous

from the album Passive Me, Aggressive You
- B-side: "Wild"
- Released: 23 August 2010
- Genre: Synth-pop; dream pop
- Length: 3:33
- Label: Somewhat Damaged
- Songwriters: Thomas Powers; Alisa Xayalith; Aaron Short
- Producers: Thomas Powers; Aaron Short

The Naked and Famous singles chronology
"Young Blood" (2010)	"Punching in a Dream" (2010)	"Girls Like You" (2011)

"Punching in a Dream" is a song by New Zealand indie electronic band the Naked and Famous from their debut studio album, Passive Me, Aggressive You (2010). It was released on 23 August 2010 as the album's third single. The song debuted and peaked at number 11 on the New Zealand chart.

== In popular culture ==
The single was most recently featured in one of the trailers for Season 2 of the Netflix series Beef (2026). It was previously featured in the episodes "Kill or Be Killed" and "Our Town" of The Vampire Diaries and in the 2011 comedy Getting That Girl. It also appears on the soundtrack for EA Sports game, FIFA 12 and season 1 episode 7 of the show World of Jenks. The song is frequently used as the pre-match tune on Foxsports A-League coverage. It can also be heard in a car commercial for the 2012 GMC Terrain. The song can also be heard briefly in the short film Kony 2012. The song was used on the British series Made in Chelsea in 2011, and also in the 2012 film Pitch Perfect. The song was also used in the 2012 game Forza Horizon, as part of the Horizon Pulse radio station, which only plays indie music.

The music can also be heard during the Made in Chelsea General Hospital Sketch in Series 2, Episode 2 of British sketch comedy show Watson and Oliver.

== Track listings ==
Digital download

1. "Punching in a Dream" – 3:33

UK digital download

1. "Punching in a Dream" (Single version) – 3:34
2. "Punching in a Dream" (Music video) – 3:33

Digital download

1. "Punching in a Dream" (Single Version) – 3:34

UK limited edition 7" single
A. "Punching in a Dream" – 3:34
B. "Wild" – 3:53

Stripped version

1. "Punching in a Dream" (Stripped) – 3:28

== Charts ==
Chart (2010–12)	Peak position
Australia (ARIA)	56
Belgium (Ultratip Bubbling Under Flanders)	37
Belgium (Ultratip Bubbling Under Wallonia)	20
New Zealand (Recorded Music NZ)	11
UK Singles (Official Charts Company)	135
US Alternative Airplay (Billboard)	18
US Hot Rock & Alternative Songs (Billboard)	33

== Certifications ==
Certifications for "Punching in a Dream"
Region	Certification	Certified units/sales
New Zealand (RMNZ)	Platinum	30,000^{‡}
United Kingdom (BPI)	Silver	200,000^{‡}
^{‡} Sales+streaming figures based on certification alone.

== Release history ==
Region	Date	Format	Label	Ref.
New Zealand	23 August 2010	Digital download	Somewhat Damaged	
Denmark	5 December 2010	Digital download	Somewhat Damaged; Polydor	
Netherlands	5 December 2010	Digital download	Somewhat Damaged; Polydor	
Norway	5 December 2010	Digital download	Somewhat Damaged; Polydor	
Sweden	5 December 2010	Digital download	Somewhat Damaged; Polydor	
United Kingdom	5 December 2010	Digital download	Somewhat Damaged; Polydor	
United Kingdom	6 December 2010	7-inch single	Fiction; Polydor	
Australia	15 December 2017	Digital download – Stripped	Island	
New Zealand	15 December 2017	Digital download – Stripped	Island	
