= Passive Me, Aggressive You =

2010 studio album by the Naked and Famous

Studio album by the Naked and Famous
- Released: 6 September 2010
- Studios: The Lab (Auckland, New Zealand)
- Genres: Synth-pop; electro-rock
- Length: 49:15
- Label: Somewhat Damaged
- Producers: Thom Powers; Aaron Short

The Naked and Famous chronology
No Light (2008)	Passive Me, Aggressive You (2010)	Passive Me, Aggressive You (Remixes & B-Sides) (2013)

Singles from Passive Me, Aggressive You
- 1. "All of This" Released: 16 November 2009; 2. "Young Blood" Released: 7 June 2010; 3. "Punching in a Dream" Released: 23 August 2010; 4. "Girls Like You" Released: 5 June 2011

Passive Me, Aggressive You (stylised as Passive Me • Aggressive You) is the debut studio album by New Zealand indie electronic band the Naked and Famous, released on 6 September 2010 by Somewhat Damaged. The album debuted at number one on the New Zealand Albums Chart. The album spawned four singles: "All of This", "Young Blood", "Punching in a Dream" and "Girls Like You"; with "Young Blood" peaking at number one on the New Zealand Singles Chart.

== Composition ==
Passive Me, Aggressive You is a synth-pop and electro-rock album, drawing from the genres of dance-rock, and featuring post-punk influences. "Young Blood" is a synth-pop song, while "Punching in a Dream" is of the dream pop genre. "Spank" is psychedelic rock.

== Singles ==
The first single from Passive Me, Aggressive You, "All of This", was released on 16 November 2009, almost a year prior to the album's release.

"Young Blood" was released as the album's second single on 7 July 2010, debuting at number one on the New Zealand Singles Chart and spending two consecutive weeks atop the chart.

"Punching in a Dream" was released as the third single on 23 August 2010, reaching number 11 in New Zealand.

The album's fourth and final single, "Girls Like You", was released on 5 June 2011.

== Critical reception ==
Professional ratings
Aggregate scores
Source	Rating
Metacritic	72/100
Review scores
Source	Rating
AllMusic	4.5/5 stars
Consequence of Sound	2.5/5 stars
The Dominion Post	4/5 stars
The Nelson Mail	2.5/5 stars
The New Zealand Herald	5/5 stars
NME	8/10
Otago Daily Times	4/5 stars

Chris Schulz from Stuff.co.nz awarded Passive Me, Aggressive You five out of five stars, and praised its production and variety of musical styles. AllMusic's Matt Collar applauded the vocal performances and "hot" choruses, while observing the influence of Tears for Fears, OMD and the Human League. He awarded the album four-and-a-half out of five stars, concluding, "there's nothing passive about how much you could aggressively love this band". Scott Kara of The New Zealand Herald rated Passive Me, Aggressive You a perfect five stars, summarising "Forget the hype. It's real". The Nelson Mail's Nick Ward called Passive Me, Aggressive You "Unconvincing, but with flashes of promise". Writing for NME, Mark Baumont described the album as "a glorious melting pot of pop perfection" and added "TN&F’s passive melodicism and aggressive innovation clash in a dazzling blaze of psych/sonic fireworks." The album was nominated for the 2011 Taite Music Prize.

== Commercial performance ==
The album debuted at number one on the New Zealand Albums Chart on 13 September 2010, and was knocked off the top spot by Linkin Park's A Thousand Suns the following week.

== Track listing ==
All tracks are written by Thom Powers, Alisa Xayalith and Aaron Short.

No.	Title	Length
1.	"All of This"	3:55
2.	"Punching in a Dream"	3:58
3.	"Frayed"	3:46
4.	"The Source"	0:48
5.	"The Sun"	3:56
6.	"Eyes"	4:43
7.	"Young Blood"	4:06
8.	"No Way"	5:29
9.	"Spank"	4:10
10.	"Jilted Lovers"	3:15
11.	"A Wolf in Geek's Clothing"	3:14
12.	"The Ends"	1:49
13.	"Girls Like You"	6:04
Total length:		49:15

iTunes Store bonus track
No.	Title	Length
14.	"Machinery"	2:35
Total length:		51:50

Physical downloadable bonus track
No.	Title	Length
14.	"Wild"	3:53

Japanese edition bonus tracks
No.	Title	Length
14.	"Wild"	3:53
15.	"Sow"	4:06
16.	"Bright Lights"	2:36

All tracks are written by Thom Powers and Alisa Xayalith, except where noted.

UK deluxe edition – disc 2 (This Machine EP)
No.	Title	Length
1.	"Kill the Littleblackdots"	2:44
2.	"Serenade"	2:43
3.	"Meeting People Sucks" (Powers, Xayalith, Ben Knapp, Jordan Clark)	2:26
4.	"Part 1"	2:10
5.	"Post"	5:39
6.	"Spies Spies Spies"	3:38
Total length:		19:20

All tracks are written by Thom Powers and Alisa Xayalith, except where noted.

UK deluxe edition – disc 3 (No Light EP)
No.	Title	Length
1.	"Dadada"	3:10
2.	"Birds" (Xayalith, Powers, Ben Knapp, Jordan Clark)	3:21
3.	"Cheek" (Xayalith, Powers, Knapp, Clark)	3:19
4.	"Who Are You Talking To?" (Aaron Short, Xayalith, Powers)	2:48
5.	"Part 2"	2:37
6.	"Bells"	3:52
Total length:		19:04

== Personnel ==
Credits adapted from the liner notes of Passive Me, Aggressive You.

=== The Naked and Famous ===
- Aaron Short
- Alisa Xayalith
- David Beadle
- Jesse Wood
- Thom Powers

=== Technical ===
- Thom Powers – production, engineering
- Aaron Short – production, engineering
- Olly Harmer – additional engineering
- Billy Bush – mixing
- Emily Lazar – mastering
- Joe LaPorta – mastering

=== Artwork ===
- Special Problems – artwork, design, video

== Charts ==
=== Weekly charts ===
2010 weekly chart performance for Passive Me, Aggressive You
Chart (2010)	Peak position
New Zealand Albums (RMNZ)	1

2011 weekly chart performance for Passive Me, Aggressive You
Chart (2011)	Peak position
Australian Albums (ARIA)	25
Austrian Albums (Ö3 Austria)	56
Dutch Albums (Album Top 100)	74
German Albums (Offizielle Top 100)	31
Irish Albums (IRMA)	38
Scottish Albums (Official Charts)	28
Swiss Albums (Schweizer Hitparade)	74
UK Albums (Official Charts)	25
US Billboard 200	91
US Top Alternative Albums (Billboard)	12
US Top Rock Albums (Billboard)	20

=== Year-end charts ===
2010 year-end chart performance for Passive Me, Aggressive You
Chart (2010)	Position
New Zealand Albums (RMNZ)	39

2011 year-end chart performance for Passive Me, Aggressive You
Chart (2011)	Position
Australian Dance Albums (ARIA)	39

== Certifications ==
Certifications for Passive Me, Aggressive You
Region	Certification	Certified units/sales
New Zealand (RMNZ)	Gold	7,500^{^}
United Kingdom (BPI)	Silver	60,000^{‡}
^{^} Shipments figures based on certification alone.^{‡} Sales+streaming figures based on certification alone.

== Release history ==
Release dates and formats for Passive Me, Aggressive You
Region	Date	Format	Label	Catalogue
New Zealand	6 September 2010	CD; digital download	Somewhat Damaged	81359
Australia	6 September 2010	Digital download	Somewhat Damaged	—N/a
Canada	6 September 2010	Digital download	Somewhat Damaged	—N/a
United States	6 September 2010	Digital download	Somewhat Damaged	—N/a
Australia	1 October 2010	CD	Somewhat Damaged	2753221
Germany	11 March 2011	Digital download	Somewhat Damaged	—N/a
United Kingdom	14 March 2011	Digital download	Somewhat Damaged	—N/a
United Kingdom	14 March 2011	CD	Fiction; Somewhat Damaged	2757442
United Kingdom	14 March 2011	Picture disc LP	Fiction; Somewhat Damaged	2757444
United Kingdom	14 March 2011	3-CD deluxe edition	Fiction; Somewhat Damaged	2764039
United States	15 March 2011	CD	Universal Republic; Somewhat Damaged	B0015363-02
United States	15 March 2011	LP	Universal Republic; Somewhat Damaged	B0015436-01
Germany	18 March 2011	CD	Fiction; Somewhat Damaged	2757442
Japan	8 June 2011	CD; digital download	Universal	UICP-1127

== See also ==
- List of number-one albums in 2010 (New Zealand)
