= This Machine (EP) =

EP by The Naked and Famous
- Released: 5 May 2008
- Recorded: 2008
- Genre: Alternative rock
- Length: 19:20
- Label: Round Trip Mars
- Producer: Aaron Short; Thom Powers

The Naked and Famous chronology
This Machine (2008)	No Light (2008)

This Machine is the debut extended play released by a New Zealand band, The Naked and Famous. It was released on May 5 of 2008.

== Critical reception ==
Sunday Star Times reviewer Grant Smithies said "I’ve no doubt these songs will still be lighting my fuse long after 2008 has shuddered to a close."

== Track listing ==
This Machine
No.	Title	Length
1.	"Kill the Littleblackdots"	2:44
2.	"Serenade"	2:43
3.	"Meeting People Sucks"	2:26
4.	"Part 1"	2:10
5.	"Post"	5:39
6.	"Spies Spies Spies"	3:38
Total length:		19:20

== Personnel ==
Credits adapted from the liner notes of This Machine.

Visuals and imagery

- Joel Kefali – art, design
- Campbell Hooper – art, design
- Troy Photography – photography
- Special Problems – photography

Instruments

- Ben Knapp – bass (tracks: 2, 6)
- Jordan Clark – live drums (tracks: 2, 5–6)

Technical and production

- Aaron Short – engineering, mixing, production
- Thom Powers – engineering, mixing, production
- Ben Knapp – engineering elements (tracks: 1–2, 5–6)
- Angus McNaughton – mastering

== Release history ==
Region	Date	Label	Format	Catalogue
New Zealand	5 May 2008	Round Trip Mars	CD, Digital download	CAT 99904, RTM2011
Australia	5 May 2008	Round Trip Mars	Digital download	—
Canada	16 August 2011	Somewhat Damaged	Digital download	—
United States	16 August 2011	Somewhat Damaged	Digital download	—
Germany	4 November 2011	Somewhat Damaged	Digital download	—
Japan	4 November 2011	Somewhat Damaged	Digital download	—
United Kingdom	4 November 2011	Somewhat Damaged	Digital download	—
