= Young Blood (The Naked and Famous song) =

2010 single by the Naked and Famous

Single by the Naked and Famous

from the album Passive Me, Aggressive You
- Released: 7 June 2010
- Studio: The Lab, Auckland, New Zealand
- Genre: Synth-pop
- Length: 3:53
- Label: Somewhat Damaged; Neon Gold
- Songwriters: Thom Powers; Alisa Xayalith; Aaron Short
- Producers: Thom Powers; Aaron Short

The Naked and Famous singles chronology
| "All of This" (2009) | "Young Blood" (2010) | "Punching in a Dream" (2010) |

Alternative cover
- UK and US cover

Music video
- "Young Blood" on YouTube

"Young Blood" is a song by New Zealand band the Naked and Famous from their debut studio album, Passive Me, Aggressive You (2010). It was released on 7 June 2010 as the album's second single. "Young Blood" debuted at number one on the New Zealand Singles Chart. The song received the 2010 Silver Scroll for Song of the Year.

== Composition ==
"Young Blood" is a synth-pop song, featuring a buzz-guitar riff. Kevin Harley of BBC Music compared the song to the work of MGMT. According to Godfrey de Grut of NZ Musician, "Young Blood" is set in the key of F#, and follows the chord progression of B–F♯–B–F♯–C♯–B–F♯–B–D♯min–C♯. The theme of "Young Blood" is that of "spirit of youth" and its loss, and contains a "yeah, yeah, yeah, yeah" hook.

== Critical reception ==
The song received critical acclaim by music critics. AllMusic's Matt Collar noted "Young Blood" as one of the top tracks from Passive Me, Aggressive You and described it as "layered and shimmering". Tom Cardy from The Dominion Post called it "one of the catchiest indie electro tunes I've heard in years". The New Zealand Herald's Scott Kara labelled "Young Blood" as "an inventive, rousing, and uplifting tune".

On 8 September 2010 "Young Blood" won the APRA Silver Scroll, a New Zealand peer-judged songwriting award. APRA's Anthony Healey stated, "Young Blood is outstanding; it's stroppy, it's youthful and energetic. It makes me want to be eighteen again". At the awards ceremony it was covered by reggae band Three Houses Down. The Naked and Famous said being awarded with the honour was "surreal and intense".

== Chart performance ==
"Young Blood" debuted atop the New Zealand Singles Chart on 14 June 2010, becoming the first time a New Zealand artist debuted at number one in over three years; Matthew Saunoa's "Hold Out" did so in November 2006. The song held the top spot for another week, however on 28 June it was pushed to number two by "California Gurls" by Katy Perry and Snoop Dogg. "Young Blood" fell out of the singles chart in October 2010, having spent 18 weeks on the chart.

In Australia, "Young Blood" peaked at number 26 on the ARIA Singles Chart, while in Austria it remained on the Ö3 Austria Top 40 for 10 weeks, reaching number 53. The song peaked at number 59 on the Dutch Single Top 100 chart, spending five weeks on the chart.

In the United States, the song was featured as iTunes Store Single of the Week and was available for free of charge download during the week of 15–21 March 2011. It was certified platinum by the Recording Industry Association of America (RIAA) on 10 December 2013, denoting sales in excess of one million copies.

== Music video ==
The accompanying music video for "Young Blood" was directed by Joel Kefali and Campbell Hooper of Special Problems and filmed on location around Los Angeles.

== Covers ==
Jessie J covered "Young Blood" for BBC Radio 1's Live Lounge in March 2011. Chiddy Bang remixed it in September 2011. Birdy covered the song on her eponymous debut album Birdy. Her version was featured in the "Moment of Truth" episode of Grey's Anatomy and on Harry's Law at the end of episode "The Contest". A remix was also made by Dutch DJs Tiësto and Hardwell, whose version appears on Tiësto's album Club Life: Volume Two Miami. Machine Gun Kelly sampled "Young Blood" in his "Half Naked & Almost Famous" single.

== Use in media ==
In August 2010, the Israeli clothing company Castro featured "Young Blood" in their shoes commercial and later, in November 2010 the Winter collection advertisement included acoustic cover of the song.

With the relaunch of the television channel Viva on 1 January 2011, "Young Blood" gained popularity in Germany and Austria as it is used in the channels' idents and trailers. On 31 January 2011, it was used in the thirteenth episode of the fourth season of NBC's Chuck, during a sequence which was called the "best 10 minutes in the show's history" by series creator Josh Schwartz. In March 2011, Castro used it again in their shoes commercial. In Uzbekistan, the song was used in the advertisement of the mobile network operator UCell during May and June 2011.

The song was featured in the Strongbow 'Summer Blossom' advert in Australia. It was also used in Canon camera adverts. It was used as the theme of the French television series La Nouvelle Édition (2011–2013). This song was played right before the unveiling of the all-new 2013 Nissan Altima at the 2012 New York International Auto Show. UFC MMA fighter Maurício "Shogun" Rua used it as walk in music at UFC on Fox 4. "Young Blood" was featured in the Disney film Prom and in its trailer. The song was featured in the pilot of Covert Affairs, in both the first and last episodes of The Almighty Johnsons. The song was further featured in the episode "Panic Roommate" of the fourth season of Gossip Girl, in the season 3 premiere of TVNZ's Go Girls, and in a promo for the British show Skins. "Young Blood" was then used in the third episode of MTV's TV series Awkward, and in the pilot of The Secret Circle. It was also used in the pilot episode of CBS's TV show Elementary. It is featured on the season finale of Whitney. The song was featured in Travis Rice's The Art of Flight, a snowboarding film released 7 September 2011. A promo for the second season of the HGTV show Property Brothers features a cut of the song. The song is featured on the FOX telecast of the 2011 Major League Baseball World Series. The song is also featured in the trailer for the movies The Cabin in the Woods and Prom. The song was featured a bit in the Season 11 premiere of American Idol. The song is featured on the soundtrack for video game SSX. An alternate version of the song with a slower tempo is currently being featured in commercials for Trident Gum. This version is known as the Renholder Remix and was used in the soundtrack for Underworld: Awakening. A remix of the song by Dekade was featured in the 2013 American comedy film 21 & Over. In the Philippines, the song is used as the opening theme song of #SU, a student-oriented magazine TV talk show produced by students of Silliman University in Dumaguete, the show airs weekly on local cable TV station Fil Products Channel 6. This song was also used during the Fox 2011-2012 television schedule promo. It was featured in episode 10 of Germany's Next Topmodel, Cycle 6 and in the 2013 films Carrie and 21 & Over.

It was also featured in other movies and TV shows Partly Sunny, The Miracle Season, Stargirl, Dead Boy Detectives, Carrie and 9-1-1.

== Track listings ==
- Digital download
1. "Young Blood" – 3:52
- German CD single and UK 7-inch vinyl 1
1. "Young Blood" – 3:53
2. "Crazy? Yes! Dumb? No!" – 6:30
- UK CD single
1. "Young Blood" (Radio Edit) – 3:35
2. "Young Blood" – 3:53
- UK 7-inch vinyl 2
1. "Young Blood" – 3:53
2. "Sow" – 4:10
- New Zealand and Australian digital download 2
1. "Young Blood" (Radio Edit) – 3:34
2. "Young Blood" (Chiddy Bang Remix) – 3:32
- UK and Irish digital EP
1. "Young Blood" – 3:54
2. "Sow" – 4:06
3. "Young Blood" (David Andrew Sitek Remix) – 3:36
4. "Young Blood" (Music video) – 3:57
- Digital remix single
1. "Young Blood" (Tiësto & Hardwell Remix Radio Edit) – 3:31
2. "Young Blood" (Tiësto & Hardwell Remix) – 6:37
- Digital download – Stripped
1. "Young Blood" (Stripped) – 3:49

== Charts ==
=== Weekly charts ===
| Chart (2010–2012) | Peak position |
|---|---|
| Australia (ARIA) | 26 |
| Austria (Ö3 Austria Top 40) | 53 |
| Belgium (Ultratip Bubbling Under Flanders) | 34 |
| Belgium (Ultratip Bubbling Under Wallonia) | 27 |
| Canada Rock (Billboard) | 26 |
| France (SNEP) | 145 |
| Germany (GfK) | 30 |
| Netherlands (Single Top 100) | 59 |
| New Zealand (Recorded Music NZ) | 1 |
| Scottish Singles Sales (Official Charts) | 62 |
| UK Singles (Official Charts) | 64 |
| US Bubbling Under Hot 100 (Billboard) | 14 |
| US Alternative Airplay (Billboard) | 9 |
| US Hot Rock & Alternative Songs (Billboard) | 21 |

=== Year-end charts ===
| Chart (2010) | Position |
|---|---|
| New Zealand (RIANZ) | 33 |

| Chart (2011) | Position |
|---|---|
| US Alternative Songs (Billboard) | 23 |

== Certifications ==
Certifications for Young Blood
| Region | Certification | Certified units/sales |
|---|---|---|
| Australia (ARIA) | Platinum | 70,000^{^} |
| New Zealand (RMNZ) | 3× Platinum | 90,000^{‡} |
| United Kingdom (BPI) | Silver | 200,000^{‡} |
| United States (RIAA) | 2× Platinum | 2,000,000^{‡} |
^{^} Shipments figures based on certification alone.^{‡} Sales+streaming figures based on certification alone.

== Release history ==
| Region | Date | Format | Label | Ref. |
|---|---|---|---|---|
| Australia | 7 July 2010 | Digital download | Self-released | |
| New Zealand | 7 July 2010 | Digital download | Self-released | |
| United Kingdom | 6 September 2010 | CD single; 7-inch single | Neon Gold | |
| Austria | 14 November 2010 | Digital download | Somewhat Damaged; Polydor | |
| Denmark | 14 November 2010 | Digital download | Somewhat Damaged; Polydor | |
| Finland | 14 November 2010 | Digital download | Somewhat Damaged; Polydor | |
| Germany | 14 November 2010 | Digital download | Somewhat Damaged; Polydor | |
| Ireland | 14 November 2010 | Digital download | Somewhat Damaged; Polydor | |
| Italy | 14 November 2010 | Digital download | Somewhat Damaged; Polydor | |
| Japan | 14 November 2010 | Digital download | Somewhat Damaged; Polydor | |
| Netherlands | 14 November 2010 | Digital download | Somewhat Damaged; Polydor | |
| Norway | 14 November 2010 | Digital download | Somewhat Damaged; Polydor | |
| Sweden | 14 November 2010 | Digital download | Somewhat Damaged; Polydor | |
| Switzerland | 14 November 2010 | Digital download | Somewhat Damaged; Polydor | |
| United Kingdom | 14 November 2010 | Digital download | Somewhat Damaged; Polydor | |
| United States | 14 November 2010 | Digital download | Somewhat Damaged; Polydor | |
| Germany | 18 February 2011 | CD single | Somewhat Damaged; Polydor | |
| United Kingdom | 4 March 2011 | 7-inch single | Somewhat Damaged; Fiction | |
| Ireland | 6 March 2011 | Digital EP | Somewhat Damaged; Polydor | |
| United Kingdom | 6 March 2011 | Digital EP | Somewhat Damaged; Polydor | |
| Australia | 4 April 2011 | Digital download | Somewhat Damaged | |
| New Zealand | 4 April 2011 | Digital download | Somewhat Damaged | |
| Australia | 23 February 2018 | Digital download – Stripped | Somewhat Damaged | |
| New Zealand | 23 February 2018 | Digital download – Stripped | Somewhat Damaged | |
