= The Naked and Famous =

New Zealand band

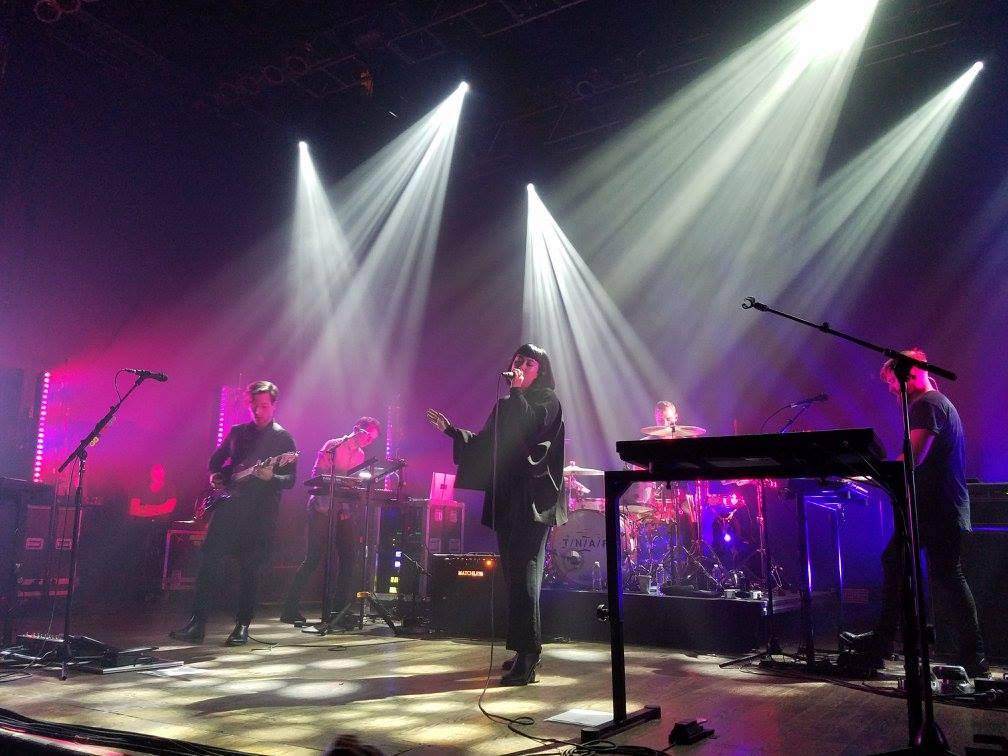
- The Naked and Famous performing in November 2016

Background information
- Origin: Auckland, New Zealand
- Genres: Indie electronic; post-punk revival; indie rock; synth-pop; electro-rock; noise pop; new wave
- Years active: 2007–2020; 2025
- Labels: Somewhat Damaged; Fiction; Universal Republic; Island
- Members: Alisa Xayalith; Thom Powers
- Past members: Ben Knapp; Jordan Clark; Aaron Short; Jesse Wood; David Beadle; Luna Shadows
- Website: thenakedandfamous.com

The Naked and Famous are a New Zealand indie electronic band from Auckland, formed in 2007. The band currently consists of Alisa Xayalith (vocals, keyboards) and Thom Powers (vocals, guitars).

The band has released four studio albums: Passive Me, Aggressive You (2010), In Rolling Waves (2013), Simple Forms (2016) and Recover (2020). Since 2012, the band has been based in Los Angeles, California.

== History ==
Xayalith (born 1986 in Auckland) is the daughter of Laotian refugees and was raised together with a younger brother. Her father introduced her to his native folk music and, at the age of 13, she taught herself guitar. Powers had been playing in local bands from an early age after he had been taught to play guitar by his father.

=== 2007–2008: Early years ===
The band formed in 2007 when Powers and Xayalith were working on what became two extended plays—This Machine and No Light—that they recorded with engineer Aaron Short, a fellow student at Auckland's Music and Audio Institute of New Zealand. The EPs were subsequently released on local independent label Round Trip Mars. Powers and Xayalith began performing live with Ben Knapp and Jordan Clark on bass and drums respectively, while Aaron Short became a performing member of the group. Knapp and Clark left the group in 2009 and were subsequently replaced with Jesse Wood and David Beadle.

=== 2009–2011: Passive Me, Aggressive You ===
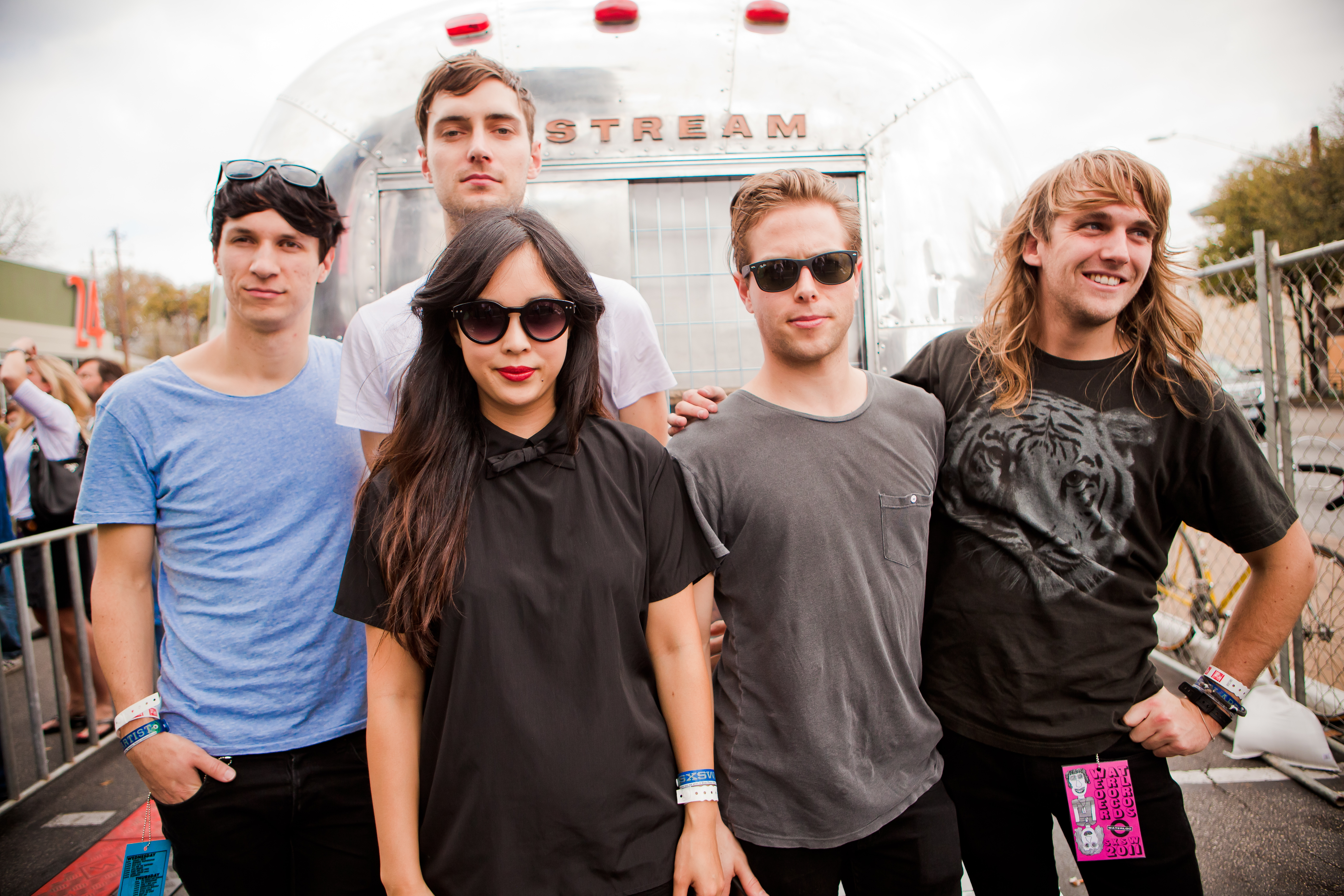
The Naked and Famous at the South by Southwest festival in 2011

After recording "All of This", the group then set about recording the single "Young Blood" and their debut album, recording mostly at home and at Auckland studio The Lab. "Young Blood" debuted on the New Zealand chart at number one on 14 June 2010—the first New Zealand artist in three years to do so. The Naked and Famous released their debut studio album, Passive Me, Aggressive You, on 6 September 2010 on their own label, Somewhat Damaged. The album was produced by Thom Powers and Aaron Short, and mixed by Billy Bush.

On 6 December 2010, the BBC announced that The Naked and Famous had been nominated for BBC's Sound of 2011 poll.

In 2011, the band garnered six nominations at the New Zealand Music Awards for Album of the Year, Single of the Year, Best Group, Breakthrough Artist of the Year, Best Alternative Album and the People's Choice Award. They were also nominated for the NZ On Air Best Music Video and won the MAINZ Best Engineer Award and its Best Producer Award.

=== 2012–2013: In Rolling Waves ===
The band settled in Los Angeles in mid-2012 after completing touring for Passive Me, Aggressive You. They had performed over 200 shows in 24 countries between 2010 and 2012. Sharing a home over the back of Laurel Canyon, they began work on writing and demoing their second album. They intended to record an album that could be played live, not relying on backing tracks—something the group had always eschewed.

On 28 February 2013, the band announced One Temporary Escape, a concert film recorded at The Warfield in San Francisco in 2012. It was released for free download on 18 March 2013.

Entering Los Angeles' Sunset Sound studio in March 2013 with engineer Billy Bush (who had mixed the previous album), they began the process of recording In Rolling Waves. The album sessions were completed in a month and then in June 2013, The Naked and Famous headed for London where Alan Moulder spent a month mixing the album at his Willesden studio, Assault and Battery. The album was mastered at Sterling Sound in New York by Joe LaPorta, who had also mastered Passive Me, Aggressive You, and was produced by Thom Powers with Aaron Short. Justin Meldal-Johnsen co-produced two tracks with Powers.

On 23 July 2013, the band revealed their new single "Hearts Like Ours" along with the release date for their second studio album In Rolling Waves, on 16 September 2013 in the UK.

=== 2014–present: Simple Forms, Recover and Xayalith solo career ===
The Naked and Famous performed at Coachella in 2014. On 20 November 2014, the band announced that they had begun working on a third album. The band began tracking for the album in September 2015. In March 2016, they performed at the Wanderland Music and Arts Festival in Manila.

On 3 July 2016, the band announced their new single "Higher" would be released on 7 July. Upon the single's release, the band revealed that their third studio album, Simple Forms, was set to be released on 14 October 2016 via their label Somewhat Damaged in conjunction with Kobalt Label Services. On 24 August 2016, they released another single titled "Laid Low". The album was recorded at Powers' Echo Park studio and released as per the announcement.

In February 2017, it was announced that the band would perform as opening acts, alongside Wavves, in Blink-182's 2017 spring tour which would visit mostly the southern United States.

Arron Short founded a new project called Space Above and released the album Still with them on February 17 2017. The project was described as "Darker" and without the pop structures of Naked and Famous.

The band released an acoustic compilation album titled A Still Heart on 9 March 2018, at which time they indicated that they were working on their fourth studio album. That same month, it was announced that Jesse Wood and founding member Aaron Short had departed the band. Following their departure, Luna Shadows joined the band on piano. The group released A Still Heart (Live) on 8 June 2018.

Sometime before March 2020, the group parted ways with Beadle and Shadows.

In April 2020, the band announced that Recover, their fourth studio album, would be released on 24 July 2020.

In October 2025, the band performed together for the first time in over five years, at the 2025 Singapore Grand Prix.

== Name ==
The Naked and Famous took their name from English musician Tricky's song "Tricky Kid", which expressed ambivalence about the notion of celebrity. In the song, Tricky quotes the line "everybody wants to be naked and famous", from The Presidents of the United States of America's song "Naked and Famous".

== Band members ==
Current

- Alisa Xayalith – vocals, keyboards (2008–present)
- Thom Powers – vocals, guitars (2008–present)

Former

- Aaron Short – keyboards (2008–2018)
- Ben Knapp – bass (2008–2009)
- Jordan Clark – drums (2008–2009)
- David Beadle – bass (2009–2020)
- Jesse Wood – drums (2009–2018)
- Luna Shadows - keyboards (2018–2020; 2025)

Timeline

== Discography ==
- Passive Me, Aggressive You (2010)
- In Rolling Waves (2013)
- Simple Forms (2016)
- Recover (2020)

== Awards and nominations ==
Year	Organisation	Nominated work	Award	Result
2010	APRA Silver Scroll	"Young Blood"		Won
2010	New Zealand Music Awards	Passive Me, Aggressive You	Critics' Choice Prize	Nominated
2011	New Zealand Music Awards	Passive Me, Aggressive You	MAINZ Best Producers	Won
2011	New Zealand Music Awards	Passive Me, Aggressive You	MAINZ Best Engineers	Won
2011	New Zealand Music Awards	Passive Me, Aggressive You	Album of the Year	Won
2011	New Zealand Music Awards	Passive Me, Aggressive You	Best Alternative Album	Won
2011	New Zealand Music Awards	"Young Blood"	Single of the Year	Won
2011	New Zealand Music Awards	The Naked and Famous	Best Group	Won
2011	New Zealand Music Awards	The Naked and Famous	Breakthrough Artist	Won
2011	New Zealand Music Awards	The Naked and Famous	People's Choice Award	Nominated
2011	Taite Music Prize	Passive Me, Aggressive You		Nominated
2011	NME	The Naked & Famous	Phillip Hall Radar Award	Won
2014	New Zealand Music Awards	-	-	-
2014	New Zealand Music Awards	-	-	-
2014	New Zealand Music Awards	-	-	-
2014	New Zealand Music Awards	The Naked & Famous	Best Group	Won
