= Alisa Xayalith =

New Zealand musician (born 1986)

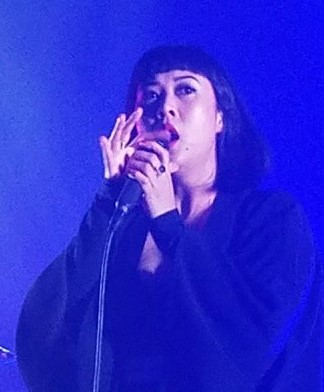
- Xayalith performing with the Naked and Famous in 2016

Background information
- Born: 24 August 1986 (age 40); New Zealand
- Origin: Auckland, New Zealand
- Genres: Indie electronic; post-punk revival; indie rock; synth-pop; electro-rock; noise pop; new wave
- Occupations: Musician, songwriter
- Instruments: Vocals; guitar; keyboards
- Years active: 2007–present
- Label: Somewhat Damaged
- Member of: The Naked and Famous

Alisa Xayalith (born 24 August 1986) is a New Zealand musician best known as the lead vocalist, guitarist, and keyboard player for the indie electronic band the Naked and Famous.

== Early life ==
Xayalith, the daughter of Laotian refugees, was born in New Zealand and grew up in South Auckland. She has one sister and three brothers. Shortly after Xayalith's seventh birthday, her mother died from breast cancer. Her father was a vocalist in a local Laotian ensemble.

== Career ==
=== 2006–2021: The Naked and Famous ===
In 2006, Xayalith met Thom Powers and Aaron Short at the Music and Audio Institute of New Zealand. They formed the band the Naked and Famous, and Powers and Xayalith began dating. In 2012, the quintet moved to Los Angeles, California. In 2014, Powers and Xayalith ended their romantic relationship but remained part of the band.

The Naked and Famous parted ways with Short and Jesse Wood in 2018, followed by their split with Luna Shadows and David Beadle some time prior to March 2020. As of December 2021, the ensemble continues to perform as a duo composed of Powers and Xayalith.

=== 2021–present: Solo work ===
In December 2021, Xayalith published a song entitled "High Fidelity", the first single from her EP Superpowers, which was released in 2022. The track was produced by Tyler Spry and Simon Oscroft, with a music video directed by Jason Lester.

In April 2025, Xayalith released her debut studio album, Slow Crush. This was preceded by the singles "Chaotic", "Ordinary Love", "Boys & Guitars", "Roses", and "What the Hell Do We Do Now".

== Discography ==
=== Albums ===
List of albums, with selected details
Title	Details
Slow Crush	Released: 4 April 2025; Label: Nettwerk; Format: CD, digital

=== EPs ===
List of EPs, with selected details
Title	Details
Superpowers	Released: 18 November 2022; Label: Alisa Xayalith; Format: Digital

=== Singles ===
- "High Fidelity" (2021)
- "I'll Be There" (2022)

=== As featured artist ===
- "Psychadelic Girl" by Kidz in Space, from Episode 001: Chasing Hayley (2009)
- "Tucan" by Kids of 88, from Modern Love (2012)
- "Forget" by The Chain Gang of 1974, from Felt (2017)
- "Move" by Peking Duk (2020)
- "Half Light" by Attlas, from Lavender God (2020)

=== As songwriter ===
- "Half Naked & Almost Famous" by Machine Gun Kelly, from Rage Pack (2011) as well as Lace Up/Half Naked & Almost Famous (2012)
- "Little Deaths" by Sir Sly, from The Rise & Fall of Loverboy (2021)

=== Other credits ===
- Various background vocals, Human by OneRepublic (2021)
- Co-writer, "Bloodredroses" by Soojin (2023)
