= 2024 Aotearoa Music Awards =

New Zealand music award ceremony

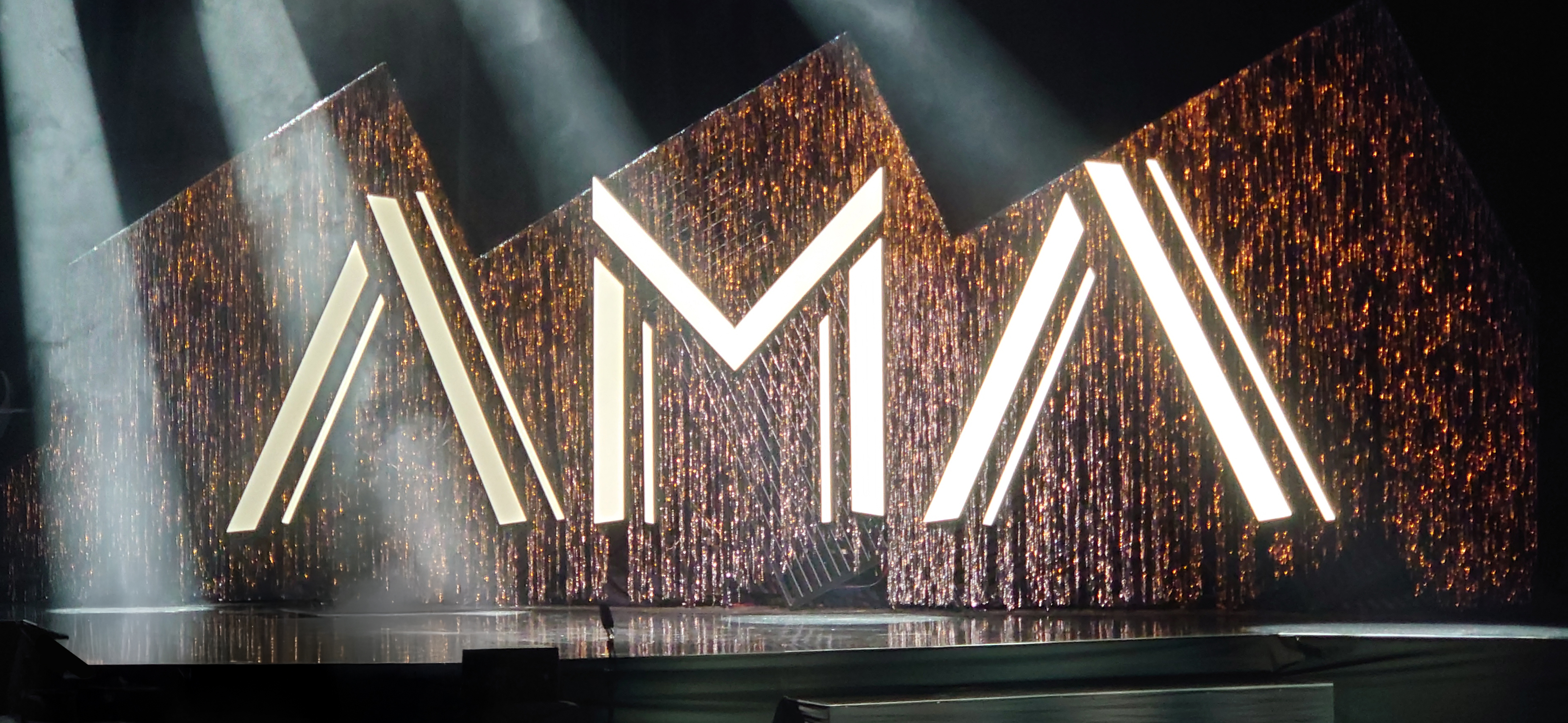
- The stage at the 2024 awards ceremony
- Awarded for: Excellence in New Zealand music
- Date: 30 May 2024
- Location: Viaduct Events Centre
- Presented by: Recorded Music NZ
- Hosted by: Jesse Mulligan & Kara Rickard
- Reward: Tūī trophy
- Website: Official website

Television/radio coverage
- Network: Radio NZ, TVNZ+

The 2024 Aotearoa Music Awards was the 57th holding of the annual ceremony featuring awards for New Zealand music recording artists. The awards took place on 30 May 2024 at the Viaduct Events Centre in Auckland and was hosted by Jesse Mulligan and Kara Rickard.

2024 was the first time a televised public ceremony had taken place since 2021; COVID-19 affected the 2022 awards, and the awards had a hiatus for 2023.

The awards were live streamed by Radio New Zealand, and made available to watch the next day on TVNZ+.

== Background ==
Recorded Music NZ commissioned a review of the awards following 2022, to ensure that they remained relevant in the current landscape; due to the review, no awards were held in 2023. For 2024, the awards were moved to the end of May, to coincide with New Zealand Music Month; previously they had been held in October/November. Nominations for the 2024 awards had an extended eligibility period dating back to 2022.

Two new award categories were introduced in 2024; the Breakthrough Single of the Year (Te Tino Waiata Iti Rearea o te Tau) was created alongside the pre-existing Breakthrough Artist of the Year award, and the Te Manu Mātārae category was introduced to recognise "artists that have made a significant impact on the music landscape" during the eligibility period.

A new Tūī trophy design was introduced in 2024. While the shape—first introduced in 1996—remained the same, the new Tūī are carved from tōtara, which was seen as more ecologically-friendly than the previous electroplated trophy.

== Ceremony ==
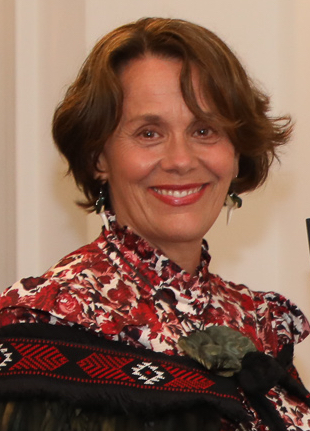
Dame Hinewehi Mohi was inducted into the NZ Music Hall of Fame at the awards.

The awards were held on the evening of 30 May 2024 at Auckland's Viaduct Events Centre, and were hosted by journalists Jesse Mulligan and Kara Rickard. The night was split between an opening ceremony, in which the technical and genre categories were awarded, followed by the "main showcase" featuring live performances and the major award categories.

A kapa haka group from Western Springs College delivered a haka pōwhiri to open the ceremony. The opening also featured live performances from MOHI and Jordyn with a Why.

Stan Walker opened the main showcase with a performance of "I Am". The showcase also featured live performances from Corrella, Kaylee Bell, Princess Chelsea, and Coterie.

Dame Hinewehi Mohi received a standing ovation, following a tribute from Moana Maniapoto inducting her into the New Zealand Music Hall of Fame.

The ceremony closed with Mohi – joined by Drax Project, Stan Walker, Rob Ruha, MOHI and Jordyn with a Why – performing her 1999 hit "Kotahitanga".

== Nominees and winners ==
Winners are listed first, highlighted in boldface, and indicated with a double dagger (‡).

Album of the Year Te Tino Pukaemi o te Tau	Single of the Year Te Tino Waiata Tōtahi o te Tau
**The Beths – Expert in a Dying Field**‡; Avantdale Bowling Club – Trees; Coterie – Coterie; Erny Belle – Not Your Cupid; Home Brew – Run It Back; Leisure – Leisurevision; Marlon Williams – My Boy; Paige – King Clown; Princess Chelsea – Everything Is Going To Be Alright; Stan Walker – All In; Tiny Ruins – Ceremony; Unknown Mortal Orchestra – V	**"Friday Night At The Liquor Store" – Avantdale Bowling Club**‡; Aaradhna – "She"; Corrella – "Blue Eyed Māori"; Coterie – "Always Beside You" (ft. Six60); Fazerdaze – "Bigger"; Home Brew – "Run It Back"; Kaylee Bell – "Boots 'N All"; L.A.B – "Take It Away"; Marlon Williams – "Don’t Go Back"; Mermaidens – "I Like To Be Alone"; Stan Walker – "I Am"; The Beths – "Watching The Credits"
Best Solo Artist Te Tino Reo o te Tau	Best Group Te Tino Kāhui Manu Taki o te Tau
**Marlon Williams**‡; Avantdale Bowling Club; Fazerdaze; Kaylee Bell; Marlon Williams; Princess Chelsea; Stan Walker	**The Beths**‡; Home Brew; Leisure; Mermaidens; Tiny Ruins; Unknown Mortal Orchestra
Best Māori Artist Te Manu Taki Māori o te Tau	Mana Reo Te Mangai Pāho Mana Reo
**TAWAZ**‡; Jordyn with a Why; Mohi; Rei; Stan Walker; Tuari Brothers	**"He Aho" – TAWAZ**‡; Coterie – "Purea / Cool It Down"; Jordyn with a Why – "He Rei Niho"; Mohi – "Me Pēhea Ra"; Stan Walker – "I Am"; Tuari Brothers – "Tuari ki te Ao"
Breakthrough Single of the Year Te Tino Waiata ā-Iti Rearea o te Tau	Breakthrough Artist of the Year Te Iti Rearea o te Tau
**"Blue Eyed Māori" – Corrella**‡; "Whatever" – Cassie Henderson; "He Said" – Jordan Gavet; "Till You're Ready" – Navvy; "Close with Desires" – Teo Glacier	**Coterie**‡; 9lives; Hori Shaw; MOHI; SXMPRA
Best Pop Artist Te Manu Taki Arotini o te Tau	Best Alternative Artist Te Manu Taki Whanokē o te Tau
**Georgia Lines**‡; Foley; Paige	**Princess Chelsea**‡; Grecco Romank; Mermaidens
Best Soul / RnB Artist Te Manu Taki Manako o te Tau	Best Hip Hop Artist Te Manu Taki Ātete o te Tau
**Aaradhna**‡; Dallas Tamaira; Sam V	**Home Brew** ‡; Avantdale Bowling Club; Diggy Dupé
Best Roots Artist Te Manu Taki Taketake o te Tau	Best Rock Artist Te Manu Taki Rakapioi o te Tau
**Corrella**‡; Coterie; Sons of Zion	**Racing**‡; Dead Favours; Midwave Breaks
Best Electronic Artist Te Manu Taki Tāhiko o te Tau	Best Classical Artist Te Manu Taki Tuauki o te Tau
**Amamelia**‡; deepState; Elipsa	**New Zealand String Quartet**‡; Michael Houston & Bella Hristova; Natasha Te Rupe-Wilson & Somi Kim

=== Additional awards ===
The following awards were also presented:

Best Country Artist Te Manu Taki Tuawhenua o te Tau	Best Folk Artist Te Manu Taki Ahurea o te Tau
**Kaylee Bell**‡; Matt Joe Gow; The Mitchell Twins	Adam McGrath‡; Terrible Sons; Tom Lark
Best Children's Music Artist Te Manu Taki Kerekahu o te Tau	Best Jazz Artist (Te Kaipuoro Tautito Toa)
**Claudia Robin Gunn**‡	**Myele Manzanza**‡; Clear Path Ensemble; Dave Wilson

=== Artisan awards ===
Best Album Artwork Te Taumata o te Toi	Best Music Video Content Te Taumata o te Ataata
**Lily Paris West – Expert In A Dying Field** **by The Beths**‡; Andrew McLeod – The Coin That Broke The Fountain Floor by Clementine Valentine; Lily Paris West – Mermaidens by Mermaidens	**Anahera Parata –** **"She" by Aaradhna**‡; Connor Pritchard – "All My Friends" by No Comply (ft. Wells); Marlon Williams – "Don’t Go Back" by Marlon Williams
Best Producer Te Taumata o te Kaiwhakaputa	Best Engineer Te Taumata o te Pūkenga Oro
**Haz Beats – Run It Back** **by Home Brew**‡; Christoph El Truento – Trees by Avantdale Bowling Club; Tom Healy – Ceremony by Tiny Ruins	**Tom Healy & Alexandra Corbett – My Boy** **by Marlon Williams**‡; Amelia Murray & Emily Wheatcroft-Snape – Break! by Fazerdaze; Simon Gooding – King Clown by Paige

=== Special awards ===
People's Choice Award
Tā te Iwi
- **Hori Shaw**‡
Highest Selling Artist
Te Taumata o te Hokona
- **Six60**‡
Radio Airplay Record of the Year
Te Taumata o te Horapa
- **"Take It Away" – L.A.B**‡

NZ Music Hall of Fame Te Whare Taonga Puoro o Aotearoa	Te Manu Mātarae
**Dame Hinewehi Mohi**	**Stan Walker**; **Kaylee Bell**
