= The Beths discography =

- Studio albums: 4
- EPs: 1
- Live albums: 1
- Singles: 23
- Music videos: 19
- Split singles: 1

The discography of New Zealand indie rock band the Beths consists of four studio albums, one extended play, one live album, 23 singles, one split single, three guest appearances, and nineteen music videos. Their most recent studio album, Straight Line Was a Lie, was released in 2025.

== Albums ==
=== Studio albums ===
List of studio albums, with release date and label shown
Title	Details	Peak chart positions							
Title	Details	NZ	AUS	SCO	UK Sales	UK Indie	UK Rock	US Sales	US Heat
Future Me Hates Me	Released: 10 August 2018; Label: Carpark, Ivy League; Formats: vinyl, CD, digital download, streaming, cassette	19	—	—	—	47	27	—	—
Jump Rope Gazers	Released: 10 July 2020; Label: Carpark, Rough Trade, Ivy League; Formats: Vinyl, CD, digital download, streaming, cassette	2	—	35	32	8	—	54	—
Expert in a Dying Field	Released: 16 September 2022; Label: Carpark, Rough Trade, Ivy League; Formats: Vinyl, CD, digital download, streaming, cassette	1	80	24	22	9	—	23	6
Straight Line Was a Lie	Released: 29 August 2025; Label: Anti-; Formats: Vinyl, CD, digital download, streaming	5	83	37	25	11	—	—	—
"—" denotes a recording that did not chart or was not released in that territory.

=== Live albums ===
List of live albums, with release date and label shown
Title	Details	Peak chart positions			
Title	Details	NZ	UK Record	UK Indie Break.	UK Rock
Auckland, New Zealand, 2020	Released: 17 September 2021; Label: Carpark, Ivy League; Formats: Vinyl, CD, digital download, streaming	19	24	15	31

== Extended plays ==
List of EPs, with release date and label shown
Title	Details	Peak chart positions
Title	Details	UK Sales
Warm Blood	Released: 11 March 2016; Label: Carpark, Ivy League; Formats: Vinyl, CD, digital download, streaming, cassette	84

== Singles ==
=== As lead artist ===
List of singles, with selected chart positions, showing year released and album name
Title	Year	Peak chart positions			Album
Title	Year	NZ Hot	NZ Artist Hot	US AAA	Album
"Idea/Intent"	2015	—	—	—	Warm Blood
"Whatever"	2016	—	—	—	Warm Blood
"Lying in the Sun"	2016	—	—	—	Warm Blood
"Great No One"	2017	—	—	—	Future Me Hates Me
"Future Me Hates Me"	2018	—	18	—	Future Me Hates Me
"Happy Unhappy"	2018	—	—	—	Future Me Hates Me
"You Wouldn't Like Me"	2018	—	17	—	Future Me Hates Me
"Little Death"	2018	—	—	—	Future Me Hates Me
"Have Yourself a Merry Little Christmas"	2018	—	—	—	Non-album single
"Dying to Believe"	2020	—	7	—	Jump Rope Gazers
"I'm Not Getting Excited"	2020	—	6	—	Jump Rope Gazers
"Out of Sight"	2020	—	8	—	Jump Rope Gazers
"A Real Thing"	2022	—	9	—	Expert in a Dying Field (Deluxe Edition)
"Silence Is Golden"	2022	—	9	—	Expert in a Dying Field
"Expert in a Dying Field"	2022	35	9	—	Expert in a Dying Field
"Knees Deep"	2022	—	19	—	Expert in a Dying Field
"Watching the Credits"	2023	—	13	—	Expert in a Dying Field (Deluxe Edition)
"Your Side"	2024	—	14	—	Expert in a Dying Field
"Metal"	2025	—	10	9	Straight Line Was a Lie
"No Joy"	2025	—	—	—	Straight Line Was a Lie
"Mother, Pray for Me"	2025	—	19	—	Straight Line Was a Lie
"Straight Line Was a Lie"	2025	19	3	19	Straight Line Was a Lie
"Til My Heart Stops"	2026	—	—	—	Straight Line Was a Lie
"—" denotes a recording that did not chart or was not released in that territory.

=== Split singles ===
List of split singles, with year released and other artists shown
Title	Year	Peak chart positions		Other artist(s)
Title	Year	NZ Artist Hot	UK Sales	Other artist(s)
"Brand New Colony" / "We Looked Like Giants"	2023	14	20	Pickle Darling, Car Seat Headrest

== Other charted songs ==
List of other charted songs, with selected chart positions, showing year released and album name
Title	Year	Peak chart positions		Album
Title	Year	NZ Hot	NZ Artist Hot	Album
"Jump Rope Gazers"	2020	18	1	Jump Rope Gazers
"Acrid"	2020	—	8	Jump Rope Gazers
"Do You Want Me Now"	2020	—	9	Jump Rope Gazers
"Don't Go Away"	2020	—	11	Jump Rope Gazers
"What's the Matter with You"	2021	—	18	True Colours, New Colours: The Songs of Split Enz
"I Want to Listen"	2022	—	17	Expert in a Dying Field
"When You Know You Know"	2022	38	12	Expert in a Dying Field
"Mosquitoes"	2025	33	7	Straight Line Was a Lie
"Til My Heart Stops"	2025	—	9	Straight Line Was a Lie
"Take"	2025	—	10	Straight Line Was a Lie
"—" denotes a recording that did not chart or was not released in that territory.

== Guest appearances ==
List of other featured appearances
Title	Year	Album
"Mississippi Moonshine Girls"	2016	Waiting for Your Love: A Tribute to The Reduction Agents
"What's the Matter with You"	2021	True Colours, New Colours: The Songs of Split Enz
"How Lonely Are You?", "Under the Rolling Moon", and "Always There"	2021	Modern Fiction

== Music videos ==
List of music videos, with year released and director shown
Title	Year	Director
"Whatever"	2016	Alex Hoyles
"Lying in the Sun"	2016	Dahnu Graham
"Future Me Hates Me"	2018	Christopher Stratton
"You Wouldn't Like Me"	2018	Ezra Simons
"Little Death"	2018	Norwood Cheek
"Have Yourself a Merry Little Christmas"	2018	The Bub Club and Hamish Parkinson
"Uptown Girl"	2019	Callum Devlin and the Beths
"Dying to Believe"	2020	Callum Devlin
"I'm Not Getting Excited"	2020	Callum Devlin
"Out of Sight"	2020	Ezra Simons
Auckland, New Zealand, 2020 (live concert film)	2021	Callum Devlin
"Silence Is Golden"	2022	Callum Devlin
"Expert In a Dying Field"	2022	Frances Carter
"Knees Deep"	2022	Callum Devlin and Annabel Kean
"Your Side"	2024	Tristan Deck
"Metal"	2025	Callum Devlin
"No Joy"	2025	Frances Carter
"Mother, Pray for Me"	2025	Callum Devlin and Annabel Kean
"Til My Heart Stops"	2026	Frances Carter
