= Aotearoa Music Award for Best Alternative Artist =

Annual New Zealand music award

Te Manu Taki Whanokē o te Tau Best Alternative Artist
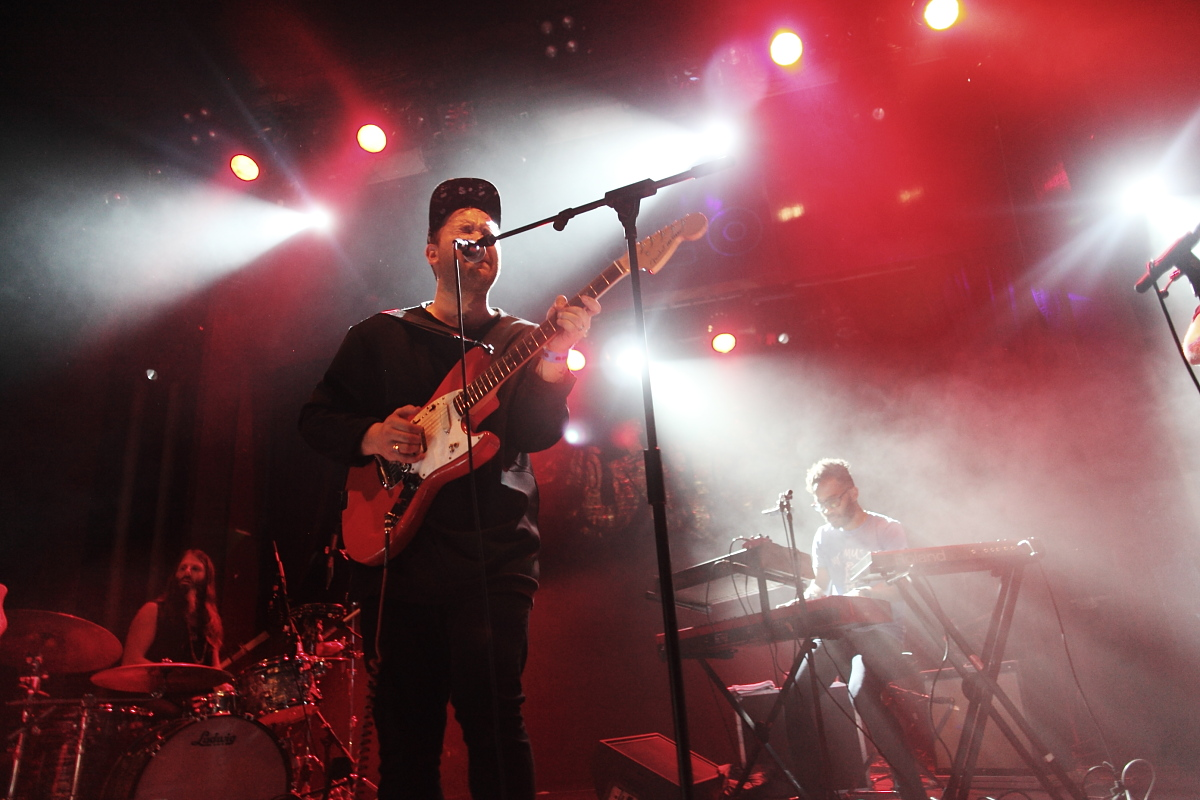
- Unknown Mortal Orchestra have won the award three times.
- Awarded for: Excellence in New Zealand Music
- Presented by: Recorded Music NZ
- First award: 2011
- Currently held by: Jim Nothing – Grey Eyes, Grey Lynn

Highlights
- Most wins: Unknown Mortal Orchestra (3)
- Most nominations: Unknown Mortal Orchestra (4)

Best Alternative Artist (Māori: Te Manu Taki Whanokē o te Tau) is an Aotearoa Music Award that honours New Zealand artists for outstanding alternative recordings.

The inaugural award was presented as Best Alternative Album in 2011 to The Naked and Famous for their album Passive Me, Aggressive You. In 2017, the award was changed to Best Alternative Artist. The change was made to all the genre-specific awards, and was to reflect the changing release climate in which full albums had become less common. Under the new rules, an artist who has released "an album OR a minimum of five tracks" can be nominated.

Unknown Mortal Orchestra have the most awards with three wins, followed by The Beths who have won it twice.

== Recipients ==
=== Best Alternative Album (2010 - 2016) ===
Year	Winner	Album	Other finalists	Ref.
2011	The Naked and Famous	Passive Me, Aggressive You	Street Chant – Means; Die! Die! Die! – Form	
2012	Opossom	Electric Hawaii	Ladyhawke – Anxiety; Unknown Mortal Orchestra – Unknown Mortal Orchestra	
2013	Unknown Mortal Orchestra	II	Lawrence Arabia – The Sparrow; The Phoenix Foundation – Fandango	
2014	Tiny Ruins	Brightly Painted Ones	Liam Finn – The Nihilist; Grayson Gilmour – Infinite Life!	
2015	Unknown Mortal Orchestra	Multi-Love	Marlon Williams – Marlon Williams; She's So Rad – Tango	
2016	Lawrence Arabia	Absolute Truth	The Phoenix Foundation – Give Up Your Dreams; Silicon – Personal Computer	

=== Best Alternative Artist (2017 - present) ===
Year	Winner	Other finalists	Ref.
2017	Aldous Harding	Fazerdaze; Nadia Reid	
2018	Unknown Mortal Orchestra	Marlon Williams; Wax Chattels	
2019	The Beths – Future Me Hates Me	Aldous Harding – Designer; Tiny Ruins – Olympic Girls	
2020	The Beths	Mermaidens; Reb Fountain	
2021	Na Noise	Anthonie Tonnon; Wax Chattels	
2022	Vera Ellen	Ben Woods; Te Kaahu	
2023	No awards held		
2024	Princess Chelsea	Grecco Romank; Mermaidens	
2025	Jim Nothing – Grey Eyes, Grey Lynn	Louis Nicklin – The Big Sulk; Vera Ellen – heartbreak for jetlag	
