= New Zealand top 50 singles of 2024 =

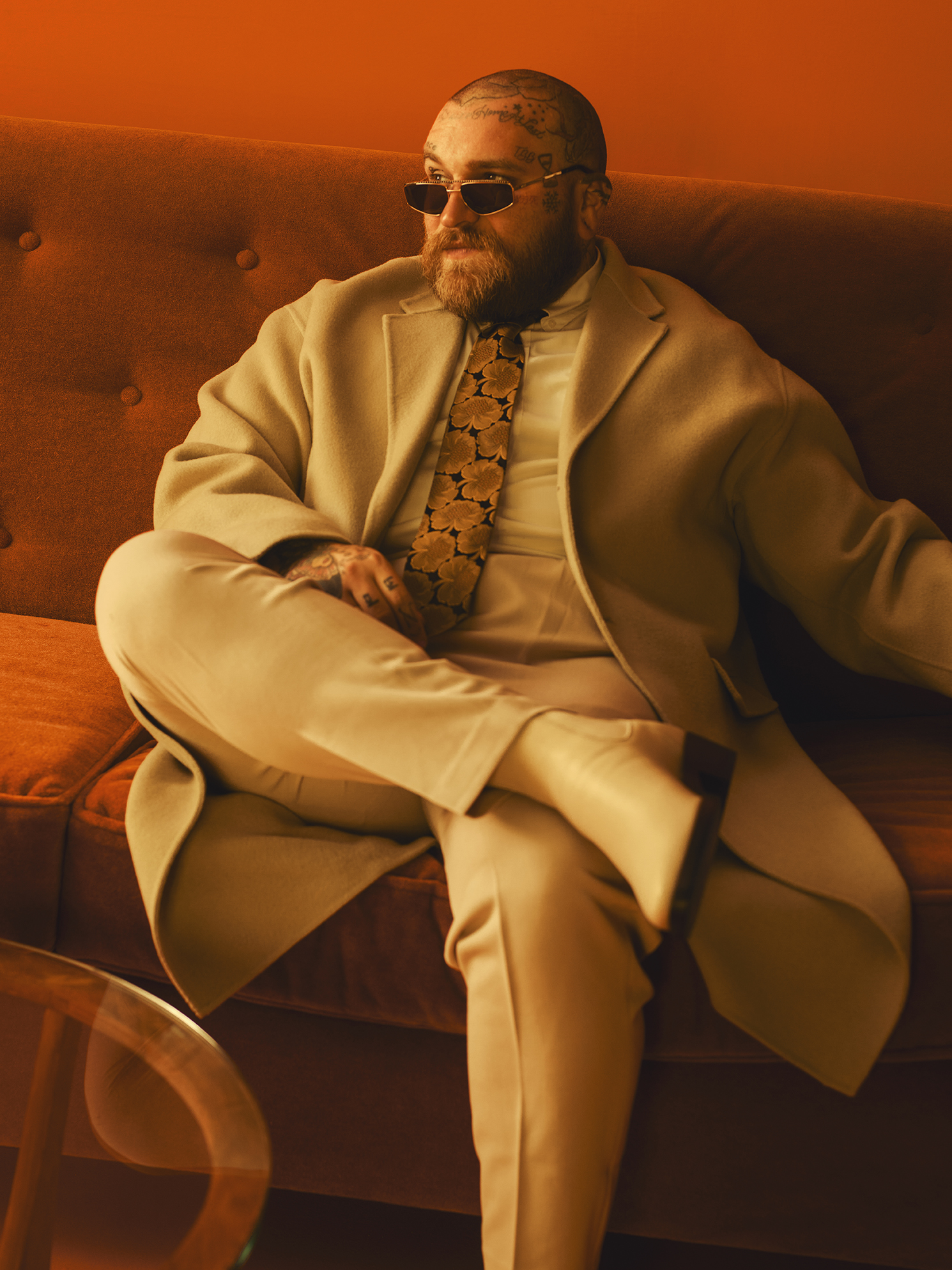
American singer Teddy Swims released the top performing song of the year, "Lose Control"

This is a list of the top-selling singles in New Zealand for 2024 from the Official New Zealand Music Chart's end-of-year chart, compiled by Recorded Music NZ. Recorded Music NZ also published 2024 lists for two sub-charts, the top 20 singles released by New Zealand artists, and the top 20 singles primarily performed in te reo Māori.

The Official 2024 End of Year Charts are based on sales and streaming data for all singles that were eligible to appear in the weekly Official Aotearoa Music Charts for some or all of 2024.

== Chart ==
Key
† – Song of New Zealand origin (Note: Whether or not a song is of New Zealand origin is determined by the Recorded Music NZ.)

Rank	Artist	Song
1	Teddy Swims	"Lose Control"
2	Benson Boone	"Beautiful Things"
3	Tommy Richman	"Million Dollar Baby"
4	Hozier	"Too Sweet"
5	Sabrina Carpenter	"Espresso"
6	Shaboozey	"A Bar Song (Tipsy)"
7	Billie Eilish	"Birds of a Feather"
8	Noah Kahan	"Stick Season"
9	Kendrick Lamar	"Not Like Us"
10	Sabrina Carpenter	"Please Please Please"
11	Post Malone feat. Morgan Wallen	"I Had Some Help"
12	YG Marley	"Praise Jah in the Moonlight"
13	Jack Harlow	"Lovin On Me"
14	Chappell Roan	"Good Luck Babe"
15	Dasha	"Austin (Boots Stop Workin')"
16	Taylor Swift	"Cruel Summer"
17	Zach Bryan	"Something in the Orange"
18	Zach Bryan feat. Kacey Musgraves	"I Remember Everything"
19	CYRIL	"Stumblin' In"
20	Djo	"End of Beginning"
21	Tate McRae	"Greedy"
22	Lady Gaga and Bruno Mars	"Die with a Smile"
23	SZA	"Snooze"
24	Michael Marcagi	"Scared to Start"
25	Ariana Grande	"We Can't Be Friends (Wait for Your Love"
26	SZA	"Saturn"
27	Fred Again... and Baby Keem	"Leavemealone"
28	Corrella	"Blue Eyed Māori"
29	Tyla	"Water"
30	Artemas	"I Like the Way You Kiss Me"
31	Eminem	"Houdini"
32	Beyoncé	"Texas Hold 'Em"
33	Benson Boone	"Slow It Down"
34	Taylor Swift feat. Post Malone	"Fortnight"
35	Miley Cyrus	"Flowers"
36	Myles Smith	"Stargazing"
37	Morgan Wallen	"Last Night"
38	cassö, RAYE and D-Block Europe	"Prada"
39	Natasha Bedingfield	"Unwritten"
40	Future and Metro Boomin feat. Kendrick Lamar	"Like That"
41	Billie Eilish	"Wildflower"
42	Sabrina Carpenter	"Taste"
43	Doja Cat	"Paint The Town Red"
44	Luke Combs	"Fast Car"
45	Good Neighbours	"Home"
46	SZA	"Kill Bill"
47	Billie Eilish	"Lunch"
48	Mark Ambor	"Belong Together"
49	Teddy Swims	"The Door"
50	Flo Milli	"Never Lose Me"

== Top 20 singles by New Zealand artists ==
Rank	Artist	Song
1	Corrella	"Blue Eyed Māori"
2	L.A.B.	"Casanova"
3	L.A.B.	"Take It Away"
4	Stan Walker	"Māori Ki Te Ao"
5	Stan Walker	"I Am"
6	Hori Shaw	"Back In My Arms"
7	DJ Noiz and Mikey Mayz	"Still The One"
8	Hori Shaw	"Country Roads"
9	Myshaan	"Sway"
10	Hori Shaw feat. Classick J	"Paradise 35"
11	House of Sheem	"Have You Ever Seen the Rain"
12	L.A.B.	"Oh No (Pt. 2)"
13	Six60	"Before You Leave"
14	L.A.B.	"Ocean Demon"
15	Son & Water	"Keep That Smile"
16	L.A.B.	"Give Me That Feeling"
17	Sons of Zion	"One Night"
18	The Ladz of the Mist	"Natural High"
19	Coterie feat. Six60	"Always Beside You"
20	No Cigar	"Concubine"

== Top 20 singles sung in te reo Māori ==
Rank	Artist	Song
1	Stan Walker	"Māori Ki Te Ao"
2	TAWAZ	"He Aho"
3	Corrella	"Raumati"
4	Tuari Brothers	"Whakatau Wairua"
5	Papa's Pack	"Muriwhenua Wiata"
6	Origin Roots Aotearoa (O.R.A.)	"Ko Tāua"
7	TAWAZ and Mohi Allen	"Tātarakihi"
8	Coterie	"Purea (Cool It Down)"
9	Jackson Owens	"Purotu"
10	Te Tira Waiata o Te Pukawai	"Tōku Reo Tōku Ohooho"
11	The Black Seeds	"Koia Ko Koe (So True)"
12	Stan Walker	"Ki Taku Awa"
13	Origin Roots Aotearoa (O.R.A.)	"Nui Te Aroha"
14	KORA	"Kia Arohatia Tātou"
15	Casual Healing	"Mauri Tau"
16	Jordyn with a Why	"Raumati"
17	Mikey Dam, TAWAZ and Jackson Owens	"Ai, E Kō"
18	Jaya	"Me He Korokoro Tui"
19	Corrella	"Ko Au (I Am Me)"
20	Valkyrie feat. Pere Wihongi	"Te Aroha Ki A Koe"
