= Aotearoa Music Award for Best Māori Artist =

Annual New Zealand music award

Best Māori Artist (Māori: Te Manu Taki Māori o te Tau) is an Aotearoa Music Award that honours New Zealand music artists for outstanding recordings which reflect a unique Māori identity and/or are an expression of an artist's Māori culture. The nominated work can be in te reo Māori, English or be bilingual. The award is presented annually at the New Zealand Music Awards where the winner receives a Tui trophy.

The award was established in 1992 as Best Māori Album, however it was soon criticised for being too broad. The category was withdrawn in 1994 and 1995, and relaunched in 1996 as two separate categories: Best Mana Māori Album (for albums from Māori artists) and Best Mana Reo Album (for Māori language albums). From 2004, the award reverted to only the Best Māori Album category. In 2017 the award was changed to Best Māori Artist with the entry criteria changed to require either an album or a minimum of five single releases in the eligibility period. The award was not presented in 2005, 2009 and 2010 due to insufficient entries.

At the 2015 ceremony, the presentation of the Best Māori Album award was not shown in the live broadcast, as the network cut to an ad break, resulting in complaints from viewers and musicians.

== Recipients ==
=== Best Māori Album (1992 to 1993) ===
Year	Winner	Album	Other finalists	Ref.
1992	Moana and the Moahunters	AEIOU	John Rowles – E Te Tamaiti; The Whanau Funksters – Funky Whanau Feeling	
1993	Southside of Bombay	All Across the World	Hinewehi Mohi – Kia U; Te Hei O Tahoka – Ahorangi Genesis	
1994	No award presented			
1995	No award presented			

=== Best Mana Māori Album & Best Reo Māori Album (1996 to 2003) ===
Year	Award	Winner	Album	Other finalists	Ref.
1996	Best Mana Māori Album	Southside of Bombay with Mina Ripia	"Kia Mau"	Maree Sheehan – "Past to Present"; Moana and the Moahunters – "Give it Up Now"; Ruia – "Ka Tangi te Tiitii Ka Tangi to Kaakaa"	
1996	Best Mana Reo Album	Southside of Bombay with Mina Ripia	"Kia Mau"	Ruia – "Ka Tangi te Tiitii Ka Tangi te Kaakaa"; Moana and the Moahunters – "Akona Te Reo '95"	
1997	Best Mana Māori Album	Emma Paki	Oxygen of Love	DLT – The True School; Dam Native – "Behold My Kool Style"	
1997	Best Mana Reo Album	St Joseph's Māori Girls' College	He Koha Waiata – A Gift of Song	Te Kura Tuatahi Me Te Ropu Kapahaka O Ranana – Te Wainui A Rua; Turakina Māori Girls College – Mana Wahine	
1998	Best Mana Māori Album	Te Matapihi	Te Matapihi	Māori Volcanics – Kia Ora; Dam Native – Kaupapa Driven Rhymes Uplifted	
1998	Best Mana Reo Album	St Joseph's Māori Girls' College	E Hine	The Willie Matthews Quartet – A Treasury of Māori Songs; Nga Kura O Hananah – Nga Kura O Hananah	
1999	Best Mana Māori Album	Moana and the Moahunters	Rua	Hori Chapman – Toku Reo; Waihirere Māori Club – Waihirere: National Champions; Ngati Rangiwewehi – Wairua: Spirit of Ngati Rangiwewehi	
1999	Best Mana Reo Album	Traditional Waiata	He Waiata Onemata (Songs From the Past)	Ngati Rangiwewehi – Wairua: Spirit of Ngati Rangiwewehi; Moana and the Moahunters – Rua; Waihirere Māori Club – Waihirere National Champions	
2000	Best Mana Māori Album	Southside of Bombay	Live In Aotearoa	Maisey Rika – 20 Favourite Māori Songs; Hato Paora College – Hato Paora: 50 Years On	
2000	Best Mana Reo Album	Iwi	Iwi	Maisey Rika – 20 Favourite Māori Songs; Hato Paora College – Hato Paora: 50 Years On; He Taonga Reo – Tahi/Rua	
2001	Best Mana Māori Album	Wai	Wai 100%	Ruia & Ranea – Whare Māori; Big Belly Woman – Dance with the Wind	
2001	Best Mana Reo Album	Whirimako Black	Shrouded in The Mist/Hinepukohurangi	Ruia & Ranea – Whare Māori; Wai – Wai 100%	
2002	Best Mana Māori Album	Rangiatea	Rangiatea Concert Party	Ruia and Ranea – Waiata of Bob Marley; Te Ati Kimihia – Te Ati Kimihia and the Children of Tane	
2002	Best Mana Reo Album	Ruia and Ranea	Waiata of Bob Marley	Brannigan Kaa – Taputapu; T-Sistaz – Whakamanahia	
2003	Best Mana Māori Album	Upper Hutt Posse	Te Reo Māori Remixes	Soul Paua – Pohewa; Mahinarangi Tocker – Hei Ha	
2003	Best Mana Reo Album	Ngahiwi Apanui	E Tau Nei	Hareruia Aperama – Waiata of Bob Marley Vol 2; Adam Whauwhau – He Hua O Roto	

=== Best Māori Album (2004 to 2016) ===
Year	Winner	Album	Other finalists	Ref.
2004	Ruia	Hawaiki	Hirini Melbourne, Richard Nunns and Aroha Yates-Smith – Te Hekenga-a-rangi; Whirimako Black – Tangihaku	
2005	No award presented			
2006	Te Reotakiwa Dunn	Te Reotakiwa Dunn	Mahara Tocker – Hurricane's Eye; Rodger Cunningham – Toto	
2007	Richard Nunns & Hirini Melbourne	Te Whaiao: Te Ku Te Whe Remixed	Adam Whauwhau – Tukuna Mai; Toi Hautu – Na Te Atua	
2008	Ruia	12:24 Tekau Ma Rua – Rua Tekau Ma Wha	Moana and the Tribe – Wha; Tiki Taane – Past, Present, Future	
2009	No award presented			
2010	No award presented			
2011	Tiki Taane	In the World of Light	Miss Black – Black Light; Wai – Ora	
2012	Ria Hall	Ria Hall	Upper Hutt Posse – Declaration of Resistance; Whirimako Black and Richard Nunns – Te More	
2013	Maisey Rika	Whitiora	Kirsten Te Rito – Te Rito; Ngatapa Black – I Muri Ahiahi	
2014	Rob Ruha	Tiki Tapu	House of Shem – Harmony; Tama Waipara – Fill up the Silence	
2015	Ranea	Tihei Mauri Ora	Whaia and the Mahician – Whaia; Moana and the Tribe – Rima	
2016	Rob Ruha	Pumau	Kirsten Te Rito – Aiotanga; Dennis Marsh – Māori Songbook 2	

=== Best Māori Artist (2017 to present) ===
Year	Winner	Other finalists	Ref.
2017	Teeks	Alien Weaponry; Maisey Rika	
2018	Troy Kingi	Alien Weaponry; Katchafire	
2019	Troy Kingi & The Upperclass – Holy Colony Burning Acres	Louis Baker – Open; Rei – The Bridge	
2020	Maimoa – Rongomaiwhiti	Ria Hall – Manawa Wera; Stan Walker	
2021	Teeks	Mara TK; Troy Kingi	
2022	Ka Hao – Ka Hao: One Tira / One Voice	Rob Ruha – Preservation of Scenery; Stan Walker – Te Arohanui	
2023	No awards held		
2024	TAWAZ	Jordyn with a Why; MOHI; Rei; Stan Walker; Tuari Brothers	
2025	Stan Walker	Anna Coddington – Te Whakamiha; Corrella – Skeletons; Jordyn with a Why – Hibiscus Moon, Love & Justice; MOHI; TAWAZ	
