= 2025 Waiata Māori Music Awards =

- Date: 14 November 2025
- Venue: Toitoi: Hawke's Bay Arts and Events Centre; Hastings, New Zealand
- Website: waiatamaoriawards.co.nz

Television/radio coverage
- Network: Radio New Zealand

The 2025 Waiata Music Awards were the 18th of the annual ceremony that celebrates Māori musicians and performers. The awards were held on 14 November, 2025 at Toitoi: Hawke's Bay Arts and Events Centre in Hastings, New Zealand, and were broadcast online by Radio New Zealand.

Finalists for the awards were announced on 23 October, 2025.

Additionally, producer Wyn Anania received the Iconic Contribution to Music Industry Award, and musician Toni Huata received the Lifetime Achievement Award.

== Nominees and winners ==
Winners are listed first, highlighted in boldface, and indicated with a double dagger (‡).

Best Māori Female Solo Artist Te Tohu Manu Tioriori Wahine Autaia	Best Māori Male Solo Artist Te Tohu Manu Tioriori Tāne Autaia
**Makayla**‡; Huia; Paige	**Haami**‡; Kings; Shane Walker
Best Māori Songwriter Te Tohi o Te Kaitito Waiata Māori Autaia	Best Māori Group Te Tohu Rōpū Māori Autaia
**Tuari Brothers**‡; Haami; TAWAZ	**Tuari Brothers‡**; Corrella; Coterie
Best single by a Māori Artist Te Tohu o Te Waiata Māori Hira	Best Māori Pop Album Te Tohu kaipūoru Aratini Māori Autaia
**TAWAZ**‡; Haami; Tuari Brothers	**Corrella** – **Skeletons**‡; Black Comet – Episode 1: Looking for a New Planet; Rei – Moisturise and Decolonise
Best Hip Hop and RnB Album Te Tohu Kaipūoru Māori noho Tāone Autaia	Best Roots Reggae Album Te Manu Taki Arotini o te Tau
**Tipene – Heritage Trail 2 The Partnership**‡; Rei – Moisturise and Decolonise; Kings - Raplist	**Corrella** – **Skeletons**‡; Brutha Rodz meets Israel Star at the foothills of Ruapehu; NLC – Roots Foundation
Best Music Video Te Tohu Ataata Autaia	Emerging Artist Under 25 Te Tohu Kaipūoru Rangatahi Hou
**Tipene – Tū**‡; Rawhitiroa – "Whakarongo Rā"; TAWAZ – "Mānawa Maiea Matariki"	**Ngatainui Ratu**‡
**Tipene – Tū**‡; Rawhitiroa – "Whakarongo Rā"; TAWAZ – "Mānawa Maiea Matariki"	Emerging Artist Over 25 Te Tohu Kaipūoru Pakeke Hou
**Tipene – Tū**‡; Rawhitiroa – "Whakarongo Rā"; TAWAZ – "Mānawa Maiea Matariki"	**Shane Walker** and **Rawhitiroa**‡
Radio Airplay Song of the Year in Te Reo Māori Te Tohu Kōpae Irirangi Kaipūoru Māori o te Tau	Radio Airplay Song of the Year Tohu Kōpae Irirangi Kaipūoru Reo Māori o te Tau
**TAWAZ**‡	**Hori Shaw**‡
