= 2021 Aotearoa Music Awards =

New Zealand music award ceremony

- Awarded for: Excellence in New Zealand music
- Date: 17 December 2021
- Location: Aotea Centre, Auckland, New Zealand
- Hosted by: Hayley Sproull; Stan Walker
- Website: Official website

Television/radio coverage
- Network: TVNZ 2 TVNZ+

The 2021 Aotearoa Music Awards was the 55th holding of the annual ceremony featuring awards for musical recording artists based in or originating from New Zealand. The ceremony took place on 17 December 2021 at the Aotea Centre in Auckland and was hosted by Hayley Sproull and Stan Walker. It was broadcast live on TVNZ 2 and TVNZ+.

The finalists were announced on 11 November 2021. Troy Kingi received the most nominations with six, followed by Teeks with five and L.A.B. with four. The latter were the night's biggest winners and won all the four nominations, including Album of the Year for L.A.B. IV and Single of the Year for "Why Oh Why", followed by Teeks with three.

== Nominees and winners ==
Winners are listed first, highlighted in boldface, and indicated with a double dagger (‡).

Album of the Year (Te Pukaemi o te Tau)	Single of the Year (Te Waiata Tōtahi o te Tau)
**L.A.B. IV – L.A.B.**‡; Dreamers Are Waiting – Crowded House; Friend Ship – The Phoenix Foundation; The Ghost of Freddie Cesar – Troy Kingi; Hey U X – Benee; Something to Feel – Teeks	**"Why Oh Why" – L.A.B.**‡; "All She Wrote" – Six60; "Dance Away These Days" – Harper Finn; "Remember Me" – Teeks; "Sleep (Slumber)" – Troy Kingi; "Solar Power" – Lorde
Best Solo Artist (Te Kaipuoro Takitahi Toa)	Best Māori Artist (Te Māngai Pāho Te Kaipuoro Māori Toa)
**Teeks**‡; Anna Coddington; Benee; Troy Kingi	**Teeks**‡; Mara TK; Troy Kingi
Best Group (Te Roopu Toa)	Breakthrough Artist of the Year (Te Kaituhura Puoro Toa o te Tau)
**L.A.B.**‡; Crowded House; The Phoenix Foundation; Shapeshifter	**Harper Finn**‡; Foley; Muroki; Niko Walters
Best Pop Artist (Te Kaipuoro Arotini Toa)	Best Alternative Artist (Te Kaipuoro Manohi Toa)
**Benee**‡; Foley; LA Women	**Na Noise**‡; Anthonie Tonnon; Wax Chattels
Best Soul/RnB Artist (Te Kaipuoro Awe Toa)	Best Hip Hop Artist (Te Kaipuoro Hipihope Toa)
**Teeks**‡; Mara TK; Troy Kingi	**Team Dynamite**‡; Diggy Dupè; SWIDT
Best Roots Artist (Te Kaipuoro Taketake Toa)	Te Māngai Pāho Mana Reo Award
**L.A.B.**‡; Grove Roots; Tomorrow People	**Te Nūtube**‡; Rei; The Nudge & Troy Kingi
Best Electronic Artist (Te Kaipuoro Tāhiko Toa)	Best Rock Artist (Te Kaipuoro Rakapioi Toa)
**Paige Julia**‡; Shapeshifter; Sola Rosa	**Dead Favours**‡; Ekko Park; Mako Road
Best Classical Artist (Te Kaipuoro Inamata Toa)
**Claire Cowan**‡; Justin DeHart; Tony Yan Tong Chen

=== Additional awards ===
The following awards were also presented:

Best Country Artist (Te Kaipuoro Tuawhenua Toa)	Best Folk Artist (Te Kaipuoro Taketake Toa)
**Tami Neilson – Chickaboom!**‡; Jody Direen – Smokin' Ashes; Ryan Fisherman – Vibe	**Tattletale Saints – Dancing Under the Dogwoods**‡; Darren Watson – Getting Sober for the End Of The World; You, Me, Everybody – You, Me, Everybody
Best Children's Music Artist (Te Kaipuoro Waiata Tamariki Toa)	Best Jazz Artist (Te Kaipuoro Tautito Toa)
**fleaBITE – Snakes Alive**‡; Chris Lam Sam – Chris Lam Sam's Silly Funny Songs For Kids!; Music with Michal – Can You Make Music?	**The Jac – A Gathering**‡; Lucien Johnson – Wax//Wane; Unwind – Saffron

=== Artisan awards ===
Best Album Artwork (Te Kaipuoro Tāhiko Toa)	Best Music Video Content (Te Kiko Puoro Ataata Toa)
**Amanda Cheng for Clot by Wax Chattels**‡; Frances Carter for Something to Feel by Teeks; Jaime Robertson, Matthias Heidrich, and Andrew Spraggon for Chasing the Sun by Sola Rosa	**Alexander Gander for "No One Knows" by Georgia Lines**‡; Anahera Parata for "Brighter Day" by Louis Baker
Best Producer (Te Kaiwhakaputa Toa)	Best Engineer (Te Kaipukaha Toa)
**Delaney Davidson and Jol Mulholland for Black Sea Golden Ladder by Troy Kingi**‡; Harry Huavi for Respect the Process by Team Dynamite; Joel Little for "Part of Me" by Noah Kahan; "Miracles" by Jarryd James; "Working" by Tate McRae and Khalid; "Follow You" by Imagine Dragons; "Missing Piece" by Vance Joy	**Jol Mulholland for Black Sea Golden Ladder by Troy Kingi**‡; Lee Prebble and Ara Adams-Tamatea for L.A.B. IV by L.A.B.; Simon Gooding for Something to Feel by Teeks
Music Teacher of the Year (Kaiārahi Puoro o te Tau)	Manager of the Year (Kaiwhakahaere Puoro o te Tau)
**Jane Egan – Gisborne Girls' High School**‡; Andrea Rabin – Papakura High School; Jeni Little – Hobsonville Point Secondary School	**Nicole Thomas and Paula Yeoman (NicNak Media Ltd) – Theia, Chores, Paige, Abby Wolfe, and Nganeko**‡; Cushla Aston (Aston Road) – Louis Baker; Lorraine Barry (Lorraine Barry Management) – Dave Dobbyn, Tom Scott, Team Dynamite, Aaradhna, and YGB

=== Special awards ===
People's Choice Award (Te Kōwhiri o te Nuinga)	New Zealand Music Hall of Fame (Te Whare Taonga Puoro o Aotearoa)
**Te Nūtube**‡	**Annie Crummer**‡; **Debbie Harwood**‡; **Dianne Swann**‡; **Margaret Urlich**‡; **Kim Willoughby**‡
Highest Selling Artist (Te Toa Hoko Teitei)	Radio Airplay Record of the Year (Te Rikoata Marakerake o te Tau)
**Six60**‡	**"Fade Away" – Six60**‡
