= Alfred L. Bright =

American artist (1940–2019)

- Born: January 9, 1940
- Died: October 28, 2019 (aged 79)
- Resting place
- Education: Youngstown State University; Kent State University
- Occupations: Artist, art educator

Alfred L. Bright (January 9, 1940 – October 28, 2019) was an American artist and art educator. He became "the first African American full-time faculty member" at his alma mater, Youngstown State University, and he was the founder and director of its Africana Studies program from 1970 to 1987. He had more than 100 solo art exhibits in his lifetime and received numerous local, state and national awards, including the Rev. Dr. Martin Luther King Jr. Diversity Award for Lifetime Achievement for his leadership and service to the Youngstown, Ohio, community in 2011. His work can be seen in many museums, including the Butler Institute of American Art and the Canton Museum of Art.

Bright was portrayed as an 11-year old child in the 2023 film Origin, directed by Ava DuVernay, in which he was excluded from joining his Little League teammates in a public swimming pool because of his race, a symbol of the trauma of the Jim Crow caste system in the US of the 1950s. As Bright remembered it he looked into the faces of each of his former teammates and "didn't scowl at them. I didn't say anything to them. I just looked into their eyes. And that was enough said. They knew they had done something wrong."
