= Paige (singer) =

New Zealand singer-songwriter (born 1997)

- Born: Paige Tapara; July 10, 1997 (age 29)
- Genre: Pop
- Label: Sony Music New Zealand

Paige Tapara (born 10 July 1997), better known as Paige, is a singer-songwriter from South Auckland, New Zealand.

== Early life and career ==
Paige was born 10 July 1997 and grew up in Clarks Beach, New Zealand. She is Māori (Ngāti Maniapoto and Ngāti Tūwharetoa).

Paige's career first started at 12 years old, when she began uploading song covers onto YouTube. Using GarageBand, she recorded and self-released her first EP, On My Own, in 2017.

In 2020, she was signed to Sony Music after a video of hers was shared on Instagram by American pop-star Billie Eilish. Her second EP, Always Growing, was released later that year, and went platinum in South Korea in 2023.

She released her first studio album, King Clown, in 2023, and her third EP, paigespace, in late-2025.

== Personal life ==
Paige is queer, but has resisted labeling her sexuality, saying "I just like people". Her single "Waves", which she began writing in 2017, reflects on her struggles with her sexuality as a 12 year old, developing feelings for another girl.

== Discography ==
=== EPs ===
- On My Own (2017)
- Always Growing (2020)
- paigespace (2025)

=== Albums ===
- King Clown (2023)

=== Singles ===
Title	Year	Peak chart positions			Album
Title	Year	NZ Hot 40	Hot 20 Aotearoa	Top 10 Te Reo Māori	Album
"Bloom"	2019	20	3	—	Always Growing
"Too Much to H8"	2020	29	7	—	Always Growing
"Yellow"	2020	26	2	—	Always Growing
"Cold Blooded"	2020	30	5	—	Always Growing
"Waves"	2020	17	1	—	Always Growing
"Make Room"	2020	31	5	—	Always Growing
"Hit N Run"	2020	—	17	—	Always Growing
"Goodbye"	2021	12	3	—	Non-album singles
"Taianiwha (Waves)"	2021	38	13	8	Non-album singles
"I Hope You Knew"	2022	35	5	—	Non-album singles
"To Aroha"	2022	32	9	7	Non-album singles
"Loyalty"	2022	27	7	—	Non-album singles
"California"	2023	—	10	—	King Clown
"Dance With You"	2023	—	3	—	King Clown
"Aquarian"	2023	—	9	—	King Clown
"Carousel"	2023	—	2	—	King Clown
"twenties"	2025	23	3	—	paigespace
"no hoping"	2025	15	15	—	paigespace
"tragedy"	2025	—	—	—	paigespace
"warmest gift"	2025			—	
"the way you are"	2026			—	

== Awards and nominations ==
Year	Award	Work(s) Nominated	Category	Result	Ref.
2020	Aotearoa Music Awards	Always Growing	Best Pop Artist	Nominated	
2020	Aotearoa Music Awards	Always Growing	Breakthrough Artist	Nominated	
2021	Waiata Māori Awards	—	Best Māori Female Solo Artist	Won	
2024	Aotearoa Music Awards	King Clown	Album of the Year	Nominated	
2024	Aotearoa Music Awards	—	Best Pop Artist	Nominated	
2024	Aotearoa Music Awards	—	People's Choice	Nominated	
2024	Waiata Māori Music Awards	—	Best Māori Female Solo Artist	Nominated	
2025	Waiata Māori Music Awards	—	Best Māori Female Solo Artist	Nominated	
2026	Aotearoa Music Awards	"twenties"	Single of the Year	Nominated	
