= Emily Yancy =

American actress (born 1939)

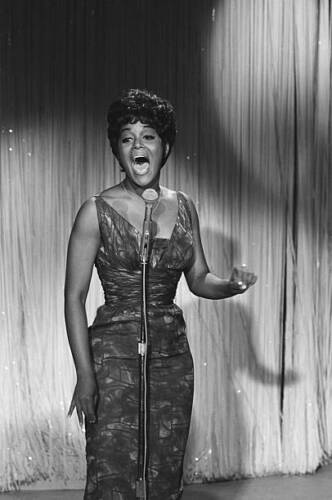
- Yancy performing during The Tonight Show Starring Johnny Carson (1962)
- Born: April 28, 1939 (age 86); New York City, New York, U.S.
- Occupation: Actress
- Years active: 1963–present

Emily Yancy (born April 28, 1939) is an American actress and singer. She began her acting career appearing on Broadway as Irene Molloy in the 1967 all-black version of Hello, Dolly! opposite Cab Calloway. She later performed on musicals Don't Bother Me, I Can't Cope, Your Own Thing, 1600 Pennsylvania Avenue and Man of La Mancha.

Of African American heritage, Yancy was born and raised in New York City and began working as a model before acting and singing. In 1965, she recorded her debut studio album titled Yancy. Yancy made her screen debut playing minor role in the 1968 comedy film What's So Bad About Feeling Good?. She later appeared in the comedy-drama Tell Me That You Love Me, Junie Moon (1970), and in the blaxploitation films Cotton Comes to Harlem (1970) and Blacula (1972). On television, Yancy guest-starred in a more than 30 shows, including Love, American Style, Sanford and Son, Starsky & Hutch, Diff'rent Strokes, Picket Fences, The Practice, Frasier, How to Get Away with Murder and Criminal Minds.

In 2018, Yancy played Gayla, the housekeeper of Patricia Clarkson's character, in the HBO miniseries, Sharp Objects. In 2023, she appeared in the biographical drama film, Origin playing the role of Isabel Wilkerson's mother.

== Filmography ==
- What's So Bad About Feeling Good? (1968) as Sybil
- Tell Me That You Love Me, Junie Moon (1970) as Solana
- Cotton Comes to Harlem (1970) as Mabel
- Second Chance (1972) as Stella Hill
- Blacula (1972) as Nancy
- Poor Devil (1973) as Chelsea
- The Sword and the Sorcerer (1982) as Ban Urlu
- The Abyss (1989) as Reporter
- Heat Wave (1990) as Guidance Counselor
- Nine Months (1995) as Dr. Thatcher
- Jasper, Texas (2003) as Stella Byrd
- Origin (2023) as Ruby Wilkerson
