= Something to Feel =

2021 album by Teeks

Studio album by Teeks
- Released: 26 March 2021
- Genre: Soul
- Length: 50:00
- Label: Sony
- Producers: Simon Gooding, Teeks

Teeks chronology
II (2020)	Something to Feel (2021)	Lovers Comet (2026)

Singles from Something to Feel
- 1. "Without You" Released: 14 August 2020; 2. "Remember Me" Released: 30 October 2020; 3. "First Time" Released: 5 March 2021; 4. "Oil & Water" Released: 5 November 2021

Something to Feel is the debut studio album by New Zealand soul musician Teeks. Released in three parts, first as the extended plays I and II in 2020, the album was released in full in March 2021. The album was a commercial success, debuting at number one on the Official New Zealand Music Chart. In November 2021, the album was re-released, featuring the single "Oil & Water".

== Production ==
The album's was written as an encouragement for people to express their emotions, especially men who had been taught by society to repress feelings. Teeks believed it was important to break up the album into smaller pieces, to ensure each song on the record had exposure. The first third, released as the extended play I, was thought of by Teeks as the invitation to the project, inviting people into the story of the album. Part two, released as the EP II, was thought of by Teeks as listeners "surrendering to that process of vulnerability", and listeners allowing listeners to grow and mature. The final third, which Teeks referred to as "The Reveal, was an amalgamation of everything together in the project.

"Without You" written about Teeks " truly long for someone" for the first time. The song "Oil & Water" was written in 2017 as a part of APRA Songhubs, in collaboration with Dave Baxter from Avalanche City, Emily Warren and Josh Fountain, and was written expressing Teeks' processing what was happening in his life, and finding solace in the ocean.

== Release and promotion ==
The first single from the album, "Without You", was released in early August 2020. This was followed later in the month by the release of an extended play, I, which featured "Without You" along with three songs from Something to Feel: "Just for Tonight", "Waves" and "These Hands". This was followed by "Remember Me" in October, which featured a music video directed by Teeks himself, and in November Teeks released II, a second EP featuring "Remember Me" and three more album tracks, "Into You", "If You Were Mine" and "Here Before".

Teeks toured New Zealand in December 2020, with the Invitation Tour. On 5 March, Teeks released "First Time", three weeks before the release of the album, and toured New Zealand in June. Teeks released the single "Oil & Water" on 5 November 2021. "Oil & Water" was bundled with a re-issued version of Something to Feel, released on digital and streaming platforms.

== Critical reception ==
Something to Feel was nominated for the Album of the Year award at the 2021 Aotearoa Music Awards. At the awards show, Teeks won the awards for Best Solo Artist, Best Soul/RnB Artist and Best Māori Artist.

== Track listing ==
Something to Feel track listing
No.	Title	Writer(s)	Length
1.	"Just for Tonight"	Josh Fountain; Te Karehana Toi	3:14
2.	"Waves"	Toi	4:09
3.	"These Hands"	Fountain; Toi	3:18
4.	"Without You"	Toi	3:45
5.	"Into You"	Hope Tuisaua; Toi	4:55
6.	"If You Were Mine"	M Basa; Toi	4:34
7.	"Here Before"	Toi	4:29
8.	"Remember Me"	Mahuia Bridgeman-Cooper; Nick Dow; Toi	4:43
9.	"Younger"	M Basa; Toi	3:48
10.	"Powers"	Dan Diggas; M Basa; Dow; Toi	3:38
11.	"Through It All"	Bridgeman-Cooper; Dow; Toi	4:17
12.	"First Time"	Devin Abrams; Toi	5:10
Total length:			50:00

Something to Feel re-release track listing
No.	Title	Writer(s)	Length
13.	"Oil & Water"	Dave Baxter; Emily Warren; Fountain; Toi	3:12
Total length:			53:12

== Credits and personnel ==
- Devin Abrams – songwriter (12)
- M Basa – piano (9), production support (9, 10), songwriter (6, 9–10)
- Moana-Roa Callaghan – backing vocals (5)
- Mahuia Bridgeman-Cooper – string arrangement (1, 3, 8, 11), songwriter (8, 11), violin (1, 3, 8, 11)
- Mike Booth – flugelhorn (2–3), trumpet (2–3)
- Tom Broome – drums (1, 3, 5, 8, 11–12), guitar (12)
- Dan Diggas – songwriter (10)
- Nick Dow – guitar (1), piano (4, 8, 10–11), songwriter (8, 10–11)
- Josh Fountain – additional production (1, 3, 5, 9, 12), songwriting (1, 3)
- John Gluyas – bass trombone (2–3), trombone (2–3)
- Simon Gooding – bass (9), guitar (9), mixing engineer, producer
- Anna Grahame – backing vocals (1, 3, 6, 8, 11–12)
- Godfrey De Grut – horn arrangement (2–3)
- Joe Harrop – viola (1, 3, 8, 11)
- Stuart Hawkes – mastering
- Jess Hindin – violin (1, 3, 8, 11)
- Marika Hodgson – bass (6, 12)
- Michael Howell – guitar (2, 5)
- Bella Kalolo – backing vocals (3–4, 6, 12)
- Abraham Kunin – guitar (1, 3, 6, 8, 12)
- Peter Leupolu – keyboards (3, 5–6, 12)
- Lewis McCallum – bass clarinet (2–3), flute (2–3), saxophone (2–3)
- Cass Mitchell – bass (1–3, 5, 8)
- Majic Paora – backing vocals (1, 3–4, 6, 8, 11–12)
- Eric Scholes – double bass (1, 3, 8, 11)
- Esther Stephens – backing vocals (3, 6, 12)
- Adam Tobeck – drums (6)
- Te Karehana Toi – guitar (7), producer, songwriter (1–13), vocals
- Hope Tuisaua – songwriting (5)
- Rachel Wells – cello (1, 3, 8, 11)

== Charts ==
=== Weekly charts ===
Weekly chart performance for Something to Feel
Chart (2021)	Peak position
New Zealand Albums (RMNZ)	1

=== Year-end charts ===
Year-end chart performance for Something to Feel
Chart (2021)	Position
New Zealand Albums (RMNZ)	33

== Certifications ==
Certifications for Something to Feel
Region	Certification	Certified units/sales
New Zealand (RMNZ)	2× Platinum	30,000^{‡}
^{‡} Sales+streaming figures based on certification alone.

== Release history ==
Release dates and formats for Something to Feel
Region	Date	Edition	Format(s)	Label(s)	Ref.
Various	26 March 2021	Standard	CD; vinyl; digital download; streaming	Sony	
Various	5 November 2021	Re-release	Digital download; streaming	Sony	
