= Mermaidens =

New Zealand indie rock band

- Origin: Wellington, New Zealand
- Years active: 2013–present
- Labels: Independent, Flying Nun
- Members: Abe Hollingsworth (drums); Gussie Larkin (vocals, guitar); Lily Paris West (vocals, bass)
- Website: mermaidens.co.nz

The Mermaidens are an indie rock band from Wellington, New Zealand. The band are made up of trio Abe Hollingsworth, Gussie Larkin, and Lily West.

Having met in high school, Larkin and West released an acoustic demo in 2013, before being joined by Hollingsworth. The band released a further two demos in 2014 – Bones and O – before releasing their debut album, Undergrowth, in 2016.

The band signed with Flying Nun Records for their next two albums; 2017's Perfect Body and 2019's Look Me in the Eye. Following Look Me in the Eye, the band parted with Flying Nun due to minor "frustrations with communication and not having a clear picture of finances."

In 2020, Larkin had planned to move to Berlin, but was forced to remain in New Zealand due to COVID-19 lockdowns. Stuck in their homes, the band took the opportunity to write new music. Once reunited, the band initially planned to just release a new single, "Soft Energy", and then an EP, then two EPs, before eventually deciding to record an entire album. Produced by The Phoenix Foundation's Samuel Flynn Scott, they independently released their self-titled fourth album, Mermaidens, in 2023.

== Discography ==
=== Albums and EPs ===
Title	Release	Peak chart position		Details
Title	Release	NZ Top 40	Aotearoa Top 20	Details
Demo (EP)	2013	—	—	Label: Independent
Bones (EP)	2014	—	—	Label: Independent
O (EP)	2014	—	—	Label: Independent
Undergrowth	2016	—	—	Label: Independent
Perfect Body	2017	28	7	Label: Flying Nun Records
Look Me In The Eye	2019	23	5	Label: Flying Nun Records
Mermaidens	2023	8	1	Label: Independent
"—" denotes a recording that did not chart or was not released in that territory.

=== Singles ===
Year	Title	Peak chart positions	Album
Year	Title	Hot 20 Aotearoa	Album
2015	"Seed"	—	Undergrowth
2016	"Undergrowth"	—	Undergrowth
2017	"Lizard"	—	Perfect Body
2017	"Satsuma"	—	Perfect Body
2017	"Sunstone (Onono Remix)"	—	Non-album single
2019	"You Maintain the Stain"	9	You Maintain the Stain / Cut It Open (split single)
2019	"Cut It Open"	16	You Maintain the Stain / Cut It Open (split single)
2019	"I Might Disappear"	17	Look Me In The Eye
2019	"Millenia"	15	Look Me In The Eye
2019	"She's Running"	—	Look Me In The Eye
2021	"Soft Energy"	13	Non-album single
2023	"I Like to Be Alone"	—	Mermaidens
2023	"Sister"	—	Mermaidens
2023	"Foolish"	—	Mermaidens

== Awards and nominations ==
Year	Award	Work(s) nominated	Category	Result	Ref.
2018	Taite Music Prize	Perfect Body	Taite Music Prize	Nominated	
2020	Aotearoa Music Awards	Look Me In The Eye	Best Alternative Artist	Nominated	
2020	Taite Music Prize	Look Me In The Eye	Taite Music Prize	Nominated	
2024	Aotearoa Music Awards	"I like to be alone"	Single of the Year	Nominated	
2024	Aotearoa Music Awards	Mermaidens	Best Group	Nominated	
2024	Aotearoa Music Awards	Mermaidens	Best Alternative Artist	Nominated	
2024	Aotearoa Music Awards	Mermaidens	People's Choice Award	Nominated	
2024	2024 Taite Music Prize	Mermaidens	Taite Music Prize	Nominated	
