= Origin (film) =

2023 film by Ava DuVernay

- Theatrical release poster
- Directed by: Ava DuVernay
- Written by: Ava DuVernay
- Produced by: Paul Garnes; Ava DuVernay
- Starring: Aunjanue Ellis-Taylor; Jon Bernthal; Vera Farmiga; Audra McDonald; Niecy Nash-Betts; Nick Offerman; Blair Underwood
- Cinematography: Matthew J. Lloyd
- Edited by: Spencer Averick
- Music by: Kris Bowers
- Production company: ARRAY Filmworks
- Distributed by: Neon
- Release dates: September 6, 2023 (Venice); December 8, 2023 (United States)
- Running time: 141 minutes
- Country: United States
- Language: English
- Budget: $38 million
- Box office: $4.8 million

Origin is a 2023 American biographical drama film written and directed by Ava DuVernay. It is based on the life of Isabel Wilkerson, played by Aunjanue Ellis-Taylor, as she writes the book Caste: The Origins of Our Discontents. Over the course of the film, Wilkerson travels throughout Germany, India, and the United States to research the caste systems in each country's history.

Origin premiered in competition at the 80th Venice International Film Festival on September 6, 2023, and began a limited theatrical release on December 8, 2023, by Neon.

== Plot ==
Grappling with tremendous personal tragedy, writer Isabel Wilkerson sets herself on a path of investigation and discovery as she writes Caste: The Origins of Our Discontents.

Wilkerson is consulted for her opinion after the killing of Trayvon Martin. She explores the idea of how race may not be the only determining factor in bigotry, since, e.g., in India, everyone may be of the same "race", but bigotry still occurs by caste. Similarly, although Jews of European descent may have been considered "white" in some parts of the world, in Nazi Germany they were defined as an inferior race to be exterminated. Wilkerson visits Germany and debates friends about how slavery compared with the Holocaust, "subjugation" versus "extermination".

Wilkerson chats at a cocktail party with two white women who are friendly, but do not fully understand her ideas of how different types of bigotry interrelate. Later, she works with one of the women on her book.

Intertwined with her ideas and discoveries, Wilkerson suffers the loss of her husband Brett, a white man; her elderly mother Ruby; and her cousin Marion. She often imagines herself speaking to those who have died, such as Al Bright, a black boy who was on a winning Little League team, but when the team was invited to a public swimming pool after their win, he was not allowed to enter the water.

Wilkerson looks in German archives and discovers that the Nazis used some of America's racist Jim Crow laws to develop some of their own racist laws; Hitler said he used the Americans' genocide of Native Americans as a guide for his own "Final Solution" extermination of Jewish people. The history of a couple in Nazi Germany is related, a male Gentile Nazi-party member who falls in love with a Jewish woman. They try to escape Germany, but she is caught and sent to a camp.

Also told is the story of married black researchers Allison Davis and Elizabeth Stubbs Davis, who work with a white couple, Burleigh and Mary R. Gardner, in an undercover project to better understand segregation in America, resulting in the 1941 book Deep South: A Social Anthropological Study of Caste and Class in a Southern City. The lynching of a black man is shown, with a white audience watching, some of them treating it as a show.

Wilkerson eventually decides to write a book about caste, a concept which solves some of the intellectual problems which mere consideration of race does not. She visits India and the home, now a historical site, of Dr. Ambedkar, who championed the rights of the Dalit ("untouchable") peoples, who are at the bottom of the caste system in India. Eventually, she speaks about her new book Caste on stage, and how it makes it easier to understand and fight bigotry.

Finally, an onscreen monologue details that Caste became a number one New York Times nonfiction best-seller around the time of the November 2020 U.S. presidential election, and spent ample time on the best-sellers list.

== Cast ==
- Aunjanue Ellis-Taylor as Isabel Wilkerson
- Jon Bernthal as Brett Hamilton, Isabel's husband
- Niecy Nash-Betts as Marion Wilkerson, Isabel's cousin
- Emily Yancy as Ruby Wilkerson, Isabel's mother
- Finn Wittrock as August Landmesser
- Victoria Pedretti as Irma Eckler
- Jasmine Cephas Jones as Elizabeth Davis
- Isha Blaaker as Allison Davis
- Vera Farmiga as Kate
- Audra McDonald as Miss Hale
- Connie Nielsen as Sabine
- Blair Underwood as Amari Selvan, Isabel's editor
- Nick Offerman as Dave the Plumber
- Stephanie March as Binky
- Myles Frost as Trayvon Martin
- Suraj Yengde, Ph.D. as himself
- Donna Mills as Mrs. Copeland
- Jordan Lloyd as a friend
- Franz Hartwig as Erich Kastner
- Daniel Lommatzsch as Joseph Goebbels
- Gaurav J. Pathania as B. R. Ambedkar

== Production ==
In October 2020, it was announced that Ava DuVernay would direct, write, and produce a film adaption of Caste: The Origins of Our Discontents for Netflix. After Netflix was no longer attached and other studios passed, DuVernay turned to financing from Ford Foundation, Emerson Collective and Pivotal Ventures, among others. In January 2023, Aunjanue Ellis-Taylor, Niecy Nash-Betts, Jon Bernthal, Vera Farmiga, Jasmine Cephas Jones, Nick Offerman and Connie Nielsen joined the cast of the film. In February 2023, Audra McDonald, Myles Frost, Blair Underwood, Victoria Pedretti, Isha Blaaker, Finn Wittrock, Leonardo Nam and Donna Mills joined the cast of the film.

Principal photography began in December 2022. The film ends with New Zealand musician Stan Walker's song "I Am", which is sung bilingually in English and Māori.

== Release ==
Origin had its world premiere at the 80th Venice International Film Festival on September 6, 2023, where it was in competition for the Golden Lion award, and received a standing ovation for more than eight minutes. Prior to this, Neon acquired distribution rights to the film. It also screened at the 2023 Toronto International Film Festival on September 11, 2023. It officially opened in a limited theatrical release on December 8, 2023, and later expanded to a wider release on January 19, 2024. The film was released in the UK by Black Bear Pictures on March 8, 2024.

Origin was released on digital platforms on March 12, 2024.

== Reception ==
=== Box office ===
Origin grossed $117,063 from two theaters during its limited opening weekend; the $58,531 per-venue average was the 4th-best of the year. In the first weekend of its wide release, the film made $826,235 from 125 theaters. It expanded to 664 theaters the following weekend, making $1.3 million.

=== Critical response ===
On the review aggregator website Rotten Tomatoes, 82% of 193 critics' reviews are positive, with an average rating of 7.4/10. The website's consensus reads: "A moving drama that's unafraid to ask big questions, Origin honors its source material with powerful performances in service of a deeply emotional story." Metacritic, which uses a weighted average, assigned the film a score of 75 out of 100, based on 45 critics, indicating "generally favorable" reviews. Test audiences gave the film a 91% overall positive score, with 81% saying they would definitely recommend the film.

Critics widely regarded Origin as "ambitious". Variety described the film as "a swirling tornado of ideas" and "a masterpiece", while RogerEbert.com considered the film to be "a dense, forceful masterwork." Reviews for Aunjanue Ellis-Taylor's performance were very positive, described as "virtuoso", "moving", and "stunning". Several critics directed particular praise to the scene where Isabel meets Miss Hale (played by Audra McDonald), which Richard Brody of The New Yorker described as "powerful" and Ann Hornaday of The Washington Post as the film's "most heartbreaking passage".

DuVernay's choice to film Origin with 16mm film was praised by RogerEbert.com, noting that the corresponding consistent visual look of the film emphasized the connectedness of Wilkerson's ideas. Manohla Dargis of The New York Times found the 911 calls by George Zimmerman (who shot and killed Trayvon Martin) in the film "excruciating", but noted that they intensify an urgency in the film "that feels very much like the sounding of an alarm." Variety praised the choice for the narrative to include moments where Isabel deals with personal adversity, noting that these details make Isabel's character "richer and more relatable" and share similarities with films by Agnès Varda.

The film's use of different styles divided critics. Brody considered the film's "fusion of history and subjectivity" to be an achievement, and thought the film's creative freedom was reminiscent to the modernist films of Ingmar Bergman and Alain Resnais. Hornaday thought that the film "seems to create a new cinematic language", and The A.V. Club thought that the film's experimentation with styles was admirable and demonstrated DuVernay's "visual dexterity". Writers at The Guardian and Polygon, however, thought the film would have been more effective as a documentary. The scene with the plumber wearing the MAGA hat also led to a difference in critical opinions; Hornaday for example though the scene was "a master class in unspoken expression" while RogerEbert.com considered it "too on the nose".

African-American film critic Candice Frederick of The Huffington Post wrote a less than enthusiastic review as she criticized the film for having no actual story, lack of subtlety in its message and, just like criticism of the book, pointed out already-understood issues without moving the conversation forward.

=== Accolades ===
Award	Date of ceremony	Category	Recipient(s)	Result	Ref.
AARP Movies for Grownups Awards	January 17, 2024	Best Actress	Aunjanue Ellis-Taylor	Nominated	
African-American Film Critics Association	2024	Top 10 Films	Origin	Runner-up	
African-American Film Critics Association	2024	Best Drama	Origin	Won	
African-American Film Critics Association	2024	Best Director	Ava DuVernay	Won	
African-American Film Critics Association	2024	Best Actress	Aunjanue Ellis-Taylor	Won	
Black Reel Awards	January 16, 2024	Outstanding Film	Ava DuVernay and Paul Garnes	Nominated	
Black Reel Awards	January 16, 2024	Outstanding Director	Ava DuVernay	Nominated	
Black Reel Awards	January 16, 2024	Outstanding Screenplay	Ava DuVernay	Nominated	
Black Reel Awards	January 16, 2024	Outstanding Lead Performance	Aunjanue Ellis-Taylor	Nominated	
Black Reel Awards	January 16, 2024	Outstanding Editing	Spencer Averick	Nominated	
Gotham Awards	27 November 2023	Outstanding Lead Performance	Aunjanue Ellis-Taylor	Nominated	
Hollywood Music in Media Awards	15 November 2023	Best Original Song – Feature Film	"I Am" – Stan Walker, Michael Fatkin, Vince Harder, Te Kanapu Anasta	Nominated	
NAACP Image Awards	March 16, 2024	Outstanding Motion Picture	Origin	Nominated	
NAACP Image Awards	March 16, 2024	Outstanding Directing in a Motion Picture	Ava DuVernay	Won	
NAACP Image Awards	March 16, 2024	Outstanding Actress in a Motion Picture	Aunjanue Ellis-Taylor	Nominated	
NAACP Image Awards	March 16, 2024	Outstanding Youth Performance in a Motion Picture	Lennox Simm	Nominated	
Venice International Film Festival	9 September 2023	Golden Lion	Ava DuVernay	Nominated	
Virginia Film Festival	29 October 2023	Audience Award – Narrative Feature	Origin	Won	
Virginia Film Festival	29 October 2023	Visionary Award	Ava DuVernay	Won	
Washington D.C. Area Film Critics Association Awards	10 December 2023	Best Adapted Screenplay	Ava DuVernay	Nominated	
Women Film Critics Circle	2023	Best Movie About Women	Origin	Nominated	
Women Film Critics Circle	2023	Best Movie About a Woman	Origin	Nominated	
Women Film Critics Circle	2023	Josephine Baker Award	Origin	Nominated	
Women Film Critics Circle	2023	Best Woman Storyteller	Ava DuVernay	Nominated	
Women Film Critics Circle	2023	Best Actress	Aunjanue Ellis-Taylor	Nominated	
Humanitas Prize	12 September 2024	Drama Feature Film	Ava DuVernay	Won	
