= I Am (Stan Walker song) =

2023 single by Stan Walker

"Stan Walker"

Single by Stan Walker
- Language: English, Māori
- Released: 27 November 2023
- Genre: Pop
- Length: 4:30
- Label: Sony Music Entertainment New Zealand
- Songwriters: Michael Fatkin; Stan Walker; Vince Harder; Te Kanapu Anasta
- Producer: Michael Fatkin

Stan Walker singles chronology
"Father's Eyes" (2023)	"Stan Walker" (2023)

Music video
- "I Am" on YouTube

"I Am" is a song by New Zealand musician Stan Walker. A bilingual ballad sung in English and Te Reo Māori, the song was written for the soundtrack of the Ava DuVernay film Origin (2023). The song debuted at number 19 on the New Zealand Singles chart, and was nominated for the Hollywood Music in Media Award for Best Original Song in a Feature Film at the 14th Hollywood Music in Media Awards.

== Background and composition ==
Director Ava DuVernay, while looking for an unexpected song for the closing credits of her 2023 film Origin, was shown Walker's cover of Kanye West's "Ultralight Beam" by her collaborator Paul Garnes. Feeling drawn to Walker's performance, DuVernay searched on Instagram for any mutual connections that she had with Walker, and asked New Zealand film producer Chelsea Winstanley to connect the two. The following day, DuVernay spoke to Walker on the phone, offering him the chance to perform the film's theme song.

Walker cowrote the song with Michael Fatkin, Vince Harder and Te Kanapu Anasta as a response to the content of the film, taking inspiration from the themes of ethnic identity reclamation and reconnection. Walker incorporated Te Reo Māori into the song's lyrics, feeling that this was important coming from his own perspective and own personal ethnic identity, and was surprised when DuVernay agreed to include the lyrics.

== Release and promotion ==
Walker first performed the song on 18 October 2023, at private screening of Origin in West Hollywood, where DuVernay announced that the song would be submitted as a contender for the Oscars.

The song was released as a single on 27 November 2023, and made its debut on US television on the talk show CBS Mornings on the same day. A music video for the song was released on 28 November 2023, shot in different locations around New Zealand. Walker co-directed the video alongside music video director Shae Sterling.

"I Am" is planned to be the leading single from an extended play to be released by Walker in early 2024.

== Critical reception ==
Russell Baillie of the New Zealand Listener reviewed the song positively, calling it a "plus-size anthem" and naming it as one of the Listener's songs of the week. The song was nominated for the Best Original Song – Feature Film award at the 14th Hollywood Music in Media Awards.

== Credits and personnel ==
Credits adapted from Tidal.

- Te Kanapu Anasta – songwriter
- Michael Fatkin – producer, songwriter
- Vince Harder – songwriter
- Stan Walker – songwriter, vocalist

== Charts ==
Chart performance for "I Am"
Chart (2023–2024)	Peak position
New Zealand (Recorded Music NZ)	19
US World Digital Songs (Billboard)	6

== Certification ==
Region	Certification	Certified units/sales
New Zealand (RMNZ)	Platinum	30,000^{‡}
^{‡} Sales+streaming figures based on certification alone.
