= Teeks =

New Zealand soul singer (born 1993)

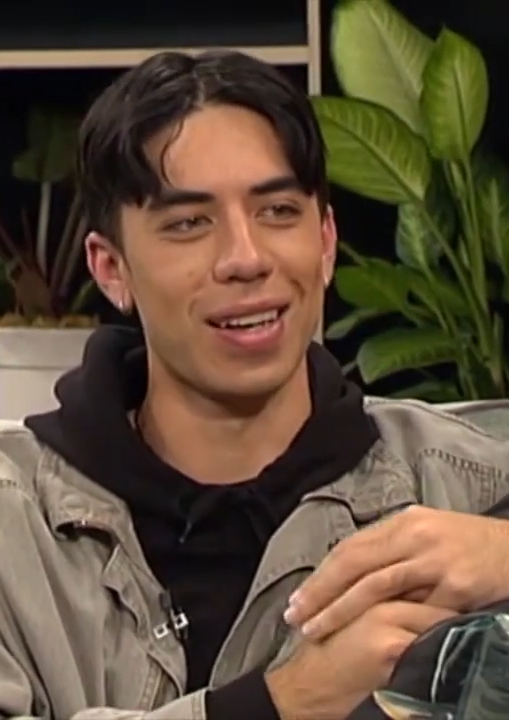
- Teeks in July 2017
- Born: Te Karehana Toi; 26 October 1993 (age 33); Northland, New Zealand
- Occupations: Singer; songwriter
- Website: thisisteeks.com

Te Karehana Gardiner-Toi (born 26 October 1993), known by his mononym Teeks, is a New Zealand singer-songwriter.

== Life and career ==
Teeks was born in 1993 in Northland and has Ngāpuhi, Ngāi Te Rangi and Ngāti Ranginui ancestry. He grew up in his father's home in Opononi, near Hokianga from the age of eleven, but also spent significant time in Tauranga, where his mother lives. He has five siblings. After high school he studied music at Unitec and taught Māori language classes at the university.

In 2017, he released his debut EP The Grapefruit Skies. At the 2017 New Zealand Music Awards, Teeks won Best Māori Artist and was nominated for Breakthrough Artist of the Year and Best Soul/RnB Artist.

The music video for his single, "Without You", was released on 19 August 2020. It was directed by Tom Gould and was shot in Hokianga during January 2020. Teeks has said, "It's my favourite place in the world", adding that this is the territory his father is from.

His debut album, Something to Feel, was released on 26 March 2021. Later that year, Teeks won Best Solo Artist, Best Soul/RnB Artist and Best Māori Artist at the 2021 Aotearoa Music Awards.

Teeks performed the New Zealand National anthem at the 1st rugby test match between New Zealand and South Africa on 15 July 2023 in te reo Māori.

His second album Lovers Comet was released on 30 October 2026.

== Discography ==
=== Albums ===
List of studio albums, with selected chart positions
Title	Details	Peak chart positions	Certifications
Title	Details	NZ	Certifications
Something to Feel	Released: 26 March 2021; Label: Sony	1	RMNZ: 2× Platinum
Lovers Comet	Released: 30 October 2026; Label: Sony	4	

=== Extended plays ===
List of EPs, with selected chart positions
Title	Details	Peak chart positions	Certifications
Title	Details	NZ	Certifications
The Grapefruit Skies	Released: 23 June 2017; Label: Self-released	10	RMNZ: Gold
I	Released: 28 August 2020; Label: Sony	—	
II	Released: 13 November 2020; Label: Sony	—	

=== Singles ===
List of singles, with selected chart positions
Title	Year	Peak chart positions	Album
Title	Year	NZ Hot	Album
"If Only"	2017	—	The Grapefruit Skies EP
"Never Be Apart"	2017	—	The Grapefruit Skies EP
"Whakaaria Mai (How Great Thou Art)" (with Hollie Smith)	2019	—	Non-album single
"Without You"	2020	—	Something to Feel
"Remember Me"	2020	—	Something to Feel
"First Time"	2021	20	Something to Feel
"Younger"	2021	4	Something to Feel
"I Can't Make You Love Me" (feat. Nick Dow) [Live at the Auckland Town Hall, featuring Nick Dow on Piano]	2021	—	Non-album single
"Oil and Water"	2021	8	Something to Feel
"Love Is a Losing Game" (live at Stebbing Studio)	2022	—	Non-album singles
"Video Games" (live at Stebbing Studio)	2022	—	Non-album singles
"Red Light"	2024	20	Non-album singles
"Landslide" (live at Auckland Town Hall)	2026	—	Non-album singles
"My Boy"	2026	5	Lovers Comet
"Overdose"	2026	20	Lovers Comet
"Narcotica"	2026	39	Lovers Comet
"Feel My Love" (featuring Majic)	2026	—	Lovers Comet
"Headlights"	2026	21	Lovers Comet
