= Dead Favours =

New Zealand alternative rock group

- Origin: Auckland, New Zealand
- Genres: Alternative rock
- Years active: 2016–present
- Formerly of: Steriogram; Skinny Hobos
- Members: Jared Wrennall; Alex Ferrier; Kyle Wetton; Charlie Smith
- Past members: Will Kearney
- Website: http://www.deadfavours.com

Dead Favours is an alternative rock group from Auckland, New Zealand. Formed in 2016 by drummer Charlie Smith and vocalist Jared Wrennall, previously the drummer for Grammy Award-nominated punk band Steriogram. The band consists of Alex Ferrier (bass guitar/vocals), Jared Wrennall (vocals/guitar), Kyle Wetton (guitar) and Charlie Smith (drums).

== History ==
Since their formation in early 2016, the band have released a string of singles, the most notable to date being ‘Dig’ (produced by Shihad member Tom Larkin), which quickly grabbed the attention of both audiences and radio programmers alike, spending 27 weeks in the charts. The success of the debut single lead to a nationwide tour alongside the already popular Skinny Hobos, Decades and Bakers Eddy which saw the band increase momentum.

The band quickly followed with the singles ‘High Flying’ and ‘Better The Weather’ in 2017, gathering support across the country throughout the year.

In early 2018, Dead Favours joined Rise Against on their Wolves Tour for both New Zealand shows, playing to packed arenas. Straight off the back of the Rise Against New Zealand leg, Dead Favours played both Demon Energy Rock the Park and Homegrown Music Festival (New Zealand), before joining Royal Blood on the New Zealand leg of their Australasian tour in May.

In 2019, Dead Favours returned to Homegrown Music Festival (New Zealand) before touring with Villainy (band). Dead Favours also released their debut album 'Misbehaviour' on 21 June 2019.

Alex Ferrier from Aotearoa Music Award nominated band Skinny Hobos was invited to join the band in writing their two-part follow up to 'Misbehaviour' titled 'Riffing & Yelling' in late 2020. Side A was released on 21 May, 2021 and went on to win the band Te Kaipuoro Rakapioi Toa, Best Rock Artist at the 2021 Aotearoa Music Awards. 'Riffing & Yelling' was produced by Chris Mac from the notable New Zealand band Six60. Side B of 'Riffing & Yelling' is scheduled for release in March 2023.

== Releases ==
=== Dig ===
Dead Favours debut single "Dig" was released on 10 March 2017 and debuted at #1 on the iTunes New Zealand Rock Chart, as well as charting #4 on the Official New Zealand Music Chart Heatseakers singles chart.

Dig peaked at #8 on the Radioscope Radio Rock Charts and #1 for New Zealand rock tracks, Dig spent 23 weeks in the Radioscope charts. "Dig" is playlisted on The Rock (New Zealand) as well as the Spotify official playlist "Rock Out".

=== High Flying ===
Dead Favours released their second single "High Flying" on 18 August 2017. Playlisted on both Radio Hauraki and The Rock FM, as well as returning with their second single to the Spotify official playlist "Rock Out". To date, High Flying has reached #8 on the Radioscope Radio Rock Charts and #1 for New Zealand rock tracks.

=== Better the Weather ===
Dead Favours released their third single "Better the Weather" on 26 January 2018. Playlisted on both Radio Hauraki and The Rock FM, as well as the Spotify official playlists "Rock Out" and "New Music Friday".

=== Misbehaviour (album) ===
Dead Favours released their debut album on 21 June 2019, featured 10 tracks, including singles "On Your Own", "Lost on You" and "Misbehaviour". The album debuted at #1 on the iTunes Rock charts in New Zealand and #3 for albums overall.

=== Riffing & Yelling Side A (EP) ===
Released 21 May, 2021. Recorded and mixed by Neil Baldock, produced by Chris Mac from Six60. Side A of Riffing & Yelling went on to win the Aotearoa (New Zealand) Music Award for Te Kaipuoro Rakapioi Toa, Best Rock Artist at the 2021 Aotearoa Music Awards. This was the first release to feature Alex Ferrier on Bass and backing vocals. Side B was delayed by the COVID-19 pandemic and was released in March 2023.

== Discography ==
=== Singles ===
List of singles, with selected chart positions
Title	Year	Peak chart positions	
Title	Year	Radioscope Rock	NZ Top 40
"Dig"	2017	8	4 (Heatseakers NZ single chart)
"High Flying"	2017	8	–
"Better the Weather"	2018	8	5

=== Albums ===
List of albums, with selected chart positions
Title	Year	Peak chart positions	
Title	Year	iTunes Rock	iTunes Overall
"Misbehaviour"	2019	1	3

== Awards and nominations ==
Awards	Year	Type	Song or album	Notes
Aotearoa Music Awards	2021	Te Kaipuoro Rakapioi Toa, Best Rock Artist	"Riffing & Yelling Side A"	Won
