= Ekko Park =

New Zealand musical group

- Origin: Auckland, New Zealand
- Members: Joe Walsh; Jessie Booth; Nick Douch; Bryan Bell
- Past members: Joel Halstead; Callum Tong; Alex Hargreaves
- Website: www.ekkopark.com

Ekko Park are a rock band from Auckland, New Zealand, that consists of guitarist and singer Joe Walsh, guitarist Jessie Booth, drummer Nick Douch and bassist Bryan Bell.

Ekko Park have released two albums: 2013's Tomorrow, Tomorrow, Today which was nominated for Best Rock Album at the 2014 New Zealand Music Awards and 2015's Know Hope which was nominated for the 2016 Taite Music Prize. Both albums charted Top 15 in the Official New Zealand Music Chart and were in the Top 5 local releases on release week.

The singles 'Probable Cause' and 'Validation' from Know Hope were released to radio in Europe in 2016 and caused a massive stir in Italy with 'Probable Cause' going to #1 & 'Validation' going to #3 on the Official Italian Rock Radio Airplay Chart. July 2017 saw the band release a brand new single and video called "Going Uptown"

The band have played sold-out tours of NZ, headlined tours of the UK, Ireland & Italy, supported major international touring acts including Seether, The Living End and Simple Plan as well as playing major New Zealand festivals including Rhythm & Vines and Homegrown.

The band released their third album 'Horizon' on August 21, 2020. The first single from the album 'All Eyes On Me' features guest vocalist Grant Nicholas of Welsh indie rock giants Feeder.

The band were nominated for Best Rock Artist at the 2021 Aotearoa Music Awards.

== Discography ==
=== Singles ===
Title	Year	Album
"Simpatico"	2012	Tomorrow Tomorrow Today
"Becoming The Enemy"	2013	Tomorrow Tomorrow Today
"My Crime"	2013	Tomorrow Tomorrow Today
"Always A Fire"	2014	Tomorrow Tomorrow Today
"Validation"	2015	Know Hope
"Probable Cause"	2015	Know Hope
"Surface Breaks"	2016	Know Hope
"Whistleblower"	2016	Know Hope
"Christmas Is Home"	2016	Xmas In Rock 2 Compilation
"Going Uptown"	2017	Single Only
"All Eyes On Me"	2020	Horizon
"Uh Oh"	2020	Horizon
"Bassano Sky"	2020	Horizon
"Go Stop Go"	2020	Horizon
"No Courage for Courage"	2020	Horizon
"Oil & Water"	2020	Horizon
"Three Days in March (A Letter to Mary)"	2020	Horizon
"Tea & Toast"	2020	Horizon
"Black Eyed"	2020	Horizon
"Clan"	2020	Horizon
"Breakdown"	2022	UnMute
"Violent Silent"	2022	UnMute
"Darling, Baby"	2022	UnMute
"False Embrace"	2022	UnMute
"Outrun the Rain"	2023	

=== Albums ===
Title	Year	Chart Position	Awards
Tomorrow Tomorrow Today	2013	#15 Official New Zealand Music Chart Top 40	Nominated Best Rock Album at 2014 New Zealand Music Awards
Know Hope	2015	#13 Official New Zealand Music Chart Top 40	Nominated for Taite Music Prize 2016
Horizon	2020		
UnMute	2022		
