= Southside of Bombay =

New Zealand Maori musical band

- Origin: New Zealand
- Years active: 1989–present
- Past members: Maranga Ake Ai; Maaka McGregor

Southside of Bombay are a Māori band from New Zealand. They are best known for their single 'What's the Time, Mr Wolf?' which was originally released in 1992. The song was re-released following its appearance in the 1994 film and on the soundtrack of Once Were Warriors, after which it became second best selling New Zealand single that year.

The band was named to signify that there was another world to music outside of Auckland, New Zealand.

== Discography ==
Albums

Year	Album
1992	All Across the World

Singles

Year	Single	Peak chart positions
Year	Single	New Zealand
1992	All Across the World	39
1994	What's the Time, Mr Wolf?	3
1995	Kia Mau (featuring Mina Ripia)	—

Compilation appearances

Year	Album	Song	Record company
1994	Once Were Warriors Soundtrack	What's the Time, Mr Wolf?	Milan Records
1995	Kiwi Rock, Vol. 2	What's the Time, Mr Wolf?	EMI Music
1996	In the Neighbourhood	What's the Time, Mr Wolf?	WEA
2001	Pagan Gold	What's The Time Mr Wolf?	Pagan Records

== Awards ==
New Zealand Music Awards

- 1993 'Best Māori Recording' for "All Across the World"
- 1996 'Best Polynesian Recording' for "Umbadada"
- 1996 'Mana Māori Award' for "Kia Mau"
- 1996 'Mana Reo Award' for "Kia Mau"
- 1999 'Mana Maori Award' for "Live in Aotearoa"
