= Straight Line Was a Lie =

Studio album by the Beths
- Released: 29 August 2025
- Genre: Indie rock
- Length: 43:42
- Label: Anti-

The Beths chronology
Expert in a Dying Field (2022)	Straight Line Was a Lie (2025)

Straight Line Was a Lie is the fourth studio album by the New Zealand indie rock band the Beths. The album was released on 29 August 2025 through Anti- and received positive reviews.

== Track listing ==
All tracks are written by Elizabeth Stokes and arranged by the Beths.

Straight Line Was a Lie track listing
No.	Title	Length
1.	"Straight Line Was a Lie"	4:04
2.	"Mosquitoes"	4:43
3.	"No Joy"	3:17
4.	"Metal"	4:43
5.	"Mother, Pray for Me"	4:50
6.	"Til My Heart Stops"	4:14
7.	"Take"	3:56
8.	"Roundabout"	4:23
9.	"Ark of the Covenant"	4:22
10.	"Best Laid Plans"	5:05
Total length:		43:42

== Personnel ==
Credits are from the album's official Bandcamp page.

- Elizabeth Stokes – guitar, vocals, writing
- Jonathan Pearce – guitar, production, engineering, mixing (except tracks 5 and 10)
- Benjamin Sinclair – bass guitar
- Tristan Deck – drums and cymbals
- Michael Howell – production and engineering
- Bevan Smith – mixing
- Joe Lambert – mastering
- Lily Paris West – artwork

== Charts ==
Chart performance for Straight Line Was a Lie
Chart (2025)	Peak position
Australian Albums (ARIA)	83
New Zealand Albums (RMNZ)	5
Scottish Albums (OCC)	37
UK Albums Sales (OCC)	25
UK Independent Albums (OCC)	11
US Top Album Sales (Billboard)	19
