= Jordyn with a Why =

New Zealand singer-songwriter

- Also known as: Jordyn Rapana
- Born: Jordyn Fuala'au Awatea Morgan; 1992 or 1993 (age 33–34); Ōtara, Auckland, New Zealand
- Genres: R&B; neo-soul; pop

Jordyn Fuala'au Awatea Rapana (née Morgan; born 1992/1993), better known as Jordyn with a Why, is a R&B and neo-soul singer-songwriter from Raglan, New Zealand.

She's been described as "Aotearoa's Indigenous sweetie lover girl" by CubaDupa, and her "ethereal R&B songs" have been praised by Rolling Stone.

Outside of her music career, Rapana teaches full immersion te reo Māori at Te Wānanga o Aotearoa.

== Early life ==
Rapana was born in 1992 or 1993 and raised in South Auckland. Her father was a pastor, and she grew up singing in church.

Rapana is of Māori and Samoan ancestry; her father is Māori from Tainui Āwhiro, and her mother is Samoan from Mulifanua Lalovi, Falelatai, and Vaimoso.

== Career ==
She released her debut single, "Te Ao Mārama", in March 2021. She said she had "no intent" for a career in music, and had written the track as a way to help her personally process her experience of a miscarriage.

"Te Ao Mārama" was followed by the release of her second single, "Brown Melodies", in 2022.

Her third single, 2023's "Raumati", was her first in te reo Māori. It came after Rapana, who grew up without speaking Māori, had spent the last five years immersing herself in the language, including using it as her second son's first language. "Raumati" would go on to earn Rapana a nomination for the APRA Maioha Award at the 2023 Silver Scrolls, and placed 16th in the year-end Top 20 Te Reo Māori Singles chart.

Her debut album Hibiscus Moon, Love & Justice was released in 2024, and was ranked 28th best New Zealand album of the year by Rolling Stone Australia / New Zealand. The album went on to earn Rapana nominations for the Best Māori Artist, Mana Reo (for "Reia"), and People's Choice awards at the 2025 Aotearoa Music Awards, and went on to win the Recorded Music NZ Best Pacific Music Album at the 2025 Pacific Music Awards.

== Personal life ==
Rapana performs in both English and te reo Māori, and has spoken in favour of having more reo Māori music in mainstream spaces. She learnt te reo Māori in 2019 by taking a year-long full immersion course at Te Wānanga Takiura; she would go on to teach full immersion language classes at Te Wānanga o Aotearoa.

Rapana lives in Auckland with her husband and two sons.

== Discography ==
=== Studio albums ===
- Hibiscus Moon, Love & Justice (2024)

=== Singles ===
Title	Year	Peak chart positions		Album
Title	Year	Hot 20 Aotearoa	Top 10 Te Reo Māori	Album
"Te Ao Mārama"	2021	18	—	Non-album singles
"Brown Melodies"	2022	9	—	Non-album singles
"Raumati"	2023	—	5	Non-album singles
"Don't Rush" with Te Kuru Dewes and Anna Coddington	2023	20	10	Non-album singles
"Hey Love" (feat. MOHI)	2023	—	9	Non-album singles
"Set... Go" (feat. MOHI and choicevaughan)	2023	12	—	Non-album singles
"Reia"	2024	9	—	Hibiscus Moon, Love & Justice
"Māku Anō" (feat. MOHI)	2024	11	—	Hibiscus Moon, Love & Justice
"Hauora Melodies"	2025	8	—	Non-album singles
"Nekenekehia Te Aroha" with TAWAZ, Sid Diamond, and Chey Milne	2025	20	—	Non-album singles

== Awards and nominations ==
Year	Award	Work(s) Nominated	Category	Result	Ref.
2023	APRA Awards	"Ruamati"	APRA Maioha Award	Finalist	
2024	Aotearoa Music Awards	—	Best Māori Artist	Nominated	
2024	Aotearoa Music Awards	"He Rei Niho"	Mana Reo	Nominated	
2024	APRA Awards	"He Rei Niho"	APRA Maioha Award	Won	
2025	Aotearoa Music Awards	Hibiscus Moon, Love & Justice	Best Māori Artist	Nominated	
2025	Aotearoa Music Awards	"Reia"	Mana Reo	Nominated	
2025	Aotearoa Music Awards	—	People's Choice	Nominated	
2025	Pacific Music Awards	Hibiscus Moon, Love & Justice	Best Pacific Music Album	Won	
