= Tipene =

Tipene is a Māori masculine given name and surname. It is the Māori form of Stephen. It may refer to:

== Given name ==
- Tipene Friday (born 1990), New Zealand cricketer and basketball player
- Tipene O'Regan (born 1939), New Zealand academic and company director
- Logan Tipene Rogerson (born 1998), New Zealand footballer
- Puti Tipene Watene (1910–1967), New Zealand rugby league player and politician

== Surname ==
- Benny Tipene (born 1990), New Zealand singer
