= Bakers Eddy =

New Zealand/Australian punk rock group

- Origin: Wellington, New Zealand and Melbourne, Australia
- Genres: punk; rock
- Years active: 2009–present
- Label: Ivy League Records
- Members: Ciarann Babbington - Vocals; Jamie Gordon - Drums; Alex Spagnolo - Guitar; Ian Spagnolo - Bass
- Website: www.bakerseddy.com

Bakers Eddy are a New Zealand punk rock group based in Australia. They released their debut studio album Love Boredom Bicycles on 25 March 2022.

== Career ==
The group forming when they were 12-years-old in Wellington, New Zealand before relocating to Melbourne, Australia in 2017 where they live in a share house.

In November 2021, the group released "My Baby’s Like Cigarettes" and announced the forthcoming release of their debut studio album, Love Boredom Bicycles on 25 March 2022. Frontman Ciarann Babbington said in a statement, "The whole record is supposed to sound like the life of the party."

== Discography ==
=== Studio albums ===
List of studio albums, with release date, label, and selected chart positions shown
Title	Album details	Peak chart positions
Title	Album details	AUS
Love Boredom Bicycles	Released: 25 March 2022; Label: Ivy League Records (IVY683); Format: CD, LP, Digital download, streaming	(Note: Love Boredom Bicycles did not enter the ARIA Top 50 Albums Chart, but peaked at number 18 on the ARIA Vinyl Albums Chart.)

=== Extended plays ===
List of EPs, with release date and label shown
Title	EP details
Plastic Wasteland	Released: 2015; Label: Bakers Eddy; Formats: CDr
I'm Not Making Good Decisions	Released: 20 April 2018; Label: Bakers Eddy; Formats: CDr, Digital download, streaming
I'm Doing Better	Released: 6 June 2025; Label: Bakers Eddy, ADA, Warner Australia; Formats: Digital download, streaming

=== Singles ===
List of singles, with year released and album name shown
Title	Year	Album
"Hyper Excessive Consumption"	2014	Plastic Wasteland
"Something Outside"	2015	Plastic Wasteland
"Wallbreaker"	2016	non album singles
"Big Man"	2016	non album singles
"If You See Kay"	2017	I'm Not Making Good Decisions
"Sad and Happy"	2018	I'm Not Making Good Decisions
"Good Decisions"	2018	I'm Not Making Good Decisions
"Jack Shit for You"	2018	I'm Not Making Good Decisions
"Leave It to Me"	2018	non album singles
"Can't Afford It"	2019	non album singles
"On My Own"	2019	non album singles
"T Shirt"	2020	non album singles
"A Verry Merry Christmas"	2020	non album singles
"21"	2021	Love Boredom Bicycles
"Concertina"	2021	Love Boredom Bicycles
"Space Is Nothing"	2021	Love Boredom Bicycles
"My Baby's Like Cigarettes"	2021	Love Boredom Bicycles
"Hi-Vis Baby"	2022	Love Boredom Bicycles
"Sober"	2022	Love Boredom Bicycles
"Motor Racing"/"Easy Steeze"	2022	TBA
"Manners Street"	2025	I'm Doing Better
"UFO"	2025	I'm Doing Better
"Dust On My Brain"	2025	I'm Doing Better
"Hopeless Dreams"	2025	I'm Doing Better
