= Wax Chattels =

From top-to-bottom: Peter Ruddell, Amanda Cheng and Tom Leggett performing in 2018.

Wax Chattels are a three-piece noise rock band from Auckland, New Zealand. The band, who describe themselves as "guitarless guitar music", is made up of Peter Ruddell on keyboards and vocals, Amanda Cheng on bass and vocals, and Tom Leggett on drums. Their self-titled debut album, Wax Chattels, was released by Flying Nun Records and Captured Tracks in 2018, followed by Clot in 2020.

== History ==
Wax Chattels was formed in 2016 by Ruddell, Cheng, and Leggett, who originally all met whilst studying jazz at Auckland University before reconnecting a number of years later at a Preoccupations show.

Their self-titled debut album, Wax Chattels, was recorded over two nights, with sessions beginning at 8pm and running through to 4am. Released in May 2018, the album peaked at number 37 on the Official Aotearoa Music Charts Top 40 Albums and at number 7 on the Top New Zealand Albums chart.

They released their follow-up album, Clot, in 2020.

== Discography ==
=== Albums ===
- Wax Chattels (2018)
- Clot (2020)

== Awards and nominations ==
Year	Award	Work(s) nominated	Category	Result	Ref.
2018	New Zealand Music Awards	Wax Chattels	Best Alternative Artist	Nominated	
2019	Taite Music Prize	Wax Chattels	Taite Music Prize	Finalist	
2019	Taite Music Prize	Wax Chattels	Best Independent Debut Award	Finalist	
2021	Aotearoa Music Awards	Clot	Best Alternative Artist	Nominated	
2021	Taite Music Prize	Clot	Taite Music Prize	Finalist	
