= Jump Rope Gazers =

Studio album by the Beths
- Released: 10 July 2020
- Length: 38:50
- Label: Carpark

The Beths chronology
Future Me Hates Me (2018)	Jump Rope Gazers (2020)	Expert in a Dying Field (2022)

Professional ratings
Aggregate scores
Source	Rating
AnyDecentMusic?	7.7/10
Metacritic	79/100
Review scores
Source	Rating
AllMusic	4/5 stars
American Songwriter	4.5/5 stars
Clash	6/10
DIY	4/5 stars
Exclaim!	8/10
The Line of Best Fit	8.5/10
NME	3/5 stars
Pitchfork	6.3/10
Rolling Stone	4/5 stars
Slant Magazine	3.5/5 stars

Jump Rope Gazers is the second studio album by New Zealand indie rock band the Beths. It was released on 10 July 2020 through Carpark Records.

== Track listing ==
No.	Title	Length
1.	"I'm Not Getting Excited"	2:42
2.	"Dying to Believe"	3:34
3.	"Jump Rope Gazers"	5:12
4.	"Acrid"	4:07
5.	"Do You Want Me Now"	4:16
6.	"Out of Sight"	3:40
7.	"Don't Go Away"	4:11
8.	"Mars, the God of War"	2:53
9.	"You Are a Beam of Light"	3:51
10.	"Just Shy of Sure"	4:24
Total length:		38:50

== Charts ==
Weekly chart performance for Jump Rope Gazers
Chart (2020)	Peak position
New Zealand Albums (RMNZ)	2
