= Paul Garnes =

American film and television producer

- Garnes in 2026
- Born: Pittsburgh, Pennsylvania, U.S.
- Occupations: Film and television producer

Paul Goodwin Garnes is an American film and television producer. He is best known for his work on the 2014 film Selma, which was nominated for the 2015 Academy Award for Best Picture and Best Original Song and won a 2015 Golden Globe Award for Best Original Song.

In 2012, his film Middle of Nowhere, directed by Ava DuVernay, won the 2013 Independent Spirit John Cassavetes Award.

== Early life ==
Garnes was born in Pittsburgh, Pennsylvania, and soon after adopted by Marjorie Goodwin Garnes and Paul Garnes. Garnes grew up in Harvey, Illinois

Garnes attended Thornton Township High School in Harvey, Illinois, where he graduated in 1989. He is a 1994 graduate of Chicago's Columbia College

He is the grandson of the late Bishop Bennie E. Goodwin, former bishop of the Fifth Jurisdiction Of Illinois Churches of God in Christ and founder of Portland Street Church of God in Christ in Chicago Heights, Illinois.

== Career ==
Paul Garnes has served as producer, line producer and/or production manager on films and television series for Disney, DreamWorks, HBO, ABC, NBC, BET, Sony/Screen Gems, Magnolia Pictures, and Paramount Pictures.

A graduate of Chicago's Columbia College, Garnes has worked as Vice President of Operations and Production for Academy Award winner Jamie Foxx's Foxx/King Productions and Head of Production for Simmons-Lathan Media Group.

In 2006, Garnes was recruited by Tyler Perry and Reuben Cannon to join the Tyler Perry Company where he served as Vice President and Executive in Charge of Production until 2009, overseeing the creation of its multimillion-dollar studio and backlot. In addition to daily operations, Garnes supervised over 250 episodes of broadcast television while at the studio.

In 2011, he produced filmmaker Ava DuVernay's award-winning independent feature, Middle of Nowhere, which won Best Director honors at the 2012 Sundance Film Festival and the Independent Spirit Awards' John Cassavetes Award.

In 2014, Paul was executive producer of the film Selma, a biopic directed by Ava DuVernay and distributed by Paramount Pictures, which chronicles a series of the three Selma marches led by Dr. Martin Luther King Jr. supporting the Voting Rights Act of 1965. Selma is nominated for the 2015 Academy Award for Best Picture and Best Original Song, and won a 2015 Golden Globe for Best Original Song.

In an interview from January 2015, he stated, “It’s not about ‘reclaiming the narrative,’ necessarily, but offering a point of view about the civil rights movement that many people haven’t seen before. It was told from the perspective of the marcher standing on the bridge that day when there wasn’t government support during the actions that occurred on Bloody Sunday, about what it must have been like for these organizers to go into a pretty hostile environment using the skill set of nonviolence to push an agenda that maybe the country wasn’t ready for.”

In addition, Garnes continued his work as producer on the final season of BET's hit series The Game.

== Filmography ==
- 14th (2026) - Producer
- Origin (2023) - Producer
- Selma (2014) - Executive Producer, Unit Production Manager
- Middle of Nowhere (2012) - Producer
- Woman Thou Art Loosed (2004) - Line Producer, Production Supervisor
- You Got Served (2004) - Production Supervisor
- Playas Ball (2003) - Unit Production Manager
- Biker Boyz (2003) - Unit Production Manager
- Get Up Stand Up Comedy (2001) (Video) - Editor, Line Producer
- Dancing in September (2000) - Associate Producer, Production Supervisor
- Woo (1998) - Art Department Coordinator (second unit)
- The Players Club (1998) - Assistant Accountant
- Shock Asylum (1997) (Short) - Line Producer

== Television ==
- Being Mary Jane (2013-2015) - Line Producer
- The Game (2012-2015) - Line Producer
- Diggy Simmons MOW (TV Movie) (2013) - Line Producer
- House of Payne (2006-2011) - Unit Production Manager
- Partners (2011) - Production Supervisor
- Russell Simmons Presents: Hip Hop Justice (2004) - Supervising Producer
- An Evening with Russell Simmons (TV Movie) (2004) - Editor
- Roots: Celebrating 25 Years (TV Movie) (2002) - Co-Producer
- My Wife and Kids (2001) - Production Coordinator
- Smart Guy (1998-1999) - Production Coordinator

== Awards and nominations ==
Year	Recipient	Category	Award	Result
2013	Middle of Nowhere	John Cassavetes Award	Independent Spirit Awards	Won
2012	Middle of Nowhere	Best Film	Black Reel Awards	Nominated
2013	Middle of Nowhere	Best Film	Gotham Awards	Nominated
