= Road from 26 =

2023 album by Corrella

Studio album by Corrella
- Released: 26 May 2023
- Genre: Pop; roots reggae; New Zealand reggae; Pacific reggae
- Length: 32:49
- Label: Loop Recordings Aot(ear)oa
- Producer: Jimmy Colbert

Corrella chronology
Corrella EP (2021)	Road from 26 (2023)

Singles from Road from 26
- 1. "Skankin'" Released: 9 December 2022; 2. "Little Circles" Released: 31 March 2023; 3. "Ko Au (I Am Me)" Released: 5 May 2023; 4. "Whisky" Released: 26 May 2023; 5. "Blue Eyed Māori" Released: July 2023; 6. "Lady Divine" Released: 1 December 2023

Road from 26 is the debut studio album by New Zealand roots reggae band Corrella, released on 26 May 2023. The album features the single "Blue Eyed Māori", which was one of the top performing singles by a New Zealand artist for 2023.

== Production ==
Road from 26 was recorded at Parachute Studios in Kingsland, Auckland. The album features songs written by the bandmembers, in collaboration with Jess Rapana of Origin Roots Aotearoa, Selwyn Lloyd and producer Jimmy Colbert of the band 1814. The album title, Road from 26, is a reference to 26 Corrella Road, the address on the North Shore where the band used to practice.

The majority of the album was written by Pipiwharauroa Campbell and Te Naawe Tupe. "Ko Au (I Am Me)", sung bilingually in Māori and English, was written by Pipiwharauroa Campbell, about his own experiences with rediscovering pride in his cultural identity. "Blue Eyed Māori" is a song with two inspirations: multi-racial children born during the New Zealand Wars in the 19th Century, and Tupe's goddaughter. Many of their songs are inspired by their experiences as Navy personnel on overseas tours, while others are inspired by family members, including "Promise", a song dedicated to Campbell's son, and "Visions", the first song bass player Codi Wehi-Ngati wrote for the band, which he dedicated to his family.

The album features guest appearances by musicians Thabani Gapara, Christian Mausia and Gin the Artist. Gapara and Mausia perform horns on "Whisky", while Mausia performs the trumpet solo on "Blue Eyed Māori". Gin the Artist performs violin for the album's ending track, "Promise".

== Release and promotion ==
The album was preceded by the singles "Skankin'", released in December 2022, "Little Circles" in March 2023, and "Ko Au (I Am Me)" in early May.

The album was released on 26 May 2023, during NZ Music Month. "Whisky" was released as a single during the album's release, and "Blue Eyed Māori", a sleeper hit, was formally promoted to radio stations in July. The band toured the album in New Zealand, with a six-date tour from July to September, ending with a performance at the Kingslander in Auckland, where they were supported by New Zealand reggae band Mirage. The album's final single, "Lady Divine", was released in December.

In late 2023, "Blue Eyed Māori" was certified platinum in New Zealand, and became the eighth best performing song by a New Zealand artist in New Zealand for 2023, and the only song released in 2023 to make the top 20 singles by New Zealand artists.

== Critical reception ==
Kerry MB of muzic.net.nz reviewed the album positively, calling Road from 26 "a stunner" and "a beautiful, well-rounded album with so much hidden gems". She praised the vocals by Pipiwharauroa Campbell and Rebecca Brady's lead vocals on "Little Circles", as well as the "beautiful harmon[ies] and melod[ies]" of the album. MB likened Road from 26 to New Zealand musicians L.A.B. and Six60, but believed that Corrella had a unique sound of their own.

== Track listing ==
Road from 26 track listing
No.	Title	Writer(s)	Length
1.	"Whisky"	Pipiwharauroa Campbell; Te Naawe Tupe; Jess Rapana	4:16
2.	"Vision"	Codi Wehi-Ngatai	2:40
3.	"Lady Divine"	Campbell	3:27
4.	"Bonfire"	Campbell; Tupe	3:26
5.	"Skankin'"	Tupe	4:05
6.	"Little Circles"	Tupe	4:08
7.	"Blue Eyed Māori"	Campbell; Tupe	3:16
8.	"Ko Au (I Am Me)"	Campbell	3:25
9.	"Promise"	Campbell; Selwyn Lloyd	4:00
Total length:			32:49

== Charts ==
Weekly chart performance for Road from 26
Chart (2023)	Peak position
New Zealand Artist Albums (Recorded Music NZ)	7

== Certifications ==
Certifications for Road from 26
Region	Certification	Certified units/sales
New Zealand (RMNZ)	Platinum	15,000^{‡}
^{‡} Sales+streaming figures based on certification alone.
