= Expert in a Dying Field =

2022 studio album by the Beths

Studio album by the Beths
- Released: 16 September 2022
- Recorded: 2021–February 2022
- Length: 44:59
- Label: Carpark

The Beths chronology
Jump Rope Gazers (2020)	Expert in a Dying Field (2022)	Straight Line Was a Lie (2025)

Expert in a Dying Field is the third studio album by New Zealand indie rock band the Beths. It was released on 16 September 2022 by Carpark Records. The cover art features a haku (kingfish).

A deluxe edition was released in 2023, featuring 3 demos, 2 acoustic versions, and 2 previously stand-alone singles.

== Critical reception ==
Professional ratings
Aggregate scores
Source	Rating
AnyDecentMusic?	7.9/10
Metacritic	83/100
Review scores
Source	Rating
AllMusic	4/5 stars
The Daily Telegraph	4/5 stars
Exclaim!	8/10
The Line of Best Fit	8/10
Loud and Quiet	7/10
Mojo	4/5 stars
NME	4/5 stars
Pitchfork	8/10
The Skinny	3/5 stars
Slant Magazine	4.5/5 stars

Expert in a Dying Field received acclaim from music critics. At Metacritic, which assigns a normalised rating out of 100 to reviews from mainstream critics, the album received an average score of 83 based on 15 reviews.

Jonathan Wright with God Is in the TV states "It appears to be in the band's DNA that they can keep creating this brand of addictive indie pop songs that all feel like essential additions to their already strong back catalogue." Laura Snapes, for Pitchfork, asserts that the album is "brimming with smart power-pop that brings to mind the casual virtuosity of '90s Aimee Mann and the bonhomie and euphoria of Superchunk and Fountains of Wayne." Poetic Justice Magazine concluded that Expert in a Dying Field is "an impressive and engaging record".

Year-end lists
Publication	List	Rank	Ref
BrooklynVegan	Indie Basement: Top 40 Albums of 2022	14	
BrooklynVegan	Top 50 Albums of 2022	29	
The Forty-Five	The Best Albums of 2022	23	
Impose	The Top 50 Albums of 2022	Unranked	
Magnet	Top 25 Albums of 2022	12	
ourculture	The 50 Best Albums of 2022	24	
Paste	The Best Albums of 2022	14	
Pitchfork	The 50 Best Albums of 2022	47	
Pitchfork	The 38 Best Rock Albums of 2022	Unranked	
PopMatters	The 25 Best Indie Rock Albums of 2022	10	
The Ringer	The 33 Best Albums of 2022	13	
Rolling Stone	The 100 Best Albums of 2022	67	
Slant	The 50 Best Albums of 2022	22	
Stereogum	The 50 Best Albums 2022	7	

== Track listing ==
Expert in a Dying Field track listing
No.	Title	Length
1.	"Expert in a Dying Field"	4:11
2.	"Knees Deep"	3:39
3.	"Silence Is Golden"	2:56
4.	"Your Side"	4:41
5.	"I Want to Listen"	2:12
6.	"Head in the Clouds"	4:01
7.	"Best Left"	3:58
8.	"Change in the Weather"	3:42
9.	"When You Know You Know"	4:08
10.	"A Passing Rain"	3:15
11.	"I Told You That I Was Afraid"	3:21
12.	"2am"	4:49
Total length:		44:59

Deluxe edition bonus tracks
No.	Title	Length
13.	"I Told You I was Afraid" (acoustic)	3:11
14.	"When You Know You Know" (acoustic)	4:03
15.	"A Real Thing"	3:34
16.	"Watching the Credits"	3:15
17.	"Keep the Distance" (demo)	4:08
18.	"Expert in a Dying Field" (demo)	4:09
19.	"I Want to Listen" (demo)	2:59
20.	"2am" (demo)	3:41

== Charts ==
=== Weekly charts ===
Weekly chart performance for Expert in a Dying Field
Chart (2022)	Peak position
Australian Albums (ARIA)	80
New Zealand Albums (RMNZ)	1

=== Year-end charts ===
Year-end chart performance for Expert in a Dying Field
Chart (2022)	Position
New Zealand Artist Albums (RMNZ)	18
