= Future Me Hates Me =

2018 studio album by the Beths

Studio album by the Beths
- Released: 10 August 2018
- Genre: Indie rock
- Length: 38:54
- Label: Carpark
- Producer: Jonathan Pearce

The Beths chronology
Warm Blood (2016)	Future Me Hates Me (2018)	Jump Rope Gazers (2020)

Singles from Future Me Hates Me
- 1. "Great No One" Released: 2017; 2. "Future Me Hates Me" Released: 2018; 3. "Happy Unhappy" Released: 2018; 4. "You Wouldn't Like Me" Released: 2018; 5. "Little Death" Released: 2018

Future Me Hates Me is the debut studio album by New Zealand indie rock band the Beths. It was produced by the band's lead guitarist Jonathan Pearce and released on Carpark Records' label on 10 August 2018.

== Background and recording ==
Released on August 10, 2018, Future Me Hates Me was the band's debut album, following their extended play Warm Blood in 2016. The album was produced by the band's lead guitarist Jonathan Pearce, and recorded in-house at his studio on Karangahape Road in Auckland; Elizabeth Stokes wrote all of the lyrics.

In an interview with Rolling Stone, Stokes had a hard time articulating exactly what the album was about, mentioning "infatuation or something", "self-hiding" and "self-directed telling-offs". At Rolling Stone, Eli Enis wrote that much of the lyrical content on the album deals with "Stokes' reluctant attitude toward romance, and the anxiety that stems from overthinking her feelings"; Jon Dolan wrote that the lyrics were filled with "auto-critical logorrhea".

== Critical reception ==
Professional ratings
Aggregate scores
Source	Rating
Metacritic	83/100
Review scores
Source	Rating
The A.V. Club	B+
The New Zealand Herald	4/5 stars
PopMatters	8/10
Pitchfork	7.9/10
Rolling Stone	4/5 stars
The Skinny	4/5 stars

Future Me Hates Me received universal acclaim from critics. At Metacritic, which assigns a normalised rating out of 100 to reviews from mainstream publications, the album received a score of 83, based on 11 reviews. Larry Fitzmaurice of Pitchfork wrote that it was "one of the most impressive indie-rock debuts of the year ... tight, hook-filled songwriting filled with energy and attitude, paired with lyrics that cut to the bone and a sense of confidence that betrays the record's at-times slackened vibe."

At The Skinny, Hayley Scott wrote that "Stokes' songwriting focuses on existential themes and self-deprecation while negating the need for the kind of down-tempo musical styles that typically accompanies sadness... resulting in a perfect riposte to the kind of po-faced cynicism that’s typically associated with angst-y guitar pop." Writing for PopMatters, Justin Cober-Lake said that "the driving pop-rock of the Beths should heat up speakers, with sugary melodies and energetic guitars making for an exciting debut".

== Track listing ==
No.	Title	Length
1.	"Great No One"	3:22
2.	"Future Me Hates Me"	4:05
3.	"Uptown Girl"	2:31
4.	"You Wouldn't Like Me"	3:32
5.	"Not Running"	3:51
6.	"Little Death"	4:54
7.	"Happy Unhappy"	3:29
8.	"River Run: Lvl 1"	4:06
9.	"Whatever"	4:24
10.	"Less Than Thou"	4:17
Total length:		38:31
