= The Beths =

New Zealand indie rock band

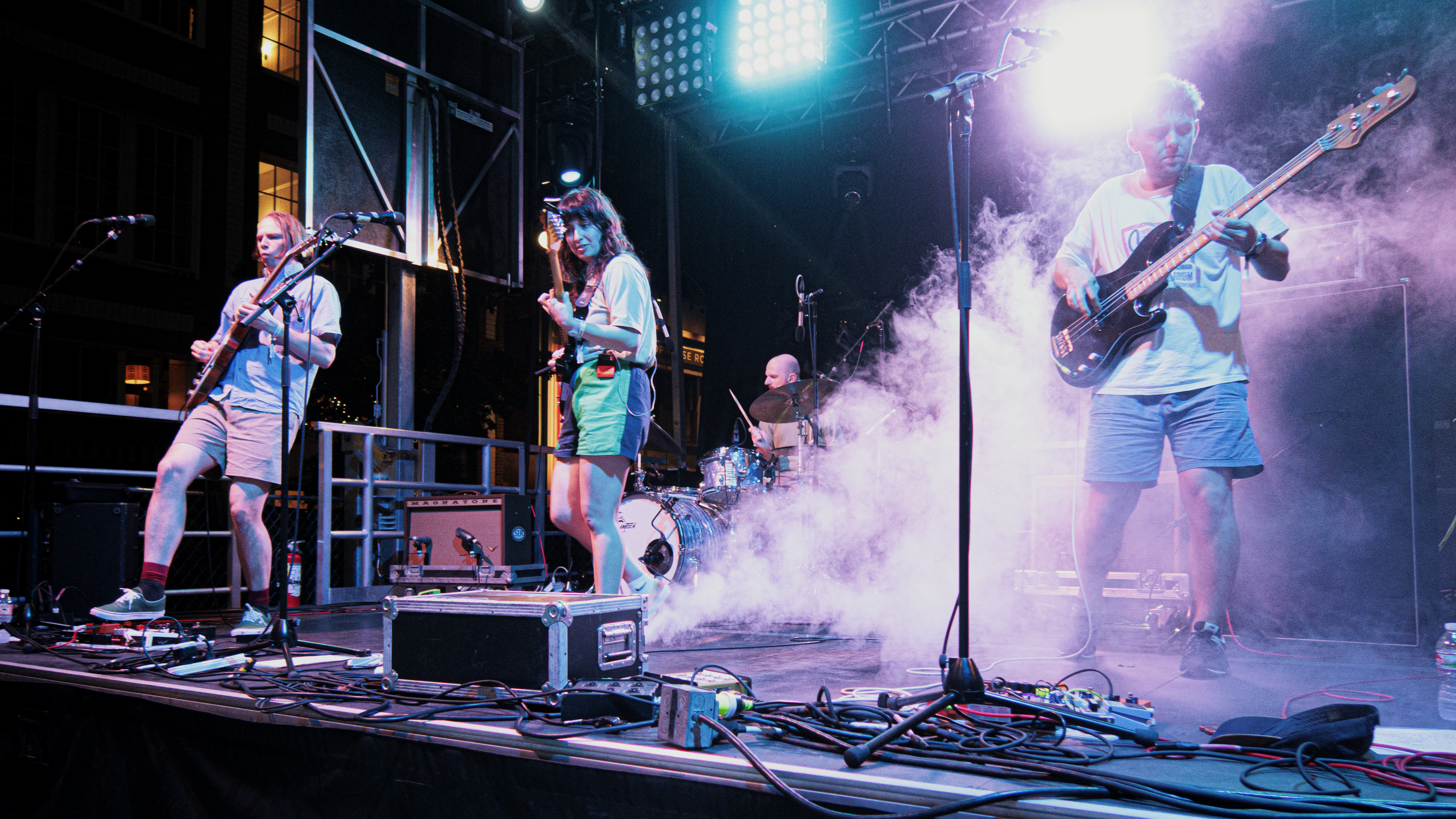
- The Beths performing at the Capitol Hill Block Party in 2022

Background information
- Origin: Auckland, New Zealand
- Genres: Indie rock; indie pop; power pop
- Works: Discography
- Years active: 2014–present
- Labels: Carpark; Ivy League; Anti-
- Members: Elizabeth Stokes; Jonathan Pearce; Benjamin Sinclair; Tristan Deck
- Past members: Ivan Luketina-Johnston
- Website: thebeths.com

The Beths are a New Zealand indie rock band, formed in Auckland in 2014. The group principally consists of lead vocalist Elizabeth Stokes, guitarist Jonathan Pearce, bassist Benjamin Sinclair, and drummer Tristan Deck. Meeting at the University of Auckland, the band signed to Carpark Records in 2018, where they have released the albums Future Me Hates Me (2018), Jump Rope Gazers (2020), Expert in a Dying Field (2022), and Straight Line Was a Lie (2025). They have toured internationally with Death Cab for Cutie, the National, and Spoon.

== History ==
=== 2014–2016: Formation and the Warm Blood EP ===
Elizabeth Stokes and Jonathan Pearce originally met in high school, and they met both Benjamin Sinclair and drummer Ivan Luketina-Johnston when all four attended classes at the University of Auckland, studying jazz. Prior to the Beths, Luketina-Johnston was performing swing under the moniker of Sal Valentine; Stokes, Pearce and Sinclair were all part of his backing band, the Babyshakes, for various tenures. The Beths were formed in late 2014 and released their first single "Idea/Intent" via SoundCloud in July 2015. Stokes said that she named the band after herself, inspired by how the Gilmore Girls character Lorelai Gilmore named her daughter after herself. In March 2016, the band independently released their debut EP, Warm Blood. The EP spawned a single, "Whatever", which was released with an accompanying music video in May 2016.

The Beths have received financial support from the New Zealand Music Commission and NZ On Air. The latter helped fund the group as early as September 2015 for the single and video for "Whatever". In May 2016, they also funded the video for "Lying in the Sun". Through their Outward Sound program, the New Zealand Music Commission funded three tours as part of their international music market development grants.

=== 2017–2019: Future Me Hates Me and Luketina-Johnston's departure ===
A new single, "Great No One", was released in October 2017. The song was the first to be lifted from the band's debut album, Future Me Hates Me. Prior to the album's release in 2018, the band announced their signing to Carpark Records in the U.S. (who also reissued Warm Blood internationally) and to Dew Process in Australia. The album was released globally on 10 August 2018, followed by an international tour in support of the release. The title track was nominated as one of five finalists for the 2018 Silver Scroll award in New Zealand.

In November 2018, the band announced the forthcoming release of a new seven-inch single, "Have Yourself a Merry Little Christmas". The vinyl features the band's cover of the traditional title track, as well as a demo version of their song "Happy Unhappy". "Happy Unhappy" was later named 2018's "song of the summer" by Rolling Stone magazine.

In 2018, Luketina-Johnston permanently departed from the band. He later became a senior scholar at the University of Auckland. The band went through a series of fill-in drummers before settling on Tristan Deck as a permanent member in 2019. Early that year, the band undertook a tour of the UK and Europe supporting Death Cab for Cutie.

=== 2020–2024: Jump Rope Gazers and Expert in a Dying Field ===
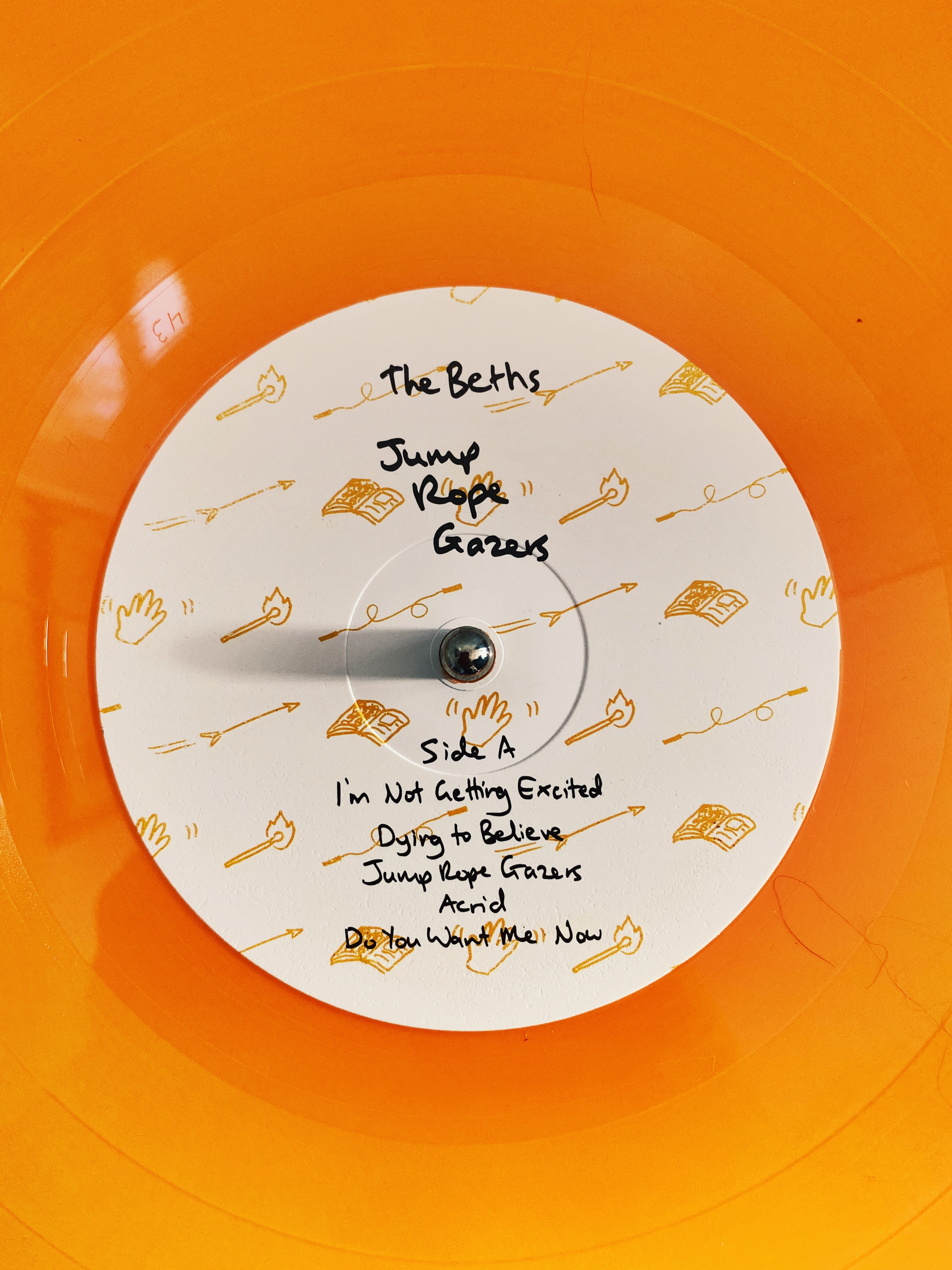
Label art for Jump Rope Gazers

Their second studio album, Jump Rope Gazers, was released in July 2020. On 13 June 2022, the single "Silence Is Golden" was released with the announcement of their third album, Expert in a Dying Field, which was released on 16 September 2022. One year later, it received a deluxe edition which included two previously released singles: "A Real Thing" from 9 February 2022 and "Watching the Credits" from 28 March 2023. The latter was later featured by former U.S. president Barack Obama on his 2023 summer playlist.

=== 2025–present: Straight Line Was a Lie ===
On 28 April 2025, the band released the single "Metal", as well as announcing their signing to Anti-. On 24 June 2025, the band released the single "No Joy", alongside the announcement of their next album Straight Line Was a Lie. The album released on 29 August 2025.

The Beths appeared on the New Zealand panel show 7 Days in February 2026. The next month, they collaborated with Duck Island Ice Cream to produce "Straight Lime Was a Lie", a lime and vanilla flavour.

== Musical style and influences ==
Musically, the Beths have been frequently described as indie rock, indie pop, and power pop. Additionally, they have been noted for their use of vocal harmony, utilizing the voices of all four band members. Members of the band have cited Alvvays, Rilo Kiley, and Bully as inspirations for their work.

== Band members ==
=== Current members ===
- Elizabeth Stokes – lead vocals, rhythm guitar, triangle (2014–present)
- Jonathan Pearce – lead guitar, backing vocals, recorder (2014–present)
- Benjamin Sinclair – bass, backing vocals, recorder, flute (2014–2018, 2018–present)
- Tristan Deck – drums, backing vocals, percussion, xylophone (2019–present; touring musician 2018–2019)

=== Former members ===
- Ivan Luketina-Johnston – drums, backing vocals, percussion (2014–2018)

=== Former touring musicians ===
- Katie Everingham – drums, backing vocals (2018)
- Chris Pearce – bass, backing vocals (2018)
- Adam Tobeck – drums, backing vocals, percussion (2018)

== Discography ==
Studio albums

- Future Me Hates Me (2018)
- Jump Rope Gazers (2020)
- Expert in a Dying Field (2022)
- Straight Line Was a Lie (2025)
