= Corrella =

New Zealand band

- Origin: Belmont, Auckland, New Zealand
- Genres: Pacific reggae; pop
- Years active: 2017–present
- Label: Loop Recordings
- Members: Ngawaiwera Campbell; Pipiwharauroa Campbell; Joshua Faletutulu; Taula Schuster; Te Naawe Tupe; Eli Wilson
- Past members: Rebekah Brady; Moresby Kainuku; Tom Scrase; Codi Wehi-Ngatai

Corrella is an eight-member New Zealand roots reggae band. Formed in 2017 by members of the Royal New Zealand Navy in the North Shore, Auckland, suburb of Belmont, the group came to prominence in New Zealand in 2023 with the single "Blue Eyed Māori". Lead singer Pipiwharauroa Campbell grew up speaking Māori as his first language, and the band has released two songs in te reo Māori, "Raumati" (2022) and "Ko Au (I Am Me)" (2023).

== Biography ==
Corrella was formed in 2017 in Belmont on the North Shore of Auckland, among members of the Royal New Zealand Navy serving at the Devonport Naval Base. The band's name is a reference to the navy personnel housing on Corrella Road in Belmont where the band members practised. The group is predominantly Māori, with some members who are Pasifika and Pākehā. The original line-up featured guitarist Moresby Kainuku, who was also involved with the Navy.

The group debuted in 2020 with the single "Summertime in Aotearoa". Originally planning to release their debut album in the same year, the COVID-19 pandemic delayed these plans, and instead the group released their debut extended play, Corrella EP, in 2021.

In 2023, the band released the song "Ko Au (I Am Me)", the group's second song recorded in Māori. The song was written by lead singer Pipiwharauroa Campbell about his own experiences with rediscovering pride in his cultural identity. The song topped the te reo Māori singles chart in New Zealand.

Corrella released their debut album Road from 26 in May 2023. The song "Blue Eyed Māori" became a sleeper hit in New Zealand, reaching number one on the New Zealand artists' singles chart, and became one of the most aired and streamed songs in New Zealand for 2023.

== Artistry ==
The band's songs are primarily written by Pipiwharauroa Campbell and Te Naawe Tupe. Many of their songs are inspired by their experiences as Navy personnel on overseas tours.

== Personal lives ==
Band members Ngawaiwera and Pipiwharauroa Campbell are siblings, who were raised in Tauranga speaking Māori as their first language, learning English at school. The Campbells' cousin is singer Stan Walker, who was their next-door neighbour growing up.

Pipiwharauroa Campbell worked at Te Taua Moana Marae at the Devonport Naval Base, and currently is a cultural advisor. Drummer Tom "Ulu" Scrase is originally from Wellington, while Te Naawe Tupe is from Whakatāne. Rebekah Brady, originally from Papakura, worked as a drama and dance teacher at Diocesan School for Girls, ACG Strathallan, and managed performing arts programmes at Wellington Region schools Tawa Intermediate School and Hutt Intermediate School. Taulu Schuster is a church minister in South Auckland,.

== Band members ==
- Rebekah Brady (Te Arawa, Ngāpuhi) – vocalist
- Ngawaiwera Campbell (Ngāi Te Rangi, Ngāti He, Ngāti Pūkenga) – vocalist
- Pipiwharauroa Campbell (Ngāi Te Rangi, Ngāti He, Ngāti Pūkenga) – lead singer
- Joshua Faletutulu – lead guitarist
- Taula Schuster (Samoan, Niuean) – piano, keyboard
- Tom "Ulu" Scrase – drummer and taonga pūoro performer
- Te Naawe Tupe (Ngāi Tūhoe) – rhythm guitarist, hype man

== Discography ==
=== Studio albums ===
List of albums, with selected details
Title	Details	Peak chart positions
Title	Details	NZ Artists
Road from 26	Released: 26 May 2023; Format: Digital download, streaming; Label: Loop Recordings	7
Skeletons	Released: 29 November 2024; Format: Digital download, streaming; Label: Loop Recordings	9

=== Extended plays ===
List of albums, with selected details
Title	Details	Peak chart positions
Title	Details	NZ Artists
Corrella EP	Released: 19 May 2021; Format: Digital download, streaming; Label: Loop	— (Note: The Corrella EP did not enter the NZ Artists Top 20 Albums Chart on release, but peaked at number 13 on the NZ Artists Catalogue Albums Chart.)

=== Singles ===
Title	Year	Peak chart positions		Certifications	Album
Title	Year	NZ	NZ Artist	Certifications	Album
"Summertime in Aotearoa"	2020	—	— (Note: "Summertime in Aotearoa" did not enter the NZ Artists Top 20 Singles Chart, but peaked at number 15 on the NZ Artists Hot Singles Chart.)	RMNZ: Gold	Corrella EP
"Chur Māori"	2021	—	— (Note: "Chur Māori" did not enter the NZ Artists Top 20 Singles Chart, but peaked at number 17 on the NZ Artists Hot Singles Chart.)	RMNZ: Platinum	Corrella EP
"Seafarer"	2022	—	—		Non-album singles
"Local Stranger"	2022	—	—		Non-album singles
"We On"	2022	—	—		Non-album singles
"Raumati"	2022	—	—		Non-album singles
"Skankin"	2022	—	—	RMNZ: Gold	Road from 26
"Little Circles"	2023	—	—		Road from 26
"Ko Au (I Am Me)"	2023	—	— (Note: "Ko Au (I Am Me)" did not enter the NZ Artists Top 20 Singles Chart, but peaked at number 7 on the NZ Artists Hot Singles Chart.)		Road from 26
"Whisky"	2023	—	— (Note: "Whisky" did not enter the NZ Artists Top 20 Singles Chart, but peaked at number 12 on the NZ Artists Hot Singles Chart.)		Road from 26
"Blue Eyed Māori"	2023	5	1	RMNZ: 4× Platinum	Road from 26
"Lady Divine"	2023	— (Note: "Lady Divine" did not enter the NZ Top 40 Singles Chart, but peaked at number 18 on the Hot Singles Chart.)	— (Note: "Lady Divine" did not enter the NZ Artists Top 20 Singles Chart, but peaked at number 5 on the NZ Artists Hot Singles Chart.)		Road from 26
"How Will I Know"	2024	— (Note: "How Will I Know" did not enter the NZ Top 40 Singles Chart, but peaked at number 18 on the NZ Hot Singles Chart.)	—	RMNZ: Platinum	Skeletons
"All There Is"	2024	—	—		Skeletons
"We Belong" (with L.A.B.)	2025	— (Note: "We Belong" did not enter the NZ Top 40 Singles Chart, but peaked at number 9 on the NZ Hot Singles Chart.)	—		Te Matatini 2025
"Kua Kotahi Rā"	2025	— (Note: "Kua Kotahi Rā" did not enter the NZ Top 40 Singles Chart, but peaked at number 23 on the NZ Hot Singles Chart.)	—		Te Matatini 2025
"Not I"	2026	— (Note: "Not I" did not enter the NZ Top 40 Singles Chart, but peaked at number 20 on the NZ Hot Singles Chart.)	—		Non-album single
"—" denotes a recording that did not chart.

=== Other charted songs ===
Title	Year	Peak chart positions		Album
Title	Year	NZ Hot	NZ Artist Hot	Album
"Vision"	2023	—	20	Road from 26
"Cookie"	2024	36	—	Skeletons
