= 2b S.Pacific =

1998 album by Che Fu

Studio album by Che Fu
- Released: October 1998
- Studio: The Hut (Auckland)
- Genres: Hip-hop; R&B
- Length: 55:02
- Label: BMG
- Producers: Che Fu; Submariner; Chong Nee

Che Fu chronology
2b S.Pacific (1998)	Navigator (2001)

Singles from 2b S.Pacific
- 1. "Chains" Released: 1996; 2. "Scene III" Released: 1998; 3. "Without a Doubt" / "Machine Talk" Released: 1998; 4. "Waka" Released: 1999

2b S.Pacific is the debut solo album by New Zealand musician Che Fu. Released through BMG in October 1998, it reached No. 2 on the New Zealand charts.

== Background and development ==
Che Fu's decision to embark on a solo career came after being kicked out of the band Supergroove, of which he had been a member for eight years. He presented executives at record label BMG with his plans to sing on top of East Coast rap beats but was instead interpreted as wanting to make a reggae album. Unsure as to how to promote reggae, the label sent him and fellow New Zealand rap musician DLT to New York to develop a more straightforward direction for the project. The two had previously collaborated on the New Zealand chart-topping song "Chains" and began work on more songs together after returning to New Zealand. However, amicable creative differences led to Che working with DJ Andy "Submariner" Morton for most of 2b S.Pacific instead. He did not aspire for a globally successful album as much as one that properly represented his country and culture. The two worked on the album at Morton's small Auckland studio, The Hut, over a three-year period which included many arduous overnight sessions. Chong Nee and Che himself contributed to production alongside Morton. BMG ultimately released the album in October 1998, its title stemming from Che's desire for it to represent an address.

== Songs ==
2b S.Pacific is primarily a hip-hop and R&B album but contains a variety of musical styles. "Chains" was released as a single in 1996 prior to the official album promotion campaign and contains lyrics against French nuclear testing. The proper lead single, "Scene III," was released in 1998 and peaked at No. 4 in New Zealand. Double A-side "Without a Doubt" / "Machine Talk" was released the same year, "Without a Doubt" being a "slick R&B track" and "Machine Talk" having electro-funk stylings. It became the second single from 2b S.Pacific to top the New Zealand charts. "Waka" was released as the album's final single in 1999 and reached No. 6 in the New Zealand charts. Based around a hip-hop beat, the song features guest vocals from Teremoana Rapley and Cook Island drums. Other tracks from the album which were not released as singles include the soul and funk-based "Hoodies" as well as the reggae album closer "Trust." Che's upbringing in the Auckland suburb of Ponsonby and the influence of his father Tigilau Ness during that time, the Dawn Raids, and marijuana are among the topics discussed in the album's lyrics.

== Accolades and impact ==
At the 1999 New Zealand Music Awards, 2b S.Pacific and those involved with its creation garnered four nominations: Best Engineer (Morton), Best Producer (Che Fu and Morton), Album of the Year, and Single of the Year ("Scene III"), with the latter winning its category. In the years since its release, Morton and former BMG A&R assistant Philip Bell have noted the impact of the album on the New Zealand hip hop scene.

== Track listing ==
Track listing and credits adapted from Spotify. All tracks written by Che Fu, except where noted.

No.	Title	Writer(s)	Length
1.	"Intro"		1:04
2.	"Waka"		3:40
3.	"Hoodies"		3:46
4.	"Brainfighta"	Che Fu; T. V. M. Ceeze	4:20
5.	"Touch the Floor"		3:56
6.	"Machine Talk"		3:31
7.	"The Mish"	Che Fu; Ceeze	4:07
8.	"Rain on the Roof"		4:58
9.	"Without a Doubt"		4:06
10.	"Scene III"		4:38
11.	"Hold Your Ground"		3:38
12.	"True Balance"		4:16
13.	"Chains" (with DLT)	Angus McNaughton; Che Fu; Darryl Thomson	4:51
14.	"Trust"		4:04
Total length:			55:02

== Charts ==
Chart (1998)	Peak position
New Zealand Albums (RMNZ)	2
