= Slave & Otis =

New Zealand hip hop MCs and television presenters

- Born: Mark James Williams; 1971 (age 54–55); Otis Frizzell; 1971 (age 54–55)
- Other names: MC OJ & Rhythm Slave, Joint Force, Opto (Frizzell)
- Occupations: Slave: MC, TV presenter, radio host, record producer Otis: MC, TV presenter, radio host, graffiti artist, tattoo artist, graphic designer, chef
- Known for: MC OJ & Rhythm Slave, Joint Force, Mo' Show

Mark James "Slave" Williams (born 1971) and Otis Frizzell (born 1971) are a New Zealand duo known as hip hop MCs and television and radio presenters. Together they are known for their musical work in the 1990s as MC OJ & Rhythm Slave and Joint Force, and their radio and television work in later years.

As well as their work as a duo, each is known for his own achievements. Otis Frizzell, son of pop-artist Dick Frizzell, is a graffiti artist, sometimes working under the name Opto. With his wife Sarah Frizzell, he also runs an acclaimed taco truck in Auckland. As MC Slave, Mark Williams produces and MCs with Wellington group Fat Freddy's Drop.

== MC OJ & Rhythm Slave ==
The duo's first creative collaboration was as hip hop duo MC OJ & Rhythm Slave, best known for their 1990 single "That's The Way (Positivity)", based around a sample from "That's the Way (I Like It)" by KC and the Sunshine Band. The pair met at Selwyn College in the late '80s and started performing together, playing at house parties and getting minor gigs. They were signed to Murray Cammick's Southside Records and released their first single, "That's The Way (Positivity)" in 1990, reaching #12 in the charts. Further singles included "Money Worries" with guest vocals from Push Push frontman Mikey Havoc; and safe sex anthem "Body Rhymes (Protect Yourself)" with guest vocals from Teremoana Rapley of Moana and the Moahunters.

== Joint Force ==
In the mid 1990s, Mark and Otis teamed up with DJ and producer DLT of Upper Hutt Posse and formed the hip hop group Joint Force. They released the One Inch Punch EP in 1995 on BMG records. The trio (along with director Josh Frizzell) also made an ambitious two-part video for their single "Static", that was nominated for Best Music Video at the 1996 New Zealand Music Awards. With the track remixed by Mario Caldato, Jr., "Static (part 1)" was based around a stylish, Tarantino-inspired crime drama, with little focus on the song itself. "Static (part 2)" was a basic video of the trio performing the song in a dark studio.

This was the duo's last project as hip hop performers, though the pair remained active in the New Zealand hip hop community. Slave produced the 1998 compilation album Aotearoa Hip Hop Vol 1 and was a regular host of the Aotearoa hip hop summit.

== Radio ==
In 1994, Slave was approached by bFM radio station manager Graeme Hill to put together a weekly hip hop show, along with DJ Sir-Vere, Bass and DLT. This became the long-running True School Hip Hop Show. Together Mark and Otis were the long-running hosts of their radio show Slave and Otis, the Wednesday Drive show on bFM. In 2004 the duo moved to host the breakfast show on Auckland station Base FM.

== Mo' Show ==
From 2001 to 2003, Mark and Otis starred in their own TV series, Mo' Show on TV2. Inspired by hip hop culture, the duo travelled around the world with digital cameras, exploring places and meeting interesting and creative people, including celebrities. The series was nominated for Best Entertainment Series at the 2002 New Zealand Television Awards, and won in the same category at the 2003 awards.

== Other work ==
At the 2014 New Zealand Music Awards, Slave and Otis presented the Legacy Award to funk-rock group Supergroove.

== Discography ==
=== Albums as MC OJ & Rhythm Slave ===
Year	Title	Details	Peak chart positions
Year	Title	Details	NZ
1991	What Can We Say?	Label: Southside Records; Catalogue: L 30660	—

=== Singles as MC OJ & Rhythm Slave ===
Year	Title	Peak chart positions	Album
Year	Title	NZ	Album
1990	"That's The Way (Positivity)"	12	What Can We Say?
1991	"Money Worries"	36	What Can We Say?
1991	"Body Rhymes (Protect Yourself)"	—	What Can We Say?
1992	"Joined at the Hip Hop"	—	What Can We Say?
"—" denotes a recording that did not chart or was not released in that territory.

=== EPs as Joint Force ===
Year	Title	Details	Peak chart positions
Year	Title	Details	NZ
1995	One Inch Punch	Label: BMG; Catalogue: 74321 273 202; Format: CD	21
1995	Burntime Style Remix	Label: BMG; Catalogue: JOINT1; Format: 12" vinyl	—

=== Singles as Joint Force ===
Year	Title	Peak chart positions	Album
Year	Title	NZ	Album
1995	"Static"	21	One Inch Punch EP
"—" denotes a recording that did not chart or was not released in that territory.

== Awards ==
Year	Nominee / work	Award	Result
1992	MC OJ & Rhythm Slave - What Can We Say?	1992 NZ Music Awards - Album of the Year	Nominated
1992	Dick Frizzell - What Can We Say?	1992 NZ Music Awards - Best Cover	Nominated
1996	Otis Frizzell	1996 NZ Music Awards - Most Promising Male Vocalist	Nominated
1996	Joint Force	1996 NZ Music Awards - Most Promising Group	Nominated
1996	M Noonan and J Frizzell - "Static (Part 1)"	1996 NZ Music Awards - Best Video	Nominated
2002	Mo' Show	2002 NZ Television Awards - Best Entertainment Series	Nominated
2003	Mo' Show	2003 NZ Television Awards - Best Entertainment Series	Won
2009	Otis Frizzell - Dr Boondigga and the Big BW	2009 NZ Music Awards - Best Cover	Nominated
