= Great Mixes =

GreatMixes

Remix album by Supergroove
- Released: 1994
- Genre: Rock; Funk rock
- Label: RCA Records

Supergroove chronology
Traction (1994)	GreatMixes (1994)	Tractor (EP) (1995)

GreatMixes is a remix album released by Supergroove in 1994 to capitalise on the band's success generated by their hit album Traction and the following they had attracted worldwide from their live performances.

Whilst only a stopgap release, it was remixed by the New Zealand hip hop artist DLT. Following Great Mixes, DLT released an album, The Tru School, containing a New Zealand No. 1 single, "Chains", featuring Che Fu, who was returning the favour for the work done on Great Mixes (this single is seen as one of the catalysts that led to Fu leaving the band before the recording of Backspacer).

== Track listing ==
1. Platinum Blondes
2. Bloody Shame
3. Screwdriver
4. Hoopla
5. Depth Bomb
6. Platinum Blonde (Instrumental)
7. Screwdriver (Instrumental)
