= Sitting Inside My Head =

Single by Supergroove

from the album Traction
- B-side: "Five Word Headline"
- Released: 1994
- Studio: York Street (Auckland)
- Genre: Funk rock
- Length: 3:29
- Label: BMG
- Songwriters: Joe Lonie; Karl Steven
- Producers: Karl Steven; Malcolm Welsford

Supergroove singles chronology
"Can't Get Enough" (1994)	"Sitting Inside My Head" (1994)	"If I Had My Way" (1996)

"Sitting Inside My Head" is a song by New Zealand funk rock band Supergroove from their debut studio album, Traction (1994). Released through BMG in 1994 as the album's fourth and final single, the track peaked at No. 6 on the New Zealand singles chart and became the 34th best-selling single of 1994 in the country.

== Composition and development ==
"Sitting Inside My Head" is a funk rock song written in the key of E major, incorporating distorted horns and lead vocals by Che Fu. Karl Steven, the song's co-writer and co-producer, has described its initial form without Che Fu's contribution as "quite bad." However, after the latter successfully asked to contribute to the song during its recording session, it grew to become Steven's favourite Supergroove song. Band member Joe Lonie directed a music video to accompany the track, which includes footage of Che Fu (and the rest of the band) recorded on a North Shore beach, as well as walking down Queen Street.

== Track listing ==
New Zealand cassette single

1. "Sitting Inside My Head"
2. "The Pheoiajuwon"
3. "Five Word Headline"

Australian CD single

1. "Sitting Inside My Head"
2. "The Pheoiajuwon"
3. "Five Word Headline"
4. "The Version Remix"

== Personnel ==
Supergroove

- Nick Atkinson – saxophone
- Che Fu – vocals
- Joe Lonie – bass, songwriting
- Paul Russell – drums
- Ben Sciascia – guitar, typesetting, design
- Karl Steven – vocals, keyboards, samples, production, songwriting
- Tim Stewart – trumpet

Additional personnel

- Don Bartley – mastering
- Nick Treacy – engineering assistance
- Polly Walker – photography
- Malcolm Welsford – production, engineering

== Charts ==
=== Weekly charts ===
Chart (1994)	Peak position
New Zealand (Recorded Music NZ)	6

=== Year-end charts ===
Chart (1994)	Position
New Zealand (Recorded Music NZ)	34

== Certifications ==
Region	Certification	Certified units/sales
New Zealand (RMNZ)	4× Platinum	120,000^{‡}
^{‡} Sales+streaming figures based on certification alone.
