= Postage (album) =

Postage: The Best of Supergroove

Greatest hits album by Supergroove
- Released: 2003
- Genre: Rock, funk rock
- Label: BMG

Supergroove chronology
| Backspacer (1996) | Postage: The Best of Supergroove (2003) |

Postage is a greatest hits album by the New Zealand funk rock band Supergroove, released in 2003. In addition to the band's biggest hits, there are a number of songs on the album, predominantly from singles, which had not been previously released on any of the band's earlier albums and EPs. Noticeable inclusions are "Sex Police", "Here Comes the Supergroove", and a new remix by New Zealand hip hop producer P-Money. The album entered the charts at number 10, and was certified gold one week after its release.

The compilation was created at the behest of record label BMG, and the band members felt that enough time had passed for them to have gotten over the hard feelings that had led to the departure of Che Ness and the eventual breakup of the band.

The album received generally positive reviews upon release. Phil McCarthy of the Southland Times said that it "sums up the enormous contribution they made to a stagnating Kiwi music scene in the mid-1990s." Kristian South of the New Zealand Truth described it as "compelling listening", while Russell Baillie in the New Zealand Herald gave it a four-star rating and said that it reflected "how much growing up" Supergroove had done in the course of their "spectacular career". Tracey Cooper of the Waikato Times was more critical, calling it a "rehash" and rating it two stars, while acknowledging that it "might stir a memory or two".

In 2004, Postage won the New Zealand Music Award for Best Album Cover, with cover designer and band member Ben Sciascia taking home the prize.

The original 2003 release included a second disc of remixed tracks and live recordings of some of their most well known songs during their mid 1990s peak. This was deleted the following year and replaced with an abbreviated single disc version.

When the band reformed in 2007 initially to support Crowded House and then for their own tours in 2008 a third version of the album was released with revised packaging and track listing as well as a new bonus disc, a DVD containing 11 of the band's music videos.

== Track listing ==
2003 original release disc 1
| No. | Title | Length |
|---|---|---|
| 1. | "Here Comes the Supergroove" | 3:19 |
| 2. | "You Gotta Know" | 3:36 |
| 3. | "Let the Funk Be Free" | 3:25 |
| 4. | "Soul Time Strikes Back" | 3:13 |
| 5. | "Scorpio Girls" | 3:56 |
| 6. | "Come to the Party" | 5:35 |
| 7. | "Can't Get Enough" | 3:23 |
| 8. | "Sex Police" | 3:37 |
| 9. | "Backspaced" | 4:09 |
| 10. | "Sitting Inside My Head" | 3:30 |
| 11. | "Five Word Headline" | 3:55 |
| 12. | "You Freak Me" | 4:19 |
| 13. | "Sister Sister" | 5:10 |
| 14. | "If I Had My Way" | 4:59 |
| 15. | "For Whatever Remix" | 3:33 |
| 16. | "Missionary Man" | 3:36 |
| 17. | "Next Time" | 3:41 |
| 18. | "5th Wheel" | 5:46 |
| Total length: | | 72:51 |

2003 original release disc 2
| No. | Title | Length |
|---|---|---|
| 1. | "Scorpio Girls (P-Money's Khyber Block Party Mix)" | 3:41 |
| 2. | "Can't Get Enough (Baitercell vs. Timmy Schumacher Radio Boom Schwack Mix)" | 3:24 |
| 3. | "Scorpio Girls (Baitercell vs. Timmy Schumacher Malaysian Stadium Rock Mix)" | 5:46 |
| 4. | "Can't Get Enough (Baitercell vs. Timmy Schumacher Club Boom Schwack Mix)" | 6:48 |
| 5. | "You Gotta Know (Live in Australia 1995)" | 3:44 |
| 6. | "You Freak Me (Live in Australia 1995)" | 4:02 |
| 7. | "Next Time (Live in Holland 1995)" | 4:21 |
| Total length: | | 31:49 |

2004 single disc release
| No. | Title | Length |
|---|---|---|
| 1. | "Here Comes the Supergroove" | 3:19 |
| 2. | "You Gotta Know" | 3:36 |
| 3. | "Let the Funk Be Free" | 3:25 |
| 4. | "Soul Time Strikes Back" | 3:13 |
| 5. | "Scorpio Girls" | 3:56 |
| 6. | "Come to the Party" | 5:35 |
| 7. | "Can't Get Enough" | 3:23 |
| 8. | "Sex Police" | 3:37 |
| 9. | "Sitting Inside My Head" | 3:30 |
| 10. | "Five Word Headline" | 3:55 |
| 11. | "You Freak Me" | 4:19 |
| 12. | "Sister Sister" | 5:10 |
| 13. | "If I Had My Way" | 4:59 |
| 14. | "For Whatever Remix" | 3:33 |
| 15. | "Next Time" | 3:41 |
| 16. | "5th Wheel" | 5:46 |
| 17. | "Scorpio Girls (P-Money's Khyber Block Party Mix)" | 3:41 |
| 18. | "Can't Get Enough (Baitercell vs. Timmy Schumacher Radio Boom Schwack Mix)" | 3:24 |
| 19. | "Scorpio Girls (Baitercell vs. Timmy Schumacher Malaysian Stadium Rock Mix)" | 5:46 |
| Total length: | | 77:58 |

2007 tour edition CD
| No. | Title | Length |
|---|---|---|
| 1. | "Here Comes the Supergroove" | 3:19 |
| 2. | "You Gotta Know" | 3:36 |
| 3. | "Let the Funk Be Free" | 3:25 |
| 4. | "Soul Time Strikes Back" | 3:13 |
| 5. | "Scorpio Girls" | 3:56 |
| 6. | "Come to the Party" | 5:35 |
| 7. | "Can't Get Enough" | 3:23 |
| 8. | "Sex Police" | 3:37 |
| 9. | "Sitting Inside My Head" | 3:30 |
| 10. | "Five Word Headline" | 3:55 |
| 11. | "You Freak Me" | 4:19 |
| 12. | "Sister Sister" | 5:10 |
| 13. | "If I Had My Way" | 4:59 |
| 14. | "For Whatever Remix" | 3:33 |
| 15. | "Next Time" | 3:41 |
| 16. | "5th Wheel" | 5:46 |
| 17. | "You Gotta Know (Live in Australia 1995)" | 3:44 |
| 18. | "You Freak Me (Live in Australia 1995)" | 4:02 |
| 19. | "Next Time (Live in Holland 1995)" | 4:21 |
| Total length: | | 77:14 |

2007 tour edition DVD
| No. | Title | Length |
|---|---|---|
| 1. | "Here Comes the Supergroove" |
| 2. | "You Gotta Know" |
| 3. | "Scorpio Girls" |
| 4. | "Can't Get Enough" |
| 5. | "You Freak Me" |
| 6. | "You Gotta Know (International Version)" |
| 7. | "Next Time" |
| 8. | "If I Had My Way" |
| 9. | "5th Wheel" |
| 10. | "For Whatever Remix" |
