= Fade Away (Che Fu song) =

2001 single by Che Fu

Single by Che Fu

from the album Navigator
- Released: 2001
- Studio: Revolver Studios
- Length: 4:06
- Label: Sony Music
- Songwriter: Che Fu
- Producer: Che Fu

Che Fu singles chronology
"Waka" (1999)	"Fade Away" (2001)	"Random" (2001)

"Fade Away" is a single released by New Zealand hip-hop artist Che Fu, taken from his 2001 sophomore album Navigator. The single entered the charts at number 15 on 13 July 2001, and charted for 22 weeks, peaking at number 2 for 3 weeks. It also reached number 9 on the end-of-year charts.

"Fade Away" was accompanied with a music video and was the debut of Fu's band The Krates, which he formed primarily for studio work and live performances. The single was a commercial and critical success, winning both Best Music Video and Single of the Year at the 2002 NZ Music Awards.

== Background and release ==
Fu wrote the song about his close friend, Eruera (Bobby) Mita. Fu and Mita had both become fathers around the same time, and bonded over the transition into parenthood. The song draws on themes of undying friendship, inspired when Mita moved away.

"Fade Away" was the first single from Navigator, Fu's second solo album. It was recorded at Revolver Studios and engineered by Neil Baldock, who Fu credits for instilling him with confidence during the process. It also marked the debut of The Krates, an eight-piece band Fu assembled for live performances. The single also included remixes of Fade Away by P-Money and Soane.

In 2021, Hemi Kelly helped translate the song into te reo Māori, and Fu performed it as a waiata of remembrance in honour of both Mita and his mother Miriama Rauhihi-Ness, who had both subsequently died. The song, "E Kore E Motu", was the subject of season 1, episode 6, of Waiata Anthems by TVNZ.

== Music video ==
The music video for "Fade Away" was directed by Matthew Metcalfe and Greg Rewai, and filmed at the NZ Warbirds Association hangar at Ardmore Airport. It is set in World War II, depicting band members in military uniform, intending to reflect the lyrical meaning of loyalty and friendship. In addition to Che Fu and The Krates, the video also features P-Money and former Supergroove drummer Paul Russell, as well as Eruera Mita in the opening shots.

== Reception ==
The single entered the charts at number 15 on 13 July 2001, and charted for 22 weeks, peaking at number 2 for 3 weeks. Both the single and album were a commercial success, with Navigator going triple platinum.

=== Critical reception ===
"Fade Away" received positive reviews by critics. Russell Baillie of The New Zealand Herald praised the album and described "Fade Away" as "gently rocking Stevie Wonder-ish reggae-soul", while also complimenting the "rich harmonies" on a live performance of the single. In his book 100 Essential Albums, Nick Bollinger described the single as "passionate and personal" and praised the album overall.

=== Accolades ===
At the 2002 NZ Music Awards, "Fade Away" won Single of the Year, and the music video won Best Music Video. The album, Navigator, also won Best Album.

In 2026, "Fade Away" was ranked 62 in a top 100 list of "New Zealand's most beloved homegrown songs." The listicle was published by RNZ and based on 65,000 online votes and submissions.

== Charts ==
=== Weekly charts ===
Weekly chart performance for "Fade Away"
Chart (2001)	Position
New Zealand (RMNZ)	2

=== Year-end charts ===
Year-end chart performance for "Fade Away"
Chart (2001)	Position
New Zealand (RMNZ)	9

== Certifications ==
Certifications for "Fade Away"
Region	Certification	Certified units/sales
New Zealand (RMNZ)	3× Platinum	90,000^{‡}
^{‡} Sales+streaming figures based on certification alone.
