= Chains (DLT song) =

Single by DLT featuring Che Fu

from the album The True School
- B-side: Chains (Album Mix); Chains (Remix)
- Released: 21 July 1996 (New Zealand)
- Recorded: 1996
- Genre: Hip Hop
- Length: 4:52 (album version); 3:36 (single version)
- Songwriters: Angus McNaughton, Che Ness, Kevin Rangihuna, Darryl L Thomson
- Producer: DLT

DLT singles chronology
"Chains" (1996)	"I'm Your MC" (2000)

Che Fu singles chronology
"Sitting Inside My Head" (1995)	"Chains" (1996)	"Fade Away" (1997)

Music video
- "Chains" at NZ on Screen

"Chains" is a hip hop song by New Zealand DJ DLT featuring singer Che Fu. The song reached number one on the New Zealand charts. It was Che-Fu's first song after leaving Supergroove and marked the beginning of his solo career.

== Development ==
Che-Fu had been asked to feature on the song before his departure from Supergroove. He came to the recording unaware that he needed to write a chorus as well as a verse, and came up with the memorable hook "Come break my chains/Come help me out/Living in the city ain't so bad" on the spot. The lyrics indirectly address the French nuclear testing at the Mururoa islands.

== Chart performance ==
The song debuted on the New Zealand charts at number two, then rose to number one where it remained for five weeks.

=== Year-end charts ===
Chart (1996)	Position
New Zealand (Recorded Music NZ)	4

== Certifications ==
Certifications for "Chains"
Region	Certification	Certified units/sales
New Zealand (RMNZ)	Platinum	30,000^{‡}
^{‡} Sales+streaming figures based on certification alone.

== Awards ==
At the 1997 New Zealand Music Awards "Chains" won Best Single, and Che-Fu was awarded Best Male Vocalist for the song. In 2001 it was listed at number 21 on the APRA Top 100 New Zealand Songs of All Time and it was featured on the Nature's Best compilation album.
