= Teremoana Rapley =

New Zealand rapper

Teremoana Rapley MNZM
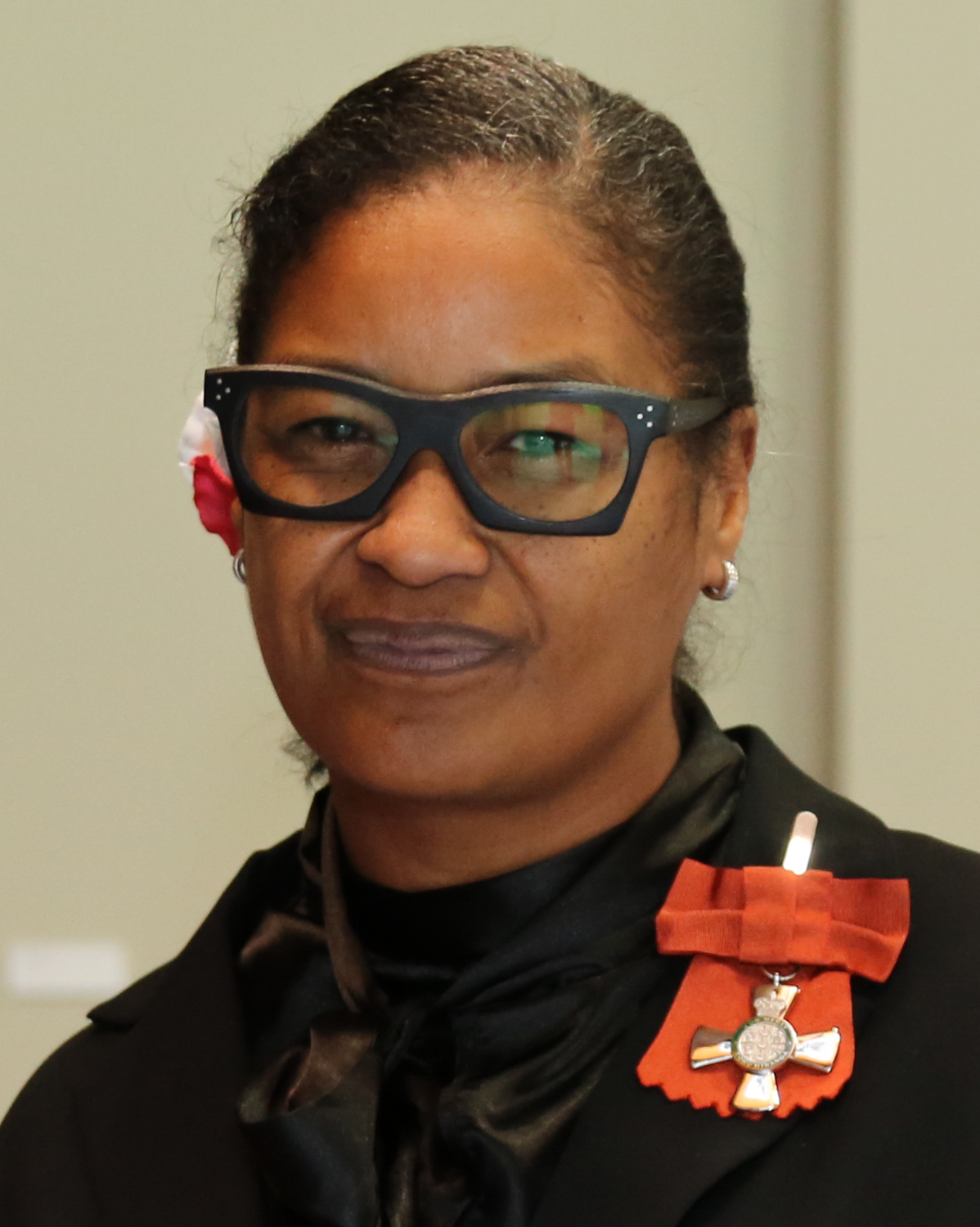
- Rapley in 2022
- Born: 1973 (age 52–53); Upper Hutt, New Zealand
- Occupations: Musical artist, television presenter, television producer
- Years active: 1987–present
- Known for: Upper Hutt Posse, Moana and the Moahunters, What Now, Mai Time
- Website: teremoana.com

Tere Veronica Rapley MNZM (born 1973), generally known as Teremoana Rapley, describes herself as a 'Black Moana Sovereign Storyteller'. Many consider her a hugely influential New Zealand hip-hop artist, musician, television presenter and television producer, best known for her rhymes and vocals in both solo and collaborative work and her significant roles in the 1990s with Upper Hutt Posse and Moana and the Moahunters.

In the 2021 Queen's Birthday Honours, Rapley was appointed a Member of the New Zealand Order of Merit, for services to music and television.

== Biography ==
Rapley joined hip hop group Upper Hutt Posse in 1987, aged 14. She sang on the group's early tracks, including "Stormy Weather" and "Ragga Girl" and featured on the group's 1989 album Against the Flow.

In 1989, Rapley joined Moana Maniapoto's hip hop and pop trio Moana and the Moahunters. The group released two albums, Tahi and Rua and had chart success with many singles, including "Black Pearl", "A.E.I.O.U." and "Peace, Love & Family". Rapley's work with Moana and the Moahunters saw her awarded Most Promising Female Vocalist at the 1992 New Zealand Music Awards. Rapley has spoken of avoiding the commercial music drive to view people and their music as products. She has said "I'm not a product...I make music, music is part of me, there is no separation from self."

In the 1990s, Rapley also provided guest vocals on tracks from other artists, including "Sitting by the Telephone" by Unitone Hi Fi, "Body Rhymes (Protect Yourself)" by MC OJ and Rhythm Slave, "Horified One" by Dam Native and "In Summer" by David Parker.

In 1995, Rapley turned her attentions to a solo career, releasing the singles "Beautiful People" and a cover of the Nina Simone song "Four Women", and was awarded Best Female Vocalist at the 1996 New Zealand Music Awards.

Rapley continued to work from her home studio she had set up since 1992 that started with a Fostex 4-track cassette recorder and Dr.T's music software on Atari 1040ST. She has composed title music for television programmes, commercial music work for Air NZ and Coca-Cola as well as working on tracks for her upcoming album.

Rapley has worked with Bill Urale (stage name: King Kapisi), who is also her husband. She has featured on his singles "Saboteur" and "Lollipop". Teremoana and King Kapisi used to run The Plantation Store, which included Kapisi’ Overstayer clothing range. She also provided guest vocals on the track "Waka," from Che Fu's 1998 debut solo album 2b S.Pacific.

Rapley is also known for her television presenting work. In 1995 she joined long-running New Zealand children's television show What Now as a field reporter. From 1996 to 2001, Teremoana was a presenter on TV2's Māori youth magazine programme Mai Time. Around 2000-2001 she interviewed musicians working for Selector magazine.

After the birth of her fourth and youngest child, Rapley moved permanently behind the camera holding many roles including director, camera operator, editor, scriptwriter, production manager and producer. In 2015, after 10 years of service, Rapley resigned as a producer at the Maori Television Service in Auckland, New Zealand having produced over 1400 television programmes for the station and gained over 3000 production credits to her name. In 2021, Teremoana Rapley featured in a Stories Seldom Told podcast about unconscious bias.

In February 2022, Rapley was diagnosed with an aggressive autoimmune disorder, and later that year, in August and October, she was found to have two inoperable brain tumours. She publicly announced her medical conditions in an interview in April 2024.

At the 2024 Taite Music Prize ceremony she was awarded the Independent Spirit Award.

== Discography ==
=== Singles ===
Year	Title	Peak chart positions	Album
Year	Title	NZ	Album
1995	"Beautiful People"	—	Non-album single
1995	"Four Women"	—	Non-album single
2003	"Life" (with Submariner and Mark de Clive Lowe)	—	Non-album single
2011	"Purerehua"	—	He Rangi Paihuarere
2011	"Dreamswimmer"	—	Ihimaera
"—" denotes a recording that did not chart or was not released in that territory.

=== As featured artist ===
Year	Title	Performing with	Peak chart positions	Album
Year	Title	Performing with	NZ	Album
1992	"Homegirl"	Riot Riddum Sound System	—	Deepgrooves
1992	"Body Rhymes (Protect Yourself)"	MC OJ & Rhythm Slave	—	What Can We Say?
1992	"In Summer I Fall"	David Parker	35	Release
1993	"Sitting by the Phone"	Unitone Hifi	—	Non-album single
1995	"Horified One"	Dam Native	—	Kaupapa Driven Rhymes Uplifted
1996	"Love Has No Name"	Babble	—	Ether
2001	"Saboteur"	King Kapisi	—	Savage Thoughts
2001	"U Say"	Del Rey System	—	Del Rey System
2006	"Lollipop"	King Kapisi	—	Dominant Species
2010	"Superhuman" (featuring The Mint Chicks)	King Kapisi	—	Hip Hop Lives Here
2012	"Won't Stop, Can't Stop"	King Kapisi	—	Hip Hop Lives Here
2013	"Crush" (featuring Rakaa Iriscience)	King Kapisi	—	Hip Hop Lives Here
2014	"Down with the King" (featuring Mr Thing)	King Kapisi	—	Hip Hop Lives Here
2014	"Welcome Back"	King Kapisi	—	Hip Hop Lives Here
"—" denotes a recording that did not chart or was not released in that territory.

== Awards ==
Year	Nominee / work	Award	Result
1989	Upper Hutt Posse	1989 New Zealand Music Awards – Most Promising Group	Nominated
1992	Teremoana Rapley (Moana and the Moahunters)	1992 New Zealand Music Awards – Most Promising Female Vocalist	Won
1996	"Give it Up Now" (Moana and the Moahunters)	1996 New Zealand Music Awards – Best Mana Maori Album	Nominated
1996	"Akona Te Reo '95" (Moana and the Moahunters)	1996 New Zealand Music Awards – Best Mana Reo Album	Nominated
1996	Teremoana Rapley	1996 New Zealand Music Awards – Best Female Vocalist	Won
2014	Teremoana Rapley	2014 Tangireka Music Awards – Cook Islander in Mainstream	Won
2024	Teremoana Rapley	2024 Taite Music Prize – Independent Spirit Award	Won
