= Backspacer (disambiguation) =

Backspacer may refer to:

- Backspacer, an album by Pearl Jam
  - Backspacer Tour, a tour to promote the Pearl Jam album
- Backspacer (Supergroove album)
