= Karl Steven =

New Zealand composer and musician

- Born: Karl Sölve Steven; 1973 (age 52–53)
- Origin: Auckland, New Zealand
- Occupations: musician; songwriter; composer; producer
- Years active: 1989–present
- Formerly of: Supergroove
- Website: karlsolvesteven.com

Karl Sölve Steven (born 1973) is a singer and composer from New Zealand. Starting his career as the frontman for Supergroove in the 90s, Steven later became one of New Zealand's most prominent score composers for television and film, and has won eight APRA Screen Awards.

== Early life and career ==
Steven was born in 1973 and raised in Auckland; his father, Geoff Steven, was a New Zealand filmmaker, and his mother, Carin Svensson, was a Swedish writer. Steven grew up speaking Swedish at home, and his middle name, Sölve, was from his Swedish grandfather, a Lutheran vicar.

At the age of ten, Steven first decided he wanted to be a musician, drawing inspiration from The Blues Brothers and The Talking Heads's Stop Making Sense. At thirteen, he began experimenting with his friend Tim Stewart to create hip hop tracks with a drum machine; the two of them transferred from Western Springs College to Selwyn College, believing that the latter had a better music program.

=== Supergroove ===
At Selwyn, the pair joined with Nick Atkinson to form their first band, "Little Boy Blues", later renamed to "The Lowdown Dirty Blues Band", on New Year's Eve of 1989/1990. The band evolved into Supergroove as the lineup expanded to include Che Ness, Ned Ngatae, Joe Lonie and Paul Russell. Steven dropped out of school in sixth form to pursue a full time music career.

Supergroove released their debut album Traction in 1994, which was produced by Steven with Malcolm Welsford. The album went triple platinum in New Zealand and won five Tūī awards, including Best Producer for Steven and Welsford. Steven and Welsford again won the Best Producer award for Supergroove's second album, Backspacer, released in 1996.

=== Solo career ===
At 21, Steven left Supergroove to study at university, spending six years at Auckland before completing a PhD at Cambridge University.

In February 2022, after years of composing film and television scores, Steven released his debut solo album, All of Human Emotion on Microfiche. The album included a collaboration with former Supergroove bandmate Che Fu on the single "Utterance and Inscription".

== Personal life ==
Steven lives part-time in Thames with his wife, who he has been with since they were teenagers. Together they have a daughter.

== Awards and nominations ==
| Year | Award | Work(s) nominated | Category | Result | Ref. |
|---|---|---|---|---|---|
| 1995 | New Zealand Music Awards | Traction | Best Producer | Won | |
| 1997 | New Zealand Music Awards | Backspacer | Best Producer | Won | |
| 2016 | APRA Screen Awards | 800 Words | Best Original Music in a Series | Won | |
| 2019 | APRA Screen Awards | The Bad Seed | Best Original Music in a Series | Won | |
| 2020 | APRA Screen Awards | Come to Daddy | Best Original Music in a Feature Film | Won | |
| 2021 | APRA Screen Awards | Black Hands | Best Original Music in a Series | Won | |
| 2023 | APRA Screen Awards | The Subtle Art of Not Giving a #@%! | Best Original Music in a Feature Film | Won | |
| 2024 | APRA Screen Awards | Never Look Away | Best Original Music in a Feature Film | Won | |
| 2024 | APRA Screen Awards | Black Coast Vanishings | Best Original Music in a Series | Won | |
| 2024 | New Zealand Television Awards | Black Coast Vanishings | Best Original Score | Nominated | |
| 2025 | Hollywood Music in Media Awards | Mārama | Original Score – Independent Film (Foreign Language) | Nominated | |
| 2026 | APRA Screen Awards | Pike River | Best Original Music in a Feature Film | Won | |
