= Miriama Rauhihi-Ness =

New Zealand Māori activist and social worker

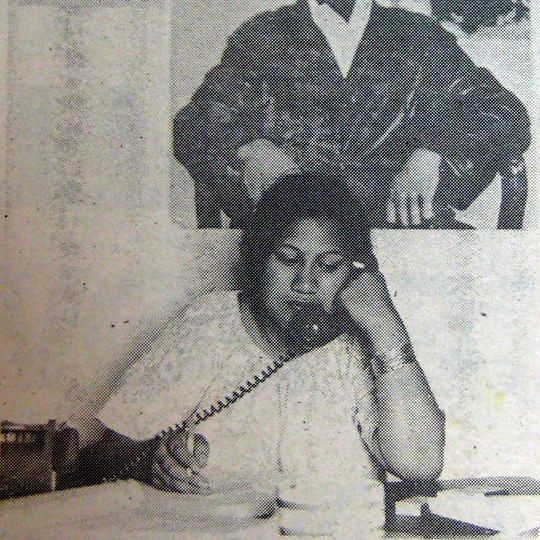
- Rauhihi-Ness in 1977
- Born: 15 July 1951; New Zealand
- Died: 15 March 2021 (aged 69)
- Occupation: Social worker
- Known for: Māori activism
- Spouse: Tigilau Ness (separated)
- Relatives: Che Fu (son)

Miriama Rauhihi-Ness (née Rauhihi; 15 July 1951 – 15 March 2021), also known as Ama Ness, was a New Zealand Māori activist and social worker. She was one of the organisers of the 1975 Māori land march. In 1972, she helped lodge a Māori language petition, eventually culminating in Māori becoming an official language of New Zealand in 1987. She brought the Pacific community of New Zealand together, fighting for the rights of Māori and Pasifika alike.

== Early life ==
Rauhihi was born on 15 July 1951, and was raised in Shannon. Of Māori descent, she affiliated to Ngāti Raukawa ki te Tonga. At age 18, she moved to Ponsonby in Auckland, where she worked in a sewing factory and observed unfair working conditions. Rauhihi was elected union representative, and within six months had organised a strike over unfair working conditions for Pasifika workers.

== Polynesian Panthers ==
Rauhihi joined the Polynesian Panthers in 1971. In 1972, she held the portfolio for culture in the male-dominated Panthers, which had chauvinistic members; as a result she began organising gender equality workshops for the Panthers and men in the community to target cultural bias and violence against women.

In the wake of the strike organised in Ponsonby, she was asked to join the Polynesian Panthers as their first full-time community worker in 1973. Her work in the Panthers primarily involved running the Panther's headquarters, and filtering calls of those needing help, but she also participated in frontline work.

Rauhihi-Ness' participation in the 1975 Māori land march, led by Dame Whina Cooper, is considered pivotal, as she was responsible for organising the logistics of the march and for involving the Panthers. Notably, the march rested at her marae, Poutu Marae in Shannon.

In the aftermath of the 1976 police shooting of Daniel Houpapa, Rauhihi-Ness rallied the Panthers to march to Taumarunui in protest. She also strongly supported the Bastion Point occupation of 1977–1978. During the 1981 Springbok Tour she worked as a marshal, organising opposition to the tour. Although the Panthers disbanded after the Springbok Tour, Rauhihi-Ness continued her community work until her death.

== Other work ==
Rauhihi-Ness was part of the 1973 Māori delegation to China alongside names such as Hone Tuwhare, and Tāme Iti, which studied Chinese minority groups. She also joined Ngā Tamatoa, a Māori activist group similar to the Polynesian Panthers, and contributed towards making the Māori language an official language of New Zealand through her involvement in a petition that amassed over 30,000 signatures.

== Personal life ==
Rauhihi married musician Tigilau Ness, whom she had met during her time with the Polynesian Panthers, and gave birth to musician Che Fu. The couple later separated. Rauhihi-Ness died on 15 March 2021 from cancer at the age of 69, having been diagnosed only weeks earlier. She was buried at Waikumete Cemetery, Auckland.
