= Western Springs, New Zealand =

Western Springs
- Suburb
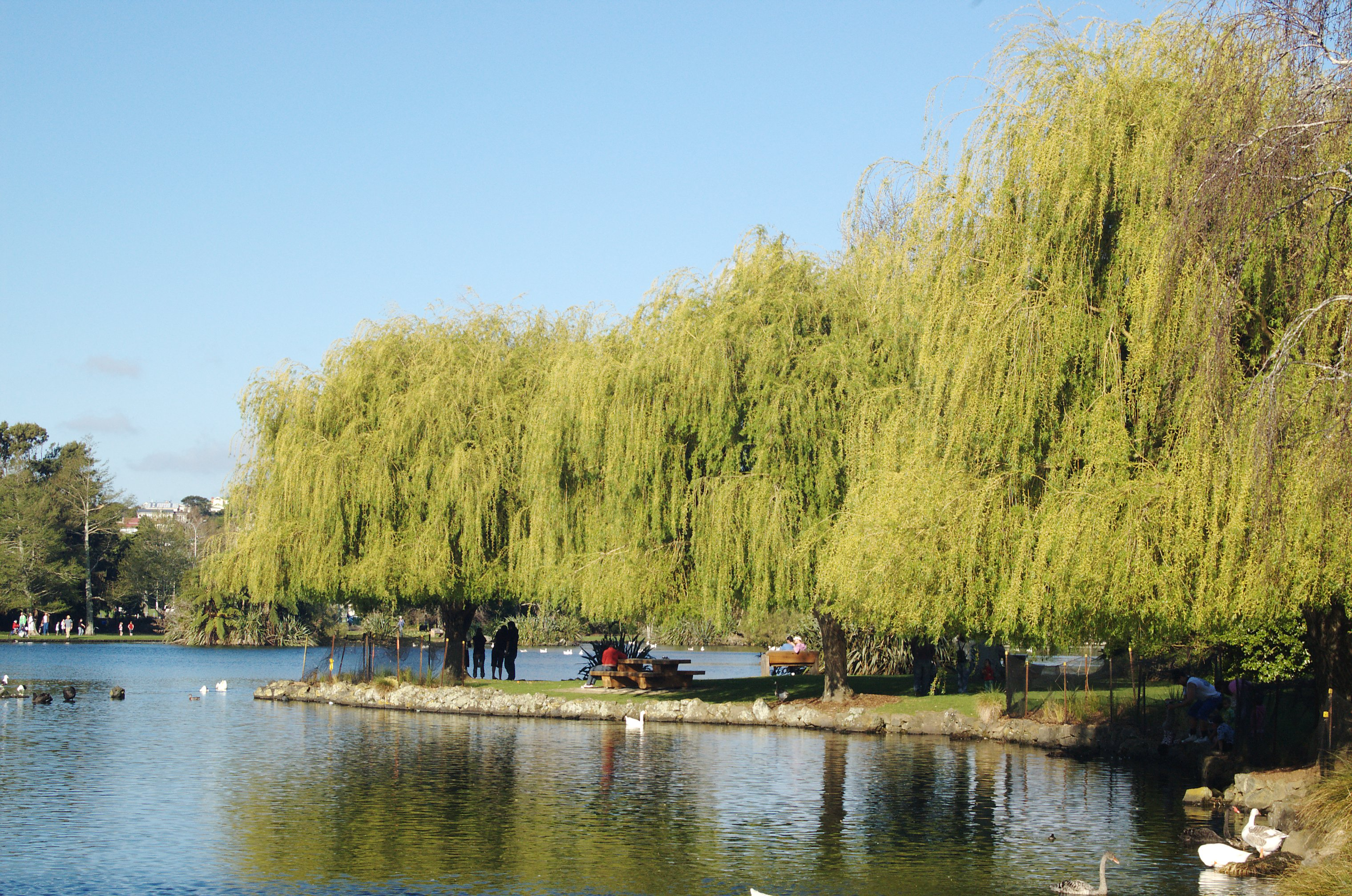
- Willows and the artificial lake in Western Springs Lakeside Te Wai Ōrea, looking east.
- Interactive map of Western Springs
- Coordinates: 36.867°S 174.723°E
- Country: New Zealand
- City: Auckland
- Local authority: Auckland Council
- Electoral ward: Waitematā and Gulf ward
- Local board: Waitematā Local Board

Area
  - Land: 202 ha (500 acres)

Population (June 2025)
  - Total: 2,990
  - Density: 1,480/km^{2} (3,830/sq mi)
- Postcode: 1022

Point Chevalier	Westmere	Grey Lynn
Point Chevalier	Western Springs	Grey Lynn
Mount Albert	Mount Albert	Morningside

Western Springs is a residential suburb in the city of Auckland in the north of New Zealand. It is located four kilometres to the west of the city centre, Auckland CBD. The park is situated to the north of State Highway 16 and the residential suburb is located southeast of the park on the opposite side of State Highway 16.

The suburb is dominated by Western Springs Reserve, also known as Western Springs Lakeside Te Wai Ōrea, which features a lake with a variety of birdlife. Auckland Zoo, Western Springs Stadium and M.O.T.A.T. (the Museum of Transport and Technology) are situated around the park. The park is the location of the annual Pasifika Festival, one of Auckland's most popular public events. Across the road from the zoo is the school of Western Springs College, with a student population of around 1,758.

== History ==
=== Māori history ===
Historically, Māori valued the wetlands they named Te Wai Ōrea, meaning 'the waters of eels', for the clean, clear spring water and ōrea or New Zealand long fin eels that lived in the stream. A traditional Māori story involves Ruarangi, a chief of the supernatural Patupaiarehe people, escaping a siege on Owairaka / Mount Albert through lava tunnels and emerging at Te Wai Ōrea.

During a battle fought in the area, Kawharu, a Manukau Māori warrior chief, fought local iwi at a ridge site overlooking Te Wai Ōrea named Te Raeokawharu (Kawharu’s brow), where Surrey Crescent is situated today.

=== Post-European arrival ===
In 1830-40, during the Māori musket wars, Ngati Tahinga, Waiohua and Te Taou lived in the wider area, which was named Te Rehu. Following the signing of the Treaty of Waitangi in 1840, soon-to-be Governor William Hobson purchased from Ngati Whātua Ōrākei a block of land of the Tāmaki isthmus to found New Zealand's new capital city Auckland, the first of multiple. The land that is now Western Springs was purchased by the Crown in June 1841, as part of a larger block running from modern-day Westmere westwards to Te Atatu and down to Blockhouse Bay. Early settlers referred to the area as the "Western Spring" to differentiate it from the springs in Pukekawa / Auckland Domain east of early Auckland.

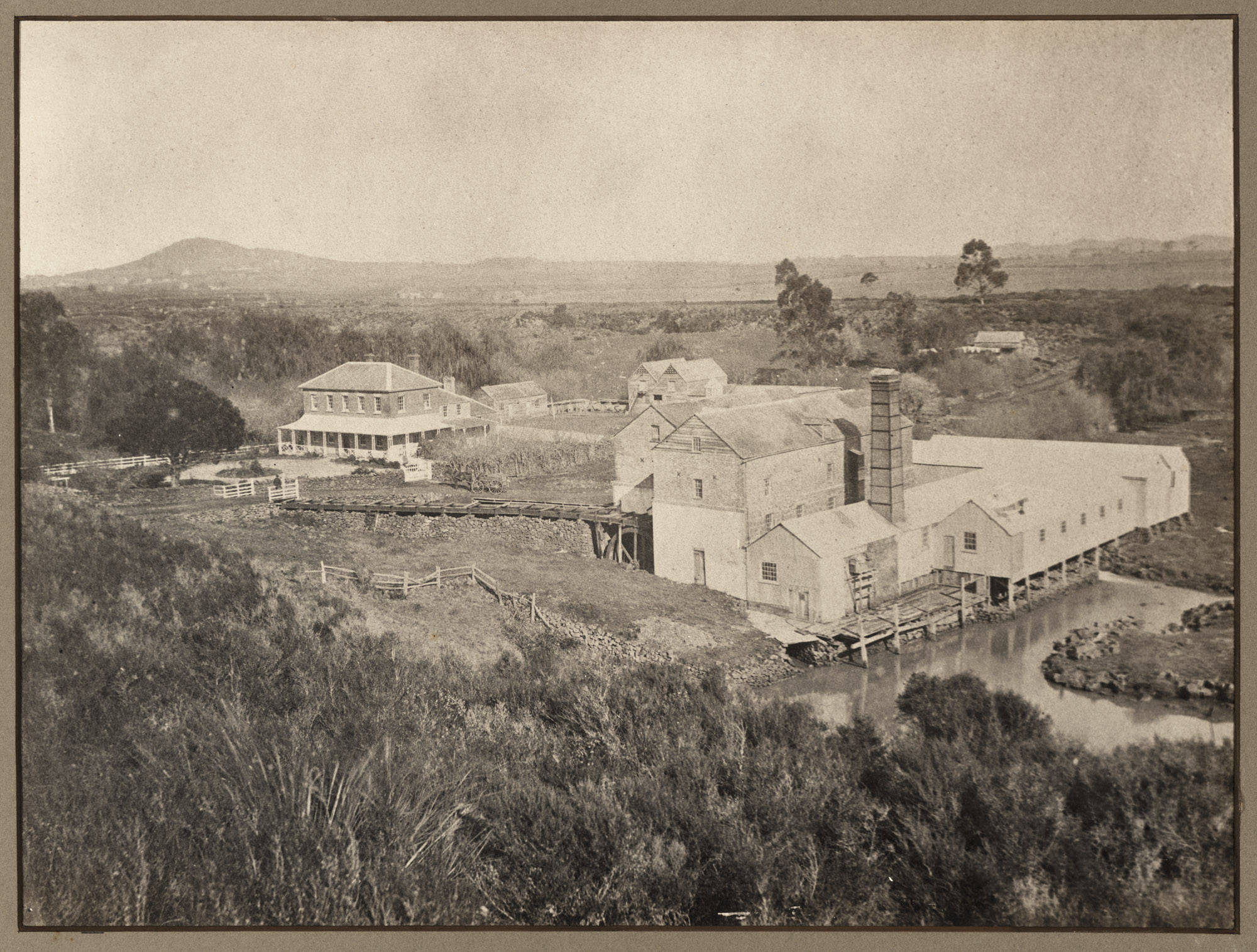
Low and Motions' Flour Mill on the banks of the Motions Creek, c. 1870s.

William Motion was a Scottish carpenter and settler who had sailed from Sydney to the Bay of Islands in early 1840 and witnessed the signing of the Treaty of Waitangi, before travelling south to Auckland. After arriving, he entered a partnership with businessman Joseph Low and started the firm Low and Motion, which in the early days of Auckland opened a flour mill which was located in what is now Carlaw Park in Parnell close to the east of the city close to the springs in Auckland Domain. However, due to growing water supply constraints from being so close to the city, they began looking for an alternative location outside city limits and subsequently purchased large sections of what become Western Springs.

They began growing wheat on the land, and in 1846, a flour mill was built on Waiateao located around the western boundary of the current zoo property, the waterway later known as Motions Creek which still runs through the zoo today. The creek also crucially allowed for water transport of wheat in from fields in Tamaki and flour out into the Waitematā Harbour, as overland routes out west were still crude. By the early 1870s, the mill had developed substantially into a three-floor building featuring two water wheels, two dams, and floodgates, with as many as 13 cutters waiting at the mouth to ferry goods in and out of the creek. A system of using horses to drag, and then later winch, flour uphill and into town was also developed. Motion had built a large two-storey, 12-room home for his family on the property, along with a dairy and stables.

==== Water spring use ====
The main source of the water that feeds the lake at Western Springs is rain falling on the slopes of the volcanoes Te Tātua a Riukiuta, Ōwairaka / Mount Albert and Maungawhau / Mount Eden. The water runs underground for several miles through the lava flows, and emerges from the ground at a constant rate that is well filtered by the miles of scoria rocks. As Auckland grew over the mid-1800s, city officials found that well water was no longer sufficient at supplying the burgeoning population. In the 1860s, a pipe from the Auckland Domain Springs was constructed, but a more permanent solution was required to service the growing demand. The closest alternative was Western Springs, currently owned by Motion.

Negotiations to buy the land from him initially failed in 1873, but in 1874, the council tasked Australian civil engineer Edward Orpen Moriarty with the task of working out how to supply Auckland with water from Western Springs. In 1875, the city bought William Motion's mill and 120 acres (486,000 m^{2}) of land, including the spring, at a lower price than initially offered in 1873. A contract signing ceremony was held, followed by an over 150-person luncheon at Motion's mill with "plenty of wine and viands". During this sale, a parcel of land was given by the council as an "endowment for the support and maintenance of Lunatic and other Asylums", land that Western Springs College now sits on.

In 1875, the swampy ground was made into a 15-acre (6ha) artificial lake 6 feet in depth and capable of holding 22 million gallons of water. Over the course of its construction, workers removed 20,000 cartloads of spoil from the site, and used 7,850 cubic yards of earth to construct the embankment which was 40 feet (12 m) wide at the base and 9 feet (2.7 m) wide at the crest. They also excavated the 25 feet (7.6 m) deep Engine Pond and dug a 60 feet (18 m) long tunnel between the lake and the Engine House.

A pumphouse, which began operation in 1877, was designed by City Engineer William Errington and built of brick. It was fitted with a steam engine, known as a beam engine, which is still in working order following its restoration. The engine pumped water up to the two new reservoirs; one on the corner of Ponsonby Road and Karangahape Road, and the other in the block bordered by Khyber Pass Road, Symonds Street, Mount Eden Road, and Burleigh Street from where the water was gravity fed down to the city. Later expansions included the construction of an additional bore near the pump, and pumping water from nearby Meola Creek.

However, there were issues with contamination as the area nearby behind Surrey Crescent was already being used as a night soil dump, with 50 tons of sewage being disposed there weekly. Residents raised concerns about runoff contaminating the market gardens that ran along the nearby hills and the springs downhill. In 1877, the same year the pumphouse started, the Council began construction on 6 communal slaughterhouses around West View Road, directly above the property, despite concerns about runoff into the water supply downhill. In 1885, two new slaughterhouse buildings were constructed and the remaining 6 leased out for profit. Another night soil dump opened above Motions Creek in 1892.

The cost of running and maintaining the pump was high however, and by the end of the 19th century Auckland's size required a much greater and more reliable source of freshwater. This coincided with public pressure to safeguard the remaining native forests of the Waitākere Ranges west of the city, and increasing concerns over contamination of the Western Springs supply. Auckland City purchased land and built large reservoirs in the Waitākeres, thus safeguarding both the water quality and the flora & fauna of the area. The height of the reservoirs above sea level meant pumping was kept to a minimum as the water could be gravity fed downwards to the city. Use of the pumphouse ceased in 1936 after the Waitākere Ranges dams were completed.

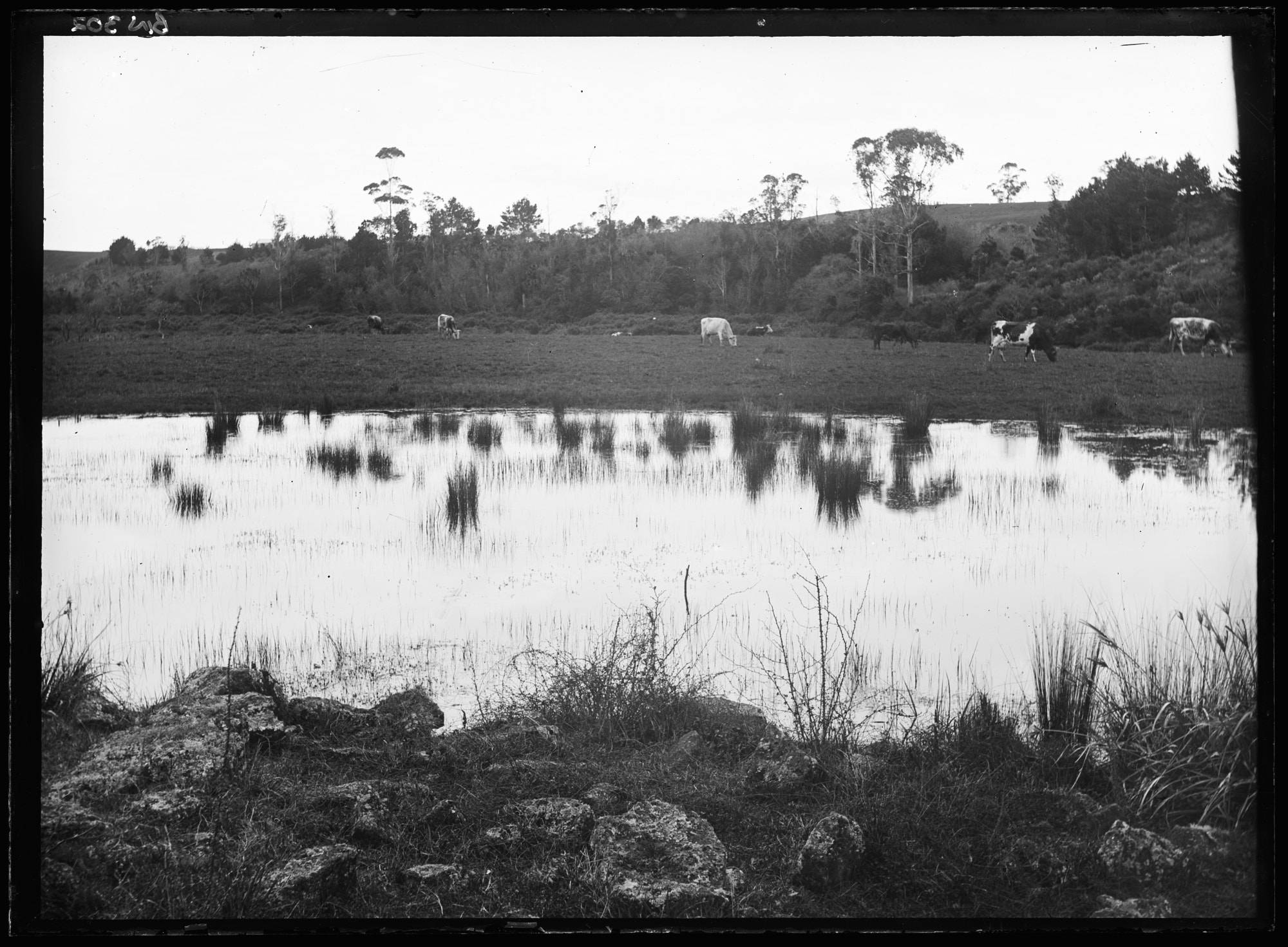
Cows grazing at a pond in Western Springs, early 1900s

=== Later development ===
From the early 1920s onwards various developments around Western Springs took place; The Auckland City Council Zoological Gardens were established to the north of the lake. To the west, around the corner of Motions Road and Great North Road, a camping ground was set up which was later converted into a transit camp for American servicemen during World War II. To the south of the lake, the Chamberlain Park Golf Club was established, and to the west, land was set aside for primary, intermediate and secondary schools to service the growing suburbs of Westmere and Point Chevalier.

The closure of the pumphouse left the inner Western Springs area with no specific use. Its often rough and uneven land was unsuitable for housing, as apart from the lake it contained large stretches of boggy ground. Unable to divest itself of the land, the Auckland City Council was at a loss what to do with it. Some light industry and market gardens were developed along Great North Road and Chinaman's Hill, named due to the pre-dominantly Chinese market gardeners, and an attempt was made to convert the boggy land around the lake into a park. However, over the next three decades much of the land deteriorated as it became overgrown and used for illegal rubbish dumping.

The council used some of the more usable land to construct council housing in the 1920s, and in the 1930s sold much of the land previously used for market gardens to the government for state housing. To the north of the zoo was an area of mangrove swamp where the Western Springs creek reached the sea near the Meola Reef lava outcrop. This was utilised as a landfill dump and hence reclaimed during the 1950s and 1960s. The reclaimed land was developed as playing fields and an additional area for the MOTAT Sir Keith Park Memorial Airfield, and serves as the site of the Westpoint Performing Arts Center. In the 2000s the landfill was found to be emitting methane gas and was subsequently capped with clay.

After the war, the population of the surrounding suburbs grew markedly and it became obvious that the untidy state of Western Springs was an embarrassment. As a wilderness of bogs full of rubbish, rats and mosquitoes, it was unattractive and a potential health hazard. In 1961 the Auckland City Council embarked on developing the park in earnest. The lake, which had become completely choked by introduced waterweed was reclaimed, and the overgrown landscape was carefully cleared of weeds and rubbish.

In 1953 a plan was put forward to use the area around the lake as an amusement park with a scenic railway, fairground and rollercoasters, but this was soon discovered to be beyond the financial capabilities of Auckland City Council. In 1964 the Museum of Transport and Technology (MOTAT) was established to the south-east of the lake, the old pumphouse forming its centrepiece.

By the 1980s major landscaping work had transformed the area from a former dumpsite into one of Auckland's most attractive parks. New plantings were introduced to complement the mature trees from the 19th century, and careful planting of the islands in the lake and its surrounding wetlands have made it a successful breeding ground for a large variety of native and exotic waterfowl. Artworks by several New Zealand sculptors were installed in the park during the 1980s and 1990s.

== Demographics ==
The statistical area of Westmere South-Western Springs, which includes part of Westmere, covers 2.02 km^{2} (0.78 sq mi) and had an estimated population of 2,990 as of June 2025, with a population density of 1,480 people per km^{2}.

Historical population
Year	Pop.	±% p.a.
2006	2,784	—
2013	3,039	+1.26%
2018	3,099	+0.39%
2023	2,859	−1.60%

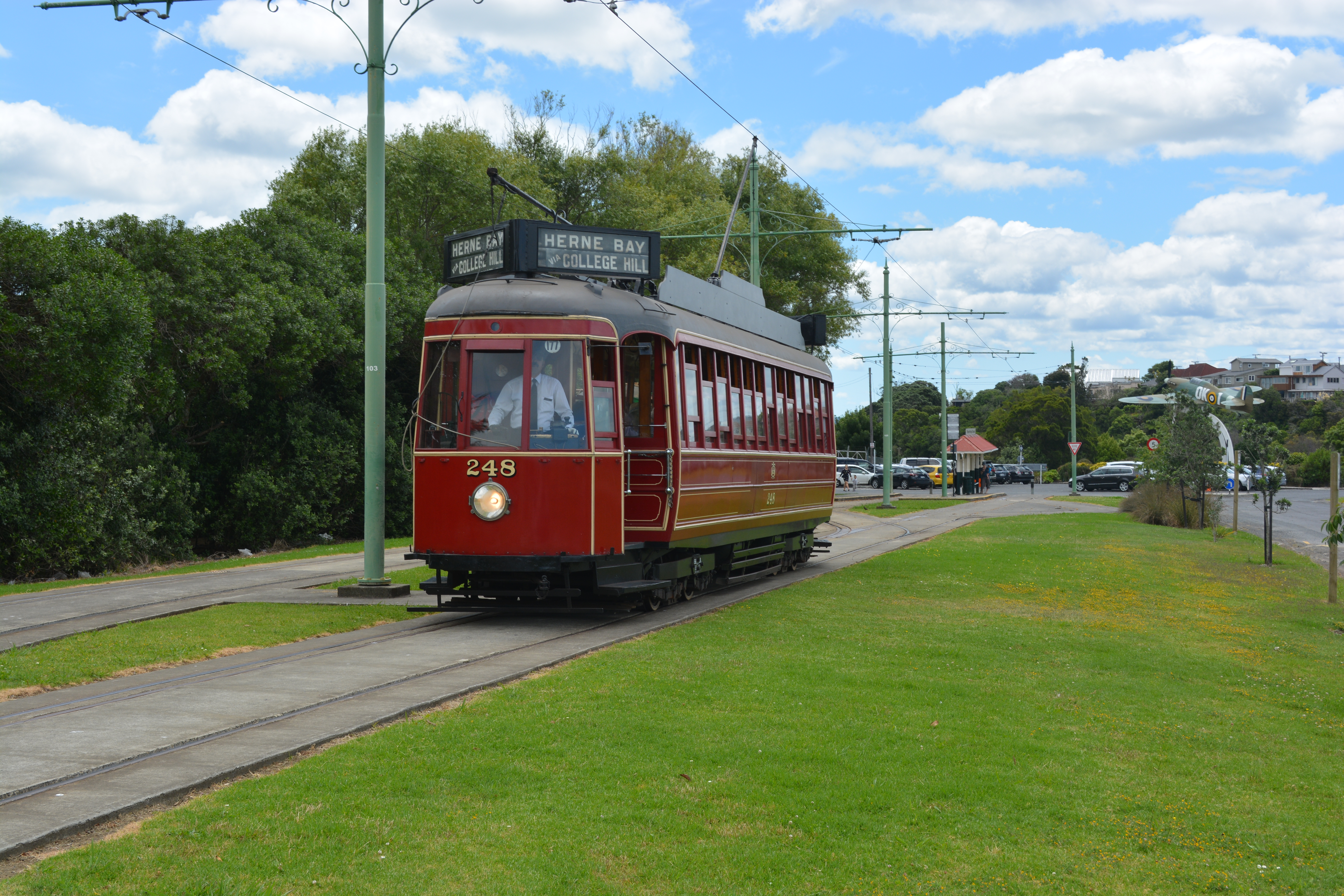
The tram running between MOTAT's two sites

Westmere South-Western Springs had a population of 2,859 in the 2023 New Zealand census, a decrease of 240 people (−7.7%) since the 2018 census, and a decrease of 180 people (−5.9%) since the 2013 census. There were 1,356 males, 1,482 females and 18 people of other genders in 1,062 dwellings. 6.7% of people identified as LGBTIQ+. The median age was 39.6 years (compared with 38.1 years nationally). There were 492 people (17.2%) aged under 15 years, 609 (21.3%) aged 15 to 29, 1,455 (50.9%) aged 30 to 64, and 303 (10.6%) aged 65 or older.

People could identify as more than one ethnicity. The results were 84.3% European (Pākehā); 11.4% Māori; 8.3% Pasifika; 7.8% Asian; 2.5% Middle Eastern, Latin American and African New Zealanders (MELAA); and 2.4% other, which includes people giving their ethnicity as "New Zealander". English was spoken by 97.3%, Māori language by 2.9%, Samoan by 1.5%, and other languages by 13.6%. No language could be spoken by 1.8% (e.g. too young to talk). New Zealand Sign Language was known by 0.2%. The percentage of people born overseas was 24.0, compared with 28.8% nationally.

Religious affiliations were 23.3% Christian, 1.2% Hindu, 1.2% Islam, 0.2% Māori religious beliefs, 0.7% Buddhist, 0.4% New Age, 0.7% Jewish, and 1.0% other religions. People who answered that they had no religion were 66.1%, and 5.4% of people did not answer the census question.

Of those at least 15 years old, 1,206 (51.0%) people had a bachelor's or higher degree, 882 (37.3%) had a post-high school certificate or diploma, and 279 (11.8%) people exclusively held high school qualifications. The median income was $61,300, compared with $41,500 nationally. 714 people (30.2%) earned over $100,000 compared to 12.1% nationally. The employment status of those at least 15 was that 1,371 (57.9%) people were employed full-time, 366 (15.5%) were part-time, and 69 (2.9%) were unemployed.

== Education ==
Western Springs College is a coeducational high school (years 9–13) with a roll of 1,758 as of July 2026.
