= Upper Hutt Posse =

New Zealand hip hop group

- Origin: Wellington, New Zealand
- Genres: Reggae, Rap Fusion
- Years active: 1985–present
- Labels: Jayrem Records; Southside Records; Tangata Records; Universal Music; Kia Kaha Productions
- Members: Te Kupu aka D Word; M.C. Wiya; Aaron Thompson; Jeff Henderson; Earl Lee Dee; Des Mallon; Ātaahua Hapeta-Taereau
- Past members: MC Beware; DLT; Teremoana; Maaka Phat; Nathan Warren; Acid Dread; Enoka Love; Kiki Marama; Voodoo Chile; Taki Matete; Lincoln Hapeta-Timoteo; Rhys B; John Henare aka Dready
- Website: Official site

Upper Hutt Posse (UHP) are a New Zealand hip hop group formed in Upper Hutt, Wellington, in 1985. Upper Hutt Posse are one of the earliest New Zealand hip hop groups, known for their fusion of rap and reggae in both English and Māori. Prominent members include DLT, Dean "Te Kupu" Hapeta and Teremoana Rapley.

After signing to Jayrem Records, Upper Hutt Posse released their first single, 'E Tū', in 1988, which paid homage to Te Rauparaha and the Ngāti Toa heritage of the Hutt Valley. Their debut album Against The Flow was released the next year, which brought them international recognition. The group then became closely associated with Moana and The Moahunters, of whom their key member Teremoana was also part of. The group's single 'Ragga Girl' appeared on the soundtrack the film Once Were Warriors in 1994. A new lineup of live musicians produced the 1995 album Movement in Demand, mixing their signature Hiphop style with their reggae roots. Subsequent albums increasingly featured the Māori language, such as Mā Te Wā in 2000 and Te Reo Māori Remixes in 2002, for which they won a Tui Award. In 2007 another 'live' lineup was formed including Maaka McGregor (drums) who had performed live with the group at various gigs since 1995. In November 2018, Upper Hutt Posse were inducted into the New Zealand Music Hall of Fame - Te Whare Taonga Puoro o Aotearoa.

== History ==
UHP formed as a four-piece reggae band in 1985. Since their inception, Dean Hapeta (also known as D Word or Te Kupu) and the Posse have been fighting racial injustice through their music. In 1988 they released the first rap record and music-video in New Zealand, E Tū, through Jayrem Records. The song combined African American revolutionary rhetoric with an explicitly Māori frame of reference. It pays homage to Māori warrior chiefs resistant of British colonialism, Hōne Heke, Te Kooti, and Te Rauparaha.

Releasing their debut album, Against The Flow in 1989 through Southside Records, the group performed nationally and the following year in Sydney and then Detroit. Against The Flow consists of sequenced/programmed rap and reggae songs and a political slow jam titled Stormy Weather, the unique lineup of two rappers, a reggae toaster, a female singer, a male singer, and a DJ allowed main songwriter D Word to compose without having to use 'featured' vocalists outside the group. In 1990, the group toured marae (Māori community centres), and supported Public Enemy when they visited New Zealand, and performed with the ragga artist Macca B and the Zimbabwean group the Bhundu Boys in Australia. October 1992 saw the completion of a music-documentary, Solidarity, showing UHPosse's visit to the U.S., co-directed by Dean Hapeta and Rongotai Lomas, the music-documentary was aired on TV ONE's Marae. With the departure of Darryl Thompson around this time, and then Teremoana Rapley 1993, who became a member of Moana and the Moahunters, and a presenter on television series Mai Time, being joined later by MC Beware who had left the group in late 1989. D Word formed Kia Kaha Productions Ltd and continues up to the present day as the leader of UHP through various lineup changes. Upon the release of the movie Once Were Warriors, the group's single Ragga Girl appeared on the soundtrack, with MC Wiya and D Word making cameo appearances. In 1993 UHP performed at the inaugural Polynesian Music Festival held in Rarotonga.

A new lineup in 1994 of live musicians produced the 1995 album Movement in Demand, mixing their signature Hiphop style with their reggae roots, and adding the distinctive raggamuffin rap of Wiya. In 2000 album Mā Te Wā saw the re-introduction of founding member Blue Dread, and also Katarina Kawana who had 'jammed' with the group in their formative years in the mid 1980s. Mā Te Wā is a digital reggae album completely in the Māori language. In 2002 UHP released Te Reo Māori Remixes, a 10-track album of earlier favourites remixed and featuring only Māori-language lyrics. This album received a Tui Award at the 2003 NZ Music Awards for 'Best Mana Māori Album'. In 2005, the group released a double album titled Legacy which includes two tracks performed by Te Kupu's daughter Ātaahua, notably a Māori-language version of The Greatest Love of All. Disc One, Ngāti is predominantly in English language, while Disc Two, Huia, is all in Māori.

In 2007 another 'live' lineup was formed including Maaka McGregor (drums) who had performed live with the group at various gigs since 1995, Dez Mallon (guitar) and Nathan Warren (bass), Te Kupu and MC Wiya made up the five core members at that time which also included additional musicians. In July 2008 the first recording session for a new 'live band' studio album commenced at Trident Studio and in September 2008 Ka Whawhai Tonu Mātou from this first recording session was released digitally (alongside a music-video) as a special song denoting 20 years since the release of debut recording E Tū. While production continued for the live band album through 2009, production began also on a bilingual (Māori and English language) electronica album titled Tohe released in July 2010. Then in October 2011 the live band album Declaration of Resistance was released, featuring images on its front cover from Te Kupu's six-part rap documentary Ngātahi – Know The Links. Supported by the most extensive touring by the band to date, with Te Kupu fronting the band on electric guitar and MC Wiya on bass (a significant revamp), performing with a fluid lineup of live musicians.

In November 2018 Upper Hutt Posse were inducted into the New Zealand Music Hall of Fame | Te Whare Taonga Puoro o Aotearoa. Te Kupu selected eighteen past and present band members, and additional musicians whose contributions to the group warranted their being recognised: Dean Hapeta, Matthew Hapeta, Aaron Thompson, Darryl Thomson, Bennet Pomana, Teremoana Rapley, Steve Rameka, George Hubbard, Earl Robertson, Kiki Marama, Taki Matete, Katarina Kawana, Ātaahua Hapeta-Taereau, Maaka McGregor, Emma Paki, Des Mallon, Jeff Henderson, Kevin Rangihuna.

In January 2019 the first recording session for the next UHP album is held with Earl Robertson drumming to music sequenced by Te Kupu, followed by further sessions with drummers Ruben Das Gonzales, and then Riki Gooch, as well as recording sessions held at Matakahi Studio with various live musicians pulled in by Te Kupu, who himself plays bass, guitars, piano, synthesizer, alto saxophone and percussion, creating what he says is probably "the most musically-realised UHP album yet." 2021 will see Say Do Don't Do People the first single released prior to the album.

== Upper Hutt Posse lineups ==
| Member + Guest Musicians | Founding members (1985) | Against The Flow (1989) | Movement in Demand (1995) | Mā Te Wā (2000) | Te Reo Māori Remixes (2002) | Legacy (2005) | Tohe (2010) | Declaration of Resistance (2011) |
|---|---|---|---|---|---|---|---|---|
| Dean Hapeta / D Word / Te Kupu | | | | | | | | |
| Matthew Hapeta / M.C. Wiya | | | | | | | | |
| Aaron Thompson | | | | | | | | |
| Darryl Thomson / DLT | | | | | | | | |
| Bennett Pomana | | | | | | | | |
| Teremoana Rapley | | | | | | | | |
| Steve Rameka | | | | | | | | |
| Kiki Marama | | | | | | | | |
| Taki Matete | | | | | | | | |
| Earl Robertson | | | | | | | | |
| Rhys Bell | | | | | | | | |
| Emma Paki | | | | | | | | |
| Katarina Kawana | | | | | | | | |
| Ataahua Hapeta-Taereau | | | | | | | | |
| Des Mallon | | | | | | | | |
| Jeff Henderson | | | | | | | | |
| Maaka McGregor | | | | | | | | |
| Kevin Rangihuna | | | | | | | | |
| Crete Haami | | | | | | | | |
| Nathan Warren | | | | | | | | |
| Jeremy Coubrough | | | | | | | | |
| Nigel Paterson | | | | | | | | |

== Discography ==
=== Albums ===
| Year | Title | Details | Peak chart positions |
| Year | Title | Details | NZ |
|---|---|---|---|
| 1989 | Against the Flow | Label: Southside Records; Catalogue: L 30177 | — |
| 1995 | Movement in Demand | Label: Kia Kaha Productions / Tangata / BMG; Released: 2 June 1995 | — |
| 2000 | Mā Te Wā | Label: Kia Kaha Productions / Universal; Released: 2 June 2000 | — |
| 2002 | Te Reo Māori Remixes | Label: Kia Kaha Productions / Jayrem; Released: 31 May 2002 | — |
| 2004 | Dedicated '88-'91 | Label: Kia Kaha Productions / Jayrem; Released: 3 May 2004 | — |
| 2005 | Legacy | Label: Kia Kaha Productions / Jayrem; Released: 13 November 2005 | — |
| 2010 | Tohe | Label: Kia Kaha Productions / Rhythmethod; Released: 11 July 2010 | — |
| 2011 | Declaration of Resistance | Label: Kia Kaha Productions / Rhythmethod; Released: 22 October 2011 | — |
"—" denotes a recording that did not chart or was not released in that territory.

=== Singles ===
| Year | Title | Peak chart positions | Album |
| Year | Title | NZ | Album |
|---|---|---|---|
| 1988 | "E Tu" | — | Non-album single |
| 1989 | "Do It Like This" | 33 | Against The Flow |
| 1990 | "Against the Flow / That's The Beat (remixes)" | 44 | Non-album single |
| 1991 | "Stormy Weather (remix)" | — | Non-album single |
| 1992 | "Ragga Girl" | 48 | Non-album single |
| 1995 | "Can't Get Away" | — | Movement in Demand |
| 1995 | "As the Blind See" | — | Movement in Demand |
| 2005 | "Overcome" | — | Legacy |
| 2008 | "Ka Whawhai Tonu Mātou" | — | Declaration of Resistance |
"—" denotes a recording that did not chart or was not released in that territory.

== Awards ==
=== Aotearoa Music Awards ===
The Aotearoa Music Awards (previously known as New Zealand Music Awards (NZMA)) are an annual awards night celebrating excellence in New Zealand music and have been presented annually since 1965.

| Year | Nominee / work | Award | Result | Ref. |
|---|---|---|---|---|
| 1989 | Upper Hutt Posse | Most Promising Group | Nominated | |
| 2003 | Upper Hutt Posse (Te Reo Maori Remixes) | Mana Māori | Won | |
| 2012 | Declaration of Resistance | Mana Māori | Nominated | |
| 2018 | Upper Hutt Posse | New Zealand Music Hall of Fame | Inductee | |

=== Taite Music Prize ===
| Year | Nominee / work | Award | Result | Ref. |
|---|---|---|---|---|
| 2016 | E Tu | IMNZ Classic Record | Won | |
