= Traction (album) =

Studio album by Supergroove
- Released: 1994
- Genres: Rap rock; funk rock
- Length: 48:12
- Label: RCA

Supergroove chronology
Traction (1994)	Tractor (1995)

Singles from Traction
- 1. "You Gotta Know" Released: 1993; 2. "Scorpio Girls" Released: 1993; 3. "Can't Get Enough" Released: 1994; 4. "Sitting Inside My Head" Released: 1994

Traction is the debut studio album by New Zealand rock band Supergroove. It was released in 1994 by RCA Records, debuting at number one on the New Zealand albums chart and quickly reached platinum status there.^{[2]} Before the band could record their second album, lead vocalist Che Fu was fired from the band. Supergroove would release their second and final studio album Backspacer without Fu. To date, the album has been certified five times platinum.^{[3]}

== Awards ==
Traction won the Album of the Year award at the 1995 New Zealand Music Awards.

== Track listing ==
All tracks written by Joe (Fisher) Lonie and Karl Steven except "You Gotta Know (Remix)" by Lonie, Steven, and Che Fu.

Traction track listing
No.	Title	Length
1.	"Scorpio Girls"	4:06
2.	"Your White Shirt"	3:46
3.	"You Gotta Know (Remix)"	3:36
4.	"Bugs & Critters"	5:20
5.	"Next Time"	3:39
6.	"Don't Look Down"	4:57
7.	"Sitting Inside My Head"	3:29
8.	"Can't Get Enough"	3:19
9.	"For Whatever Reason"	5:04
10.	"You Freak Me"	4:19
11.	"Only the Rain"	6:34
Total length:		48:12

== Charts ==
Chart performance for Traction
Chart (1994)	Peak position
Australian Albums (ARIA)	46
New Zealand Albums (RMNZ)	1
