= Navigator (Che Fu album) =

Studio album by Che Fu
- Released: November 5, 2001
- Label: Sony Music

Che Fu chronology
2b S.Pacific (1998)	Navigator (2001)	Beneath the Radar (2005)

Singles from Navigator
- 1. "Fade Away" Released: 2001; 2. "Random" Released: 2001; 3. "Misty Frequencies" Released: 2002

Navigator is an album released in 2001 by New Zealand hip-hop artist, Che Fu.

== Track listing ==
No.	Title	Writer(s)	Producer(s)	Length
1.	"Misty Frequencies"	Che Ness; Godfrey De Grut	Ness	3:13
2.	"Catch One"	Ness	Ness	3:27
3.	"Random"	Ness	Ness	3:37
4.	"Share the Info"	Ness; B. Taylor; J. Schuster; Peter Wadams	Ness; Wadams	4:07
5.	"The Abyss"	Ness; Wadams	Ness; Wadams	4:02
6.	"Interlude 1"		Ness	0:19
7.	"Top Floor"	Ness	Ness	3:34
8.	"Hold Tight"	Ness	Ness	4:43
9.	"He Kotahi (As One)"	Ness; J. Levi	Ness	3:40
10.	"Full Immersion"	Ness	Ness	1:09
11.	"Roots Man"	Ness; H. Ramapia; Schuster	Ness	3:19
12.	"The Mish (2)"	Ness; Taylor; Ramapia; Schuster; Wadams	Ness; Wadams	4:43
13.	"Fade Away"	Ness	Ness	4:06
14.	"Interlude 2"		Ness	0:24
15.	"The Natural"	Ness; Wadams	Ness; Wadams	3:51
Total length:				48:19

Source: Spotify.

== Chart performance ==
Chart (2001)	Peak position
New Zealand Albums (RMNZ)	1

== Reception ==
Kelvin Hayes of AllMusic said the variation of genres in Navigator resulted in Che Fu's voice being compared to "a narrative too seldom heard".

== Certifications ==
Region	Certification	Certified units/sales
New Zealand (RMNZ)	2× Platinum	30,000^{^}
^{^} Shipments figures based on certification alone.
