= Western Springs College =

School in New Zealand

Location
- 100 Motions Road; Western Springs; Auckland 1022; New Zealand; 36°51′45″S 174°43′2″E

Information
- Type: State Co-educational secondary school(Year 9–13)
- Motto: Whāia te mātauranga.
- Established: circa 1960; 66 years ago
- Ministry of Education Institution no.: 48
- Principal: Ivan Davis (WSC); Chris Selwyn (NPoW)
- Enrolment: 1,758 (July 2026)
- Socio-economic decile: 8P
- Website: westernsprings.school.nz waiorea.school.nz

Western Springs College is a state co-educational secondary school located in Western Springs, an inner suburb of Auckland, New Zealand. Western Springs College and Ngā Puna o Waiōrea teach collaboratively on one campus. The school educates approximately 1,758 students, from Years 9 to 13 (ages 13 to 18). The school was originally part of Seddon Memorial Technical College, but was moved to the current Western Springs site in 1964.

== History ==
The school was originally called Seddon Memorial Technical College even after being resited to Motions Rd till 1968 when renamed Seddon High School.

== Facilities ==
The Auckland Performing Arts Centre (TAPAC) is located adjacent to the school grounds.

== Achievements ==
In 2015, Mercy Williams of Western Springs College had won $500 at the Play It Strange Wero Songwriting Competition for her song, Embrace the Day.

In 2016, the school was the top-ranked school for both boys and girls, by the Metro Magazine.

== Notable alumni ==
- Che Fu
- Joel Little
- Nesian Mystik
- Courtney Sina Meredith
- Viliami Ofahengaue: ("Willie O") Australia national rugby union team, 1991 Rugby World Cup winner
- Supergroove
