= Dick Frizzell =

New Zealand artist (born 1943)

Dick Frizzell MNZM
- Born: Richard John Frizzell; 1943 (age 82–83)
- Education: Ilam School of Fine Arts
- Style: Pop
- Relatives: Otis Frizzell (son)

Richard John Frizzell MNZM (born 1943) is a New Zealand artist known for his pop art paintings and prints. His work often features Kiwiana iconography combined with motifs from Māori art traditions, such as the tiki and tā moko. He is based in Auckland.

== Career ==
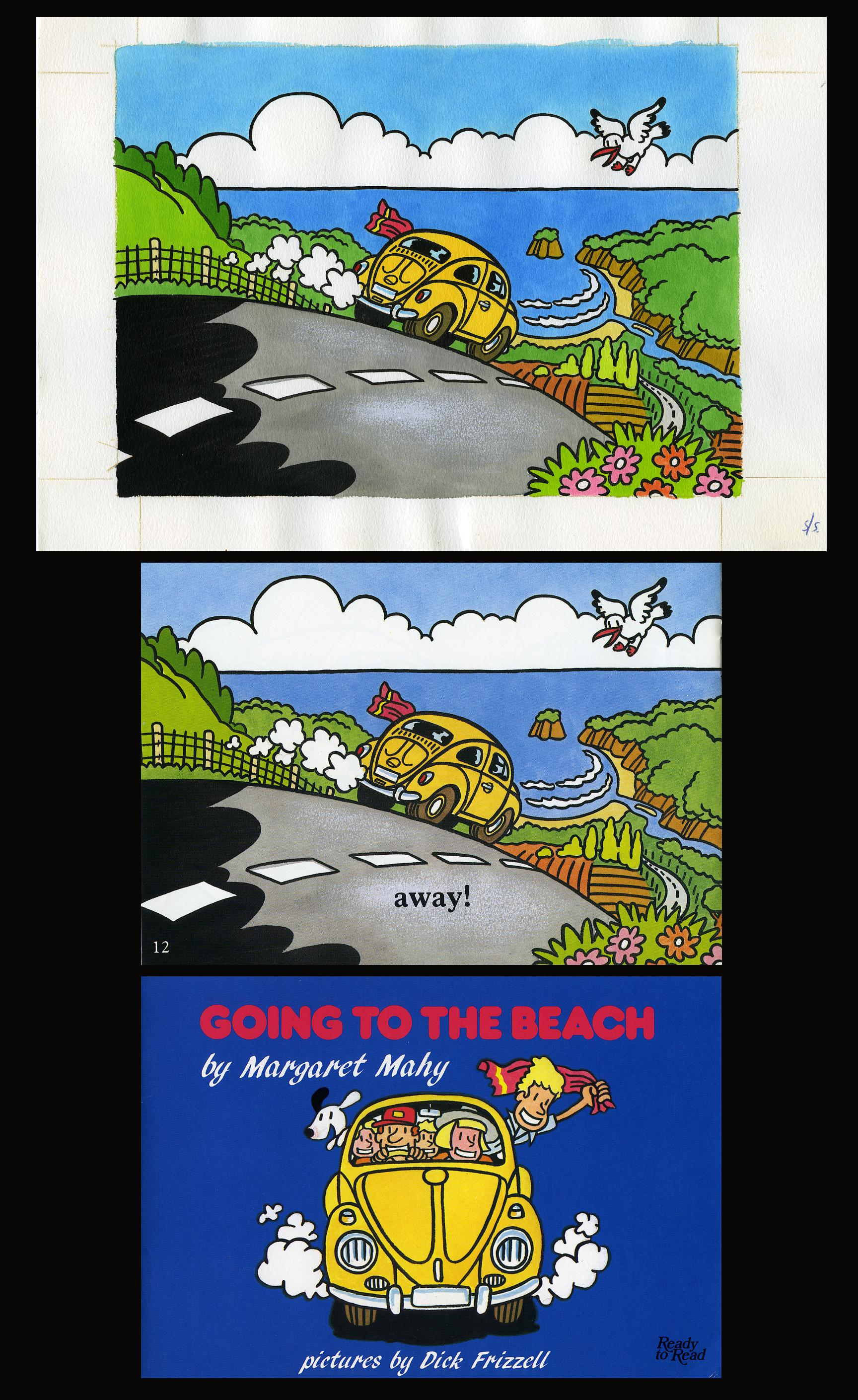
Artwork by Dick Frizzell

Frizzell's exhibition Tiki in November 1992 at Auckland's Gow Langsford Gallery aroused controversy for his series of paintings reworking the tiki image to resemble subjects as varied as Casper the Friendly Ghost and a Picasso abstract.

Frizzell has contributed designs to Esther Diamond linen company, has released several varieties of "Frizzell Wines," and designed the cover and several illustrations for The Great New Zealand Songbook (2009).

Frizzell wrote Dick Frizzell: The Painter (Random House NZ, 2009), with a foreword by art writer Hamish Keith. In 2012, he completed a series of paintings of poems by Sam Hunt. At the opening of the exhibition of those paintings on 7 February 2012, Frizzell said that he and Hunt had, in their respective paintings and poems, committed the ultimate "sin", the "sin of being understood".

In the 2004 Queen's Birthday Honours, Frizzell was appointed a Member of the New Zealand Order of Merit, for services to the arts.

=== Photorealistic art ===
Though he is best known for his cartoon-derived work, Frizzell is also known as a painter of photorealistic landscapes and still life. His landscapes, often views of rural New Zealand as seen from narrow country roads, have been the subject of several exhibitions, among them Out of Alex, at Dunedin's Milford Gallery in 2019.

== Personal life ==
Frizzell is a brother of politician Steve Chadwick. Frizzell has three children, including Josh Frizzell, a television and advertising director, and Otis Frizzell, an artist and half of hiphop music duo Slave & Otis.
