= What Can We Say? =

Studio album by MC OJ and Rhythm Slave
- Released: 1991
- Genre: Hip hop
- Length: 42:35
- Label: Southside Records
- Producer: Rhythm & Business Productions, Strawpeople

Singles from What Can We Say?
- 1. "That's The Way (Positivity)" Released: 1990; 2. "Body Rhymes (Protect Yourself)" Released: 1991; 3. "Money Worries" Released: 1991; 4. "Joined at the Hip Hop" Released: 1992

What Can We Say? is the 1991 debut album of New Zealand hip hop duo MC OJ and Rhythm Slave. It includes the singles "That's The Way (Positivity)" and "Money Worries", which charted at #12 and #36 respectively.

The album was written and produced in collaboration with George Hubbard and Daniel Barnes (Rhythm and Business) and Paul Casserly and Mark Tierney (Strawpeople).

== Track listing ==
All lyrics are written by M Williams, O Frizzell

No.	Title	Music	Featured vocals	Length
1.	"Joined At The Hip-Hop"	M Tierney, P Casserly	Bobbylon	4:18
2.	"Positivity"	D Barnes, G Hubbard, H Casey, R Finch		4:12
3.	"Body Rhymes (Protect Yourself)"	G Hubbard, M Tierney	Teremoana Rapley	2:30
4.	"Sway Like This"		Bobbylon	6:01
5.	"Rhythm Business"	D Barnes, G Hubbard		4:58
6.	"Money Worries"	M Tierney, P Casserly	Mikey Havoc	3:33
7.	"10.55"	M Tierney, P Casserly		3:28
8.	"Doc Martens"			3:43
9.	"Marijuana"	D Barnes, G Hubbard		3:59
10.	"The One About Girls"	D Barnes, G Hubbard		5:53
