= Aotearoa hip-hop summit =

The first hip hop summit in NZ was organised by the late Philip Fuemana in 1996 & 1997 that honors the hip hop scene in New Zealand. In August 2000, a new group of hiphoppers started it back up under Aotearoa hip hop summit which took place at the Lumiere Theatre in Christchurch. The second summit, in September 2001, took place in Auckland.

== Event ==
The "godfather of New Zealand hip hop" Phil Fuemana organized the first summit in 1996 and 1997. Then in 2000 Alistair Tate describes the event as "three days and nights of uninterrupted, pure hip hop action." In the first summit, only New Zealand artists performed. To encourage collaboration, international artists were included in the second summit. One component of the event is dancing competitions between b-boys and b-girls. Many participants boast of the heavy involvement of females, which they believe distinguishes the Aotearoan hip hop community from their counterparts in countries such as the United States. The event is now sponsored by Boost Mobile and known as the Boost Mobile Aotearoa Hip Hop Summit.
