= Polynesian Panthers =

1970s Pasifika civil rights group based in Auckland

- Named after: Black Panther Party
- Formation: 16 June 1971
- Dissolved: 1983
- Purpose: Social justice activism that highlighted and targeted racial inequalities carried out against Māori and Pacific Islanders in Auckland, New Zealand
- Headquarters: Auckland, New Zealand
- Location: New Zealand
- Members: 500
- Founder: Will 'Ilolahia

The Polynesian Panther Party (PPP) was a social justice movement formed to target racial inequalities carried out against indigenous Māori and Pacific Islanders in Auckland, New Zealand. Founded by a group of young Polynesians on 16 June 1971, the Panthers worked to aid in community betterment through activism and protest. Besides peaceful protests, they helped provide education, legal aid, and other social resources, such as ESOL classes and youth community programs. The group was explicitly influenced by the American Black Panther Party, particularly Huey Newton’s policy of Black unity through his global call-to-action, as well as his ideology of intercommunalism. The movement galvanised widespread support during the Dawn Raids of the 1970s, and greatly helped contribute to the modern pan-Polynesian ethnic identity in New Zealand called Pasifika.

The Polynesian Panthers operated to bring awareness and combat exploitative social relations of Pasifika people, including redlining, racial profiling, disproportionate incarceration, and segregation in sport. The PPP effectively ceased for many years after founding member and main organiser, Will 'Ilolahia, fled the country in 1983 after being threatened by police, following his acquittal for helping organise protests of the 1981 Springbok Tour. The name was adopted by an activist group in the 2010s, who continued to fight for human rights in New Zealand, and have support from original PPP members.

== Foundation ==
The Polynesian Panther Movement was founded in inner-city Auckland on 16 June 1971 by six young Pacific Islanders: Fred Schmidt, Nooroa Teavae, Paul Dapp, Vaughan Sanft, Eddie Williams and Will 'Ilolahia. They extended their branch to men and women in the community interested in advocating for Pasifika rights. The Panthers' lead function was to raise consciousness and ensure community wellbeing in response to racial discrimination, prejudice and social inequality faced by indigenous Māori citizens and Pacific Islanders. Amidst racial tension and backlash, the Party sought to protect the Polynesian community from aggressive policies and policing.

Soon after establishing headquarters in Ponsonby, their impacts extended to create a fusion of ex-gang members, university students, revolutionaries & radicals with most aged in their 20s. At the time many Pacific Island youth were supporters of Māori political initiatives such as the Bastion Point occupation and Waitangi Day protests, gaining skills in political lobbying and processes which they used to raise the profile of Pacific people in New Zealand. Within a few years the movement had expanded nationally with over 500 members and supporters, and 13 chapters including South Auckland, Christchurch and Dunedin, as well as several chapters in prisons.

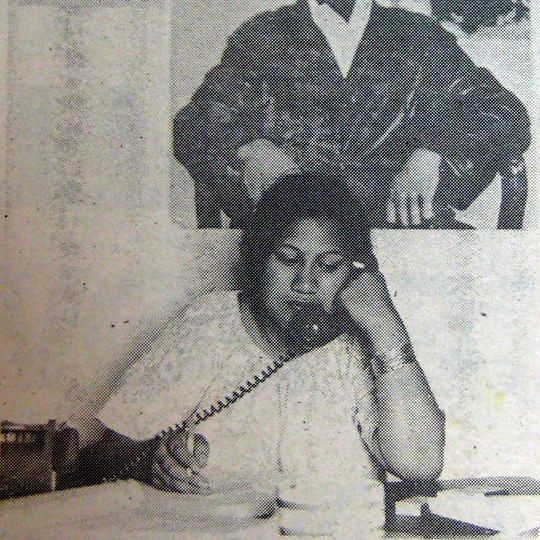
"Ama Ness, a PPP community worker, aids some people over the telephone by rapping about their problems"

== Community outreach ==
The Polynesian Panthers began to organize activities, workshops and group initiatives in place of lacking social resources available to Polynesians at the time. Among these were homework centres and tutoring for Pacific children, running programs educating Māori and Pacific Islanders on their rights as New Zealand citizens, free meal programs and food banks for roughly 600 families. Youth programs by the PPP were also intended to inspire community initiative and discourage gang integration.

Through their dedication to Polynesian legal aid, the Panthers were advocating for those forcibly evicted in poor communities by private security firms and those who became unemployed, lost their visas due to their tenant conflicts or were under threat of deportation under new policy. Because of the working-class background of its members the movement heavily concerned itself with issues relating to unequal pay and unsatisfactory working and living conditions. The Panthers also provided many in the community with ‘people’s loans’ in times of need. With the help of David Lange, who served as their legal advisor from 1971 to 1976 before becoming the country's Prime Minister, they were able to release their Legal Aid book to ensure that Polynesian migrants and citizens were best equipped to defend themselves against the system.

As part of the efforts to restore prosperity to Pasifika communities, the Polynesian Panthers organized a prison-visit program, mimicking that of the Black Panther Party. This program gave families access to bus transport, and recognized the need for socialization for those behind bars. The Panthers frequently spoke with Polynesians who did not have other visitors organized sporting events and debate teams for inmates, and often offered a halfway-house accommodation for those released from prison.

According to Will 'Ilolahia, the movement's social outreach, especially involving youth, is what led to their increase in female members. By advocating for equity of the sexes, the Panthers were able to promote egalitarianism through multiple sectors for the Polynesian community as a whole. Scholars note that the women in the group challenged systemic racism and sexism by taking on very functional roles in working for the cause that were generally different from female roles in Polynesian society. Panther member, Miriama Rauhihi Ness (Ama Ness), was hired as a full-time social-worker after she led a Pasifika women's strike for pay and work conditions; she also began organizing gender equality workshops for other Panthers and men in the community to target cultural bias and violence against women.

== Activism ==
=== Dawn Raids ===
New Zealand's economy had declined in the late 1960s due to their reliance on international developments, including wool prices, dairy products and oil. Many Pacific Islanders were encouraged to migrate in-land and fill the labour shortage for low-experience jobs. Norman Kirk assembled a police task force in 1973 to deal with overstayers in Auckland, which lead to a number of "Dawn Raids" and the racial profiling of Pacific Islanders. The Polynesian Panthers greatly increased in profile by continued protesting and advocacy for Polynesian rights during Robert Muldoon's immigration scare campaign in 1975, and the intensified promotion of police raids under his administration. The raids involved police storming the homes of those suspected of overstaying temporary working visas, typically at dawn. Though the majority of people overstaying such visas were from the UK, Australia and South Africa, the dawn raids disproportionately targeted over-stayers of Pacific Islander heritage. "A study carried out in 1985–86 was revealing: it showed that whereas Pacific Island people comprised only a third of overstayers, they made up 86% of all prosecutions for overstaying."(Beaglehole, 2015) In protest, Polynesian Panther members would organise "counter raids" on the homes of several prominent cabinet members, including Bill Birch and Frank Gill, who were in favour of the policy, by surrounding them with light and chanting with megaphones. The government's dawn raids ended less than three weeks after the Panthers began their protest. During this time, the PPP continued to provide legal aid to detainees.

"If you were brown, you were stopped by the police. If you were brown and had no ID, you went straight to the cell ... I [told a police officer] 'Look, I was born in New Zealand, I don't usually carry my passport around in my back pocket because I'm not travelling anywhere'."

— Reverend Wayne Toleafoa, former Information Minister for the Panthers

=== Police Investigation Group ===
In response to the New Zealand police task-force and the Muldoon government's continuation of aggressive policies against Pasifikas, the Panthers initiated their own detail known as the Police Investigation Group Patrol, or PIG Patrol, to monitor and protect the community. Policies of the police at the time included profiling and frequently approaching Pacific Islanders and insisting they provide their passport. Anyone who did not have their passport on their person could be detained immediately and taken to prison. Convoys of police vehicles would routinely approach bars frequented by Pacific Islanders, often looking to provoke any reaction that could result in an arrest. In response, the PIG Patrol monitored police convoys by listening to police frequencies, phoning in their locations, following police vans, warning bar attendees of a potential visit and providing Legal Aid pamphlets.

=== Rugby ===
Despite the formations of anti-racist groups (Halt All Racist Tours, 1969), much of the Rugby Union seemed to turn a blind-eye to the racial discrimination within the league. As one of the most renowned activist events in rugby, the Panthers played a large role in protesting racial selection in the sport by joining rallies against the 1981 Springbok Tour. Because of South African apartheid, New Zealand sports teams were urged to exclude Māori players and select rosters according to racial segregation, said to be in the best interest and safety of the players. In 1970, All Blacks rugby toured its Māori and Islander players under the privileged status of 'honorary whites', although many were not satisfied with this gesture of tolerance.

This was the last major activism undertaken by the Panthers, and was also the most physically involved protest, with police counter-charge and game spectator violence. Panther Tigilau Ness was imprisoned for his role in the protests. Founding member Will 'Ilolahia was also arrested for helping organise the protests, and faced 10 years in prison if convicted. Following a two-year trial, he was found not guilty, a verdict that was partially attributed to Desmond Tutu flying from South Africa to act as a character witness for the Panthers.

After describing the Panthers as liberators and defenders of human rights, and attributing their actions as playing a role in the end of apartheid, a jury took 1 hour and 10 minutes to find 'Ilolahia not guilty. 'Ilolahia stated stated that as he was leaving the courthouse, police threatened him with violence, forcing him to return to Tonga for his safety. As most of the Panthers' activities at the time were organised by 'Ilolahia, his departure from New Zealand effectively resulted in the end of the organisation.

Amid controversial tours, the Gleneagles Agreement of 1977 gave international support against apartheid in sport.

== Later years ==
In 2006 Panther members released a book to mark the 35th anniversary of the Polynesian Panther movement.

On 12 September 2009 the Polynesian Panthers held a special evening in Auckland to honour American Black Panther revolutionary artist Emory Douglas during his International Artist in Residency at Auckland University's Elam School of Fine Arts.

In 2010 a documentary film made by Nevak 'Ilolahia (niece of Will 'Ilolahia), was released telling the story of the Polynesian Panthers. It was shown on Māori Television's New Zealand documentary slot.

In 2016, activists still operating under the name of The Polynesian Black Panther Party attended the (United States) Black Panther Party's 50th Anniversary Reunion in Oakland, California. This event was held to honour the ideologies brought forth by the Party, as well as commemorate those who are still organizing for the cause. In an interview with Eddie Conway, current Polynesian Panthers were interviewed about the importance of the BPP in influencing their activism and to bring light to their current work for Pacific Islands Safety & Violence Prevention Program: anti-violence against women and girls.

Miriama Rauhihi Ness was interviewed by Te Ao - Māori News in June 2020 where she spoke in support of Black Lives Matter protests.

In 2021, former Polynesian Panther members were among those petitioning the New Zealand government for an official apology for the dawn raids that took place in the mid‑1970s.

In August 2021, the public broadcaster TVNZ released a television series about the Polynesian Panthers called The Panthers on TVNZ 1 and TVNZ On Demand. The series starred Dimitrius Schuster-Koloamatangi as Polynesian Panthers leader Will Ilolahia, and was written by Tom Hern and Halaifonua Finau. The series became the first New Zealand television series to screen at the Toronto International Film Festival.

== See also ==
- Ngā Tamatoa
- Māori protest movement
- 1975 Māori land march
- Citizens' Association for Racial Equality (CARE)
- Samoan Nationality Law
- Progressive Youth Movement and Tim Shadbolt
- Mana Motuhake

=== Global Panther Movements ===
- Dalit Panthers (India)
- Gray Panthers
- Black Panthers (Israel)
- British Black Panthers
