= Can't Get Enough (Supergroove song) =

Single by Supergroove

from the album Traction
- A-side: "Can't Get Enough"
- B-side: "Sister Sister"
- Released: 1994
- Recorded: December 1993
- Studio: York Street Studios
- Genre: Rap rock, funk rock
- Length: 3:26
- Label: BMG, RCA
- Songwriter: Joseph Fisher/Karl Steven
- Producers: Karl Steven, Malcolm Welsford

Supergroove singles chronology
"Scorpio Girls" (1993)	"Can't Get Enough" (1994)	"Sitting Inside My Head" (1994)

"Can't Get Enough" is a 1994 single from New Zealand funk rock band Supergroove. It peaked at number one in the New Zealand singles chart and later charted at 36 in Australia. The song was included on Supergroove's debut album Traction. Long-time TVNZ 2 continuity announcer Warren Thomas made a spoken cameo appearance part way into the song.

== Awards ==
"Can't Get Enough" was nominated for Single of the Year at the 1995 New Zealand Music Awards, with the song's video winning Best Video, along with four other wins for the band.

In 2001 the song was voted by New Zealand members of APRA as the 99th best New Zealand song of the 20th century. The song also appeared on the associated compilation CD Nature's Best 3, and the video was on the Nature's Best DVD.

== Music video ==
The music video was directed by Supergroove's bass player Joe Lonie. Its eclectic visual style was influenced by Fane Flaws' video for The Mutton Birds' song "Nature". The "Can't Get Enough" video won a number of awards, including Best Music Video at the 1995 New Zealand Music Awards, and Best Editing for James Schoning, and Runner-Up Best Video for director Joe Lonie at the 1994 New Zealand Music Video Awards. In 2009 it was ranked number 35 in the New Zealand Film Archive's list of the top 100 New Zealand music videos.

== Track listing ==
CD

1. "Can't Get Enough" - 3:26
2. "Sister Sister - 5:17
3. "Can't Get Enough" (The Strawpeople Mix) - 5:38

== Charts and certifications ==
=== Weekly charts ===
Chart (1994–1995)	Peak position
Australia (ARIA)	32
New Zealand (Recorded Music NZ)	1

=== Year-end charts ===
Chart (1994)	Position
New Zealand (Recorded Music NZ)	5

=== Certifications ===
Region	Certification	Sales/shipments
New Zealand (RMNZ)	1× Platinum	15,000*
*sales figures based on certification alone
