= Tigilau Ness =

Tigilau Ness (born 19 May 1955) is a Niuean New Zealand activist and reggae artist, and performs as Unity Pacific. Ness is a political activist and first generation Pacific Island New Zealander.

== Lifetime achievement award ==
In May 2009, Ness was presented with a Lifetime Achievement Award at the fifth Pacific Music Awards in Auckland, New Zealand in recognition of more than 30 years in the music industry.

== Background ==
After being expelled from Mt Albert Grammar in 1971 for refusing to cut his afro, he was involved in founding the Polynesian Panthers, a Polynesian rights group modelled after the Black Panthers.

He was active in opposing apartheid and the 1981 Springbok Tour. He was arrested during a protest march and spent nine months in Mount Eden Prison. Ness also took part in Māori land protests including the occupation of Bastion Point. He converted to Rastafari during this period.

A veteran musician, Ness was one of the founders of the reggae group the Twelve Tribes of Israel in the 1970s, and started a band called Unity in 1975. He also worked with the band Herbs. He formed the Unity Reggae Band in 1985, but did not release an album until 2003. His struggles against injustice and problems faced growing up in New Zealand, featured on his album From Street to Sky. A documentary of the same name about Ness was released in 2008.

Ness is the father of hip hop musician Che Fu (Che Ness), and often performs as a member of Che's band The Krates.

== Documentaries ==
Ness has featured in documentaries.

From Street to Sky is a one-hour documentary on his life directed and produced by Bryn Evans. Named after Ness' long-awaited first album, From Street to Sky screened on Māori Television in August 2007 and at the New Zealand Film Festival in 2008.

'From Street To Sky is an interesting and touching look at a caring rebel, a formidable protester, and talented musician whose songs reflect a life devoted to unity and compassion.' NZ Herald, July 2008

In 2008, Ness featured with his son Che Fu in the documentary Children of the Revolution about the children of political activists in New Zealand which also included Māori activist Tame Iti, Māori Party Member of Parliament Hone Harawira, Green Party Member of Parliament Sue Bradford and anti-apartheid leader John Minto. Made by Front of the Box Productions, Children of the Revolution screened on Māori Television and won Best Māori Language Programme at the Qantas Television Awards 2008. Also in 2008, Ness was the subject of a half-hour art documentary Tigilau Ness on The Gravy Art Series made by Sticky Pictures and screened on TVNZ6. In 2011, Ness and Che Fu were featured in Sons from Afar, a documentary for Māori Television in which they travelled to their homeland of Mutalau, Niue for the first time together.
