= DLT (musician) =

- Birth name: Darryl Leigh Thomson
- Origin: Wellington, New Zealand
- Genres: Pop; hip hop; reggae; rap
- Occupation(s): Musician, producer, visual artist
- Instrument: Turntables
- Years active: 1983–2011
- Labels: BMG
- Formerly of: Upper Hutt Posse

DLT or Darryl Leigh Thomson, is a New Zealand hip hop DJ, music producer and composer as well as a visual artist. He was a founding member of Upper Hutt Posse (UHP). As a solo artist DLT issued two albums, The True School (1996) and Altruism (2000) – both peaked on the New Zealand albums chart top 20. His most successful single, "Chains" (1996), featuring vocals by Che Fu, reached number one on the New Zealand singles chart.

== Biography ==
Darryl Leigh Thomson, was born in Maraenui, New Zealand. DLT was inspired by an article about rap and break dancing in Life magazine when he was 16 years of age; he moved to Wellington in the early 1980s and established himself as a graffiti artist known as Slick (1983) before co-founding hip hop group Upper Hutt Posse (UHP). UHP released New Zealand's first hip hop recording, "E Tū", in 1988, with DLT "the first ever DJ to scratch on a locally produced record." UHP relocated to Auckland. Upper Hutt Posse signed to Murray Cammick's label, Southside Records, and released the album Against the Flow in 1989.

Leaving the Upper Hutt Posse in 1992, DLT released two solo albums. The first, The True School, which reached number 12 on the New Zealand charts. It provided the single "Chains" (1996), which was the number one single in New Zealand for five weeks in 1996 and featured the vocals of Che Fu. In the 1997 New Zealand Music Awards "Chains" was named Single of the Year and won the Best Songwriting award. Che Fu was named Best Male Vocalist. It was number 22 in the 2001 APRA listing of the Greatest New Zealand Songs of the previous 75 years. By 2023, it was certified Platinum by RMNZ.

DLT's production work in the 1980s and 1990s was a pointer to and influential on the reggae-flavoured downbeat styles that have found favour in New Zealand in recent years.

His radio and TV work in New Zealand, especially The True School Show on Radio 95bFM, has been important in the development of hip hop in New Zealand. DLT hosted 'Trueschool TV' on Max TV in 1996 with DJ Sir-Vere – they were later poached for MTV's 'Wreckognise' show, which gave them nationwide coverage.

DLT is often described as the Godfather of New Zealand Hip Hop.

== Art ==
DLT is an accomplished sculptor, graffiti artist, graphic artist and painter.

== Discography ==
- The True School (1996)
- Altruism (2000)

== See also ==
- New Zealand hip hop
