= Che Fu =

New Zealand singer, songwriter and producer

Che Fu MNZM
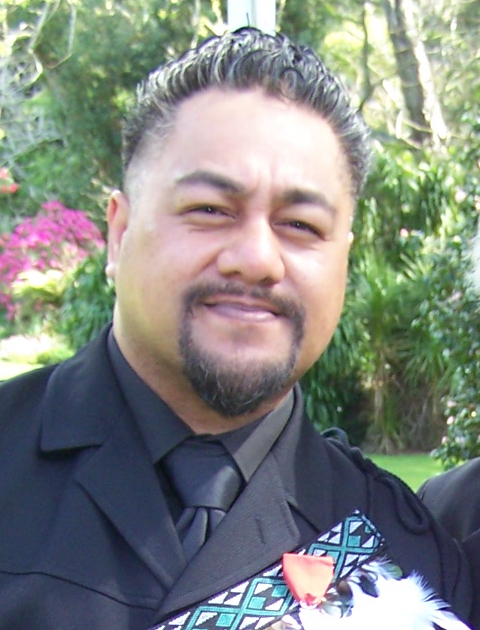
- Fu in 2009

Background information
- Born: Che Kuo Eruera Ness; 1974 (age 51–52)
- Origin: Auckland, New Zealand
- Genres: Hip hop; reggae; soul; funk; R&B
- Occupations: Singer; songwriter; rapper; record producer
- Years active: 1989–present
- Label: Sony/BMG
- Website: Facebook; Che Fu The Musician

Che Kuo Eruera Ness MNZM (born 1974), better known by his stage name Che Fu (stylised as Ché-Fu), is a New Zealand singer, songwriter and producer. A founding member of the band Supergroove, as a solo artist he has gone on to sell thousands of albums both in New Zealand and internationally. Che Fu is considered a pioneer of hip hop and Pasifika music in New Zealand.

== Early life ==
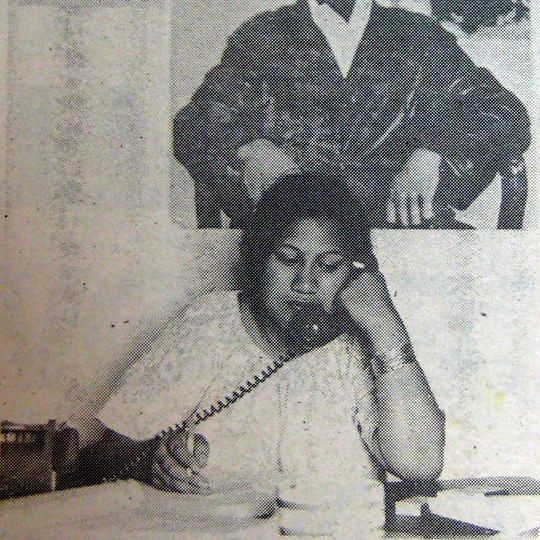
Miriama Rauhihi Ness, Fu's mother, 1977

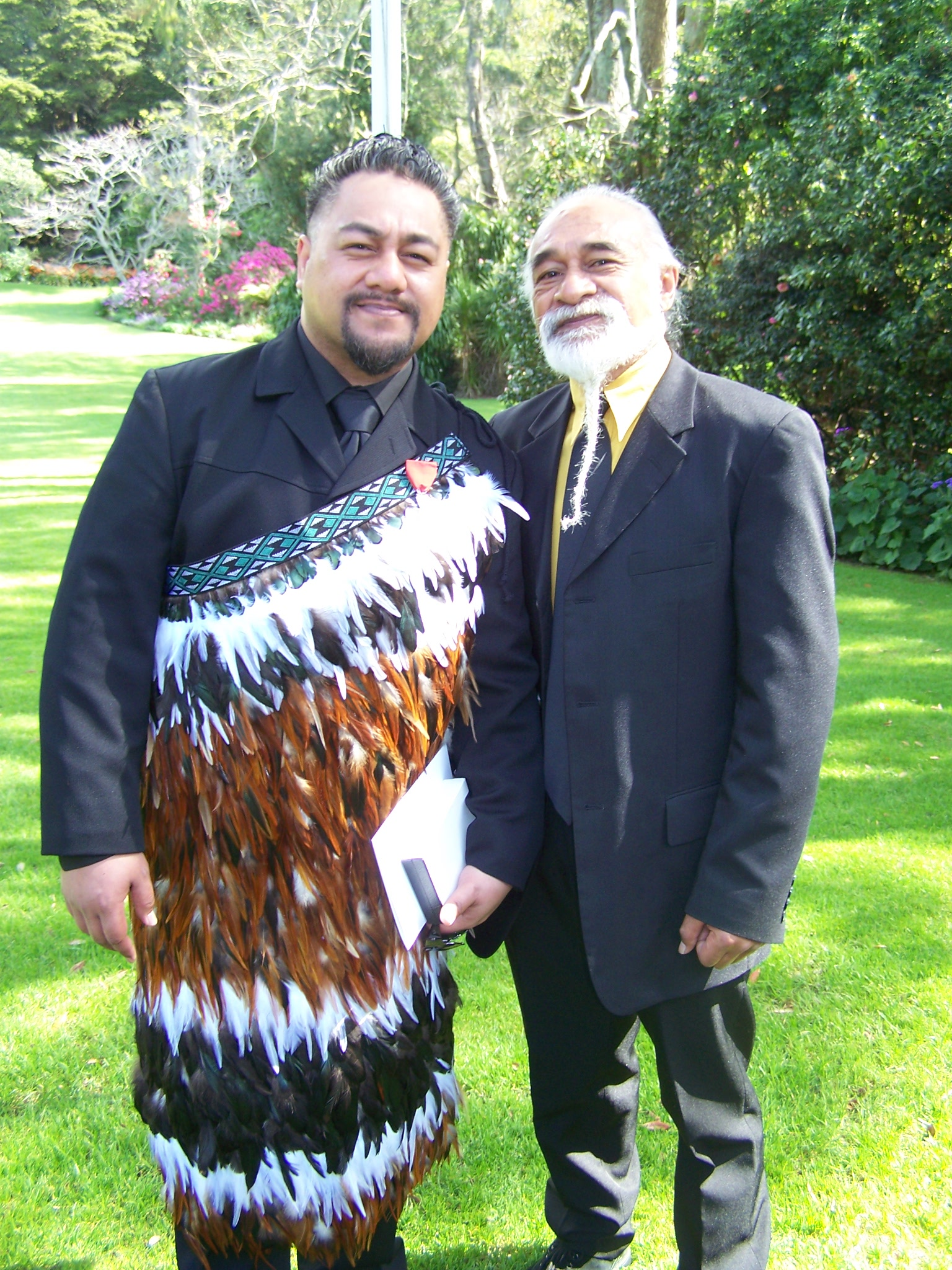
Fu with Tigilau Ness, his father

Che Fu was born Che Ness in Auckland. His mother, Miriama Rauhihi Ness is of Māori descent and his father Tigilau Ness is Niuean. Fu's parents are well-known political activists, notably as members of the Polynesian-rights group, the Polynesian Panthers, and founding members of Rastafarian movement 12 Tribes of Israel. Tigilau is a musician and part of the band Unity Pacific as well as his son's band, The Krates. The Ness family are Rastafarians.

== Career ==
=== Supergroove (1994–1996) ===
While a student at Western Springs College, Fu and a group of friends formed the Low Down Dirty Blues Band, who later became Supergroove. Supergroove released their debut album Traction in 1994. The album went triple platinum in New Zealand and won five Tuis. Before finishing their second album, Backspacer, Fu left Supergroove to pursue a solo career.

=== Solo career (1996–1997) ===
Fu was invited to record a single with well-known New Zealand DJ DLT. The song "Chains" protested French nuclear testing in the Pacific and was released in July 1996, within weeks of Fu leaving Supergroove. "Chains" was a Number One hit on the New Zealand Singles Charts and won three Tuis, namely Single of the year, Best male vocalist, and Best songwriter. This marked the beginning of Fu's solo career and brought prominence to Hip Hop in New Zealand.

=== 2b S.Pacific (1998–2000) ===
In 1998, Fu released his debut album 2b S.Pacific. The album went double platinum and spawned four top-ten hits, which was unheard-of for a local hip hop artist at the time. The following year, he received the Single of the year award for Scene III. Fu subsequently formed a band named The Krates for studio work and live performances. Paul Russell, previous drummer for Supergroove, is part of The Krates line-up.

=== Navigator (2001–2003) ===
Fu released his follow-up album Navigator in 2001, debuting at number one and generating triple platinum sales. At the 2002 New Zealand Music Awards, Fu took home five Tui awards: Single of the year for "Fade Away", Album of the year, Top male vocalist, Best R&B / Hip hop album, and Best music video. That same year, Fu received the APRA Silver Scroll for his single "Misty Frequencies". He went on to win Best male vocalist in 2003 for "Misty Frequencies".

=== Beneath the Radar and Hi-Score: The Best of Che Fu (2005–2007) ===
Fu's next album Beneath the Radar was released in 2005, led out by singles "2D" and "Lightwork". However, the record was not as successful as previous works. The following year Fu released Hi-Score – The Best of Che Fu, a compilation of hit singles from his previous three albums including "Fade Away", "Waka" and "Without a Doubt", as well as four new singles.

=== Collaborations (2008) ===
Fu teamed up with the Glass Packaging Forum to promote glass recycling with youth. The Forum hosted a competition for 9- to 15-year-olds to write rap lyrics encouraging recycling. The winners recorded their lyrics with Fu in a single called "Do the krusher".

Fu also collaborated with Kimbra and hip hop group Nesian Mystik on their top-ten single "Mr Mista".

=== Hedlok (2010–2013) ===
Che Fu & The Krates continued to tour New Zealand and Australia. As well, Fu performs alongside another hip hop legend, Samoan rapper King Kapisi as one-half of the group Hedlok.

=== Lifetime Achievement Award (2014) ===
Fu's contribution to New Zealand music was recognised when he was awarded the Lifetime Achievement Award at the 2014 Pacific Music Awards.

== Personal life ==
In 2011, Fu and his father Tigilau were featured in a documentary for Māori Television in which they travelled to their homeland of Mutalau, Niue for the first time together. While in Niue, Fu married his long-time partner Angela McDonald. Fu and his wife have four sons, Loxmyn, Marley, Jeru, and Kaselle, whom they are raising in the Rastafarian faith.

Fu is also a serious sneaker collector. Fu developed his love for sneakers in 1989 when he purchased his first pair of Air Jordan IV. Along with a few of his friends, including Dj Sir-vere, they created the PacHeat Crew and regularly organises the biggest sneaker swap meet events in New Zealand. One of his favourite sneakers is Air Jordan IV Retro Black Laser which he stated in New Zealand Sneakerhead Documentary 2021.

== Discography ==
=== Studio albums ===
Title	Details	Peak chart positions	Certifications
Title	Details	NZ	Certifications
2b S.Pacific	Label: BMG; Catalogue: 74321 629922	2	RMNZ: Platinum
Navigator	Label: Epic	1	RMNZ: Platinum
Beneath the Radar	Label: Sony; Catalogue: 82876729632	7	RMNZ: Gold

==== With Supergroove ====
- Traction (1994) BMG
- Backspacer (1996) BMG
- Postage (2003) BMG

=== Singles ===
Title	Year	Peak Chart Positions		Certifications	Album
Title	Year	NZ	AUS	Certifications	Album
"Chains" (DLT featuring Che Fu)	1996	1	—	RMNZ: Platinum	The True School / 2b S.Pacific
"The Son" (with Dam Native)	1997	25	—		Kaupapa Driven Rhymes Uplifted
"Scene III"	1998	4	—		2b S.Pacific
"Without a Doubt" / "Machine Talk"	1998	1	—		2b S.Pacific
"Waka"	1999	6	—	RMNZ: Platinum	2b S.Pacific
"Fade Away"	2001	2	72	RMNZ: 3× Platinum	Navigator
"Random"	2001	19	—		Navigator
"Misty Frequencies"	2002	10	—	RMNZ: 4× Platinum	Navigator
"U Can't Resist Us" (King Kapisi featuring Che Fu)	2003	9	—		2nd round Testament
"2D"	2005	—	—		Beneath the Radar
"Lightwork"	2006	—	—		Beneath the Radar
"Spin 1" (featuring Aaradhna)	2006	20	—	RMNZ: Gold	Hi-Score – The Best of Che Fu
"—" denotes releases that did not chart or were not released in that country.

=== Other certified songs ===
Title	Year	Certifications	Album
"Hold Tight"	2001	RMNZ: Gold	Navigator

== Honours and awards ==
- 2002 – APRA Silver Scroll Awards: Che Ness (Che Fu) and Godfrey de Grut, "Misty Frequencies"
- 2009 – Appointed a Member of the New Zealand Order of Merit, for services to music, in the 2009 Queen's Birthday Honours
- 2014 – Pacific Music Awards Lifetime Achievement Award

=== RIANZ Awards ===
Year	Award	Work	As	Result
1995	Album of the Year	Traction	Supergroove	Won
1995	Single of the Year	"Can't Get Enough"	Supergroove	Nominated
1996	International Achievement		Supergroove	Nominated
1997	Single of the Year	"Chains"	DLT feat Che Fu	Won
1997	Best Male Vocalist	"Chains"		Won
1997	Best Songwriter	"Chains"	Dl Thompson, C Ness, A McNaughton, K Rangihuna	Won
1999	Single of the Year	"Scene III"	Che Fu	Won
1999	Album of the Year	2b S Pacific		Nominated
1999	Best Producer	2b S Pacific	Che Fu & Andy Morton	Nominated
2002	Album of the Year	Navigator	Che Fu	Won
2002	Single of the Year	"Fade Away"	Che Fu	Won
2002	Top Male Vocalist	Navigator	Che Fu	Won
2002	Best R&B/Hip Hop Album	Navigator	Che Fu	Won
2002	Best Songwriter	"Fade Away"	Che Fu	Nominated
2002	Best Cover Design	"Fade Away"	Che Fu and Kelvin Soh	Nominated
2003	Single of the Year	"Misty Frequencies"	Che Fu	Nominated
2003	Best Male Vocalist	"Misty Frequencies"	Che Fu	Won
2003	Best Music Video	"Misty Frequencies"	Che Fu	Won
2003	Songwriter of the Year	"Misty Frequencies"	Che Fu	Nominated
2006	Best Male Solo Artist	Beneath the Radar	Che Fu	Nominated
