= Backspacer (Supergroove album) =

Studio album by Supergroove
- Released: 19 September 1996
- Genre: Rock; Funk rock
- Length: 52:03
- Label: RCA Records

Supergroove chronology
GreatMixes (1994)	Backspacer (1996)	Postage (2003)

Backspacer is the second and final studio album by New Zealand rock band Supergroove, released on 19 September 1996. It was released in 1996 by RCA Records. Before recording, creative differences saw vocalist Che Ness and trumpeter Tim Stewart fired from the band. The album is musically very different from their first, being less funk and more straight rock, with a darker and more melancholy feeling in songs like "Dear Mother (Don't Let Me Go)", "This Stupid Grin" and "The Decline and Fall of Us Both."

Supergroove toured the album without Che Ness but due to poor reception and sales of the record and without Che Ness, Supergroove broke up soon after in 1997.

Three singles were released from the album, "Only Ever You", "If I Had My Way" (a top 10 hit) and "5th Wheel".

== Reviews ==
Across the globe, the album received a poor review in Norway's largest newspaper Verdens Gang. Giving it a dice throw of 3 out of 6, the reviewer stated that Backspacer lacked "the same drive and energy" as Traction, and that the songwriting was "middle of the road".

== Track listing ==
All tracks written by Joe Lonie and Karl Steven except "Who's Side Are You on Anyway?" and "5th Wheel" by Lonie, Steven, and Ben Sciascia.

No.	Title	Length
1.	"Only Ever You"	4:47
2.	"Backspaced"	4:12
3.	"Windows"	4:29
4.	"This Stupid Grin"	4:13
5.	"Dear Mother (Don't Let Me Go)"	6:31
6.	"If I Had My Way"	5:50
7.	"My Best"	3:45
8.	"Who's Side Are You on Anyway?"	3:28
9.	"The Decline & Fall of Us Both"	4:31
10.	"Shameless"	4:27
11.	"5th Wheel"	5:44
Total length:		52:03

Source: Spotify.
