= Supergroove =

New Zealand funk rock band

- Also known as: Low Down Dirty Blues Band
- Origin: Auckland, New Zealand
- Genres: Funk rock, Rap rock
- Years active: 1989–1997, 2007–present
- Label: BMG
- Members: Che Ness; Karl Steven; Joe Lonie; Tim Stewart; Ben Sciascia; Ian Jones; Nick Atkinson
- Past members: Paul Russell

Supergroove is a New Zealand funk rock music group. Their debut album Traction was released in 1994. The group disbanded in 1997 but reformed in 2007.

== History ==
The band was founded on New Year's Eve 1989/1990, having previously been named the Low-Down Dirty Blues Band.

Prior to Supergroove's second album Backspacer, singer Che Fu and trumpeter Tim Stewart were fired from the band.

== Solo careers ==
Notable former members include Che Ness, a.k.a. Che Fu, now with a successful solo career, Paul Russell, who still studio drums with Che Fu. Two other ex-members, Tim Stewart (trumpet) and Ben Sciascia (guitar) formed a new band in late 2005 called Svelte with Stewart on Lead vocals and Bass. Stewart went on to form Hopetoun Brown, a two-piece band, with fellow ex-Groover, Nick Atkinson - they released their first album in 2015 and also often appear together as the horn section for other performers including Tami Neilson, Dave Dobbyn and Don McGlashan.

Karl Steven, who left the band to study at university, is now an award-winning film and television composer.

== Reunions ==
Supergroove continued in 2007 on a summer tour, playing alongside popular New Zealand bands such as Atlas, Elemeno P, The Feelers and were one of the headline Kiwi acts of the Big Day Out 2008 in Auckland. The band featured in the University of Otago's, the University of Canterbury's and the University of Waikato's 2008 orientation weeks.

Supergroove played at the Groove in the Park 2010 festival held on New Zealand's Waitangi Day (6 February), at the Western Springs in Auckland. Supergroove also played at the Homegrown Festival in Wellington on 14 March 2009.

Supergroove returned for another reunion tour in April 2025, featuring the original lineup (saxophonist Nick Atkinson, vocalists Karl Steven and Che Fu, drummer Ian Jones, bassist Joe Lonie, guitarist Ben Sciascia and trumpeter Tim Stewart). This tour started on 7 April 2025 in Rotorua and ended 27 April, with 14 shows in 9 venues. Apart from the main centres, they also had shows in Whanganui, Nelson, Invercargill and Havelock North. Troy Kingi, Rubi Du and DJ King Kapisi joined them, not so much as support as "intertwined" into the shows. Support from the public was so strong that several extra nights had to be added.

== Members ==
Current

- Che Ness – vocals (1989–1995, 2007-present)
- Karl Steven – vocals, keyboards, harmonica (1989–1997, 2007-present)
- Ben Sciascia – guitar (1989–1997, 2007-present)
- Joe Lonie – bass (1989–1997, 2007-present)
- Tim Stewart – trumpet (1989–1995, 2007-present)
- Nick Atkinson – saxophone (1989–1997, 2007-present), keyboards (1995–1997)
- Ian Jones – drums (1994-1997, 2007-present)

Former

- Paul Russell – drums (1989–1994)

== Discography ==
=== Albums ===
Year	Album	Peak chart positions		Certifications (sales thresholds)
Year	Album	NZ	AUS	Certifications (sales thresholds)
1994	Traction: Label: BMG; Catalogue number: 74321 27954 2	1	46	NZ: Platinum
1996	Backspacer: Label: RCA	2	—	NZ: Gold
2003	Postage: Label: BMG	10	—	

=== EPs ===
Year	Album	Peak chart positions	Certifications (sales thresholds)
Year	Album	NZ	Certifications (sales thresholds)
1994	Tractor	2	NZ: Platinum
1996	GreatMixes: Label: BMG; 74321 30851 2	34	

=== Singles ===
Year	Title	Peak chart positions		Certifications	Album
Year	Title	NZ	AUS	Certifications	Album
1992	"Here Comes The Supergroove"	21	—		Non-album single
1993	"You Gotta Know"	4	57	RMNZ: Gold	Traction
1993	"Scorpio Girls"	3	—	RMNZ: Gold	Traction
1994	"Can't Get Enough"	1	32	RMNZ: Platinum	Traction
1994	"Sitting Inside My Head"	6	—	RMNZ: 4× Platinum	Traction
1996	"If I Had My Way"	7	—		Backspacer
1996	"5th Wheel"	—	—		Backspacer
2003	"For Whatever Remix"	—	—		Postage

== Awards ==
=== New Zealand Music Awards ===
Year	Nominee / work	Award	Result	Ref
1994	Malcolm Welsford – "You Gotta Know"	Best Engineer	Nominated	
1995	Traction	Album of the Year	Won	
1995	"Can't Get Enough"	Single of the Year	Nominated	
1995	Supergroove	Best Group	Won	
1995	Jo Fischer and Matt Noonan – "Can't Get Enough"	Best Video	Won	
1995	Karl Steven & Malcolm Welsford – Traction	Best Producer	Won	
1995	Malcolm Welsford – Traction	Best Engineer	Won	
1996	Supergroove	International Achievement	Nominated	
1996	Sigi Spath and Jo Fisher – "You Gotta Know"	Best Video	Won	
1997	Sigi Spath and Joe Lonie – "If I Had My Way"	Best Video	Won	
1997	Malcolm Welsford and Karl Steven – Backspacer	Best Producer	Won	
1997	Malcolm Welsford – Backspacer	Best Engineer	Nominated	
2014	Supergroove	Legacy Award	Awarded	
