= Aotearoa Music Award for Best Electronic Artist =

Annual New Zealand music award

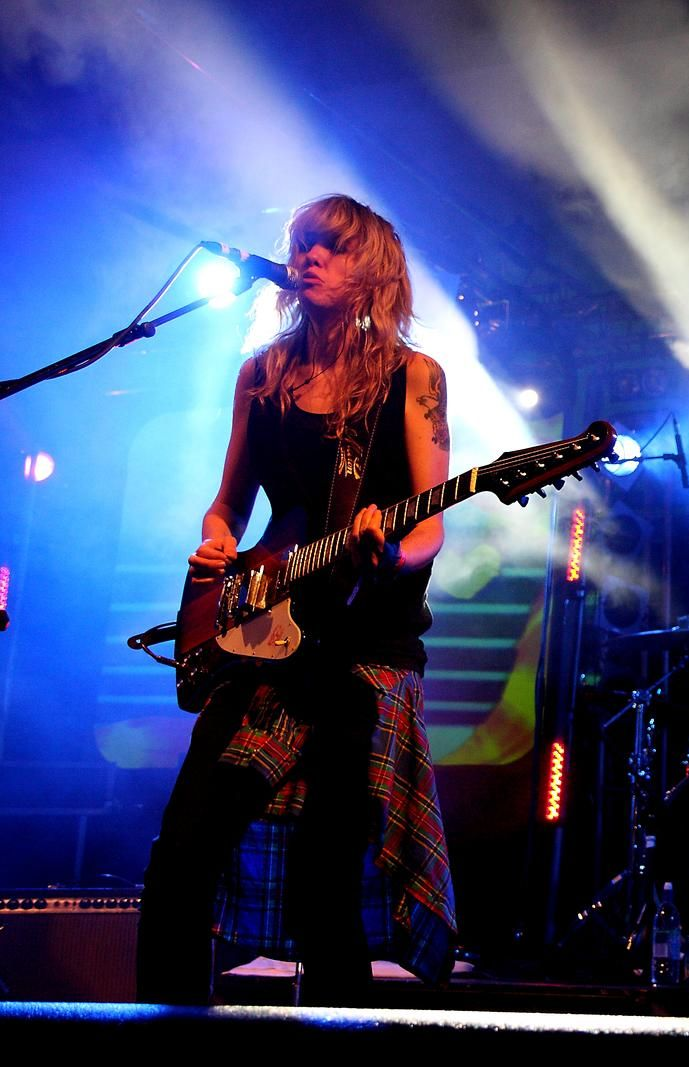
Ladyhawke won the award in 2009 with her self-titled album.

Best Electronic Artist (Māori: Te Manu Taki Tāhiko o te Tau) is an Aotearoa Music Award that honours New Zealand artists for outstanding dance-pop and electronica recordings.

The inaugural award was presented as Best Electronica Album in 2002 to Sola Rosa for their album Solarized. The following year the award was renamed Best Dance Album, then in 2004 the award was again renamed, this time to Best Dance/Electronica Album. In 2010 the award reverted to Best Electronica Album, and from 2016 it became Best Electronic Album. In 2017 the award was changed to Best Electronic Artist with the entry criteria changed to require either an album or a minimum of five single releases in the eligibility period.

Salmonella Dub and Concord Dawn have each won the award twice, while Shapeshifter has been nominated six times but won only once.

== Recipients ==
=== Best Electronica Album (2002) ===
Year	Artist	Album	Other nominees	Ref.
2002	Sola Rosa	Solarized	Rhian Sheehan - Paradigm Shift; Shapeshifter - Real Time	

=== Best Dance Album (2003) ===
Year	Artist	Album	Other nominees	Ref.
2003	Salmonella Dub	Outside the Dubplates	Rhombus – Bass Player; Subware – Subware	

=== Best Dance/Electronica Album (2004 to 2009) ===
Year	Artist	Album	Other nominees	Ref.
2004	Salmonella Dub	One Drop East	Concord Dawn – Uprising; Shapeshifter – Riddim Wise LP	
2005	Del Rey System	Del Rey System	Audiosauce – Contimental Drift; Baitercell & Schumacher – The Wall of Bass Technique; Mark de Clive-Lowe – Tide's Arising	
2006	Concord Dawn	Chaos by Design	Recloose – Hiatus on the Horizon; Sola Rosa – Moves On	
2007	Shapeshifter	Soulstice	Bulletproof – Shake The Foundations; State of Mind – Take Control	
2008	Recloose	Perfect Timing	Magik Johnson – You Are Sound; Shapeshifter – Shapeshifter Live	
2009	Ladyhawke	Ladyhawke	Antiform – City In Exile; Sola Rosa – Get It Together	

=== Best Electronica Album (2010 to 2015) ===
Year	Artist	Album	Other nominees	Ref.
2010	Bulletproof	Soundtrack to Forever	P-Money – Everything; Shapeshifter – The System Is a Vampire	
2011	Tiki Taane	In the World of Light	State of Mind – Nil By Ear; Concord Dawn – The Enemy Within	
2012	Concord Dawn	Air Chrysalis	Bulletproof – Dub Me Crazy; Six60 – Six60	
2013	Shapeshifter	Delta	K+LAB - Space Dirt; Sola Rosa - Low and Behold, High and Beyond	
2014	Opiuo	Meraki	Bulletproof - #Listen; Opiuo - Meraki; Sorceress - Dose	
2015	Electric Wire Hustle	Love Can Prevail	Shapeshifter vs The Upbeats – SSXUB; Sola Rosa – Magnetics	

=== Best Electronic Album (2016) ===
Year	Artist	Album	Other nominees	Ref.
2016	Pacific Heights	The Stillness	Electric Wire Hustle – Aeons; Opiuo – Omniversal	

=== Best Electronic Artist / Te Kaipuoro Tāhiko Toa (2017 to current) ===
Year	Artist	Other nominees	Ref.
2017	Truth	Chaos in the CBD; K+Lab	
2018	Chores	Arma Del Amor; Boycrush	
2019	Tali	Pacific Heights; Sweet Mix Kids	
2020	Lee Mvtthews	State of Mind; Truth	
2021	Paige Julia	Shapeshifter; Sola Rosa	
2022	LEAPING TIGER	Julien Dyne; TALI	
2023	No awards held		
2024	Amamelia	deepState; Elipsa	
2025	Mokotron	Chaii; Lee Mvtthews	
