= BNet NZ Music Awards =

bNet NZ Music Award
- Awarded for: Excellence in New Zealand music
- Location: Auckland
- Country: New Zealand
- Presented by: bNet
- Reward: 'b' trophy
- First award: 1998
- Final award: 2007

Television/radio coverage
- Network: TV2

The bNet NZ Music Awards was an annual New Zealand music award presentation organised by New Zealand student radio network bNet from 1998 to 2007.

== History ==
The awards began in 1998 and were originally known as the 95bFM Music Awards, run by Auckland student radio station bFM. In 1999, the awards were expanded to include other bNet stations, were renamed the bNet Music Awards, and later became the bNet NZ Music Awards.

Founded as an alternative to RIANZ's New Zealand Music Awards, the bNet awards were largely determined by a public vote, and in early years the awards had irreverent categories such as Male Fox and Female Fox, Most Incomprehensible Lyric and Biggest Cock-Up. But the awards also included categories that were otherwise overlooked by mainstream music awards of the time, such as Best DJ, Best Independent Album and Best Website. 2007 was the final year the bNet Awards were held.

== 1998 bFM Music Awards ==
The first awards were called the bFM Music Awards and were organised by Auckland student radio station bFM. The awards ceremony was held in August 1998 at the Mandalay venue in Newmarket, Auckland.

Winners (Partial list)

Album Of The Year: The Stereo Bus The Stereo Bus
Best Dance Party: The Gathering
Best Music Video: Darcy Clay "Jesus I Was Evil"
Best Live Audio Engineer: Tiki Taane
Best Breakbeat DJ: Manuel Bundy
DJ of the Year: Greg Churchill
Best Unreleased Song: The Cosmetics "Can't Believe"

== 1999 bNet Music Awards ==
In 1999 the awards were renamed the bNet Music Awards to reflect the involvement of the bNet radio network. The awards were presented at the Mandalay venue in Newmarket, Auckland on Saturday August 28, 1999. Awards were presented in 34 categories, with 23 decided by public vote and 11 by a panel of judges. Categories included Most Astonishing Chart Placement, Most Incomprehensible Lyric, Best Independent Record Label, Contribution to New Zealand Music by a Major Label, Promoter or Promotion of a New Zealand Tour, and Luckiest Manager.

Winners (Partial list)

Male Fox: King Kapisi
Female Fox: Julia Deans
Best Live Audio Engineer: Tiki Taane
Best Hiphop DJ: Manuel Bundy
Best Live Electronica Act: Pitch Black
Best Album: Salmonella Dub Killervision
Best Independent Release: Fur Patrol Starlifter
Best Song: Salmonella Dub "For the Love Of It"
Best Hip-Hop/Reggae/Dub Release: Salmonella Dub Killervision
Best Electronica Release: Pitch Black Futureproof
Best Rock/Pop Release: Shihad Blue Light Disco
Best Live Act: Salmonella Dub
Best New Act: Polaar
Best Vocalist: Che Fu
Best Guitarist: Tom Watson, Head Like A Hole
Best Drummer: Isaac Tucker, The New Loungehead
Best Bassist: Mark Tyler, Salmonella Dub
Best Keyboardist: Paddy Free, Pitch Black
Best Independent Record Label: Kog Transmissions
Best International Achievement: Shihad
Lifetime Achievement Award: Trevor Reekie

== 2000 bNet Music Awards ==
The 2000 awards were held at the Powerstation venue in Auckland on Saturday 26 August 2000. Performing at the awards were hip hop crew Four Corners, noise band HDU, and Rock'n'Roll Machine, who set fire to a guitar.

Winners

Best cover art: Shihad The General Electric
Best NZ music website: www.loopsandsamples.co.nz
Best DJ: Manuel Bundy
Best turntablist: P-Money
Most promising DJ: Philippa
Best live act: Shihad
Best live event: Big Day Out 2000
Most outstanding musician: Nathan Haines
Best vocalist: Che Fu
Best hip hop/reggae/dub release: Tie: The Nomad "Second Selection", King Kapisi "Reverse Resistance"
Best electronica release: Algorhythm 2
Best rock/pop release: Shihad The General Electric
Best independent release: Sola Rosa Entrance to Skyway
Best unreleased song: The Dub Connection "All the Goodness"
Best new act: Shapeshifter
Best music video: Shihad "My Mind's Sedate"
Best song: King Kapisi "Reverse Resistance"
Best album: Shihad The General Electric
Best studio engineer/producer: Andy Morton
Best live engineer: Chris Tate
International achievement: Mark de Clive-Lowe
Lifetime achievement award: Chris Knox

== 2001 bNet Music Awards ==
The 2001 presentation was held at the Bruce Mason Centre in Takapuna, Auckland on Friday 7 September. Jakob played at the event.

Winners

Best Live Act: Shapeshifter
Best Electronic Release: Shapeshifter D.N.A.
Best Cover Art: King Kapisi Savage Thoughts
Best Music Video: King Kapisi "Screems From Da Old Plantation"
Best Music Website: nzmusic.com
Best DJ: Greg Churchill
Best Turntablist: P-Money
Best Live Act: King Kapisi
Best Event: Big Day Out 2001
Most Outstanding Musician: Shayne Carter (Dimmer)
Best Vocalist: Che Fu
Best Downbeat Release: Pitch Black Electronomicon
Best Hip Hop Release: King Kapisi Savage Thoughts
Best Electronic Release: Concord Dawn Disturbance
Best Rock Release: Dimmer I Believe You Are A Star
Best Compilation: The Gathering compilation 3
Best Unreleased Song: P-Money (featuring Scribe) "Sunshine"
Best New Act: Goodshirt
Best Song: King Kapisi "Screems From Da Old Plantation"
Best Independent Album: Concord Dawn Disturbance
Best Album: King Kapisi Savage Thoughts

== 2002 bNet Music Awards ==
The 2002 awards were held at the Bruce Mason Centre in Takapuna, Auckland on Friday 6 September 2002. The event was later broadcast on TV2. bFM DJs and television presenters Mark Williams and Otis Frizzell presented the evening. The Dubious Brothers, Mestar and Subware performed. A compilation CD of nominated songs titled Heads Up!!! Music from the 2002 bNet New Zealand Music Awards was released on Festival Mushroom Records.

Winners

Best Music Video: Che Fu "Fade Away"
Best Live Act: Salmonella Dub
Most Promising New Act: Rhombus
Best Downbeat Release: The Black Seeds Keep On Pushing
Best Hip Hop Release: P-Money Big Things
Best Electronic Release: Shapeshifter Realtime
Best NZ Remix: Manuel Bundy/Che Fu "Misty Frequencies"
Best Pop/Rock Release: Betchadupa The Alphabetchadupa
Best Compilation: - Flying Nun Records Under the Influence
Best Unreleased Song:The Phoenix Foundation The Drinker
Best Song: Salmonella Dub "Tha Bromley East Roller"
Best Album: Salmonella Dub: Inside the Dub Plates
International Achievement: The D4

== 2003 bNet Music Awards ==
The 2003 awards were held on Friday 19 September at the Bruce Mason Centre in Takapuna, Auckland and were presented by bFM DJ Hugh Sundae. The D4 performed at the presentation. Most of the winners were determined by public vote, with only the Radio Play, International Achievement, Best Musician and Best Producer awards decided by a voting panel.

Winners

Best Video: Rhombus "Clav Dub"
Best Live Act: The Datsuns
Most Promising New Act: Verse Two
Best Downbeat Release: Salmonella Dub "Outside The Dub Plates"
Best Hip Hop Release: Nesian Mystik "Polysaturated"
Best Electronic Release: Rhombus "Bass Player"
Best NZ Remix: Blacklisted "Push on Thru" (Salmonella Dub)
Best Pop Release: Goldenhorse "Riverhead"
Best Rock Release: The Datsuns "The Datsuns"
Best Compilation: Dub Combinations Chapter 3
Best Unreleased Song: Baitercell vs Timmy Schumacher "Nasty Gymnastix"
Best Song: Concord Dawn "Morning Light"
Best Album: Rhombus "Bass Player"
Best Vocalist/MC: Scribe
Most bNet Radio Play: Concord Dawn "Morning Light"
International Achievement: The Datsuns
Best Musician: Warren Maxwell (TrinityRoots and Fat Freddy's Drop)
Best Producer: Chris Faiumu - Mu (Fat Freddy's Drop)

== 2004 bNet Music Awards ==
The 2004 awards were held at the Bruce Mason Centre in Takapuna, Auckland on Friday 10 September. The presentation evening featured performances from Deja Voodoo, Minuit, the Bleeders, Frontline, Breakin Wreckwordz and The Fanatics.

Winners

Best Video: Misfits Of Science "Fools Love"
Best Live Act: Fat Freddy's Drop
Most Promising New Act: The Checks
Best Downbeat Release: Sola Rosa Haunted Outtakes
Best Hip Hop Release: Scribe The Crusader
Best Electronic Release: Concord Dawn Uprising
Best NZ Remix: Scribe "Not Many Remix"
Best Pop Release: The Black Seeds On The Sun
Best Rock Release: The Mint Chicks Octagon, Octagon, Octagon
Best Compilation: A Low Hum
Best Unreleased Song: Opensouls "In Our Hands"
Best Song: The Mint Chicks "Post No Bills"
Best Album: Concord Dawn Uprising
Most b.Net Radio Play: Shapeshifter "Been Missing"
Outstanding Achievement: Scribe

== 2005 bNet NZ Music Awards ==
The 2005 awards were held at the Auckland Town Hall on Friday May 27, 2005. This year saw a return of the Male and Female Fox awards, last presented in 1999.

Winners

Best Video: The Mint Chicks "Opium of the People"
Best Live Act: TrinityRoots
Most Promising New Act: The Sneaks
Best Downbeat Release: TrinityRoots Home, Land and Sea
Best Hip Hop Release: P-Money Magic City
Best Electronic Release: Minuit The Guns EP
Best Pop Release: Fly My Pretties "Live at Bats"
Best Rock Release: The Mint Chicks Anti-Tiger EP
Best Compilation: Loop Select 006 Kono
Best DVD: Flying Nun: Second Season
Best Unreleased Song: The Phoenix Foundation "Hitchcock"
Best Song: Pluto "Dance Stamina"
Best Album: TrinityRoots "Home, Land and Sea"
Most Outstanding Musician: Mu (Fat Freddy's Drop)
Best Producer: Mu (Fat Freddys Drop)
Best Cover Art: The Mint Chicks Anti-Tiger EP
Best Male Vocalist: Dallas Tamaira
Best Female Vocalist: Heather Mansfield
Male Fox: Shayne Carter
Female Fox: Kirsten Morrell
Most b.Net Radio Play: The Checks "Mercedes Children"
Biggest Cock-Up: Shihad naming themselves Pacifier
Most Memorable Moment: Pacifier naming themselves Shihad
International Achievement: The Brunettes
Lifetime Achievement: Shayne Carter

== 2006 bNet NZ Music Awards ==
The 2006 bNet New Zealand Music Awards were held on Saturday 16 December at the Northern Steamship Company bar in Auckland. The event included live performances from Ladi6 and SJD and was broadcast live on all bNet radio stations.

Winners

Radio One Song of the Year: Anji Sami "El Dorado"
RDU Song of the Year: Shocking Pinks "Second Hand Girl"
Radio Active Song of the Year: The Mint Chicks "Crazy? Yes! Dumb? No!"
Radio Control Song of the Year: Black Chrome - "My Band"
The Most FM Song of the Year: Kapital "Something Real"
95bFM Song of the Year: Voom "B Your Boy"
Best Downbeat/Dub Track: Kora "Flow"
Best Hip-Hop Track: Opensouls "What Do You Do?"
Best Pop Track: The Phoenix Foundation "Damn the River"
Best Rock Track: The Mint Chicks "Welcome to Nowhere"
Best Electronic Track:Concord Dawn (featuring State of Mind) "Aces High"
Best Video: ShineStrength for The Sneaks "Kuzai Heart U Girl"
Best Live Act: Shapeshifter
Best Cover Design: Ruban Nielson for The Mint Chicks Crazy? Yes! Dumb? No!
Best Vocalist: Hollie Smith
Best Producer: Chris, Kody and Ruban Nielson for The Mint Chicks Crazy? Yes! Dumb? No!
Breakthrough Artist of the Year: State of Mind
Song of the Year: Shapeshifter "Bring Change"
Artist of the Year: The Mint Chicks
Album of the Year: Shapeshifter Soulstice
Outstanding Achievement of the Year: Fat Freddy's Drop (European Tour & 7× platinum NZ sales)

== 2007 bNet NZ Music Awards ==
The 2007 Awards were held on Friday 16 November 2007 at the Hopetoun Alpha venue in Auckland. The event was presented by Matt Heath and Chris Stapp. The presentation celebrated the 10th year of the awards but it was also to be the final bNet awards.

Winners

Downbeat/Dub Track of 2007: Little Bushman "Where We Get Born"
Hip-Hop Track of 2007: Coco Solid "Crime Fighters"
Pop Track of 2007: Liam Finn "Second Chance"
Rock Track of 2007: Die! Die! Die! "155"
Electronic Track of 2007: Pig Out "Disco Bag"
Best Video of 2007: The Mint Chicks "Walking off a Cliff Again"
Best Live Act of 2007: Shapeshifter
Best Cover Design: So So Modern "Friendly Fires"
Best Vocalist: Hollie Smith
Breakthrough Artist of 2007: Collapsing Cities
Radio One Song of the Year: David Kilgour "BBC World"
RDU Song of the Year: Bachelorette "Intergalactic Solitude"
Radio Active Song of the Year: So So Modern "Synthgasm"
Radio Control Song of the Year: Us As Robots "Strike a Pose"
The Most FM Song of the Year: Billy Reuben and Cursor "Safe As Houses"
95bFM Song of the Year: Liam Finn "Second Chance"
Artist of the Year: Liam Finn
Album of the Year: Liam Finn I'll Be Lightning
Best Producer: Sean Donnelly – SJD
Outstanding Achievement of 2007 Award: The Brunettes – signed to Sub Pop / based in USA
