= Rhian Sheehan =

New Zealand composer

Rhian Sheehan is a New Zealand composer and music producer born in Nelson and based in Wellington. He is known for his fusing of orchestral chamber music with ambient electronic and post-rock cinematic atmospheres. He has also written music for film, television, video games, exhibitions, advertisements, roller coaster rides, and planetarium dome shows.

== Career ==
Sheehan released his debut album Paradigm Shift in 2001. The record was issued in the UK almost two years later in 2003, and received praise from music critics. In 2004, Britain's Future Music Magazine named Sheehan as "The Next Big Thing" in ambient music. His 2009 album Standing in Silence, 2013's Stories from Elsewhere, and 2018's A Quiet Divide step away from his earlier electronica work into more of a shoegaze, post-rock, ambient, chamber music direction. Eminent US reviewer John Diliberto (host of Echoes) called Stories from Elsewhere "a modern ambient chamber music masterpiece of quietly epic dimensions".

Sheehan's work has featured on a variety of compilations, most notably the multi-platinum selling Cafe del Mar anthologies (vol. 10 and 11). His music has been heard on BBC's Top Gear as well as the Discovery Channel, the National Geographic channel, Netflix, and the HBO series Silicon Valley. His compositions have also been used in a variety of advertisements, including for such companies as Google, Facebook, Nike, and GoPro. In 2009, Sheehan composed the soundtrack to the British National Space Centre's We Are Astronomers, a 360° fulldome film (narrated by David Tennant). The same year, the artist wrote the score to the 13-part prime-time TV drama series The Cult (for which he was awarded a Qantas Film & TV Award for best original score), and the Emmy Award-winning web series Reservoir Hill. In 2012, Sheehan penned the score to the UK 3D planetarium documentary film We Are Aliens (narrated by Rupert Grint).

In July 2012, Japan's Preco Records released Sheehan's most recent albums Standing in Silence and Seven Tales of The North Wind together as a limited-edition double box set that included a remix of the track "Borrowing the Past" by American post-rock ambient group Hammock.

In March 2013, American label Darla Records released Stories from Elsewhere. The album was also released in Japan by Preco Records, and in New Zealand and Australia by LOOP Recordings. In October 2013, Sheehan completed writing the soundtrack to the US and UK-produced fulldome film Back to the Moon for Good. Commissioned by X Prize, the film is narrated by Tim Allen. The 25-minute digital production highlights the history of Moon exploration and provides an insider's look at the teams vying for the $30 million Google Lunar X Prize. The film was produced by the British National Space Centre, the X Prize Foundation, and Robert K. Weiss. The show is one of the most popular planetarium shows ever made, having screened in over 450 venues across the world.

In 2014, Sheehan contributed string arrangements for Jakob's album Sines. The record won the Taite Music Prize in 2015. In July 2015, Sheehan wrote and produced the orchestral soundtrack for the British 3D planetarium fulldome film We Are Stars (narrated by Andy Serkis), for which he was awarded "Best Soundtrack" at The 2015 Fiske Fulldome Film Festival. In August 2015, the artist released his first live album, Rhian Sheehan - Live at The Wellington Opera House. In December 2016, he scored the soundtrack for Weta Workshop's new Dr. Grordbort's exhibition.

The 2017 debut album SweetSexySavage by American R&B artist Kehlani features a sample of the Rhian Sheehan track "Waiting". The sample is used as the backbone to the track "Not Used to It".

In October 2018, Sheehan wrote the music for Magic Leap and Weta Workshop's 3D mixed-reality game Dr. Grordbort's Invaders.

On 12 October 2018, Loop Recordings & Kobalt Music released Sheehan's album A Quiet Divide. The album reached no.2 on the NZ Top 20.

In September 2019, Sheehan travelled to New York with artist Joseph Michael to collaborate on a large-scale audio-visual installation projected on the United Nations building. The installation ran for three nights, leading up to the UN Climate Action Summit. The art piece featured an original score by Sheehan and music by Brian Eno, and included the voices of six young climate change activists.

In January 2022, Sheehan composed the orchestral score for the roller coaster ride "Mission Ferrari" at Ferrari World, in Abu Dhabi, and the score for the location-based Mars ride experience "Tetrastar Spaceport" at the British National Space Centre

In September 2025, Sheehan released his first fully collaborative album, Traces, with composer and guitarist Arli Liberman. Released on Loop Recordings, it debuted at No. 8 on New Zealand's top 20 album chart, peaking at No. 2, and it reached No. 1 on the Independent New Zealand Album Charts.

== Personal life ==
Sheehan is the nephew of New Zealand photographer Laurence Aberhart and the son of travel and landscape photographer/publisher Grant Sheehan.

He is married to musician Raashi Malik.

Sheehan appears in James Cameron's films Avatar and Avatar: The Way of Water as a military engineer. The scene was filmed in Miramar, Wellington, in the same suburb where Rhian lives. Sheehan also wrote the trailer music featured in Cameron's 4K theatrical re-release of The Abyss.

== Discography ==
=== Studio albums ===
- Paradigm Shift (2001)
- Tiny Blue Biosphere (2004)
- Music for Nature Documentaries – remix album (2004)
- New Zealand Landscapes – Book/CD (2008)
- Standing in Silence (2008)
- Stories from Elsewhere (2013)
- Live at The Wellington Opera House (2015)
- A Quiet Divide (2018)
- Recollections, Vol. 1 (2020)
- Recollections, Vol. 2 (2020)
- Traces with Arli Liberman (2025)

=== EPs ===
- Seven Tales of the North Wind (2011)
- Velvet Ears Presents: Rhian Sheehan (2024)

=== Scores ===
- We Are Stars - Original Score (2015)
- Belief: The Possession of Janet Moses - Original Score (2017)
- Capcom Go! The Apollo Story - Original Score (2019)

=== Compilation appearances ===
- Café del Mar Vol.10 (Spain)
- Café del Mar Vol.11 (Spain)
- Barramundi, Vol. 4: Together (France)
- Pacific Hotel (France)
- The Sound of Dub (Germany)
- Turtle Bay Country Club presents – Love Factory (Germany)
- LOOP Select 05 (Australia)
- Love Parade (Germany)
- Trance Forward (UK)
- Zen 4 (AUS)
- Lazy Sunday Vol 5 (NZ)
- LOOP Select 01 (NZ)
- Radio Active 25 Silver Selections (NZ)
- Alpine Unity – Passenger (NZ)
- The Telecom CD (NZ)
- LOOP Select 03 (NZ)
- LOOP Select 06 (NZ)
- Green Room 4 – Hope (NZ)
- Various – Nuclear Free Nation (NZ)
- Eco Zen 2 – VA (Aus)
- Bridging The Pacific Vol 1 – VA (AUS)
- Festivus – VA (AUS)
- Silent Ballet – Volume XI: Wenn ich ein Eisbär wäre (US)
- LOOP Select – KONO 02 (NZ)
- For Nihon (US) – V/A
- Disquiet Vol.2 (US) – V/A
- Ministry of Sound Hed Kandi: Winter Chill – V/A (UK)
- Little Darla Has a Treat for You, Vol. 28 – V/A (US)
- A Strangely Isolated Place – Full Circle – V/A (US)
- For Ukraine (Volume 2) – V/A (US)
- For LA (Volume 1) – V/A (US)

=== Album appearances ===
- The Black Seeds – Pushed (2002)
- The Nomad – Step 4th (2003)
- Module – Remarkable Engines (2006)
- Antix – Twin Coast Discovery (2005)
- Antix – Twin Coast Discovery Remixes (2006)
- Richard Nunns and Hirini Melbourne – Te Ku Te Whe Remixed (2006)
- Rhombus – Onwards (Remixes and Archives) (2008)
- Rosy Tin Teacaddy – The Homeward Stretch (2009)
- Raashi Malik – Raashi Malik EP (2010)
- The Blush Response – Love Electric (2011)
- Helios – Remixed (2012)
- Hammock – EPs, Singles and Remixes (2013)
- Jakob – Sines (2014)
- Applescal – For (2015)
- Thomas Oliver – Floating in the Darkness (2017)
- Kehlani – SweetSexySavage (2017)

== Score and soundtrack credits ==
- The Sunshine Man – short film (NZ, 2005)
- Welcome home – short film (NZ, 2006)
- Huloo – documentary (NZ, 2008)
- The Cult – TV series (2009)
- We Are Astronomers – planetarium dome film (UK, 2009)
- Reservoir Hill – series 1 (2009)
- Reservoir Hill – series 2 (2010)
- Top Gear – Great Adventures 3 (UK, 2010)
- Journey of Contrasts – 3D planetarium dome film (UK, 2010)
- Day Trip – short film (NZ, 2010)
- The Banker, the Escorts and the $18 Million – documentary (NZ, 2011)
- In Safe Hands – short film (NZ, 2011)
- Abiogenesis – short film (NZ, 2011)
- Geoff Duke – In Pursuit of Perfection – documentary (UK, 2012)
- Cell, Cell, Cell – 3D planetarium dome film (UK, 2012)
- Siege (NZ, 2012)
- We Are Aliens – 3D planetarium dome film (UK, 2012)
- Back to the Moon for Good – planetarium dome film (US, 2013)
- Holding the Sun – short film (NZ, 2013)
- Naked Castaway – the Discovery Channel (US, 2013)
- Similo – short film (Spain, 2014)
- America's Got Talent (US, 2014)
- Dinner with Friends with Brett Gelman and Friends – Adult Swim special (US, 2014)
- Los Angeles 1991 – short film (US, 2015)
- The Day That Changed My Life – documentary (NZ, 2015)
- Belief: The Possession of Janet Moses – feature documentary (NZ, 2015)
- We Are Stars – 3D planetarium dome film (UK, 2015)
- The World in Your Window – short film (NZ, 2016)
- The Mauritania Railway – Backbone of the Sahara – documentary (US, 2017)
- Dr. Grordbort's Invaders – Magic Leap mixed-reality game (US, 2018)
- Queer Eye – Netflix series (US, 2019)
- CapCom Go! The Apollo Story – 3D planetarium dome show (UK, 2019)
- The Sounds – TV series (UK/CAN, 2020)
- Formula 1: Drive to Survive – Netflix series (US, 2020)
- Rise and Fall: The World Trade Center – documentary (US, 2021)
- Upload – Prime series (US, 2022)
- Cunk on Earth – Netflix series (UK, 2022)
- The American Presidency – series (US, 2022)
- Spiderhead – trailer music (US, 2022)
- The US Super Bowl LVI (US, 2022)
- Janet Jackson Lifetime – series (US, 2022)
- We Are Guardians – 3D planetarium dome film (UK, 2022)
- The Abyss Special Edition – trailer music (2023)
- A Thousand Suns – series (US 2024)
- The Great Solar System Adventure – 3D planetarium film (UK, 2024)
- One Step Beyond: A Journey to Mars – 3D planetarium film (UK, 2025)

== Awards and nominations ==
- Finalist "Best Electronica Album" at the New Zealand Music Awards (2002)
- Finalist "Best Electronica Album" at the bNet New Zealand Music Awards (2002)
- Winner "Best Video" Handle the Jandal Music Video Awards for "Waiting" (2002)
- Runner-up "Best Video" Handle the Jandal Music Video Awards for "An Afternoon on the Moon" (2003)
- Winner "Best Animated Video" Young Guns International Video Awards (2004)
- Finalist "Most Outstanding Musician" at the bNet New Zealand Music Awards (2005)
- Finalist "Best Electronic Album" at the bNet New Zealand Music Awards (2005)
- Finalist "Best Animated Video" Animate Festival 2009 official selection (Director) for "Standing in Silence Pt3" (2009)
- Finalist "Best Live Performance" Wellingtonista Awards (2009)
- Winner "Best Original Score" Qantas Film and Television Awards (2010)
- Winner "Best Soundtrack" Fiske Fulldome Film Festival (2015)
- Finalist "Best Score" Revolution Me Film Festival (New York) for Los Angeles 1991 (2016)
- Winner "Best Soundtrack" Festival de Cortometrajes de Requena (Spain) for The Mauritania Railway: Backbone of the Sahara (2018)
- Finalist "Best Trailer Music" Music & Sound Awards for "Harajuku" (2019)
- Winner "Best Composer" American Golden Picture International Film Festival for CAPCOM GO! The Apollo Story (2019)
- Winner "Best Score" Top Shorts Film Festival for CAPCOM GO! The Apollo Story (2019)
- Winner "Honourable Mention (Best Score)" Los Angeles Film Awards for CAPCOM GO! The Apollo Story (2020)
- Winner "Best Original Score" New York Film Awards for CAPCOM GO! The Apollo Story (2020)
- Finalist "Best Original Score " NZTV Awards for The Sounds (2021)
- Finalist "Best Original Score " APRA Screen Awards for The Sounds (2021)
- Finalist "Best Original Score (Exhibitions, Theme Parks, Special Projects)" Hollywood Music in Media Awards for One Step Beyond: A Journey to Mars (2025)
