= 100.4 FM =

FM radio frequency

This is a list of radio stations that broadcast on FM frequency 100.4 MHz:

== Albania ==
- Club FM, Tirana, a radio station based in Tirana, Albania

== Belarus ==
- Hit FM

== China ==
- CNR China Traffic Radio in Hefei

== Colombia ==
- HJL81 Los 40 in Bogotá

== France ==
- France Bleu, the regional radio network of Radio France

== Germany ==
- WDR 2 a radio network produced by the Westdeutscher Rundfunk public broadcasting organization in Germany

== India ==
- India Radio, the radio broadcaster of India and a division of Prasar Bharati

== Italy ==
- Radio Sole, an Independent Local Radio station based in Galatina (Lecce), Southern Italy

== Lithuania ==
- Vakarų FM

== Malaysia ==
- Molek FM in Kuantan, Pahang (formerly operated by 8FM)
- Ai FM in Malacca and Northern Johor

== Morocco ==
- Aswat Radio in Agadir

== Netherlands ==
- Q-music

== New Zealand ==
- The Most FM

== Russia ==
- Nashe Radio, a rock music station designed to promote Russian rock bands (as opposed to pop and Western music)

== South Africa ==
- Radio 786, a community radio station based in Cape Town, South Africa

== Sri Lanka ==
- E FM, a Colombo, Sri Lanka–based radio station, playing '80s music

== United Kingdom ==
- Classic FM, an Independent National Radio station broadcasting popular classical music, on this frequency serving Herefordshire, Milton Keynes and parts of Gloucestershire
- KMFM Medway, an Independent Local Radio serving the Medway Towns, Southend and the surrounding areas in Kent
- Smooth North West in North West England

== Vietnam ==
- Soc Trang Radio, a community radio and television station based in Soc Trang, Vietnam (Currently relaying Can Tho Radio broadcasts on FM 97.3 MHz.)
