= Futureproof =

Futureproof may refer to:

- Future proof, the process of anticipating future developments and events in the development of a product or system
- Futureproof (album), a 1999 album by Pitch Black
- Futureproof (novel), a 2006 novel by N. Frank Daniels
- Futureproof: 9 Rules in the Age of Automation, a 2021 book by Kevin Roose
- Futureproof (band), an act from the fourth series of The X Factor
- "Futureproof", a 2021 song by Nothing but Thieves
