= 2017 New Zealand Music Awards =

Annual New Zealand music awards ceremony

- Awarded for: Excellence in New Zealand music
- Sponsored by: Vodafone
- Date: 16 November 2017
- Location: Spark Arena
- Country: New Zealand
- Reward: Tui award trophy
- Website: http://www.nzmusicawards.co.nz

Television/radio coverage
- Network: Three

The 2017 New Zealand Music Awards was the 51st holding of the annual ceremony featuring awards for musical recording artists based in or originating from New Zealand. It took place on 16 November 2017 at Spark Arena in Auckland and it was hosted by Jono Pryor and Ben Boyce. The awards show was broadcast live nationally on Three.

Nominations for the 2017 New Zealand Music Awards opened on 21 June 2017, and covered artists that released commercial recordings between 1 August 2016 and 31 July 2017. Nominations closed on 2 August 2017, and the nominees were announced on 5 October. The artisan award winners were awarded on 25 October 2017.

== Early awards ==
While most of the awards were presented at the main November ceremony, five genre awards were presented earlier in the year at ceremonies of their field.

- The first was awarded in January, with the Tui for Best Folk Album presented at the Auckland Folk Festival in Kumeu to Kumeu local Guy Wishart for his album West By North.
- In March, the Best Children's Music Album was presented to Anika Moa for her album Songs for Bubbas 2. For 2017, the presentation was moved to March, as part of Children's Day celebrations.
- The Best Country Music Album Tui was presented in June at the New Zealand Country Music Awards in Gore to Jody Direen for her album Shake Up.
- The Tui for Best Pacific Music Album was presented in June at the Vodafone Pacific Music Awards to Aaradhna for her album Brown Girl.
- Also in June, the Tui for Best Jazz Album was presented at the Wellington Jazz Festival to Jonathan Crayford for his recording East West Moon. The award is now part of the Wellington Jazz Festival.

== Nominees and winners ==
A number of changes were made to the award categories for 2017:

- The Best Male Solo Artist and Best Female Solo Artist were amalgamated into Best Solo Artist.
- Following the 2016 controversy, the Best Urban/Hip Hop Album was split into two awards: Best Hip Hop Artist and Best Soul/RnB Artist.
- The Critic's Choice Award was not be presented in 2017, with a plan to reevaluate the award.
- The genre awards are no longer tied to a specific album, in order to reflect the move away from albums in the current recorded music climate. The awards now focus on the artist, with the eligibility changed to "an album OR a minimum of five single tracks".

Winners are listed first and highlighted in boldface.

Key
‡ – Artisan award

Album of the Year	Single of the Year
Sponsored by Godfrey Hirst: **Lorde – Melodrama**; Aldous Harding – Party; David Dallas – Hood Country Club; Fazerdaze – Morningside; Leisure – LEISURE; SWIDT – Stoneyhunga	Sponsored by Vodafone: **Lorde – "Green Light"**; David Dallas – "Fit In"; Ladi6 – "Royal Blue"; MAALA – "In My Head"; SWIDT – "Player of the Day"; Theia – "Roam"
Best Group	Breakthrough Artist of the Year
**SWIDT**; Devilskin; Leisure; Shapeshifter	**Aldous Harding**; Fazerdaze; Nadia Reid; Teeks
Best Solo Artist	Best Hip Hop Artist
Sponsored by Three: **Lorde**; Aldous Harding; Kings; Nadia Reid	**SWIDT**; David Dallas; KINGS
Best Rock Artist	Best Pop Artist
**Devilskin**; Clap Clap Riot; Graham Brazier	Sponsored by The Edge: **Lorde**; Mitch James; Theia
Best Soul/RnB Artist	Best Roots Artist
**Ladi6**; Teeks; Tommy Nee	**Israel Starr**; Sons of Zion; Tomorrow People
Best Alternative Artist	Best Māori Artist
**Aldous Harding**; Fazerdaze; Nadia Reid	Sponsored by Te Māngai Pāho: **Teeks**; Alien Weaponry; Maisey Rika
Best Worship Artist	Best Classical Artist
**Curate Music**; Josh & Amberley Klinkenberg; Juliagrace	**NZTrio**; Jenny McLeod; Te Kōkī Trio
Best Electronic Artist	Legacy Award
**Truth**; Chaos in the CBD; K+Lab	Sponsored by The New Zealand Herald; No finalists are announced in this category.: **Sharon O'Neill**
People's Choice Award	
Sponsored by Vodafone: **Lorde**; Kings; Maala; SWIDT; Theia	
Highest selling New Zealand Single	Highest selling New Zealand Album
Sponsored by Vodafone No finalists are announced in this category.: **Kings - "Don't Worry 'Bout It"**	No finalists are announced in this category.: **The Koi Boys - Meant To Be**
Radio Airplay Record of the Year	International Achievement Award
Sponsored by NZ On Air No finalists are announced in this category.: **Kings - "Don't Worry 'Bout It"**	No finalists are announced in this category.: **Opetaia Foa'i**; **Lorde**
Best Music Video‡	Best Album Cover‡
Sponsored by NZ On Air Presented 25 October 2017: Dan Watkins (Reel Factory) – "Her" (Shapeshifter); Joel Kefali – "Got It Bad" (Leisure); Sam Kristofski – "Lucky Girl" (Fazerdaze)	Presented 25 October 2017: Dean Poole & Tyrone Ohia (Alt Group) – Stars (Shapeshifter); Henrietta Harris – Otherness (Grayson Gilmour); Jamie Robertson – String Theory (Fly My Pretties)
Best Engineer‡	Best Producer‡
Presented 25 October 2017: Ben Edwards – Preservation (Nadia Reid); Chris Chetland – A Place to Stand (REI); Clint Murphy – Be Like The River (Devilskin)	Sponsored by Massey University Presented 25 October 2017: Ben Edwards – Preservation (Nadia Reid); Leisure – LEISURE (Leisure); SmokeyGotBeatz – Stoneyhunga (SWIDT)
Best Folk Album	Best Children's Music Album
Presented 29 January 2017: **Guy Wishart – West By North**; Graeme James – News From Nowhere; Luke Thompson – Hosts	Presented 5 March 2017: **Anika Moa – Songs for Bubbas 2**; Claudia Gunn – Little Wild Lullabies; Itty Bitty Beats – On the Move
Best Country Music Album	Best Pacific Music Album
Presented 1 June 2017: **Jody Direen – Shake Up**; Hamilton County Bluegrass Band – These Old Hands; Phil Doublet – Endless Highway	Presented 1 June 2017: **Aaradhna – Brown Girl**; Kings – Kings EP; Unity Pacific – Blackbirder Dread
Best Jazz Album	
Presented 11 June 2017: **Jonathan Crayford – East West Moon**; Mike Nock Trio & NZ Trio – Vicissitudes; Myele Manzanza – OnePointOne	
