= Chaos by Design =

Studio album by Concord Dawn
- Released: (New Zealand) 14 August 2006
- Genre: Drum and bass
- Label: Uprising Records
- Producer: Concord Dawn

Concord Dawn chronology
Uprising (2004)	Chaos by Design (2006)	The Enemy Within (2010)

Chaos by Design is an album by the New Zealand drum and bass group Concord Dawn, released in 2006. It features tracks with Tiki of Salmonella Dub and Wellington soul singer Hollie Smith.

== Track listing ==
1. "Broken Eyes"
2. "Chloroform"
3. "One Night In Reno" featuring Devin Abrams
4. "Man For All Seasons" featuring Paul McLaney
5. "Lost At Sea"
6. "Aces High" featuring State of Mind
7. "Fly Away Home"
8. "Blow"
9. "Never Give Up On Love" featuring Tiki Taane
10. "You Don't Have To Run"
11. "Say Your Words" featuring Hollie Smith
