= Stomach (disambiguation) =

A stomach is an organ found in animals.

Stomach may also refer to:

- Abdomen, in colloquial use
- Stomach (Chinese constellation)
- Stomach (Chinese medicine)
- The Stomach, a 2014 British short horror film by Ben Steiner
- The Stomach, a music venue, rehearsal space, and studio in New Zealand
