= RDU =

RDU may refer to:

- Raleigh–Durham International Airport's IATA code
- The Raleigh–Durham area
- RDU-FM, a New Zealand radio station
- Red Dot United, a political party in Singapore
- WTKK, a radio station licensed at the time to Wilson, North Carolina, which called itself "106.1 RDU"
