= Bass Player =

A bass player is a musician who plays a bass instrument such as bass guitar, double bass, or keyboard bass.

Bass Player may refer to:

- Bass Player (magazine), a magazine for bassists
- Bass Player (album), a 2003 album by Rhombus
- T. B. Player, short for "the Bass Player", an unnamed character in the film That Thing You Do!
