= Jakob (band) =

New Zealand post-rock band

- Origin: Napier, New Zealand
- Genres: Post-rock, Post-metal
- Years active: 1998–present
- Label: The Mylene Sheath
- Spinoffs: Desbot, Without Borders, Mean
- Members: Jeff Boyle; Maurice Beckett; Jason Johnston
- Website: jakob.co.nz

Jakob is a New Zealand post-rock band, based in the Hawkes Bay city of Napier. The band consists of guitarist Jeff Boyle, bassist Maurice Beckett, and drummer Jason Johnston. They have been compared to such bands as Mogwai, Sonic Youth, and High Dependency Unit, though they largely eschew any vocals or samples in their songs.

== History ==
The band formed in July 1998, and began by opening for New Zealand bands Salmonella Dub and Pitch Black at the local pub O'Flaherty's. They toured extensively throughout 1999, releasing that same year a self-titled EP recorded with David Holmes at Napier's Venn Production Studios. The year 2000 brought a gig at The Event New Years party in Napier, and the 7" single Erfo, a limited release on the Crawlspace Records label.

Jakob returned to Venn Studios in March 2001 to record their debut album with engineer David Holmes (also known from the band Kerretta). Subsets of Sets was released April 2002 through New Zealand's Midium Records to good reviews and a nomination at the bNet independent music awards. Jakob continued touring with artists such as HDU and fellow Midium artists Avotor and Meterman, as well as playing at the 2002 Big Day Out.

A period of inactivity followed, lasting between six and eight months. The band didn't play together during that time, and for two months didn't even see each other. They regrouped in January 2003 with ideas for new songs, and spent a week at The Church studio with David Holmes. This session was ultimately scrapped, but after more rehearsal final versions of the songs were recorded over two days in March. Cale:Drew, their second full-length album, was released in August 2003 and garnered Jakob another bNet nomination.

International touring followed in 2004, to Chicago (where they played at studio radio station WXRT), Denmark, and the United Kingdom. They were well received at every venue, and released a 7" single, Semaphore, in Europe. Also that year, they released the one-track mini-album Dominion, and played a 25-minute set at Radio New Zealand's Helen Young Studios (consisting of the songs Laburnum, Semaphore, Nice Day for an Earthquake, and Jimmy Hoffa).

2005 saw more international touring by Jakob, with the band playing at South by Southwest in March, and Australia in September (in support of the release of Cale:Drew there) and again in late October (with Australian band Cog). It also saw the release of their Diffusion 7" and Coalescence, a 12" compilation from Midium Records, featuring a track by Jakob.

Jakob played concerts all through New Zealand in August 2006 as part of the A Low Hum tour, and released their third album Solace in September 2006.

In April 2008 Jakob toured Europe with Isis and The Austerity Program, and Australia with Cog. They also completed a US tour in the second half of 2008, once again with ISIS.

During 2008 and 2009 members Jeff Boyle and Maurice Beckett worked on other projects. Maurice with his solo project Desbot, and Jeff with a project entitled Mean with H. Walker from Avotor and Kerretta. The debut Mean LP entitled "Knowing" was released in December 2012.

In March 2010, Jakob announced a four-date April tour of NZ, heading in May and June to the US West Coast to support Isis' tour once again.

In January 2011, they supported Tool on their Australian tour.

On 29 April 2013, it was announced via the band's Facebook page that they were to join Tool again as support act for their Vector Arena shows.

In October 2013, Jakob featured on the soundtrack for the surf documentary Waverider by Gareth Davies and RedYeti Films, directed by Karl Lear, winner of Best Picture (2013) in New Zealand and Best Picture (2014) in Hawaii.

In January 2015, they played at St Jerome's Laneway Festival in Auckland. They also went on to support Royal Blood at the Wellington Laneway sideshow.

On 15 October 2022, bassist Maurice Beckett announced via Jakob's Facebook page that they would be heading into the studio to record a yet unnamed sixth album, beginning in January 2023.

== Discography ==
=== Albums ===
- Jakob (1999)
- Subsets of Sets (2001)
- Cale:Drew (2003)
- Solace (2006)
- Sines (2014)

=== EPs ===
- Dominion^{1} (2004)

=== Featured ===
- "Method", track on Coalescence compilation (2005)
- "Semaphore (demo)" and "Pneumonic (Avotor remix)", tracks on A Flip and Two Twisters compilation (2007)
- "Oran Mor (remix)" Remix and reworked by Klute and features on the limited to 300 copies 12" vinyl Effectuation compilation (2008)

=== Singles ===
- "Erfo²" (2000)
- "Drive Here and Then" (2001)
- "I'm on Your Side" (2001)
- "Nice Day For an Earthquake" (2001)
- "A Moment From Different Angles" (2001)
- "I was Hidden" (2003)
- "Semaphore" (2004)
- "The Diffusion of Our Inherent Situation" (2005)
- "Malachite" (2006)
- "Pneumonic" (2006)
- "Blind Them with Science" (2014)

¹limited to 1000 hand-numbered copies
²limited edition of 200 copies

== Awards ==
Jakob have been nominated for a number of New Zealand awards:

bNet Awards (Independent)

- 2001 – Best New Artist, Best Rock Album, Best Live Act
- 2002 – Best Album, for Subsets of Sets; Best Rock/Pop Release; Best Independent Release; Best New Act
- 2004 – Best Rock Release, for Cale:Drew
- 2005 – Best Live Act

Jakob played live at the 2001 bNet Awards.
