= Feel the Seasons Change – Live with the NZSO =

Feel the Seasons Change - Live with the NZSO

Live album by Salmonella Dub
- Released: September 22, 2008
- Recorded: February 1, 2008 at Aotea Centre, Auckland; February 8, 2008 at Christchurch Town Hall, Christchurch
- Genre: Dub, orchestral
- Length: 64:55
- Label: Virgin Records
- Producer: Andre Upston and Ian McAllister

Salmonella Dub chronology
Heal Me (2007)	Feel the Seasons Change - Live with the NZSO (2008)	Freak Local (2009)

Feel the Seasons Change – Live with the NZSO is the first live album released by the New Zealand dub band Salmonella Dub. The album was recorded live with the New Zealand Symphony Orchestra (NZSO) during their 'Feel The Seasons Change' tour and also included special guests such as Whirimako Black, Richard Nunns and Paddy Free. The tour had four shows around New Zealand, in Auckland, Wellington, Christchurch and Nelson; but the live album only took songs from the Auckland and Christchurch performances.

Also released at the same time was a limited collector's edition of the Feel the Seasons change album, which included a bonus DVD featuring a slideshow of background images put on the big screen at their shows (playing to the song Tui Dub), and a slideshow of photos taken of their shows (playing to the song For The Love Of It).

== Track listing ==
1. "Weherua Pō" — 1:53
2. "First Light" — 1:32
3. "Tui Dub" — 6:10
4. "Love, Sunshine and Happiness" — 6:24
5. "Tētēkura" — 1:49
6. "Watching It Rain" — 5:45
7. "Karekare" — 2:19
8. "Drifting" — 7:25
9. "Heal Me" — 4:19
10. "Heal Me Coda" — 2:09
11. "Lightning" — 5:24
12. "Feel the Seasons Change" — 6:49
13. "Aniwaniwa" — 1:29
14. "Gifts" — 5:12
15. "Platetectonics (Fartyboom) — 6:16
