= Swampfest =

New Zealand annual musical festival

Coordinates: 40°21.3′S 175°36.7′E

The logo for the 2006 Swampfest

Swampfest is an annual musical festival that showcases Palmerston North bands. Swampfest was originally timed to coincide with New Zealand Music Month (May), but in 2009 switched to September to match the 21st birthday of The Stomach's, which is a music performing and rehearsal space in the city. Swampfest showcases local up-and-coming and established artists who play original music. The genre of music played at the festival varies depending on the artists, but Rock, punk, ska, electronic, hip hop, metal, pop, solo and acoustic have all featured in the festival.

The festival is named after Palmerston North's primordial origins as a swamp.

== Location ==
Swampfest in 2004 and 2005 were held at The Guv'nors Tavern. Swampfest in 2006 and 2007 was held at The Globe Theatre, Palmerston North. There was no Swampfest in 2008 due to the Stomach building being refurbished. Swampfest 2009 was held at the Stomach. Due to a cut in operating funding, there was no Swampfest in 2010. Swampfest'11 was held at The Stomach, The Regent Theatre, JBHiFi, and alternative venues. Swampfest 2012 was held at The Regent Theatre, The Stomach, The Royal and other locations. Swampfest 2013 was held at The Regent Theatre, The Stomach, The Dark Room and The Square.

== Organisation ==
Creative Sounds and the staff of The Stomach are the main co-ordinators behind the event. The festival is occasionally supported by Radio Control 99.4FM, the Massey University campus radio.

== History ==
Local musician Murray Shaw (Turbostill/Bloodspray for Politics/Neckstretchers/Hellborne/Slave Collective-www.slave.co.nz) came up with the original name and concept (numerous local/original bands playing over multiple nights) for SwampFest. He decided not to pursue it, and two other local musicians, Craig Black and Hayden Sinclair oversaw the first two events.

Swampfest began in 2004 with 8 bands over two nights. This was held at The Guv'nors Tavern. Following the success of the first event, Swampfest'05 featured 12 bands over three nights.

To allow Swampfest to grow and involve more artists (and to take the financial burden off Black and Sinclair), from 2006 the event has been c-ordinated by Creative Sounds/The Stomach. The 2006/7 Swampfests were held at the Globe Theatre to allow for an All Ages audience in keeping with the objectives of Creative Sounds. Due to the complete refurbishment of The Stomach in 2008, staff were unable to co-ordinate a Swampfest that year. 2009 was the 21st year of operation for the Stomach, the birthday celebration was combined with Swampfest. Due to a funding cut, leading to staff redundancy, The Stomach was unable to co-ordinate a Swampfest that year.

The Stomach was able to relaunch Swampfest in 2011, due to funding gained from the Rugby World Cup regional events fund, administered by the Our People Our Place Trust.

The 2005/6/7 Swampfests were filmed and two songs from each performing band were placed on a limited edition DVD. The four shows hosted at The Stomach of Swampfest'11, were webcast live.

Previous to Swampfest, Palmerston North music was celebrated with various incarnations of an annual music events, ranging from The Intergalactic Balls of the early 1990s, and various multimedia events culminated in the 1997 The Restless Festival of Youth which secured funding to run a variety of local events at different venues. The annual Restless Festival showcasing local talent evolved each year, and became the first live gig at the restored Regent Theatre, 1999's Cerebral Cortex embraced 17 local acts performing on the same night.

== Lineups ==
Edition	Year	Dates	Acts	Venues
1	2004	~	7.62 Short, Collapse, Faker, Hellborne, Hoopla!, Reflector, Stitchface, Wall Of Silents	The Guv'nors Tavern
2	2005	~	*The Bing Turkby Ensemble, Black Chrome, Cathedra, Collapse, Dub Arkestra, Hellborne, Hoopla!, Impish, Reflector, Scourge Of Tussin, Stitchface, Velvetine Black, Missing Link	The Guv'nors Tavern
3	2006	~	Bing Turkby Ensemble, Black Chrome, Collapse, Emmilies Illusion, Grayson Gilmour, Hellborne, The Livids, Reflector, Stiletto, Stitchface, Twice Daily, Wall Of Silents	The Globe Theatre
4	2007	11–13 May	Bing Turkby Ensemble, Black Chrome, The B-Side Electro Funk Disaster, Cathedra, Cord Willis, The Godfrees, Hoopla!, Little Room, The Livids, The Particulars, Us As Robots, Wall Of Silents	The Globe Theatre
5	2009	~	Massacre the Weak, Ricky Bobby, Joe Hill, Scarkiss, Solfonic, Black Chrome, The Kleptics, The Nerines, National Office, David Stevens, The Excludents, Haluciagea, Nutella Monk, Bing Turkby Ensemble, The Postures, Ruski, Us As Robots	The Stomach
6	2011	~	nutellamonk, HUF, researchintospeed, The Drugs, -52, Highfield Weekend, Us As Robots, Fowl Friends, Brooklyn State Hospital, The Bing Turkby Ensemble, Thief, Robin, Cephalopod, Losses, Discorpse, Project Blood, Ricky Bobby, iRyoko, Outside the Beat, Stanley Pedigree, Dirtbox Charlie, Grayson Gilmour, The Nerines, Jemmamarie, Amelia Shadbolt, Te Ra Moriarty	The Stomach, The Regent Theatre, JBHiFi, others
7	2012	1 - 29 September	nutellamonk, Busta Dimes, Given Names, researchintospeed, Alpha Beta Gamma, iRyoko, Grysn Glmr, The Methadonnas, Mountain Eater, Pom Pom, -52, The Bing Turkby Ensemble, Black Chrome, The Impediments, Reclusia, Dirtbox Charlie, Amphora, Bloodspray for Politics, Cephalopod, Nausea, Project Blood, Diamond Sutra, BottleKids, Beneath The Heavens, Black Wings, Forsaken, huf, Stanley Pedigree, Abi Symes, Benny Tipene, Hydro Raspberry, Kelsey Lawn, The Nerines, Robin	The Regent Theatre, The Stomach, The Royal, others
8	2013	1 - 27 September	Abi Symes, Amelia & the Other Stuff, Bridget and Dylan, Sam Morgan, Shayla, Te Ra Moriarty and Tim Jurgens, Benny Tipene, Dick Tracy, The Jefferys, The Nerines, Beneath the Heavens, Carrion, Cats Eat Dogs, Gains, Valerie Solanas, Hot Property, Indecisive, Man in Rug, No Shells, 66Queens, Alpha Beta Gamma, Commander Dimes, Given Names, Journey of Chaos, DJ Samir, Rave Dobbyn, Big Friendlies	Regent Theatre, The Stomach, The Dark Room and The Square
9	2014	23 - 26 October	DJ Dee Steez & HUFF, Alpha Beta Gamma, Anna Madeleine, Big Friendlies, bBuska Dimes, Journey of Chaos, Man in Rug, Pixie Dust, P90s, Topaz rooster, Abi Symes, Alt Simulacra, Arcadian Kites, Gains, Given Names, No Shells, Slower Motion, SODA BOYZ, Fay Morris, Jakeland, JemmaMarie, Risky Kittens	The Square, The Globe Theatre, Great Job, Village Inn Kitchen
10	2015	29 - 31 October	Benny Tipene, Jakeland, Foreshadows, Dentist Apprentice, Pixie Dust, PNC, Splitting Atoms, Stanley Pedigree, Mikey Dam, Buska Dimes	The Stomach
11	2016	19 - 23 October	1964, Acid Animals From Outerspace, Andy Anderson and Band, Churlington, Crackpot Theory, Diamond Sutra, Buska, DimesDimes, Foreshadows, fruit juice parade, Fusion NZ / Punk Rock Band., Goto, Jemma Marie, Kelsey Jo Music, Kokoa Nashi, Liam Cody, Miss, nerlin, Parafin, researchintospeed, Robin, Bing Turkby Ensemble, Tommy Deluge, Tū Tonu	The Fish Cocktail Bar, The Stomach, Snails: Artist Run Spaces, The Square
12	2017	5 - 21 October	Anandonion, Bearded Theory, Bing Turkby Ensemble, Black Chrome, Dusk Till Dawn, Felix & Jack, Fruit Juice Parade, Fusion, Ge0-citiez, Goto, Government Pest, Humming, Intellivisions, Jakeland, Jaywalker, Katie, Kokoa Nashi, Kolkhoz, Lewis Kingston, Miss, Realtors of Rave, Shannen, Soda Boyz, The Gorge, The Hellebores, Tū Tonu	The Stomach, Us Studio, Massey University Concourse, Square Edge, Halcyon Cafe on Cuba Street, The Square
12	2018	16 - 21 October	Alpha Beta Gamma, Asbestos Man, Bottlekids, Churlington, Defetus, Democracy Manifest, DEPARTMENT OF LABOUR, Distance, First Move, fruit juice parade, GeoCities, Goto, Government Pest, Heavy Blarney, KOLKHOZ, Ladders, Mirror Stage, Parafin, Ripple Effect, Robin, Skitz Hydro, SODA BOYZ, Sweater, Takaro Techno Club, The Makos	The Stomach, The Square, Snails: Artists Run Spaces, Cafe Royale / Square Edge
13	2019	11 - 19 October	researchintospeed, Asbestos Man$, hannengeorgiapetersen, Feildings Best Dancers, Strange Brew, Abi Symes-Edmonds, Amelia Shadbolt, Dave Boyack, Bambin, Marcus Hermit, Synthetic Children, ghost of ris, Distance, Felix, GeoCities, M.O.C, Department of Labour, Tim*J, Parafin, Kybele, Polaroids of Polarbears, fruit juice parade, The Wake Up, Government Pest, Focus, GeoCities, Rave Dobbyn, Tū	The Stomach, Snails: Artists Run Spaces,
17	2023	19–29 October	Sports Dreams, Bad Schematics, Bush Lawyer, Carb on Carb, Coffee Breaks, Dahlia, Daniel Foster, Epidemic, Fusion, Hine Raiona Bigbada Boom Sound System, Illusive, Khaki Department, Kokoa Nashi, Libby Offord, Lies and Lullabies, Lucid, Meanowls, Milo Lou, Molly Pawson, Nic Mason, Old Man Pine, Our Beloved Ditch, Persimmon, Philip Yeo, Renee Therese, Rusty Frame, Ruul 34, Showponi, Sports Dreams, Stellar Talauta, Swampwitch, Teams Meetings, The Fairlight Choir, WintyrQueen	The Stomach, Square Edge
20	2026	17 October	Noddy On The Cross, Cephalopod, Defeatus, Bolkidz, Fader, Resist, Riot, The Nerines, Planet Overload, Fusion, Studio One, Pining Radiata, Old Man Pin, Nutellamonk, Key Lime Pie, After Expiry, WaterColour, Persimmon, Carnage In The Cul-de-sac	The Stomach
