= Kerretta =

Kerretta is an experimental rock band from Auckland, New Zealand. The band consists of bass player William Waters; drummer H.Walker; and guitarist David Holmes. They have mostly recorded instrumentals.

== History ==
Kerretta formed in mid-2005, combining members of Avotor (H.Walker), Meterman (William Waters) and David Holmes who was producing records for the likes of Jakob, and An Emerald City . Their first release was in December 2007, with the release of the Death in the Future/Wisnierska on 7" through Midium Records after playing at various shows throughout New Zealand where an unexpected amount of enthusiasm from New Zealand college radio amounted from this first single.

In early 2008 they recorded a 4 track 12" entitled "Antient" with Dale Cotton in Port Chalmers, Dunedin and began supporting the likes of US artist's The Breeders, Trail Of Dead as well as invites to respected festivals such as Big Day Out. In 2009 they released their self-produced debut album, Vilayer, through German label Golden Antenna (home to Maserati), which it was nominated for the Taite Music Prize in 2010, the New Zealand's equivalent to the Mercury Prize, as well as supported Post Rock outfit from Japan Mono. In 2010 Kerretta toured North America, performing at South by Southwest in Austin, Texas, United States and alongside the likes of Pierced Arrows (members of Dead Moon), Lullabye Arkestra, and Narrows.

Kerretta completed the recording of their sophomore LP entitled "Saansilo" in March 2011 and this was released in September of the same year.

Between 2011 and 2014, Kerretta released the free to download track "The Guardsmen" in 2013, as well as drummer H.Walker releasing the record "Knowing" with Jeff Boyle Jakob under the moniker 'Mean' in 2012.

In 2014 after three European tours supporting "Saansilo", Kerretta released their third album entitled "Pirohia" through Golden Antenna.

They compiled an album of album out-takes, digital singles, reworks and unreleased recorded from 2007-2018 entitled 'Exiscens'.

In 2024, Kerretta released their 4th studio album entitled 'Angelm' through A Thousand Arms [North America] and Dunk! Records [Europe].

== Discography ==
=== Albums ===
- Vilayer (2009)
- Saansilo (2011)
- Pirohia (2014)
- Exiscens (2018)
- Angelm (2024)

=== EPs ===
- Antient (2008)

=== Featured ===
- "Shoot This Messenger", exclusive track on Effectuation compilation (2008)
- "Bird Soul (Kerretta rmx)", track on Rhythm, Sound and Movement remix album by Pitch Black (2009)

=== Singles ===
- Death in the Future/Wisnierska 7" (2007)
- The Guardsmen [Digital] (2013)
- His Streets of Honey, Her Mouth of Gold 7" (2014)
- Chroma Queens (2018)
- Eyes In The Bull Temple (2024)
