= Alternative Music Award =

Alternative Music Award may refer to:

== Awards ==
- Alternative Press Music Awards (US)
- Aotearoa Alternative Awards (New Zealand)
- Scottish Alternative Music Awards (UK)

== Award categories ==
=== Current ===
- Alternative Rock Artist of the Year, a category of the iHeartRadio Music Awards (US/international)
- Alternative Rock Song of the Year, a category of the iHeartRadio Music Awards (US/international)
- Aotearoa Music Award for Best Alternative Artist (New Zealand)
- Brit Award for British Rock/Alternative Act (UK)
- Grammy Award for Best Alternative Music Album (US/international)
- Grammy Award for Best Alternative Music Performance (US/international)
- Grammy Award for Best Latin Rock or Alternative Album (US/international)
- Juno Award for Adult Alternative Album of the Year (Canada)
- Juno Award for Alternative Album of the Year (Canada)
- MTV Europe Music Award for Best Alternative (Europe)
- MTV Video Music Award for Best Alternative Video (US/international)

=== Former ===
- ARIA Award for Best Adult Alternative Album (Australia)
- Top Alternative Album, a former Billboard Music Award (US/international)
- Top Alternative Artist, a former Billboard Music Award (US/international)
- Top Alternative Song, a former Billboard Music Award (US/international)

== See also ==
- Alternative hip hop
- Alternative pop
- Alternative rock
