= List of Aotearoa Music Award categories =

The Aotearoa Music Awards are awarded in several different categories. As of 2014, the awards are presented in 31 categories, and have been hosted annually since 1965.

== Current awards ==
| Award | First awarded |
|---|---|
| Album of the Year | 1973 |
| Single of the Year | 1965 |
| Best Group | 1973 |
| Best Solo Artist | 2017 |
| Breakthrough Artist of the Year | 1973 |
| Best Album Cover | 1979 |
| Best Alternative Artist | 2011 |
| Best Children's Music Artist | 1996 |
| Best Classical Artist | 1983 |
| Best Country Artist | 1983 |
| Best Electronic Artist | 2002 |
| Best Engineer | 1973 |
| Best Folk Artist | 1984 |
| Best Hip Hop Artist | 2017 |
| Best Jazz Artist | 1984 |
| Best Māori Artist | 1992 |
| Best Music Video Content | 1983 |
| Best Pacific Music Artist | 1982 |
| Best Pop Artist | 2010 |
| Best Producer | 1973 |
| Best Rock Artist | 2004 |
| Best Roots Artist | 2003 |
| Best Soul/RnB Artist | 2017 |
| Best Worship Artist | 1985 |
| Critics' Choice Prize | 2010 |
| International Achievement | 1983 |
| Legacy Award | 2007 |
| Highest Selling New Zealand Album | 2003 |
| Highest Selling New Zealand Single | 2003 |
| People's Choice Award | 2004 |
| Radio Airplay Record of the Year | 2004 |

== Past awards ==
| Award | Years awarded |
|---|---|
| Arranger of the Year | 1973 - 1976 |
| Best Cast Album | 1987 |
| Best Compilation Album | 2001-2002 |
| Best Female Solo Artist | 1978 - 2016 |
| Best Film Soundtrack | 1983 - 2000 |
| Best Male Solo Artist | 1978 - 2016 |
| Best Mana Māori Album | 1996 - 2003 |
| Best Mana Reo Album | 1996 - 2003 |
| Best New Artist | 1973 - 1976 |
| Best New Zealand Recorded Composition | 1973 - 1974 |
| Best Solo Artist | 2003 |
| Best Songwriter | 1986 - 2005 |
| Best Urban/Hip Hop Album | 2002 - 2016 |
| Composer of the Year | 1975 - 1976 |
| Lifetime Achievement | 1998 - 2004 |
| New Zealand Radio Programmer Award | 2000 - 2003 |
| Most Promising Female Vocalist | 1978 - 2000 |
| Most Popular Artist | 1983 |
| Most Popular Song | 1983 - 1984 |
| Most Promising Group | 1978 - 2000 |
| Most Promising Male Vocalist | 1978 - 2000 |
| Outstanding Contribution to the Music Industry | 1980 - 1990 |
| Outstanding Contribution to the Growth of New Zealand Music on Radio | 2005 - 2007 |
| Rising Star Award | 1996 - 1998 |
