= Solace (Jakob album) =

Studio album by Jakob
- Released: 11 September 2006
- Recorded: May 2006 at Venn Productions in Napier, New Zealand
- Genres: Post-rock, post-metal
- Length: 51:56
- Labels: Midium Records, Graveface Records
- Producer: David Holmes

Jakob chronology
Dominion (2004)	Solace (2006)	Sines (2014)

Professional ratings
Review scores
Source	Rating
NZ Herald	4/5 stars
Twisted Ear	3/5 stars

Solace is the third album by the New Zealand post-rock band Jakob. It was released through Midium Records in New Zealand on 11 September 2006 and on 7 May 2007 via Graveface Records in North America. The album was recorded, mixed and produced by David Holmes in May 2006 at Venn Productions in Auckland then mastered by Chris Winchcombe. First single "Safety in Numbers" was announced in August 2006 and later released as a music video directed by Ed Davis.

== Track listing ==
All songs written by Jakob.

No.	Title	Length
1.	"Malachite"	6:34
2.	"Pneumonic"	5:34
3.	"Lonesome"	8:00
4.	"Oran Mor"	5:16
5.	"Safety in Numbers"	7:53
6.	"Everything All of the Time"	9:38
7.	"Saint"	9:01
Total length:		51:56

== Personnel ==
Jakob

- Jeff Boyle – guitar
- Jason Johnston – drums
- Maurice Beckett – bass

Additional musicians

- Tristan Dingemans – guitar, vocals on "Everything All of the Time"
- Dave Holmes – guitar on "Lonesome"
- H. Walker – samples on "Pneumonic"

Production

- Jakob – mixing
- David Holmes – engineering, mixing, producer
- Chris Winchcombe – mastering
- Julian Smith – artwork
