= Uprising (Concord Dawn album) =

Studio album by Concord Dawn
- Released: (New Zealand) 14 June 2003
- Genre: Drum and bass
- Label: Uprising Records

Concord Dawn chronology
Disturbance (2001)	Uprising (2003)	Chaos by Design (2006)

Uprising is an album by New Zealand drum and bass group Concord Dawn, released in 2003. It features other New Zealand musicians such as Scribe and Salmonella Dub's front man Tiki and DJ Optiv. It is classed as their most popular album.

== Track listing ==
1. "Morning Light"
2. "Tonite"
3. "Get Ready" featuring Scribe
4. "Ninja"
5. "Raining Blood" (Slayer cover)
6. "Don't Tell Me" featuring Tiki and MC Jizzla
7. "Aurora"
8. "Horror Show"
9. "Let It Go"
10. "Scimitar"
11. "Zulu" featuring Optiv

The song Tonite has been remixed by Australian drum and bass band Pendulum.
