= Heal Me =

Studio album by Salmonella Dub
- Released: 2007
- Recorded: 2006, January–May 2007
- Studio: Salmonella Dub Hapuku Studio, Kaikōura
- Genre: Dub
- Length: 56:50
- Label: Virgin/EMI
- Producer: David Harrow

Salmonella Dub chronology
| Remixes and Radio Cuts (2006) | Heal Me (2007) | Feel the Seasons Change - Live with the NZSO (2008) |

Heal Me is the seventh studio album by New Zealand dub band Salmonella Dub. It was released in 2007.

A limited edition bonus disc was also released, with four remixes: "Gifts (Shiva dub"), "Lightning (Seens from space version)", "Watching it Rain (Frogga blues soaking it in mix)" and "Seeds (South of Critinden").

== Track listing ==
1. "Watching It Rain" – 5:28
2. "Beat the Game" – 4:40
3. "Love Sunshine and Happiness" – 5:19
4. "Lightning" – 4:53
5. "Heal Me" – 4:25
6. "Rong" – 5:12
7. "Gifts" – 5:04
8. "That Easy" – 4:51
9. "Seeds" – 7:56
10. "Nothing Is Free" – 5:56
11. "Hapuku Rain Outro" – 3:02

Heal Me: Tonic (limited edition bonus disc)

1. "Gifts" (Shiva Dub) – 9:05
2. "Lightning" (Seens from Space Version) – 4:25
3. "Watching It Rain" (Frogga Blues Soaking in It Mix) – 5:52
4. "Seeds (South of Critinden)" — 8:29

== Personnel ==
- Dave Deakins
- Andrew Penman
- Mark Tyler
- Peter Wood
- David Harrow – percussion, theremin, Juno 106, Wurlitzer Rhodes, vocals)
- Conan Wilcox – tenor saxophone on "Love Sunshine and Happiness" and "Gifts")

== Charts ==
Chart performance for Heal Me
| Chart (2007) | Peak position |
|---|---|
| Australian Albums (ARIA) | 93 |
| New Zealand Albums (RMNZ) | 2 |
