= Aotearoa Alternative Awards =

New Zealand music awards

- Country: New Zealand
- Formerly called: Student Radio Network Awards
- Established: 2021; 5 years ago
- Website: srn.nz

The Aotearoa Alternative Awards, formerly called the Student Radio Network Awards and colloquially known as the AAAs and the SRNs, are an annual celebration organised by the member stations of the Student Radio Network. The awards are presented in association with NZ On Air.

There are 10 awards which recognise efforts in contemporary and alternative music in New Zealand, as well as local venues and student radio. This includes a People's Choice award where the public vote between artists who have had a song playlisted on the student radio in the previous year.

The first awards ceremony was in December 2021. The host station changes each year. Each station is able to present the awards in a way of their choosing, with some incorporating skits and gags into their presentation. Live, local bands usually play during the ceremony. The 2025 awards were hosted on the 8th of November in Palmerston North, New Zealand, by Radio Control 99.4FM. There were over 150 nominees for 2025.

== See also ==
- bNet NZ Music Awards, which were organised by the Student Radio network and ran between 1998 and 2007.
- Radio in New Zealand
