= Chaos in the CBD =

New Zealand/British Music Group

Chaos In The CBD
- Origin: Auckland, New Zealand
- Genres: House; jazz; electronica; ambient
- Years active: 2011–present
- Label: In Dust We Trust (current)
- Members: Louis Helliker-Hales; Ben Helliker-Hales
- Website: chaosinthecbd.com

Chaos in the CBD are a house music group originally from Auckland, New Zealand. Founded in 2011, in 2012 they relocated to London. The group consists of brothers Louis and Ben Helliker-Hales.

== History ==
Louis and Ben grew up Auckland and relocated to South London in 2012. After a chance encounter with Bradley Zero shortly after they arrived in London the group became regulars at the Rhythm Section party series hosted by Zero in Peckham and released their Midnight in Peckham EP on the Rhythm Section International label in 2015.

In 2017 the group founded an independent label, In Dust We Trust, alongside friend and collaborator Jon Sable. Their releases since 2017 have come out on the label. In 2017 they were also nominated for the Aotearoa Music Award for Best Electronic Artist. In 2023 the group curated a mix album for the fabric presents series by Fabric Records. Their debut album A Deeper Life was released in May 2025. A Deeper Life reached number 34 on the New Zealand album's chart, and number 2 on the UK Dance Chart. Following the release of their album, they played at Parklife festival. They have played multiple sets for Boiler Room.

The group has collaborated with artists such as Nathan Haines and Novelist, and has remixed songs by Alton Miller and Zebra Katz.

== Discography ==
=== Studio albums ===
List of albums, with selected chart positions and certifications
Title	Details	Peak chart positions			Certifications
Title	Details	UK	UK Dance	NZ	Certifications
A Deeper Life	Released: 9 May 2025; Label: In Dust We Trust	-	2	34	
"—" denotes a recording that did not chart or was not released in that territory.

=== Extended plays ===
Year	Title	Details	Peak chart positions	Certification
Year	Title	Details	NZ	Certification
2012	Dusty Sundays	Released: 21 May 2012; Label: Amadeus Records	—	
2012	Slab	Released: 17 September 2012; Label: ClekClekBoom Recordings	—	
2015	Midnight in Peckham	Released: 24 August 2015; Label: Rhythm Section International	— (Note: "Midnight in Peckham" did not enter the Top 40 Albums Chart, but peaked at number 18 on the Official Top 20 Aotearoa Albums.)	
2015	Constraints of Time Travel	Released: 27 November 2015; Label: Church	—	
2016	Digital Harmony	Released: 15 January 2016; Label: Mule Musiq	—	
2017	Accidental Meetings	Released: 14 February 2017; Label: In Dust We Trust	—	
2017	Zona Del Silencio	Released: 29 September 2017; Label: In Dust We Trust	—	
2019	Hydrate	Released: 26 July 2019; Label: In Dust We Trust	—	
2021	Te Puke Thunder	Released: 2 April 2021; Label: In Dust We Trust	—	
2021	Brainstorm	Released: 17 September 2021; Label: In Dust We Trust	—	
2022	Intimate Fantasy	Released: 4 October 2022; Label: In Dust We Trust	—	
"—" denotes a recording that did not chart or was not released in that territory.

=== Singles ===
Year	Title	EP	Peak chart positions	Certification
Year	Title	EP	NZ	Certification
2013	Higher Elevation		— (Note: "Higher Elevation" did not enter the Top 40 Singles Chart, but peaked at number 12 on the Hot 20 Aotearoa Singles.)	
"—" denotes a recording that did not chart or was not released in that territory.

=== Mix Albums ===
- fabric presents: Chaos in the CBD (Fabric Records, 31 March 2023)

== Critical reception ==
Writing for the New Zealand Listener, Graham Reid gave the album A Deeper Live a positive review, describing the album as "laidback, crafted, subtle, sophisticated and chill".
