= Grant Sheehan =

New Zealand photographer

Grant Sheehan is a New Zealand photographer, writer, publisher, and film-maker raised in Nelson and now based in Wellington.

Sheehan’s photographs have featured in magazines and newspapers such as Condé Nast Traveler and the New York Times, and in over 30 books, including The Time Traveller's Guide to the Hamilton Gardens, In Memory of Travel, The Night Watchers: New Zealand Landscapes, Eye in the Sky: A Drone Above New Zealand, Landmarks – Historic Buildings of New Zealand; Cafés of the World, the internationally successful series A Place to Stay – Hotels of the World, Planet Penguin and New Zealand Landscapes from Northland to Antarctica.

He has twice won the New Zealand Travel Photographer of the Year Award (2002 and 2008), with images from international assignments. His work has been exhibited in galleries and museums.

In 2023, Sheehan was the subject of the documentary film by Robin Greenberg, Grant Sheehan: Light, Ghosts & Dreams which featured in the 2023 New Zealand International Film Festival.

Sheehan’s son Rhian Sheehan is a New Zealand composer and producer.

== Awards ==
- 2024 for Robin Greenberg: Diamond Award – Best Documentary Feature, 18th Annual SoCal Film Awards for Grant Sheehan: Light, Ghosts & Dreams
- 2024 for Robin Greenberg: Gold Award – Documentary Feature, Spotlight Documentary Film Awards for Grant Sheehan: Light, Ghosts & Dreams
- 2023 Pride in Print, Gold Medal Award for In Memory of Travel
- 2023 Resene Total Colour Residential Exterior Award
- 2013 Pride in Print, Gold Medal award in Publishing Category, Process Category and Gold award overall winner for Ghosts in the Landscape
- 2011 Winner, Travcom Pictorial Travel Book of the year award for New Zealand Landscapes, Northland to Antarctica
- 2009 Runner-up, Cathay Pacific Travel Photographer of the Year Award
- 2009 Runner-up, Highly Commended Jucy Rentals Award for the Best Travel Image Taken In New Zealand and Pacific Islands
- 2008 Winner, Cathay Pacific Travel Photographer of the Year Award
- 2008 Runner-up, The Leica Award for the Best Travel Image Taken Outside New Zealand
- 2008 Highly Commended, The Air Vanuatu and Le Meridian Port Vila Resort & Casino Award for the Best Series of Travel Images
- 2004 Third place, Avis Award for Best New Zealand Image
- 2002 Winner, Cathay Pacific Travel Photographer of the Year Award
- 1998 Runner-up, Travcom Maui Travel Photographer of the Year with the Sheraton Auckland Hotel and Towers
- 1997 Runner-up, American Express and Sheraton Auckland Hotel and Towers Award Photographic Award

== Notable exhibitions ==
- 2021 Does Ava Dream? Refinery Gallery, Nelson
- 2020 Does Ava Dream? Bottle Creek Gallery, Pataka, Porirua
- 2014 Ghosts in the Landscape. Black and white photographs. Bottle Creek Gallery, Pataka, Porirua
- 2012 Ghosts in the Landscape. Black and white photographs, Photographers Gallery, Hawke's Bay
- 2012 Ghosts in the Landscape. Black and white photographs, New Zealand landscape, Hedspace, Masterton.
- 2009 Antarctic Images, Photographs of Antarctic from the Sea – Joint exhibition, Bowen Gallery, Wellington.
- 2008 Photo Synthesis – New Photographs, Bowen Gallery, Wellington.
- 1994 Five Photographers – Works by five photographers, supported by Tradenz, Beijing, China.
- 1994 Lest We Forget – Wellington Photographers, Wellington City Art Gallery, Wellington.
- 1992 New Zealand Dance: Works by various photographers – toured nationally by the Regional Arts Council.
- 1989 Leading Lights, Light Houses of New Zealand – A documentation of New Zealand’s lighthouses – toured nationally by Tower Corporation.
- 1989 Works on Walls – Southern Cross Gallery, Auckland.
- 1988 Historic Wellington Buildings – Funded by Historic Places Trust, Antrim House, Wellington.
- 1983 Wellington Photographs – one-person show, Wellington City Art Gallery, Wellington.

== Selected publications ==
- 2024 The Time Traveller's Guide to the Hamilton Gardens, text by Peter Sergel, photography by Grant Sheehan, Phantom House Books, ISBN 9781738625000
- 2022 In Memory of Travel, by Grant Sheehan, Phantom House Books, ISBN 9780994128577
- 2020 The Making of Does Ava Dream by Grant Sheehan, Phantom House Books, ISBN 9780994128560
- 2020 Does Ava Dream aluminium pages with rotating hinge system, by Grant Sheehan, Phantom House Books
- 2017 The Night Watchers: New Zealand Landscapes, text and photography by Grant Sheehan, Phantom House Books, ISBN 9780994128522
- 2017 Lucy goes to the Lighthouse, text by Grant Sheehan, illustration by Rosalind Clark, Phantom House Books, ISBN 9780994128539
- 2016 Coffee U Feel: The Havana Coffee Works Story, Text Geoff Marsland with Tom Scott, Principal Photography by Grant Sheehan, Phantom House Books, ISBN 9780987666772
- 2016 Ivan And the Lighthouse, text by Grant Sheehan, illustration by Rosalind Clark, Phantom House Books, ISBN 9780994128515
- 2015 Eye in the Sky: A Drone Above New Zealand, text and photography by Grant Sheehan, Phantom House Books, ISBN 9780994128508
- 2013 Lights in the Landscape: New Zealand Lighthouses, text and photography by Grant Sheehan, Phantom House Books, ISBN 9780987666758
- 2012 The Second Black Dog Cottage Cookbook, text Adie McClelland, principal Photography by Grant Sheehan, Phantom House Books, ISBN 9780987666710
- 2011 Ghosts in the Landscape, text and photography by Grant Sheehan, Phantom House Books, ISBN 9780986457142
- 2010 Morning Noon & Night - Floriditas Café, Restaurant & Bakery, text Julie Clark and Marc Weir, photography by Grant Sheehan, Phantom House Books, ISBN 9780986457104

== Films and documentaries ==
- 2023 Does Ava Dream? Short experimental film about a sentient AI.
- 2026 The Time Traveller's Guide to Hamilton Gardens. Releases April 28 2026
- 2026 MAVERICK: Architect & Artist – Roger Walker. Currently in production.
