= Vilayer =

Studio album by Kerretta
- Released: 28 July 2009
- Genre: Experimental Rock, Instrumental
- Length: 44:53

Kerretta chronology
Vilayer (2009)	Saansilo (2011)

Vilayer is the debut album by the band Kerretta, released in 2009, and nominated for the New Zealand equivalent of the Mercury Prize, The Taite Music Prize.

== Track listing ==
1. Sleepers
2. Maven Fade
3. The Secret Is Momentum
4. Dinshah
5. The Square Outside
6. Nest Of Spies
7. White Lie
8. Bone Amber Reigns
