= Subsets of Sets =

Studio album by Jakob
- Released: August 2001
- Recorded: December 2000 – March 2001 at Venn Production Studios in Napier, New Zealand
- Genre: Post-rock
- Length: 55:13
- Label: Midium Records
- Producer: David Holmes

Jakob chronology
Jakob (1999)	Subsets of Sets (2001)	Cale:Drew (2003)

Professional ratings
Review scores
Source	Rating
Rip It Up	not rated
NZ Musician Magazine	not rated

Subsets of Sets is the 2001 debut album by New Zealand post-rock band Jakob.

== Track listing ==
No.	Title	Length
1.	"Drive Here and Then"	4:22
2.	"I'm on Your Side"	4:19
3.	"Nice Day for an Earthquake"	5:28
4.	"Ageena"	5:49
5.	"A Moment from Different Angles"	4:05
6.	"Aural"	2:03
7.	"Calmrock"	3:47
8.	"Overseen"	3:56
9.	"Sainnes"	3:44
10.	"Ryan"	6:15
11.	"The Collar Sets Well"	3:58
12.	"Some Summer"	7:27
Total length:		55:13

== Additional musicians ==
- Jesse Booher, vocals on Ryan
- Steve Gibbs, cello on Aural and Overseen

Promo videos were produced for I'm on Your Side, Nice Day for an Earthquake, and A Moment from Different Angles, directed by Ed Davis.
