= Inside the Dub Plates =

Studio album by Salmonella Dub
- Released: 10 August 2001
- Recorded: 2001
- Length: 57:48
- Label: EMI

Salmonella Dub chronology
Colonial Dubs (2000)	Inside the Dub Plates (2001)	Outside the Dub Plates (2002)

Inside the Dub Plates is the fourth studio album by New Zealand dub group Salmonella Dub, released in 2001. Salmonella Dub employed their old engineer David Wernham (currently with Shihad) to record all their live instrumentation on this album as well as Paddy Free to co-produce.

AllMusic noted about it, calling it "their most successful outing yet" and the group's "first number one album".

== Track listing ==
1. "Problems"
2. "Platetectonics (Fartyboom)"
3. "Love Your Ways"
4. "Wytaliba"
5. "Tha Bromley East Roller"
6. "Gospel According To Mant"
7. "Push On Thru"
8. "Loop 7"
9. "Ramblings From The Anatoki"
10. "Tui Dub"
