= Opensouls =

New Zealand band

Opensouls were a New Zealand band formed in 2001. After releasing numerous vinyl EPs, the band released their critically acclaimed debut album Kaleidoscope which impressed reviewers and fans alike. While this album draws inspiration from soul, reggae, jazz & blues styles, their next album, Standing in the Rain, was made with the intent to reflect the sound and feeling of a particular musical era: late 1950s and early 1960s British and American R&B. The band split up in 2011, playing their final live shows.

== Band members ==
- Bjorn Petersen – Vocals
- Tyra Hammond – Vocals
- Jeremy Toy - Guitar
- Chip Mathews – Bass
- Steph "Cee" Brown - Keys
- Julien Dyne - Percussion
- Scott Towers - Saxophone
- Cam Allen - Saxophone
- Isaac "Aesh" Aesili - Trumpet
- Harlin Davey - Turntables

== Discography ==
=== Albums ===
Year	Title	Label	NZ Top 40 Albums Chart	Copies Sold
2006	Kaleidoscope	From the Crate	29	
2009	Standing in the Rain	From the Crate	8	

== Awards and nominations ==
- Kaleidoscope was nominated for the Best Urban/Hip Hop album at the 2006 New Zealand Music Awards.
- 'What Do You Do?’ claimed the best hip-hop song at the 2006 bNet awards.
