= Sines (album) =

Studio album by Jakob
- Released: October 21, 2014
- Recorded: Roundhead Studios, Sister Lung Studios, Method Studio
- Genres: Post-rock, instrumental rock
- Length: 44:40
- Labels: The Mylene Sheath, Shoot The Freak Records
- Producer: Jakob

Jakob chronology
Solace (2006)	Sines (2014)

Sines is the fourth studio album by New Zealand post-rock band Jakob. It was released through The Mylene Sheath records on October 21, 2014. The album was recorded at Roundhead Studios and Sister Lung Studios in Auckland and Napier, respectively, mixed by Jeff Boyle and mastered by Chris Chetland. Rhian Sheehan contributed the string arrangements. Single "Blind Them with Science" premiered August 1, 2014.

== Reception ==
Professional ratings
Review scores
Source	Rating
The AU Review	9.5/10
Beat Magazine	Positive
Echoes and Dust	Positive
The New Zealand Herald	5/5 stars
Off the Tracks	Positive
Rolling Stone Australia	4/5 stars
Under the Radar	8/10

Upon release, the album was met with generally favorable reviews. Rod Whitfield of Beat Magazine gave the album a positive review and described the compositions on Sines as "strange and beautiful soundscapes [meant] to enthrall and entrap you" with "much ebb and flow…subtle in its delivery and effect." Whitfield called the use of "real" strings as "dark, melancholic [and beautiful]". He stated that the songs are "long, dense and…quite tough, [but] if you let them into your soul they are truly compelling." Another positive review from Nick Dodds of Echoes and Dust said the album was "magnificent", "glorious" and "wonderful...Forty four odd minutes of sublime beauty". In 2015 the album was awarded the Taite Music Prize.

== Track listing ==
No.	Title	Length
1.	"Blind Them with Science"	6:57
2.	"Emergent"	5:08
3.	"Magna Carta"	6:15
4.	"Harmonia"	6:05
5.	"Resolve"	9:11
6.	"Darkness"	5:37
7.	"Sines"	5:27
Total length:		44:40

== Personnel ==
Jakob

- Jeff Boyle – guitar, synth, samples
- Maurice Beckett – bass
- Jason Johnston – drums

Production

- Chris Chetland – mastering
- Jeff Boyle – mixing, engineering
- Aaron Harris – mixing
- David Holmes – mixing
- Nick Blow – mixing, engineering
- Jonathan Gardner – engineering
- Troy Kelly – strings engineering (2, 4)
- Rhian Sheehan – strings arrangement (2, 4)
- Maurice Beckett – photography
- Michael Hawksworth – artwork
- Anthony Flack – layout, design

Additional musicians

- Malcolm Struthers – double bass (2, 4)
- Rowan Prior – cello (2, 4)
- Ben Knapp – piano (2)
- Andrew Thomson – viola (2, 4)
- Anne Loeser – violin (2, 4)
- Jonathan Tanner – violin (2, 4)
- Rebecca Struthers – violin (2, 4)
