= Dubious Brothers =

Dubious Brothers were a hip-hop duo based in Hamilton, New Zealand, formed in 2000. Members were Chris Macro (born Christopher Shaw, beatmaker/engineer/producer) and Tyna Keelan (guitars/bass/emcee). While New Zealand/Aotearoa hip-hop at the time (led by Che Fu and King Kapisi) was tending to contain a South Pacific influence, Dubious Brothers produced a more international style. This was largely due to the time Keelan had spent as a musician in Europe and Asia.

== Trade Secrets and The Future ==
Dubious Brothers' one album, Trade Secrets, was released on Shock Records in June 2002. It spent three weeks in the RIANZ Top 50 Album chart, reaching 24. It was described as "an accomplished hip-hop album which manages to be as lyrically distinctive as it is often wondrously funky" and "a great debut" in a four-star New Zealand Herald review. A number of New Zealand hip-hop identities featured on Trade Secrets, including DJ Sirvere, Mareko (of Deceptakonz), Marcus (Native Sons) and 4Corners.

At the year's end, Trade Secrets placed 8th on the New Zealand Herald's top albums of 2002.

The album's lead single, The Future, tells a futuristic story set in the year 2012. Hip-hop has been outlawed and the protagonists smuggle mix tapes across borders like drugs.

Despite industry and media support, Trade Secrets was not a good seller (even when released with bonus material including a remix disc), and Dubious Brothers soon faded into a rapidly expanding local hip-hop scene.
