= Futureproof (novel) =

2006 novel by N. Frank Daniels

- First edition cover
- Author: N. Frank Daniels
- Publisher: Perennial/HarperCollins
- Publication date: January 27, 2009
- ISBN: 978-0-06-165683-5

Futureproof is a 2006 novel by American author N. Frank Daniels. It is a semi-autobiographical tale of the protagonist's troubled childhood and subsequent descent into drug and alcohol addiction.

Daniels started on the novel in 2003, and it took him almost two years to write. The publication of the novel was initially frustrated by the traditional publishing community, requiring Daniels to develop interest in the work on social media first.

The book received a generally positive reception, being reviewed by publications including Kirkus Reviews, Publishers Weekly, and Self-Publishing Review.
