= Radio 786 =

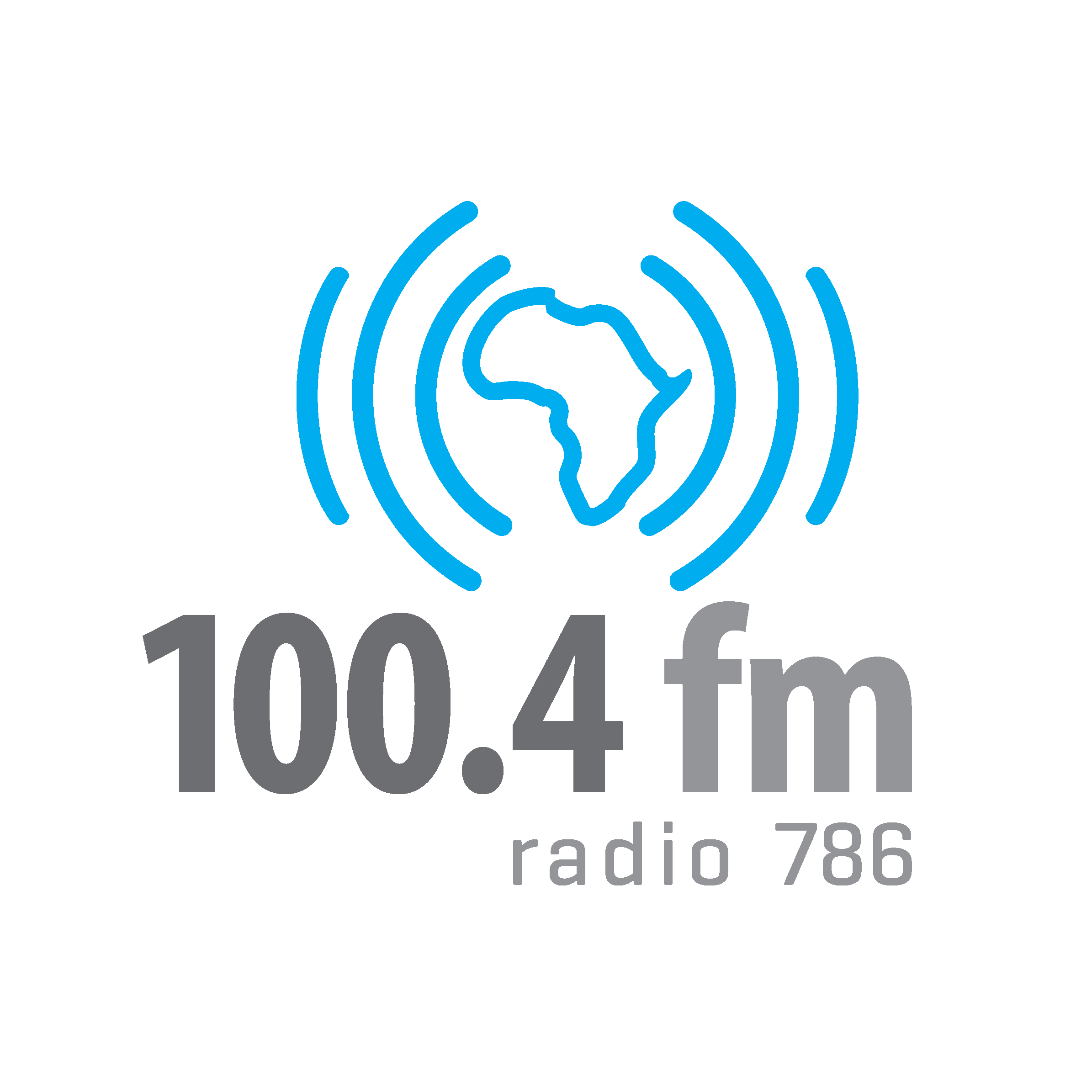
- Cape Town; South Africa
- Broadcast area: Western Cape
- Frequency: 100.4 FM

Links
- Website: www.radio786.co.za

Radio 786 is a community talk radio station broadcasting on 100.4FM to the Greater Cape Town Metropole Area in the Western Cape and globally via online streaming . It was launched in September 1995 at the Vygieskraal Stadium in Rylands Estate, South Africa, with over 30,000 listeners and supporters in attendance.

The station's motto is "Inform, educate, uplift". This is reflected in its broad range of programming which discusses news and current affairs, social issues, and lighter subjects of public interest.

The station's morning drivetime show, 'News, Reviews and Analysis', is particularly acclaimed for its discussion of topical matters with high-profile members of parliament, politicians, and newsmakers. Radio 786 is a Standing Committee of the Islamic Unity Convention with independent editorial and financial policies.
On 1 December 2016, it launched its new digital Broadcasting Centre which incorporates three distinct areas of broadcasting to suit the station's programming portfolio. The studio is also designed for television and video.

Radio 786 competes on a regional, national, and international level.

- BBC Africa Young Broadcaster of the Year - Qaanita Dramat
- Vodacom Journalist of the Year - Tashreeq Truebody
- IRIB International Radio Awards - Hassen Seria
