= Shapeshifter (band) =

New Zealand musical group

- Origin: Christchurch, New Zealand
- Genres: Drum and bass; dub; soul; liquid funk
- Years active: 1999–present
- Labels: Truetone; Hospital
- Members: Nick Robinson; Dan McGruer; Sam Trevethick; Paora 'P Digsss' Apera; Darren Mathiassen
- Past members: Redford Grenell; Johnny Hooves; Devin Abrams
- Website: shapeshifter.co.nz

Shapeshifter (sometimes referred to as New Zealand Shapeshifter) are a live heavy soul electronic music act from New Zealand. They are known for their live shows and blend of heavy soul with a mix of drum and bass. They have made appearances at Glastonbury, The Big Chill, Big Day Out, Parklife plus sold-out performances across Europe, Australia and New Zealand.

== History and biography ==
Shapeshifter formed in 1999 after the four founding members met at jazz school in Christchurch, New Zealand. They had a range of musical backgrounds ranging from dub, jazz, and hip-hop, to metal, funk and electronica. As a result, they decided to bring these influences together to create live drum & bass. After playing locally, they released an early EP entitled D.N.A.

In 2001, Shapeshifter released their debut LP entitled Realtime. The album included a collaboration with vocalist Ladi6 on the track "Move With Me" as well as Kaps (Fabel) and Tiki (Salmonella Dub) on production. Realtime was awarded the 'Best Electronic Release' title at the 2002 bNet NZ Music Awards, and was also nominated at the RIANZ NZ Music Awards for 'Best Electronic Album'.

In 2002, Shapeshifter relocated to Melbourne. They toured extensively, performing at events such as the 4ZZZ Market Day Festival in Brisbane, the Bellingen Global Carnival, and sold-out shows in Sydney, Melbourne and Byron Bay.

In late-2003, vocalist Paora Apera (aka P Digsss) joined Shapeshifter's live line-up. The new line-up was road tested on Salmonella Dub's One Drop East album release tour of Australia in August/September. Shapeshifter played 12 shows in various cities to an overwhelming crowd response. Other highlights included their first tour of Europe at locations including London, Edinburgh and Rotterdam.

In 2004, Shapeshifter then released their second album Riddim Wise. This was their step towards a more atmospheric style of drum and bass. Recorded at the group's own home studio in Melbourne, the album features collaborations with Aotearoa vocalists Dallas Tamaira aka Joe Dukie (Fat Freddy's Drop), Karoline Tamati aka Lady 6 (Verse 2/Sheelahroc) and Paora Apera aka P Digsss. The album was praised as a steady progression from 'Realtime', with an emphasis on funky dancefloor grooves, whilst maintaining strong musical elements. The album became the #1 Independent NZ album release and also the #1 NZ National Dance Album in New Zealand history.

The band's third album Soulstice was released in August 2006, with lead single "Bring Change" receiving extensive video and radio play. The album takes influences from soul, reggae, funk, rock, and drum 'n' bass. Soulstice obtained Gold sales status in New Zealand in three weeks and has since achieved Platinum sales. September 2006 saw Shapeshifter tour throughout New Zealand, performing with leading orchestras and selling out their shows weeks in advance. In 2007, Shapeshifter released a live album entitled Shapeshifter Live which was recorded on 29 September 2006 at the Christchurch Town Hall – the final show of their orchestra tour and in the band's hometown. This 6-track album contained a previously unreleased song called "Good Looking" and appeared alongside other popular Shapeshifter tracks such as "Tapestry", "Bring Change" and "One".

In 2008, Shapeshifter embarked on their fourth European tour playing sold-out dates in Paris, Rotterdam, Amsterdam, Scotland and England. The tour also promoted their single "One", released in May 2008, and off the back of the tour and single, the decision was made to release Soulstice' in the UK and Europe. This was released on 17 November on Mums The Word Records with a special re-designed package that includes new artwork and exclusive remixes from D-Bridge (Exit Records), Nu:Tone and The Nextmen. Shapeshifter also toured Australia at the end of 2008 and during their summer tour of New Zealand, they played new unreleased tracks including "Dutchies", "Lifetime", "One", "Twin Galaxies", "Warning" and "System" some of which appeared on their next album entitled, The System Is A Vampire, released 12 November 2009. Shapeshifter also released a remix EP in late 2008 featuring two alternative versions of their song "Bring Change" by themselves and fellow New Zealand drum and bass artists, The Upbeats. A remix of their song "Long White Cloud" was also included, remixed by Nu:Tone. Shapeshifter also released a remix of their hit tune, Electric Dream which was remixed by New Zealand drum and bass act, State of Mind.

Shapeshifter also have their own recording label called Truetone Recordings. Their first album, Realtime, and early EPs were released under Kog Transmissions.

November 2009 saw the release of the band's fourth studio album entitled The System Is A Vampire with lead single "Dutchies". The album was shortlisted for the inaugural Taite Music Prize in 2010. In September 2009 during a tour of Australia, drummer Redford Grenell left the band. He was replaced by drummer and producer Johnny Hooves. P. Digsss stated that Mr. Grenell had told the band that he had "sadly come to the end of his road" with Shapeshifter and wanted to no longer tour. In 2013, Johnny Hooves left the band and was replaced by Wellington drummer Darren Mathiassen.

The band embarked on a summer tour throughout New Zealand in December 2009/January 2010. They played at Coromandel Gold in front of 10,000 people to welcome in the new year. They repeated this concert in the summer of 2011.

In July 2010, Shapeshifter were signed by UK Drum and Bass label Hospital Records, who released Shapeshifter's platinum-selling album The System is a Vampire globally. They also released a new collection of remixes in October 2010 entitled 'The System is a Remix'. It features a range of Shapeshifter remixed tunes from Logistics, Camo & Krooked, Netsky, State of Mind and The Upbeats.

The band is known in the UK and Europe as "New Zealand Shapeshifter" in order to differentiate themselves from popular house act "The Shapeshifters".

In 2013, Shapeshifter released their 5th studio album titled "Delta" which includes lead singles Monarch, Diamond Trade and Gravity. It was recorded in Berlin, Germany and Wellington, New Zealand and was released on 31 May followed by a NZ wide tour. The album has been mixed by NZ drum and bass producers The Upbeats.

In 2014, one of the founding members Devin Abrams left the band half during European tour and was replaced by Dan McGruer.

In July 2016, Shapeshifter released a new single, "Stars", from their new album to rave reviews. The title track of the album is also the first song on the album and instantly draws the listener in with its etheric, carnival type atmosphere. It is a summer anthem song and over my travels this summer it is definitely a song I have heard multiple times from cars with their windows down and occupants singing along having the time of their life".

In 2018, New Zealand Prime Minister Jacinda Ardern gifted Shapeshifter's The System Is A Vampire CD and a Stars vinyl to Prince Harry and Meghan, the Duchess of Sussex, during their royal tour of the South Pacific.

In June 2024, following Shapeshifter's 25th Anniversary tour the band had 6 LP's place in the Official Top 20 NZ Albums, being the first in New Zealand to achieve these placements.

== Side projects ==
Vocalist P.Digss is part of The Sunshine Soundsystem, who play around New Zealand with a hip-hop, funk, dancehall, reggae and jungle flavour. They regularly play the Kaikoura Roots Festival, Rippon Festival, Destination and have supported acts such as The Nextmen, Aphrodite and London Elektricity.

Nick Robinson DJs under the name "Nicky Research" and Sam Trevethick DJs under the name "Sambora".

P-Digsss, Sambora and Nicky Research perform together as "The Peacekeepers".

Shapeshifter also has a close working relationship with ex-Salmonella Dub front man Tiki Taane. Upon the release of Taane's debut solo album, Past, Present, Future, in 2008, Members of Shapeshifter were asked to tour with Taane in his live band "The Dub Soldiers" to help promote the new album. Tiki Taane is also Shapeshifter's sound technician during their live shows.

In 2014, Shapeshifter collaborated with another New Zealand drum and bass group known as The Upbeats to produce an EP album, combining two entirely different styles of DnB.

== Band members ==
- Sam Trevethick – keyboards, guitar, percussion
- Paora 'P Digsss' Apera – vocals
- Dan McGruer – synths
- Darren Mathiassen – drums
- Nick Robinson – bass, keyboards

== Discography ==
=== Albums ===
Year	Title	Details	Peak chart positions	Certifications
Year	Title	Details	NZ	Certifications
2001	Realtime	Released: 1 May 2001; Label: Kog Transmissions; Singles: "Move with Me", "Tapestry"	—	—
2004	Riddim Wise LP	Label: Truetone; Singles: "Been Missin", "When I Return", "Long White Cloud"	29	NZ: Gold
2006	Soulstice	Released: 13 January 2007; Label: Truetone; Singles: "Bring Change", "Electric Dream", "One"; Catalogue: TONELP002	4	NZ: 2× Platinum
2007	Shapeshifter Live	Released: 2007; Label: Truetone	6	—
2009	The System Is a Vampire	Released: 12 November 2009; Label: Truetone; Catalogue: TONELP005; Singles: "Dutchies", "Twin Galaxies", "System"	1	NZ: Platinum
2010	The System Is a Remix	Label: Hospital	—	—
2011	System Remix	Released: 20 March 2011; Label: Truetone; Catalogue: TONELP007	10	NZ: Platinum
2013	Delta	Released: 31 May 2013; Label: Truetone; Catalogue: TONELP008; Singles: "Monarch", "Diamond Trade", "Gravity", "Stadia"	1	NZ: 2× Platinum
2016	Stars	Released: 4 November 2016; Label: A.R.T	2	—
2021	Rituals	Released: 30 July 2021; Label: A.R.T	6	—

=== EPs ===
Year	Title	Details
2001	D.N.A.	Label: Kog Transmissions
2003	Styles	Label: Kog Transmissions
2003	Been Missing/Relocator	Label: Kog Transmissions

=== Singles ===
Year	Title	Peak chart positions	Album
Year	Title	NZ	Album
2000	"Realtime"	—	Non-album single
2001	"Tapestry"	—	Real Time
2001	"Move with Me"	—	Real Time
2003	"Been Missing"	—	Riddim Wise LP
2004	"When I Return"	—	Riddim Wise LP
2005	"Long White Cloud"	—	Riddim Wise LP
2006	"Bring Change"	—	Soulstice
2007	"One"	—	Soulstice
2007	"Electric Dream"	—	Soulstice
2009	"Dutchies"	20	The System Is a Vampire
2009	"Twin Galaxies"	—	The System Is a Vampire
2011	"Monarch"	22	Delta
2013	"Gravity"	12	Delta
2013	"In Colour"	11	Delta
2016	"Stars"	—	Stars
2020	"Lightspeed"	— (Note: The original version did not chart, but the Flowidus remix of "Lightspeed" peaked at number 22 on the NZ Hot Singles Chart.)	Non-album singles
2021	"Ritual (Under Your Spell)"	— (Note: "Ritual (Under Your Spell)" did not enter the NZ Top 40 Singles Chart, but peaked at number 18 on the NZ Hot Singles Chart.)	Non-album singles
2021	"Found in You"	— (Note: "Found in You" did not enter the NZ Top 40 Singles Chart, but peaked at number 14 on the NZ Hot Singles Chart.)	Non-album singles
2022	"Crystal Eyes"	— (Note: "Crystal Eyes" did not enter the NZ Top 40 Singles Chart, but peaked at number 10 on the NZ Hot Singles Chart.)	Non-album singles
2023	"Runaway"	— (Note: "Runaway" did not enter the NZ Top 40 Singles Chart, but peaked at number 16 on the NZ Hot Singles Chart.)	Non-album singles
2023	"Amokura"	— (Note: "Amokura" did not enter the NZ Top 40 Singles Chart, but peaked at number 27 on the NZ Hot Singles Chart.)	Non-album singles

=== Featured appearances ===
The group have appeared on many compilations and soundtracks since 2001 in New Zealand. The following is a list of these albums that have featured tracks by Shapeshifter.

- 2001 - The Gathering 3: Unity Through Diversity (Virgin) - DNA
- 2002 - The Gathering Aotearoa 2002 (Loop) - Tapestry
- 2002 - Heads Up!!! Music From The 2002 bNet Music Awards (Festival Mushroom) - Move With Me featuring Ladi6
- 2002 - In 2 Deep (Fabel Music) - Move With Me (Remix)
- 2002 - Loop. Select 003 (Loop Recordings Aot(ear)oa) - Move With Me featuring Ladi6
- 2005 - Dub Conspiracy - "Tapestry"
- 2005 - Kaikoura Roots Festival 2005 - Been Missin and Ganja Love
- 2007 - Nuclear Free Nation (Motu Karihi Kau) (CD/DVD) - Bring Change
- 2019 - Waiata / Anthems - Ngā Kano / In Colour

== Awards ==
Shapeshifter have enjoyed many awards and nominations at the publicly voted bNet NZ Music Awards, held annually And also the Vodafone New Zealand Music awards (Tui Awards)

- 2000 - Winner of the Best New Act
- 2001 - Nominated for Best Live Act and Best Electronic Release (D.N.A. EP)
- 2002 - Winner of the Best Electronic Release (Realtime)
- 2002 - Nominated for Best Song (Tapestry) and Best Album (Realtime)
- 2003 - Showcase performance at awards ceremony
- 2006 - Winner of Best Album (Soulstice) Best Song (Bring Change)and Best Live Act
- 2007 - Tui Award winner for Best Electronic Release (Soulstice) and Best Live Act
- 2013 - Tui Award winner for Best Electronic Album (Delta) and Best Live act.
- 2015 - Nominated for Best Electronic Album (Shapeshifter & The Upbeats - SSXUB)
- 2016 - Nominated for Single of the Year (Stars), with showcase performance at the Awards ceremony
- 2016 - Nominated for Best Group
- 2017 - Nominated for Artisan Awards: NZ On Air Best Music Video (Her) and Best Album Cover (Stars)
- 2021 - Nominated for Best Group and Best Electronic Artist (Rituals)

In 2005, Shapeshifter's video for Long White Cloud, Directed by Ash Bolland won Best Electronic Release at the Juice TV Awards.
