= The Stomach (venue) =

New Zealand music venue

Coordinates: 40°21′17.5″S 175°36′22.63″E

- Interactive map of The Stomach
- Location: Palmerston North, New Zealand
- Capacity: 150
- Type: Music venue, studio and rehearsal space

Construction
- Opened: 1988

Website
- https://www.creativesounds.org.nz/

The Stomach, also known as Creative Sounds: The Stomach and The Tummy, is a music venue, music studio, and rehearsal space located in Palmerston North, New Zealand. The venue focuses on artists playing their original music.

The venue was opened in 1988, within a previously vacant, Council-owned building in a semi-industrial area on the fringe of the central business district. The building was initially shared with a charity organisation. By the mid-2000s, The Stomach had a negative stigma of being a hangout for rowdy teenagers and the building was needing maintenance. This led to the building being renovated in 2008. The Stomach is the primary venue for Swampfest, a music festival showcasing local acts. The Stomach often partners with the local student radio station Radio Control 99.4FM to record live music sets. The venue has roots in the punk movement and caters to all ages.

The venue is managed by a volunteer committee and is operated as a not-for-profit charity. It largely relies on grants from local and central government, and hosts music workshops for people with disabilities.
