= Radio Sole =

Italian independent local eadio station

Radio Sole, formerly known as Radio Daisy International, was an independent local radio station based in Galatina (Lecce), Southern Italy.

== History ==
It was one of the oldest independent radio stations in Italy since it opened in 1975, soon after it became legal to broadcast for private stations in Italy. The most famous speaker is Giuseppe Levanto.

The station has maintained its music policy mainly characterised by Italian pop music and news.

The station broadcast on one frequency in the area of Galatina, 100.4 FM, and it was also available through live web streaming.

It closed in 2009.
