= The Most FM =

Radio station in New Plymouth, New Zealand

New Plymouth; New Zealand
- Broadcast area: Taranaki
- Frequency: 100.4 MHz (FM)
- Branding: The Most

Programming
- Format: Alternative/Specialist

Ownership
- Owner: Taranaki FM Trust

History
- Founded: 1995
- First air date: 1995
- Former frequencies: 92.3 MHz

Technical information
- ERP: 300 Watts

Links
- Webcast: Live stream
- Website: Official website

The Most FM is a radio station broadcasting on 100.4 FM in Taranaki, New Zealand. The station is operated by volunteers and owned by the Taranaki FM Trust.

== History ==
The station began in 1995, originally only broadcasting one month out of the year, but by November 1997, it was broadcasting full-time. It operated for almost a decade on 92.3 MHz, being run by a willing and enthusiastic pool of students and volunteers.

As a result of a bureaucratic glitch, Most FM lost its original license in early 2008. The resulting public outcry caused by Most FM going off air led to the formation of the Taranaki FM Trust, a consortium of local businessmen and well-wishers who vowed to get the station back on air.

In March 2008, after a two-month break in transmission, Most FM began operating on 107.6 FM, but on a very localised frequency range. However, on Friday 15 August, Most FM 'powered up' on the new frequency of 100.4 FM, moving up from 100 to 300 watts. The Most has a wide range of alternative and specialist shows, reflecting the eclectic tastes of its show hosts and DJs. In April 2010 the station began relaying on 88.3 MHz to the town of Ōakura which was previously out of range. Internet streaming also resumed online.

The station broadcasts live weekday mornings from 6:30 am to 10 am. During the day the output is programmed with a live drive show from Monday-Thursday and specialised shows on Friday afternoon. In the evenings a wide range shows are offered by volunteers and cover diverse genres such as Rock, Drum & Bass, Gospel, interviews with NZ artists and comedy. Saturday mornings are dedicated to a live local sports show between 8am-9am followed by a live magazine-lifestyle show until noon. Sundays are given over entirely to volunteers when a full day of shows kicks off at 8 am and runs through until 8 pm. Classic rock, Blues, Live recordings and Electronica all feature in the mix.
