= The Stomach =

- Directed by: Ben Steiner
- Written by: Ben Steiner
- Produced by: Dan Dixon
- Starring: Simon Meacock; Ben Bishop; Peter Marinker; Kiki Kendrick; Neil Newbon
- Cinematography: Dominic Bartels
- Edited by: Dan Dixon; Jacob Proctor
- Music by: Dicken Marshall
- Production company: Fume Films
- Distributed by: Fume Films
- Release date: 21 September 2014 (Fantastic Fest)
- Running time: 15 minutes
- Country: United Kingdom
- Language: English

The Stomach is a 2014 British short horror film written and directed by Ben Steiner. It blends elements of body horror, crime thriller, gangster, noir, and supernatural horror films.

The film had its world premiere on 21 September 2014 at Fantastic Fest, where it won Best Horror Short. A feature-length adaptation announced in late 2014, but there have been no updates since.

== Synopsis ==
A medium finds that his talents are more of a curse than a gift, as his stomach will swell and pulsate whenever a spirit is present, enabling those who hire him to talk to their dead loved ones at the cost of his own physical wellbeing. Tired of the pain and suffering, he plans to leave this career behind, only to discover that one of his customers will not accept his decision.

== Cast ==
- Simon Meacock as Frank
- Ben Bishop as Tom
- Peter Marinker as Mr. Pope
- Kiki Kendrick as Gloria
- Neil Newbon as Charlie

== Reception ==
Dread Central praised The Stomach and wrote, "A mixture of genres packed into 15 minutes, The Stomach is a triumphant mash of Cockney gangster-ism, ghost story, and Cronenberg-esque body horror." Twitch Film also enjoyed the film and marked Steiner as "a filmmaker to watch".

== Awards ==
- Best Horror Short at Fantastic Fest (2014, won)
- Short Film Melies d’Argent at Abertoir (2014, won)
- Best Short at Celluloid Screams (2014, won)
- Best Special Effects/ Make Up at Turin Horror Film Festival (2014, won)
