= The System Is a Vampire =

The System Is A Vampire

Studio album by Shapeshifter
- Released: 2009
- Genre: Drum 'n Bass
- Length: 67min
- Label: Truetone

Shapeshifter chronology
Shapeshifter Live (2007)	The System Is A Vampire (2009)

Professional ratings
Review scores
Source	Rating
NZ Herald	link

The System Is A Vampire is an album released by New Zealand drum and bass band, Shapeshifter in 2009.

== Track listing ==
1. "Dutchies"
2. "Lifetime"
3. "Longest Day"
4. "Fire"
5. "The Touch"
6. "Twin Galaxies"
7. "Warning"
8. "System"
9. "Tokyo"
10. "Voyager"
11. "Sleepless"
