= Rhombus (band) =

New Zealand roots reggae band

- Genres: Reggae; dub; roots reggae
- Years active: 2001–present
- Labels: FMR; Vitamin
- Members: Simon Rycroft; Thomas Voyce; Koa Williams; Raashi Malik; Lisa Tomlins; MC Antsman; MC Mana; Darren Mathiassen; Stephen Gallagher

Rhombus are a dub/drum and bass/roots reggae band from Wellington, New Zealand.

== History ==
Rhombus was formed in 2001 by Thomas Voyce and Simon Rycroft and has a rotating cast of vocalists and musicians. Apart from the founders, Koa Williams has been one of the mainstays of the band's lineup, acting as DJ and manager.

The band has toured extensively in their native New Zealand along with a few international dates, notably in Japan (2002) and in Australia, playing twice at the Sydney Opera House in November 2004. They also performed at the Big Day Out in 2006.

Rhombus have given their time to a number of causes including Greenpeace, Tsunami Relief, SurfAid International, the Cancer Society, and the Peace Boat. Their travels on the Japanese-based global NGO Peace Boat have taken them through the Caribbean, with the intent of "spreading the values of sustainability, co-operation and peace through music workshops".

In 2003, they won three awards at the bNet NZ Music Awards for "Best Video", "Best Electronic Release", and "Best Album". Their 2003 album Bass Player was their most successful with regard to chart position, peaking at #18 in the New Zealand Top 40 Albums charts.

== Discography ==
Date of Release	Title	Label	Charted	Country	Catalog Number	Ref.
2002	Bass Player	Vitamin	#18	NZ	335902	
2005	Future Reference	Vitamin	#19	NZ	82876720402	
2006	Onwards: Remixes and Archives	Vitamin	-	-	RMA003	
2008	Rhombus	Rhombus Music New Zealand	#29	NZ	RHOM-003	
2022	After Party	Rhombus Music New Zealand	-	-		

== Band members ==
Credits obtained from Muzic.NZ

Founders

- Simon Rycroft – beats, dubs (2001–present)
- Thomas Voyce – bass, keys (2001–present)

Others

- Ahmen Mahal (2001–2007)
- Koa Williams – DJ, manager (2001–present)
- MC Antsman – vocals
- MC Mana – vocals
- Raashi Malik – vocals
- Lisa Tomlins – vocals
- Darren 'D' Mathiassen – drums
