= Bass Player (album) =

Studio album by Rhombus
- Released: 2002
- Genre: Reggae
- Label: FMR, Vitamin
- Producer: Thomas Voyce, Simon Rycroft

Rhombus chronology
Bass Player (2002)	Future Reference (2005)

Singles from Bass Player
- 1. "Clav Dub" Released: 15 September 2002

Bass Player is the debut album by New Zealand reggae band, Rhombus. It was released in 2002. The album peaked at #18 in the New Zealand Top 40 Albums charts. The song "Clav Dub" reached #16 in the New Zealand Top 40 Singles charts.

== Track listing ==
1. "Onwards (Step It Up)"
2. "Pushing Blocks"
3. "Hiroshima Station"
4. "Clav Dub"
5. "Spaceman"
6. "Tour Of Outer Space"
7. "Bass Player"
8. "JP-Dub"
9. "Winds"
10. "Piano"
11. "Dead And Gone"
12. "Homeless"
13. "Sweetness"

=== Special edition CD (2003) ===
14. Onwards (Si's Club Mix)
15. Onwards (Si's Radio Mix)
16. Onwards (Onmecha Mix)
17. Onwards ) (Onmecha Instrumental)
18. Clav Dub (Dub Pie Mix)
19. Clav Dub x) (Steak & Mushroom Mix)
20. Clav Dub (Pie Sandwich Mix)
21. Tour of Outer Space (Theupbeats Mix)
22. Tour of Outer Space (Theupbeats Radio Mix)
23. Tour of Outer Space (Oceans Mix)

== Certifications ==
Region	Certification	Certified units/sales
New Zealand (RMNZ)	Platinum	15,000^{^}
^{^} Shipments figures based on certification alone.
