= RDU-FM =

Student radio station in New Zealand

RDU 98.5FM
New Zealand
- Broadcast area: Christchurch New Zealand
- Frequency: 98.5 MHz (FM) since 2003, 98.3 MHz (FM) until 2003
- Branding: RDU 98.5FM

Programming
- Format: Student Radio Alternative culture

History
- First air date: 1976

Technical information
- Transmitter coordinates: 43.581°S 172.6556°E

Links
- Website: https://rdu.org.nz

RDU 98.5FM is a student radio station operating in Christchurch. It broadcasts on a frequency of 98.5 MHz, and is a member of the Student Radio Network of stations.

RDU began in 1976 on 1420kHz. During the period 1977 to 1985 the station was on 1230, 1503 (3XU) and 1422 kHz (3XB). FM broadcasts started in 1986 on 90.5 MHz and moved to 98.3 MHz in 1987 until 2003.

== History ==
Wammo and Spanky became an infamous duo on the RDU Mornings show, most notably coaxing Don Brash into answering inappropriate love letters live on-air, and upsetting listeners by playing distasteful games poking fun at cancer victims. Wammo was scouted by Kiwi FM and was replaced by Kate Gorgeous, who hosted the show for a year till the end of 2007. After much searching for a new host, Spanky has returned to host the show solo under the new show title Breakfast with Spanky.

Many of the shows on RDU have been on air for many years. Girl School, The Mixtape Sessions, The Joint, Guitar Media, Dollar Mix, Hauswerk and Vintage Cuts are all popular long-running shows that are regular each week.

Since late 2006 RDU online streaming has been operating reliably, enabling the station's unique sound to now reach a global audience.

In 2007, the University of Canterbury Students' Association controversially agreed to sub-licence the RDU frequency to a newly formed company, RDU98.5FM Ltd and students against the sale selectively leaked information to the Press stating the station was sold for the price of $1. Actually the station's assets including broadcast equipment and transmitters were sold at market (book) value, a market level rental agreed for the space occupied and an annual licence fee agreed.

Various arrangements were debated over the preceding three years following the previous limited liability company (controlled by minority shareholders) trading insolvently which forced UCSA to inject funds and restructure the organisation.
