= State of Mind (band) =

New Zealand drum and bass duo

- Origin: Auckland, New Zealand
- Genre: Drum and bass
- Occupations: DJ, record producer, record label owner
- Years active: 2002–present
- Labels: Blackout & SOM Music
- Members: Patrick Hawkins; Stuart Maxwell
- Website: State of Mind official website

State of Mind is a New Zealand drum and bass duo consisting of Patrick Hawkins and Stuart Maxwell. The band formed in 2002. They are from Auckland, New Zealand.

The State of Mind discography includes labels such as Teebee's Subtitles Recordings, Total Science's CIA Recordings, DJ Friction's Shogun Audio, Concord Dawn's Uprising Records, Doc Scott's 31 Records, Bad Company's BC Presents. They are now signed exclusively to Blackout Music.

== Biography ==
State of Mind were the hosts of the New Zealand radio station 95bfm drum and bass show "The Next Level".

They have released 5 studio albums. Take Control, Faster than Light, Nil by Ear, Eat the Rich, Land of the Blind.

Take Control was released through Uprising Records in New Zealand only via CD format, featuring the artist's most successful single Sunking licensed from CIA Recordings. It is no longer available, although most material from the album is available via streaming. Their second LP, Faster Than Light, featured guest appearances from New Zealand artists PNC and Tiki Taane and was released on their own label, SOM Music. In April 2011, their album Nil By Ear was released with 12 songs including their main 3 singles which include Return Of The Prophet which features PNC. In 2014 Eat the Rich was released on Dutch label Blackout Music. This album represented a sonic shift by State of Mind towards a harder sound, and went on to achieve international recognition, playing a significant role in the revival of the neurofunk sound within Drum and Bass. After a brief hiatus State of Mind released their 5th album Land of the Blind, also on Blackout Music.

State of Mind have been recognised for their success many times in New Zealand. They took out the "Breakthrough Artist" award and shared "Electronic Single of the Year" with Concord Dawn for the song Aces High at the 2006 bNet Awards. They were nominated at the 2007 New Zealand Music Awards for "Best Electronic Album" for their debut LP Take Control, the 2012 New Zealand Music Awards for "Best Electronic Album" with Nil By Ear and the 2020 New Zealand Music Awards for "Best Electronic Artist" with their album Land of the Blind.

Internationally they have been finalists twice in the UK Drum and Bass Arena Awards for best album, winning once. Their fourth studio album Eat the Rich won in 2014, while the follow-up album Land of the Blind ultimately lost to Chase and Status in 2019.

== Discography ==
- 2006: Take Control (Uprising Records)
- 2009: Faster Than Light (SOM Music)
- 2011: Nil By Ear (SOM Music)
- 2012: Live (SOM Music)
- 2014: Eat the Rich (Blackout Music NL)
- 2019: Land of the Blind (Blackout Music NL)
