= Soulstice (album) =

Studio album by Shapeshifter
- Released: 2006
- Recorded: 2005–2006
- Genre: Drum and bass
- Length: 69 min
- Label: Truetone

Shapeshifter chronology
Riddim Wise (2004)	Soulstice (2006)	Shapeshifter Live (2007)

Professional ratings
Review scores
Source	Rating
NZ Herald	4/5 stars
Allmusic	4/5 stars

Soulstice is an album released by New Zealand drum and bass band Shapeshifter in 2006 on Truetone Recordings. The album reached No. 4 on the New Zealand Albums chart.

== Overview ==
It is the third album from the group, and the first to have former part-time contributor P Digsss as a permanent feature in the group's line up. This is reflected throughout the album as many of the tracks contain vocals compared to Shapeshifter's earlier, more traditional work. Soulstice manages to successfully blend many genres into this album which might be described as 'intelligent drum and bass', but is influenced by jazz, hip hop, dub, funk and soul. Ladi 6 also returns for the third collaboration in as many albums.

Soulstice has spawned some of the group's most popular songs, such as fan favourites "Electric Dream", and "Bring Change", "New Day Come" and "One" have all become staples of their live shows, as shown in their live album release.

== Track listing ==
1. New Day Come: 7:15
2. In The Rain (feat. Ladi6): 5:31
3. Earth: 6:09
4. Bring Change: 5:11
5. Electric Dream: 5:40
6. Equinox: 2:43
7. Southern Lights (feat. KP): 4:14
8. Heat Of The Moment (feat. Kye): 5:40
9. Stryka: 6:14
10. One: 7:07
11. The Ride: 6:46
12. Summer Haze: 6:58
