= Concord Dawn =

New Zealand drum and bass group

- Origin: Auckland, New Zealand
- Genre: Drum and Bass
- Years active: 1998–2023
- Label: Uprising
- Members: Matt Harvey (1998–2023)
- Past members: Evan Short (1998–2010)

Concord Dawn was (until 2023) a New Zealand Drum and Bass group that started in mid-1999, consisting of Matt Harvey (aka Matty C). Until 2010, Evan Short was one half of the group. They were courted by local electronic music label Kog Transmissions and released their first album, Concord Dawn, in July 2000.

== History ==
After touring their first album throughout New Zealand, they released their second album Disturbance in April 2001 and received "Best Electronic Album" and "Best Independent Release" at the 2001 bNet Music Awards. Following this they started working on their third album: Uprising. Tracks like "Morning Light" and "Don't Tell Me" found very high international acclaim well before the album's release. Uprising was released in New Zealand in September 2003 and reached gold sales status in three months, going on to eventually reach platinum sales in New Zealand.

Concord Dawn have become established internationally and their catalogue is distributed worldwide. They went off on a world tour, travelling through the United States, Canada, Europe, Asia and Australia. At the 2003 bNet music awards, the song "Morning Light" won "Best Song" and "Most Radio Play". At the 2004 bNet music awards, Uprising received "Best Album" and "Best Electronic Release". Concord Dawn were nominated for "Best Electronic Act" at the 2004 New Zealand music awards.

Work on their long-awaited fourth album was completed in early 2005 and was titled Chaos by Design by the two to express the album's musically eclectic nature. The album and singles won critical acclaim worldwide with various tracks off the albums being signed to some big and respected drum and bass labels such as Metalheadz, Ram Records and Hospital Records.

Concord Dawn were nominated for "Best Tech DJ", "Best International Act" and "Best Producer" at the 2009 UK Drum and Bass Awards. Chaos by Design achieved Gold sales status in New Zealand. Concord Dawn have two of the top 20 selling records of all time at www.chemical-records.co.uk, "Dont Tell Me" and "Morning Light", which were released on Timeless Records.

Concord Dawn's live sets are well regarded as encompassing the full spectrum of drum and bass music, and this has seen constant tours and performances in Europe, Russia, Australasia, Asia and North America since the turn of the century.

Concord Dawn now only features member Matt Harvey, Evan Short left the group for reasons unknown. Following after his departure was The Enemy Within LP in 2010. The first solo Concord Dawn EP entitled The Race to Zero EP was released in 2011 (also titled The Race To Zero Volume 1 on 5 September 2011). The Wipeout EP featuring New Zealand's TREi was released in early 2012

2012's Air Chrysalis LP, released for free via the artists Facebook and SoundCloud pages, won "Best Electronica LP' at the 2012 RIANZ New Zealand Music Awards.

Concord Dawn released the single "Moonlighting" with Tali on 25 June 2014.

By the end of 2023, the original Duo, consisting of Matt Harvey and Evan Short (who returned to join Harvey just for a series or shows, after leaving Concord Dawn in 2010) gave a series of last shows in their home country, New Zealand and wrap it up for good.

The Last Hurrah Tour took place between November and December 2023. The dates of the shows were the following:

Concord Dawn - The Last Hurrah Tour

Thursday 16th November, 2023 - Hide, Christchurch

Friday 8th December, 2023 - The Mothership, Auckland

Saturday 9th December, 2023 - Meow, Wellington

== Discography ==
=== Albums ===
Year	Title	Details	Peak chart positions	Certifications
Year	Title	Details	NZ	Certifications
2000	Concord Dawn	Label: Kog Transmissions, Low Profile; Catalogue: KOG1015, LOW001	—	
2001	Disturbance	Label: Kog Transmissions, Low Profile; Catalogue: KOG1021, LOW006	—	
2003	Uprising	Released: 16 June 2003; Label: Uprising Records; Catalogue: RISE001CD	8	NZ: Platinum
2006	Chaos by Design	Released: 7 August 2006; Label: Uprising Records; Catalogue: RISE009CD	7	NZ: Gold
2010	The Enemy Within	Released: 19 September 2010; Label: Uprising Records; Catalogue: RISECD03	13	
2012	Air Chrysalis	Released: 16 July 2012; Self-Released	—	
"—" denotes a recording that did not chart or was not released in that territory.

=== EPs ===
Year	Title	Details	Peak chart positions
Year	Title	Details	NZ
2003	Uprising 33	Released: 25 November 2003; Label: Uprising Records	—
2011	The Race to Zero	Released: 5 September 2011; Label: Uprising Records	—
2012	Wipeout	Released: 17 February 2012; Label: Uprising Records	—
2013	Numbers Will Kill Us All	Released: 24 June 2013; Self-Released	—
2014	The Fuzz	Released: 8 December 2014; Label: Uprising Records	—
2015	Gumshoe	Released: 20 April 2015; Label: Uprising Records	—
"—" denotes a recording that did not chart or was not released in that territory.

=== Non-album tracks ===
Date	Album	Title	Label	Artist	Catalog number
2002	In2Deep	"Bad Bones"	Deep Needs Audio (DNA)	Various	DNACD02
2004	...What Price Will You Pay? Vol.1	"Take Me Away" (original mix)	Commercial Suicide	Klute	SUICIDE CD002
2004	The Dungeonmaster's Guide	"Take Me Away" (Ill Skillz remix)	Human Imprint Recordings	Dieselboy	HUMA8012
2016	Monument EP	"Curtains (featuring Concord Dawn)"	Horizons Music	Need for mirrors	HZN088
