= Radio Control 99.4FM =

- Palmerston North; New Zealand
- Frequency: 99.4 MHz

Programming
- Format: Student radio
- Affiliations: Student Radio Network

History
- First air date: 1981; 45 years ago (as Radio Massey)
- Former call signs: 2XM
- Former names: Masskeradio, Radio Massey
- Former frequencies: 92 MHz, 93 MHz

Technical information
- ERP: 22dBW

Links
- Webcast: Listen
- Website: www.radiocontrol.org.nz

Radio Control 99.4FM, commonly known as Radio Control, RC or RadCon, is a New Zealand student radio station, operating from Massey University's Manawatū Campus in Palmerston North. The station primarily plays alternative music.

The station, first called Masskeradio, obtained their first license in 1980, becoming the first commercial student radio station in New Zealand. The station was first broadcast during student Orientation in 1980 on 1584 kHz AM, from a caravan parked on-campus and using equipment lent to it from the Army and Desert Radio (a telethon).

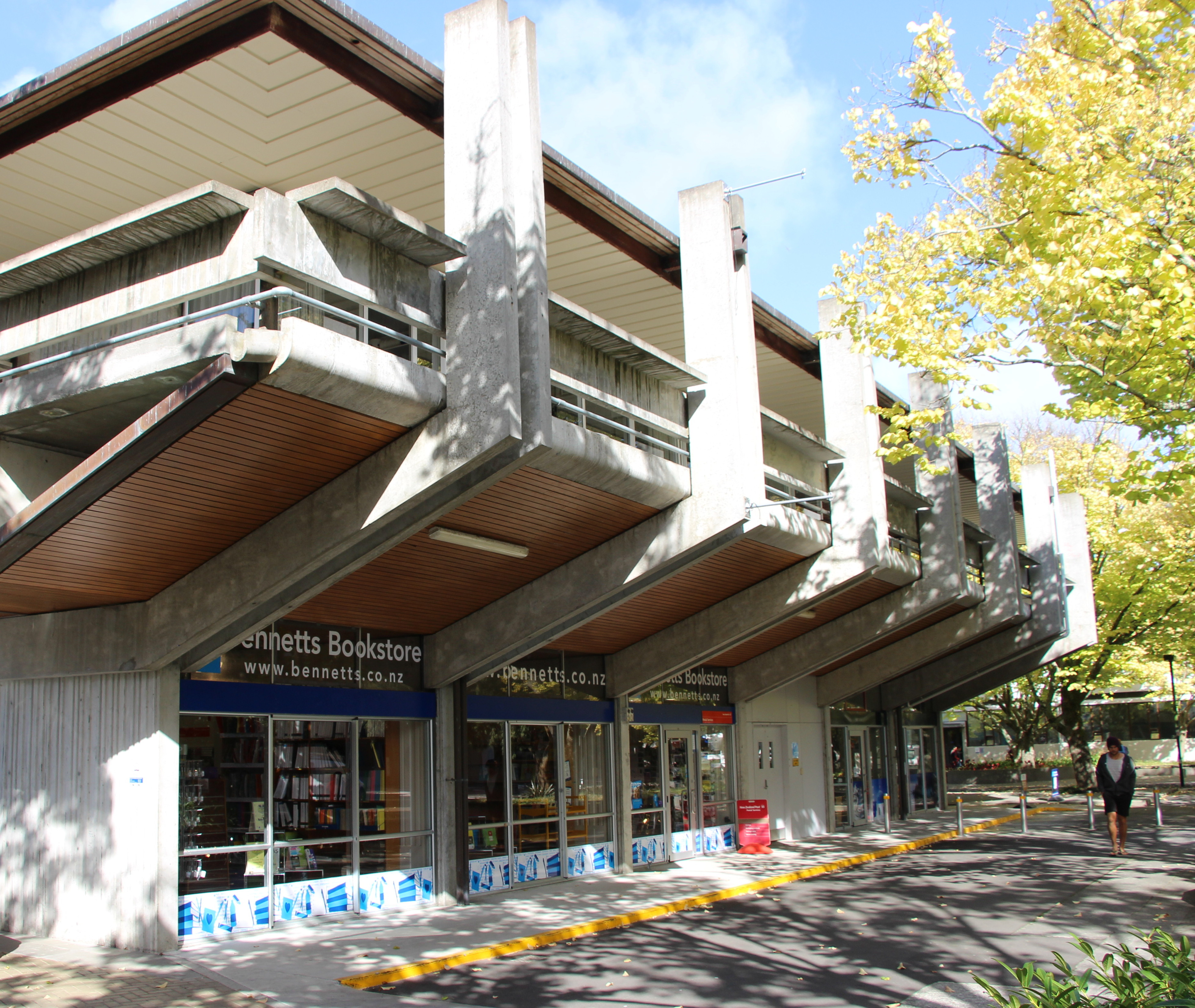
Radio Control's studio is within the student centre building.

The station became Radio Massey in 1981, and received a permanent studio in the campus Student Centre Building. During 1982, the station broadcast on 1269 kHz AM. They were granted an FM license that year, being the fourth student radio to receive one. Initially, this was not a commercial license, so the station was restricted to playing only 50% copyrighted music, with the rest being talk-back and non-copyrighted material. This lasted a few days until an appeal was won by the station. The station was subject to an injunction with the Wellington High Court from the local station 2XS, which had established itself in 1981 as an AM station. 2XS also wanted an FM license, and feared that the new student station's FM broadcast would split the local audience for alternative music. However, Radio Massey returned to an AM license in 1983. During that year, the station was involved in organising concerts in Palmerston North, featuring acts such as The Skeptics and The Birthday Party. Radio Massey operated under that name until the late 1990s.

Jeremy Corbett and Steven Joyce were presenters on the station during the 1980s. Joyce became programme manager in 1984.

Radio Control often partners with Palmerston North music venue The Stomach to record live music sets. Artists have included Anthonie Tonnon, Don McGlashan, and DARTZ.

Radio Control will host the 2025 Aotearoa Alternative Awards on the 8th of November 2025.

== See also ==
- Radio in New Zealand
