= Futureproof (album) =

Studio album by Pitch Black
- Released: 19 August 1998
- Genre: Electronica, dubtronica, downtempo
- Length: 104:31
- Label: Kog Transmissions

Pitch Black chronology
Futureproof (1998)	Electronomicon (2000)

Futureproof is the debut album released in 1998 by New Zealand electronica duo, Pitch Black.

== Track listing ==
Disc One

1. "The Gatherer" – 6:37
2. "Speech" – 8:40
3. "They Are Among Us" – 9:32
4. "Soliton" – 11:57
5. "The Gatherer (Live)" – 9:17
6. "Altered State" – 7:58
7. "Alternate State" – 6:47

Disc Two

1. "Melt (Dub Obscura Mix)" – 6:54
2. "Speech (White Amolitude Mix)" – 5:50
3. "Soliton (Ton A' Sol Mix)" – 5:57
4. "Speech (Freedom Of Speech Mix)" – 8:00
5. "Melt (Mr Babbit Mix)" – 7:30
6. "Speech (Speechless Mix)" – 9:32
