= Killervision =

Studio album by Salmonella Dub
- Released: 13 May 1999
- Label: EMI

Salmonella Dub chronology
Calming of the Drunken Monkey (1997)	Killervision (1999)	Dub Tomfoolery (re-release) (2000)

Professional ratings
Review scores
Source	Rating
Allmusic	4/5 stars

Killervision is the third studio album by New Zealand dub group, Salmonella Dub released in 1999.

The album received several awards at the 1999 New Zealand Music Awards.

== Track listing ==
1. "Dragon"
2. "For The Love of It"
3. "Drifting"
4. "Crazy 80's"
5. "Peyote Dub"
6. "Justice"
7. "Johnny"
8. "No Worries 2000"
9. "Savage"
10. "Kaikoura Rim"

== Bonus CD ==
1. "For The Love Of It - (David Harrow mix)"
2. "For The Love Of It - (Pitchblack version)"
3. "For The Love Of It - (Mad Professor version)"
4. "Drifting - Side By Side - (James Hardway remix)"
5. "Drifting - We go e go he go boy o mix - (The Pupil)"
6. "Johnny - Ipcress mix (Paddy Free)"
7. "Johnny - (Dubmariner mix)"
8. "Johnny - (DLT mix)"
9. "Johnny - (Rockwood mix)"
