= Uprising Records (New Zealand) =

Record label

- Founded: 2004
- Founder: Matt Harvey, Evan Short
- Genre: Drum and bass
- Country of origin: New Zealand
- Location: Auckland, North Island
- Official website: Concord-Dawn.co.nz

Uprising Records is a record label formed in 2004 by Matt Harvey and Evan Short of drum and bass band Concord Dawn. The label was originally created for releases by Concord Dawn, but has since made releases for several other drum and bass acts, including Australian band Pendulum and Norwegian duo Rawthang.

== Artists ==
The following artists have had at least one release with Uprising Records.

- Bulletproof (2007–present)
- Concord Dawn (2004–present)
- Pacific (2006)
- Pendulum (2004)
- Rawthang (2005)
- State of Mind (2006–present)
