= Salmonella Dub =

New Zealand-based band

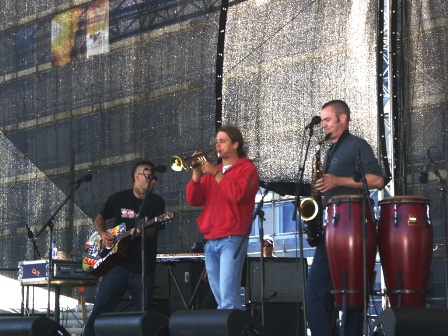
Salmonella Dub in 2006

Salmonella Dub is a dub/drum n bass/reggae/roots band from New Zealand. The band was formed in 1992 by Andrew Penman, Dave Deakins, and Mark Tyler. The band has toured extensively throughout New Zealand, Australia, the United Kingdom, and Ireland. Along with other 1990s bands including Hallelujah Picassos and Supergroove, the 'Dubsters' have been called pioneers of a unique Pacific style of dub/drum 'n' bass/reggae/hip hop and groove-based rock containing elements of the Polynesian hip hop style known as Urban Pasifika. The band helped foster and tour acts like Fat Freddy’s Drop, Shapeshifter, Cornerstone Roots, Kora, and Trinity Roots, as well as the new wave of Australian acts like Budspells, Rastawookie, King Tide and Red Eyes. Salmonella Dub helped break new ground in an Australasian alternative music scene which was dominated through most of the 1990s by straight guitar rock and electronic dance music.

== History ==
Salmonella Dub was formed in 1992 in Christchurch by Andrew Penman (guitar), David Deakins (drums), and Mark Tyler (bass). They played their first gig in January 1993 at the Westport racecourse tearooms, to an audience of 64 people. The band's name was a reference to the 'bad-taste' covers they performed in a dub-reggae style. In 1996, Penman described the band's style as "bastardised dub".

Conan Wilcox (saxophone/percussion) and Peter Wood (trumpet/keyboard) joined the band in 1994, and the band released its debut CD Salmonella Dub in November 1994. Wood left the band in mid-1996. MC Tiki Taane had begun mixing the group's live sets in 1996, and later joined the band onstage to rap, sing, and play guitar. After developing a profile with the band, Taane embarked on a solo career in 2007. Conan Wilcox also left the band in 2007. Pete Wood worked with the group again in 2007 after the departure of Tiki Taane and Conan Wilcox.

Other guest or collaborative artists have included Paddy Free (of Pitch Black) who produced the album Freak Controller and performed with the band, and guests Whirimako Black, Hirini Melbourne, Richard Nunns and MC Mana.

In 1999, the band's album Killervision won eight bNet awards. It went platinum (15,000 copies sold) in May 2000, and later went double platinum. It was released in five countries.

In 2002, the group toured Australia and Europe and set up a new recording studio at Kaikōura. Their album Inside the Dub Plates won three awards, including 'Top Group', at the New Zealand Music Awards. Inside the Dub Plates was remixed and released in August 2002 as Outside the Dub Plates, partially funded by a $50,000 Phase 4 recording grant from NZ On Air, a government funding agency. Outside the Dub Plates won 'Best Dance Album' at the 2003 New Zealand Music Awards, and best downbeat release at the 2003 bNet Awards, where winners are chosen by public voting.

In February 2008, Salmonella Dub and the New Zealand Symphony Orchestra collaborated for the Feel The Seasons Change tour of New Zealand with shows performed in Auckland, Wellington, Christchurch, and Nelson. The Feel The Seasons Change project combined Salmonella Dub’s contemporary music and production values with elements of Te Reo Māori, taonga pūoro (traditional Maori instruments) and the New Zealand Symphony Orchestra's classical music tradition. A New Zealand Herald reviewer stated "United by background images of our geography and history, the omnipresent birdsong of Richard Nunns on traditional Maori instruments, and the outstanding vocals of jazz-blues singer Whirimako Black, the collaboration was certainly intriguing if [only] for its sheer scale. Between songs, conductor Hamish McKeich was careful not to trip over his players, squeezed onto two-thirds of the stage; Salmonella Dub looked oddly well-behaved and vulnerable standing next to them." At the New Zealand Radio Awards in 2009, Radio New Zealand became the first non-commercial radio station to win the Supreme Award including Best Technical Production, Studio, or Outside Broadcast Recording with Feel the Seasons Change – Live with the NZSO.

The band released the single Same Home Town in 2013 in honour of their 20th birthday. The single is dedicated to the Dux de Lux, the early Christchurch venue for the band.

In 2017 the Sunday Star Times reported that the band was to be given a Legacy Award at the New Zealand Music Awards. They were invited to choose a band or performer who had influenced them who would perform at the awards ceremony. Salmonella Dub named Wellington band Beat Rhythm Fashion but the organisers rejected their choice, saying that it was too obscure for television. In response, Salmonella Dub declined the offer of entry to the New Zealand Music Hall of Fame. Nino Birch, frontman of Beat Rhythm Fashion, said that he was honoured to have been cited by Salmonella Dub. Penman stated: "The producer thought that Beat Rhythm Fashion was too obscure and would confuse the audience and take too much work to explain to them. I said 'if that's the case I don't want to be there', then I didn't hear anything back." He went on: "After it all went to custard I had a look at the NZ Hall of Fame and I went 'hang on, there's no Split Enz, no Skeptics either. Why haven't Upper Hutt Posse been acknowledged?'" He said "I'd feel wrong accepting it with that not being acknowledged, it doesn't work for me."

For many years, the band has been connected to the small north Canterbury town of Kaikōura, where they have their studio, and where they helped found the Kaikoura Roots festival. The band formed a company, Dub Conspiracy, which Penman sees as a production house. It releases records by other people, helps to organise tours and the Kaikoura Roots Festival and functions as a support for other roots bands.

== Discography ==
=== Studio albums ===
List of albums, with selected details and chart positions
Title	Album details	Peak chart positions	
Title	Album details	NZ	AUS
Salmonella Dub	Released: 1994; Label: Curious George	—	—
Calming of the Drunken Monkey	Released: 6 November 1997	—	—
Killervision	Released: 13 May 1999	7	—
Inside the Dub Plates	Released: 10 August 2001	1	—
Outside the Dub Plates	Released: 2002; Label: EMI	14	—
Salmonella Dub (re-release)	Released: 23 March 2004	—	—
One Drop East	Released: 25 November 2004	1	84
Mercy	Released: 25 November 2004	35	—
Heal Me	Released: 3 September 2007	2	93
Freak Controller	Released: 20 November 2009	26	—
Freak Controller (Madness release)	Released: 18 October 2010	—	—
Commercial Grates	Released: 18 January 2018	—	—
"—" denotes releases that did not chart

=== EPs ===
Year	Details
1995	Dub Tomfoolery: Label: Curious Recordings
1996	THC Winter: Label: Curious Recordings
2000	Dub Tomfoolery: Release date: 23 March 2000; Label: EMI
2000	Colonial Dubs: Release date: 16 October 2000; Label: EMI
2009	Freak Local: Release date: 29 June 2009; Label: EMI

=== Other albums ===
Release date	Title	Label	Charted
Live albums
22 September 2008	Feel the Seasons Change – Live with the NZSO	Virgin Records	19
Remix albums
28 March 2006	Remixes and Radio Cuts	EMI	34

=== Singles ===
Year	Title	Peak chart positions	Album
Year	Title	NZ	Album
1998	"Cols Fish"	—	Calming of the Drunken Monkey
1999	"For the Love of It"	12	Killervision
1999	"Drifting"	—	Killervision
1999	"Johnny"	34	Killervision
2001	"Love Your Ways"	11	Inside the Dub Plates
2001	"Problems"	—	Inside the Dub Plates
2001	"Push On Thru"	—	Inside the Dub Plates
2001	"Tha Bromley East Roller"	—	Inside the Dub Plates
2003	"Nu Steppa"	—	One Drop East
2004	"Dancehall Girl"	34	One Drop East
2007	"Love Sunshine and Happiness"	—	Heal Me
2009	"Freak Local"	—	Freak Controller
"—" denotes a recording that did not chart or was not released in that territory.

=== DVDs ===
Date of release	Title	Label	Certification
2003	Salmonella Dub DVD	EMI	-
