= Pitch Black (band) =

New Zealand electronica duo

- Origin: Auckland, New Zealand
- Genres: Electronica
- Years active: 1996–present
- Labels: Kog Transmissions, Dubmission, Waveform, Wakyo, Remote
- Members: Michael Hodgson; Paddy Free
- Website: https://www.pitchblacknz.com/

Pitch Black is a New Zealand electronica duo from Auckland.

== History ==
Mike and Paddy met in 1996. Since then they have released six albums, four remix albums and been on six world tours.

Their debut album, Futureproof, released in August 1998, rose to the top of the New Zealand electronic charts, despite no marketing or advertising. Their second album, Electronomicon, followed in September 2000, and led to a 30-date tour of New Zealand and Australia. Both albums spawned remix projects, featuring mixes by local bands International Observer, Epsilon-Blue and Downtown Brown.

Their third album, Ape to Angel, released in New Zealand on 4 October 2004, gained critical acclaim. The "Ape to Angel" tour was the biggest to date, with 42 shows across the world, including their debut performances in United States. The remixes of this came out in New Zealand and Australia under the name "Halfway: between Ape and Angel" and in Europe and America as "Frequencies Fall".

Their fourth studio album was "Rude Mechanicals", released in 2007: it came out on the band's own label, Remote Recordings, in Australia and New Zealand; on the Wakyo label in Japan; and on Dubmission Records elsewhere in the world. The remixes of this album came out as "Rhythm, Sound and Movement" in May 2009.

On June 13, 2011, they released "Rarities + Remixes", a collection of their remixes of other artists plus three original tracks.

The fifth Pitch Black record "Filtered Senses" came out on 2 September 2016, and was followed by a remix collection, "Invisible Circuits", on 7 July 2017.

Their sixth studio album "Third Light" was released on 13 September 2019 and followed with a tour of New Zealand in October and Europe in November. A remix collection, "The Light Within", dropped on 10 July 2020.

On March 18, 2022, they released "Mixes + Mavericks", a collection of their remixes of other artists plus two live tracks and two studio anomalies.

Pitch Black songs have been used on a variety of international film and media, such as Whale Rider and CSI: Miami. Also they have worked with Metia Interactive's Cube game for the PlayStation Portable, designing sound, and contributing music.

== Discography ==
Date of Release	Title	Label	Chart	Certification	Catalog Number
Albums
1998	Futureproof		–	–	
1999	Dub Obscura		–	–	
2000	Electronomicon		–	–	
2001	Electric Earth & Other Elements: Remixes		–	–	
2004	Ape to Angel		–	–	
2005	Halfway: Between Ape and Angel		–	–	
2006	Frequencies Fall		–	–	
2007	Rude Mechanicals		–	–	
2009	Rhythm, Sound and Movement		–	–	
2016	Filtered Senses				
2017	Invisible Circuits				
2019	Third Light				
2020	The Light Within				
2024	Echoes of The Night				
EPs
2002	Electric Earth		–	–	
2003	Flex		–	–	

=== Featured appearances ===
The group have appeared on several compilations and soundtracks since their inception onto the New Zealand music scene. The following is a list of these albums that have featured tracks by Pitch Black:

- 1999 – The Gathering (record label unknown) – "Alternate State"
- 2000 – The Gathering 2000 (record label unknown) – "Melt"
- 2001 – Loop 13 CD.08 (Loop Recordings) – "Soliton"
- 2001 – Loop Select 002 (Loop Recordings) – "Unadrummer" (Sunshine Sound System Remix) (remixed by Downtown Brown)
- 2001 – Snakeskin OST (Mana Music) – "Data Diviner"
- 2001 – The Gathering 3 (Virgin Records) – "Reptile Room"
- 2002 – Loop 003 (Loop Recordings) – "Electric Earth" (DC Mix)
- 2002 – The Gathering 2002 (Loop Recordings) – "Unadrummer" (Sunshine Sound System Remix) (remixed by Downtown Brown)
- 2002 – The Green Room 001 (Loop Recordings) – "Speech" (White Amplitude Mix) (remixed by International Observer)
- 2004 – The Green Room 003 (Loop Recordings) – "Lost in Translation"
- 2005 – Kaikoura Roots Festival 2005 (Dub Conspiracy) – "Elements Turn"
- 2006 – TFM 2006 (Living Works Trust) – "Lost in Translation"
