= 2011 New Zealand Music Awards =

Annual New Zealand music awards ceremony

- Awarded for: Excellence in New Zealand music
- Sponsored by: Vodafone
- Date: 3 November 2011
- Location: Vector Arena, Auckland
- Country: New Zealand
- Hosted by: Shannon Ryan and Ben Boyce
- Reward: Tui award trophy
- Website: http://www.nzmusicawards.co.nz

Television/radio coverage
- Network: Four

The 2011 New Zealand Music Awards was the 45th holding of the annual ceremony featuring awards for musical artists based in or originating from New Zealand. Finalists for the three technical awards were announced in August 2011 with winners announced on 7 September, the date on which finalists for 16 'non-technical' categories were revealed. Five 'non-technical' awards were presented without a group of finalists being selected. The awards ceremony took place on 3 November 2011 at Vector Arena, Auckland – this was later in the year than previous ceremonies, due to the 2011 Rugby World Cup being held in New Zealand in September and October. The ceremony was hosted by television presenter Shannon Ryan and comedian Ben Boyce and broadcast live on television channel Four.

The Naked and Famous won the most awards, with seven, including Album of the Year, Single of the Year and two technical awards. The band's nine nominations made it the most-nominated artist. Brooke Fraser won five awards, including Highest selling New Zealand Single and Highest selling New Zealand Album. Kimbra was awarded the Critics' Choice Prize, while Dragon won the Legacy Award, and so was inducted into the New Zealand Music Hall of Fame. The Naked and Famous, Ladi6, Fraser, Six60, Avalanche City, Tiki Taane and Supergroove all performed at the awards ceremony.

== Nominees and winners ==
Winners are listed first and highlighted in boldface.

Key
† – Non-technical award
‡ – Technical award

Album of the Year†	Single of the Year†
Sponsored by Russian Standard Vodka: **The Naked and Famous – Passive Me, Aggressive You**; Ladi6 – The Liberation Of...; Brooke Fraser – Flags; Avalanche City – Our New Life Above The Ground; David Dallas – The Rose Tint	Sponsored by Vodafone: **The Naked and Famous – "Young Blood"**; Avalanche City – "Love Love Love"; Ladi6 – "Like Water"; Brooke Fraser – Something in the Water"; Six60 – "Rise Up 2.0"
Best Group†	Breakthrough Artist of the Year†
Sponsored by Four: **The Naked and Famous – Passive Me, Aggressive You**; Shihad – Ignite; Kids of 88 – Sugarpills	Sponsored by Pacific Blue Airlines: **The Naked and Famous – Passive Me, Aggressive You**; Six60 – Rise Up 2.0; Avalanche City – Our New Life Above The Ground
Best Male Solo Artist†	Best Female Solo Artist†
**Tiki Taane – In the World of Light**; David Dallas – The Rose Tint; Stan Walker – From the Inside Out	**Ladi6 – The Liberation Of...**; Brooke Fraser – Flags; Julia Deans – Modern Fables
Best Rock Album†	Best Pop Album†
Sponsored by PPNZ: **Shihad – Ignite**; Cairo Knife Fight – Cairo Knife Fight; Beastwars – Beastwars	Sponsored by The Edge: **Brooke Fraser – Flags**; Kids of 88 – Sugarpills; Julia Deans – Modern Fables
Best Urban / Hip Hop Album†	Best Roots Album†
Sponsored by Serato: **Ladi6 – The Liberation Of...**; David Dallas – The Rose Tint; PNC – Man on Wire	**TrinityRoots – Music is Choice**; House of Shem – Island Vibration; Katchafire – On the Road Again
Best Alternative Album†	Best Māori Album†
**The Naked and Famous – Passive Me, Aggressive You**; Street Chant – Means; Die! Die! Die! – Form	**Tiki Taane – In the World of Light**; Miss Black – Black Light; Wai – Ora
Best Music Video†	Best Electronica Album†
Sponsored by NZ On Air: **Special Problems – "Punching in a Dream" (The Naked and Famous)**; Special Problems – "Broken Machine" (Zowie); Faye McNeil – "Like Water" (Ladi6)	**Tiki Taane – In the World of Light**; State of Mind – Nil By Ear; Concord Dawn – The Enemy Within
Best Gospel / Christian Album†	Best Classical Album†
**Parachute Band – Love Without Measure**; The Ember Days – Finger Painting EP; Juliagrace– Beautiful Survivor	**New Zealand String Quartet – Notes from a Journey**; John Psathas – Helix; Flight – Flight
Peoples' Choice Award†	Critics' Choice Prize†
Sponsored by Vodafone: **Brooke Fraser**; Ladi6; The Naked and Famous; Six60; Stan Walker	Sponsored by Gravity Coffee: **Kimbra**; The Popstrangers; The Unfaithful Ways
Highest selling New Zealand Single†	Highest selling New Zealand Album†
No finalists were announced in this category.: **Brooke Fraser – "Something in the Water"**	No finalists were announced in this category.: **Brooke Fraser – Flags**
Radio Airplay Record of the Year†	International Achievement Award†
No finalists were announced in this category. Sponsored by New Zealand On Air: **Stan Walker – "Choose You"**	No finalists were announced in this category.: **Brooke Fraser**
Legacy Award†	Best Album Cover‡
No finalists were announced in this category. Sponsored by The New Zealand Herald: **Dragon**	**Nick Keller – Beastwars (Beastwars)**; Angela Keoghan – The Dusty Dream Hole (Bannerman); Baly Gaudin and Thomas Young – Tommy Ill (Tommy Ill)
Best Engineer‡	Best Producer‡
Sponsored by the Music and Audio Institute of New Zealand (MAINZ): **Thom Powers, Aaron Short and Olly Harmer – Passive Me, Aggressive You (The Naked and Famous)**; Neil Baldock – Cairo Knife Fight (Cairo Knife Fight); Olly Harmer – Arctic Tales Divide (Andrew Keoghan)	Sponsored by the Music and Audio Institute of New Zealand (MAINZ): **Thom Powers and Aaron Short – Passive Me, Aggressive You (The Naked and Famous)**; Brooke Fraser – Flags (Brooke Fraser); Nick Roughan and Die! Die! Die! – Form (Die! Die! Die!)

== Presenters and performers ==
=== Performers ===
Performers at the ceremony:

- The Naked and Famous – "Young Blood"
- Ladi6 – "Bang Bang"
- Brooke Fraser – "Something in the Water"
- Six60 – "Rise Up"
- Avalanche City – "Love Love Love"
- Tiki Taane – "Freedom to Sing"
- Supergroove – "Rain" (Dragon tribute)
