= 2001 in New Zealand =

- Decades: 1980s; 1990s; 2000s; 2010s; 2020s
- See also: History of New Zealand; List of years in New Zealand; Timeline of New Zealand history

The following lists events that happened during 2001 in New Zealand.

== Population ==
- Estimated population as of 31 December: 3,916,200.
- Increase since 31 December 2000: 43,100 (1.11%).
- Males per 100 Females: 96.2.

== Incumbents ==
=== Regal and viceregal ===
- Head of State – Elizabeth II
- Governor-General – The Rt Hon. Sir Michael Hardie Boys GNZM, GCMG, QSO followed by The Hon Dame Silvia Cartwright PCNZM, DBE, QSO

=== Government ===
The 46th New Zealand Parliament continued. Government was The Labour Party led by Helen Clark, in coalition with Alliance, led by Jim Anderton.

- Speaker of the House – Jonathan Hunt
- Prime Minister – Helen Clark
- Deputy Prime Minister – Jim Anderton
- Minister of Finance – Michael Cullen
- Minister of Foreign Affairs – Phil Goff
- Chief Justice — Sian Elias

=== Opposition leaders ===
See: Category:Parliament of New Zealand, New Zealand elections

- National – Jenny Shipley then Bill English (Leader of the Opposition)
- Greens – Jeanette Fitzsimons and Rod Donald
- Act – Richard Prebble
- New Zealand First – Winston Peters
- Labour – Helen Clark
- Progressives – Jim Anderton
- United Future – Peter Dunne

=== Main centre leaders ===
- Mayor of Auckland – Christine Fletcher then John Banks
- Mayor of Hamilton – Russ Rimmington then David Braithwaite
- Mayor of Wellington – Mark Blumsky then Kerry Prendergast
- Mayor of Christchurch – Garry Moore
- Mayor of Dunedin – Sukhi Turner

== Events ==
- New Zealand establishes an embassy in Brasília, Brazil.
- 21 August – A magnitude 7.1 earthquake strikes 390 kilometres north-east of Gisborne.
- August – The newspaper archive Papers Past is launched.

== Arts and literature ==
- Jo Randerson wins the Robert Burns Fellowship.
- Montana New Zealand Book Awards:
  - Montana Medal: Michael King, Wrestling with the Angel: A Life of Janet Frame
  - Deutz Medal: Lloyd Jones, The Book of Fame
  - Reader's Choice: Michael King, Wrestling with the Angel: A Life of Janet Frame
  - First Book Awards
    - Fiction: Karyn Hay, Emerald Budgies
    - Poetry: Stephanie de Montalk, Animals Indoors
    - Non-Fiction: Paul Tapsell, Pukaki: A Comet Returns

See 2001 in art, 2001 in literature, Category:2001 books

=== Music ===
==== New Zealand Music Awards ====
Two original categories were retired 'Most Promising Male Vocalist' and 'Most Promising Female Vocalist' and the 'Film Soundtrack/Cast Recording/Compilation' category introduced the year before was reduced to be compilations only. Winners are shown first with nominees underneath.

- Album of the Year: Zed – Silencer
  - Dave Dobbyn – Hopetown
  - Fur Patrol – Pet
  - Tadpole – The Buddhafinger'
  - Tim Finn / Dave Dobbyn / Bic Runga – Together in Concert: Live
- Single of the Year: Fur Patrol – Lydia
  - Eye TV – "One Day Ahead"
  - Shihad – Pacifier
  - Tadpole – Alright
  - Zed – Renegade Fighter
- Top Group: Zed – Silencer
  - Tadpole – The Buddhafinger
  - Shihad – Pacifier
- Best New Act: Betchadupa
  - Splitter
  - Dan Sperber & Luke Casey
- Top Male Vocalist: Nathan King (Zed)
  - Jon Toogood (Shihad)
  - Dave Dobbyn
- Top Female Vocalist: Julia Deans (Fur Patrol)
  - Renee Brennan (Tadpole)
  - Libby Huirua
- Best Folk Album: Lothlorien – Greenwood Side
  - Run The Cutter – Passing Time
  - The Jews Brothers Band – My Yiddish Swing
- Best Jazz Album: The Rodger Fox Big Band – Ain't That The Truth
  - Erna Ferry – Devil May Care
  - Chris Mason Bentley Group – Karakia
- Best Classical Album: Strike – New Zealand Percussion Music
  - Michael Houston – Elusive Dreams: NZ Piano Music
  - New Zealand String Quartet – Gareth Farr: Owhiro
- Best Country Album: no award
- Best Gospel Album: The Parachute Band – Love
  - Solace – Solace
  - Invasion Band – Nga Mea Katoa
- Best Mana Maori Album: Wai – Wai 100%
  - Ruia & Ranea – Whare Maori
  - Big Belly Woman – Dance with the Wind
- Best Mana Reo Album: Whirimako Black -Shrouded in The Mist / Hinepukohurangi
  - Ruia & Ranea – Whare Maori
  - Wai – Wai 100%
- Best Children's Album: Liam Ryan & Carol Storey – The Present
  - Kids Music Company Singers – On A High Note
  - John Phillips – The Lost Property Box
- Best Compilation: Strawpeople – The Best of 1990–2000
  - HLAH – Blood on the Honky Tonk Floor
  - Various – Algorhythm 2
- Best Songwriter: Julia Deans – Lydia (Fur Patrol)
  - Aaron Takona – Calling On (Weta)

Nathan King – Renegade Fighter (Zed)

- Best Producer: Dave Long – Pet (Fur Patrol)
  - Malcolm Welsford – The Buddhafinger (Tadpole)
  - Paul Casserly & Joost Langeveld – No New Messages (Strawpeople)
- Best Engineer: Sam Gibson – Betchadupa EP (Betchadupa)
  - Malcolm Welsford – The Buddhafinger (Tadpole)
  - Mike Gibson – Pet (Fur Patrol)
- Best Video: Alex Sutherland & Michael Lonsdale – Touchdown (The Stereobus)
  - Greg Page – "One Day Ahead" (Eye TV)
  - Wade Shotter & Jamie Dower – Silent Film (Augustino)
- Best Cover: Wayne Conway – Hopetown (Dave Dobbyn)
  - Monique Facon – The Buddhafinger (Tadpole)
  - Andrew B White & Jade Weaver – Pet (Fur Patrol)
- New Zealand Radio Programmer Award: Rodger Clamp – More FM Auckland & Channel Z
  - Andi Dawkins – More FM Christchurch and Dunedin
  - Brad King – The Rock Network
- Outstanding International Achievement: Shihad
  - Deep Obsession
  - Salmonella Dub

See: 2001 in music, New Zealand Top 50 Albums of 2001

=== Performing arts ===
- Benny Award presented by the Variety Artists Club of New Zealand to Gray Bartlett MBE.

=== Radio and television ===
See: 2001 in New Zealand television, 2001 in television, List of TVNZ television programming, Category:Television in New Zealand, TV3 (New Zealand), Category:New Zealand television shows, Public broadcasting in New Zealand

=== Film ===
- Crooked Earth
- The Lord of the Rings: The Two Towers

See: Category:2001 film awards, 2001 in film, List of New Zealand feature films, Cinema of New Zealand, Category:2001 films

=== Internet ===
See: NZ Internet History

== Sport ==
- See: 2001 in sports, Category:2001 in sports

=== Athletics ===
- Alastair Snowdon wins his first national title in the men's marathon, clocking 2:22:12 on 3 June in Christchurch, while Anne Clarke claims her first as well in the women's championship (2:47:55).

=== Basketball ===
- The Men's National Basketball League was won by the Waikato Titans who beat the Wellington Saints 112–97 in the final, the Titans having finished top of the league with 15/16 wins.
- The Women’s National Basketball League was won by the Wellington Swish

=== Cricket ===
- New Zealand cricket team
- The State Championship was won by the Wellington Firebirds

=== Golf ===
- New Zealand Open, Category:New Zealand golfers in overseas tournaments.

=== Horse racing ===
==== Harness racing ====
- New Zealand Trotting Cup: Kym's Girl
- Auckland Trotting Cup: Holmes D G

=== Netball ===
- Silver Ferns
- National Bank Cup

=== Rugby league ===
- Bartercard Cup won by the Hibiscus Coast Raiders who were also the minor premiers
- The New Zealand Warriors cane 8th of 14 teams in the NRL, qualifying for the playoffs for the first time. They were knocked out in the first round by minor premiers, Parramatta Eels, 56–12.

=== Rugby union ===
- The Super 12 competition was won by the Brumbies, the first win by a non-NZ team. No NZ teams made the semifinals.
- National Provincial Championship: Division 1, Canterbury, Division 2: Hawke's Bay, Division 3: South Canterbury
- the Bledisloe Cup was won by Australia who won both games.
- the Tri Nations Series was won by Australia, with two wins and a draw. New Zealand came second with two wins.
- The Ranfurly Shield was held by Canterbury all season, with successful defences against Buller 69-3 (in Westport), Sth Canterbury 103-0 (in Timaru), Nelson Bays 67–10, Bay of Plenty 72–3, Wellington 31–29, Taranaki 38–17, Auckland 38–10, Waikato 52–19

=== Shooting ===
- Ballinger Belt – Murray Steele (Malvern)

=== Soccer ===
- The New Zealand National Soccer League was relaunched as a winter competition with 10 teams and finals playoffs. The winner was Napier City Rovers.
- The Chatham Cup is won by University - Mount Wellington who beat Central United 3–3 in the final (5–4 on penalties).

== Births ==
=== January–March ===
- 3 January – Chay Fihaki, rugby union player
- 4 January – Ally Wollaston, racing cyclist
- 11 January – Corey Evans, rugby union player
- 15 January – Tiana Metuarau, netball player
- 17 January – Josh Lord, rugby union player
- 18 January – Kanah Andrews-Nahu, weightlifter
- 25 January - Olivia King, track cyclist
- 28 January – TK Howden, rugby union player
- 1 February – Sean Withy, rugby union player
- 6 February – Peter Vodanovich, racing driver
- 7 February – Maya Hahn, association footballer
- 9 February – Eve Thomas, swimmer
- 14 February
  - Mat Feagai, rugby league player
  - Max Feagai, rugby league player
- 15 February – Reuben Thompson, racing cyclist
- 1 March
  - Griffin Neame, rugby league player
  - Kaitlyn Watts, squash player
- 6 March – Zoi Sadowski-Synnott, snowboarder
- 22 March – Cortez Ratima, rugby union player
- 27 March – Valentina Ivanov, tennis player

=== April–June ===
- 24 April – Simi Sasagi, rugby league player
- 28 April – Ruben Love, rugby union player
- 6 May – Josh Kench, racing cyclist
- 8 May – Edward Osei-Nketia, athlete
- 11 May – Kaleb Ngatoa, racing driver
- 17 May – Rocco Berry, rugby league player
- 23 May – Olivia Shannon, field hockey player
- 24 May – Chante Temara, rugby league player
- 25 May – Corey Kellow, rugby union player
- 7 June – Aidan Morgan, rugby union player
- 11 June – Ben Waine, association footballer
- 14 June – Maggie Jenkins, association footballer
- 15 June
  - Chelsey Edwards, swimmer
  - Tupou Neiufi, swimmer
  - Molly Penfold, cricketer
  - George Stoupe, tennis player
- 20 June – Elys Ventura, tennis player
- 21 June – Connor Bell, discus thrower
- 22 June – Amelia Abbott, association footballer
- 24 June – Logan Currie, racing cyclist
- 26 June – Anna Leat, association footballer

=== July–September ===
- 1 July – Soane Vikena, rugby union player
- 7 July – Gabi Rennie, association footballer
- 12 July – Dominic Gardiner, rugby union player
- 26 July – Gideon Wrampling, rugby union player
- 27 July – Maiakawanakaulani Roos, rugby union player
- 30 July – Dee Heslop, Australian rules footballer
- 3 August – Jacob Ratumaitavuki-Kneepkens, rugby union player
- 16 August – Danielle Aitchison, para-athlete
- 22 August – Jackson Topine, rugby league player
- 4 September – Zach Gallagher, rugby union player
- 10 September – Maddison Weatherall, rugby league player
- 11 September
  - Katie Doar, field hockey player
  - El Segundo, Thoroughbred racehorse
- 17 September – Manu Paea, rugby union player

=== October–December ===
- 11 October – Vaiolini Ekuasi, rugby union player
- 13 October – Ben Harrington, freestyle skier
- 22 October – George Ott, association footballer
- 25 October – Kazuma Kobori, golfer
- 27 October – Alec MacDonald, rugby league player
- 9 November – Jock McKenzie, rugby union player
- 14 November
  - Galleons Sunset, Standardbred racehorse
  - TC Robati, rugby league player
- 23 November – Nico Porteous, freestyle skier
- 29 November – Xcellent, Thoroughbred racehorse
- 1 December – Alice Robinson, alpine skier
- 5 December – Sean Findlay, field hockey player
- 10 December – Sam Sutton, association footballer
- 21 December – Finn Fisher-Black, racing cyclist
- 24 December – Tukimihia Simpkins, rugby league player
- 27 December – Sammie Maxwell, cross-country cyclist

== Deaths ==
=== January–March ===
- 13 January – William Fraser, politician (born 1924)
- 30 January – Jean Coulston, cricketer (born 1934)
- 1 February
  - Roy Dalgarno, artist (born 1910)
  - Sir Robert Mahuta, Māori leader (born 1939)
- 4 February – Sir David Beattie, jurist, Governor-General (1980–85) (born 1924)
- 27 February – Selwyn Toogood, radio and television personality (born 1916)
- 4 March – Herbert Green, obstetrician and gynaecologist (born 1916)

=== April–June ===
- 8 April – Elsie Locke, writer, historian and activist (born 1912)
- 10 April
  - Nyree Dawn Porter, actor (born 1936)
  - Red Anchor, Thoroughbred racehorse (foaled 1981)
- 11 April – Sir Thaddeus McCarthy, jurist (born 1907)
- 20 April – Bert Sutcliffe, cricketer (born 1923)
- 22 April – Trevor de Cleene, politician (born 1933)
- 24 April – Lindsay Daen, sculptor and artist (born 1923)
- 5 May – Roger Hill, World War II naval commander (born 1910)
- 18 May – Sir Alan Westerman, public servant (born 1913)
- 19 May
  - Sir Alan Hellaby, businessman (born 1926)
  - Harry Mahon, rowing coach (born 1942)
- 21 May
  - Erkin Bairam, economics academic (born 1958)
  - Cecil Murgatroyd, non-serious politician (born 1958)
- 2 June – Sir Kenneth Hayr, RAF air marshal (born 1935)
- 6 June – Douglas Lilburn, composer (born 1915)
- 8 June – Duncan MacIntyre, politician (born 1915)
- 13 June – Gordon Christie, politician (born 1914)
- 20 June – Wallace Reyburn, writer (born 1913)
- 30 June – Jack Finlay, rugby union player and coach, soldier (born 1916)

=== July–September ===
- 4 July – Charlie Saxton, rugby union player, cricketer (born 1913)
- 6 July – Derek Freeman, anthropologist (born 1916)
- 8 July – John O'Shea, filmmaker and actor (born 1920)
- 18 July – Ritchie Johnston, cyclist (born 1931)
- 19 July
  - Charles King, cyclist (born 1911)
  - Peter Lucas, rower (born 1933)
- 25 July
  - Levi Borgstrom, wood carver (born 1919)
  - Alan Kirton, agricultural scientist (born 1933)
- 27 July
  - George Cholmondeley-Tapper, motor racing driver (born 1910)
  - Van der Hum, Thoroughbred racehorse (foaled 1971)
- 30 July – Thomas Wells, cricketer and educator (born 1927)
- 5 August
  - Kenelm Digby, lawyer, jurist, public servant (born 1912)
  - Patricia Woodroffe, fencer (born 1926)
- 7 August – Dick Dunn, boxing coach (born 1908)
- 8 August
  - Robin Penhearow, cricketer (born 1941)
  - Peter Sinclair, radio and television personality (born 1938)
- 25 August – Bill Pratney, cyclist and politician (born 1909)
- 1 September – Sir John Robertson, ombudsman (born 1925)
- 31 August – Rex Forrester, hunter and fisherman (born 1928)
- 21 September – Andrew Bradfield, computer programmer (born 1966)
- 23 September – Allen Curnow, poet and journalist (born 1911)
- 28 September – Jack Skeen, rugby union player (born 1928)
- 29 September – Shona McFarlane, artist, journalist and television personality (born 1929)

=== October–December ===
- 8 October – Ray Williams, rugby union player (born 1909)
- 10 October – Norm Wilson, rugby union player and television personality (born 1922)
- 14 October – Sir Philip Adams, diplomat (born 1915)
- 22 October – Bill James, rower (born 1926)
- 26 October – John Platts-Mills, politician (born 1906)
- 30 October − Jack Scott, politician (born 1916)
- 6 November – Peter Newman, economist (born 1928)
- 10 November – Enid McElwee, fencer (born 1914)
- 13 November
  - Jack Griffiths, rugby union player, soldier (born 1912)
  - Mayzod Reid, diver (born 1928)
- 6 December – Sir Peter Blake, yachtsman (born 1948)
- 13 December – Pamela Barham, netball player and coach
- 14 December – Reg Singer, association football player (born 1924)
- 20 December
  - Manuhuia Bennett – Anglican bishop (born 1916)
  - Dame Miraka Szászy, Māori leader (born 1921)
- 29 December – Brian Bansgrove, film gaffer (born 1941)

== See also ==
- List of years in New Zealand
- Timeline of New Zealand history
- History of New Zealand
- Military history of New Zealand
- Timeline of the New Zealand environment
- Timeline of New Zealand's links with Antarctica
