= Lydia (Fur Patrol song) =

2000 single by Fur Patrol

Single by Fur Patrol

from the album Pet
- B-side: "Andrew"; "Holy"
- Released: 2000
- Studio: Marmalade A (Wellington, New Zealand)
- Length: 4:15
- Label: Wishbone Music, WEA
- Songwriters: Julia Deans, Fur Patrol
- Producer: David Long

Fur Patrol singles chronology
"Holy" (2000)	"Lydia" (2000)	"Andrew" (2001)

"Lydia" is a song by New Zealand band Fur Patrol from their debut studio album, Pet, released in 2000. Written by lead vocalist Julia Deans, the song is about a woman who observes that her ex-lover is in a new relationship with another woman—Lydia. The song spent 19 weeks on the New Zealand Singles Chart, peaking at number one on 24 December 2000. In 2001, it was voted the 19th-best New Zealand song of all time by APRA. The song also won two awards at the 2001 New Zealand Music Awards: Single of the Year and Best Songwriter (awarded to Deans). "Lydia" was released in Australia on 18 March 2002 but did not chart.

== Background and release ==
Deans said of the song, "It's a classic story. The jilted ex, and it's not necessarily an ex, walks into a cafe or bar and sees the significant other at a table with another other. We have all been there. It was drawn as much from one's own relationships as it was from other people's. When you are young, you end up being that person sitting in a bar and watching your recent beloved getting cosy with someone else. So I guess the song is about that moment when you know a relationship is over but are faced with the reality of it, that someone you thought you loved and thought loved you, has moved on."

There was nothing cerebral about the selection of the name Lydia. It just fell out.

It was syllabically and phonetically pleasing within the song. When I write, a lot of words that come that way. Lydia came very quickly. I wrote it pretty much in the time it takes to play the song maybe three times.

It's one of those moments that you live for as a songwriter. I don't think it has ever happened that quickly with anything else that I have written. Because it happened so quickly and naturally, it felt good.

— Julia Deans

In New Zealand and Australia, "Lydia" was issued as a CD single containing four tracks: the original version of "Lydia", an acoustic version as the closing track, and two other songs from Pet recorded during sessions with New Zealand radio manager Helen Young—"Andrew" and "Holy".

== Credits and personnel ==
Credits are lifted from the Pet liner notes.

Studios

- Recorded and mixed at Marmalade Studio A (Wellington, New Zealand)
- Mastered at 301 Sydney (Sydney, Australia)

Fur Patrol

- Fur Patrol – writing
  - Julia Deans – writing, vocals, guitar, keyboards
  - Steven Wells – guitar
  - Andrew Bain – bass keyboards
  - Simon Braxton – drums, percussion

Other personnel

- David Long – production
- Mike Gibson – recording
- Sam Gibson – mixing, mastering
- Steve Smart – mastering

== Charts ==
=== Weekly charts ===
Chart (2000–2001)	Peak position
New Zealand (Recorded Music NZ)	1

=== Year-end charts ===
Chart (2001)	Position
New Zealand (RIANZ)	46

== Certifications ==
Region	Certification	Certified units/sales
New Zealand (RMNZ)	Platinum	30,000^{‡}
^{‡} Sales+streaming figures based on certification alone.
