= Past, Present, Future (Tiki Taane album) =

Studio album by Tiki Taane
- Released: 22 October 2007
- Venue: Muriwai
- Genres: Dub, drum & bass, electronica, acoustic
- Length: 54:27
- Label: Dirty Dub
- Producers: Tiki Taane; Sean Deans; Motive; P-Money

Tiki Taane chronology
Past, Present, Future (2007)	Flux (2009)

Singles from Past, Present, Future
- 1. "Tangaroa" Released: 2007; 2. "Always on My Mind" Released: 28 April 2008

Past, Present, Future is the first solo album of New Zealand musician Tiki Taane. It features a fusion of Taane’s trademark bass-heavy production with traditional Māori instrumentation, a style which Taane describes as “punk dub meets tangata whenua”.

Guest vocalists include Taane’s father Uekaha Taane Tinorau and grandmother Inuwai, as well as Paora "P.Digsss" Apera (Shapeshifter), Julia Deans (Fur Patrol), Celia Church, and Zaniah Carigiet.

== Composition ==
The opening track of the album is titled "Whakapuaki", translated by Taane as "an awakening". The lyrics were written by Taane's brother-in-law and performed by his father Uekaha. Taane sees this track as acknowledging the higher forces, the higher entities and the listeners, clearing space to allow the listener to properly listen through the whole album. The second track is named after Tangaroa, the god of the sea in Māori mythology. This was the first song Taane wrote for the album, four years before recording. This track includes tribal elements with a haka performed by Uekaha on top.

Sean Deans (Bass Frontiers) wrote the beat for "Now This Is It", while Taane wrote the verses and choruses. Zaniah Carigiet from Kobra Kai in Sydney sang the intro and outro. Taane played the drums on "Our Favourite Target", with Julia Deans from Fur Patrol on vocals. Sean Deans wrote the dancehall beat for "Faded", while P.Digsss performed a duet with Taane. The song is about friendship, respect, love and admiratxfion. The Melbourne-based production duo Motive produced most of the beat for "Saviour Dub", which features what Taane descibes as a "reggae jungle crossover sound".

"Always on My Mind" features Taane on acoustic guitar and vocals and was written for his ex-girlfriend. A triumph of song writing and performing, "Always on my Mind" held the number one spot in the New Zealand top 40 chart for over nine weeks, and remained in the top 40 for over 40 weeks, over 30 of which were spent in the top 15. "Wotcha Got" features Evan Short from Concord Dawn on heavy metal guitar, and live drumming from David Deakins of Salmonella Dub. "Wotcha Got" was slated to be included on the Salmonella Dub album Heal Me, but was turned down.

For the dub version of "Always On My Mind", Taane played a simple drum loop. The track features a string quartet from Wellington. Taane says, "The original version of "Always on My Mind" is pretty happy and up-tempo, so I wanted to do something that was sad and said “I miss you”."

"Music Has Saved Me" features a beat produced by P-Money. The song pays homage to music and the positive effect it has had on Taane's life. The chorus is inspired by a line from Ini Kamoze's "World A Music". The album's title track features vocals from Taane's grandmother Inuwai, who had died about fifteen years earlier. Her vocals come from a tape recording of her singing one of her babies to sleep in the 1970s. The song has no beat; Taane arranged some strings and noises around the vocal. Taane pays tribute to the Māori tradition of recording history through waiata.

For "It's All in Your Head", Taane played the instruments while Celia Church sang the main vocal lead. The album's final track, "Tainui Waka", pays tribute to the people of the waka Tainui, one of the traditional original canoes to bring the Māori people to New Zealand. The track was inspired by a vision Taane had while on a spiritual journey in Rarotonga, sitting on a beach which was the launch site for the original Tainui waka.

== Track listing ==
All tracks are written by Tiki Taane except where noted.

No.	Title	Writer(s)	Length
1.	"Whakapuaki"	Taane; Inia Taylor	1:48
2.	"Tangaroa"		5:00
3.	"Now This Is It"	Taane; Sean Deans	3:23
4.	"Our Favourite Target"		5:25
5.	"Faded"	Taane; S. Deans; Paora Apera	4:02
6.	"Saviour Dub"		6:10
7.	"Always On My Mind"		2:56
8.	"Wotcha Got"		3:44
9.	"Always On My Mind Dub"		4:47
10.	"Music Has Saved Me"		4:19
11.	"Past, Present, Future"		4:24
12.	"It's All in Your Head"		5:27
13.	"Tainui Waka"		8:29
Total length:			54:27

== Personnel ==
=== Musicians ===
- Tiki Taane – production (all tracks), vocals (2–10, 12, 13), drums (4, 9, 12), acoustic guitar (7), string arrangements (9, 11), bass guitar (12), piano (12), keyboards (12)
- Uekaha Taane Tinorau – vocals (1, 2)
- Zaniah Carigiet – vocals (3)
- Julia Deans – vocals (4)
- Paora "P.Digsss" Apera – duet vocals (5)
- Evan Short – electric guitar (8)
- David Deakins – drums (8)
- Inuwai Taane Tinorau – recorded vocals (11)
- Celia Church – vocals (12)

=== Production ===
- Sean Deans – beat production (3, 5)
- Motive (Mark Hunt, Tony Anderson) – beat production (6)
- Peter "P-Money" Wadams – beat production (10)

== Charts ==
Taane's first solo single, "Always On My Mind" has been certified platinum and made it to number one in New Zealand, knocking Chris Brown off the top spot after an eight-week reign. The album Past, Present, Future has also been certified platinum in New Zealand and peaked at number four on the charts.

Singles Chart	Peak position	Sales
NZ Top 40 Singles	1	7,500+

Album Chart	Peak position	Sales
NZ Top 40 Albums	4	15,000+
