= The Adults =

Musical group from New Zealand

- Origin: New Zealand
- Genres: Rock, pop, electronica, Aghani al-banat, Hip hop
- Years active: 2010–12, 2018
- Label: Warner Music NZ
- Members: Jon Toogood; Tiki Taane; Julia Deans; Shayne Carter; Ladi6; Anika Moa; Gary Sullivan; Nick Roughan; Riki Gooch; Warren Maxwell; Steve Bremner; Ruban Nielson; Kody Nielson; Redford Grenell; Gisma; Devin Abrams; Estère; Chelsea Jade; Aaradhna; Miloux; Kings (musician); Raiza Biza; JessB

The Adults (featuring Kings) performing "Take It On The Chin".

The Adults is a "collaborative name" used for two different recording projects led by New Zealand musician and Shihad frontman Jon Toogood. The first iteration of the Adults was a New Zealand rock supergroup that released a self-titled album in 2011. In 2018 a completely different set of musicians (other than Toogood) performed on Haja, an album that blended Aghani Al-Banat (a Sudanese style that translates to "girls' music" and is performed at weddings) with New Zealand hip hop.

== New Zealand supergroup, 2010–12 ==
Beginning as a solo project of Jon Toogood's, the original Adults involved many established New Zealand musicians, including Shayne Carter, Julia Deans, Anika Moa, Tiki Taane and Ladi6. Album The Adults was released in 2011 and reached number four in the New Zealand album charts. It was nominated for Album of the Year at the 2012 New Zealand Music Awards, and the single "Anniversary Day" was on the long list for the 2012 APRA Silver Scroll award.

In June 2012 The Adults performed a concert with the Christchurch Symphony Orchestra at CBS Arena in Christchurch, New Zealand. A special edition of their album The Adults with live tracks from the concert was released in November 2012.

== Haja, 2014–2018 ==
The 2018 album Haja was released as The Adults in order to secure the participation of Warner Music after the recordings were made. Over the four years it took to create the album, Toogood had not had the name in mind.

In 2014 Toogood married Dana Salih in Khartoum, the capital of her home country, Sudan. The traditional three-day ceremony included a dance performed by the bride on the final day. Other than the groom, only women are involved as spectators, drummers (the only instruments played) and singers. Women also write all the music and lyrics. The style is called Aghani al-banat, "girl's music", and is usually only performed live.

The wedding was Toogood's first encounter with Aghani al-banat, and in particular the famous performer Gisma. As he explained it, "It sounded amazing, thrilling, like some new MIA track I've never heard... Given Islamic laws it felt kind of subversive. ... I couldn't hide my enthusiasm. [The band] stuck around after the wedding and I told them wanted to record with them. I'm not sure they believed me - then a year later I turned up."

Haja combined iPhone recordings made in Sudan in 2015 (the more formal recording sessions didn't yield anything usable) with basslines played by Toogood and vocal contributions from New Zealand hip hop artists including Chelsea Jade, Raiza Biza and Aaradhna. In keeping with the spirit of Aghani al-banat, Toogood invited mostly female collaborators. He originally didn't plan to sing any vocals of his own, but negotiations with Warner Music led to him being heard on two songs.

Haja reached #14 in New Zealand's album charts. In 2018 Toogood wrote an academic paper about the project. Entitled Haja: Incorporating Aghani Al-Banat into a Western Popular Music Recording Project, which formed part of his study towards a Master of Fine Arts.

== Members ==
- Jon Toogood (Shihad)

=== The Adults, 2011 ===
- Tiki Taane (Salmonella Dub)
- Julia Deans (Fur Patrol)
- Shayne Carter (Straitjacket Fits, Dimmer)
- Ladi6
- Anika Moa
- Gary Sullivan (JPS Experience, The Stereo Bus)
- Nick Roughan (The Skeptics)
- Riki Gooch (TrinityRoots, Fat Freddy's Drop)
- Warren Maxwell (TrinityRoots, Fat Freddy's Drop, Little Bushman)
- Steve Bremner (Rhian Sheehan)
- Ruban Nielson (The Mint Chicks, Unknown Mortal Orchestra)
- Kody Nielson (The Mint Chicks, Opossum)
- Redford Grenell

=== Haja, 2018 ===
==== Sudan ====
- Gisma

==== New Zealand ====
- Devin Abrams
- Estère
- Chelsea Jade
- Aaradhna
- Miloux
- Kings
- Raiza Biza
- JessB

== Discography ==
=== Albums ===
Year	Title	Details	Peak chart positions
Year	Title	Details	NZ
2011	One Million Ways EP	Released: 9 May 2011; Format: Digital download; Label: Warner Music New Zealand	—
2011	The Adults	Released: 20 June 2011; Format: CD/Digital download; Label: Warner Music New Zealand	4
2012	The Adults + Live With the CSO	Released: 2 November 2012; Format: CD/Digital download; Label: Warner Music New Zealand	-
2018	HAJA	Released: 20 July 2018; Format: CD/Digital download; Label: Warner Music New Zealand	14
"—" denotes releases that did not chart or were not released in that country.

=== Singles ===
Year	Single	Peak chart positions	Album
Year	Single	NZ	Album
2011	"One Million Ways"	—	The Adults
2011	"A Part of Me"	—	The Adults
2011	"Nothing to Lose"	—	The Adults
"—" denotes releases that did not chart or were not released in that country.

== Awards ==
Year	Award	Category	Work	Result
2012	APRA Silver Scroll	Long list	"Anniversary Day" Julia Deans and Jon Toogood	Nominated
2012	New Zealand Music Awards	Album of the Year	The Adults	Nominated
