= The Adults (album) =

Studio album by The Adults
- Released: June 20, 2011
- Recorded: Auckland, Wellington, Melbourne and other locations
- Genre: rock, pop, electronica
- Length: 48:14
- Label: Warner Music New Zealand
- Producer: Jon Toogood & Tiki Taane

The Adults is the self-titled debut album by New Zealand supergroup The Adults. The album was released in June 2011 and spent 11 weeks in the New Zealand album chart, peaking at number four. In addition to Jon Toogood, the album included contributions from Shayne Carter, Anika Moa and Julia Deans.

The album was recorded in locations in Australia and New Zealand, including recording facilities The Lab and Tikidub Productions in Auckland, the Blue Room in Wellington and Stonefeather Studios in Featherston, as well as the homes of various band members in Auckland, Wellington, Melbourne, and Palmerston North.

The album was released with a Deluxe Edition; an iTunes Deluxe Edition with B-sides, remixes and videos; and a bonus edition which includes tracks from The Adults' June 2012 concert with the Christchurch Symphony Orchestra. Three singles have been released from The Adults: "One Million Ways", "A Part of Me" and "Nothing to Lose".

The Adults was nominated for Album of the Year at the 2012 New Zealand Music Awards

== Track listing ==
No.	Title	Writer(s)	Length
1.	"One Million Ways"	Jon Toogood & Shayne Carter	3:22
2.	"A Part of Me"	Jon Toogood & Anika Moa	3:20
3.	"A New Beginning"	Jon Toogood & Julia Deans	4:29
4.	"Reunite"	Jon Toogood	3:09
5.	"Nothing to Lose"	Karoline Tamati (Ladi6)	4:15
6.	"Sleep Me Tight"	Jon Toogood & Anika Moa	2:38
7.	"Most Important"	Jon Toogood & Shayne Carter	3:52
8.	"Up and Gone"	Jon Toogood & Shayne Carter	3:29
9.	"Everyday I Wake Up"	Jon Toogood & Julia Deans	3:03
10.	"Long Way Off"	Jon Toogood & Shayne Carter	3:47
11.	"Anniversary Day"	Jon Toogood & Julia Deans	4:50
12.	"Please Wake Up"	Jon Toogood & Karoline Tamati (Ladi6)	7:45

Deluxe Edition
No.	Title	Writer(s)	Length
1.	"One Million Ways"	Jon Toogood & Shayne Carter	3:22
2.	"A Part of Me"	Jon Toogood & Anika Moa	3:20
3.	"A New Beginning"	Jon Toogood & Julia Deans	4:29
4.	"Reunite"	Jon Toogood	3:09
5.	"Nothing to Lose"	Karoline Tamati (Ladi6)	4:15
6.	"Sleep Me Tight"	Jon Toogood & Anika Moa	2:38
7.	"Most Important"	Jon Toogood & Shayne Carter	3:52
8.	"Up and Gone"	Jon Toogood & Shayne Carter	3:29
9.	"Everyday I Wake Up"	Jon Toogood & Julia Deans	3:03
10.	"Long Way Off"	Jon Toogood & Shayne Carter	3:47
11.	"Short Change"	Jon Toogood & Shayne Carter	4:24
12.	"Anniversary Day"	Jon Toogood & Julia Deans	4:50
13.	"Please Wake Up"	Jon Toogood & Karoline Tamati (Ladi6)	7:45
14.	"What People Think"	Jon Toogood	3:15

Live With the CSO
No.	Title	Length
1.	"Up and Gone"
2.	"Everyday I Wake Up"
3.	"Most Important"
4.	"One Million Ways"
5.	"Anniversary Day"
6.	"Nothing to Lose"
7.	"Short Change"
8.	"Sleep Me Tight"
9.	"A Part of Me"
10.	"Please Wake Up"

2012 iTunes Digital Deluxe Edition – B-Sides & Remixes
No.	Title	Writer(s)	Length
1.	"What People Think"	Jon Toogood	3:15
2.	"Middle of the Universe, Pt. 1"	Jon Toogood & Shayne Carter	3:32
3.	"Please Wake Up (Misled Convoy Remix)"	Jon Toogood & Karoline Tamati	7:01
4.	"Long Way Off (Simon Beeston Remix)"	Jon Toogood & Shayne Carter	7:01
5.	"Nothing To Lose (Dan Aux Remix)"	Karoline Tamati (Ladi6)	7:19
6.	"A Part of Me (Magik Johnson Mix)"	Jon Toogood & Anika Moa	5:26
7.	"Middle of the Universe, Pt. 2"	Jon Toogood	3:09
8.	"Nothing To Lose (Optimus Gryme Remix)"	Karoline Tamati (Ladi6)	6:58
9.	"Short Change"	Jon Toogood & Shayne Carter	4:24

2012 iTunes Digital Deluxe Edition – Videos
No.	Title	Director	Length
1.	"The Making of The Adults"		10:00
2.	"One Million Ways"	Raymond McGrath	3:25
3.	"A Part Of Me"	Tim Van Dammen	3:23
4.	"Reunite"	Luke Sharpe and Bunker Media	3:16
5.	"Nothing To Lose"		4:15
6.	"Up And Gone (Live at The Lab)"		3:35
7.	"Sleep Me Tight (Live at The Lab)"		2:54
8.	"Everyday I Wake Up (Live at the Lab)"		3:17
9.	"A Part Of Me (Live at The Lab)"		3:19
10.	"One Million Ways (Live at The Lab)"		3:27
11.	"Long Way Off (Live at The Lab)"		4:58
