= Starlifter (EP) =

1998 EP by Fur Patrol

EP by Fur Patrol
- Released: 1998
- Recorded: 1997–1998
- Studio: Marmalade (Wellington)
- Length: 25:13
- Label: Wishbone Music

Fur Patrol chronology
| Starlifter (1998) | Pet (2000) |

Starlifter is the debut EP by New Zealand rock band Fur Patrol, released in 1998 through Wishbone Music.

== Background and release ==
Fur Patrol first began recording material in 1996 but negotiations with the Wishbone Music label prevented them from beginning work on Starlifter until the following year. The process took place at Wellington's Marmalade Studios and lasted into 1998, with Wishbone releasing the EP later that year as its first release. It had unprecedented success for a release on an indie label in New Zealand and had sold around 3,000 units by mid-2000. Starlifter additionally won Best Independent Release at the 1999 bNet Music Awards.

As promotion, music videos were released for the tracks "Dominoes" and "Beautiful" in 1998 and 1999 respectively. Both directed by Greg Page, "Dominoes" was filmed in a home swimming pool in Palmerston North while "Beautiful" featured the members of Fur Patrol in a truck being driven around Petone.

== Track listing ==
Track listing adapted from the EP's liner notes and Spotify. All tracks are written by Fur Patrol.

| No. | Title | Length |
|---|---|---|
| 1. | "Dominoes" | 2:27 |
| 2. | "Man in a Box" | 4:48 |
| 3. | "All the People" | 3:15 |
| 4. | "Beautiful" | 3:31 |
| 5. | "Not Your Girl" | 5:40 |
| 6. | "The Lover" | 5:29 |
| Total length: | | 25:13 |

== Personnel ==
Personnel adapted from the EP's liner notes.

Fur Patrol

- Andrew Bain
- Simon Braxton
- Julia Deans
- Steve Wells

Technical

- Andrew Downes – engineering (1–3, 5, 6), mixing (5, 6)
- Tim Farrant – engineering (4), mixing (1–3, 4)

== Charts ==
| Chart (1998) | Peak position |
|---|---|
| New Zealand (Recorded Music NZ) | 17 |
