= Selwyn College (disambiguation) =

Selwyn College, Cambridge, is a college of the University of Cambridge, England.

Selwyn College may also refer to:

- Selwyn College, Auckland, a secondary school in Auckland, New Zealand
- Selwyn College, Otago, a college affiliated to the University of Otago, Dunedin, New Zealand
- Selwyn College, Guadalcanal, an Anglican secondary school in the Solomon Islands
