= The Liberation Of... =

Studio album by Ladi6
- Released: November 2010
- Genre: Hip hop
- Length: 37:56
- Label: Question Music
- Producer: Parks and Sebastian Weiss

Ladi6 chronology
| Time Is Not Much (2008) | The Liberation Of... (2010) | Automatic (2013) |

The Liberation Of... is the second album by Christchurch-born singer-songwriter/rapper Ladi6, released in November 2010. It was nominated for Album of the Year and won Best Urban/Hip Hop Album at the 2011 New Zealand Music Awards. It also won the 2011 Taite Music Prize and Best Urban Album at the 2011 Pacific Music Awards.

The same year Ladi6 won Best Female Solo Artist and was nominated in a total of six categories at the 2011 New Zealand Music Awards. She also won Best Female Artist at the 2011 Pacific Music Awards.

The Liberation Of... was co-produced by Parks and Sebastian Weiss (a.k.a. DJ Sepalot) of the German hip hop group Blumentopf and features Myele Manzanza of Electric Wire Hustle, Toby Laing of Fat Freddy's Drop and German singer Esther Adams. It was released independently in New Zealand, where it debuted at number six on the NZ Top 40 Album Chart. It spent 34 weeks in the top 40 and was certified gold in July 2011. The single "Like Water" from this album peaked at number 9 on the NZ Top 40 Singles Chart, spent 22 weeks on the charts and was certified platinum in June 2011.

The Liberation Of... was released in Europe on German label Eskapaden Records in May 2011. The song "Jazmine D.L." is a tribute to her cousin, who died.

== Track listing ==
1. "Bang Bang" – 3:38
2. "Koln" – 4:04
3. "Jazmine D.L" – 2:35
4. "98 Til Now" – 2:40
5. "Like Water" – 3:10
6. "Norwest" – 4:03
7. "Burn with Me" – 4:31
8. "Goodday" – 5:55
9. "Let It Go" – 3:27
10. "Squid" – 3:53

== Charts ==
Chart performance for The Liberation Of...
| Chart (2010) | Peak position |
|---|---|
| New Zealand Albums (RMNZ) | 6 |

== Certifications ==
Certifications for The Liberation Of...
| Region | Certification | Certified units/sales |
|---|---|---|
| New Zealand (RMNZ) | Gold | 7,500^{^} |
^{^} Shipments figures based on certification alone.
