= Always on My Mind (Tiki Taane song) =

"Always On My Mind"

Single by Tiki Taane

from the album Past, Present, Future
- Released: 28 April 2008
- Genre: Acoustic reggae
- Length: 2:56
- Songwriter: Tiki Taane

Tiki Taane singles chronology
| "Always On My Mind" (2008) | "Starship Lullaby" (2010) |

"Always On My Mind" is a single by the New Zealand singer Tiki Taane. It was released as the first single from Taane's first solo album, Past, Present, Future. It reached number one on the New Zealand Singles Chart.

The song has been certified 2× Platinum and made it to number one in New Zealand, knocking Chris Brown off the top spot after an eight-week reign. The song spent nineteen non-consecutive weeks in the top ten, including two weeks at number one, and a total of fifty-five weeks in the chart so far. "Always On My Mind" has also become one of the most successful singles of all time in New Zealand, landing at number one on the Best of All Time Singles Chart, a chart that has been tracking singles since 1994. The title was previously held by "Bathe in the River" by Hollie Smith.

In September 2019, Taane re-recorded the song for Waiata / Anthems, a collection of re-recorded New Zealand pop songs to promote te Wiki o te Reo Māori (Māori Language Week). The new version, retitled "Kei Tōku Ngākau Nei Koe / Always on My Mind", featured lyrics reinterpreted by scholar Tīmoti Kāretu.

== Charts ==
| Singles Chart | Peak position |
|---|---|
| New Zealand Singles Chart | 1 |

== Certifications ==
Certifications for "Always on My Mind"
| Region | Certification | Certified units/sales |
|---|---|---|
| New Zealand (RMNZ) | 7× Platinum | 210,000^{‡} |
^{‡} Sales+streaming figures based on certification alone.
