= Like Water (Ladi6 song) =

Single by Ladi6

from the album The Liberation Of...
- Released: 13 May 2011
- Length: 3:10
- Label: Question Music
- Songwriter(s): Karoline Fuarosa, Sebastian Weiss-Laughton

Ladi6 singles chronology
"Bang Bang" (2010)	"Like Water" (2011)	"Confusion of a Lady" (2012)

"Like Water" is a 2011 single by New Zealand singer-songwriter/rapper Ladi6. The song originally appeared on her album The Liberation Of... and was subsequently released as a single in March 2011.

It peaked at number 9 on the NZ Top 40 Singles Chart and spent 22 weeks in the top 40. It was ranked at number 23 on the 2011 year-end chart.

"Like Water" was nominated for Single of the Year and director Faye McNeil was nominated for its music video at the 2011 New Zealand Music Awards.

== Charts ==
=== Weekly charts ===
Weekly chart performance for "Like Water"
Chart (2011)	Peak position
New Zealand (Recorded Music NZ)	9

=== Year-end charts ===
Year-end chart performance for "Like Water"
Chart (2011)	Position
New Zealand (Recorded Music NZ)	23
