= Selwyn College, Auckland =

Selwyn College
- Māori: Te Kāreti o Herewini
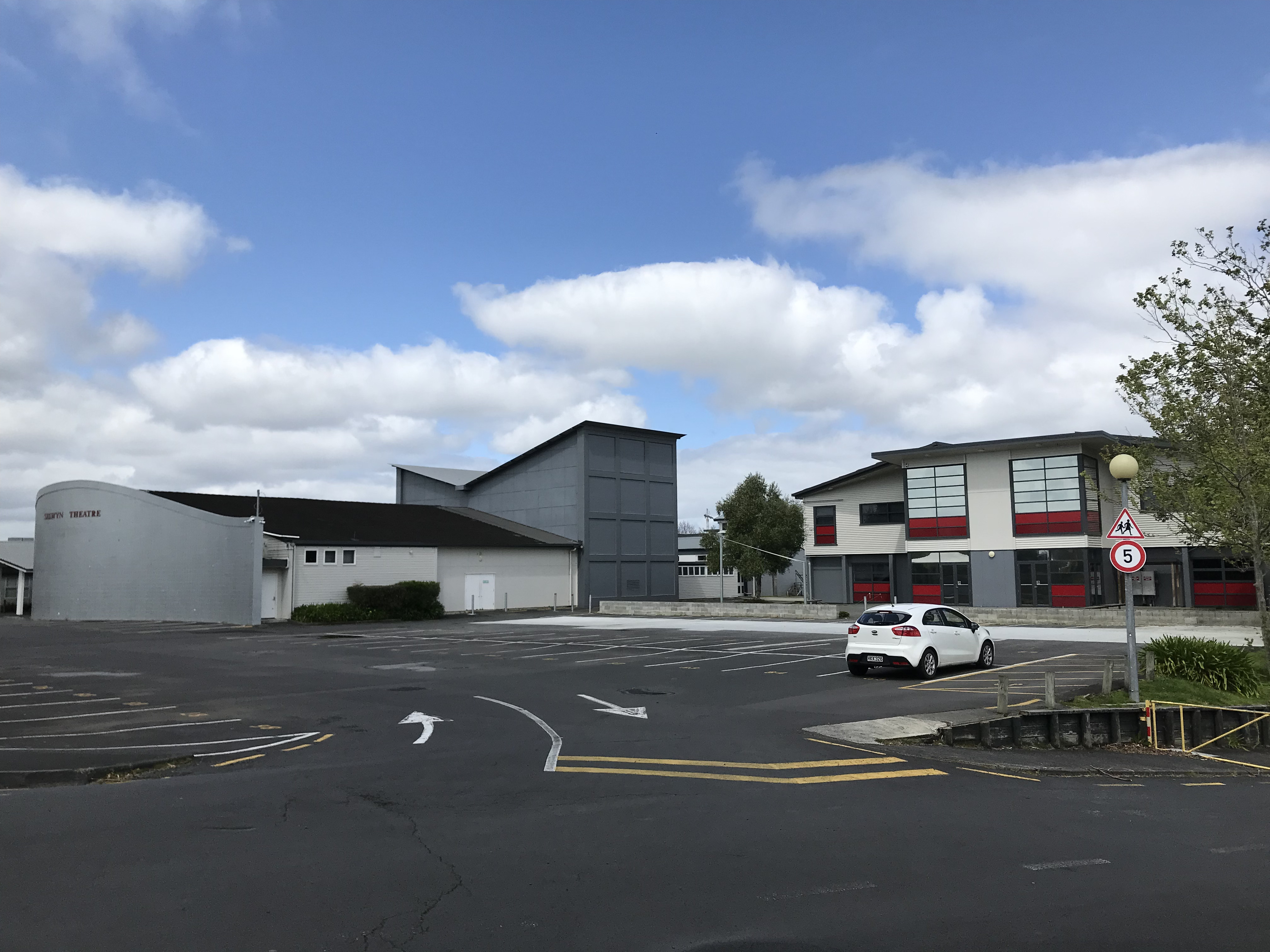

Location
- Kohimarama Road, Kohimarama, Auckland, New Zealand; 36°51′45″S 174°50′17″E

Information
- Type: State, co-educational, secondary
- Established: 1956
- Ministry of Education Institution no.: 49
- Principal: Sheryll Ofner
- Enrolment: 1,588 (July 2026)
- Socio-economic decile: 4J
- Website: selwyn.school.nz

Selwyn College (Māori: Te Kāreti o Herewini) is a co-educational state secondary school in Kohimarama, Auckland, New Zealand.

== History ==
Selwyn College was built in 1956 to service Auckland's rapidly growing suburban sprawl during the post-war population boom and newly developed areas such as Meadowbank–St. Johns and Kohimarama–Ōrākei. Its founding principal was Ngata Pitcaithly. As a multi-cultural school in the eastern suburbs area, Selwyn values its historic connections with Ngāti Whātua-o-Ōrākei.

The college has an annual full-school term-one musical, and other theatrical productions throughout the year. Selwyn has one of the largest theatres in a New Zealand public school. Selwyn also holds an annual multicultural show, featuring performances from the many ethnic and cultural groups represented in the school's community.

Selwyn has featured in the media as the school that educated the refugees who arrived in New Zealand following the Tampa affair in 2001. The school runs a Refugee Education for Adults and Families programme (REAF), providing classes for adult former refugees. Part of the success of the programme is because of the onsite Carol White Family Centre, opened in 2004.

In 2002, Selwyn College hosted the filming of a popular TV3 television documentary series called School Rules which followed the lives of several of its students. On the occasion of the school's 50th anniversary, Radio New Zealand broadcast a programme surveying the high-profile success of the many musicians who had attended the school.

Prior to the appointment of Sheryll Ofner as principal in 2008, Selwyn College experienced a tumultuous few years as some local residents and the local MP Allan Peachey criticised the school for its falling roll and alleged academic and disciplinary failures. Other members of the school community, parents, teachers and students fiercely defended the school in the face of what they saw as unfair criticisms. Peachey was forced to apologise publicly for sending an offensive email to the then co-principal, Carol White.

The Government dissolved Selwyn's board of trustees and replaced it with a commissioner on 20 January 2009, due to longstanding differences between board members and some members of the local community. Some level of stability has been restored to the school in later 2009 as the new administration has consolidated itself. A new uniform has been introduced to help 'rebrand' the school. Academic results, while never as bad as the school's critics made out, have noticeably improved since 2008, with a Selwyn year 12 pupil topping New Zealand in one of the 2009 Cambridge International AS Level Examinations.

Following a range of changes, the school had a significant shift in results, lifting the NCEA Level 1 pass rate from 39% to 93% in seven years. In 2013, pass rates had risen to 93% in Level 1, 94% in Level 2 and 90% in Level 3. Education Professor John Hattie described the progress as "stunning" and an example of "what can happen with inspired, passionate leadership with a laser focus on students". In 2016, the principal Sheryll Ofner won the 2017 Woolf Fisher Award for Education and Excellence which included an 11-week trip to Harvard University and across Europe.

On 16 September 2016 four Selwyn College students had won the Auckland Schools Debating Advanced Open Competition. The school is home to the Barfoot & Thompson Stadium, where numerous local, national and international sporting events are held. One of these events is Mathex, notable for its citywide popularity.

== Enrolment ==
In 2014, the roll was 802, 53% of whom were male, and 47% female. 31 were international students. The ethnic make-up of the school was: 32% European, 17% Māori, 13% Pasifika, 10% Southeast Asian, 5% Chinese, 4% Arab, 3% Indian, 2% African, 2% Latin American, and 1% "other ethnicity". Selwyn was last visited by the Education Review Office in November 2019.

As of July 2026, Selwyn College has a roll of 1,588 students, of which 121 (7.6%) identify as Māori.

As of 2026, the school has an Equity Index of 411, placing it amongst schools whose students have few socioeconomic barriers to achievement (roughly equivalent to deciles 8 and 9 under the former socio-economic decile system).

== Alumni ==
Notable alumni include:

- MP Dr Jackie Blue
- Academic Damon Salesa – appointed Vice Chancellor of Auckland University of Technology in 2021.
- Academic Alexandra Brewis Slade
- Actor Danielle Cormack
- Actor Angela Dotchin
- Chess Player Martin Dreyer
- Musician Liam Finn
- Author Charlotte Grimshaw
- Author Pip Adam
- Entrepreneur Derek Handley
- Stuntwoman/Actress Zoë Bell
- Former All Blacks Captain Andy Dalton (rugby union)
- Footballer Alex Paulsen
- Boxing Promoter David Higgins
- Musicians Murray Grindlay and Neil Edwards (The Underdogs/Monte Video/The Human Instinct)
- Musicians Nigel Russell and Nick Hanson (The Spelling Mistakes)
- Musicians Otis 'OJ' Frizzell and Mark 'Slave' Williams (MC OJ & Rhythm Slave)
- Semi Lemon Kola/Propeller bandmembers Derryk 'D-Rawk' Hunt, Robert Young and artist Gareth Price (Augustino)
- Musicians Chris Familton, Antony McDonald and Blair McDonald (Thorazine Shuffle)
- Musician Isaac Tucker (Cuba & Gizmo, Loungehead, Spektrum)
- Musicians Ben Sciascia, Karl Steven, Tim Stewart and Nick Atkinson (Supergroove)
- Musician Ned Ngatae aka Killamanraro (Trinity Roots/Sola Rosa/Dimmer/Fat Freddy's Drop)
- Musician Kirsten Morrell, lead singer of Goldenhorse
- Mathematics Educator and New Zealander of the Year award recipient Subash Chandar
