= Pet (album) =

2000 studio album by Fur Patrol

Studio album by Fur Patrol
- Released: 24 September 2000
- Studio: Marmalade Studios, Wellington
- Genre: Rock, alternative rock, pop
- Length: 65:23
- Label: Warner Music, Wishbone Music
- Producer: David Long

Fur Patrol chronology
Starlifter (1998)	Pet (2000)	Collider (2003)

Singles from Pet
- 1. "Now" Released: 1999; 2. "Holy" Released: 2000; 3. "Lydia" Released: 2000; 4. "Andrew" Released: 2001; 5. "Spinning a Line" Released: 2001

Pet is the debut album by New Zealand rock band, Fur Patrol, released on 24 September 2000.

== Chart performance ==
Pet debuted on the New Zealand Albums Chart on 29 October 2000 at number fourteen, before peaking the next week at number seven. After six weeks in the chart, it slipped out of the top fifty. The release of the second single, "Lydia", prompted the album to re-enter the chart at number forty-four on 17 December 2000. Pet spent a total of thirty weeks in the chart.

== Singles ==
Pet spawned five singles. "Now" and "Holy", the album's first two singles, were not commercially successful, failing to appear on any record chart. The third single, "Lydia", went to number-one on the New Zealand Singles Chart on 24 December 2000, succeeding "Independent Women Part I" by Destiny's Child. The song spent one week in the top spot, (Note: No charts were published from 25 December 2000 to 13 January 2001. "Lydia" was therefore only number one for one chart.) knocked off by the Backstreet Boys' "Shape of My Heart". "Lydia" spent nineteen weeks in the chart. "Andrew" (which was initially called "Sorry" on the media reference CD of 4/5/2000) peaked at number twenty-four on the singles chart, spending a total of fifteen weeks there, while "Spinning a Line", the album's fifth and final single, spent three weeks in the New Zealand Singles Chart, peaking at number forty.

== Track listing ==
All songs written by Julia Deans, Andrew Bain, Simon Braxton, and Steve Wells.

1. "Andrew" - 3:46
2. "Holy" - 2:55
3. "Now" - 3:04
4. "Loaded" - 5:44
5. "Lydia" - 4:15
6. "Hauling You Around" - 5:44
7. "Not Your Girl" - 5:46
8. "Spinning a Line" - 5:05
9. "Two Days" - 3:51
10. "Brightest Star" - 4:00
11. "Short Way To Fall" - 5:48
12. "Man In A Box" - 4:57 (2 minutes and 3 seconds of silence follows)
13. "Bottles And Jars" (hidden track) - 8:25

Source: Bandcamp

== Pet 21st Birthday Tour Postponement Treat ==
On 10 September 2021 Fur Patrol released a single titled "Pet 21st Birthday Tour Postponement Treat" exclusively onto their SoundCloud. The single was released as "A little placeholder/peace-offering to fill the gap until we play these shows in Feb-Mar 2022!" and includes two songs, "These Days (Pet outtake)" and "Lydia (Acoustic Version)". "Lydia (Acoustic Version)" was previously released on the CD single of "Lydia" however "These Days (Pet outtake)" was an unreleased outtake from the recordings of Pet. The single has not been officially released elsewhere.

== Personnel ==
- Andrew Bain - bass, keyboards
- Simon Braxton - drums, percussion, theremin, vocals
- Julia Deans - guitar, violin, vocals
- Mike Gibson - recording
- Sam Gibson - mastering, audio mixing
- Steve King - assistant photography
- David Long - production
- Becky Nunes - photography
- Steve Smart - mastering
- Jade Weaver - artwork
- Andrew B. White - artwork
- Steven Wells - guitar, vocals

Source: Discogs
