= Time Is Not Much =

Studio album by Ladi6
- Released: November 2008
- Length: 45:46
- Label: Question Music
- Producer: Parks

Ladi6 chronology
Time Is Not Much (2008)	The Liberation Of... (2010)

Time Is Not Much is the debut album by Christchurch-born singer-songwriter/rapper Ladi6, released in November 2008. It won Best Urban/Hip Hop Album and Ladi6 was nominated for Best Female Solo Artist at the 2009 New Zealand Music Awards. In the same year Ladi6 won Best Pacific Female Artist at the 2009 Pacific Music Awards.

Time Is Not Much was released independently in New Zealand and debuted at number 4 on the New Zealand Top 40 Album chart, staying in the top 40 albums for 10 weeks. The album was mostly produced by Ladi6's partner Parks (a.k.a. Brent Park). It was released throughout Europe by London label BBE Records in July 2010.

== Track listing ==
1. "Give Me the Light" – 3:23
2. "Call You Out" – 3:23
3. "So Far" – 4:18
4. "Walk Right Up" – 4:38
5. "Down and Out" – 5:27
6. "Question?" – 5:43
7. "Time Is Not Much (Boogie's Interlude)" – 1:59
8. "Dark Brown" – 4:08
9. "Believe Me" – 3:47
10. "Jacknife" – 4:11
11. "More than Fake" – 4:47
12. "Danger" (hidden track)

== Charts ==
Chart performance for Time Is Not Much
Chart (2008)	Peak position
New Zealand Albums (RMNZ)	4
