= Starship Lullaby =

Single by Tiki Taane

from the album In The World of Light
- Released: October 3, 2010
- Recorded: 2010
- Genre: Acoustic
- Length: 4:08
- Label: Dirty Dub
- Songwriter: Tiki Taane

Tiki Taane singles chronology
"Always on my Mind" (2008)	"Starship Lullaby" (2010)	"Summertime" (2010)

"Starship Lullaby" is a charity single by New Zealand singer Tiki Taane for Starship Hospital. It is his second single since 2008, when he released his hit single "Always on My Mind". It debuted and peaked on the RIANZ charts at number 9. It then slipped off the charts three weeks later.

== Music video ==
The music video for "Starship Lullaby" was shot at Starship Hospital New Zealand. Taane is singing with his guitar in a circle as the children surround him. Scenes also show him with his baby son.

== Production ==
The song was inspired by his baby son. He says he would sing "Starship Lullaby" and it would calm him down. He decided to create a song out of it just for his son. He then had a dream that he had given the song to Starship as a charity single.
