= Erkin Bairam =

Cypriot-born New Zealand economist

Erkin Bayram (1958 – 21 May 2001) was a Cypriot-born economist who taught in the Department of Economics at the University of Otago, New Zealand.

Born in Nicosia, Cyprus, Bairam studied at the University of Essex in Colchester, England, where he gained a BA (Hons) in Economics in 1980. He left Essex for the University of Hull, where he was awarded an MA in econometrics in 1982. He then began work on his PhD thesis entitled "Returns to Scale, Technical Progress and Industrial Growth in the USSR and Eastern Europe: An Empirical Study, 1961–75", with John McCombie as his supervisor. He was awarded his doctorate in 1986 and the following year was appointed as a lecturer at the University of Otago. In 1991, after only four years and at the age of 33, he had risen to the rank of full professor.

Bairam died in Dunedin on 21 May 2001 at the age of 43. At the time of his death, he had published over 60 articles and 4 books. The Department of Economics at the University of Otago awards an annual undergraduate prize named in Bairam's honor.

== Work ==
Bairam's two main interests were the theoretical specification and estimation of aggregate production functions and the testing of Thirlwall's Law of economic growth.

He also worked in applied econometrics and econometric theory and the areas of inflation and labour economics. He was also interested in the economics of sport, especially cricket and lacrosse, and published some papers in this area.

Bairam also worked on calculating research rankings of economics departments. He published an article on this topic in the Journal of Economic Literature.
