= Collider (Fur Patrol album) =

Studio album by Fur Patrol
- Released: 2003 (NZ), 2004 (AU)
- Recorded: Sing Sing Studio's in Melbourne, Australia
- Genre: Rock
- Length: 52:50
- Label: Universal Music
- Producer: Mark Wallis

Fur Patrol chronology
Pet (2000)	Collider (2003)	Local Kid (2008)

Collider is a studio album, released in 2003, by the Australia-based New Zealand rock band Fur Patrol. It peaked at 31 on the New Zealand album chart.

== Album ==
=== Track listing (AU) ===
1. "Precious" – 2:58
2. "Get Along" – 3:10
3. "Rocket" – 3:34
4. "Enemy" – 5:32
5. "Into the Sun" – 5:15
6. "Softer Landing" – 5:07
7. "Fade Away" – 4:40
8. "Someone You Really Want" – 6:32
9. "All These Things" – 4:13
10. "Art of Conversation" – 5:42
11. "Little Heart" – 6:07

== Charts ==
Chart (2003)	Peak position
New Zealand Albums (RMNZ)	31
