= Augustino (band) =

New Zealand rock band

- Origin: Auckland, New Zealand
- Genres: Rock
- Years active: 1999–2005
- Labels: TaylorTalk Productions, distributed by Sony
- Past members: Sean Clarke; Joel Halstead; Wade Shotter; Gareth Price; Nick Buckton; Marcus Joyce

Augustino were a rock band from Auckland, New Zealand, best known for their 2002 single "Into the Grain".

== History ==
Augustino was formed in 1999 after Sean Clarke (vocals, guitar) and Joel Halstead (guitar, keyboard, vocals) started performing together. They were soon joined by drummer Wade Shotter, guitarist Gareth Price (who originally joined as a bassist) and bass player Marcus Joyce. After the band's early demo recordings, Joyce left the band and was replaced by Nick Buckton.

The band were signed to TaylorTalk Productions, the label of Auckland radio programme Robert Taylor, with marketing and distribution through Sony. The band initially released four singles in the early 2000s, with "Into the Grain" being the only single to chart and to appear on their subsequent album One Day Over. The brand received a $50,000 grant from NZ On Air for the production of One Day Over in 2003. A further three singles were released from the album.

The band were known for their innovative music videos, which were directed by drummer Wade Shotter. Augustino received funding of $5000 from NZ On Air for the production of each of their seven music videos. The video for "The Silent Film" was nominated for Best Video at the 2001 New Zealand Music Awards.

== After Augustino ==
Augustino have not released any new material since 2004. In 2005 Sean Clarke formed the three-piece Flammable Tramp. Joel Halstead is the guitarist in Auckland band Ekko Park. Wade Shotter works as a TV commercial and music video director. Gareth Price is a visual artist. Nick Buckton is a solo musician. Marcus Joyce has played with the Boxcar Guitars, Demi-Whores and the Drab Doo-Riffs.

== Discography ==
=== Albums ===
Year	Title	Details	Peak chart positions
Year	Title	Details	NZ
2003	One Day Over	Label: Sony Music NZ	—

=== EPs ===
Year	Title	Details	Peak chart positions
Year	Title	Details	NZ
2000	The Silent Film	Label: TaylorTalk Productions	—
2002	Into The Grain	Label: TaylorTalk Productions	—

=== Singles ===
Year	Title	Peak chart positions	Album
Year	Title	NZ	Album
2000	"The Silent Film"	—	The Silent Film EP
2001	"Overblown"	—	Non-album single
2002	"Into the Grain"	33	Into the Grain EP
2002	"Captain Zero"	—	Non-album single
2003	"In and Out of Nowhere"	—	One Day Over
2003	"Goin' Downtown"	—	One Day Over
2004	"You're Making Me Sober"	—	One Day Over
