= Fur Patrol =

Rock band from New Zealand

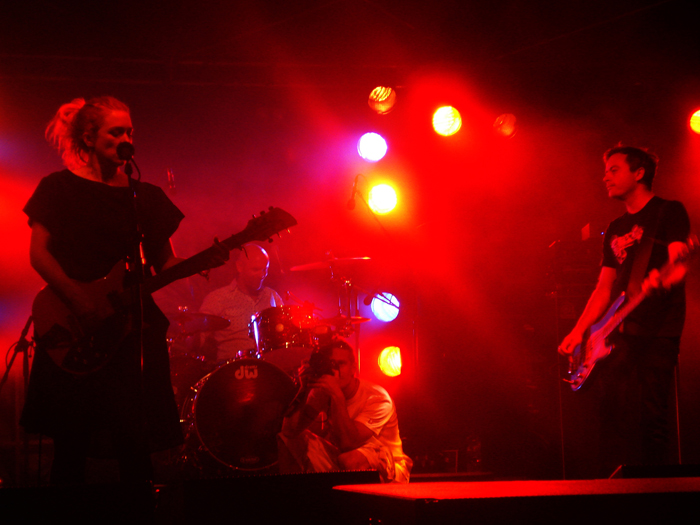
- Fur Patrol at Frank Kitts Park, Wellington, 2009

Background information
- Origin: Wellington, New Zealand
- Genre: Rock
- Years active: 1996–2008, 2016
- Labels: Wishbone; Warner; Universal; Tardus
- Past members: Andrew Bain; Simon Braxton; Julia Deans; Steve Wells

Fur Patrol were a New Zealand rock band, which formed in Wellington in May 1996 by Andrew Bain on bass guitar, Simon Braxton on drums, Julia Deans on lead vocals and guitar, and Steve Wells on lead guitar. Their debut studio album, Pet (September 2000) reached No. 7 on the Official Aotearoa Music Albums Chart. It provided their number-one hit, "Lydia" (2000) and two top 40 hits "Andrew" and "Spinning a Line" (both 2001). They relocated to Melbourne, Australia in 2001 and issued their second studio album, Collider (2003). In the following year, Wells left Fur Patrol. The three-piece line-up released a third album, Local Kid (2008) before disbanding. The group undertook a reunion tour in 2016.

== History ==
Fur Patrol were formed in Wellington on 15 May 1996. Founders were Andrew Bain on bass guitar and keyboards, Simon Braxton on drums, percussion, theremin and backing vocals, Julia Deans on lead vocals, guitars, keyboards and violin, and Steve Wells on lead guitar and backing vocals. Wellington schoolmates, Bain and Wells had worked together in different bands since 1990, including Svelte. Braxton had jammed with Christchurch-born Deans early in 1996. Deans decided to move on from her covers band, Banshee Reel, and organised for Bain, Braxton and Wells to join her in recording demos of original material. Deans provided the band's name, Fur Patrol, from a hair removal ad.

The demos were played on radio in Wellington, Australia's Triple J and Ottawa's college stations. Their first extended play, Starlifter, with six tracks, was released on the independent Wellington label Wishbone in 1998. It peaked at No. 17 on the Official Aotearoa Music Singles Chart. They provided a music video for the EP's track "Dominoes". Shaun Chait of NZ Musician observed, they "have always had that all important edge. Their gigs have always been bigger, their songs better – and they've always impressed the right people." At the 1999 bNet NZ Music Awards the EP won Best Independent Release and Deans was named Female Fox.

Their debut studio album Pet was produced by David Long, and was released in September 2000, also on Wishbone Records. It peaked at No. 7 on the Official Aotearoa Music Albums Chart and was accredited double platinum for shipment of 30,000 units. It was promoted by a New Zealand tour with support acts, Weta and Shihad. Pet provided five singles, with the third "Lydia" (October 2000) reaching number one. Two other singles, "Andrew" and "Spinning a Line" (both 2001), peaked in the top 40. At the 2001 Tui New Zealand Music Awards, they won four categories: Single of the Year ("Lydia"), Top Female Vocalist (Deans), Best Songwriter ("Lydia" by Deans) and Best Producer (David Long for Pet).

In March 2001 Fur Patrol relocated to Melbourne, Australia. Their independent label became unstable and they had contractual problems with WEA, which Deans recalled was a "phooey, absolutely stinky banana deal". In early 2002 they supported Machine Gun Fellatio and Waikiki on an Australian tour and followed with shows backing Jebediah. They were signed to record with Universal Music Australia. Their second album, Collider, was released in New Zealand in September 2003, and Australia in April the next year. The album was produced by British-born Mark Wallis, recorded in Melbourne's Sing Sing studios and mastered by Chris Blair at Abbey Road Studios, London. It reached No. 31 in New Zealand and No. 20 on the ARIA Hitseekers albums chart. It has a "rawer, noisier attitude" than Pet, as the group were "tight and they pushed the rock pedal a bit harder." Norman Stormin of Fasterlounder.com.au observed, it's "full of good-natured rock with a dash of soul." The first single, "Precious" (2003), which peaked at No. 18 in New Zealand, was heavier and darker than their earlier work. Its music video showed band members collecting fan's ears, which was filmed in Hollywood. The track was used on Australian TV ads for Boost Juice. Undercover's Tim Cashmere felt its "unbelievably catchy hook will have you singing along as though it were an old favourite."

Fur Patrol became a three-piece when Steve Wells left in late 2004. The group released a four-track EP, Long Distance Runner, in May 2007 and their third full-length album Local Kid via New Zealand label, Tardus on 29 September 2008. It was recorded by Australian producer, Tony Cohen, but did not chart. Their songs had appeared on New Zealand family comedy TV series Outrageous Fortune with "Precious" in Season 3, Episode 6, "The Way to Breathe" Episode 15 (2007), and "Long Distance Runner" on Season 4, Episode 18 (2008). The group disbanded in late 2018, with periodic reunion shows of the trio line-up, including a New Zealand tour in 2016. Deans has had a solo career with two charting studio albums, Modern Fables (2010) and We Light Fire (2018), joined the Adults (fl. 2011) and collaborated with fellow artists.

== Members ==
- Andrew Bain – bass guitar, keyboards (1996–2008)
- Simon Braxton – drums, percussion, theremin, backing vocals (1996–2008)
- Julia Deans – lead vocals, guitars, keyboards, violin (1996–2008)
- Steve Wells – lead guitars, backing vocals (1996–2004)

== Live photos ==
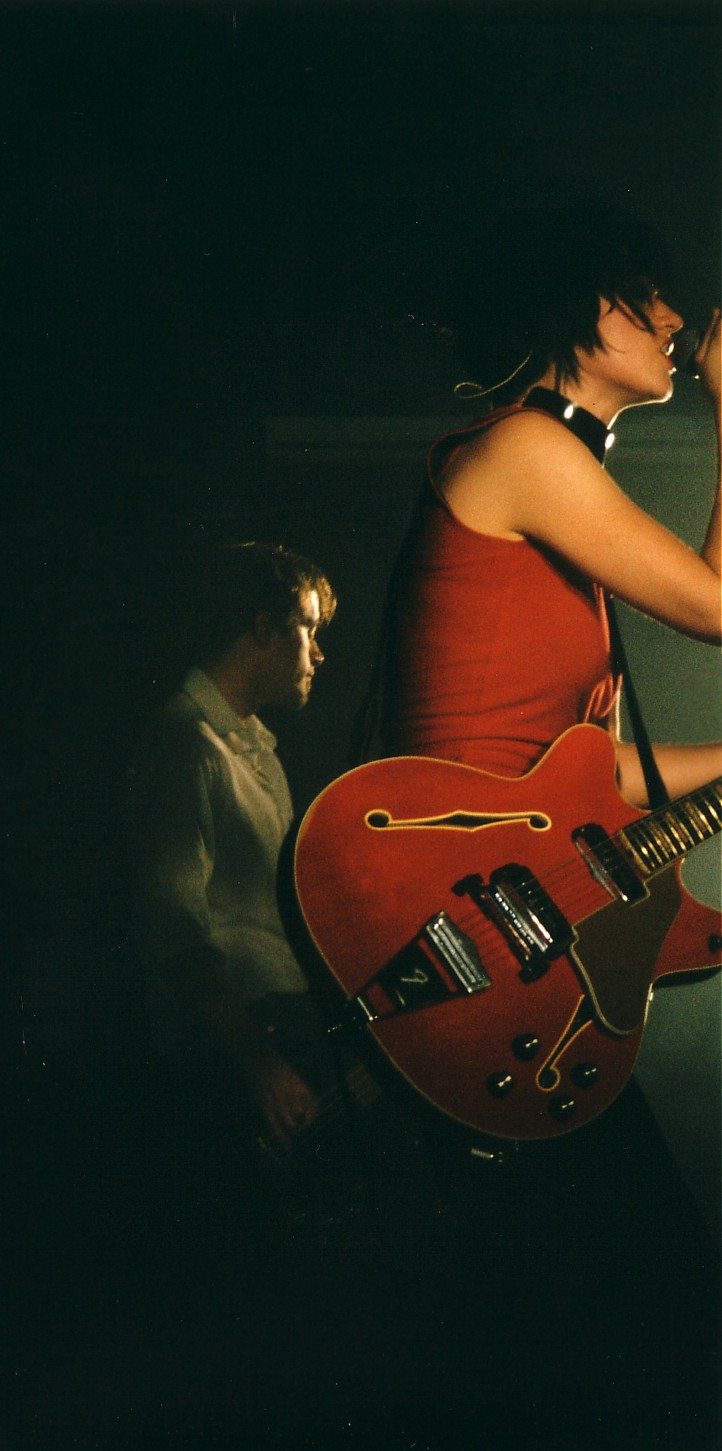
Andrew & Julia at the Starlight Ballroom on the By Hokey! It's Fur Patrol! tour, 2001

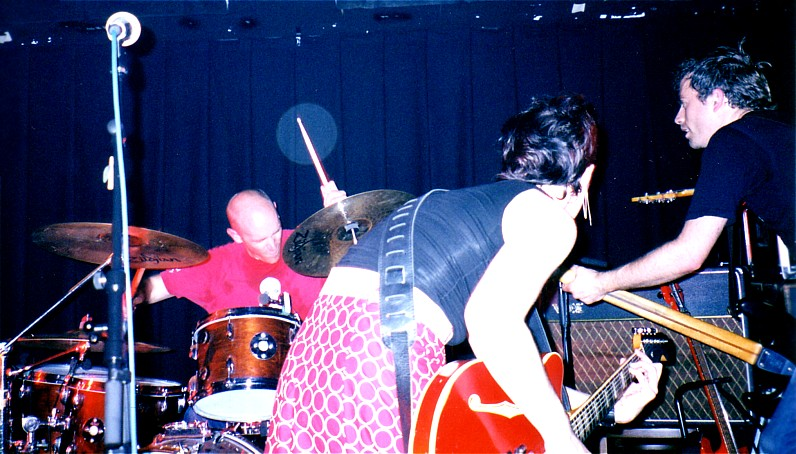
Simon, Julia & Andrew, live at Bodega in December 2002

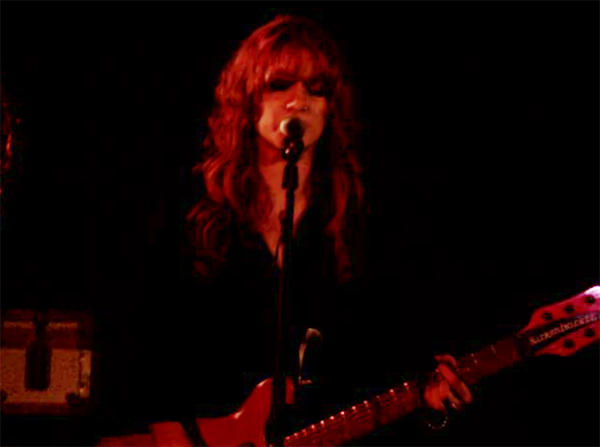
Julia, live at Happy in 2007 (supporting Long Distance Runner)

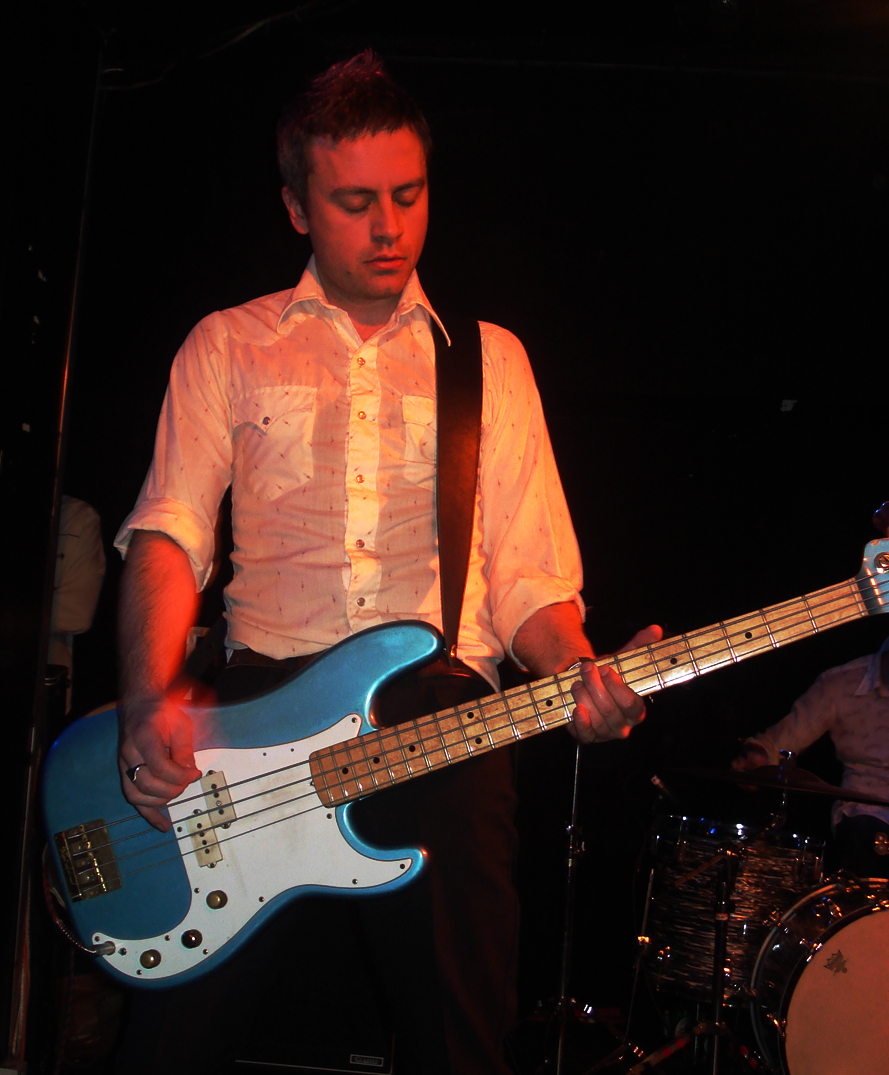
Andrew @ Bar Bodega, Wellington 22 August 2008

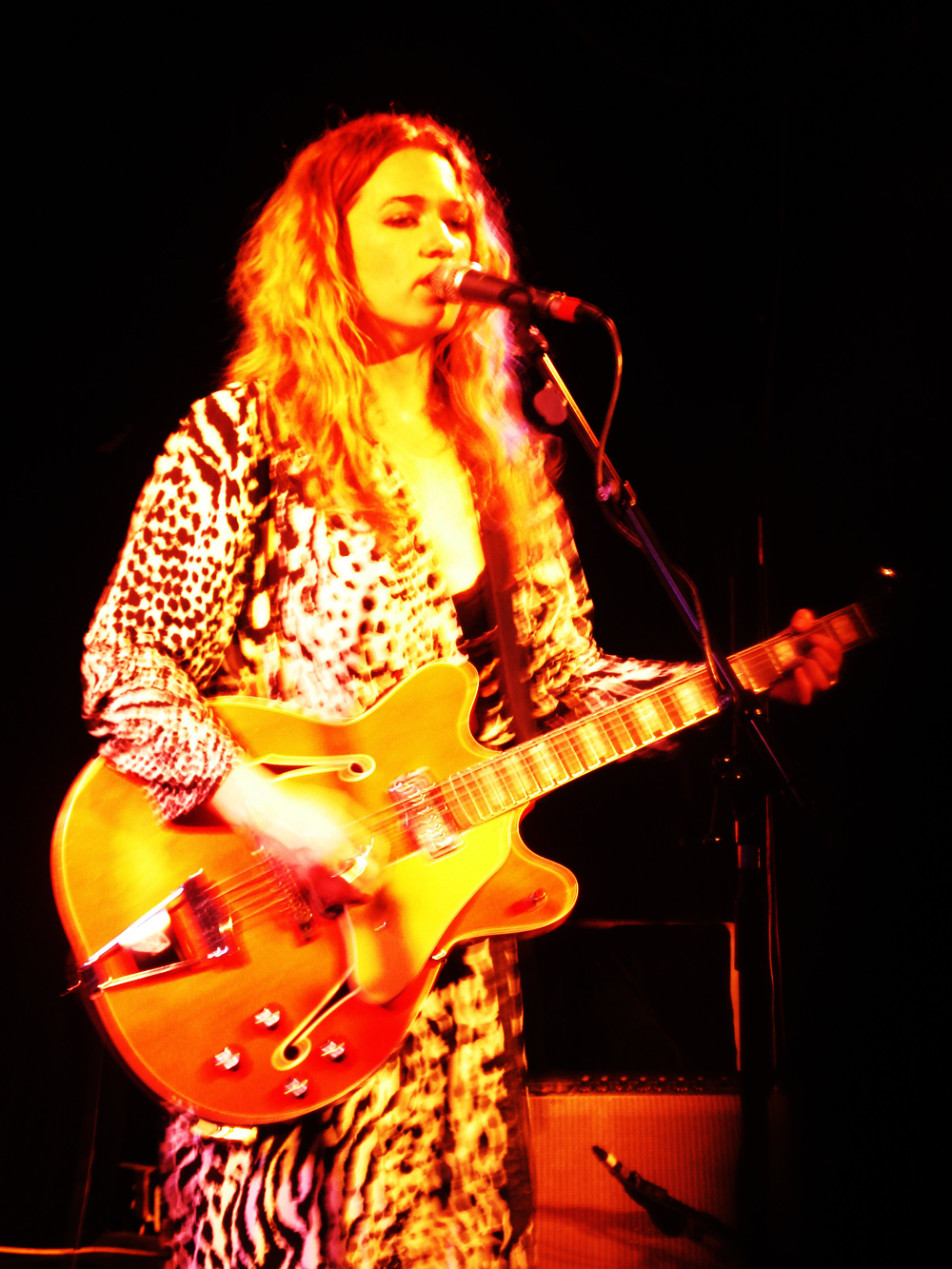
Julia @ Bar Bodega, Wellington 22 August 2008

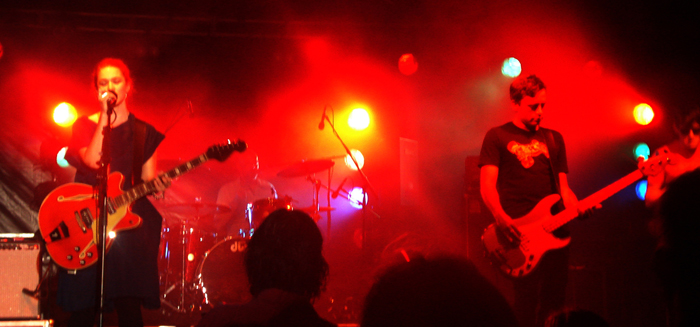
Fur Patrol @ Frank Kitts Park

== Discography ==
=== Studio albums ===
Year	Title	Details	Peak chart positions
Year	Title	Details	NZ
2000	Pet	Released: 24 September 2000; Label: Wishbone Music; Catalogue: 8573-85417-2	7
2003	Collider	Released: 26 September 2003; Label: Universal Music Australia; Catalogue: 5046705032	31
2008	Local Kid	Released: 13 October 2008; Label: Tardus	—
"—" denotes a recording that did not chart or was not released in that territory.

=== Extended plays ===
Year	Title	Details	Peak chart positions
Year	Title	Details	NZ
1998	Starlifter EP	Label: Wishbone Music; Catalogue: wishcoo81	17
2007	The Long Distance Runner EP	Released: 4 June 2007; Label: Tardus	—
"—" denotes a recording that did not chart or was not released in that territory.

=== Singles ===
Year	Title	Peak chart positions	Album
Year	Title	NZ	Album
1998	"Man in a Box"	—	Starlifter
1998	"Dominoes"	—	Starlifter
1999	"Beautiful"	—	Starlifter
1999	"Now"	—	Pet
2000	"Holy"	—	Pet
2000	"Lydia"	1	Pet
2001	"Andrew"	24	Pet
2001	"Spinning a Line"	40	Pet
2003	"Fade Away"	—	Non-album single
2003	"Precious/Enemy (Live)"	—	Non-album single
2003	"Precious"	18	Collider
2004	"Enemy"	—	Collider
2004	"Get Along"	—	Collider
2007	"Hand on an Anchor"	—	Long Distance Runner
2008	"Great Leap Forward"	—	Local Kid
2008	"Silences and Distances"	—	Local Kid
2008	"Hidden Agenda"	—	Local Kid
2009	"Little Fists"	—	Local Kid
"—" denotes a recording that did not chart or was not released in that territory.

== Awards and nominations ==
Year	Award	Category	Work	Result
1999	bNet NZ Music Awards	Best Independent Release	Starlifter	Won
1999	bNet NZ Music Awards	Female Fox	Julia Deans	Won
1999	bNet NZ Music Awards	Best Rock Release	Starlifter	Nominated
1999	bNet NZ Music Awards	Best Live Act	Fur Patrol	Nominated
1999	bNet NZ Music Awards	Best Video	"Dominoes" (directed by Greg Page)	Nominated
2001	New Zealand Music Awards	Single of the Year	"Lydia"	Won
2001	New Zealand Music Awards	Top Female Vocalist	Julia Deans	Won
2001	New Zealand Music Awards	Best Songwriter	"Lydia" (Julia Deans)	Won
2001	New Zealand Music Awards	Best Producer	Dave Long – Pet	Won
2001	New Zealand Music Awards	Best Engineer	Mike Gibson – Pet	Nominated
2001	New Zealand Music Awards	Best Cover	Andrew B White, Jade Weaver – Pet	Nominated
2001	New Zealand Music Awards	Album of the Year	Pet	Nominated
2001	APRA Awards	Most Performed Work in New Zealand	"Lydia"	Won
