= In the World of Light =

Studio album by Tiki Taane
- Released: 2011
- Genres: Electronica, dubstep

Tiki Taane chronology
Flux (2009)	In the World of Light (2011)

Singles from In the World of Light
- 1. "Summer Time" Released: 12 December 2010

In the World of Light is Tiki Taane's third studio album. Released in 2011, it is based upon electronica, involving numerous New Zealand dubstep and electronica artists.

The New Zealand Herald rated the album 4/5. It charted at #1 on the Official New Zealand Music Chart.

== Track listing ==
1. Summertime feat. DubXL
2. Soundtrack to Forever feat. Bulletproof
3. Light Years Away feat. Crushington
4. Nothing but Love feat. Truth
5. La Bicha Dub feat. Bebe
6. Light Years Away feat. Concord Dawn
7. A Beautiful Mistake feat. Moana & The Tribe
8. King of the Dubs
9. Bloodstone feat. Hollie Smith & Uekaha Taane
10. Come Fly with Me feat. Sambora
11. Chico feat. Charlie Te Marama
12. My Lion feat. Optimus Gryme
13. Kaitiaki feat. Uekaha Taane
14. In the World of Light
