= Robin Penhearow =

New Zealand cricketer

Robin Anthony Penhearow (born 5 October 1941 in Simla, India, died 8 August 2001 in Gisborne, New Zealand) was a New Zealand cricketer who played four first-class matches, mostly for Northern Districts, between 1964 and 1976. He also played for Poverty Bay in the Hawke Cup between 1965 and 1976.

A leg-spin bowler, he took his best figures of 4 for 103 on his first-class debut, playing for New Zealand Under-23s against Auckland in 1963–64. Earlier in the season he had taken 7 for 78 and 3 for 51 in a victory for Northern Districts Under-23s over Wellington Under-23s.
