= Roger P. Hill =

Royal Navy officer (1910-2001)

Roger Percival Hill
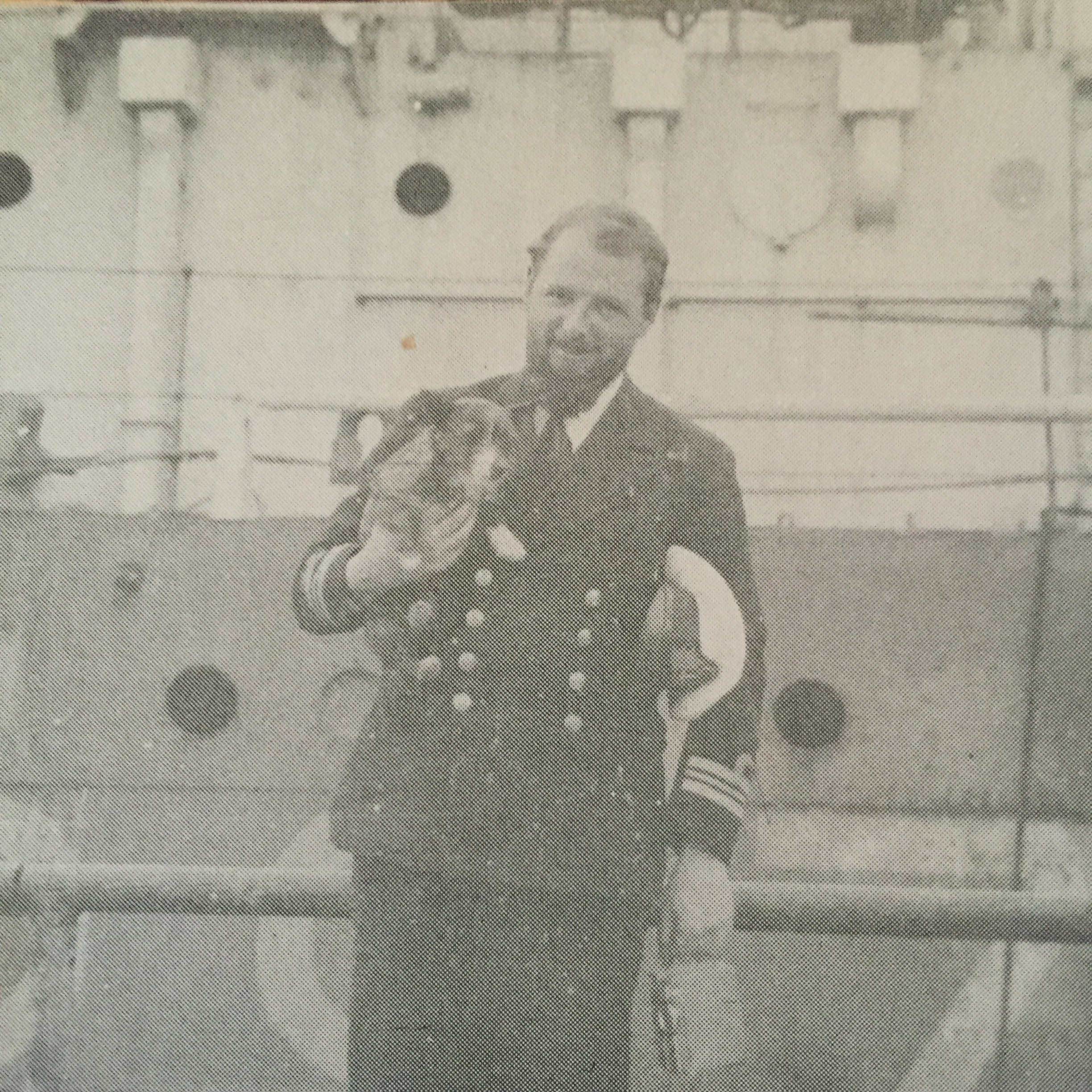
- Hill on board HMS Grenville
- Born: 22 June 1910; Cuckfield, Sussex, England
- Died: 5 May 2001 (aged 90); Arrowtown, New Zealand
- Military career
- Allegiance: United Kingdom
- Branch: Royal Navy
- Service years: 1927 – April 1946
- Rank: Lieutenant Commander
- Commands: HMS Ledbury; HMS Grenville; HMS Jervis
- Conflicts: World War II
- Awards: Distinguished Service Order, Distinguished Service Cross & Mentioned in Despatches
- Other work: Published: Destroyer Captain (1975 memoirs)

Lieutenant Commander Roger Percival Hill, DSO, DSC, (22 June 1910 – 5 May 2001) was a commander in many famous destroyers of the Royal Navy during the Second World War. Hill served in crucial theatres of the war, being present in the Arctic convoys, the Mediterranean Campaign and Malta Convoys, as well as playing a supporting role aboard HMS Jervis during the Normandy landings.

Hill's first command, HMS Ledbury played a part in the success of Operation Pedestal, the convoy to resupply the beleaguered island of Malta. The Ledbury propped up the crucial oil tanker SS Ohio after it was hit and successively torpedoed by Axis forces, and nursed it to reach the Grand Harbour, Valletta.

== Early service record ==
Hill was educated at Pangbourne College, before joining the Royal Navy in 1927. Between 1 September 1928 and October 1930, he served aboard the battlecruiser HMS Renown, with the Atlantic Fleet. Hill was confirmed as a sub-lieutenant on 16 July 1931, and then took a promotion course at Portsmouth between August 1931 and January 1932, serving in the Mediterranean aboard the battleship HMS Resolution up to June 1933. He was promoted to lieutenant on 1 December 1933. He served aboard the cruiser HMS Caradoc in China from 1933 to 1934. Hill was aboard the destroyer HMS Electra (part of the Home Fleet) from 1935 to 1937. He served again aboard HMS Hood between August 1937 and February 1938, later serving in the Mediterranean aboard the cruiser HMS Penelope. After serving for the eight months ending March 1940 aboard the minesweeping trawler HMS Tamora, Hill served as first lieutenant aboard the sloop HMS Enchantress. Having been stationed for three months on the mainly administrative Combined Operations Centre HMS Quebec II in Largs, Scotland, he was appointed as commander of HMS Ledbury on 30 December 1941.

== War service ==
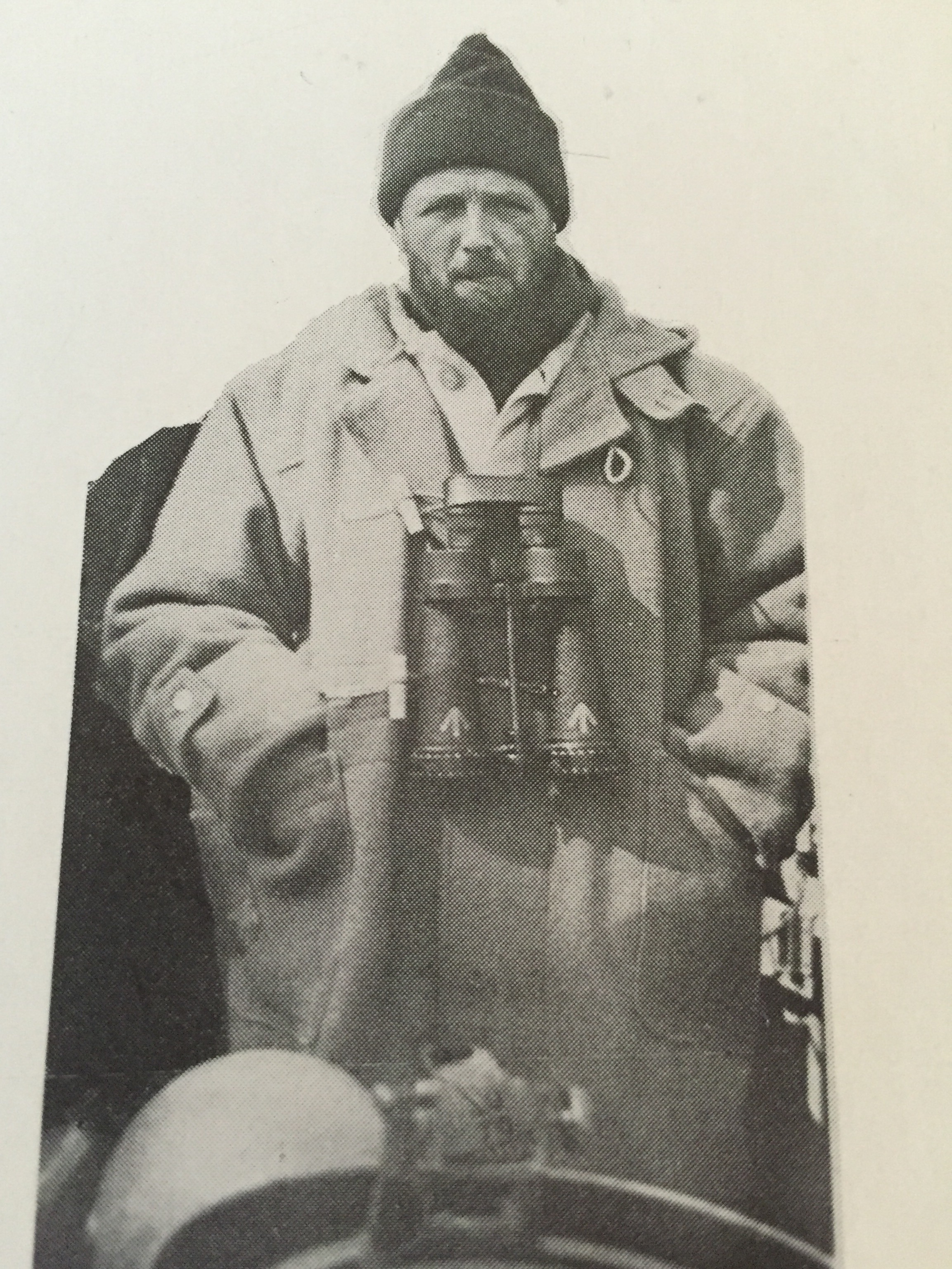
Lt. Commander Hill after PQ17

=== Commander of Ledbury ===
Hill escorted the Russian convoys PQ 15, PQ 16 and the unfortunate PQ 17, in which twenty-three out of thirty-four freighters were sunk after a signal to scatter was received from the Admiralty. Hill's Senior Officer on PQ 17, Captain Jack Broome, wrote that "after PQ 17 [Hill] had little faith in the shore staff who directed operations at sea. He was part rebel: in another age he would have made an excellent – if humane – pirate". After taking part in Russian convoy escort duty, the Ledbury was transferred to the Mediterranean, arriving in the Straits of Gibraltar to join the escort for Convoy Pedestal. In early August, thirteen merchant ships and the tanker Ohio, with an escort of aircraft carriers, battleships, cruisers, destroyers and submarines, left Gibraltar. The convoy was continuously assaulted by Axis airpower, U-boats and E-boats. After a few days at sea, the convoy was attacked by Luftwaffe Ju 88 dive bombers and torpedo bombers. During this attack, Hill took the Ledbury through the columns of freighters, crossing and reaching the head of the column to have "a better place to shoot at these planes".

During the attack that continued through the night, the Ohio's steering gear was damaged. Hill moved the Ledbury alongside the stricken tanker, and then led the Ohio back into the convoy. As the convoy approached Malta, the ships came under assault by Ju 88s, in an action which Hill himself described to be as "a mother and father of an attack". The freighter SS Waimarama, which was transporting fuel in drums on her upper deck, suffered a direct hit by a stick of bombs, blowing up in an inferno which engulfed surrounding ships and survivors alike. The flames blazed hundreds of feet in the air, and the Mediterranean was aflame "as far as the eye could see". As Italian aircraft dropped circling torpedoes into the water, Hill led the Ledbury into the surrounding inferno, where the destroyer's complement went over the ship's side with ropes to pick up survivors from the explosion. The intensity of the heat, and the amount of flames around the destroyer was so immense that as Hill leant over the side of his ship, he held on to his beard "to prevent it catching fire".

Again under frequent bombardment, the Ledbury, with the destroyers Penn and Bramham, nursed the disabled Ohio towards Malta, pushing her into its position for a tug, to take her into harbour – there the whole group of ships around the destroyer were greeted by bands playing, and people cheering and shouting. Hill received the signal "Well Done" from Prime Minister, Winston Churchill, and was awarded the Distinguished Service Order. The Admiral of the Fleet Sir Philip Vian wrote that Hill's "intrepidity and resource seemed to have no limit".

=== Later engagements ===
In 1943, Hill received command of the destroyer HMS Grenville. On the way from the English Channel to the Mediterranean, the Grenville successfully engaged a U-boat in the Bay of Biscay. For this action, Hill was awarded the Distinguished Service Cross.

Afterwards from early-september to mid-October 1943, the Grenville was deployed on the first ten missions of Operation Tunnel, aggressive night sweeps of the French coast, intended to sink Axis shipping trying to reach Biscay ports. The Grenville was present when the cruiser HMS Charybdis was sunk, leaving Hill as senior officer. He dealt with the aftermath, and gave evidence in a subsequent board of enquiry. Immediately after this action, the Grenville was ordered to the Mediterranean, where she was one of the supporting ships off the Anzio beachhead, whilst Hill was transferred to command the destroyer HMS Jervis, which was under repair after having her bows blown off by a guided bomb. The Jervis supported the Normandy landings in June 1944. By September 1944, Jervis's engines were heavily worn, and the destroyer took a long refit in Belfast. Hill was Mentioned in Despatches for his part in the Normandy landings. Hill was then sent to command an air station, where, as a passenger in an ambulance which crashed, he sustained serious head injuries which led to his being invalided out of the service. He was placed on the retired list on 30 July 1946.

== Later life ==
In 1965, after his first marriage ended, Hill and his second wife emigrated to New Zealand. Initially, he worked as a dock labourer, while he was writing his wartime memoirs, Destroyer Captain (1979). Afterwards, Hill taught navigation at Nelson Technical College, and farmed outside Nelson. Hill built a house, which he called "Jervis" and was a member of the Nelson Harbour Board. Latterly, he lived at Arrowtown, Central Otago.

Roger Hill died in New Zealand aged 91. His ashes were scattered over Grand Harbour in 2002.
