= Ladi6 =

Ladi6 MNZM
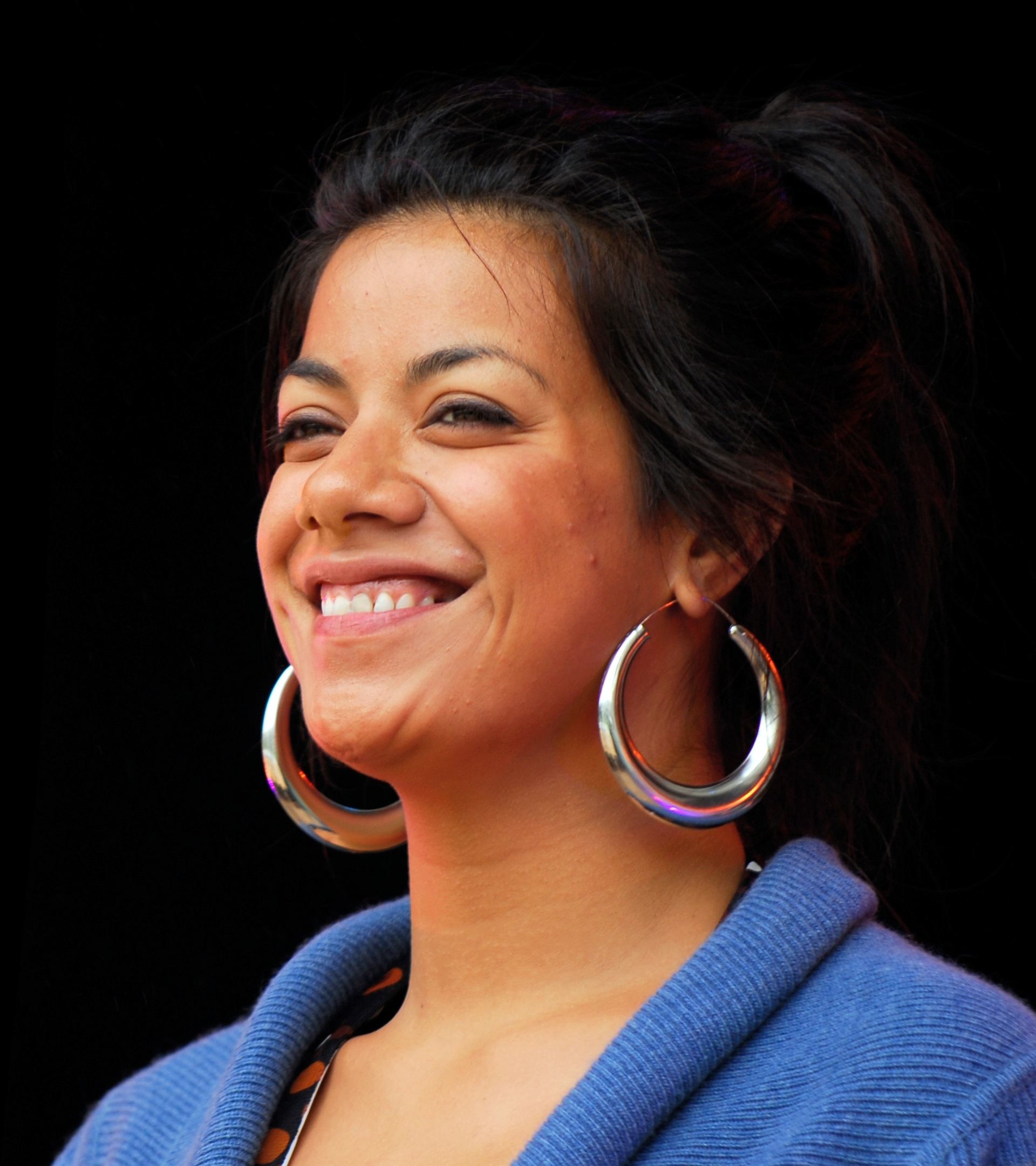
- Ladi6 at the Summerset Music Festival 2007

Background information
- Born: Karoline Tamati; 7 November 1982 (age 43); Christchurch, New Zealand
- Genres: Hip hop; neo soul; funk; soul; R&B; reggae
- Occupations: Singer-songwriter; rapper
- Years active: 1999–present
- Labels: Question Music, BBE, Eskapaden

Karoline Fuarosa Park-Tamati MNZM (born 7 November 1982), known professionally as Ladi6, is a New Zealand recording artist of Samoan descent. She spent six months living in Berlin and touring Europe in both 2010 and 2011. Her debut album Time Is Not Much debuted at number 4 on the New Zealand Top 40 Album chart. and her second album The Liberation Of... debuted at number 6 and was certified gold. Her single "Like Water" was certified platinum in June 2011. She has won many awards, including Best Female Solo Artist and Best Urban Hip Hop Album at the 2011 New Zealand Music Awards, the 2011 Taite Music Prize, and Best Urban/Hip Hop Album at the 2009 New Zealand Music Awards. The current line-up of the wider Ladi6 group is Ladi6, her partner Parks (a.k.a. Brent Park) and Julien Dyne.

Ladi6 was a spokesperson for the Not Our Future anti-smoking campaign. In the 2021 Queen's Birthday Honours, she was appointed a Member of the New Zealand Order of Merit, for services to music. In 2023, she received an Arts Foundation of New Zealand Laureate Award.

== Early life, Sheelahroc and Verse Two ==
Ladi6 was born in Christchurch on 7 November 1982, and raised in that city. She grew up in the eastern suburb of Aranui. Her family moved to Africa for a year and a half when she was a teenager, where she says she first started to write songs and play guitar. After she returned to Christchurch in the mid-1990s, she started her entertainment career as a break dancer. When she was 16 she formed her all-elements hip-hop crew which evolved into New Zealands first all-female hip-hop music group, Sheelahroc, with Sarah Tamaira (a.k.a. Voodoo Child) and Tyra Hammond in May 1998. Sheelahroc released the hit single "If I Gave U Th' Mic" and won Most Promising New Act at the 2001 bNet Music Awards.

After Sheelahroc broke up, Ladi6 went on to form Verse Two with Parks (Brent Park), Julien Dyne, Markus Vanilau, Elia Gaitau, Vanessa Mcgowan, DJ 4130, Matipi Turua, Redford Grenell, Vanessa Mcgowan, Nick Robertson (Shapeshifter) as well as a variety of guest musicians including MC Scribe. They released the singles "Danger" and "Gold" (featuring her cousin Scribe and produced by Mu of Fat Freddy's Drop). "Gold" went to Number 1 on the NZ Alternative charts in its first week of play on the bNet stations and was the 5th most played song on the bNet stations in 2003. "Danger" was re-issued as a bonus track on Time Is Not Much. and remixed by Manuel Bundy on Solephonics records. Ladi6 was nominated for Best Vocalist/MC at the 2003 bNet Awards and Verse 2 won a bNet Award for Best New Act in 2003. Verse Two supported international acts such as The Roots, De La Soul, 50 Cent, Gil Scott Heron, Erykah Badu, Jhene Aiko and Digable Planets.

The current line-up of the wider Ladi6 group is Ladi6, producer Parks (her partner), producer/keyboardist Brandon Haru, and sound technician Steve Roberts. Ladi6 has been called "New Zealand's answer to Erykah Badu".

Ladi6 evolved with dance crew "The Sixxes", a group consisting of Pasifika and Māori women. They create an inclusive and representative female presence on every stage they perform on.

Ladi6 has advocated for many health campaigns and has helped to profile certain issues by speaking out on social media.

She appeared on Songs From the Inside in 2015 alongside Troy Kingi, MC Scribe and Anika Moa, mentoring incarcerated women in Christchurch Women's Prison in songwriting.

Also in December 2014 saw the release of her cousin Oscar Kightley's Redbull documentary Ladi6 – Return to Africa, which follows Ladi6 on a journey of musical rediscovery to her origins, revisiting the times and places where she was inspired to become a musician in Tanzania, East Africa. The documentary captures the adventure for Ladi6, her partner and producer Parks, and their son, Philli Park-Tamati.

== Time Is Not Much ==
Ladi6's debut album Time Is Not Much was released independently in New Zealand in November 2008 and debuted at number 4 on the New Zealand Top 40 Album chart, staying in the top 40 albums for 10 weeks. The album was mostly produced by Parks and was released throughout Europe by London label BBE Records in July 2010.

== The Liberation Of... ==
Ladi6's second album, The Liberation Of..., was released in New Zealand independently in November 2010, where it debuted at number six on the NZ Top 40 Album Chart. It spent 34 weeks in the top 40 and was certified gold in July 2011. The single "Like Water" from this album peaked at number 9 on the NZ Top 40 Singles Chart, spent 22 weeks on the charts and was certified platinum in June 2011. In 2011 it earned Ladi6 the second-ever Taite Music Prize.

It was co-produced by Parks and Sebastian Weiss (a.k.a. DJ Sepalot) of the German hip hop group Blumentopf and features Myele Manzanza of Electric Wire Hustle, Toby Laing of Fat Freddy's Drop and German singer Esther Adams.

The Liberation of... was released in Europe on German label Eskapaden Records in May 2011. In London, Metro Magazine said Ladi6 was "One to Watch". "She knows how to make an impression – including a recent wow-inducing support slot for Gil Scott-Heron at London's Southbank Centre".

== Automatic ==
Ladi6's third album, Automatic, was released in 2013. Ladi6 and Parks travelled to the U.S. to work with music producer Waajeed. The album was done at Studio A recording studios in Detroit, with Grammy award-winning engineer Todd Fairall. They also did some recording in New Zealand at Revolver Studios in Waiuku.

Automatic was produced by Parks and Waajeed and features Ladi6 band members Julien Dyne and B.Haru. The album has guest vocal appearances by Scribe, Parks and Tyra Hammond, and Detroit MC Invincible.

Automatic debuted at number 3 on the New Zealand national charts and featured on many end-of-year (2013) 'best of' lists.

== Royal Blue 3000 ==
In 2017, she released her fourth album, Royal Blue 3000, which saw her and her producer partner win three New Zealand Music Awards: Best Female Artist, Best Producer, and Best Album.

== Collaborations ==
Ladi6 has collaborated with many New Zealand musicians and some International acts and bands, including Fat Freddy's Drop, Scribe, Shapeshifter, Jon Toogood, The Adults, Solaa, 4 Corners, The Opensouls, 50 Hz, Sepalot, Eva Be, Julien Dyne, and Christoph El Truento.

== Personal life ==
As well as producing most of Ladi6's music, her partner Brent Park (Parks) also provides backing vocals for many of her tracks. In 2004, Ladi6 and Parks had their first son. He is their only child.

She is the cousin of other prominent Samoan New Zealand musicians Scribe and Tyra Hammond of Opensouls, and director-actor Oscar Kightley.

== Discography ==
=== Albums ===
Year	Title	Details	Peak chart positions
Year	Title	Details	NZ
2008	Time Is Not Much	Released: 27 October 2008; Formats: CD, digital download; Label: Question Music	4
2010	The Liberation Of...	Released: 1 October 2010; Formats: LP, CD, digital download; Label: Question Music	6
2013	Automatic	Released: 16 August 2013; Formats: LP, CD, digital download; Label: Question Music	3
2017	Royal Blue	Released: 2 June 2017; Formats: LP, CD, cassette tape, digital download; Label: Question Music	
2025	Le Vā	Released: 1 June 2025; Formats: LP, digital download; Label: Question Music	
"—" denotes releases that did not chart or were not released in that country.

=== Charted singles ===
Year	Single	Peak chart positions	Album
Year	Single	NZ	Album
2011	"Like Water"	9	The Liberation Of...

== Awards ==
Year	Nominated work	Award	Result
2003	Verse Two	bNet Music Awards — Most Promising New Act	Won
2009	Time Is Not Much	Pacific Music Awards — Best Pacific Female Artist	Won
2009	Time Is Not Much	Pacific Music Awards — Best Pacific Urban Artist	Nominated
2009	"Walk Right Up"	Pacific Music Awards — APRA Best Pacific Song	Nominated
2009	Time Is Not Much	Pacific Music Awards/New Zealand Music Awards — Best Pacific Music Album	Nominated
2009	Ladi6	New Zealand Music Awards — Best Female Solo Artist	Nominated
2009	Time Is Not Much	New Zealand Music Awards — Best Urban / Hip Hop Album	Won
2011	The Liberation Of...	Pacific Music Awards/New Zealand Music Awards — Best Pacific Music Album	Nominated
2011	The Liberation Of...	Pacific Music Awards — Best Pacific Female Artist	Won
2011	The Liberation Of...	Pacific Music Awards — Best Pacific Urban Artist	Won
2011	The Liberation Of...	New Zealand Music Awards — Album of the Year	Nominated
2011	Like Water	New Zealand Music Awards — Single of the Year	Nominated
2011	The Liberation Of...	New Zealand Music Awards — Best Female Solo Artist	Won
2011	The Liberation Of...	New Zealand Music Awards — Best Urban / Hip Hop Album	Won
2011	The Liberation Of...	Taite Music Prize	Won
2014	Automatic	Pacific Music Awards — Trillian Trust Best Pacific Female Artist	Nominated
2014	Automatic	Pacific Music Awards — Niu FM Best Pacific Urban Artist	Nominated
2014	Ikarus	Pacific Music Awards — NZ On Air Best Pacific Music Video	Nominated
2014	Ikarus	Pacific Music Awards — APRA Best Pacific Song	Nominated
2014	Automatic	Pacific Music Awards — Auckland Council Best Pacific Music Album	Nominated
2018	Royal Blue 3000	New Zealand Music Awards — Best Female Artist	Won
2018	Royal Blue 3000	New Zealand Music Awards — Best Album	Won
2018	Royal Blue 3000	New Zealand Music Awards — Best Producer	Won
