= Modern Fables =

Studio album by Julia Deans
- Released: July 12, 2010
- Genres: Pop, folk
- Length: 36:16
- Label: Tardus

Julia Deans chronology
Modern Fables (2010)	We Light Fire (2018)

Modern Fables is the debut solo album by New Zealand singer-songwriter Julia Deans, former front-woman of the rock band Fur Patrol. Released by Tardus Records in 2010, the pop and folk album peaked at no. 12 in the New Zealand charts. Three singles were released from the album: "A New Dialogue," "The Wish You Wish You Had," and the title track "Modern Fables."

== Development ==
Deans had been heading in a new musical direction distinct from Fur Patrol's original rock sound for numerous years prior to the recording and release of the album, which was exhibited in the band's final few releases, such as "Hand on an Anchor" from 2007's The Long Distance Runner EP. After the band fell apart, she originally contemplated quitting music entirely, though encouragement from friends and family as well as her record company motivated her to create a solo album.

Modern Fables was recorded in Berlin, Melbourne, and Christchurch. All of the songs on the album were written by Deans, including "Little Survivor," which was penned during her time in Fur Patrol but never ended up on an album of the band's. Numerous notable New Zealand musicians contributed to the album, including Karl Kippenberger of Shihad, Aaron Tokona of Weta, and Dino Karlis of Dimmer.

== Release and promotion ==
Modern Fables received positive reviews upon its release. In a review for the Rotorua Daily Post, Tony Nielsen rated the album 4.5 out of 5, referring to Deans' voice as "amazing, from soft and fragile to high energy, but always driven by great melodies" and describing her as "exceptionally strong" lyrically. The New Zealand Herald gave the album a slightly lower rating, rating it 3 out of 5; although it criticizes some aspects of the tracks "Friend" and "Run," the review nonetheless notes that the album is an "impressive solo outing" and that "Deans' striking out alone might just be the making of her."

Deans embarked on a small New Zealand tour to promote the album, playing in Christchurch, Port Chalmers, Wellington, and Auckland in August 2010.

== Track listing ==
All tracks are written by Julia Deans.

No.	Title	Length
1.	"Little Survivor"	3:23
2.	"Modern Fables"	4:08
3.	"Recovery"	3:42
4.	"A New Dialogue"	4:30
5.	"High and Clear"	2:53
6.	"Skin (Everything Is Coming to a Halt)"	3:34
7.	"Friend"	3:28
8.	"The Wish You Wish You Had"	3:42
9.	"Run"	4:03
10.	"Ice Cream"	2:53

Source: Spotify.

== Charts ==
Chart (2010)	Peak position
New Zealand Albums (RMNZ)	12
