= Julia Deans =

New Zealand singer-songwriter

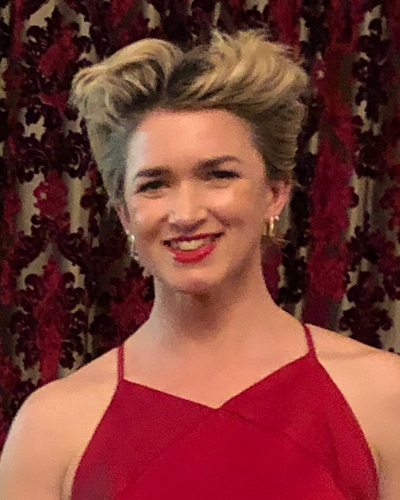
- Deans in 2020

Background information
- Born: 27 August 1974 (age 52)
- Origin: Christchurch, New Zealand
- Genres: Rock, pop, electronica
- Occupations: Singer, songwriter
- Instrument: Guitar
- Years active: 1993–present
- Labels: Wishbone Music, Universal Music Australia, Tardus Music

Julia Mary Deans (born 27 August 1974) is a New Zealand singer-songwriter best known as the lead singer of rock band Fur Patrol.

== Banshee Reel ==
In the early '90s, Deans joined Wellington-based Celtic rock band Banshee Reel. The group released two albums – Culture Vulture (1993) and An Orchestrated Litany of Lies (1995). Banshee Reel toured extensively around New Zealand and overseas. In 1996, after returning to New Zealand from a Canadian tour, Deans and Wellington guitarist Steve Wells decided to form a rock group, to become Fur Patrol.

== Fur Patrol ==
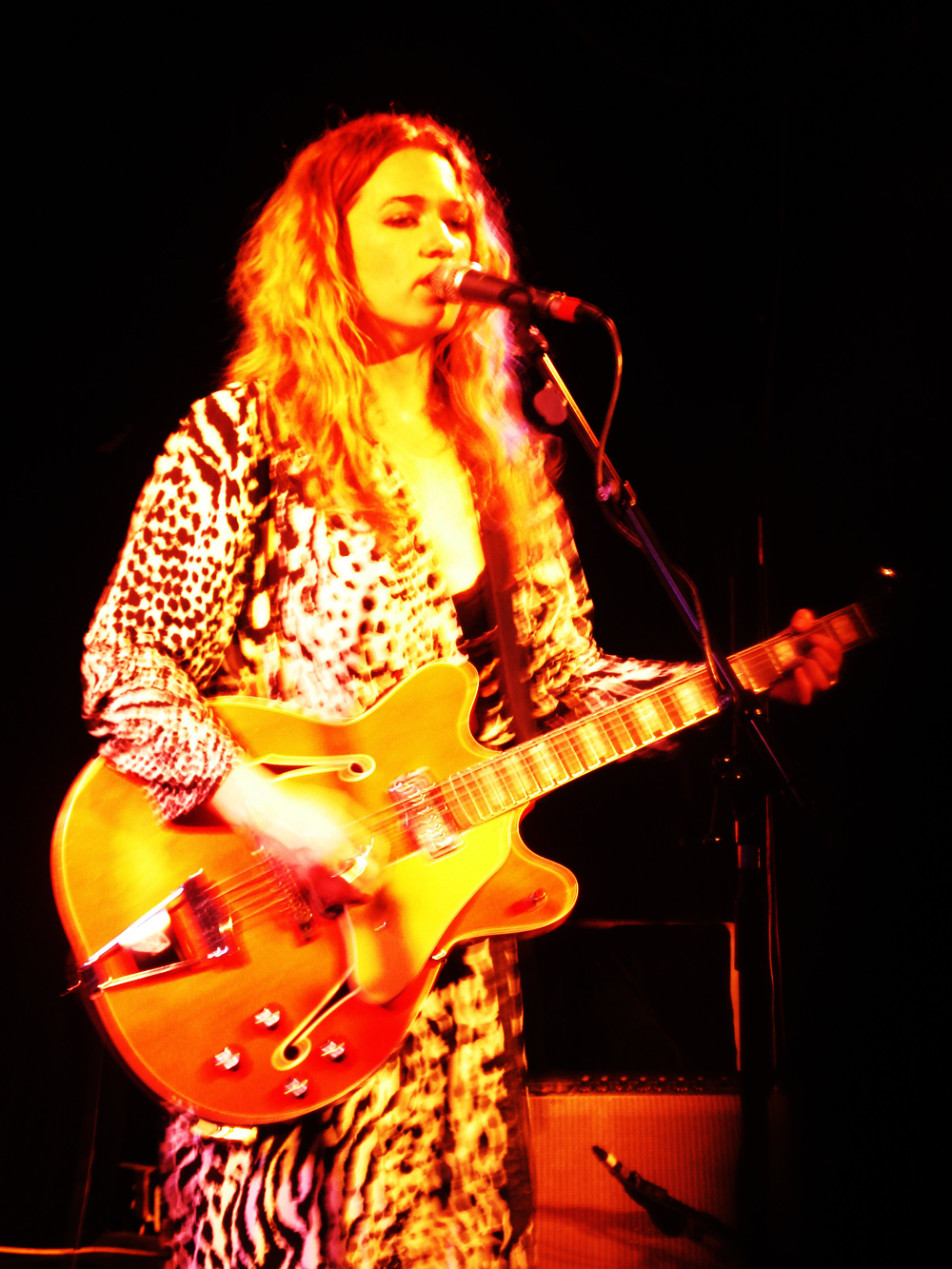
Deans performing at Bar Bodega, Wellington, August 2008

Fur Patrol released three albums – Pet (2000), Collider (2003) and Local Kid (2008) and had a number-one single with "Lydia" in 2000. The band moved to Melbourne in 2001 to focus on a wider Australian audience. After the lack of success with their third album, Local Kid, Fur Patrol went on hiatus.

== Solo career and The Adults ==
With several songs she had written over the years but thought unsuitable for Fur Patrol, Deans was encouraged by her record company to record a solo album. This became Modern Fables, released in 2010. It was well received and was short-listed for the Taite Music Prize, with the single "A New Dialogue" long-listed for the APRA Silver Scroll award.

Deans then became part of The Adults, a musical collaboration between established New Zealand musicians such as Jon Toogood, Shayne Carter, Tiki Taane and Ladi6. In 2011, the group released a self-titled album, which was nominated for Album of the Year at the 2012 New Zealand Music Awards.

In 2012, Deans released a new single, "Broken Home". She also embarked on a theatrical project, starring with Jon Toogood in Silo Theatre's production of Brel: The Words and Music of Jacques Brel.

In 2013, Deans performed at the Taite Music Prize ceremony in April. Later in the year, Deans and Anika Moa recorded a cover version of "2000 Miles" for the charity album Starship Christmas Album 2013.

== Discography ==
=== Albums ===
| Year | Title | Details | Peak chart positions |
| Year | Title | Details | NZ |
|---|---|---|---|
| 2010 | A New Dialogue EP | Released: 9 March 2010; Format: Digital download; Label: Tardus Music | — |
| 2010 | Modern Fables | Released: 4 July 2010; Formats: CD/digital download; Label: Tardus Music | 12 |
| 2018 | We Light Fire | Released: 11 May 2018; Formats: CD/digital download; Label: Tardus Music | 29 |
"—" denotes releases that did not chart or were not released in that country.

==== With Banshee Reel ====
- Culture Vulture (1993)
- An Orchestrated Litany of Lies (1995)
- "Lament" (1995) NZ: #42

==== With Fur Patrol ====
- Pet (2000) Wishbone Music
- Collider (2003) Universal Music Australia
- Local Kid (2008) Tardus Music

==== With The Adults ====
- The Adults (2011) Warner Music NZ

=== Singles ===
| Year | Single | Peak chart positions | Album |
| Year | Single | NZ | Album |
|---|---|---|---|
| 2011 | "The Only Thing" (with TokyoStreetGang) | — | Non-album single |
| 2012 | "Not Given Lightly" (Various artists) | — | Non-album single |
| 2012 | "Broken Home" | — | Non-album single |
| 2015 | "Team, Ball, Player, Thing" (#KiwisCureBatten featuring Lorde, Kimbra, Brooke Fraser, et al.) | — | Non-album single |
"—" denotes releases that did not chart or were not released in that country.

=== Music videos ===
| Year | Music video | Director(s) |
|---|---|---|
| 2010 | "A New Dialogue" | Greg Page |
| 2010 | "Modern Fables" | Mark Burrows |
| 2012 | "Broken Home" | Stephen Tilley |

== Awards ==
| Year | Award | Category | Work | Result |
|---|---|---|---|---|
| 1999 | bNet NZ Music Awards | Best Independent Release | Starlifter (Fur Patrol) | Won |
| 1999 | bNet NZ Music Awards | Best Fox | Julia Deans | Won |
| 2001 | New Zealand Music Awards | Single of the Year | "Lydia" (Fur Patrol) | Won |
| 2001 | New Zealand Music Awards | Best Female Vocalist | Julia Deans | Won |
| 2001 | New Zealand Music Awards | Best Songwriter | "Lydia" | Won |
| 2001 | New Zealand Music Awards | Album of the Year | Pet (Fur Patrol) | Nominated |
| 2001 | APRA Awards | Most Performed Work in New Zealand | "Lydia" | Won |
| 2010 | APRA Silver Scroll | Short list | "A New Dialogue" | Shortlisted |
| 2011 | Taite Music Prize | Short list | Modern Fables | Shortlisted |
| 2012 | APRA Silver Scroll | Long list | "Anniversary Day" (with Jon Toogood for The Adults) | Nominated |
| 2012 | New Zealand Music Awards | Album of the Year | The Adults (with The Adults) | Nominated |

== Personal life ==
Deans' grandfather was painter Austen Deans. Her great-great-great-grandmother was Jane Deans.
