= Tiki Taane =

New Zealand musician

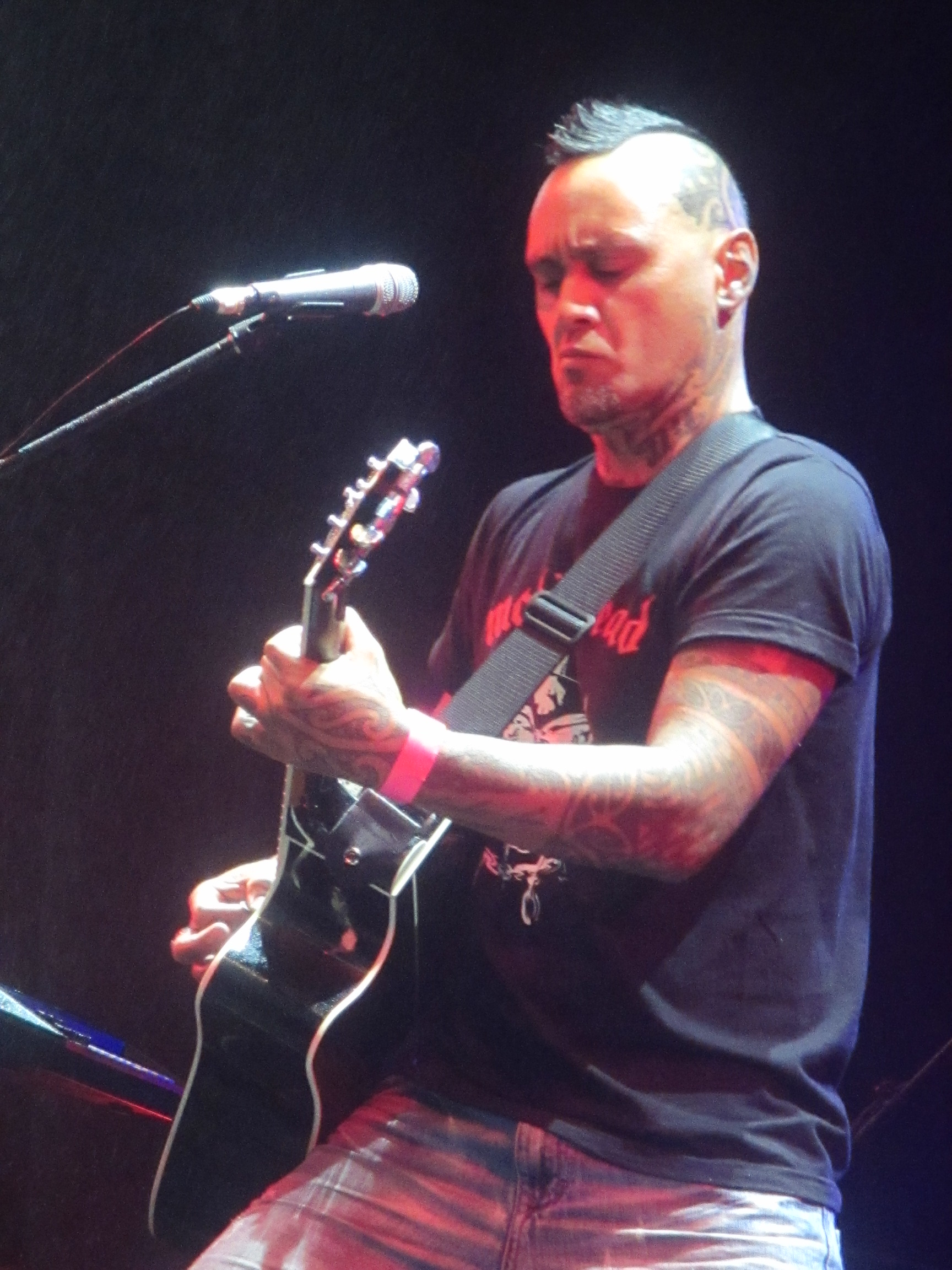
- Tiki Taane performing at Soundsplash 2016

Background information
- Born: Nathan Glen Taane Tinorau; 17 December 1976 (age 49); Christchurch, Canterbury, New Zealand
- Genres: Experimentalist; dub; drum and bass; dubstep; acoustic ballads
- Instruments: Acoustic guitar looping with FX and samples
- Years active: 1991–present
- Label: Dirty Dub
- Website: www.tikidub.com

Nathan Glen Taane Tinorau (born 17 December 1976), known professionally as Tiki Taane, is a New Zealand musician, experimentalist, musical activist, producer, and live engineer. He was a member of leading New Zealand band Salmonella Dub but left after eleven years on 1 January 2007 to pursue a solo career. His debut album, Past, Present, Future, was released on 22 October 2007 in New Zealand and has since gone two times platinum, achieving a number one single, "Always on My Mind", which became the first digital single to reach platinum sales and also held the record by staying in the NZ Top 40 Charts for 55 weeks. Taane is also the exclusive live sound engineer for New Zealand drum and bass act Shapeshifter since their first gig in 1999. Taane has also produced multi platinum albums for bands such as Six60, Shapeshifter, Salmonella Dub and Tiki Taane.

== History ==
In 1996, Taane became the live sound engineer for Christchurch-based dub group Salmonella Dub, who were gaining popularity in New Zealand's alternative music scene at the time. Prior to this, he had performed in local metal bands such as Cultivation and Braaspadeak, while studying audio engineering in Christchurch.

While touring with Salmonella Dub, Taane wrote the track "For the Love of It" in a hotel room. The band recorded it shortly afterward, and Taane began performing the song during their live shows. Released on the album Killervsion, "For the Love of It" peaked at number twelve on the Official Aotearoa Music Top 40 Singles charts and remained there for fourteen weeks, helping to launch his career as a vocalist. Killervision itself peaked at number seven and spent nineteen weeks on the charts.

As his stage presence grew, Taane began splitting his time between mixing the band's live sets and performing. By the early 2000s, he was regularly appearing onstage and transitioned into a frontman role.

Taane was recognised for his engineering work, winning the Best Live Audio Engineer award at the New Zealand bNet Awards in both 1998 and 1999. Salmonella Dub also received the award for Best Song for "For the Love of It".

Taane played his final show with Salmonella Dub on New Year's Eve 2006, concluding an 11-year association with the group. Around this time, the band had just completed a series of shows in Sydney, Australia with Roni Size and Roots Manuva, after which Taane approached bandmate Andrew Penman about taking a break.

He experienced what Stuff described as "fame and fortune as the front man for Salmonella Dub" before stepping away—a decision he later called "the hardest [he's] ever had to make."

Reflecting on his departure, Taane said, "I felt like it was time to take a break from Salmonella Dub." He described the period that followed as "very lonely" and "very intense," but added, "I have so much love and respect for [Salmonella Dub] because if it wasn't for them I wouldn't be where I am now. I wouldn't be here."

== Past, Present, Future ==
His debut solo record Past, Present, Future was released 22 October 2007 and debuted at #9. The album's first official solo single, "Always on My Mind", was released 28 April 2008. The song has been certified 2× Platinum and made it to #1 in New Zealand, knocking Chris Brown off the top spot after a seven-week reign. The song spent nineteen non-consecutive weeks in the top ten, including two weeks at number one, and a total of 55 weeks in the chart so far which holds the record for being in the charts the longest. "Always on My Mind" has also become the most successful single of all time in New Zealand, landing at number one on the Best of All Time Singles Chart, a chart that has been tracking singles since 1994. The title was previously held by "Bathe in the River" by Hollie Smith.

Past, Present, Future has also been certified Platinum in New Zealand and peaked at number four. The album was certified 2× Platinum after fifty-five weeks, selling over 30,000 copies. It has so far spent over sixty-six weeks in the chart.

== Use of music by Pete Bethune ==
Before taking out his vessel Ady Gil on an anti-whaling "cruise" to the Southern Ocean with an international marine conservation organisation, Pete Bethune noted that he had installed a large set of speakers, and intended to play songs like "Tangaroa" from Tiki Taane to the whalers, describing it as a "growling big sort of a song about the God of the Sea who looks after us."

== Legal issues ==
On 10 April 2011, Taane was arrested on charges of "disorderly behaviour likely to cause violence to start or continue" while performing "Fuck tha Police" by American group N.W.A at a gig in Tauranga. On his web site, Taane posted the message, "Freedom of speech is a human right." Tiki later stated that he "loves police" and was "not angry with them" even though the arrest goes against the NZ Bill of Rights Act 1990. Taane said that "the song is about corrupt police who abuse their position of power for their own agendas, and to be arrested for singing it is very ironic."

On 13 April Tiki told Marcus Lush on Radio Live that the lyrics often feature in his performances and his arrest came as a complete surprise, considering there was no trouble or violence within the concert. The arrest created a debate about freedom of speech that became political when Tauranga MP Simon Bridges said "Tiki Taane is a disgrace and I hope he never plays Tauranga again." Senior police stated they supported the arresting officers' actions, and are confident they acted appropriately. But in early September, the charges against Taane were dropped by police, calling the incident a "misunderstanding" after mediation; charges remained against promoter Patricio Alvarez-Riveros from the same incident. Taane later invited the Tauranga Police to perform with him at the 2011 Vodafone NZ Music Awards at Auckland's Vector Arena, where he was nominated for three awards and won, but they declined. Taane was instead given permission by the police to borrow 4 police-issued uniforms to be used in his awards performance in which Taane's friends dressed up to re-enact the controversial arrest.

== Music timeline ==
Year	Activity
1997	Features on Salmonella Dub album Calming of the Drunken Monkey
1999 – 2007	Becomes a member of Salmonella Dub
2003	Features on Rhombus's tracks "Clav Dub" and "Onward"
2003	Features on Concord Dawn's track "Don't Tell Me"
2005	Releases Dub Soldier on the Dub Conspiracy compilation
2006	Features on Concord Dawn's track "Never Give Up on Love"
2006	Remixes "Stay" by Blindspott
2007	Releases debut solo album Past, Present, Future
2008	Features on Antiform track "Got To Be You"
2008	Features on Bulletproof track "Dark Times"
2009	Features on State of Mind track "Kinetic"
2009	Releases remix album "Flux"
2009	Remixes "Sing It To Me" by Knights of the Dub Table
2010	Features on Bulletproof track "Soundtrack To Forever"
2010	Releases charity single "Starship Lullaby"
2010	Releases "Summer Time" featuring DUBXL, the first single off the album In The World of Light
2011	Releases "Light Years Away" featuring Crushington

== Discography ==
=== Albums ===
Year	Title	Details	Peak chart positions	Certifications
Year	Title	Details	NZ	Certifications
2007	Past, Present, Future	Label: Tikidub Productions; Catalogue: TIKI002; Released: Oct 2007	4	RMNZ: 2× platinum
2009	Flux	Label: Tikidub Productions; Catalogue: TIKI006; Released: 30 July 2009	11	
2011	In the World of Light	Label: Tikidub Productions; Catalogue: TIKI008; Released: 7 March 2011	1	RMNZ Gold
2014	With Strings Attached	Label: Tikidub Productions; Catalogue: TIKI010; Released: 31 January 2014	7	
"—" denotes a recording that did not chart or was not released in that territory.

=== Singles ===
Year	Title	Peak chart positions	Album	Certifications
Year	Title	NZ	Album	Certifications
2007	"Tangaroa – God of the Sea"	—	Past, Present, Future	
2008	"Always on My Mind"	1	Past, Present, Future	RMNZ: 6× Platinum
2010	"Starship Lullaby"	9	Non-album single	
2010	"Summer Time"	28	Non-album single	
2012	"Over the Rainbow"	12	Non-album single	
2013	"Enough Is Enough" (featuring Paw Justice)	21	Non-album single	
2018	"Ignite" (with Salmonella Dub)	— (Note: "Ignite" did not enter the NZ Top 40 Singles Chart, but peaked at number 19 on the NZ Hot Singles Chart.)	Non-album single	
2019	"Serendipity"	— (Note: "Serendipity" did not enter the NZ Top 40 Singles Chart, but peaked at number 34 on the NZ Hot Singles Chart.)	Non-album single	
"—" denotes a recording that did not chart or was not released in that territory.

=== Guest appearances ===
Title	Year	Other artists	Album
"Kei Tōku Ngākau Nei Koe / Always on My Mind"	2019	—N/a	Waiata / Anthems

== References and notes ==
- Tiki Taane inthemix.com.au Interview
- Tiki Taane Bebo Fansite
- Tiki Taane Profile, Muzic.net.nz
- Past, Present, Future at Real Groovy
