= Anika Moa discography =

Recording list

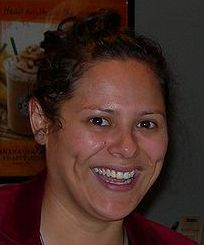
- Moa in 2006
- Studio albums: 4
- Singles: 12
- Music videos: 15
- Charity singles: 3

The discography of Anika Moa, a New Zealand pop singer-songwriter, consists of four studio albums, twelve solo singles, three charity singles, and fifteen music videos. Moa was a finalist in the 1998 national Smokefreerockquest, and was subsequently signed to record labels Warner Music and Atlantic Records. She recorded her debut album, Thinking Room, in New York City, which was released in 2001. It focussed on the genre of pop, with elements of folk music, and hosted the singles "Youthful", "Good in My Head", "Falling in Love Again" and "Mother". "Falling in Love Again" provided Moa with her first chart success in Australia, reaching number sixty-one on the Australian Singles Chart. Thinking Room topped the New Zealand Albums Chart and was certified double platinum by the Recording Industry Association of New Zealand (RIANZ). Stolen Hill, Moa's second studio effort, was released in 2005 and featured a darker tone, with Moa incorporating influences of rhythm and blues and swing music. The album was certified gold by the RIANZ.

In 2007 Moa signed to EMI Records and put out In Swings the Tide, which contains components of country music. It spawned four singles, including "Dreams in My Head", which peaked at number sixteen on the New Zealand Singles Chart. The album was eventually certified platinum in New Zealand. Love in Motion, released in 2010, saw Moa shift to a more pop rock and electropop environment. It produced the single "Running Through the Fire (Storm)", which briefly appeared on the New Zealand Singles Chart, as well as "Love Me Again" and "Blame It on the Rain".

== Studio albums ==
Year	Album details	NZ	Certifications (sales thresholds)
2001	Thinking Room: Released: 28 September 2001; Label: Warner, Atlantic; Formats: CD, digital download	1	NZ: 2× Platinum
2005	Stolen Hill: Released: 1 August 2005; Label: Warner; Formats: CD, digital download	6	NZ: Gold
2007	In Swings the Tide: Released: 8 October 2007; Label: EMI; Formats: CD, digital download	6	NZ: Platinum
2010	Love in Motion: Released: 5 April 2010; Label: EMI; Formats: CD, digital download	4	—
2013	Peace of Mind (With Boh Runga and Hollie Smith as AnikaBoh&Hollie): Released: 1 February 2013; Label: Civic Events; Formats: CD, download	2	—
2013	Songs for Bubbas: Released: 29 November 2013; Label: Diamond & Kowhai; Formats: CD, Download	9	RMNZ: 2× Platinum
2015	Queen at the Table: Released: 10 April 2015; Label: Diamond & Kowhai; Formats: CD, Download	16	—
2016	Songs for Bubbas 2: Released: 1 April 2016; Label: Diamond & Kowhai; Formats: CD, Download	1	—
2018	Anika Moa: Released: 5 October 2018; Label: Diamond & Kowhai; Formats: CD, Download	16	—
2019	Songs for Bubbas 3: Released: 22 November 2019; Label: Diamond & Kowhai; Formats: CD, Download	13	—
"—" denotes a title that did not chart.

== Singles ==
Year	Song	Peak chart positions		Album
Year	Song	NZ	AUS	Album
2001	"Youthful"	5	—	Thinking Room
2002	"Good in My Head"	22	—	Thinking Room
2002	"Falling in Love Again"	5	61	Thinking Room
2002	"Mother"	46	—	Thinking Room
2005	"In the Morning"	—	—	Stolen Hill
2005	"Wrestled with Your Angels"	—	—	Stolen Hill
2007	"Dreams in My Head"	16	—	In Swings the Tide
2008	"My Old Man"	—	—	In Swings the Tide
2008	"Standing in This Fire"	—	—	In Swings the Tide
2008	"Wise Man Say"	—	—	In Swings the Tide
2010	"Running Through the Fire (Storm)"	38	—	Love in Motion
2010	"Love Me Again"	—	—	Love in Motion
2010	"Blame It on the Rain"	—	—	Love in Motion
2011	"Give My Heart to You"	—	—	—N/a
2012	"Be Mine" (as AnikaBoh&Hollie)	—	—	Peace of Mind
2012	"Slipping Away"	—	—	Peace of Mind
2013	"Don't Really Care"	—	—	Peace of Mind
"—" denotes a title that did not chart.

=== Charity singles ===
Year	Song	NZ	Notes
2005	"Anchor Me" (with Kirsten Morelle, Che Fu, Milan Borich, Adeaze, Hinewehi Mohi, David Atai and Donald McNulty)	3	Cover of The Mutton Birds' song for Greenpeace, to mark the twentieth anniversary of the bombing of the Rainbow Warrior
2008	"Beside You" (with Opshop)	10	Cover of Dave Dobbyn's song for Raukatauri Music Therapy Centre
2010	"You Make the Whole World Smile"	—	Cover of Hammond Gamble's song for Cure Kids as part of Red Nose Day
"—" denotes a title that did not chart.

== Music videos ==
Year	Title	Director
2001	"Youthful"	Paul Casserly
2002	"Good in My Head"	Justin Pemberton
2002	"Falling in Love Again"	Justin Pemberton
2002	"Mother"	Justin Pemberton
2005	"Anchor Me" (as Greenpeace)	Tim Groenendaal
2005	"In the Morning"	Darryl Ward
2005	"Wrestled with Your Angels"	
2006	"Broken Man"	Madeleine Sami
2007	"Dreams in My Head"	Luke Sharpe
2008	"My Old Man"	Justin Pemberton
2008	"Standing in This Fire"	Justin Pemberton
2008	"Wise Man Say"	Kezia Barnett
2008	"Beside You" (as Anika Moa & Opshop)	
2010	"Running Through the Fire (Storm)"	Tim van Dammen
2010	"Love Me Again"	Tim van Dammen
2010	"Blame It on the Rain"	Marc Swadel
