= Aotearoa Music Award for Best Solo Artist =

Performing arts awards in New Zealand

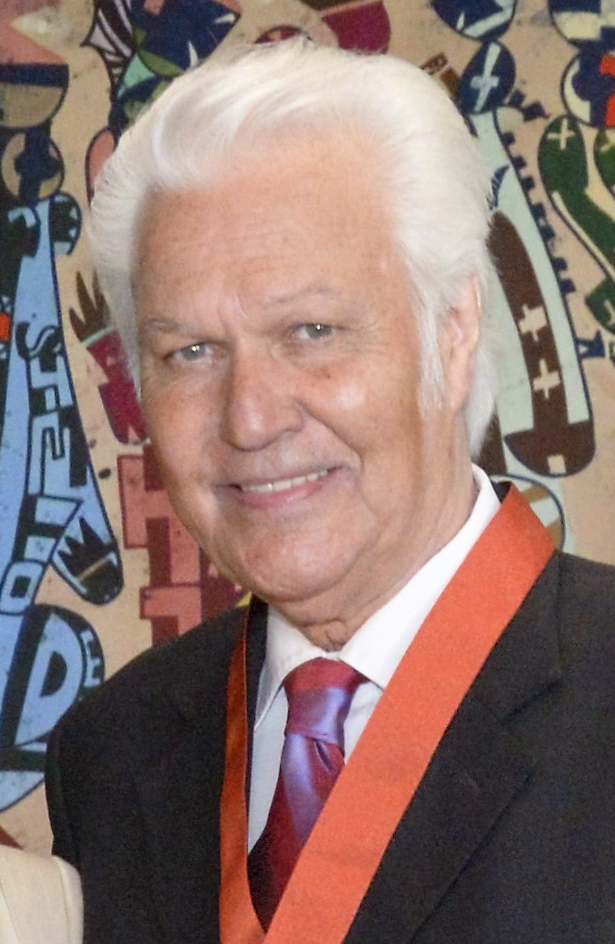
John Rowles was one of the two first recipients in 1978.

Best Solo Artist (Māori: Te Tino Reo o te Tau) is an Aotearoa Music Award that honours solo artists for outstanding work. The award can either apply to solo performers or a singer who performs with a band.

The award was originally divided by gender, with separate prizes going to male and female artists. The awards were first presented in 1978 at the relaunched New Zealand Music Awards. The awards were then called Top Male Vocalist and Top Female Vocalist. In 1985 they became Best Male Vocalist and Best Female Vocalist, then in 2004 they were renamed Best Male Solo Artist and Best Female Solo Artist. In 2017, following a revamp of the awards, the two awards were amalgamated into the one award called Best Solo Artist.

Dave Dobbyn has won the award six times and been nominated a further six times. Bic Runga has won the award four times and been nominated once more. Jon Toogood of Shihad has won the award three times and been nominated a further six times. The award has also been won by three members of the same family: brothers, Neil Finn and Tim Finn of Split Enz and Crowded House and Neil's son Liam Finn.

== Winners ==
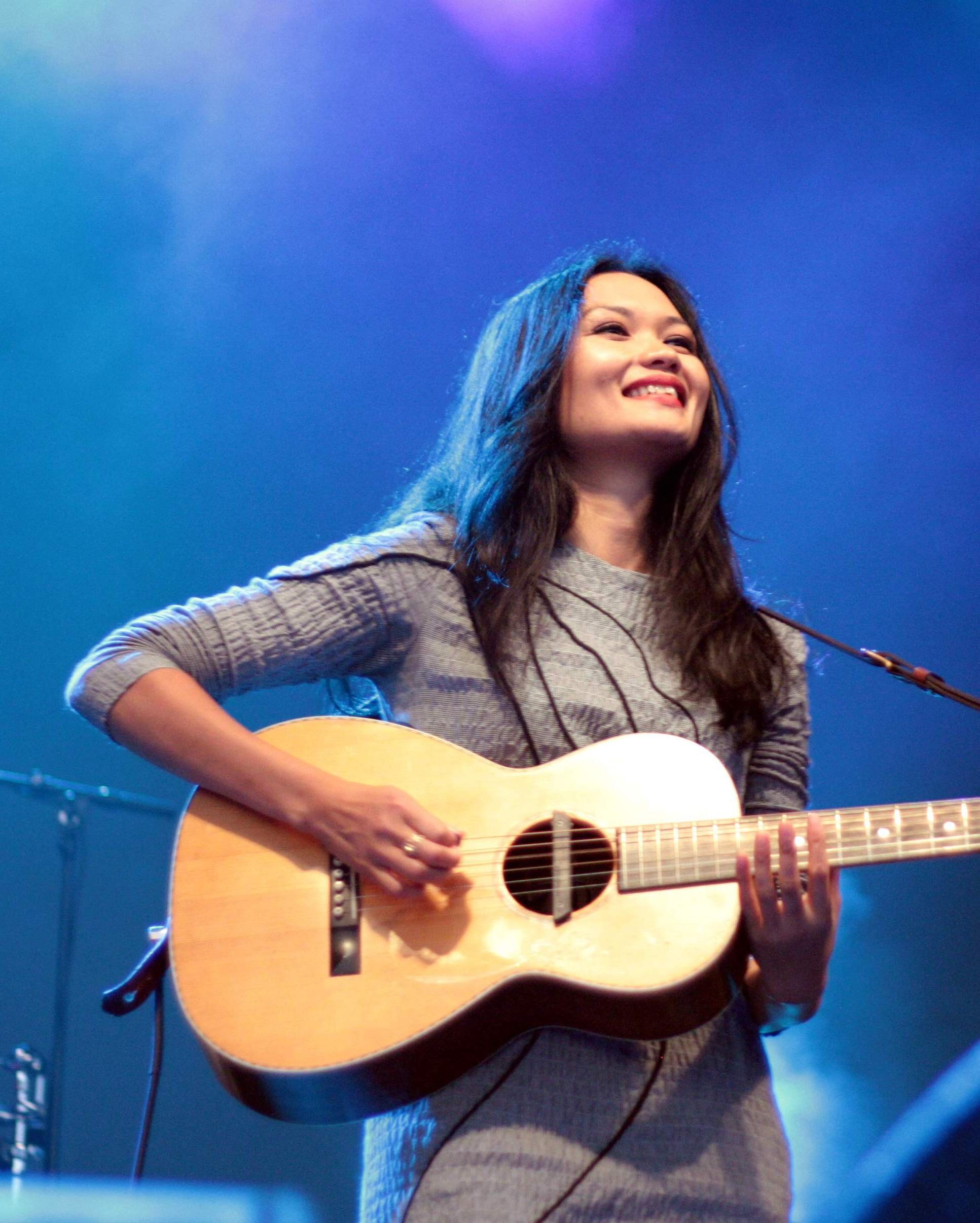
Bic Runga has won the award four times.

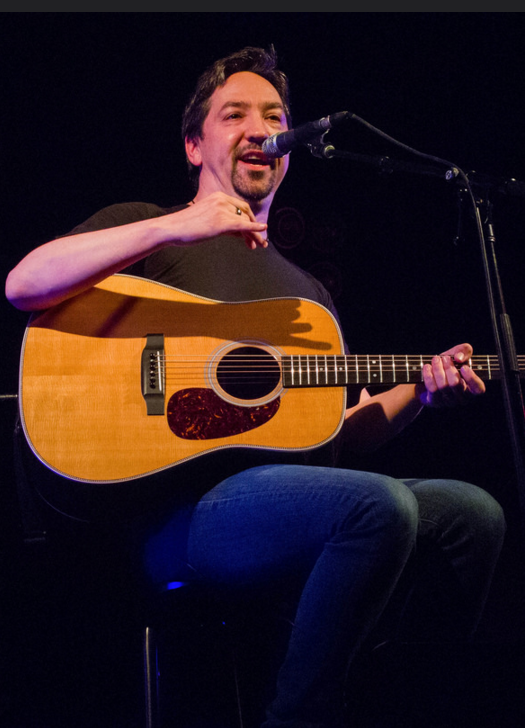
Shihad frontman Jon Toogood has won the award three times.

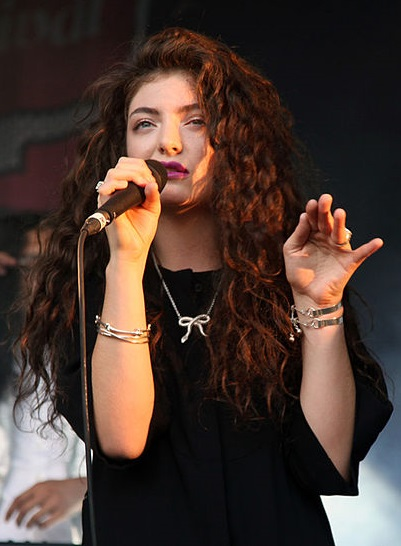
Lorde won in 2014 for her debut album Pure Heroine.

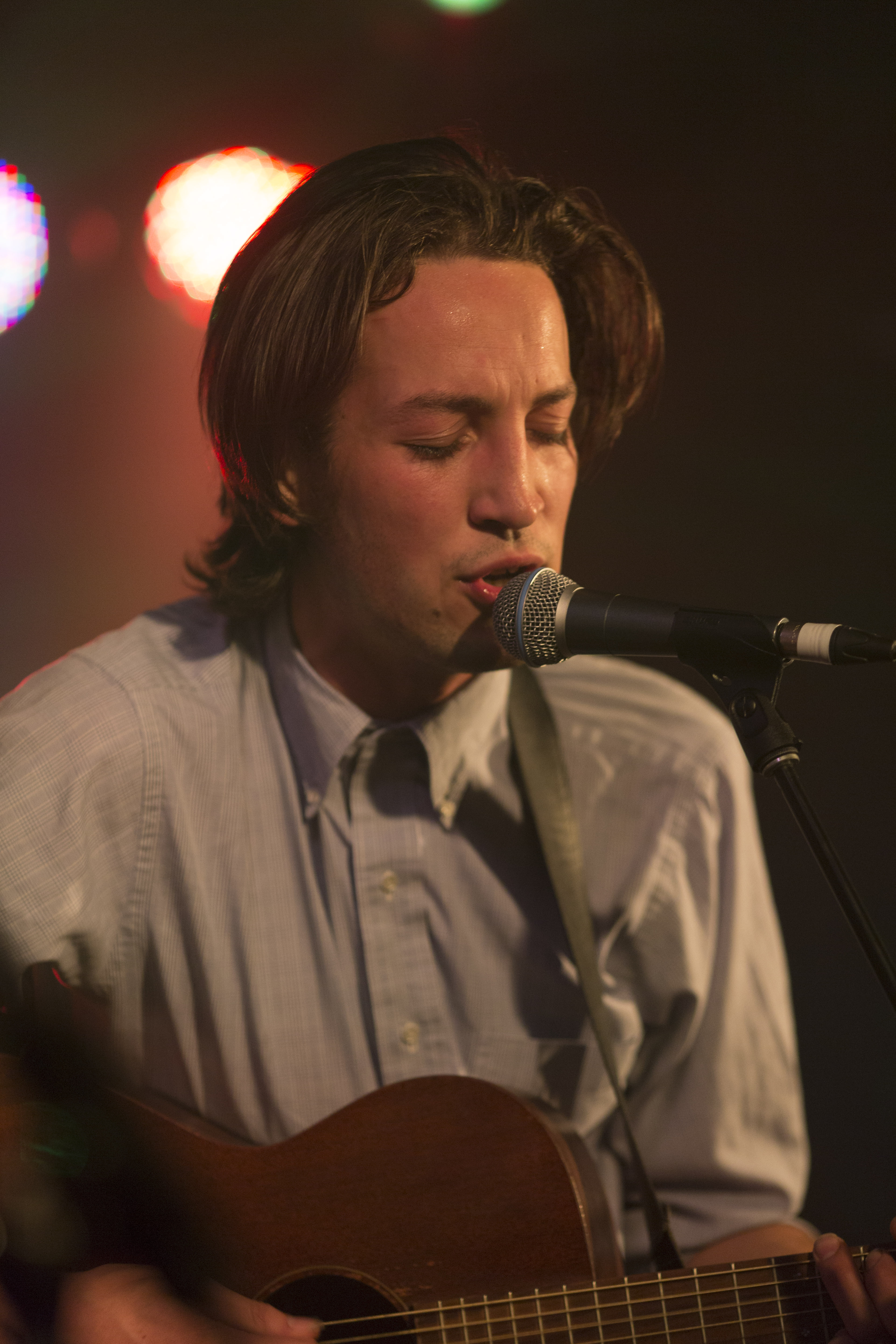
Marlon Williams has won the award three times.

=== Top Male Vocalist and Top Female Vocalist (1978 to 1984) ===
Year	Winner	Other finalists	Ref.
1978	John Rowles	—N/a	
1978	Sharon O'Neill	—N/a	
1979	Rob Guest	—N/a	
1979	Sharon O'Neill	—N/a	
1980	Jon Stevens	—N/a	
1980	Sharon O'Neill	—N/a	
1981	Dave McArtney (Dave McArtney & The Pink Flamingos)	Deane Waretini; Hammond Gamble	
1981	Suzanne Prentice	Jenny Morris; Tina Cross	
1982	Dave Dobbyn (DD Smash)	Malcolm McNeill; Murray "Monte Video" Grindlay (Monte Video and the Cassettes)	
1982	Patsy Riggir	Suzanne Prentice; Trudi Green (The Neighbours)	
1983	Dave Dobbyn (DD Smash)	Malcolm McNeill; Murray "Monte Video" Grindlay (Monte Video and the Cassettes)	
1983	Suzanne Prentice	Trudi Green; Patsy Riggir	
1984	Jordan Luck (Dance Exponents)	Andy Dickson (The Narcs); Andrew Fagan (The Mockers)	
1984	Patsy Riggir	Jodi Vaughan; Suzanne Prentice	

=== Best Male Vocalist and Best Female Vocalist (1985 to 2003) ===
Year	Winner	Album	Other finalists	Ref.
1985	Andrew Fagan (The Mockers)	—N/a	Malcolm Black (Netherworld Dancing Toys); Pat Urlich (Peking Man)	
1985	Margaret Urlich	—N/a	Patsy Riggir; Jacqui Fitzgerald	
1986	Pat Urlich (Peking Man)	—N/a	Malcolm McNeill; Sonny Day	
1986	Margaret Urlich	—N/a	Betty Monga; Annie Crummer	
1987	Dave Dobbyn	—N/a	Charlie Tumahai (Herbs); Martin Phillipps (The Chills)	
1987	Shona Laing	—N/a	Betty-Anne Monga (Ardijah); Patsy Riggir	
1988	Dave Dobbyn	—N/a	Charlie Tumahai (Herbs); Barry Saunders (The Warratahs)	
1988	Shona Laing	—N/a	Aishah; Annie Crummer	
1989	Tim Finn	—N/a	Howard Morrison; Barry Saunders (The Warratahs)	
1989	Margaret Urlich	—N/a	Moana Jackson; Aishah	
1990	Barry Saunders (The Warratahs)	—N/a	John Grenell; Barry Saunders (The Warratahs)	
1990	Margaret Urlich	—N/a	Patsy Riggir; Aishah	
1991	No awards held			
1992	Jordan Luck (The Exponents)	—N/a	Mikey Havoc (Push Push); Shayne Carter (Straitjacket Fits)	
1992	Fiona McDonald (Headless Chickens)	—N/a	Moana; Ngaire	
1993	Greg Johnson (Greg Johnson Set)	—N/a	Jordan Luck; Paul Ubana Jones	
1993	Annie Crummer	—N/a	Patsy Riggir; Shona Laing	
1994	Shayne Carter (Straitjacket Fits)	—N/a	Jon Toogood (Shihad); Chris Matthews (Headless Chickens)	
1994	Fiona McDonald (Headless Chickens)	—N/a	Annie Crummer; Shona Laing	
1995	Dave Dobbyn	—N/a	David Kilgour; Greg Johnson (Greg Johnson Set); Jon Toogood (Shihad)	
1995	Fiona McDonald (Strawpeople)	—N/a	Emma Paki; Stephanie Tauevihi	
1996	Jon Toogood (Shihad)	—N/a	Greg Johnson (Greg Johnson Set); Dave Dobbyn	
1996	Teremoana Rapley	—N/a	Sulata; Jan Hellriegel	
1997	Che Fu	—N/a	Jeremy Eade (Garageland); Jon Toogood (Shihad)	
1997	Bic Runga	—N/a	Emma Paki; Fiona McDonald (Strawpeople)	
1998	Jon Toogood (Shihad)	—N/a	Greg Johnson; Booga Beazley (Head Like a Hole)	
1998	Bic Runga	—N/a	Sulata; Annie Crummer	
1999	Neil Finn	—N/a	Dave Dobbyn; James Reid (The Feelers)	
1999	Betty-Anne Monga (Ardijah)	—N/a	Sulata Foai (Te Vaka); Alesha Siosiua (Urban Pacifika)	
2000	Jon Toogood (Shihad)	—N/a	Dave Dobbyn; Don McGlashan (The Mutton Birds)	
2000	Boh Runga (Stellar)	—N/a	Betty-Anne Monga (Ardijah); Zara Clark (Deep Obsession)	
2001	Nathan King (Zed)	—N/a	Jon Toogood (Shihad); Dave Dobbyn	
2001	Julia Deans (Fur Patrol)	—N/a	Renee Brennan (Tadpole); Libby Huirua (The Parachute Band)	
2002	Che Fu	Navigator	Neil Finn - One Nil; Tiki Taane (Salmonella Dub) - Inside the Dub Plates	
2002	Anika Moa	Thinking Room	Boh Runga (Stellar) - Magic Line; Hayley Westenra - Hayley Westenra	
2003	Che Fu	"Misty Frequencies"	Jon Toogood (Pacifier) - Pacifier; Te Awanui Pine Reeder (Nesian Mystik) - "For the People"	
2003	Bic Runga	Beautiful Collision	Anika Moa - "Falling In Love Again"; Kirsten Morrell (Goldenhorse) - Riverhead	

=== Best Male Solo Artist and Best Female Solo Artist (2004 to 2016) ===
Year	Winner	Album	Other finalists	Ref.
2004	Scribe	The Crusader	Greg Johnson - Here Comes the Caviar; Nathan Haines - Squire For Hire	
2004	Brooke Fraser	What to Do with Daylight	Bic Runga - Live in Concert with the Christchurch Symphony; Hayley Westenra - Pure	
2005	P-Money	Magic City	Savage – Moonshine; SJD – Southern Lights	
2005	Yulia	Into the West	Debbie Harwood – Soothe Me; Jordan Reyne – Passenger	
2006	Dave Dobbyn	Available Light	Don McGlashan - Warm Hand; Che Fu - Beneath the Radar	
2006	Bic Runga	Birds	Aaradhna - I Love You; Anika Moa - Stolen Hill	
2007	Tim Finn	Imaginary Kingdom	Paul McLaney - EDIN; Greg Johnson - Anyone Can Say Goodbye	
2007	Hollie Smith	Long Player	Brooke Fraser - Albertine; Hayley Westenra - Treasure	
2008	Liam Finn	I'll Be Lightning	SJD - Songs From a Dictaphone; Tiki Taane - Past, Present, Future	
2008	Anika Moa	In Swings the Tide	Aaradhna - Sweet Soul Music; Annabel Fay - Annabel Fay	
2009	Savage	Savage Island	Don McGlashan (Don McGlashan & The Seven Sisters) - Marvellous Year; Dave Dobbyn - Anotherland	
2009	Ladyhawke	Ladyhawke	Boh Runga - Right Here; Ladi6 - Time Is Not Much	
2010	Dane Rumble	The Experiment	Connan Mockasin - Please Turn Me Into the Snat; J. Williams - Young Love	
2010	Anika Moa	Love in Motion	Gin Wigmore - Holy Smoke; Hollie Smith - Humour and the Misfortune of Others	
2011	Tiki Taane	In the World of Light	David Dallas – The Rose Tint; Stan Walker – From the Inside Out	
2011	Ladi6	The Liberation Of...	Brooke Fraser – Flags; Julia Deans – Modern Fables	
2012	Ruban Nielson (Unknown Mortal Orchestra)	Unknown Mortal Orchestra	Bulletproof – Dub Me Crazy; Seth Haapu – Seth Haapu	
2012	Kimbra	Vows	Gin Wigmore – Gravel & Wine; Ladyhawke – Anxiety	
2013	Lawrence Arabia	The Sparrow	Ruban Nielson (Unknown Mortal Orchestra) – II; Willy Moon – Here's Willy Moon	
2013	Aaradhna	Treble & Reverb	Iva Lamkum - Black Eagle; Jamie McDell - Six Strings and a Sailboat	
2014	David Dallas	Falling Into Place	Liam Finn – The Nihilist; Stan Walker – Inventing Myself	
2014	Lorde	Pure Heroine	Ladi6 - Automatic; Tiny Ruins - Haunts	
2015	Marlon Williams	Marlon Williams	Stan Walker – Truth & Soul; Ruban Nielson (Unknown Mortal Orchestra) – Multi-Love	
2015	Gin Wigmore	Blood to Bone	Brooke Fraser - Brutal Romantic; Anika Moa - Queen at the Table	
2016	Maala	Composure	Avalanche City – We are for the Wild Places; Dave Dobbyn – Harmony House; Lawrence Arabia – Absolute Truth	
2016	Aaradhna	Brown Girl	Tami Neilson - Don't Be Afraid; Ladyhawke - Wild Things; Hollie Smith - Water of Gold	

=== Te Tino Reo o te Tau - Best Solo Artist (2017 to present) ===
Year	Winner	Album	Other finalists	Ref.
2017	Lorde	Melodrama	Aldous Harding – Party; Kings – Kings EP; Nadia Reid – Preservation	
2018	Marlon Williams	Make Way for Love	Julia Deans – We Light Fire; Kimbra – Primal Heart; Tami Neilson – Sassafrass!	
2019	The Beths	Future Me Hates Me	Beastwars - IV; Broods – Don't Feed the Pop Monster; L.A.B. – L.A.B. II	
2020	Benee	Stella & Steve	JessB – New Views; Nadia Reid – Out of My Province; Reb Fountain – Reb Fountain	
2021	TEEKS	Something to Feel	Anna Coddington – Beams; BENEE – Hey U X; Troy Kingi – The Ghost of Freddie Cesar	
2022	Tami Neilson	Kingmaker	Lorde – Solar Power; Reb Fountain – IRIS; Rob Ruha – Preservation of Scenery	
2023	No awards held			
2024	Marlon Williams		Avantdale Bowling Club; Fazerdaze; Kaylee Bell; Princess Chelsea; Stan Walker	
2025	Fazerdaze	Soft Power	Aaradhna – Sweet Surrender; Georgia Lines – The Rose of Jericho; Kaylee Bell – Nights Like This; Mokotron – Waerea; Stan Walker	
