= The Feelers discography =

- Studio albums: 5
- Extended plays: 2
- Compilation albums: 2
- Singles: 23

This is the discography of New Zealand rock band The Feelers.

== Studio albums ==
Year	Title	Details	Peak chart positions	Certifications
Year	Title	Details	NZ	Certifications
1998	Supersystem	Released: 9 August 1998; Label: Warner Music NZ; Catalogue: 3984238122	1	RMNZ: 5× Platinum
2001	Communicate	Released: 11 October 2001; Label: Warner Music NZ; Catalogue: 0927408062	1	
2003	Playground Battle	Released: 27 November 2003; Label: Warner Music NZ; Catalogue: 5046700882	6	
2006	One World	Released: 13 November 2006; Label: Warner Music NZ; Catalogue: 5101170352	1	
2011	Hope Nature Forgives Me	Released: 1 August 2011; Label: The Feelers	4	

== Compilation albums ==
Year	Title	Details	Peak chart positions
Year	Title	Details	NZ
2008	The Best: '98-'08	Released: 8 November 2008; Label: Warner Music NZ; Catalogue: 5186504292	1
2023	Reimagined - Greatest Hits	Released: 7 July 2023; Catalogue: Feelers 8	
"—" denotes a recording that did not chart or was not released in that territory.

== EPs ==
Title	Album details	Peak chart positions
Title	Album details	NZ
1995	The Leaving: Released: 1995; Format: CD	—
2007	ZM Live Lounge: Released: 21 May 2007; Label: Warner Music NZ; Format: Digital download	—
"—" denotes a recording that did not chart or was not released in that territory.

== Singles ==
Year	Title	Peak chart positions	Album
Year	Title	NZ	Album
1995	"The Leaving"	-	The Leaving EP
1997	"Pressure Man"	29	Supersystem
1998	"Supersystem"	15	Supersystem
1998	"Space Cadet"	8	Supersystem
1998	"Venus"	4	Supersystem
1999	"Pull the Strings"	9	Supersystem
2000	"World Away"	36	Non-album single
2000	"As Good As It Gets"	11	Communicate
2001	"Astronaut"	6	Communicate
2002	"Communicate"	13	Communicate
2002	"Fishing for Lisa"	16	Communicate
2002	"Anniversary"	31	Communicate
2003	"Larger Than Life"	16	Playground Battle
2004	"Weapons of War"	34	Playground Battle
2005	"The Fear"	13	Playground Battle
2005	"Stand Up"	17	Playground Battle
2006	"One World"	8	One World
2007	"On a High"	—	One World
2007	"Nothing's More Real"	—	One World
2007	"Never Let Me Down"	—	One World
2007	"Trying To Get By"	—	One World
2008	"Beautiful Feeling"	—	The Best '98 - '08
2008	"Beautiful Feeling" (Acoustic Mix)	—	Non-album single
2008	"Whoever Said"	—	The Best '98 - '08
2009	"Blue Skies"	—	Hope Nature Forgives
2010	"Right Here, Right Now"	—	Hope Nature Forgives
2011	"Snakes (Can't Fix Me)"	—	Hope Nature Forgives
2011	"Didn't Want To Fall In Love"	—	Hope Nature Forgives
2012	"Dasvidaniya"	—	Hope Nature Forgives
2014	"One Man Army"	—	Non-album single
2018	"I'm Alive"	--	Non-album single
"—" denotes a recording that did not chart or was not released in that territory.
