= Hinemoa Elder =

New Zealand youth forensic psychiatrist (born 1966)

Hinemoa Elder MNZM
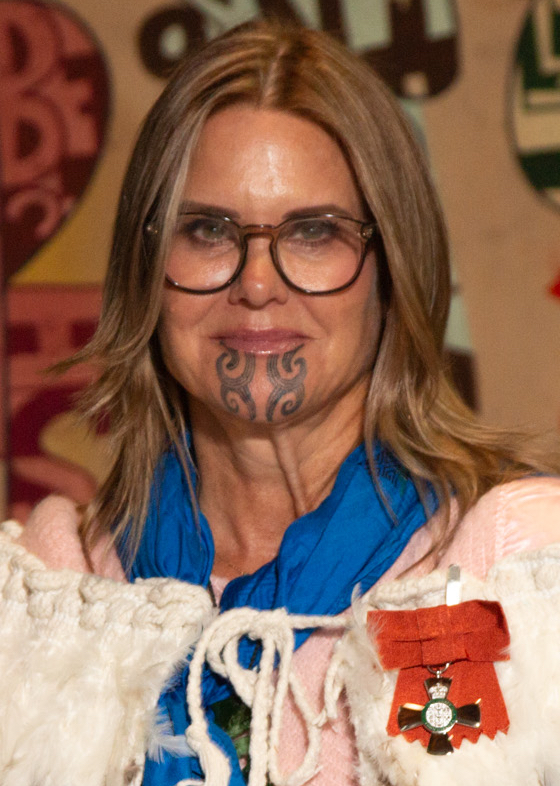
- Elder in 2019
- Born: 1966 (age 59–60)
- Education: Massey University
- Spouse: Paul Holmes (m. 1992; div. 1998)
- Scientific career
- Thesis: Tuku iho, he tapu te upoko. From our ancestors, the head is sacred. Indigenous theory building and therapeutic framework development for Māori children and adolescents with traumatic brain injury (2012)
- Doctoral advisors: Chris Cunningham; Mason Durie; Richard Faull

Hinemoa Elder MNZM (born 1966) is a New Zealand youth forensic psychiatrist and former television presenter, actress, and model. She is a professor in indigenous research at Te Whare Wānanga o Awanuiārangi, a fellow of the Royal Australian and New Zealand College of Psychiatrists, and sits on the Māori Advisory Committee of the Centre for Brain Research.

Before training in medicine she was a presenter on 3.45 LIVE! and The Bugs Bunny Show, children's television programmes on TVNZ.

== Career ==
Elder began her career in the early 1990s as a television personality and model. At the time known professionally as Hine Elder.

After her mother was diagnosed with breast cancer, Elder enrolled at the University of Auckland to study medicine. She graduated in 1999 and went on to specialise in child and adolescent psychiatry. From 2007 to 2011 she worked as a youth forensic psychiatrist in the Waikato, Auckland and Northland regions and completed post-graduate studies in forensic psychology. Her doctoral thesis, completed at Massey University in 2012, focused on the development of tikanga approaches for Māori children who experienced traumatic brain injury. In 2015 she was a participant in a neurological research think tank at the University of Deusto, Spain, which aimed to strengthen international collaborative research partnerships in the field.

Elder has served on a number of reference groups for the Ministry of Health including the expert advisory group of Blueprint II, which established the framework for New Zealand mental health service funding. She is a deputy member of the New Zealand Mental Health Review Tribunal and a specialist assessor under the Intellectual Disability Compulsory Care and Rehabilitation Act 2003. Elder is also a research associate of the Person Centred Research Centre, the National Institute for Stroke and Applied Neurosciences and is a trustee and director of Emerge Aotearoa, a non-governmental organisation.

=== Recognition ===
In 2014, Elder received a Health Research Council of New Zealand Eru Pomare Post Doctoral Fellowship which allowed her to extend the work of her doctorate. In 2017 Elder received the Innovation and Science Award at the New Zealand Women of Influence Awards.

In the 2019 Queen's Birthday Honours, Elder was appointed a Member of the New Zealand Order of Merit, for services to psychiatry and Māori.

Her 2024 book, Dear Moko, was shortlisted for the Elsie Locke Award for Non-Fiction at the 2025 New Zealand Book Awards for Children and Young Adults.

=== Publications ===
- Maea te Toi Ora: Māori Health Transformations, 2018 (co-contributor)
- Elder, Hinemoa (January 1, 2021). Aroha, Maori Wisdom for a Contented Life Lived in Harmony With Our Planet. London, England: Ebury Press. ISBN 978-1529107067. In 2025, the book was selected as one of the 180 most significant works of Māori-authored non-fiction.
- Elder, Hinemoa (2024). Dear Moko: Māori wisdom for our young ones. Penguin. ISBN 9781776953417.

== Personal life ==
Elder grew up in England with her Māori mother and New Zealand European father, returning to New Zealand when she was eleven. She is of English descent, and from Ngāti Kurī, Te Rarawa, Te Aupōuri and Ngāpuhi iwi.

Elder is the former partner, later wife, of the late broadcaster Paul Holmes and had a son, Reuben, with him. Holmes was step-father to Elder's daughter from a previous relationship, Millie Elder-Holmes.

Hinemoa Elder lives on Waiheke Island.

== Filmography ==
=== Television ===
| Year | Title | Role | Notes | Ref. |
|---|---|---|---|---|
| 1989–1990 | 3.45 LIVE! | Herself (host) | | |
| 1991–1992 | The Bugs Bunny Show | Herself (host) | | |
| 1992 | Homeward Bound | Louise Harvey | | |
| 1995 | Families: Good for Life | Herself (host) | | |
| 1995 | Corbans Fashion Collections: Spring/Summer 1995 | Herself (model) | | |
| 1995 | Arriving Early | Herself (narrator) | | |
| 2022 | Wellington Paranormal | Maaka's wife | | |

=== Music videos ===
| Year | Song title | Artist | Ref. |
|---|---|---|---|
| 1992 | "You Make the Whole World Smile" | The Red Nose Band featuring Hammond Gamble | |
