= James Reid (New Zealand musician) =

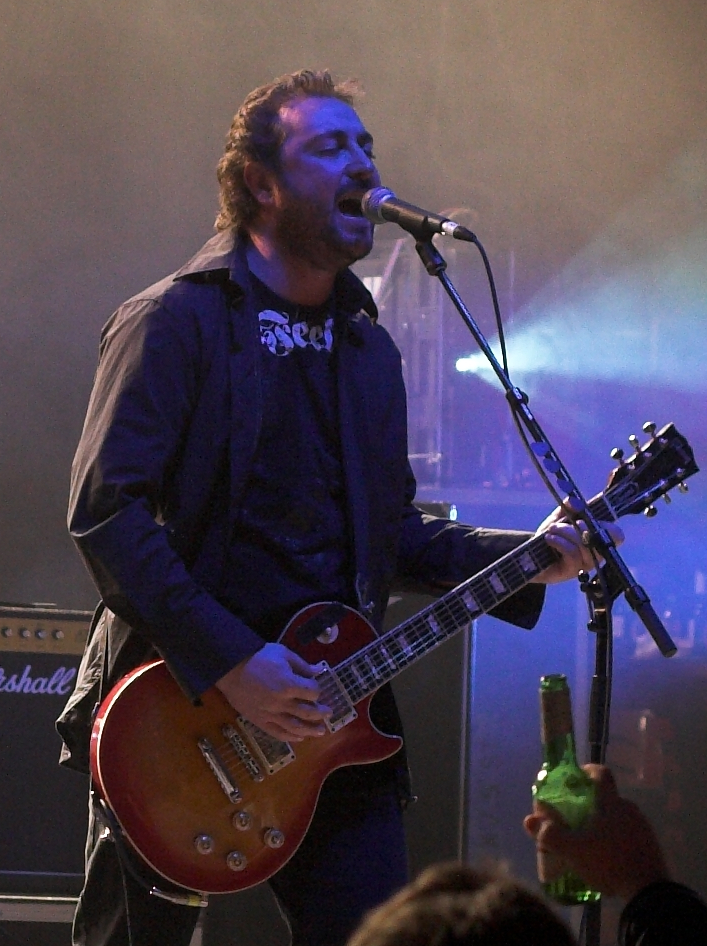
- Reid in 2006 performing at TechFest with The Feelers

Background information
- Born: 25 May 1974 (age 52); Christchurch, New Zealand
- Genres: Rock, pop, classical
- Occupations: Singer-songwriter, guitarist, video producer
- Instruments: Vocals, electric guitar, acoustic guitar, bass guitar
- Years active: 1992–present
- Member of: The Feelers
- Website: www.jamesreid.co.nz

James Charles Gallienne Reid (born 25 May 1974) is a New Zealand singer-songwriter, guitarist, and music and video producer, best known as the lead singer in the band The Feelers.

Reid is regarded as one of New Zealand's most successful songwriters and rock musicians, having formed The Feelers in 1992, which became one of the best selling New Zealand musical acts in the country. Reid has also collaborated as a writer with other New Zealand artists including Anika Moa, and was the founder of Broken Records, a former record label.

In November 2013, Reid released his first solo album, entitled Saint. Since then, he has released a number of singles and EPs, including "Back to the Beginning" (2018) and Too Close to the Sun (2020).

== Early and personal life ==
Reid was born in Christchurch, New Zealand, on 25 May 1974. He has two older sisters and two older brothers, including his brother Donald Reid who is also a musical artist. Reid developed an interest in music as early as four years old, learning to play his first song, a rendition of Rhinestone Cowboy. He considers his favourite genres to be "pop, rock, indie, and country".

Reid was sent to a religious boarding school as a child, attending church daily and joining the choir. As a teenager he attended Christ's College, then went on to study fine art and film at the University of Canterbury, but postponed his studies to pursue success with The Feelers.

Reid has stated he suffers from alcoholism and has multiple drink-driving-related convictions related to incidents in 2017 and 2024, prompting him to seek help. In 2024, he pleaded guilty to refusing to give a blood sample after allegedly failing to stop for police, who caught him driving over the speed limit on Boxing Day. He voluntarily admitted himself to the Nova Trust rehabilitation clinic for three months, and was subsequently sentenced to 12 months supervision and disqualified from driving for one year.

== Career ==
Reid describes his vocal range as tenor. He has listed several bands and musicians as influences in his music, including The Beatles, Cat Stevens, Muse, David Bowie, Pearl Jam, and Soundgarden. Reid's musical career has led to five number one albums on the NZ Music Charts, as well as eight music awards with The Feelers, including winning Songwriter of the Year in the 1999 New Zealand Music Awards. Reid has also collaborated with other New Zealand artists, including co-writing "Falling in Love Again" on Anika Moa's debut album Thinking Room (2001).

=== The Feelers (1992–present) ===
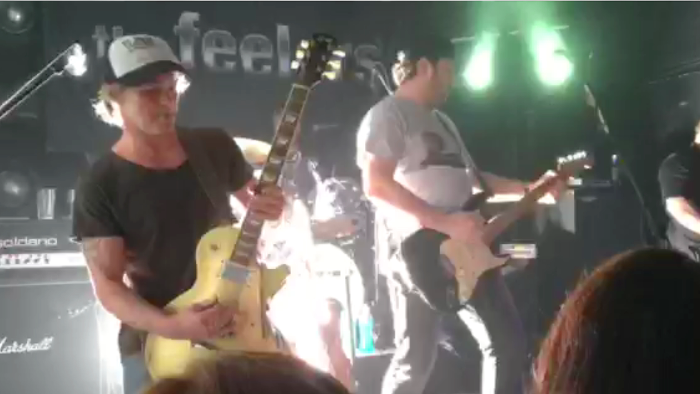
The Feelers in June 2015, Reid to the right.

Reid formed The Feelers in 1992 in Christchurch, with guitarist and drummer Hamish Gee and bassist Matt Thomas. In 1994, the band debuted with their EP The Leaving through Wildside Records. The band drew the attention of Tim Groenendaal, a former radio DJ, who became their manager. In 1997, The Feelers signed with Warner Music.

The Feelers had its first breakthrough hit with the single "Pressure Man", which received an NZ Music Award, and followed up with the singles "Space Cadet" and "Supersystem", the latter which won an APRA Silver Scroll for radio airplay. Their 1998 album Supersystem was a chart success, debuting at number 1. The band found continued success with the Communicate (2000) and Playground Battle (2003), and regularly toured during the summer.

=== Broken Records (2001–2018) ===
In 2001, Reid founded Broken Records, an Auckland-based label for Reid's projects which also worked with New Zealand rock bands, including The Valves. This is not to be confused with the Christian label of the same name, which closed in the early 1990s.

In May 2018, Broken Records went into liquidation after becoming insolvent, citing a downturn in business. The process was completed in June 2018, and the company was closed.

=== Solo career (2013–present) ===
In 2013, Reid released his first solo album, entitled Saint. The album was notably different from his work with The Feelers, featuring a more delicate acoustic sound. It was released on 22 November on iTunes.

From 2016 through to 2019, Reid released five singles, including "From Your Side", "Time is Another Lover", "Planet Nowhere" and "Meet Me at the Troubadour". In 2019, he commenced a fourteen-date tour across New Zealand named the Songbook tour. In 2020, he released Too Close to the Sun, a 6-track EP which included the aforementioned singles.

== Discography ==
=== Albums ===
- Saint (2013)

=== Singles and EPs ===
- "From Your Side" (2016)
- "Time Is Another Lover" (2016)
- "Meet Me at the Troubadour" (2018)
- "Back to the Beginning" (2018)
- "Planet Nowhere" (2019)
- Too Close to the Sun (2020)
