= Hope Nature Forgives =

Studio album by The Feelers
- Released: 1 August 2011
- Genre: Rock
- Label: Border

The Feelers chronology
One World (2006)	Hope Nature Forgives (2011)

Hope Nature Forgives is the fifth album released by New Zealand rock band The Feelers. It was released on 1 August 2011. Hope Nature Forgives debuted in the Official New Zealand Top 40 Albums on 8 August 2011. It has been in the Top 40 Albums for nine weeks with a highest position of #4.

== Track listing ==
No.	Title	Writer(s)	Length
1.	"Didn't Want To Fall In Love"	James Reid	3:52
2.	"Snakes (Can't Fix Me)"	Reid	3:47
3.	"Dasvidaniya"	Reid	4:49
4.	"Suicide Dancer"	Reid	5:00
5.	"Sweet The Tempest"	Reid	4:24
6.	"Blue Skies"	Reid	4:46
7.	"What's The Meaning Of This?"	Reid	4:38
8.	"Narrow Lanes"	Reid, Davita Joseph	5:08
9.	"Right Here, Right Now"	Mike Edwards	2:54
10.	"Open Up The Ground"	Reid	4:45
11.	"Something About Romance"	Reid	4:56
12.	"No Need To Worry"	Reid	4:17
13.	"Hope Nature Forgives"	Reid, Hamish Gee	7:33
