= Darren Watson =

Darren Watson may refer to:

- Darren Watson (musician), New Zealand singer, songwriter and guitarist
- Darren Watson (footballer) (born 2003), Scottish professional footballer
