= Stand Up (The Feelers song) =

Song by The Feelers

from the album Playground Battle
- Songwriter: James Reid

"Stand Up" is a song recorded by New Zealand band The Feelers for their third studio album, Playground Battle (2003). Written by band singer James Reid, the song reached number seventeen on the New Zealand Singles Chart and won the New Zealand Music Award for Radio Airplay Record of the Year. Stan Walker covered the song in 2010.

== Background ==
"Stand Up" was written by The Feelers singer James Reid.

== Reception ==
"Stand Up" peaked at number seventeen on the New Zealand Singles Chart, and spent a total of twenty-nine weeks on the chart. It won the New Zealand Music Award for Radio Airplay Record of the Year in 2006.

== Use in media ==
The New Zealand National Party used "Stand Up" in its campaign leading up to the New Zealand general election, 2011. Reid stipulated that the band's decision to allow the song to be used by the National Party did not indicate any kind of political endorsement.

== Stan Walker version ==
"Stand Up"

Single by Stan Walker
- Released: 19 April 2010
- Recorded: March 2010
- Length: 3:09
- Label: Sony
- Songwriter: James Reid

Stan Walker singles chronology
"Unbroken" (2010)	"Stand Up" (2010)	"Stuck in a Box" (2010)

Australian Idol season 7 winner Stan Walker recorded a cover of the song in March 2010. It was released as a digital download on 19 April 2010.

The cover was used as the official song for the All Whites' campaign for the 2010 FIFA World Cup, which it was especially recorded for. New Zealand Football CEO Michael Galding said "lyrically, the song captures everything this campaign is about". Walker said that "The All Whites have certainly earned my respect and support with reaching the pinnacle of their sport".

=== Music video ===
Walker holding up an All Whites banner in the music video

A music video was shot for the single, and was released on 20 April. It consists of various football supporters at All Whites games, and Walker at a recording studio.

=== Critical reception ===
The song received criticism from the public, including radio DJ Jason Reeves, who called the song "weak". All White Ben Sigmund, who "prefers rock music before matches", said "it's not the kind of song he'd listen to before a game". The New Zealand Herald's Michael Brown called the cover "a decent song. But it's a cover."
