= Running Through the Fire (Storm) =

Single by Anika Moa

from the album Love in Motion
- Released: 5 April 2010
- Genre: Pop, electropop
- Length: 3:49
- Label: EMI
- Songwriter: Anika Moa
- Producers: Anika Moa, Andre Upston

Anika Moa singles chronology
"Beside You" (2008)	"Running Through the Fire (Storm)" (2010)	"Blame It on the Rain" (2010)

"Running Through the Fire (Storm)" is a single by Anika Moa, a singer-songwriter from New Zealand. It is the lead single from her fourth studio album, Love in Motion.

== Background, composition and release ==
Running Through the Fire (Storm)

Originally under the title of "Storm", Moa wrote "Running Through the Fire" for her father on the day he died. She later said, "I don't like that [inspiration], so I changed it...it's a love song."

"Running Through the Fire" is an electropop-rock song, and contains 1980s pop influences. and makes use of the electric guitar.

The song was released in March 2010.

== Reception ==
In album reviews, Jo Tindling of Amplifier and Scott Kara of The New Zealand Herald compared "Running Through the Fire (Storm)" to the work of Ladyhawke.

The song was a finalist for the 2010 APRA Silver Scroll, a peer-judged songwriting award, but lost to The Naked and Famous' "Young Blood". It is Moa's third song to be nominated for the award, with "Stolen Hill" and "Dreams in My Head" being the previous two.

On the chart dated 12 April 2010, the song appeared on the New Zealand Singles Chart at number thirty-eight. It slipped out of the chart the following week.

== Music video and live performances ==
The music video for the single, funded by New Zealand On Air, was directed by Tim van Dammen. A one shot, it features Moa playing an electric guitar and singing with her backing band, then walking around a garden in the night. Rays of light stream from Moa as she walks.

== Live performances ==
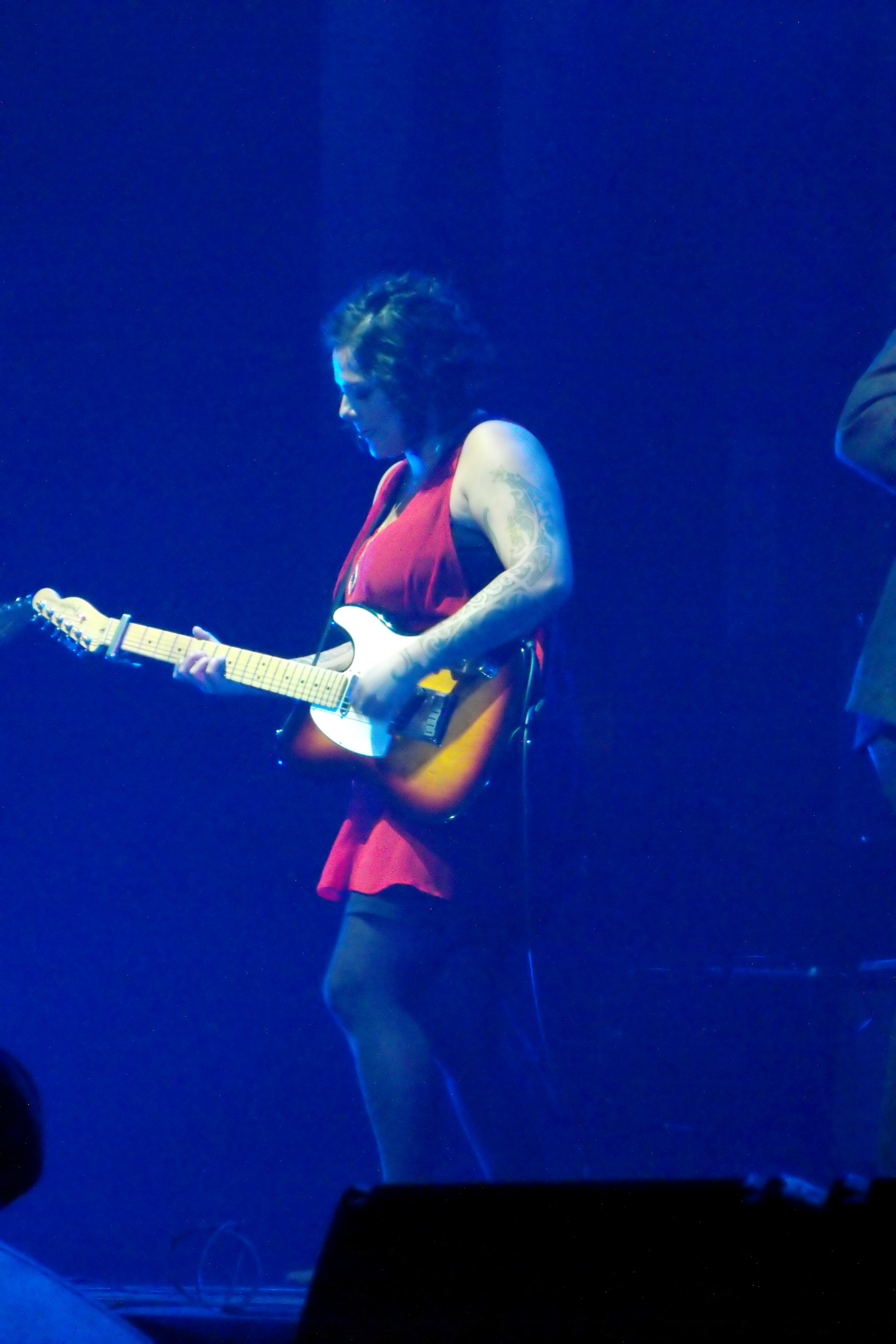
Moa performing the song at the 2010 New Zealand Music Awards

Moa performed "Running Through the Fire" on Close Up on 5 April 2010, the day that the album, Love in Motion, was released in New Zealand. The following day she played the song on Breakfast, live from Mission Bay. At the 2010 New Zealand Music Awards, held on 7 October 2010, Moa sang the song, accompanied by Julia Deans.

Moa also performed the song on her Love in Motion tour in May and June 2010, and The Datsuns covered the tune at the awards ceremony of the APRA Silver Scroll, for which the song was a finalist, on 8 September 2010. Band Together, a benefit concert was held in North Hagley Park in response to the 2010 Canterbury earthquake on 23 October 2010, which Moa appeared at. Her performance of "Running Through the Fire" was recorded and included on the album Band Together: Concert For Canterbury.
