= Justin Pemberton =

New Zealand filmmaker

Justin Pemberton is a documentary filmmaker based in New Zealand.

== Life and career ==
Pemberton's adaptation of economist Thomas Piketty’s NY Times bestseller Capital in the Twenty-First Century premièred at the 2019 Sydney Film Festival and expanded to a worldwide release in 2020. The film has a 93% "Certified Fresh" score on Rotten Tomatoes.

In 2024 Pemberton directed, with Natalie Malcon, Escaping Utopia, a three-part documentary series about the Gloriavale Christian Community and the efforts of former members to help others leave it. Produced by Warner Bros. International Television Production New Zealand, the series premiered on TVNZ 1 and TVNZ+ in March 2024 and was later sold internationally to broadcasters including the BBC, ABC, SVT, NRK and DR. It won Best Factual Series at the 2024 New Zealand Television Awards, along with Best Editing: Documentary/Factual and Best Original Score.

In 2016 Pemberton co-wrote and directed a film about rugby player Richie McCaw called Chasing Great, which topped the New Zealand box office with a record-breaking opening weekend and went on to become the highest grossing New Zealand documentary of all time.

His 2016 interactive documentary I Spy (with My 5 Eyes) investigated the Five Eyes Intelligence sharing network. The documentary was narrated by Lucy Lawless and produced by Carthew Neal. I Spy (with My 5 Eyes) was nominated for a 2018 Canadian Screen Award for Best Original Interactive Production.

Pemberton was Executive Producer on the 2016 David Farrier documentary Tickled.

In 2012 Pemberton wrote and directed the feature docudrama The Golden Hour, based on the story of New Zealand athletes Peter Snell and Murray Halberg at the 1960 Summer Olympics in Rome. The Golden Hour was nominated for a 2013 International Emmy Award for best documentary.

His film The Nuclear Comeback investigated the nuclear power industry’s claim that, as a low carbon emitter, nuclear power is climate-friendly source of energy. The documentary won Best Documentary at Italy’s CinemAmbiente Film Festival in 2008 and Best New Zealand Feature Documentary at the DocNZ Film Festival. Pemberton was also awarded Achievement in Directing (Documentary) at the 2008 Qantas Film and Television Awards for The Nuclear Comeback.

Pemberton’s film Love, Speed and Loss, about Grand Prix road-racer Kim Newcombe, won Best Documentary, Best Editing and Best Directing at the 2007 New Zealand Screen Awards and was awarded Best Arts/Festival Documentary at the 2007 Qantas Television Awards.

He has collaborated with New Zealand musician Anika Moa, directing two documentaries following the singer as well as music videos and photo shoots, including the cover of her 2010 album Love In Motion. Moa has also composed the soundtracks for five of Pemberton’s films.

He is also the co-founder of Anqa Compliance, a financial crime detection platform.

== Festivals and awards ==
Love Speed and Loss

- 2007 NZ Screen Awards: Win, Best Documentary,
- 2007 NZ Screen Awards: Win, Achievement in Directing
- 2007 NZ TV Awards: Win, Best Arts/Festival Documentary
- 2005 New Zealand International Film Festivals
- 2006 Reel Life On Film, Melbourne, Australia

The Nuclear Comeback

- 2008 NZ Film & TV Awards: Win, Achievement in Directing
- 2008 Cinemambiente, Italy: Win, Best Documentary
- 2007 Documentary Edge Awards: Win, Best NZ Feature
- 2008 Göteborg International Film Festival, Sweden
- 2008 Rodos Film Festival, Greece: Runner-up, Medium Length Feature
- 2008 South African International Documentary Film Festival
- 2008 Festival Internacional de Cine Documentary, Mexico
- 2008 Globale Berlin Film Festival, Germany
- 2009 Cinema Planeta, Mexico
- 2009 One World Film Festival, Prague, Czech Republic

The Golden Hour

- 2013 International Emmy Awards: Nomination, Best Documentary

Chasing Great

- 2017 New Zealand Film Awards: Nomination, Best Documentary, Best Documentary Director

I Spy (With My 5 Eyes)

- 2018 Canadian Screen Awards: Nomination, Best Original Interactive Production
- 2018 Cleveland International Film Festival, USA
- 2017 Festival International de Programmes Audiovisuels, France

Capital In The Twenty-First Century

- 2019 Sydney Film Festival
- 2019 New Zealand International Film Festival
- 2019 Melbourne International Film Festival
- 2019 Jerusalem Film Festival
- 2019 Filmfest Hamburg
- 2019 Doc NYC
- 2020 CPH:DOX
- 2020 Edinburgh International Film Festival
- 2020 Docs Against Gravity Film Festival, Poland
- 2020 DOCVILLE International Documentary Film Festival, Belgium
- 2020 Festival Varilux de Cinema Francês, Brazil
- 2020 Ji.hlava International Documentary Film Festival, Czech Republic
- 2021 Mostra Ecofalante de Cinema, Brazil

Escaping Utopia

- 2024 NZ TV Awards: Win, Best Factual Series
- 2024 NZ TV Awards: Nomination, Best Director: Documentary/Factual
