= Youthful =

2001 song by Anika Moa

- Australian CD single artwork

Single by Anika Moa

from the album Thinking Room
- B-side: "Where Do We Go"; "See the Sun" (demo)
- Released: 4 February 2002 (Note: Although the song received airplay and charted in New Zealand in 2001, it was never released as a single there.)
- Genre: Pop
- Length: 4:18
- Label: Atlantic; WEA
- Songwriter(s): Anika Moa
- Producer(s): Victor Van Vugt

Anika Moa singles chronology
"Youthful" (2002)	"Good in My Head" (2002)

Music video
- "Youthful" on YouTube

"Youthful" is a song by New Zealand singer and television presenter Anika Moa, released as her debut single and as the lead single from her first studio album, Thinking Room (2001). Moa wrote the song before she joined Atlantic Records and recorded Thinking Room, which was produced by Victor Van Vugt. Although the song was released commercially in Australia and was serviced to US radio in early 2002, it was never issued as a single in New Zealand. Despite this, it received plentiful airplay in the country, allowing it to reach number five on the RIANZ Singles Chart in October 2001. At the 2002 New Zealand Music Awards, "Youthful" won Moa the award for Best Songwriter.

== Background and release ==
Anika Moa was an unsigned recording artist when American record executives became interested in "Youthful". When Moa signed with Atlantic Records, she became the first New Zealand recording artist to join an international label without first releasing an album in her home country. Although "Youthful" was never issued as a commercial single in New Zealand, a CD single was released in Australia on 4 February 2002, containing the B-sides "Where Do We Go" and a demo of "See the Sun", neither of which appear on Thinking Room. On 18 January 2002, the song was serviced to hot adult contemporary, smooth jazz, and triple A radio stations in the United States.

== Composition ==
"Youthful" is a pop song with lyrics about objectification and exploitation. Written with only three chords, the song has an instrumentation consisting of guitars, drums, and synthesisers that play vocables. The track possesses tonal ambiguity, with the simplest overall key being C-sharp minor. The song's verses use two of the three chords. During the pre-chorus and chorus, the submediant chord, synthesisers, and vocal harmonies arrive while a bass guitar and tambourine play quavers and semiquavers, respectively. The song's bridge tones down the chorus instrumentation, making it resemble the verse structure, and the outro contains an instrumental fade-out, ending the song a cappella. The song was produced by Victor Van Vugt.

== Commercial performance ==
Even without an official release in New Zealand, "Youthful" eventually saturated the country's airwaves and topped RadioScope's airplay ranking in late 2001, finding an audience on pop, adult contemporary, and easy listening radio. It was the only song by a New Zealand artist to top RadioScope's airplay chart in 2001 and was the eight-most-played track of the year on New Zealand radio overall. Charting on airplay alone, the song debuted at number 37 on New Zealand's RIANZ Singles Chart in July 2001, rising up the listing over the next three months and peaking at number five on 28 October. It charted within the top 50 for 24 weeks, ending the year as New Zealand's 18th-most-successful single and helping bolster the sales of Thinking Room. Despite the song's success, Moa would soon leave Atlantic Records and return to New Zealand to maintain her independence as a songwriter, citing the label's intention to turn her into a mainstream pop singer.

== Music video ==
A music video was made to promote "Youthful", directed by Paul Casserley. In the video, Moa wanders through the hallways of a house while wearing a denim jacket. Each time she walks into a new room, the seasons in the house change, and her outfit alters to match the particular season. One room features snow and Moa wearing wintery clothes, and another features an autumn tree with falling leaves. A third room shows Moa standing in front of several mason jars hidden behind flapping sheets of paper. In an interview with New Zealand television channel C4 in 2005, Moa stated that she picked the video's theme from several options she was presented with but felt that it did not look as good as she wanted it to, stating that other people told her she looked like Beth Heke on camera.

== Awards and accolades ==
"Youthful" was nominated for two awards at the 2002 New Zealand Music Awards, losing its nomination for Single of the Year to "Fade Away" by Che Fu but winning Moa the award for Best Songwriter. "Youthful" also won the Silver Scroll Award for Most Performed Work in New Zealand at the APRA Music Awards of 2002.

== Charts ==
=== Weekly charts ===
Chart (2001)	Peak position
New Zealand (Recorded Music NZ)	5

=== Year-end charts ===
Chart (2001)	Position
New Zealand (RIANZ)	18

== Release history ==
Region	Date	Format(s)	Label(s)	Ref.
United States	18 January 2002	Hot adult contemporary; smooth jazz; triple A radio	Atlantic	
Australia	4 February 2002	CD	Atlantic; WEA	
