= Love in Motion (Anika Moa album) =

Studio album by Anika Moa
- Released: 12 March 2010
- Recorded: Roundhead Studios, Boatshed Studio, Radio New Zealand; 2009
- Genres: Pop, pop rock
- Length: 41:07
- Label: Flightless Birds/EMI
- Producers: Anika Moa, Andre Upston

Anika Moa chronology
In Swings the Tide (2007)	Love in Motion (2010)	Anika, Boh & Hollie - Peace of Mind (2013)

Singles from Love in Motion
- 1. "Running Through the Fire (Storm)" Released: 5 April 2010; 2. "Blame It on the Rain" Released: 27 August 2010

Love in Motion is the fourth studio album by New Zealand singer-songwriter Anika Moa. The album's underlying theme is love. Moa's civil partner, Azaria Universe, was her biggest influence when writing the album. With Love in Motion, Moa moved from the folk and country pop influences of In Swings the Tide to a pop rock sound. The album was released by EMI Records internationally on 12 March 2010, with releases in Moa's home country and Australia following on 5 April and 10 September, respectively. Moa toured Westfield malls the week of the album's release, and a concert tour followed in May and June 2010.

Critical reviews for the album have been mostly positive, with Moa's lyrical writing received well. It debuted and peaked on the New Zealand Albums Chart at number four. "Running Through the Fire (Storm)" served as the album's lead single, which peaked at number thirty-eight on the New Zealand Singles Chart. "Blame It on the Rain", the second single, did not appear on any record chart. Love in Motion Covers was released in October 2011; it comprises covers of the songs from Love in Motion by other musicians.

== Background and recording ==
Moa has said that her partner, burlesque dancer Azaria Universe, with whom she entered into a civil union in February 2010, was a major inspiration for the album. Love in Motion is dedicated to Universe, with the CD liner bearing the message, "For Azaria, let it be you, I fall into".

When writing the album, Moa wanted to put the word "love" into the title of every song. Ultimately, four of the ten track titles contain "love" or "loves", and every song has the word in its lyrics. In interviews, Moa has revealed the inspiration and circumstances around many of its songs. She said that "I Am the Woman Who Loves You" is about when she and Universe first met and that "Love Me Again" is about "taking the piss out of [her] love for Azaria", calling the latter "a real Anika Moa song." According to Moa, "Two Hearts" and "Secrets and Lies" were inspired by people who "fucked [her] off". "Secrets and Lies" was written while Moa says she was "in a really bad mood", however she asserts that it is her favourite track on the album. Moa said that "Blame It on the Rain" is about a person who Moa "will never ever name because they will be really, really sad if they knew". "In the Air" is about Moa's fear of flying, and "Running Through the Fire (Storm)", originally simply called "Storm", was prompted by the death of Moa's father.

After interviewing Moa, The New Zealand Herald's Scott Kara said that Love in Motion "is about love on all levels". Moa described love as having "so many aspects to it." She also said that "all of the songs are about love that's true." In an interview with Wendyl Nissen from Newstalk ZB, Moa explained, "Most of the songs that I write are based on memories of my life or memories of someone who I know's life". She also mentioned that the album was influenced by many types of love; not only her own, but also the love of her family, and love illustrated on soap operas such as Shortland Street and Grey's Anatomy.

Moa wrote the songs for Love in Motion in two weeks, and it was recorded in two more weeks. Most of the album was written in Melbourne, while recording took place at three locations: Roundhead Studios, Boatshed Studio and Radio New Zealand. Moa and Andre Upston produced the album.

The writing and recording of Love in Motion was documented in the film In Bed With Anika Moa by filmmaker Justin Pemberton for the TVNZ documentary series Artsville.

== Composition ==
"Running Through the Fire (Storm)"
The lead single, uses the electric guitar to create a "gritty" pop rock-electropop atmosphere.

"I Am the Woman Who Loves You"
Inspired by when Moa first met her partner, the song was acclaimed by critics for its low-level acoustic production.

Moa stated that "this is the first album that I really thought about what I wanted ... I wanted to keep [the songs] simple in structure, concentrating on the layering of vocals and guitars." With Love in Motion, Moa moved away from her traditional pop and country pop sound to a pop rock environment. She intentionally changed the sound, through alterations in production and engineering, rather than the writing style. Moa told co-producer Andre Upston that she wanted the album to sound "dirty and gritty." The album combines the genres of pop rock, "80s pop", bubblegum pop, and rock'n'roll, as well as including both acoustic and electropop, and contains layered harmonies. Comparisons to the work of Ladyhawke, Sharon O'Neill, Pat Benatar and Bic Runga have been made. The sound of "I Am the Woman Who Loves You", noted as a standout track by critics, was called "big but not overblown...stylish and swooning".

Lyrically, Love in Motion explores a wide variety of the main theme of love. The title track centres around "pure, unguarded joy", and sexual innuendo exists during "Love Me Again", while "Two Hearts" contains harsh lines and "Secrets and Lies" includes "don't-mess-with-me outpourings". Various songs also examine conflict, and others, the loss of love.

== Release and promotion ==
Love in Motion was released digitally by the Flightless Birds label internationally on 12 March 2010. A New Zealand release followed on 5 April, by EMI Records, as both digital download and CD formats. During the week of the album's release (6 – 10 April), Moa toured several Westfield shopping malls in Auckland, Hamilton, Wellington and Christchurch, playing for free to the public. In Australia, EMI released the album on 10 September 2010. A special edition was released on 18 October 2010, featuring a second disc of acoustic versions of each track on the album. Moa said that "I've chosen to record an acoustic version of the album because I believe in the vulnerable, simplistic side of music and writing. The way you connect the songs the first time you hear it, no drums, no effects, no funky bass lines, just your voice and a guitar... it feels like magic."

=== Singles ===
The lead single from Love in Motion, "Running Through the Fire (Storm)", was released in New Zealand on 5 April 2010, the same day as the album. "Running Through the Fire (Storm)" briefly charted on the New Zealand Singles Chart in its week of release, at number thirty-eight. Despite this, the song fell off the chart the next week. "Blame It on the Rain" was released as the Australian single via digital download on 27 August, but it did not appear on any singles chart.

=== Tour ===
Love in Motion tour
- Concert by Anika Moa
- A promotional poster for the tour
- Location: New Zealand
- Associated album: Love in Motion
- Start date: 27 May 2010
- End date: 5 June 2010
- No. of shows: 6

A concert tour was held in various New Zealand cities in late May and early June 2010. Chip Matthews, Geoff Maddock and Nick Gaffaney, who all played on the album, joined Moa on the tour.

Date	City	Venue
27 May	Queenstown	Revolver
28 May	Timaru	No 8 Wired Bar
29 May	Christchurch	Al's Bar
3 June	Wellington	San Fran Bathhouse
4 June	Auckland	Galatos
5 June	Hamilton	The Meteor

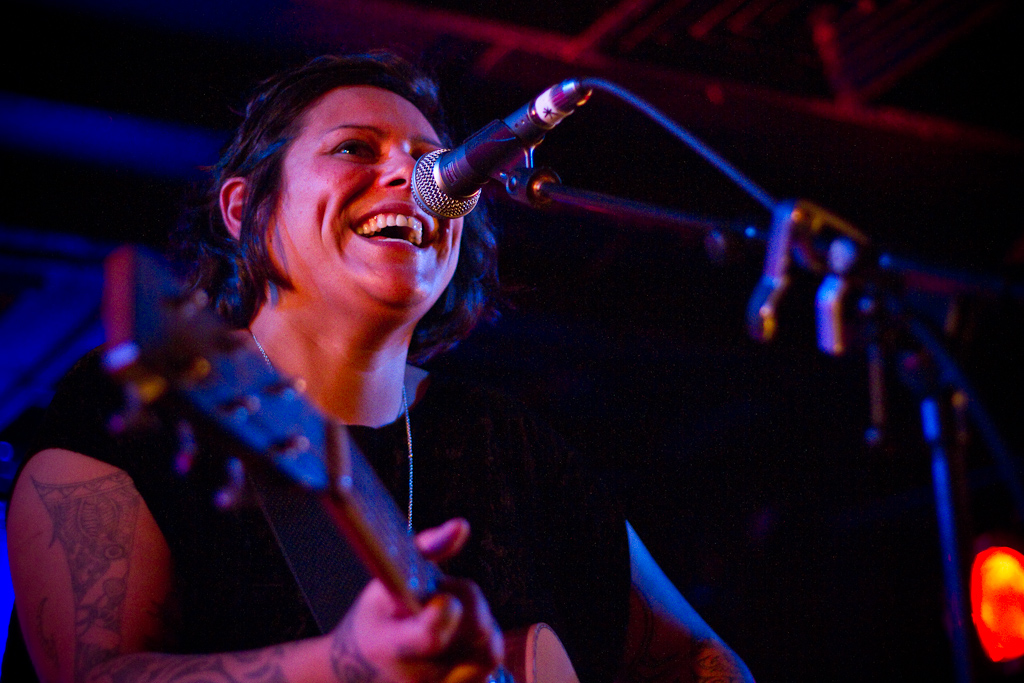
Moa on the Love in Motion tour in Wellington

Karyn Cushen of Undertheradar said "Moa wears her new musical influence well...featuring less pop, less blues and less country influences," and called the tour shows "a refreshing change." The Timaru Herald's Katarina Filipe praised Moa's live performing nature, noting that "the radio and CD versions were nothing compared to her on-stage performance". Vicki Anderson of The Press lauded the accompaniment by Matthews, Maddock and Gaffaney for giving songs "new energy", while the Waikato Times' Kate Monahan called the show "a high-energy, emotionally powerful performance".

== Reception ==
=== Critical reception ===
Love in Motion
Review scores
Source	Rating
Amplifier	(favourable)
The Dominion Post	5/5 stars
Elsewhere	(mixed)
The Nelson Mail	4/5 stars
The New Zealand Herald	4/5 stars
North & South	(favourable)
Otago Daily Times	3/5 stars
The Press	(favourable)
Waikato Times	3/5 stars

Reviews for Love in Motion were mostly positive. Tom Cardy of The Dominion Post called the album "near faultless" and gave it a rating of five-out-of-five stars, commenting that "Moa's risky decision ... to follow her own path ... was the right one." The Nelson Mail's Nick Ward praised the "slightly tough" album, putting it "up there with her best work." Scott Kara of The New Zealand Herald called the album "diverse and interesting," and gave it four out of five stars. Amplifier magazine's Jo Tindling compared the work with that of Ladyhawke, and called it "different from her other work but ... her voice is still as tender and sweet as it ever was". Simon Sweetman from North & South described the album as "an almost understated collection of love songs – possibly Moa's strongest effort." The Bay of Plenty Times' Kristin MacFarlane said that "Anika Moa fans...certainly won't be disappointed". Vicki Anderson of The Press complimented Moa's lyrics, writing, "Whoever coined the phrase 'heart on sleeve' must have had Moa in mind." She concluded, "Love in Motion only serves to confirm my belief that Anika Moa is one of New Zealand's best songwriters."

However, Graham Reid from Elsewhere wrote that "it is...a lot of very personal love being revealed and explored here and some will doubtless find that introspective nature and narrow wavelength less appealing than what has preceded it." The Otago Daily Times' Shane Gilchrest gave Love in Motion three stars, saying that Moa "ends up playing it a bit too safe." James Thompson from the Waikato Times commended "the power of the lyrics", but said that "regrettably, Love in Motion will not be ... a hugely successful album."

Love in Motion won the Best Female Solo Artist award at the 2010 New Zealand Music Awards, beating Holy Smoke by Gin Wigmore and Humour and the Misfortune of Others by Hollie Smith. It was also nominated for the awards of Album of the Year and Best Pop Album, which were both won by Wigmore's album.

=== Commercial reception ===
Love in Motion peaked at its début position of number four on the RIANZ New Zealand Albums Chart. The album remained on the chart for eleven non-consecutive weeks. This makes it Moa's second-highest peaking album, behind Thinking Room (2001), which peaked at number-one on the Albums Chart. It is also her third-longest charting album, behind Thinking Room and In Swings the Tide (2007), which spent forty-five and thirty-nine weeks on the chart, respectively.

== Track listing ==
All tracks written by Anika Moa.

1. "Two Hearts" – 4:03
2. "Running Through the Fire (Storm)" – 3:49
3. "I Am the Woman Who Loves You" – 4:57
4. "Blame It on the Rain" – 5:02
5. "Secrets and Lies" – 3:49
6. "Love Me Again" – 4:20
7. "Flying on the Wings" – 4:22
8. "Love in Motion" – 3:50
9. "In the Air" – 3:31
10. "Burn This Love" – 3:19

New Zealand and Australian iTunes Stores download only

11. "Running Through the Fire (Storm)" [Acoustic Version] – 4:15

== Personnel ==
- Isaac Aesili – horns
- Don Bartley – mastering
- Barny Bewick – artwork
- Tom Dalton – management
- Nick Gaffaney – drums and percussion
- Godfrey de Grut – keys
- Bruce Lynch – lapsteel
- Anika Moa – vocals, harmonies, guitar, production, artwork
- Mushroom Music – publishing
- Geoff Maddock – guitar
- Chip Matthews – bass
- Justin Pemberton – photography
- Andre Upston – production, engineering, mixing

Source: CD liner

== Release history ==
Country	Date	Label
Austria	12 March 2010	Flightless Birds
Canada	12 March 2010	Flightless Birds
France	12 March 2010	Flightless Birds
Germany	12 March 2010	Flightless Birds
Italy	12 March 2010	Flightless Birds
Japan	12 March 2010	Flightless Birds
Mexico	12 March 2010	Flightless Birds
Netherlands	12 March 2010	Flightless Birds
Spain	12 March 2010	Flightless Birds
Sweden	12 March 2010	Flightless Birds
Switzerland	12 March 2010	Flightless Birds
United States	12 March 2010	Flightless Birds
New Zealand	5 April 2010	Flightless Birds/EMI
Australia	10 September 2010	Flightless Birds/EMI

== Love in Motion Covers ==
On 31 October 2011, Moa released Love in Motion Covers, with each of the original album's ten tracks covered by a different New Zealand artist. "Give My Heart to You", written by Moa and Geoff Maddock, was also included; while this song was not included on the original version of Love in Motion, Moa released her recording of it as a single on 11 April 2011. Nick Ward from The Nelson Mail rated the covers album four stars out of five. Moa had the idea after hearing her friend Tim Guy cover one of her songs. Guy's cover of "Burn This Love" appears on the album.

=== Track listing ===
No.	Title	Covered by	Length
1.	"Two Hearts"	Cairo Knife Fight	4:58
2.	"Running Through The Fire (Storm)"	Dictaphone Blues	4:10
3.	"I Am The Woman Who Loves You"	Mel Parsons	3:14
4.	"Blame It on the Rain"	Gramsci	4:52
5.	"Secrets And Lies"	Street Chant	3:35
6.	"Love Me Again"	Maisey Rika	4:43
7.	"Flying on the Wings"	Lindon Puffin and The Fontanelles	4:34
8.	"Love in Motion"	Ed Cake and The Jesus Band	3:21
9.	"In The Air"	Julia Deans	3:30
10.	"Burn This Love"	Tim Guy	3:38
11.	"Give My Heart To You"	Luke Thompson	4:36
