= Supersystem (album) =

Studio album by The Feelers
- Released: 1998
- Recorded: York Street Studios, Auckland
- Genre: Rock
- Length: 52:00
- Label: Warner
- Producer: Malcolm Welsford

The Feelers chronology
Supersystem (1998)	Communicate (2001)

Professional ratings
Review scores
Source	Rating
AllMusic	3.5/5 stars

Supersystem, released in 1998, is the debut album by the Feelers. Since its release it has sold over four times platinum in the NZ Music Charts and is the winner of five NZ music awards in 1998. Singles include "Pressure Man", "Venus", "Friend" and "Supersystem".

== Track listing ==
No.	Title	Writer(s)	Length
1.	"Pressure Man"	James Reid, Matthew Thomas, Hamish Gee	4:29
2.	"Satellite"	Reid, Thomas	2:46
3.	"Venus"	Reid	4:50
4.	"Space Cadet"	Reid, Thomas	3:13
5.	"Arm"	Reid, Gee	3:27
6.	"Honey God"	Reid, Gee	3:27
7.	"Friend"	Reid, Tim Skedden	2:56
8.	"From Space With Love"	Reid, Thomas	3:35
9.	"Float"	Reid	4:46
10.	"Pull the Strings"	Reid	5:29
11.	"Supersystem"	Reid	5:16
12.	"The Leaving"	Reid, Thomas, Gee	3:55
13.	"Mary"	Reid	2:58

== Chart performance and certifications ==
In September 1998, Supersystem peaked at #1 in New Zealand. While the album was on the New Zealand albums chart, Supersystem was certified four times platinum in June 1999.
