= Blues in New Zealand =

The history of blues in New Zealand dates from the 1960s. The earliest blues influences on New Zealand musicians were indirect – not from the United States but from white British blues musicians: first the R&B styles of Fleetwood Mac, Eric Clapton, The Animals and The Rolling Stones, and later the blues-tinged rock of groups such as Led Zeppelin. The first American blues artist to make a big impact in New Zealand was Stevie Ray Vaughan in the early 1980s. Other blues-related genres such as soul and gospel almost completely by-passed New Zealand audiences, except for a handful of hits from cross-over artists such as Ray Charles.

== Artists ==
=== Midge Marsden ===
Midge Marsden is a blues and R&B guitarist, harmonica-player and singer with a career spanning four decades.

=== Darren Watson ===
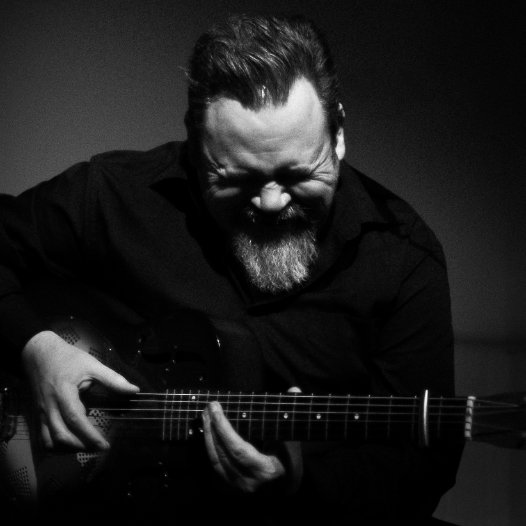
Darren Watson performing live at Port Chalmers Town Hall, 2020

Darren Watson is a singer, guitarist and music educator in a wide range of blues styles, as well as an international award-winning songwriter. Watson led the blues band Smoke Shop, which featured on the New Zealand charts and toured extensively throughout the country in the 1980s and 1990s, opening for several international blues artists including NZ tours with Koko Taylor, The Fabulous Thunderbirds, and two tours with The Robert Cray Band. In 2008 Watson won the blues section of Nashville's International Songwriting Competition. He was nominated for Most Promising Male Vocalist at the 1989 NZ Music Awards.

Watson has recorded six successful albums: King Size, which was nominated for Best Roots Album at the 2003 NZ Music Awards, 2005's South Pacific Soul, 2010's Saint Hilda's Faithless Boy, 2014's Introducing Darren Watson. 2018's Too Many Millionaires was favorably reviewed in several international magazines including jazz 'bible' Downbeat and UK magazine Blues Matters. The album also charted at No. 20 on the Official Top 40 Album Chart, No. 3 on the Official NZ Top 20 Album Chart, and No. 1 on the IMNZ Album Chart.

In 2020 Watson released Getting Sober For The End Of The World, which was critically praised and reached number 23 on the Official Top 40 Album Chart. The album was also nominated Best Folk Artist at the 2021 Aotearoa Music Awards. Since 2008 Watson has been teaching guitar, vocals, recording and composition from his home studio in Ngaio, Wellington. He also has a large online presence with over 12,000 subscribers to his YouTube channel featuring his music videos, chats, and guitar lessons.

=== Hammond Gamble ===
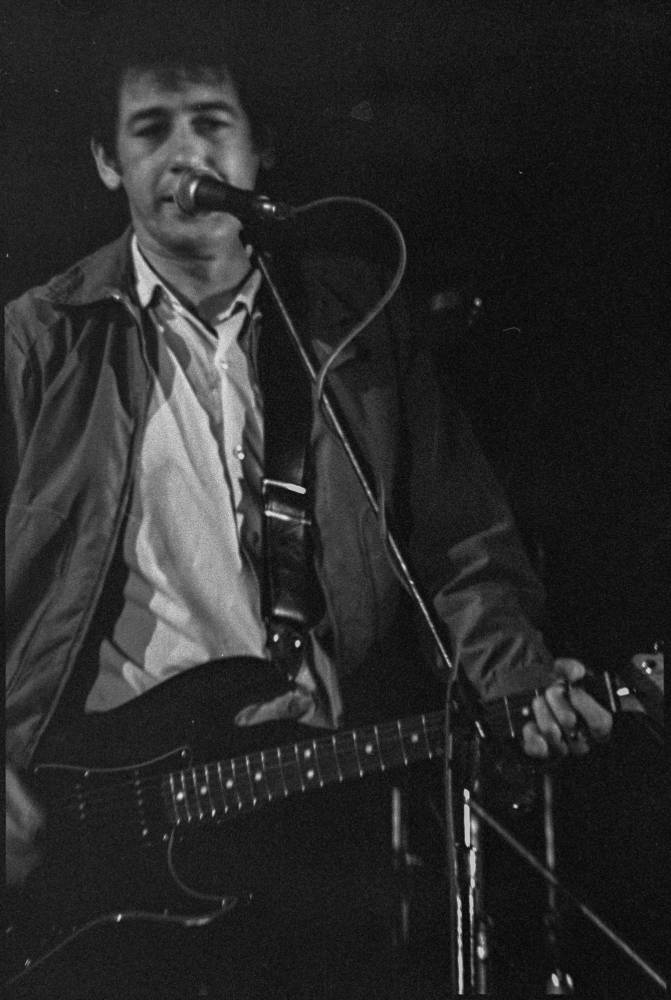
Gamble performing with Street Talk at the Auckland Town Hall, 1979

Hammond Gamble is a singer and guitarist born on 25 September 1951 in Bolton-le-Sands, Lancashire, Great Britain, who at the age of 12, moved to New Zealand, the homeland of his father. Gamble settled in Whangarei and at a local youth club began singing country music and Beatles' songs. He worked as a shipping clerk and although his work schedule did not allow for a fulltime music career, he "purchased a Fender Telecaster and Twin Reverb amp" and began playing with local musicians, gradually incorporating more blues material into his routine. In 1974 he formed the band Street Talk and within a year the group was fully professional and highly rated within the New Zealand music scene, playing regularly at the Gluepot Tavern in Auckland. At the time Gamble was noted for his "powerful stage presence" said to have gained the attention of Chris Hillman who saw Street Talk live and late produced their first single, Leaving the Country. After signing to WEA Records, Street Talk recorded a self-titled debut, which was produced by Kim Fowley, and 'Battleground of Fun'. Street Talk disbanded in 1980 and Gamble started the Hammond Gamble Band which released several albums. In 1995 he recorded a live album, Plugged in and Blue, said to have been a "good sendoff" for the Gluepot that was to close soon after that. Gamble is also a songwriter. Joe Cocker recorded his song "If You’ve Got Love, Give Me Some", and Gamble composed rock songs such as "Leaving the Country" (1978), "Should I be Good or Should I be Evil" (1981) and "Midnight" (1983). In 1992 he had a number-one hit with "You Make the Whole World Smile". Gamble has won a number of New Zealand awards, including 1981 Aotearoa Music Award for Top Male Vocalist, Film Soundtrack of the Year, and received the APRA Silver Scroll Award in 1984.

=== The Windy City Strugglers ===
The Windy City Strugglers is a Wellington band whose music is based on the singing, songwriting and guitar playing of Bill Lake and the vocals of Rick Bryant. Long-serving band members are Andrew Delahunty on guitar, harmonica and mandolin and Nick Bollinger on double bass.

=== Dave Murphy ===
Dave Murphy is one of New Zealand's leading exponents of finger picking blues guitar. He plays and teaches in the style of John Hurt, Robert Johnson, Gary Davis, Big Bill Broonzy, Mance Lipscomb, Stefan Grossman, Reverend Gary Davis, and Furry Lewis.

Murphy lives in downtown Wellington and performs regularly as a solo performer and in a duo with Dougal Spier, and as a member of the Red Dog Saloon Band. He also enjoys jamming with blues artists such as Carol Bean and Marg Layton at Capital Blues Club in Wellington.

In 2008 the CD "Yes That's Me – Dave Murphy Plays The Blues" was recorded by engineer Robbie Duncan of Braeburn Recording Studio and film-maker Costa Botes filmed the recording and produced the DVD.

=== Marg Layton ===
Born on a farm in New Zealand's rural south, Marg began her musical career in the folk café scene that was in full bloom in the late 60s, first in Christchurch, then in other parts of the country. She was a frequent performer at the Capital's legendary folk haunt, the Monde Marie.

The 70s saw her perform at major folk music clubs, festivals and concerts all over New Zealand, working alongside such pivotal folk figures as Don McLean, Tom Paxton and Odetta, who invited her to join her on stage at the Auckland Town Hall. A trip to Europe and the United States in 1980 – which included a pilgrimage to the birthplace of the blues, New Orleans, and meeting blues legend Alberta Hunter in Greenwich Village – consolidated her commitment to the blues.

Since returning to New Zealand in the early 80s she has sung the blues – with side-servings of jazz and folk – throughout the country; at arts, wine or food festivals, in theatres and bars, from community halls to opera houses. Her musical eclecticism has seen her working in a variety of settings. She has swung with top-flight jazz players like pianist Terry Crayford, bass player Paul Dyne and drummer Roger Sellers, and sung with such well-known blues vendors as Darren Watson, Dave Murphy, the Windy City Strugglers and Kokomo.

In 1999 she at last released her first album, Trouble and Satisfaction. Produced by broadcaster and musician Nick Bollinger and recorded at Marmalade and Plan 9 Studios in Wellington. In recent years her regular accompanists have included Windy City Strugglers’ leader Bill Lake, guitarist Chris Prowse, harmonica and mandolin player Andrew Delahunty, jazz bassist Patrick Bleakley and drummer Ian Parker.

=== Mike Garner ===
Mike Garner has lived in New Zealand since 1988 and has gained a reputation as one of NZ's most experienced blues performers. He has performed in the UK, Italy, Germany, Australia, New Caledonia, Japan, Kathmandu and the Cook Islands. Mike is a regular performer at jazz and blues festivals in New Zealand.

=== Neil Billington ===
Neil Billington is one of the leading exponents of the harmonica to come out of New Zealand. He is equally at home playing in the ‘Chicago-style’ of Little Walter on the blues harp or reflecting the more sophisticated jazz sensibilities of Belgian jazz great, Jean ‘Toots’ Thielemans, on chromatic harmonica.

=== Kokomo ===
Kokomo is a blues & roots group, based in New Zealand's Bay of Plenty. Originally 'Kokomo Blues', the group was formed in 1991. The band has toured extensively throughout New Zealand, performing at major rock, blues, jazz and folk festivals. The band has released a dozen albums and a full-length concert DVD, Kokomo a Gogo (2008). Latest album is Sunset Claws (2019).

== Blues clubs ==
=== Auckland Blues Music Club ===
The Auckland Blues Music Club was first established in 2007 and although several name and management changes have occurred over the years, it has continued to stand the test of time and maintain its status as Auckland's most prominent host of blues music events.

=== Capital Blues Inc. ===
Capital Blues Inc. is a Wellington blues club which runs live music nights every Friday night in Wellington. The idea for a Wellington blues club was formed in 1995 by musician Pip Payne along with local musos Dougal Speir and Dave Head. First venue was 'The Venue' (1996) followed by 'Bill Direen's' (1997) and later the 'Hotel Bristol' (1998 - 2018) and now 'Jack Hacketts Irish Pub' where it continues.

Musicians of note who performed in the early the years at the club include, Midge Marsden, Darren Watson, Doug Macleod (USA), Hammond Gamble, Dave Murphy, Wayne Mason Band, The Windy City Strugglers, The Pauas, Marg Layton, Brannigan Kaa, Kokomo & Kokomo Blues, The Whitireia Blues Experience, Mike Garner, Billy Tk Junior, Neil Billington Band, Julian Dixon And Matt Hay, Kayte and the Barflies, Jan Preston, Barry Saunders And Caroline Easther, Pugsley Buzzard (AUS), The John O’connor Experiment, Shayn Hurricane Wills and the Zephyr Hunters, Tin Pan Alley, Velox Brothers, The Behemoths, Red Dog Saloon Band, Greeny and the Mac, Henpicked, Al Witham Band, London Underground, The Business, Laura Collins Band, Frankie and the Bee, Rodger Fox & The NZ School Of Music, Bullfrog Rata and The Alligators, The Legal Tender Band, The Pickups, Carol Bean & Blue Highways, Pip Payne And Rhythm Method, Blues Buffet With Erna Ferry, Silverline, Adam Waldron & Friends, Bob Cooper-Grundy & Friends, Hutt River Ramble, Strange Brew, The Murray Brothers, El Bastardo Banditos!, Wellington Heads, The Cattlestops, The Kemptones.

The current Capital Blues Inc. committee (2018) comprises: President and Booking Agent, Damian Forlong, Vice President: Skye Anderson, Treasurer & Membership officer: Julie Lamb, Webmaster and BluzNuz editor, Rob Hole.

=== Poverty Bay Blues Club (Gisborne) ===
Founded 2006. The first Tuesday of each Month at The Dome Cinema and Bar Gisborne. Local and invited musicians.

=== Hamilton Blues Society NZ ===
Founded in 1995 by local blues stalwart Mike Garner, the Hamilton Blues Society has hosted many of the countries major blues musicians such as Midge Marsden, Ronnie Taylor plus many many more. Over the years the HBS has also hosted artists from overseas.

=== Taranaki Blues Society ===
The Taranaki Blues Society is based in New Plymouth NZ.

=== The Bay of Plenty Blues Club ===
The BOP Blues Club is based in Rotorua NZ.
