= You Make the Whole World Smile =

1992 single by Hammond Gamble

Single by Hammond Gamble
- Released: 1992

Hammond Gamble singles chronology
"Jewel" (1987)	"You Make the Whole World Smile" (1992)	"You Make the Whole World Smile" (1993)

"You Make the Whole World Smile" is a song by New Zealand singer-songwriter Hammond Gamble, recorded as part of the Red Nose Band called "Hammond Gamble & The Red Nose Gang". The song was the theme song for television adverts for Red Nose Day.

"You Make the Whole World Smile" reached number one in New Zealand in two separate years. It first reached number one in August 1992, and exactly one year later, it topped the RIANZ Singles Chart again after having dropped out of the chart completely. The music video features many famous New Zealanders lip-synching to the song in black and white.

== Charts ==
=== Weekly charts ===
Chart (1992–1993)	Peak position
New Zealand (Recorded Music NZ)	1

=== Year-end charts ===
Chart (1992)	Position
New Zealand (Recorded Music NZ)	21

== Certifications ==
Region	Certification	Certified units/sales
New Zealand (RMNZ)	Gold	5,000^{*}
^{*} Sales figures based on certification alone.

== Anika Moa cover ==
Anika Moa released a charity cover of the song in November 2010 as to fundraise for Cure Kids as part of Red Nose Day, however her version did not chart.
