= Malcolm McNeill =

New Zealand singer

Malcolm Ivan McNeill (born 1945) is a jazz singer from New Zealand, based in Christchurch. He has performed and recorded with a range of international performers, including Dame Cleo Laine and Dame Kiri Te Kanawa. With the latter, he recorded the music album Heart to Heart. He has recorded with the Sydney Symphony Orchestra and has nine studio albums.

He was born in Christchurch on 8 April 1945, and educated at Christchurch Boys' High School and the University of Canterbury.

== Publications ==
In 2020, Malcolm published an analysis of his son, Abraham’s experiences within New Zealand’s mental health system, reflecting on aspects of psychiatric care while setting a broader policy context.
