= One World (The Feelers album) =

Studio album by The Feelers
- Released: 13 November 2006
- Genre: Rock
- Length: 57:33
- Label: Warner

The Feelers chronology
Playground Battle (2003)	One World (2006)	Hope Nature Forgives (2011)

Professional ratings
Review scores
Source	Rating
XtraMSN	3.5/5 stars
Allmusic	4/5 stars

One World is the fourth album released by New Zealand rock band The Feelers. It was released on 13 November 2006 and debuted at number one. The first single from the album, "One World" (catalogue number 5101170362), debuted at number 33 on the New Zealand singles chart. Other songs released as singles include "On a High", "Nothing's More Real", and "Never Get Me Down".

== Track listing ==
All songs written by James Reid, except tracks 7 & 8;written by Reid & Hamish Gee.

1. Weak And The Wounded - 5:25
2. On A High - 4:09
3. One World - 4:23
4. Trying To Get By - 3:39
5. Nothing's More Real - 5:27
6. Last Goodbye - 4:20
7. Southgate - 3:42
8. Washed Away - 5:08
9. No-One's Listening - 3:27
10. Never Get Me Down - 4:49
11. Pretty Place - 4:37
12. Warrior - 4:45
13. We Raised Hell - 3:35
