= In Swings the Tide =

Studio album by Anika Moa
- Released: 8 October 2007
- Recorded: 2006/2007
- Genres: Pop, folk, country
- Length: 41:44
- Label: EMI
- Producer: Anika Moa

Anika Moa chronology
Stolen Hill (2005)	In Swings the Tide (2007)	Love in Motion (2010)

Singles from In Swings the Tide
- 1. "Dreams in My Head" Released: October 2007; 2. "My Old Man" Released: March 2008; 3. "Standing in This Fire" Released: July 2008; 4. "Wise Man Say" Released: June 2009

In Swings the Tide is the third studio album by New Zealand Pop recording artist Anika Moa. It was released on 8 October 2007 by EMI Records. The album reached number six on the New Zealand Albums Chart and was certified Platinum for selling over 15,000 copies.

== Background ==
Songs on the album were inspired by the break-up of a relationship and Moa's father's deteriorating health.

Moa produced the album herself. Mixing of the album was achieved in two weeks, while mastering took one day. "It's been the easiest album I've ever done and the most control I've had over everything", she later said.

== Composition ==
Moa has described the album as "ballady, country, folky pop".

== Tour ==
Moa toured New Zealand to promote In Swings the Tide. She was backed by drummer Nick Gaffney and bassist Chip Matthews on the tour. Folk singer-songwriter Age Pryor opened for her, and Anji Sami, sister of Madeleine Sami, also opened at the Nelson show.

Date	City	Location
6 December 2007	Dunedin	The Backstage
7 December 2007	Christchurch	Al's Bar
8 December 2007	Nelson	School of Music
9 December 2007	Wellington	San Francisco Bathhouse
11 December 2007	Whangārei	Salut
12 December 2007	Kerikeri	The Centre
13 December 2007	Auckland	Transmission Room

Patrick Stowe from The Nelson Mail gave the gig a positive review, praising Moa's "brutal honesty on stage".

== Critical reception ==
In Swings the Tide
Review scores
Source	Rating
The New Zealand Herald	4/5 stars
The Press	5/5 stars
Taranaki Daily News	3.5/5 stars

Russell Baillie of The New Zealand Herald rated In Swings the Tide four stars, commending its "level of songcraft here that wasn't always apparent on her earlier work." Nick Bollinger from New Zealand Listener said that "[In Swings the] Tide strikes a balance between the industry-standard pop of Thinking Room...and the introspection of 2005’s Stolen Hill." Taranaki Daily News' Felicity Rookes gave the album a positive review, commenting that "The intimate nature of the folksy tunes show how Moa has grown lyrically". Vicki Anderson of The Press lauded Moa's songwriting skills, noting the "honesty and rawness of expression and emotion" present on the album. She gave it a perfect score of five stars.

== Commercial reception ==
In Swings the Tide debuted on the New Zealand Albums Chart on 15 October 2007 at number eight. The next week it moved up two places to number six, where it peaked. On 9 December 2007 it was certified gold for shipping 7,500 copies, and on 17 February 2008 it received a platinum certification for 15,000 shipments. The album exited the chart in June 2008, but later re-entered the chart thrice, and spent a total of thirty-nine weeks on the albums chart.

== Singles ==
"Dreams in My Head" was released as the first single from the album on 8 October, the same date as the album's release. The song reached number sixteen on the New Zealand Singles Chart, and spent eighteen weeks on the chart. Luke Sharpe directed the accompanying music video.

== Track listing ==
1. "Wise Man Say" – 3:21
2. "Dreams in My Head" – 3:33
3. "Miss Universe" – 2:23
4. "The Blind Woman" – 4:39
5. "In Swings The Tide" – 3:20
6. "My Old Man" – 4:07
7. "Day In, Day Out" – 2:15
8. "Hangin' Around" – 3:24
9. "Standing in This Fire" – 4:29
10. "Honey You'll Be Alright" – 2:34
11. "You're The Light" – 3:45
12. "Thinking About Tomorrow" – 3:55

== Personnel ==
=== The Band ===
- Anika Moa - vocals, guitar, harmonies
- Nick Gaffaney - drums
- Chip Matthews - bass
- Neil Watson - electric guitar
- Stephanie Brown - piano, keyboards, Clavichord accordion, Hammond organ, vibraphone, glockenspiel
- Andy Lynch - mandolin on Track 7, electric guitar on Track 12, dobro on Track 6
- Brendon Morrow - vibraphone on Track 1
- Brian Smith - clarinet on Track 5, bass flute on Track 6
- Bruce Lynch - lap steel on Track 6
- Miranda Adams - violin on Track 3
- Jeremy Toy - electric guitar on Track 8

=== Harmonies ===
- Anna Coddington on Tracks 2,3,4,7,10 & 11
- Tim Guy on Tracks 4, 7 & 10
- Madeleine Sami on Track 4
- Ned Ngatae on Track 4 & 10
- Kara Rickard on Track 10

=== String Players ===
- 1st Violins: Miranda Adams, Arthur Grabczewski, Pam Jiang, Diana Cochrane
- 2nd Violins: Mark Bennett, William Hanfling, Julia Broom
- Violas: Rob Ashworth, Christine Bowie, Greg McGarity
- Cellos: Claudia Price, Katherine Hebley
