= The Feelers =

New Zealand pop rock band

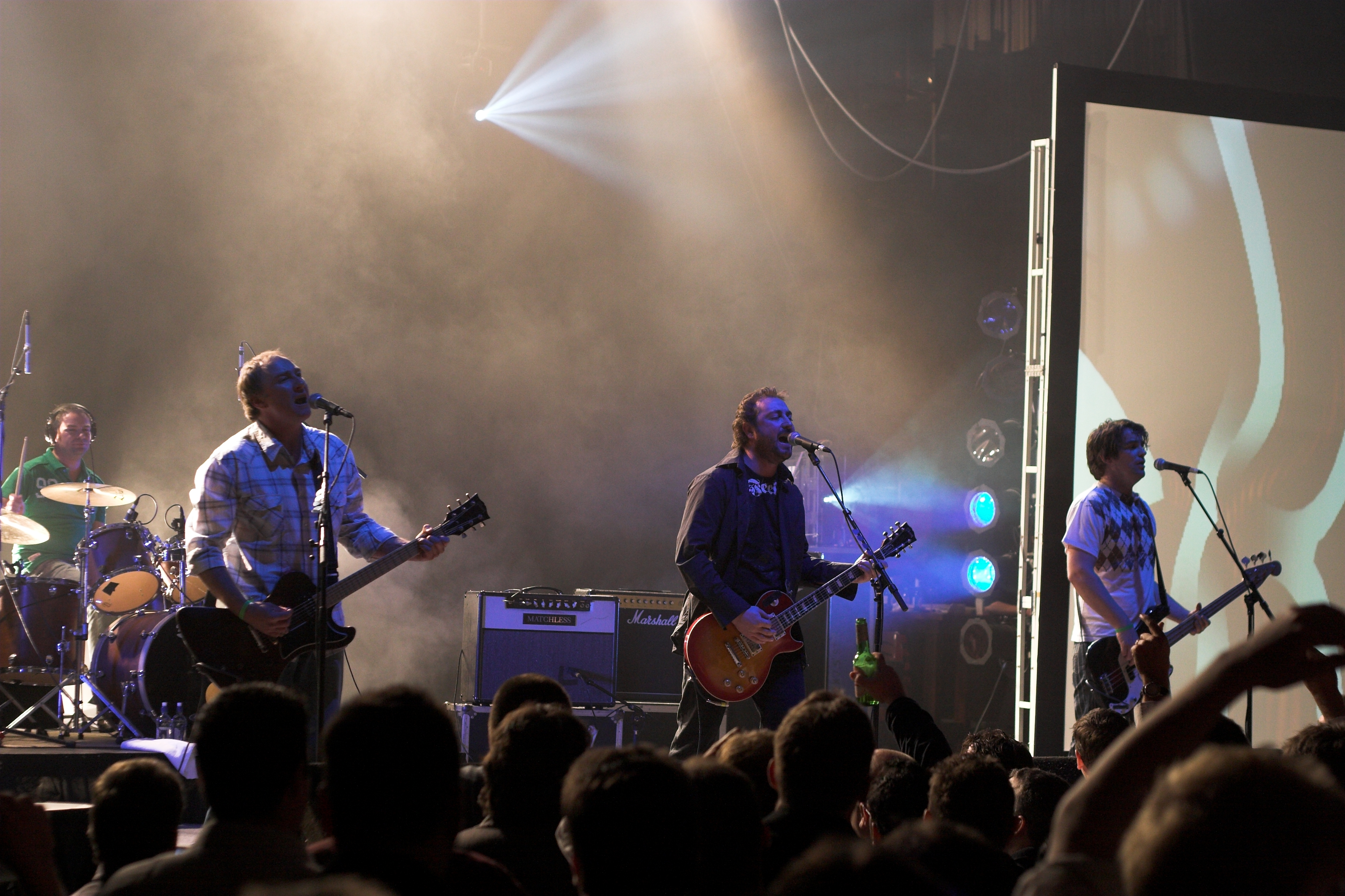

Background information
- Origin: Christchurch, Canterbury, New Zealand
- Genre: Soft Rock
- Years active: 1993–present
- Label: Warner Music Group
- Members: James Reid; Hamish Gee; Andy Lynch; Clinton Harris
- Past members: Matthew Thomas; Matt Short
- Website: Official Feelers website

The Feelers are a New Zealand soft pop rock band formed in the early 1990s in Christchurch by James Reid (singer/guitarist) Mathew Thomas (bass) and Hamish Gee (drums/guitar).

== History ==
The Feelers were signed by Warner Music and released their first album, Supersystem. The album went to number 1 in New Zealand in September 1998, and became the second biggest selling album in the country that year. An instrumental version of single "Pressure Man" featured in 1999 American film Drop Dead Gorgeous during Kirsten Dunst's tap-dancing act. At the 1999 New Zealand Music Awards Supersystem won Album of the Year, Song Writer of the Year (James Reid), Band of the Year, and Producer of the Year (The Feelers and Malcolm Welsford). The band was also awarded the most played song on New Zealand Radio two years running, with "Supersystem" 1998 and "Venus" the following year.

After extensive touring the band started work on their next album, recording demos with Des Broadbery (U2) before starting production with British producer Gil Norton.(The Pixies, Foo Fighters) Released in 2001, Communicate debuted at Number 1.

The band's 2003 album Playground Battle was seen by the band as a new direction. Hitting the number 1 spot again, the album earned The Feelers their third award for the APRA most played song on New Zealand Radio, for "Stand Up".

The band wrote the song "Venus", which, in 1999, won an Apra Silver Scroll award for Most Performed Work.

After further touring around Australasia, USA and Europe, the band started on their fourth album, One World. Released on 13 November 2006, the self-produced album debuted at number one on the New Zealand Album Charts, and also went Platinum in its first week of release, their fourth album to hit the number 1 slot.

In July 2008, The Feelers played a sellout show at the Octagon in Dunedin before an All Blacks vs South Africa test match at Carisbrook. The band performed two new songs, "Beautiful Feeling" and "Narrow Lanes". That October The Feelers embarked on a national "Heartland" Tour, playing acoustic shows in 18 small towns away from the cities, as a way of saying thanks to those who had supported it over its first ten years.

The Feelers released a greatest hits album entitled The Feelers: The Best: '98–'08 in November 2008, which contained 18 songs including two brand new tracks; "Beautiful Feeling" and "Whoever Said". In October 2009 the album earned The Feelers a Tui in the Vodafone New Zealand Music Awards for the highest selling album.

In May 2009 The Feelers members announced that a new album was in production. In September they released details of a competition with MasterCard, where two winners would fly to the Cook Islands, and sing and appear in the video of their single "Blue Skies". In an interview with radio station The Rock FM from Rarotonga that October, The Feelers mentioned that the new album would not be released for several months, but the album did not appear. After extended delays, a new album was finally announced for release in August 2011.

In November 2009, the Feelers announced an annual summer tour, adding an as yet unreleased song to the live gigs, "Open Up The Ground".

In March 2010, the band released a cover version of Jesus Jones hit, "Right Here, Right Now", as the anthem to the 2011 Rugby World Cup advertising campaign. The New Zealand Herald wrote that the announcement had been "widely panned by New Zealanders posting on the social networking site Twitter", though the newspaper added that some had expressed relief that The Feelers had been chosen, over other Kiwi bands.

In 2011, the band released the album Hope Nature Forgives. Their song "Stand Up" featured as the campaign song for the New Zealand National Party during the 2011 New Zealand election.

James Reid's brother is singer-songwriter Donald Reid. Matt Thomas' brother is Gareth Thomas, keyboardist in New Zealand band Goodshirt.

== Solo careers ==
In November 2013, Reid released his first solo album, Saint.

== Members ==
From its formation in the early 1990s until 2008, The Feelers consisted of the same members. In 2008 bassist Matt Thomas departed, replaced by Matt Short and shortly after, long time friend of the band Clint Harris from Opshop joined the band. Guitarist Andy Lynch, who had played guitar for The Feelers on some previous tours, was added permanently to the line-up in 2006.

=== Current ===
- James Reid – vocals, guitar (1993–present)
- Hamish Gee – drums, guitar (1993–present)
- Andy Lynch – guitar (2008–present)
- Clinton Harris – bass (2011–present)
- Andy "Keys" Cochrane – keyboards, guitar (2023–present)

=== Previous ===
- Matt Thomas – bass (1993–2008)
- Tim Skedden – Guitar (1993–2007)
- Matt Short – bass (2008–2011)

== Discography ==
=== The Feelers ===
- Supersystem (1998)
- Communicate (2001)
- Playground Battle (2003)
- One World (2006)
- The Best 98-08 (2008)
- Hope Nature Forgives (2011)
- Reimagined - Greatest Hits (2023)

=== Solo albums ===
==== James Reid ====
- Saint (2013)
