= Darren Watson (musician) =

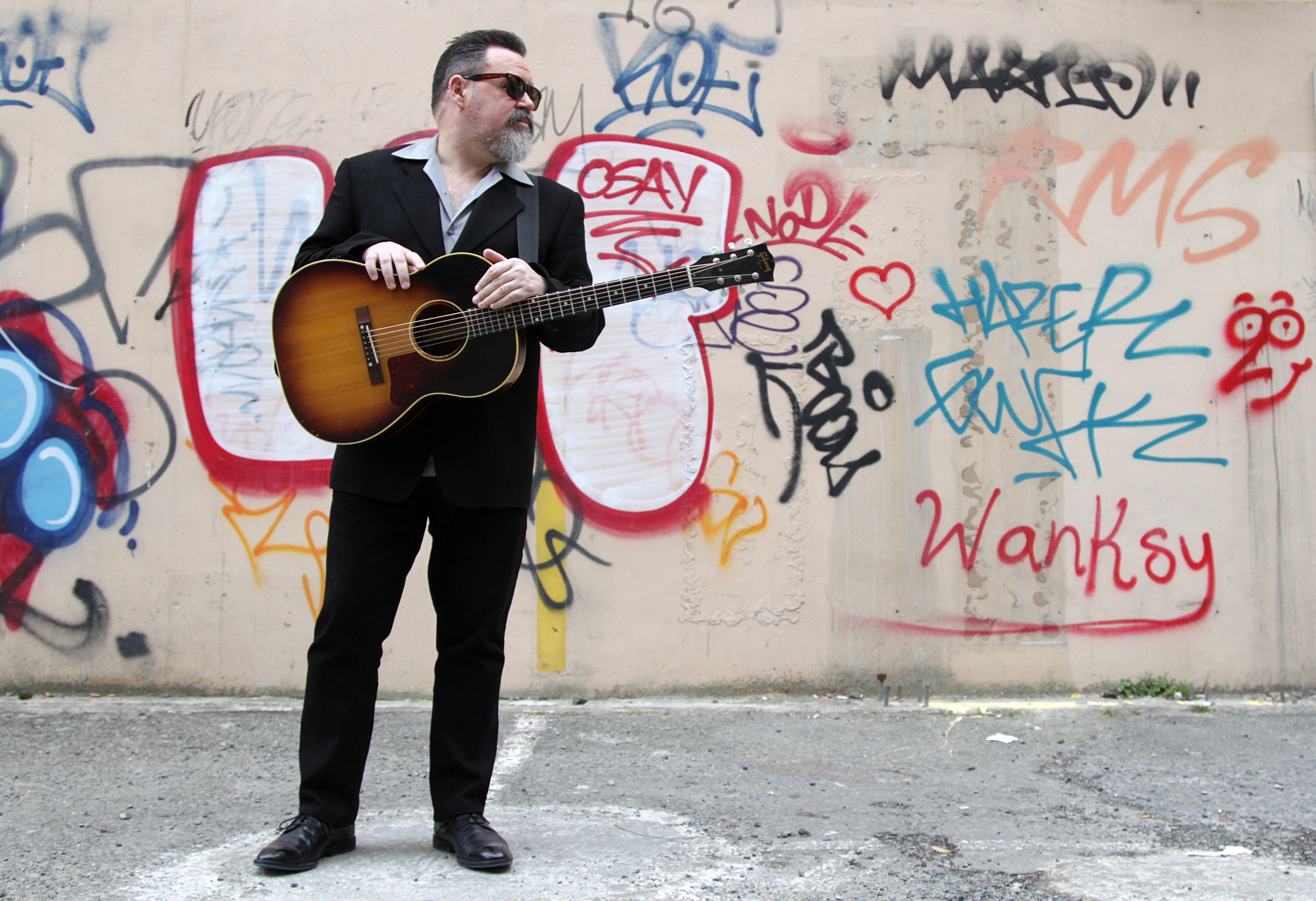

Background information
- Born: Darren Watson
- Origin: Wanganui, North Island, New Zealand.
- Genres: Blues, soul, pop
- Occupation: Musician
- Years active: 1985–present
- Labels: Pagan Records NZ (1988–1998); Red Rocks Records (2005–2011); Beluga Records (2012–2017); Lamington Records (2018-present)
- Website: www.darrenwatson.com

Darren Watson is a New Zealand singer, songwriter and guitarist.

== History ==
Darren Watson was born in Wanganui. His first musical experience was playing drums and trumpet but he soon moved on to guitar and was playing in bars and clubs throughout his years at Hutt Valley High School (1980–83).

In 1985, he formed Chicago Smoke Shop with harmonica player Terry Casey and, although Casey left the band in 1987, the band went on to record two charting LPs and several radio hits. The group was also in big demand as a support act by international touring bands. Between 1987 and 1990, Smoke Shop (the 'Chicago' tag was eventually dropped) opened for NZ tours by Robert Cray (twice), Koko Taylor, George Thorogood, and The Fabulous Thunderbirds.

Watson's first solo album in the blues idiom King Size was released in 2002, it was nominated for Best Roots Album at the 2003 New Zealand Music Awards,

In late April 2009 Darren won first place in the blues section of the prestigious International Songwriting Competition in Nashville, with his song "All Going Wrong", a cut from South Pacific Soul. Judges for the competition included Tom Waits, James Cotton, John Mayall, and Alligator Records president Bruce Iglauer. Watson has gone on to finish on the 'podium' in 2010, judged in third in the blues category of the International Songwriting Competition for "Can't Get Enough of You".

Watson released Saint Hilda's Faithless Boy in November 2010 on Red Rocks Records. The album was widely praised both in local and overseas media.

In February 2012 Darren performed at the Australian Blues Music Festival in Goulburn, New South Wales, and in May of the same year he headlined the Blues on Broadbeach Festival in Queensland.

Watson's fifth solo album Introducing Darren Watson was released on 7 November 2014. The album peaked at number 26 on the Official NZ Top 40 Album Chart and number 6 on the Official Top 20 NZ Albums Chart.

In November 2017 Darren recorded several tracks for a new album with award-winning engineer Lee Prebble at Surgery Studios. The band for the recording included original Chicago Smoke Shop harmonica player Terry Casey, Steve Moodie on double bass, Dayle Jellyman on piano, and Delia Shanly on percussion.

On 10 March 2018, Darren released music video for "National Guy", a song from Too Many Millionaires.

On 1 May 2018, Watson's sixth solo album Too Many Millionaires was released on Beluga Records. The album entered the Official Top 20 NZ Albums Chart at number 3 and the Independent Music New Zealand Top 20 Chart at number one.

Watson toured New Zealand with the album band in support of the new album from 3–26 May 2018.

On 25 September 2020 Watson released his seventh solo album Getting Sober for the End of the World. The album was widely praised in New Zealand with critic Simon Sweetman opining "This is Darren's finest set of recordings." The album debuted at #23 on the NZ Official Top 40 Album Chart. It also charted at #6 on the Official Top 20 NZ Albums Chart. The album was recorded, mixed, and produced by Watson, and included several guest artists including longtime Mavis Staples musical director Rick Holmstrom on guitar on the track Alison Jane.

On 17 December 2020 Recorded Music New Zealand announced that Getting Sober for the End of the World was a finalist for the Te Kaipuoro Taketake Toa | Best Folk Artist award at the 2021 Aotearoa Music Awards.

Darren's latest album Darren Watson sings John Hiatt is an album of covers by respected American songwriter John Hiatt. The album was released on Friday 31 October, 2025. Early reviews have praised the album's sound and musicianship. Noted New Zealand music critic Gary Steel opined: "When Darren Watson sings John Hiatt was first announced, I must admit to wondering about the point of the exercise. Does the world really need a John Hiatt covers album? Having percolated in the album’s sound-world over the past few weeks, I now feel a little ashamed of that assumption. The album is a doozy."

Watson is touring to promote the album during November and December 2025.

== "Planet Key" ==
In August 2014, Watson released the single "Planet Key", which satirised the New Zealand prime minister John Key. As the song had been released in the run-up to the 2014 general election, the Electoral Commission advised that the song would be viewed as an electoral programme and therefore could not be played on New Zealand television or radio, nor could it be sold unless it was labelled as an election advertisement.

Watson chose to remove the song from the iTunes Store, claiming the commission's advice was censorship. John Key commented that the song and its music video was, "quite professionally done. It was anti-us but as a parody it was okay."

In September, before the general election, Watson took the Electoral Commission to the New Zealand High Court to challenge their advice. Justice Denis Clifford reserved his decision, saying the issues were complex.

On 2 April, in a landmark 76-page judgment, Justice Denis Clifford ruled comprehensively in favour of Watson and Jones. Significantly, he held that the Electoral Commission's interpretation of the legislation "would impose limits on the right of freedom of expression of the plaintiffs and New Zealand citizens more generally in a manner which... cannot be demonstrably justified in a free and democratic society."

The Electoral Commission immediately appealed Justice Clifford's ruling, and on 20 October 2016 the Court of Appeal ruled for Watson, saying Watson and animator Jeremy Jones were "not representing any political party or vested interest when they made the video", the court said, and were "simply expressing their own political views".

== Discography ==
=== Albums ===
Year	Title	Details	Peak chart positions
Year	Title	Details	NZ
1989	Chicago Smoke Shop: Chicago Smoke Shop	Released: May 1989; Label: Pagan; Catalogue: PAL1045; Formats: 12" vinyl, Cassette	47
1990	Smoke Shop: So Glad	Released: July 1990; Label: Pagan; Catalogue: PAL1089; Formats: 12" vinyl, CD, Cassette	29
1996	Smoke Shop: Fusion at Room Temperature	Released: May 1996; Label: Pagan; Catalogue: 4712112; Formats: CD	—
1998	Overnight Sensations	Released: February 1998; Label: Pagan; Catalogue: PACD1138; Format: CD	—
2002	King Size	Released: 10 October 2002; Label: Beluga Records; Catalogue: BELNZ001; Formats: CD, digital	—
2005	South Pacific Soul	Released: 15 November 2005; Label: Red Rocks Records; Catalogue: RRR007; Formats: CD, digital	—
2010	Saint Hilda's Faithless Boy	Released: 27 October 2010; Label: RRR104; Catalogue: Red Rocks Records; Formats: CD, digital	—
2014	Introducing Darren Watson	Released: 7 November 2014; Label: Beluga Records; Catalogue: BELNZ002; Formats: CD, digital	26
2018	Too Many Millionaires	Released: 1 May 2018; Label: Beluga Records; Catalogue: BELNZ004; Formats: 12" vinyl, CD, digital	20
2020	Getting Sober for the End of the World	Released: 25 September 2020; Label: Lamington Records; Catalogue: LAM001; Formats: CD, digital	23
2025	Darren Watson Sings John Hiatt	Released: 31 October 2025; Label: Lamington Records; Catalogue: LAM002; Formats: CD, digital	31
"—" denotes a recording that did not chart.

==== Guest appearances ====
- Bill Lake – Home Truths (1996)
- Marg Layton – Trouble Then Satisfaction (1998)
- Bend – The Underwatermelon Man (1999)
- Midge Marsden – Travel N' Time (2006)
- Matt Hay – Inside Stories (2007)
- Bill Hickman – Crossbones (2019)

=== Singles ===
Year	Single	Peak chart positions		Album
Year	Single	NZ Artists	NZ Singles	Album
1989	"Mind on My Sleeve"	—	37	Chicago Smoke Shop
1989	"(You Want) Another Man"	—	—	Chicago Smoke Shop
1990	"I Can't Live (Without Your Love)"	—	—	So Glad
1990	"So Glad"	—	—	So Glad
2014	"Planet Key"	5	—	Non-album single
"—" denotes releases that did not chart.

== Awards ==
Year	Award	Category	Result
1990	NZ Music Awards	Most Promising Group (Chicago Smoke Shop)	Nominated
1990	NZ Music Awards	Most Promising Male Vocal	Nominated
1993	Wellington Music Awards	Outstanding Overall Performer	Won
1996	Wellington Music Awards	Best Blues Performer	Won
2003	NZ Music Awards	Best Roots Album	Nominated
2008	International Songwriting Competition	Blues	Won
2009	International Songwriting Competition	Blues	3rd Place
2010	International Songwriting Competition	Blues	Hon. Mention
2012	International Songwriting Competition	Blues	Hon. Mention
2016	International Songwriting Competition	Blues	Hon. Mention
2018	International Songwriting Competition	Blues	Hon. Mention
2021	Aotearoa Music Awards	Best Folk Artist	Nominated
