= Communicate (The Feelers album) =

Studio album by The Feelers
- Released: 12 October 2001
- Recorded: York Street Studios, Auckland; Church Studios, London
- Genre: Rock
- Length: 52:00
- Label: Warner
- Producer: Gil Norton

The Feelers chronology
Supersystem (1998)	Communicate (2001)	Playground Battle (2003)

Communicate, released on 12 October 2001, is the second album by New Zealand rock band The Feelers. The album reached number 1 on the New Zealand music charts with double platinum sales.

== Track listing ==
No.	Title	Writer(s)	Length
1.	"Sex Show"	James Reid, Matt Thomas, Hamish Gee	3:34
2.	"Communicate"	Reid, Donald Reid	2:59
3.	"As Good As It Gets"	Reid, Thomas, Gee	3:57
4.	"Fragile"	Reid, Thomas, Gee	3:52
5.	"Fishing For Lisa"	Reid, Thomas, Gee	2:59
6.	"Just Like You"	Reid, Thomas, Gee	3:54
7.	"Forest"	Reid, Thomas, Gee	5:31
8.	"More To Prove"	Reid, Tim Skedden	4:03
9.	"Astronaut"	Reid, Thomas, Gee	4:06
10.	"Accidental Love"	Reid, Thomas, Gee	4:51
11.	"Anniversary"	Reid, Thomas, Gee	3:30
12.	"Flood"	Reid, Thomas, Gee	3:50
13.	"The Web"	Reid, D Reid	4:36
