= Dreams in My Head =

Single by Anika Moa

from the album In Swings the Tide
- Released: 8 October 2007
- Length: 3:35 (single); 3:33 (album version)
- Label: EMI/Flightless Birds
- Songwriter: Anika Moa

Anika Moa singles chronology
"Wrestled With Your Angels" (2005)	"Dreams in My Head" (2007)	"My Old Man" (2008)

"Dreams In My Head" is the lead single from In Swings the Tide, New Zealand singer-songwriter Anika Moa's third studio album. It was released on 8 October 2007.

A New Zealand Herald review of the album said it "soon finds its feet on the lush single Dreams In My Head." The tune was nominated in 2008 for an APRA Silver Scroll Award.

== Chart performance ==
"Dreams In My Head" entered the New Zealand Singles Chart on 15 October 2007, a week after its release, at No. 17. It peaked at No. 16. The single remained in the chart for a total of 18 consecutive weeks.

== Certifications ==
Region	Certification	Certified units/sales
New Zealand (RMNZ)	Gold	7,500^{*}
^{*} Sales figures based on certification alone.
