= Stolen Hill =

Studio album by Anika Moa
- Released: 1 August 2005
- Recorded: Bethells Beach
- Genre: Pop
- Length: 46:17
- Label: Warner Music NZ
- Producers: Edmund McWilliams, Jr, Anika Moa

Anika Moa chronology
Thinking Room (2001)	Stolen Hill (2005)	In Swings The Tide (2007)

Stolen Hill is the second studio album by New Zealand recording artist Anika Moa, released on 1 August 2005 by Warner Music NZ. The album was certified gold and has sold over 7,500 copies.

== Background ==
Anika Moa said that the album contrasts with her debut, Thinking Room; "Stolen Hill is not as over-produced; more sparse, more feeling, more family-like, more Māori, more me...[it] is just me growing up".

The title track of the album relates to the poor treatment of Māori during the New Zealand Wars.

== Promotion and reception ==
In September 2005, Moa announced twenty-two shows in a nationwide album tour in October that year, two months after the album's release.

Grant Smithies of The Sunday Star-Times gave Stolen Hill four stars, calling it "poignant and original", while Russell Baillie of The New Zealand Herald gave it only three stars, criticising several songs' "unlikely marriage of style and subject," and called it an album of "oddball character." Nick Bollinger from New Zealand Listener said "Stolen Hill finds Moa maturing and discovering her own sound, but it feels like a work in progress. Although full of charm and unmistakable in its locale, the styles Moa toys with sometimes appear borrowed; as if she is trying them on and still making up her mind which ones fit her best."

== Track listing ==
All songs written by Anika Moa except "Wrestled with Your Angels" by Moa and Adam Peters.

No.	Title	Length
1.	"Ka Whakahuia Ano"	1:51
2.	"In the Morning"	4:17
3.	"Lies in This Land"	4:32
4.	"Picture Me in The 70's"	3:48
5.	"Stolen Hill"	4:39
6.	"Broken Man"	3:03
7.	"Loving You"	4:34
8.	"Annie Goes to Sleep"	5:06
9.	"Wrestled with Your Angels"	5:15
10.	"Society"	3:48
11.	"Papercuts"	4:18
12.	"Kotahitanga"	1:00
Total length:		46:17

Source: Spotify.

== Chart performance ==
The album debuted on the New Zealand Albums Chart in August 2005 at number six. In the album's second week it was certified gold, selling over 7,500 albums. The album spent a total of eight weeks in the chart.

== Personnel ==
- Anika Moa – acoustic guitar, harmonies, percussion, kōauau, production vocals
- Willy Scott – drums
- Neil Watson – electric guitar
- Stephanie Brown – Rhodes piano
- Aaron Murphy – bass
- Nick Gaffaney – drums (on "In the Morning")
- Georgina Cooper – cello (on "Stolen Hill")
- Dion Taylor – slide guitar (on "Loving You")
- Anna Coddington – backing vocals
- Edmund McWilliams, Jr – production, backing vocals
- Madelein Sami – backing vocals
- Bic Runga – backing vocals

Source: CD liner
