= Falling in Love Again (Anika Moa song) =

Single by Anika Moa

from the album Thinking Room
- Released: 2002
- Genre: Pop
- Length: 3:49
- Label: Atlantic
- Songwriter(s): James Charles Reid, Anika Moa

Anika Moa singles chronology
"Good in My Head" (2002)	"Falling in Love Again" (2002)	"Mother" (2002)

"Falling in Love Again" is a single by New Zealand singer-songwriter Anika Moa. It features on her début album, Thinking Room.

== Chart performance ==
The single entered the New Zealand Singles Chart at number fifty, and peaked at number five. It spent a total of twenty-four weeks in the chart. It also spent one week in the Australian Singles Chart at number sixty-one.

=== Year-end charts ===
Chart (2002)	Position
New Zealand (Recorded Music NZ)	11
