= Playground Battle =

Studio album by The Feelers
- Released: 28 November 2003 (NZ)
- Recorded: York Street Studios, Auckland; Sing Sing, Melbourne
- Genre: Rock
- Length: 47:00
- Label: Warner
- Producer: Greg Haver

The Feelers chronology
Communicate (2001)	Playground Battle (2003)	One World (2006)

Professional ratings
Review scores
Source	Rating
Allmusic	link
varsity.co.nz	Archived 30 June 2004 at the Wayback Machine

Playground Battle is the third album by New Zealand Rock Band The Feelers. It includes the number-one hits: "Larger Than Life" and "The Fear". Other singles include "Playground Battle", "Supernova" and "Stand Up". Since its release, a second version, The Special Limited Edition, was released including a seven-track bonus disc including five re-mastered live tracks recorded from the bands hugely popular 2005 New Zealand tour. The album climbed to over three times platinum on New Zealand music charts.

== Track listing ==
All songs written by James Reid, except tracks 1 & 5;written by James Reid & Donald Reid.

1. Weapons of War – 4:14
2. Playground Battle – 3:22
3. Larger Than Life – 3:37
4. The Fear – 4:59
5. Fallout Shelter – 4:17
6. Labyrinth – 2:30
7. Supernova – 3:54
8. All Connected – 4:33
9. Rain – 3:35
10. Emotional Allstar – 3:56
11. Military Precision – 3:06
12. Unleash The Fury – 4:40
13. Stand Up – 4:00

== Special Limited Edition Bonus Disc ==
1. Weapons of War [Live]
2. Pressure Man [Live]
3. As Good As It Gets [Live]
4. Larger Than Life [Live]
5. Venus [Live]
6. Dancing on Water
7. Eyes of the World
