= Thinking Room =

Studio album by Anika Moa
- Released: 28 September 2001
- Studio: Sear Sound, New York City
- Genre: Pop
- Length: 48:49
- Label: Warner Music
- Producer: Victor Van Vugt

Anika Moa chronology
Thinking Room (2001)	Stolen Hill (2005)

Alternative Cover

Singles from Thinking Room
- 1. "Youthful" Released: 4 February 2002; 2. "Good in My Head" Released: 2002; 3. "Falling in Love Again" Released: 2002; 4. "Mother" Released: 2002

Thinking Room is the debut album by New Zealand Pop recording artist Anika Moa, released on 28 September 2001, by Warner, Atlantic Records. It reached the number one spot on the New Zealand Albums Chart and was certified as double platinum, selling over 30,000 copies in New Zealand.

== Chart performance ==
The album debuted at number one on the New Zealand charts in October, 2001, and stayed in the top spot for two weeks. The album has gone double platinum, having sold over 30,000 copies, and yielding four hit singles, two of which ("Youthful" and "Falling in Love Again") peaked at number five on the New Zealand Singles Chart.

"Falling in Love Again" featured in the film America's Sweethearts in 2001.

== Track listing ==
All songs written and composed by Anika Moa, along with others credited for specific tracks below.

No.	Title	Writer(s)	Length
1.	"Good in My Head"		4:34
2.	"Flowers For You"		4:14
3.	"Falling in Love Again"	James Reid	3:48
4.	"I Talked to You"	Adam Peters	3:22
5.	"My Son"		5:01
6.	"Holding Me High"	Tim Groenendaal	4:23
7.	"Mother"		4:04
8.	"Youthful"		4:16
9.	"God in His Culture"		5:08
10.	"Everything's the Same"	Peters	4:51
11.	"Harry & Leena's Song"		5:09

== Personnel ==
Musicians

- Anika Moa – vocals (all tracks), acoustic guitar (1, 2, 4–7, 10, 11), electric guitar (10), keyboards (10)
- Des Broadbery – additional programming (9)
- Matt Chamberlain – drums (1, 2, 5–8, 10, 11), percussion (1, 2, 5, 7, 10)
- Knox Chandler – bass (5, 11), electric guitar (1, 3, 5, 8), mandolin (5, 8)
- Sean Eden – electric guitar (6, 7)
- Chris Feinstein – bass (1, 2, 6–8, 10)
- Adam Peters – backing vocals (10, 11), cello (1, 2, 6, 7, 9), acoustic guitar (2, 8), electric guitar (1, 3, 5–7, 10), keyboards (3–6, 9–11), programming (4–6, 9, 11)
- Britta Phillips – backing vocals (8)
- Chad Royce – percussion (5, 8, 11)
- Eric Schermerhorn – acoustic guitar (1–3, 6, 8, 10, 11), 12-string acoustic guitar (2, 5, 6), electric guitar (3, 8)
- Bruce Smith – drum programming (3)
- Victor Van Vugt – programming (5)

Technical

- Victor Van Vugt – production (all tracks), recording (all tracks), mixing (1, 2, 4–11)
- Chris Lord-Alge – mixing (3)
- Kaori Kinoshita – engineering assistance
- Stephen Marcussen – mastering (all tracks)
- Steve Mazur – engineering assistance
- Matt Silva – engineering assistance
- Stewart Whitmore – digital editing

Design & management

- Richard Bates – art direction, design
- Christina Dittmar – art direction, design
- Tracy Magan / Tim Groenendaal – management
- Craig Owen – photography
- Skye Peyton – photography
- John Rubeli – artists and repertoire

Source: CD liner

== Charts ==
=== Weekly charts ===
Chart (2001)	Peak position
New Zealand Albums (RMNZ)	1

=== Year-end charts ===
Chart (2002)	Position
New Zealand Albums (RMNZ)	18
