= Anika Moa =

New Zealand recording artist and television presenter

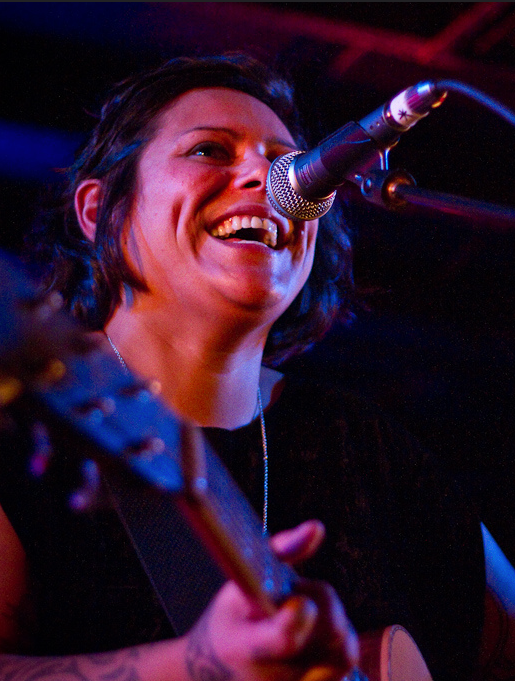
- Moa performing in Wellington, June 2010

Background information
- Also known as: DJ Unika
- Born: Anika Rose Moa; 21 May 1980 (age 46); Papakura, New Zealand
- Origin: Christchurch, New Zealand
- Genre: Pop
- Occupations: TV presenter; musician
- Instruments: Vocals; guitar; percussion; keyboards
- Years active: 1998–present
- Labels: Warner/Atlantic; EMI
- Spouses: Angela Fyfe (m. 2010; div. 2013) Natasha Utting (m. 2014; sep. 2021)

Anika Rose Moa (born 21 May 1980) is a New Zealand recording artist and television presenter. Her debut studio album Thinking Room, was released in September 2001, which reached number one on the New Zealand Albums Chart and provided two Top 5 singles, "Youthful" (2001) and "Falling in Love Again" (2002). Moa competed at the Rockquest songwriting contest in 1998, which led to a recording contract. She is the subject of two documentaries by film-maker Justin Pemberton: 3 Chords and the Truth: the Anika Moa Story (2003), detailing her signing to a record label and the release of Thinking Room, and In Bed with Anika Moa (2010) on her later career.

== Early life ==
Anika Moa was born in 1980 in the Auckland suburb of Papakura. She grew up in Christchurch and attended Hornby High School. Her father Tia, who died in 2007, was Māori (Ngāpuhi, Te Aupōuri) and her mother Bernadette is of English descent. Moa and her siblings were raised by Bernadette, who was a member of a band, which performed three days a week. Moa met Tia at 13 – he gave her a guitar and encouraged her to learn songwriting on it. While at secondary school she joined musicals, choirs and rock bands.

== Music career ==
=== 1998–2007: Thinking Room to Stolen Hill ===
In 1998, Moa won an award for Most Promising Female Musician and a music school scholarship at the New Zealand Smokefreerockquest high school music competition. After recording a demo tape, she signed a record deal with Warner Music in New Zealand and Atlantic Records in New York. She moved to New York to record her first album, Thinking Room (September 2001), with Victor Van Vugt producing. Her lead single, "Youthful", appeared in July 2001, which reached No. 5 on the New Zealand Singles Chart. Moa became homesick and uncomfortable with the "superficial" imagery used by her manager to promote her. In 2002 she returned to Auckland.

She released her second album Stolen Hill on 1 August 2005, describing the album as "more sparse" and true to herself, compared to her first. One track, "In the Morning", refers to her abortion in 2000. The album was certified gold. She toured New Zealand in October of that year. In 2005 Moa was one of many New Zealand musicians who contributed to single "Anchor Me", which commemorated the twentieth anniversary of the bombing of the Rainbow Warrior.

=== 2007–2012: In Swings the Tide, civil union and Love in Motion ===
In October 2007 Moa released her third studio album, In Swings The Tide, which went platinum and won a number of rave reviews. For the first time she was credited with producing the album alone. In 2009 The New Zealand Herald named Moa as one of the "Top 10 Kiwi music successes of the past 10 years".

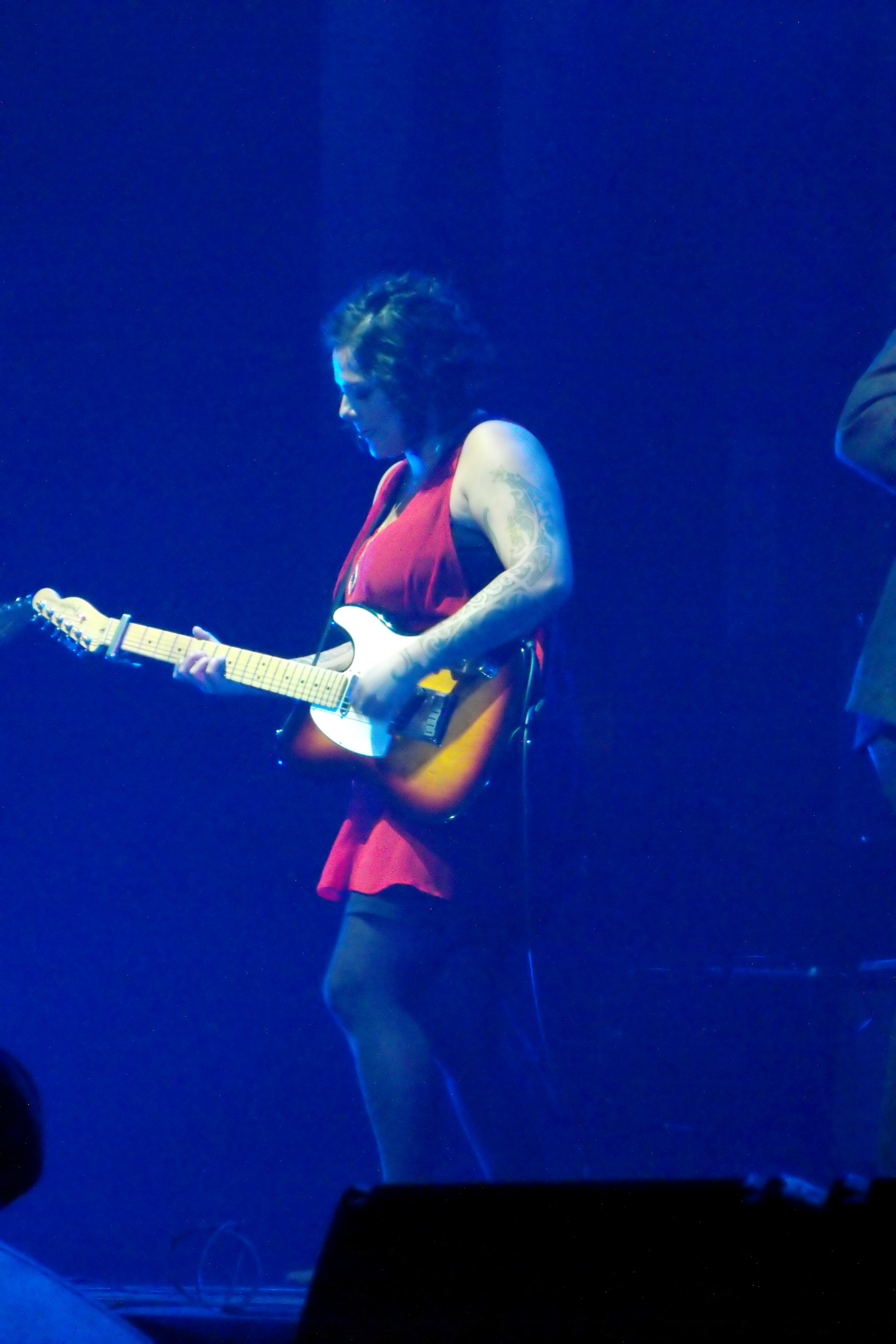
Moa performing "Running Through the Fire" at the 2010 New Zealand Music Awards.

Moa came out as openly lesbian in 2007. She entered into a civil union with Australian burlesque dancer, Azaria Universe (Angela Fyfe), in February 2010. Her partner was the inspiration for Moa's fourth album, Love in Motion (March 2010), which peaked at number four. Fyfe became pregnant with twins in the following year.

To support the album, she embarked on a nationwide tour from October to December 2010. Moa has collaborated with other New Zealand solo artists, SJD and Bic Runga. She performed with the band, Dimmer, in a backup and touring capacity. She has DJed under the name, DJ Unika.

=== 2013: Peace of Mind, separation and Songs for Bubbas ===
In February 2013 Moa teamed with Boh Runga and Hollie Smith to release an album, Peace of Mind. Moa and Fyfe separated, and they have joint custody of the twins. In November 2013 she released her first children's album, Songs for Bubbas.

== Television and radio work ==
=== All Talk with Anika Moa (2016–2017) ===
In September 2016 Moa debuted her interview talk show All Talk with Anika Moa, which was broadcast for the Māori Television, developed with support from NZ on Air. The show is filmed in front of a small studio audience, and has featured appearances from a number of New Zealand celebrities including actor Temuera Morrison and musician Stan Walker. There were two series developed, each consisting of 10 episodes, as well as a special episode highlighting moments from the series. The final episode of series two aired in July 2017.

=== Anika Moa Unleashed (2018) ===
In March 2018, Moa debuted a new interview show, Anika Moa Unleashed, available online through TVNZ OnDemand. In 2019 the show started showing on TVNZ 1 on Saturday nights. The show features Moa visiting the homes of notable New Zealand celebrities, public figures, and personalities. She has reportedly signed to develop twelve episodes.

=== Other appearances ===
In April 2018, Moa had a stint as a television presenter for the current affairs programme Seven Sharp, filling in for Jeremy Wells. She co-hosted alongside Hilary Barry for several episodes. Her final broadcast was on 20 April.

She started working at radio network NZME in August 2019, first working at The Hits, later moving to the breakfast show on Flava, which she co-hosted until late 2022, before leaving to focus on her music career. She also appears on the kids TV series Toi Time. In 2022, she appeared in the episode of Wellington Paranormal as Birdwoman.

== Activism ==
In December 2012, Moa starred in an online video campaign supporting gay marriage, alongside New Zealand singers Hollie Smith and Boh Runga, as well as Olympian Danyon Loader and former Governor-General Dame Catherine Tizard. She was openly critical of New Zealand's National-led government until it left office in 2017.

== Awards and nominations ==
APRA Awards

Year	Nominee / work	Award	Result
2005	"Stolen Hill"	APRA Silver Scroll	Nominated
2008	"Dreams in My Head"	APRA Silver Scroll	Nominated
2010	"Running Through the Fire (Storm)"	APRA Silver Scroll	Nominated

New Zealand Music Awards

Year	Nominee / work	Award	Result
2002	Thinking Room	Album of the Year	Nominated
2002	Thinking Room	Top Female vocalist	Won
2002	Thinking Room	International Achievement	Nominated
2002	"Youthful"	Single of the Year	Nominated
2002	"Youthful"	Songwriter of the Year	Won
2006	Stolen Hill	Best Female Solo Artist	Nominated
2006	Stolen Hill	Best Aotearoa Roots Album	Nominated
2008	In Swings the Tide	Nokia Album of the Year	Nominated
2008	In Swings the Tide	Mazda Best Female Solo Artist	Won
2010	Love in Motion	Vodafone Album of the Year	Nominated
2010	Love in Motion	Mazda Best Female Solo Artist	Won
2010	Love in Motion	Best Pop Album	Nominated

== Discography ==
- Thinking Room (2001)
- Stolen Hill (2005)
- In Swings the Tide (2007)
- Love in Motion (2010)
- Songs for Bubbas (2013)
- Queen at the Table (2015)
- Songs for Bubbas 2 (2016)
- Anika Moa (2018)
- Songs for Bubbas 3 (2019)
