= Geoff Maddock =

New Zealand musician

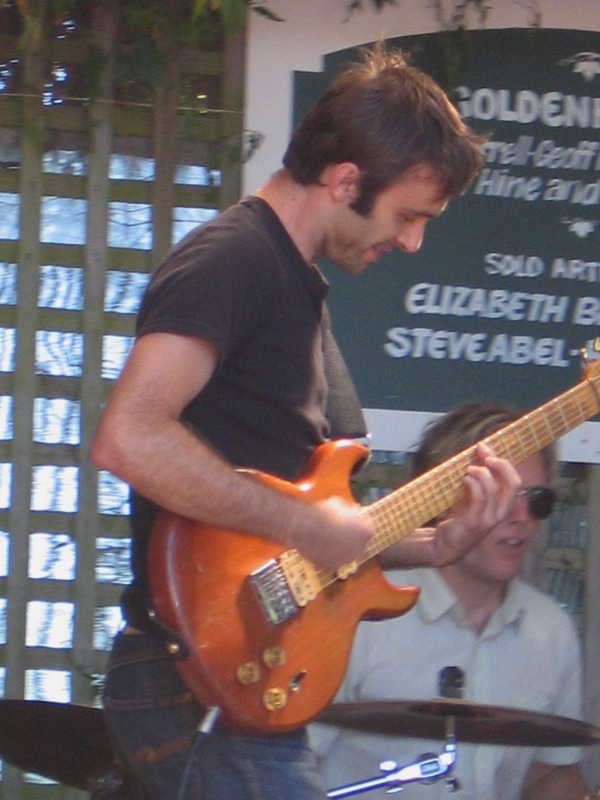
- Maddock onstage with Goldenhorse in 2005

Background information
- Also known as: Geoff Creeting
- Born: 1972 or 1973 (age 53–54)
- Occupations: Song-writer, producer, multi-instrumentalist
- Instruments: Guitar, bass, drums, keyboards
- Years active: 1991–present
- Labels: Flying Nun Records, Siren Records
- Member of: Goldenhorse, Bressa Creeting Cake

Geoff Maddock (born 1972 or 1973) is a New Zealand musician, composer, and producer. He is best known as a member of the rock group Bressa Creeting Cake and for co-founding Goldenhorse, for which he was a central creative force as a song-writer, producer, and guitarist.

Maddock became involved in music as a teenager at Avondale College, where he formed Bressa Creeting Cake with Edmund McWilliams and Joel Wilton in 1991. The band's tracks received regular play on the local radio station bFM, and they later signed to Flying Nun Records. The band released one EP and performed in support of The Mutton Birds and Hunters & Collectors, before parting ways in the late 90s. Maddock then formed Goldenhorse with Kirsten Morrell in 1999.

Maddock co-wrote and produced the hit single "Maybe Tomorrow" from Riverhead (2002), which was awarded an APRA Silver Scroll Award for Most Performed New Zealand Work after becoming the most played song on New Zealand radio in 2003. Maddock was twice-nominated for an APRA Silver Scroll Award for his writing on Out of the Moon (2005) and Reporter (2007), for the singles "Out of the Moon" and "Say My Name", respectively.

In addition to his production and music work with bands, Maddock is also a composer. In 2004, he produced the arrangements for two special Goldenhorse performances with the Auckland Philharmonic Orchestra and Christchurch Symphony Orchestra. Following the effective breakup of Goldenhorse in 2007, Maddock wrote the soundtrack for Katie Wolfe's 2008 short-film This Is Her, and the music for Michael Galvin's play "Station to Station".

In 2014, Maddock relocated to Los Angeles with Nick Gaffaney, where he formed Young Winona with Gaffaney's wife, Cass. Throughout the 2010s, Maddock continued work as a producer with various artists both in New Zealand and Los Angeles, and also as a session musician. Young Winona released several tracks from 2019 until 2023, when Gaffaney moved to Las Vegas, putting the band in an indefinite hiatus.

A multi-instrumentalist, Maddock has numerous credits to his name for his instrumental work and song-writing, including on projects by The Wedding Present, Natasha Beddingfield, Daniel Beddingfield, The Finn Brothers, Bic Runga, Anika Moa, and former band mate Kirsten Morrell, to name some.

== Early and personal life ==
Geoff Maddock was born in 1972 or 1973, and grew up in Avondale, Auckland. He attended Avondale College.

Maddock was formerly in a long-term relationship with fellow band mate Kirsten Morrell. In 2014 he moved to Los Angeles, where he currently resides.

== Career ==
=== 1991–1998: Bressa Creeting Cake ===
In 1991, Maddock co-founded the band Breast Secreting Cake with Edmund McWilliams and Joel Wilton. McWilliams and Maddock were both attending Avondale College and met during an art class. At a school talent show, the pair took notice of Joel Wilton, who was a drummer. The group played together at school performances. During their first public gigs and early effort to record music, the band expanded its lineup to include Dave Neilsen on bass.

The band's first recordings were made by McWilliams on four tracks, then with the help of Neilsen on a 16-track studio the band was lent. Some of their songs were played on the local college radio station bFM by 1994, and the band had a stream of top 10 placings on the station's playlist.

The group initially struggled to find a label, despite other local music acts taking interest. Andrew Fagan of The Mockers introduced the group to Malcolm Smith (from the electronic dance-pop band The Fan Club) who gave them unsupervised access to his studio in Grey Lynn. Soon after, the band caught the attention of Nick Morgan, who offered to manage the group, and arranged for them to work from Revolver Studios in Royal Oak. Following a gig in the mid-90s as a supporting act for Hunters & Collectors, representatives for Flying Nun came backstage to sign the band.

At the request of Flying Nun Records' parent company Mushroom Records, the band changed its name to Bressa Creeting Cake, believing the original name was unmarketable. McWilliams, Maddock and Wilton each took on a part of that name as their own stage name; Maddock adopted the alias Geoff Creeting. By this time, Neilsen had left the band, and the group proceeded as a trio, recording their first self-titled EP and album in 1996. The album was launched with a party at Alexandra Park Raceway, and the group went on to create several music videos, including one for "Palm Singing" featuring Jonathan Brugh. The band also toured in support of The Mutton Birds, but rarely played live shows by the late 90s.

By 1999, McWilliams and Maddock had parted ways due to diverging creative interests, bringing an effective end to Bressa Creeting Cake.

=== 1999–2007: Goldenhorse ===
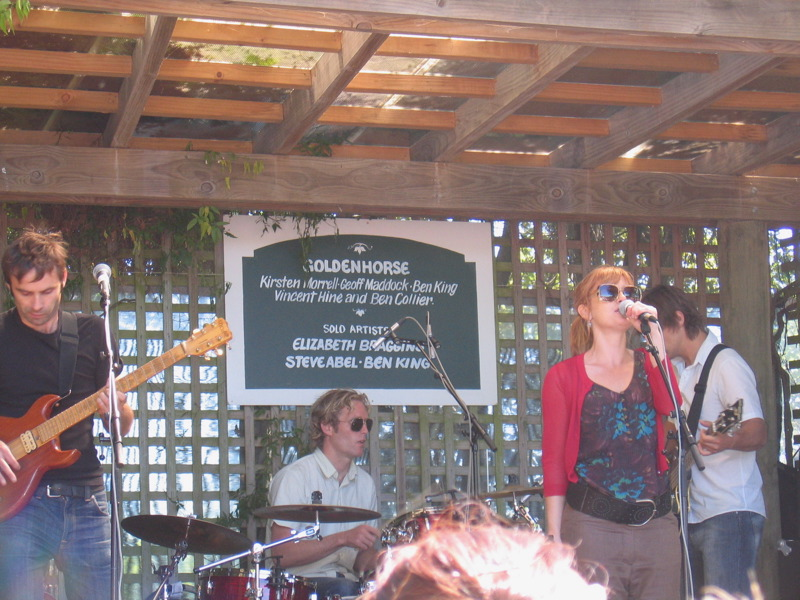
Maddock (left) performing with Goldenhorse in 2005

In 1999, Maddock formed Goldenhorse with Kirsten Morrell. The pair were seeking to form a band to play at a wedding; Ben King was brought in as a founding member, as was Wilton from Bressa Creeting Cake. The group had a limited budget, mostly from funding provided by Morrell's mother, and used its local connections to acquire equipment loaned from Tim Finn and Neil Finn.

In 2002, Goldenhorse released Riverhead to commercial success, going 3× platinum and topping the New Zealand charts in 2004. It was recorded on-and-off over a year, with most of the recording in a home studio in the Waitakere Ranges. The success of the album subsequently lead to a record deal with Siren Records. The hit single "Maybe Tomorrow" was awarded an APRA Silver Scroll Award for Most Performed New Zealand Work after becoming the most played song on New Zealand radio in 2003.

In 2004, Maddock wrote the arrangements for two special orchestral performances involving Goldenhorse. The first took place on 31 July at Aotea Centre with the Auckland Philharmonic Orchestra. The second was on 6 August at Christchurch Town Hall with the Christchurch Symphony Orchestra.

In 2005, the band followed up with Out of the Moon. They brought on veteran producer Murray Grindlay, and also introduced guitarist Andrew Clark, Ben Collier and Vincent Hine into the mix. The album peaked at number 2 on the charts and went platinum. The band promptly began touring, including overseas in London. Maddock was nominated for an APRA Silver Scroll Award for his writing on the single of the album's namesake, "Out of the Moon".

In 2007 following a tour, the band started working on their third album, Reporter. It was recorded at Roundhead Studios with sound engineer Clint Murphy and producer Phil Vinall, the latter known for working with Radiohead and Placebo among other big acts. In addition, Nick Gaffaney joined the band to provide drums. The album had a lukewarm commercial reception, spending one week at 38 on the top 40 charts. Goldenhorse subsequently went on an indefinite hiatus, considered to be an effective break-up. However, Maddock was nominated again for an APRA Silver Scroll Award for his writing on the single "Say My Name". Around this period, Maddock moved to London and attempted to start a new band named Jesus Said Kill; the group recorded, but did not tour, and was quickly disbanded, with Maddock citing the busyness and logistical complexity of London as the main causes.

=== 2008–2013: Production and session work ===
Following the end of Goldenhorse, Maddock continued work as a producer and session musician, and began composing. Maddock wrote the soundtrack for Katie Wolfe's 2008 short-film This Is Her, and the music for Michael Galvin's 2009 play "Station to Station", which was well-received.

In 2009, Maddock worked with Morrell on her debut solo album, Ultraviolet (2010) providing instrumentals and assisting with the recording. Around this period, Maddock and King also worked with Daniel Beddingfield, along with Jol Mulholland who had produced Ultraviolet. In the early 2010s, Maddock was credited numerous projects for his guitar work, including on More Fun (2011) by Panther and the Zoo, and working with Flip Grater on "The Sheriff" for Greg Johnson's Exits (2012).

In 2013, Maddock contributed to the debut album of Debbie and the Downers. That same year, he joined The Wedding Present as a contributor and performer, supporting the New Zealand leg of their tour.

=== 2014–2023: Santa Barbara and Young Winona ===
In 2014, Maddock and Gaffaney permanently relocated to Los Angeles to pursue new career opportunities. The pair formed a new band, Santa Barbara, with Gaffaney's wife, Cass. The group was described as alternative "60’s influenced pop/rock". The following year, the trio became Young Winona, with Cass as the lead vocalist.

In 2017, Flying Nun reissued Bressa Creeting Cake's debut EP with additional material. Meanwhile, Maddock continued with Young Winona, releasing "Reptile Lover / Girl in Black" in 2019 in collaboration with poet Jeffrey Holgate. During this time, Maddock also worked as a producer for other acts, including on OpenHearts (2019) by Tommy and The Fallen Horses.

In 2020, Young Winona signed a record deal with Poor Man Records. The band had planned to release an EP, but delayed it to 2021 due to the COVID-19 pandemic. In 2021 and 2022, the band released several singles including "LA Waste", "Killer Daisies, "Confess", "Sadistic" and "Red Dress".

On 18 March 2023, Young Winona played their last show before going on an indefinite hiatus, after Nick and Cass Gaffaney announced they were relocating to Las Vegas.

=== 2024–present: Production and collaborations ===
Maddock was working as a producer in the mid-2020s. He collaborated with Morrell on her second album, Morrellium, released in 2026.

== See also ==
- Geoff Maddock on Discogs
