= Cairo Knife Fight =

New Zealand rock band

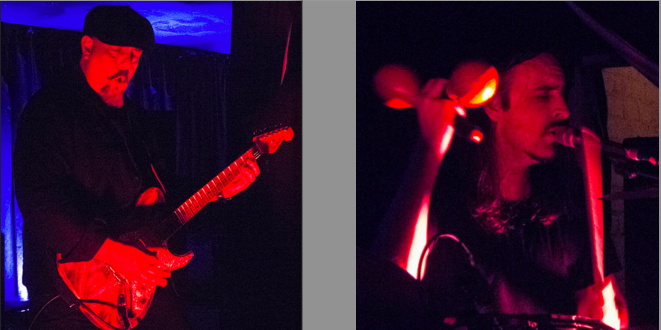
- Cairo Knife Fight, Auckland, 2015.

Background information
- Also known as: CKF
- Origin: Christchurch, New Zealand
- Genres: Alternative rock; industrial rock; hard rock
- Years active: 2009–present
- Label: Warner Music Group
- Members: Nick Gaffaney; George Pajon
- Past members: Aaron Tokona
- Website: cairoknifefight.com

Cairo Knife Fight (CKF) is a rock band originating from New Zealand, founded in 2007 by musical artist Nick Gaffaney, featuring a drum and guitar duo incorporating real-time layered loops.

== History ==
Cairo Knife Fight (CKF) began as Nick Gaffaney's unnamed side project along with several other band members in 2004, namely Aaron Tokona (guitar and vocals), Ritchie Pickard (bass), Roslen Langton (vocals), Katie Tayor (vocals), and Nick (drums and vocals). Nick was a successful professional session and recording artist with several popular New Zealand musical groups when deciding to pursue an original project.

In 2009, the initial multi-member line-up was narrowed down to a duo composed of electric guitar and drums, with Nick playing drums with his right hand, using a keyboard bass with his left hand and utilising a loop station to make live vocal and rhythm loops, the guitar parts by Aaron Tokona also being looped and layered live.

CKF is listed as a notable band at Kiwi Rock (bands of New Zealand).

The duo gained notoriety when playing the Opera House in Wellington opening for UK act Gomez in late 2009. This performance brought the attention of Them Crooked Vultures, who invited CKF to open for their New Zealand tour in early 2010. CKF release their self-titled EP in July of that year, the first single entitled 'This is Love' being included on the NZ Radio Hit Disk for mid 2010, and being rated as one of the songs of the year. The EP went on to be nominated in the 'Best Rock Album' category at the New Zealand Music Awards in 2011. Later in 2010 a trip to New York City brought the attention of CMJ festival team members, and were invited to play a CMJ bill at the Bowery Electric with a tour of Australia being realised .

2011 began with a New Zealand tour with Kiwi rock hall of famers Shihad in January. Them Crooked Vultures front man Josh Homme again requested CKF to open for his Queens of the Stone Age New Zealand tour in February.

In early 2011 a deadly earthquake occurred at Christchurch, NZ, Cairo Knife Fight's hometown. Absorbing the horrendous aftermath, the band took solace in recording the follow-up EP 'II', released in August 2011 to 5 star reviews and a top 40 chart placing. The band was then to appear as special guests of the Foo Fighters for an earthquake benefit concert in Auckland, NZ, ending the year by again joining the Foo Fighters onstage at Western Springs Stadium in Auckland, New Zealand in front of 45,000 people for the band's Wasting Light tour, considered one of New Zealand's biggest ever stand-alone shows.

In 2012 Cairo Knife Fight returned to the United States to perform at SXSW, being labelled as 'Bands to Watch in 2012' by Alt Press and made several 'Best of SXSW' lists at the Texas festival. After SXSW, the band returned to New Zealand to work on and record their debut full-length record "The Colossus", released by Warner Music in May 2015, produced by Justyn Pilbrow (The Neighbourhood and King 810).

In October 2013, Cairo Knife Fight featured on the soundtrack for the surf documentary Waverider by Gareth Davies and RedYeti Films, directed by Karl Lear, winner of Best Picture (2013) in New Zealand and Best Picture (2014) in Hawaii.

Guitarist Aaron Tokona left the band in 2014 and George Pajon joined the band in early 2015 after initially meeting Nick in New Zealand years earlier through engineer and record producer Neil Baldock.

After releasing their debut record The Colossus, the band relocated to Los Angeles in 2015 and performed tours of New Zealand and Australia opening for Shihad, and once again returning to perform at SXSW in Austin, Texas. That summer CKF toured Australia in support of The Colossus and opened for the Australian band Karnivool, with a subsequent tour of NZ further supporting their debut release.

CKF has toured and opened festivals for Queens of the Stone Age, Them Crooked Vultures, Foo Fighters, Karnivool, Shihad and several other international acts.

In 2015, The Colossus was nominated for a New Zealand Music Award for Best Rock Album, and in 2016, the album was nominated for the Taite Music Prize.

== Band members ==
=== Current ===
- Nick Gaffaney – vocals, drums, synthesizer (2007–present)
- George Pajon – lead guitar, rhythm guitar (2015–present)

=== Nick Gaffaney ===
Nick Gaffaney currently plays in Los Angeles rock power trio Santa Barabara, and previously played drums with Dimmer, Goldenhorse, Hollie Smith and has recorded and performed with songwriters such as Anika Moa, Jan Hellriegel, Leila Adu and Godfrey de Grut; Hip Hop/Roots artists Scribe, Fat Freddy's Drop, Solaa, King Kapisi, Nuvonesia, and Sangha; Jazz musicians Mark de Clive-Lowe, Joel Haines, The New Loungehead and Jeff Henderson; and has worked on film soundtracks for The Truth about Demons and Fracture with composer Victoria Kelly.

Nick won the 2013 APRA Professional Development Award.

=== George Pajon ===
George Pajon recorded and toured with The Black Eyed Peas for 17 years, is a songwriter, producer and session recording musician, and has writing and recording credits with Fergie, Carlos Santana, Sting, Ricky Martin, will.i.am, Macy Gray, Candy Dulfer, Los Lonely Boys, Cheryl Cole, "Weird Al" Yankovic, Kelis, Richard Cheese, Nas, Damian Marley, Sérgio Mendes, J.Period, John Legend, Jully Black, Venus Brown, M. Pokora, Klaus Badelt, Kidz Bop Kids, Kim Dotcom, Tre Hardson and various other artists.

George has won several Grammy Awards for songwriting and music performance.

George Pajon joined Cairo Knife Fight in early 2015,

=== Former ===
- Aaron Tokona – guitar, vocals (2007–2014)
- Ritchie Pickard – bass guitar (2007–2009)
- Roslen Langton – vocals (2007–2009)
- Katie Tayor – vocals (2007–2009)

Aaron Tokona was known for bands Weta, The Superjesus and Fly My Pretties among other music groups.

== Discography ==
=== Iron ===
"Iron" – EP (20 July 2009), mastered by Greg Calbi, Mixed by Neil Baldock (tracks 1–6, 8–10) and Steve Fowler (track 7), recorded by Neil Baldock and Steve Fowler (4), written by Nick Gaffaney, Loretta Recordings, distributed, licensed and manufactured by Sony Music Entertainment New Zealand – 88697520542.

All lyrics are written by Nick Gaffaney.

No.	Title	Length
1.	"Iron"	4:19
2.	"Better"	5:43
3.	"Come Home to Me"	3:22
4.	"Run"	4:55
5.	"Time"	2:22
6.	"Hard Love"	4:44
7.	"Push"	6:12
8.	"Moving"	3:38
9.	"Justified"	4:12
10.	"Woman"	6:30

=== Cairo Knife Fight ===
"Cairo Knife Fight" – EP (15 August 2011), the self-titled debut, written and produced by Nick Gaffaney and Aaron Tokona, recorded and mixed over a period of two years at Roundhead and Clevetown Studios in Auckland and Christchurch by Neil Baldock, recorded by Steve Fowler, released through Liberation Music.

No.	Title	Length
1.	"The Violence of Action"	8:32
2.	"The Origin of Slaves"	3:41
3.	"The Opiate of the Living"	7:11
4.	"The Secrets of Sin"	4:36

=== Cairo Knife Fight II ===
"Cairo Knife Fight II" – EP (3 October 2011), Liberation Music.

No.	Title	Length
1.	"Big Face"	6:51
2.	"This Is Love"	5:19
3.	"All I Ever Wanted"	7:34
4.	"The Happy Couple"	6:12

=== The Isolator ===
"The Isolator" – EP (30 January 2015), was written and recorded in three different countries with musicians Aaron Tokona, Joel Haines, Laughton Kora, William Knapp, Alexander Edward Winter and Samuel K, with session recordings in Melbourne, Auckland, recorded and mixed in New York City by producer Justyn Pilbrow (The Neighbourhood, King 810) and Samuel K, produced through Loretta Recordings Limited under exclusive license to Warner Music New Zealand Limited.

No.	Title	Length
1.	"Rezlord"	4:28
2.	"No Longer Silent"	4:01
3.	"Cleaver"	3:55
4.	"The Isolator"	3:24
5.	"So Much More To Give"	4:03

=== The Colossus ===
"The Colossus" – LP (29 May 2015), includes collaborations with musicians Aaron Tokona, Joel Haines, Laughton Kora and William Knapp, Mark Lanegan (Screaming Trees, Queens of the Stone Age) and Tyler Fournames (Marilyn Manson) and John Anderson (Banks), released through Loretta Recordings under exclusive license to Warner Music New Zealand Limited.

No.	Title	Length
1.	"The Colossus"	5:00
2.	"Rezlord"	4:28
3.	"No Longer Silent"	4:01
4.	"All in the Game"	3:04
5.	"Battle Damage"	5:25
6.	"Shadows of Sorrow"	5:24
7.	"Climbing Through Ashes"	4:28
8.	"Degrader"	3:11
9.	"Reality Engine"	3:47
10.	"Die Young"	4:29

=== Seven ===
"Seven" – LP (20 October 2017)

No.	Title	Length
1.	"(1)"	1:31
2.	"A-Nine"	4:06
3.	"(5)"	1:02
4.	"A-Six"	2:51
5.	"(7)"	0:50
6.	"A-Four"	2:56
7.	"(9)"	0:54
8.	"A-Seven"	3:17
9.	"(3)"	0:41
10.	"A-Two"	3:55
11.	"(11)"	0:20
12.	"A-Three"	4:39
13.	"(12)"	0:51
14.	"A-Eight"	3:50

=== Dream Season ===
"Dream Season" – EP (19 July 2024)

No.	Title	Length
1.	"AFTERBIAS"	4:17
2.	"Churn"	4:00
3.	"Nothing at All"	4:08
4.	"The Violence of Action"	8:29
5.	"You Want a Sign"	3:40
6.	"The Violence of Action (Live)"	7:13

=== Singles ===
Title	Year	Peak chart positions	Album
Title	Year	US Main.	Album
"Churn"	2023	37	TBA
