= Riverhead (album) =

Studio album by Goldenhorse
- Released: October 2002
- Studio: Quinns Road (Waiatarua); Seatrans House (Auckland); York Street (Auckland)
- Genre: Pop, folk
- Length: 46:39
- Label: Siren Records
- Producer: Geoff Maddock

Goldenhorse chronology
Riverhead (2002)	Out of the Moon (2005)

Alternative cover
- 2004 re-release

Singles from Riverhead
- 1. "Golden Dawn" Released: 2002; 2. "Maybe Tomorrow" Released: 7 February 2003; 3. "Wake Up Brother" Released: 4 September 2003; 4. "Northern Lights" Released: 2004

Riverhead is the debut studio album of New Zealand band Goldenhorse, released in October 2002. Three versions of this album were released: the original in 2002, a limited edition double-disc version in 2003, and re-release in 2004.

Riverhead spawned several singles including "Maybe Tomorrow" which was nominated for multiple awards, including as a finalist in the 2003 Australasian Performing Rights Association's Silver Scroll Awards and in the 2004 New Zealand Music Awards. The album was a sleeper hit, peaking at number 1 on New Zealand's RIANZ charts in 2004. It has sold over 49,000 copies, and was certified Platinum three times.

== Background and development ==
Riverhead was largely recorded at a home studio in the rural settlement of Waiatarua, located in the Waitākere Ranges, without a label and on a low budget Morrell received limited funding from her mother, and the group had used its local connections to loan equipment from Tim Finn and Neil Finn.

Band member and producer Geoff Maddock said in 2012 that the recording location, and its tendency to be "enveloped in mist", influenced the album's sound. Other influences included drummer Joel Wilton's desire to experiment with various metrical rhythms as well as Maddock's parents, whose interest in classical music inspired him to incorporate instruments such as the cello on the album.

The subsequent success of the album lead to Goldenhorse signing with Siren Records.

== Reception ==
Riverhead was a slow burner upon release, debuting at 43, and shifting around the music charts for some two years before finally peaking at number 1 in 2004. The single "Maybe Tomorrow" became the most played local song on New Zealand radio for 2002/2003. The album was a commercial success and went triple platinum.

=== Critical reception ===
Professional ratings
Review scores
Source	Rating
The New Zealand Herald	5/5 stars

Russell Baillie of The New Zealand Herald praised the album and gave it 5 stars, describing it as a "clever debut album" and "a summer pop classic in the making", comparing elements to Sugarcubes and Catatonia, but writing "they sound like a band who have worked way past their influences".

In a retrospective piece, The Spinoff ranked Riverhead among the "greatest New Zealand albums of all time". Nick Bollinger featured the album in his book, 100 Essential Albums, describing the album as "complex, intriguing, and original" and arguing that it produced hits which "remain embedded in the country's consciousness".

== Track listing ==
Track listing adapted from Spotify. All tracks are written by Goldenhorse.

No.	Title	Length
1.	"Northern Lights"	4:08
2.	"Spice Islands"	4:30
3.	"Golden Dawn"	4:41
4.	"Maybe Tomorrow"	2:56
5.	"Riverhead"	4:45
6.	"Wake Up Brother"	3:35
7.	"Shrinking Her Legs"	6:17
8.	"Out Tonight"	3:26
9.	"Baby's Been Bad"	2:53
10.	"American Wife"	3:33
11.	"Dark Forest"	5:41
Total length:		46:39

2003 bonus disc
No.	Title	Length
1.	"Wake Up Brother" (Radio Edit)
2.	"Abandoned Dam"
3.	"Maybe Tomorrow" (Helen Young Recording)
4.	"Baby's Been Bad" (Video)
5.	"Golden Dawn" (Video)
6.	"Maybe Tomorrow" (Video)

== Personnel ==
Credits adapted from CD liner notes.

Goldenhorse

- Andrew Clark – guitar
- Ben King – bass
- Geoff Maddock – guitar
- Kirsten Morrell – vocals
- Joel Wilton – drums

Additional musicians

- Miranda Adams – violin
- Dominic Blaazer – organ
- Julia Broom – viola
- Simeon Broom – violin
- Georgina Cooper – cello
- Julia Dibley – violin
- Kirk Havelock – clarinet
- Angela Hay – clarinet
- Rebecca Hendl – cello
- Kingsley Melhuish – trumpet
- Catherine Petoe – viola
- Warwick Robinson – clarinet
- Simone Ruggen – violin
- Duncan Taylor – trombone
- Isaac Tucker – percussion

Technical & design

- Geoff Maddock – production
- Nick Abbott – mixing, recording
- Damian Alexander – album cover design
- Martyn Alexander – mastering
- Mark Smith – additional photography
- Andrew B. White – design assembly

== Charts ==
=== Weekly charts ===
Chart (2004)	Peak position
New Zealand Albums (RMNZ)	1

=== Year-end charts ===
Chart (2003)	Position
New Zealand (Recorded Music NZ)	33

Chart (2004)	Position
New Zealand (Recorded Music NZ)	9
