= Wake Up Brother =

Single by Goldenhorse

from the album Riverhead
- Released: 4 September 2003
- Recorded: 2003
- Genre: Pop, folk
- Label: EMI
- Songwriter(s): Geoff Maddock, K Reade

Goldenhorse singles chronology
"Maybe Tomorrow" (2003)	"Wake Up Brother" (2003)	"Northern Lights" (2004)

"Wake Up Brother" is a single released by New Zealand band Goldenhorse. It appeared on their album, Riverhead, and was released in 2003.

The music video for "Wake Up Brother" features the 2003 radio edit of the song. Kirsten Morrell is the only band member featured in the video.

The song was also used by TV3 [NZ] as the main theme of their old show Sunrise.

== Music charts ==
The song remained on the New Zealand Top 40 for nine weeks, peaking at number 17.

== Track listing ==
1. "Wake Up Brother"
2. "Northern Lights" (Waiatarua Mix)
3. "Wake Up Brother" Video
