= George Pajon =

American guitarist, songwriter and record producer (born 1969)

George Pajon Jr.
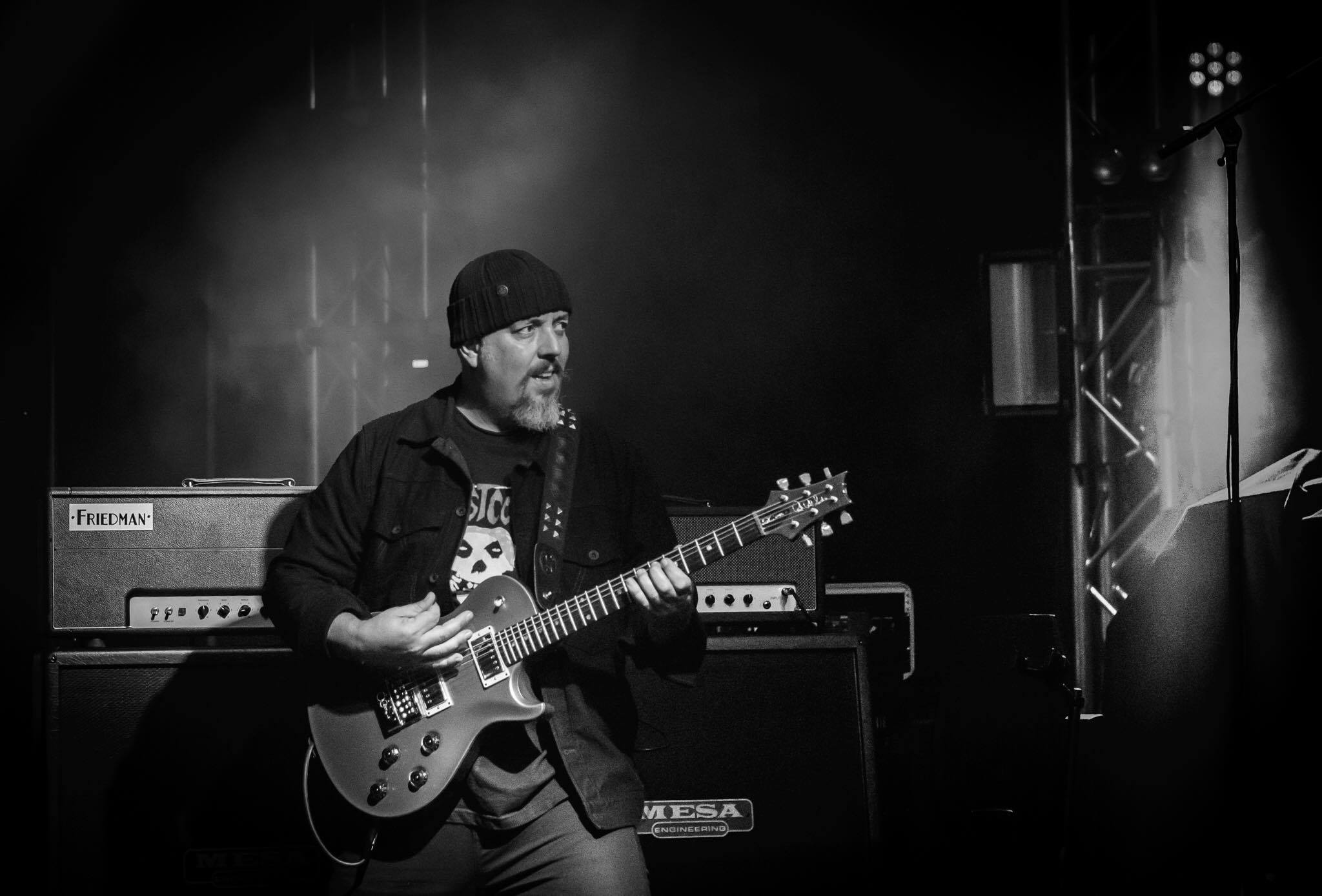
- Pajon in 2016

Background information
- Born: George Pajon Jr. April 10, 1969 (age 57); Los Angeles, California, United States
- Genres: Blues; jazz; hip hop; rock
- Occupations: Musician; songwriter; composer; record producer
- Instruments: Guitar; sitar
- Years active: 1986–present
- Member of: Cairo Knife Fight; The Black Eyed Peas

George Pajon Jr. (born April 10, 1969) is an American guitarist, songwriter and record producer.

== Early life ==
George Pajon Jr. "attended private St. Matthias Elementary School, a Catholic K-8 school, in Huntington Park. Growing up in conservative Downey, Pajon was 9 when he picked up his first guitar. He played his second concert in the school's cafeteria. He worked hard to collect enough credits so that by his senior year he only needed to attend half a day's worth of classes, leaving more time for his guitar. Pajon graduated from Downey High School in 1987."

== Career ==
George was one of the Black Eyed Peas' key performing and recording musicians, having written, produced, and co-written many of the group's most popular songs.

He has recording credits as a songwriter, producer or musician with Fergie, Carlos Santana, Sting, Ricky Martin, will.i.am, Macy Gray, Candy Dulfer, Los Lonely Boys, Cheryl Cole, "Weird Al" Yankovic, Kelis, Richard Cheese, Nas, Damian Marley, Sérgio Mendes, J.Period, John Legend, Jully Black, Venus Brown, M. Pokora, Klaus Badelt, Kidz Bop Kids, Kim Dotcom, Tre Hardson and various other artists.

Pajon has contributed to movie soundtracks such as The Best Man Holiday, Poseidon, Scary Movie, Made, Barbershop 2: Back in Business, Dirty Dancing: Havana Nights, Our Family Wedding, Knight and Day and Harold & Kumar Go to White Castle among others in either a songwriter, record producer or musician role. Pajon has contributed to television soundtracks such as Live from Studio Five, The Voice of the Philippines, The Voice UK, The X Factor and Dancing with the Stars among others. He co-wrote the theme and title credit to Samurai Jack, the animated cartoon series.

In 2012, it was reported that Pajon had sued Sean Larkin, the Black Eyed Peas' former manager, for breach of contract regarding Larkin's failure to appropriate income taxes.

In 2015, Pajon joined Nick Gaffaney's duo act Cairo Knife Fight.

== Personal life ==
In 2009, The Downey Patriot writes: "We asked George Pajon Jr. to provide tips for aspiring musicians. His advice: 'There are 20,000 guitar players in Downey alone. What makes you special from the guy next to you? Passion, determination is what sets you aside. Set goals, never go backwards. When you do, stop yourself and reevaluate. I frustrated the hell out of every band I was in. I wasn't going to flounder. Becoming content is the enemy of musicians. You'll never find your true voice if you don't challenge yourself'."

In 2009, the wedding of George Pajon and Naomi Medina took place in Mexico's Xcaret and was televised on WE Tv's Platinum Weddings.

In 2012, The San Jose Mercury News finds Pajon making time for the John Lennon Educational Tour Bus: "Black Eyed Peas guitarist George Pajon Jr. also volunteered his services, flying up from L.A. to work with Solomon and the other young musicians, who seemed a bit awestruck from being able to work with a huge star like Pajon." Pajon said he, in turn, was blown away by the collaboration with young talented musicians. "Overwhelming," he said. "So much musical knowledge, at such a young age. It's really inspiring to me. We've been involved with the bus guys since 1999, and they've been really inspiring to us over the years," Pajon said. "This was a welcome break for me. I could use a dose of inspiration, and it's been absolutely great to see young creative minds at work here."

== Discography ==
=== Solo releases ===
In January 2004, Pajon released his first solo effort entitled Fried Plantains on Kulafa Recordings. "The new debut release by guitarist George Pajon Jr., “Fried Plaintains,” deserves a key spot among the great grooves on the funk-jazz shelf." "George’s musical dexterity comes through more than ever in his current solo project, Fried Plantains, which fuses the worlds of jazz, hip-hop, blues and rock."

In 2007 Pajon released the album entitled The Band Behind the Front with Bucky Jonson on the BBE label.

In 2012 Pajon teamed up with The Voice's season 3 contestant Diego Val to release Sons of Mariel.

In 2012, The Houston Press wrote "Original composer George Pajon Jr. - "Si Se Puede," the Spanish version of "Yes We Can," - the unstoppable hit inspired by President-elect Barack Obama's eponymous 2007 speech."

== Awards ==
=== Emmy Award ===
Pajon co-wrote the Emmy Award-winning 2008 Barack Obama campaign song "Yes We Can".

=== Grammy Awards ===
Pajon co-wrote the #1 hit song "Where Is The Love?" which received two Grammy nominations; Record of the Year and Best Rap/Sung Collaboration at the 46th Grammy Awards.

Pajon won the Best Rap Performance By A Duo Or Group Grammy for co-writing the song "Let's Get It Started" at the 47th Grammy Awards.

Pajon won the Best Rap Performance By A Duo Or Group Grammy for co-writing the song "Don't Phunk with My Heart" at the 48th Grammy Awards.

Pajon won the Best Pop Vocal Album Grammy at the 52nd Grammy Awards for co-writing the songs "Out Of My Head", "Now Generation", "Rockin to the Beat" and "Back at 45", from the album The E.N.D.

=== BMI Awards ===
Pajon won two 2006 BMI Pop Music Awards for co-writing the songs "Don't Phunk With My Heart" and "Let's Get It Started".

Pajon won a 2006 BMI London Pop Music Award for co-writing the song "Don't Phunk With My Heart."

Pajon won a 2005 BMI Pop Music Award for co-writing the song "Where Is The Love."

== Endorsements ==
- D'Addario Strings.
- Grosh Guitars.
- Guyatone Pedals.
- Mesa Boogie.
- Yamaha Guitars.
