= Ultraviolet (Kirsten Morrell album) =

Studio album by Kirsten Morrell
- Released: 10 May 2010
- Recorded: 2009
- Studios: The Lab (Auckland); London Lounge Cobblers Lane
- Genre: Pop
- Length: 39:16
- Labels: KMR Records, Warner Music New Zealand
- Producer: Jol Mulholland

Kirsten Morrell chronology
Ultraviolet (2010)	Morrellium (2026)

Singles from Ultraviolet
- 1. "Cherry Coloured Dreams" Released: 7 September 2009

Ultraviolet is the debut solo album by New Zealand singer-songwriter Kirsten Morrell, released in 2010. It was Morrell's first commercial release since the hiatus of Goldenhorse.

Morrell returned to working with producer Jol Mulholland, who had previously worked with Goldenhorse on their 2007 album, Reporter. Other contributors to the album include Goldenhorse collaborator Geoff Maddock, and singer Daniel Bedingfield providing backing vocals.

The album spent two weeks on the top 40 charts, peaking at 25, and was met with mixed reviews.

== Background ==
In 2007, Morrell was touring in Europe with Goldenhorse, and the band was preparing for the release of their third album, Reporter. The album was released in October to lacklustre commercial performance, briefly reaching 38 in the top 40 charts. The band went on an indefinite hiatus, prompting Morrell to explore a solo career.

Morrell phoned Maddock, a former bandmate who she had also been in a relationship with at one time. They arranged to work together on her solo debut. The album was partly recorded in London and Auckland, including during a two week period in the house of Morrell's brother.

Morrell described the album as "summery" and says it was inspired by her time traveling with Goldenhorse during tours.

To help with production costs, the album received an NZ$50,000 grant from NZ On Air in October 2009.

Upon release, Morrell toured in New Zealand and Europe as a solo artist, including at the Isle Of Wight Festival in June 2010, and at The Copper Room in Auckland as part of New Zealand Music Month.

== Critical reception ==
Ultraviolet received mixed reviews from critics. Shea O'Neill of Sideroom described the album as "shiny pop" that is "catchy" and "bubbly", writing "there’s nothing I don’t love about this album." Paula Yeoman of The New Zealand Herald also described the album positively leading up to its release, labeling it "a beautifully crafted collection of playful electro-pop". However, Simon Sweetman of Stuff panned the album, describing Morrell's performance that of "a second-rate Lily Allen", but singled out "Cherry Coloured Dreams" as a track they "didn't mind".

== Track listing ==
No.	Title	Length
1.	"Ghosts"	3:26
2.	"Friday Boy"	3:44
3.	"Silent Window"	3:25
4.	"Let Me Go"	2:59
5.	"I Fly Away"	3:01
6.	"Town of My Bones"	3:02
7.	"Cherry Coloured Dreams"	3:07
8.	"Better"	1:41
9.	"Cold Spoilt Girl"	3:21
10.	"Wandering Hands"	3:48
11.	"Marianne"	3:11
12.	"He Walked In"	4:26
Total length:		36:16

== Personnel ==
Credits adapted from CD liner notes.

- Kirsten Morrell – writing, vocals, guitar, keyboard, artwork
- Geoff Maddock – bass, drums, keyboards, backing vocals
- Jol Mulholland – producer, bass, guitar, drums, keyboard, string arrangement, backing vocals
- Daniel Bedingfield – backing vocals
- Joey Loney – additional bass
- Ashley Brown – cello
- Georgina Cervin – cello

== Charts ==
Chart (2010)	Peak position
New Zealand Albums (RMNZ)	25
