= Maybe Tomorrow (Goldenhorse song) =

Single by Goldenhorse

from the album Riverhead
- Released: 7 February 2003
- Recorded: 2003
- Genre: Pop
- Length: 3:01
- Label: EMI
- Songwriters: Geoff Maddock, K Reade
- Producer: Geoff Maddock

Goldenhorse singles chronology
"Golden Dawn" (2002)	"Maybe Tomorrow" (2003)	"Wake Up Brother" (2003)

"Maybe Tomorrow" is the second single released by New Zealand band Goldenhorse from their debut triple platinum selling number-one album, Riverhead. The song, written by Geoff Maddock, was released in 2003 and reached #10 on RIANZ single charts. The single stayed in the charts for 31 weeks, and became the #13 single of the year in New Zealand.

The song was nominated for several awards; it was a finalist in the 2003 Australasian Performing Rights Association's Silver Scroll Awards and a finalist in the 2004 New Zealand Music Awards. It was also the most played song on New Zealand radio for 2002/2003, and won the Airplay Record of the Year award at the New Zealand Music Awards and the Most Performed Work award at the 2003 APRA Silver Scroll Awards.

The song was performed by the band at Auckland Central Remand Prison to Ahmed Zaoui to celebrate his 44th birthday.

== Track listing ==
1. "Maybe Tomorrow"
2. "American Wife (Hollis Dance Mix)"
3. "Maybe Tomorrow" (Video)

== Charts ==
=== Year-end charts ===
Chart (2003)	Position
New Zealand (Recorded Music NZ)	13

== Certifications ==
Region	Certification	Certified units/sales
New Zealand (RMNZ)	Platinum	30,000^{‡}
^{‡} Sales+streaming figures based on certification alone.
