= Fromont (surname) =

Fromont is a surname. Notable people with the surname include:

- Cécile Fromont, French-born American art historian
- Jane Fromont, New Zealand and Australian scientist specialising in sponges
- Richard Fromont (born 1969), New Zealand rugby player
