= Avondale College =

New Zealand secondary school

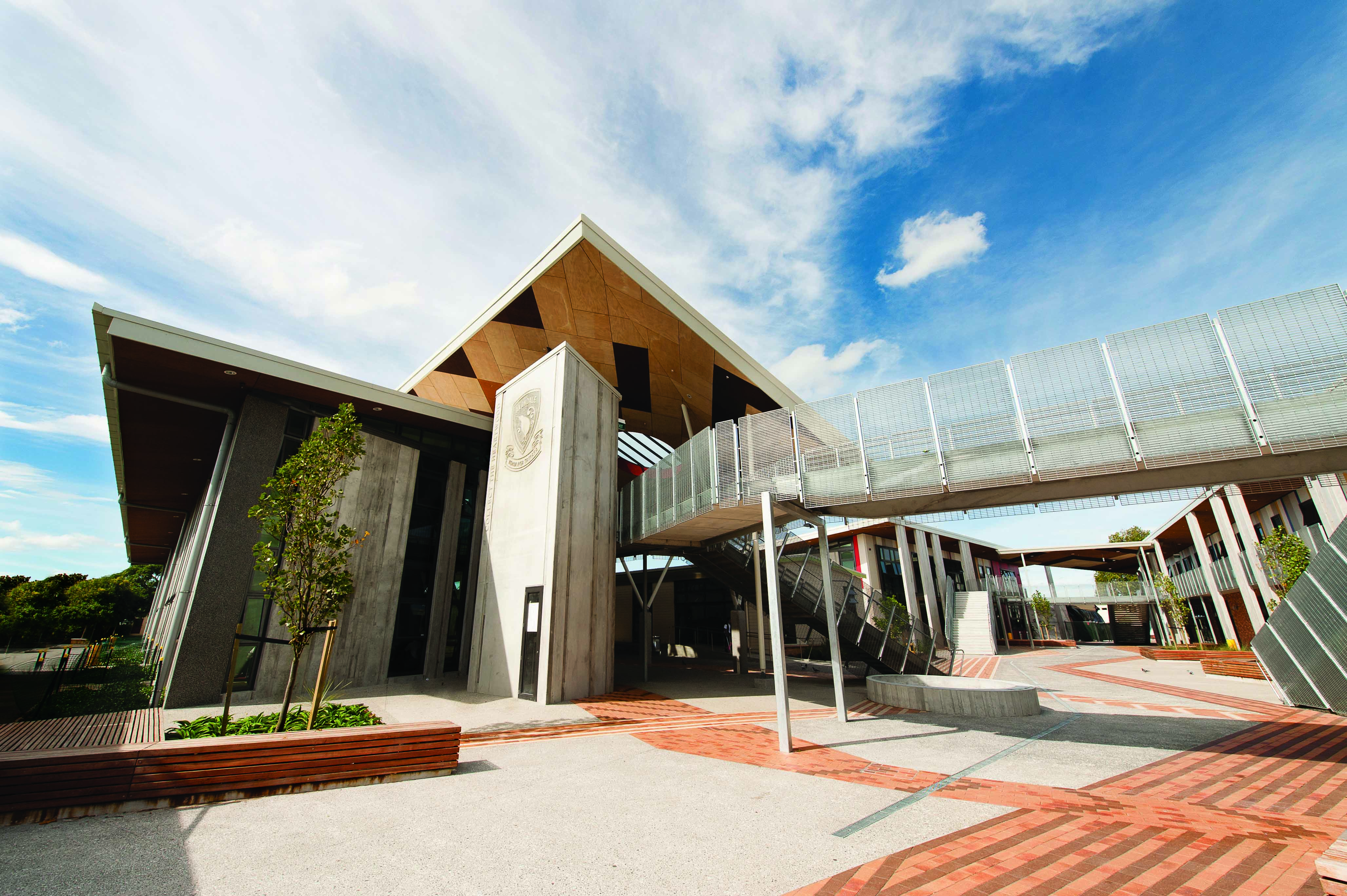

Location
- 59 Victor Street; Avondale; Auckland; New Zealand; 36.8907°S 174.6903°E

Information
- Funding type: State
- Motto: Kohia nga taikaka ("Seek the Heartwood")
- Established: 1945
- Ministry of Education Institution no.: 78
- Principal: Lyndy Watkinson
- Years offered: 9–13
- Gender: Coeducational
- Enrolment: 2,789 (July 2026)
- Colours: Black and white
- Socio-economic decile: 4J
- Website: www.avcol.school.nz

Avondale College is a state coeducational secondary school located in the central Auckland, New Zealand, suburb of Avondale. With a roll of 2,789 students from years 9–13 (ages 12–18), it is the third largest secondary school in New Zealand.

== Overview ==
The principal of Avondale College and head of the 180 teachers is Lyndy Watkinson. Watkinson became principal in 2020 after the retirement of Brent Lewis; Lewis became principal in 2001 after the death of Phil Raffills, taking over from acting principal and former deputy principal Warren Peat, who went on to become principal of Saint Kentigern College. Raffills oversaw the redevelopment of the school buildings after much of the site was destroyed in a fire in 1990. Avondale College students wear a black and white uniform with the school crest on it that has variations depending on year level and gender, which changed from an older black, white and grey one in 2004.

The school has adopted NCEA and CIE for assessments and examinations.

== History ==
=== Early history ===
The site and buildings of Avondale College started as the U.S. Naval Mobile Hospital No. 6, a hospital for the United States Navy. At that time, the United States was preparing for an extended World War II battle in the South Pacific, and Auckland was chosen as one of a few New Zealand cities for hospitals to tend the wounded army and naval personnel.

The facility was designed by Tibor Donner (then in the NZ Public Works Department) and built by Fletcher Construction. The Department of Education had some of the site planned for a new secondary school to cope with the overcrowding of Auckland secondary schools. The hospital was given first priority, but a small portion of the buildings were built in permanent materials so that the wards, the gymnasium, the hall and some other buildings could be converted into a school at the end of the war. The extent of the hospital was huge, taking up all of the present school site as well as the nearby Rosebank Park and fields.

The war in the Pacific did not reach the scale preparations had been made for, and the hospital was not used to care for war casualties. In February 1945 a single school committee was appointed to supervise the use of the hospital as a school, which was originally named "Avondale Technical High School". As New Zealand was still virtually operating under war conditions, supplies and orders for the school were delayed. When it opened, the school was the only high school to operate in West Auckland, until Henderson High School opened in 1953.

==== Gallery ====
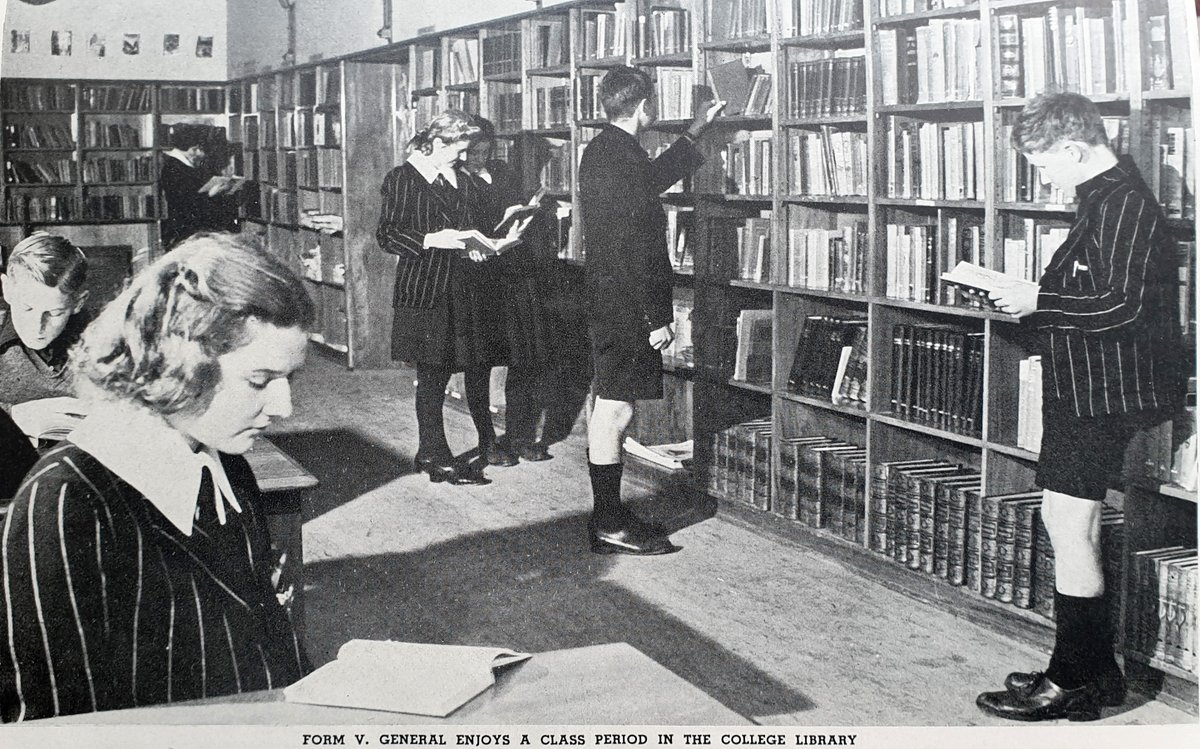
Students in the Avondale College library, 1948

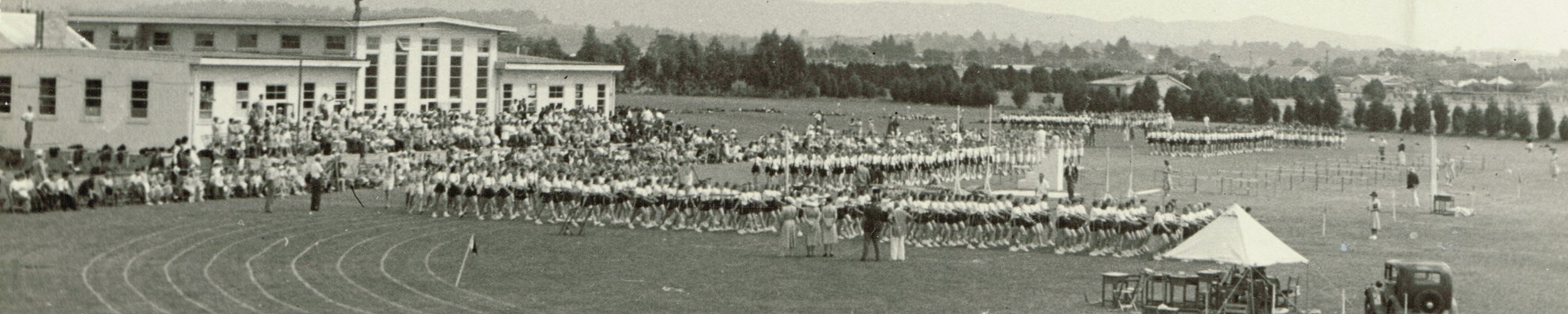
An overview of the opening day of the college's sports grounds in 1947

=== Recent history ===
Since 1945, the seven principals of Avondale College (L. E. Titheridge, A. R. Stephenson, W. R. Familton, A. H. Burton, P. R. Raffills, B. Lewis, and L. Watkinson) have extended and rebuilt the buildings, redeveloped the site and grounds, created an outdoor education camp (Taurewa) in Tongariro National Park, established exchange schools in Japan and Noumea, developed business relationships with the local community, and installed advanced technologies for students and staff.

On the evening of 10 April 1990, a major fire at the school destroyed the administration block, assembly hall, gymnasium, and thirteen classrooms. At its peak, 200 firefighters and 26 fire appliances fought the blaze. The cost of the damage was estimated at $5,000,000 (equivalent to $11,430,000 in 2026).

=== Notable events ===
The school has been used as a location in several films and television commercials. These include the 1979 comedy-drama Middle Age Spread, 1981 horror film Dead Kids, 1995 feature film Bonjour Timothy (a joint New Zealand–Canadian production), Disney Channel movie Eddie's Million Dollar Cook-Off, and the Te Mana Advertisement.

The school swimming pool, used in an advertisement for Lemon & Paeroa in 2006.

The school was closed for the day on 24 October 2006, after a fatal stabbing outside its gates on Sunday evening 22 October 2006. Fourteen-year-old Manaola Kaume'afaiva died after being stabbed in the chest. Manaola, a student at the college, was attending a church event.

In March 2009, a 17-year-old male exchange student stabbed a teacher in the back while he was teaching a Japanese class. The student was subsequently sentenced to 18 months in prison and ordered to pay $10,000 in reparation.

On 18 August 2021, Avondale College was identified as a location of interest by health authorities following a community outbreak of the SARS-CoV-2 Delta variant during the COVID-19 pandemic in New Zealand.

== Buildings ==
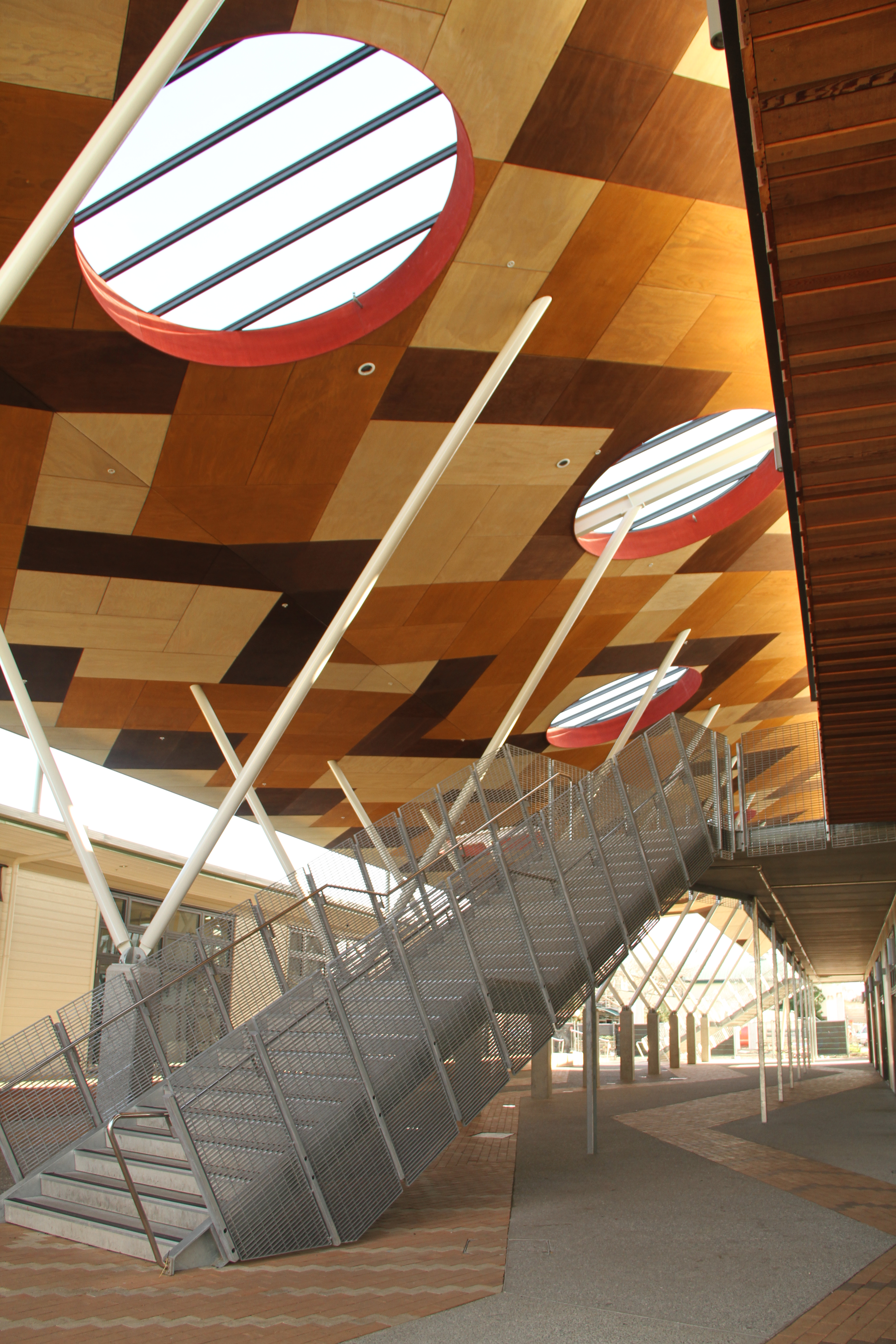
D-block, part of the first phase of Avondale College's rebuilding project

On 9 June 2006, the New Zealand Prime Minister Helen Clark visited Avondale College to open the new technical subjects building, the Ferguson Building, that had already been in use through the second half of 2005. It is named after the head of the Chemical and Materials Engineering department at the University of Auckland, Professor George Ferguson, who for many years served the college on the board of trustees.

The school underwent renovations in 2010–11 which included the building of new science, social science, health, and dance facilities.

Former Prime Minister John Key opened the new mathematics and physics buildings, the C- and D-blocks, on 10 August 2011, which was then the biggest school rebuild project in New Zealand history.

In March 2014, a new atrium, two new two-story buildings, and new sporting courts were built.

== Enrolment ==
At the October 2014 Education Review Office (ERO) review of the school, Avondale College had 2484 students, including 140 international students. 52% of students were male and 48% were female. The school is highly multicultural, with at least eleven identifiable ethnic groups – at the ERO review, 21% of students identified as New Zealand European (Pākehā), 15% as Samoan, 12% as Māori, 11% as Indian, 7% as Chinese, 5% as South East Asian, 4% each as African and Tongan, 3% each as Cook Islands Māori and Niuean, 2% each as Fijian and Middle Eastern, and 11% as another ethnicity.

As of July 2026, Avondale College has a roll of 2,789 students, of which 318 (11.4%) identify as Māori.

As of 2026, the school has an Equity Index of 439, placing it amongst schools whose students have below average socioeconomic barriers to achievement (roughly equivalent to deciles 6 and 7 under the former socio-economic decile system).

== Notable alumni and staff ==
- Claire Achmad, New Zealand Chief Children's Commissioner
- B. J. Anthony – New Zealand basketball player
- John Banks – politician, former MP and Mayor of Auckland (also attended Heretaunga College)
- Adrian Clarke – All Black rugby player (1958–60)
- Emily Drumm – New Zealand cricketer, former captain of the New Zealand women's national cricket team
- Cameron Duncan – film maker
- Richard Fromont – All Black rugby player (1993–95)
- Hollie Fullbrook - singer/songwriter
- Maurice Gee – author
- Campbell Grayson – New Zealand squash player
- Martin Guptill – cricketer, member of New Zealand national cricket team (2009–present)
- Sir Murray Halberg – middle-distance runner, Olympic gold medallist. The Halberg Awards are named in his honour.
- Leon Henry – New Zealand basketball player
- Debra Jackson – Nurse academic and editor
- Reuben Jelleyman – composer
- Geoff Maddock – musician and producer of Goldenhorse and Bressa Creeting Cake
- Selina Tusitala Marsh - New Zealand Poet Laureate (2017-2019)
- Rose McIver – actress
- Francis Meli – New Zealand rugby league player
- Grace Nweke – New Zealand netball player and Silver Fern
- Ajaz Patel – New Zealand cricketer, member of New Zealand national cricket team (2018–present)
- Jeet Raval – New Zealand cricketer, member of New Zealand national cricket team (2016–present)
- Bill Robinson – scientist
- Maurice Shadbolt – author
- Jamie Smith – hockey player, former captain of the New Zealand men's national field hockey team. Is now a Senior Manager at Avondale College.
- Lindsay Tait – New Zealand basketball player
