= Sweet Surrender =

Sweet Surrender may refer to:

== Songs ==
- Sweet Surrender (John Denver song), 1974
- Sweet Surrender (Sarah McLachlan song), 1997
- Sweet Surrender (Wet Wet Wet song), 1989
- Sweet Surrender (David Gates song), by Bread
- Sweet Surrender, by Brenda K. Starr from the soundtrack for the film License to Drive
- Sweet Surrender, by Diana Ross from Why Do Fools Fall in Love
1. Sweet Surrender, by Rico Butler. From Rhythmcity Records
- Sweet Surrender, by Harry Nilsson from Knnillssonn
- Sweet Surrender, by Jaci Velasquez from Jaci Velasquez
- Sweet Surrender, by Richard and Linda Thompson from First Light
- Sweet Surrender, by Rod Stewart from Body Wishes
- Sweet Surrender, by Sarah Blasko from Prelusive
- Sweet Surrender, by Tim Buckley from Greetings from L.A.
- Sweet Surrender, by Weta from Geographica

== Other ==
- Sweet Surrender, a 1979 album by Anita Ward
- Sweet Surrender (TV series), a 1987 sitcom featuring David Doyle
- Sweet Surrender (film), a 1935 American musical film
- Sweet Surrender (Grey's Anatomy), an episode of Grey's Anatomy
