= Out of the Moon (song) =

Single by Goldenhorse

from the album Out of the Moon
- Released: 2005
- Genre: Pop rock
- Length: 3:48
- Label: Siren Records
- Songwriter(s): Kirsten Morrell, Geoff Maddock

Goldenhorse singles chronology
"Run Run Run" (2004)	"Out of the Moon" (2005)	"Don't Wake Me Up" (2005)

"Out of the Moon" is a single released by New Zealand band Goldenhorse, taken from their 2005 sophomore album of the same name. The single entered the charts on 6 June 2005, and remained for 12 weeks, peaking at 21.

"Out of the Moon" was one of three singles released from Out of the Moon to receive a music video and frequent radio play. The album was a success for the band, debuting at number 2 on the charts in April 2005, and later going platinum.

In 2005, Maddock was nominated for an APRA Silver Scroll Award for his songwriting on the single.

== Music video ==
The music video for "Out of the Moon" was funded by NZ On Air and directed by Adam Jones, who had also directed the video for "Run Run Run", another single taken from Out of the Moon. The video is stylised to look like set pieces from a play, depicting Kirsten Morrell singing in a cabin, while band members hoist a wooden moon into the sky using a rope and a tree.

== Charts ==
=== NZ Singles Chart ===
Chart (2005)	Position
New Zealand (Recorded Music NZ)	21
