= Morrellium =

2026 album by Kirsten Morrell

Studio album by Kirsten Morrell
- Released: 24 July 2026
- Genre: Pop
- Length: 28:28
- Label: KMR
- Producers: Clint Murphy; Kirsten Morrell; Geoff Maddock

Kirsten Morrell chronology
Ultraviolet (2010)	Morrellium (2026)

Singles from Morrellium
- 1. "Strawberry Fool" Released: 15 September 2023; 2. "Harry" Released: 10 November 2023; 3. "Avignon" Released: 17 October 2024; 4. "Buddha (Forget You)" Released: 4 June 2025; 5. "Hoping & Wishing" Released: 21 November 2025

Morrellium is the second solo album of New Zealand singer-songwriter Kirsten Morrell, released on 24 July 2026. The album marked Morrell's return as a solo artist, following her debut album Ultraviolet released in 2010. It also includes contributions from Geoff Maddock and Ben King, members of her former band Goldenhorse, which has been on hiatus since 2007.

The album was originally slated for release in 2024, but was delayed multiple times. In September and November 2023, the singles "Strawberry Fool" and "Harry" were released, respectively. Morrell also performed two further songs from the album live; "Avignon", which was released in October 2024, and "Wishin' and a Hopin'" which later became "Hoping & Wishing (Robins' Song). In June 2025, the single "Buddha (Forget You)" was released in anticipation of the album's expected release by the end of 2025, before it was delayed again to 2026.

Morrellium was digitally released in July 2026 on Bandcamp and streaming platforms, and received positive reviews.

== Background and writing ==
Morrellium is Morrell's first studio recording project as a pop artist since releasing the single "I'm Free" for TVNZ 2 in 2011. In the years after she released her 2010 debut album Ultraviolet, Morrell moved to London and joined Crouch End Festival Chorus. She remained in the UK for much of the 2010s, periodically returning to New Zealand, including to reunite with Goldenhorse for a one-off performance in 2016.

Morrell felt "pent up creatively" following the hiatus of Goldenhorse. During the 2020 COVID-19 pandemic and subsequent lockdowns, Morrell began writing new solo material, encouraged after a friend told her she had "permission" to write. She began working with producer Clint Murphy, who has previously worked with New Zealand artist Kimbra. Recording took place in a studio in Hammersmith, London, and the album was further developed in Los Angeles by Geoff Maddock, Morrell's former partner and Goldenhorse band mate. Morrell then returned to New Zealand to finalise the album. Other collaborators on the album include former band mate Ben King of Goldenhorse performing the banjo on "Harry", and Alan Gregg of The Mutton Birds performing bass.

In an interview with RNZ, when asked about the meaning of the album name, Morrell jovially replied "it's a new element on the periodic table." The artwork of the album depicts "morellium" as the fictional periodic table element "119". Morrell has discussed the meaning of the songs on the album, stating they reflect past experiences and places she has visited; "Harry" relates to memories of her childhood in rural Cornwall, "Avignon" refers to the Avignon bridge, and "Strawberry Fool" is about ruminating and healing from crises.

== Release ==
Morrellium was digitally released on Bandcamp on 24 July 2026, published through Morrell's independent label KMR Records, and distributed via DRM NZ on various digital streaming services and platforms.

== Music videos ==
In November 2023, a music video for the single "Strawberry Fool" was released, featuring AI-generated images of a woman in a strawberry field, cropped to a 9:16 aspect ratio.

On 7 February 2025, a music video for "Avignon" was released. The production of the video was designed to be carbon neutral, based on the concept of sustainable film production, in accordance with British Standard 8909: 2011. The video cuts between two scenes, one of Morrell in a natural environment with flowers and water, and another of her dancing in a nightclub with a disco aesthetic and a nod to 1970s fashion.

On 4 June 2025, the single "Buddha (Forget You)" was released with a music video. The video has an avant-garde style and depicts a stage-like room, with a young Pierrot performing in the centre, as Morrell sings to the camera in the foreground. In the later part of the video, Morrell briefly becomes a Pierrot clown.

== Critical reception ==
Morrellium was received positively in general by music critics and journalists in New Zealand. Graham Reid noted the short length of the album but praised Morrell's vocal dexterity and noted the absence of "predictable pop", writing "its diversity and Morrell's intelligent lyrics reward repeated listening." John Bradbury of 13th Floor described Morrellium overall as "bright, rhythmically restless pop, with a dramatic streak and an undercurrent of loneliness and uncertainty."

== Track listing ==
No.	Title	Length
1.	"Strawberry Fool"	3:19
2.	"Avignon"	3:12
3.	"Buddha (forget you)"	3:59
4.	"Vérité"	3:16
5.	"Hoping & Wishing (Robins' Song)"	2:32
6.	"Prince of Kings"	3:29
7.	"Harry"	2:37
8.	"Wonderlea"	3:12
9.	"Chicken Book"	2:49
Total length:		28:28

== Personnel ==
Credits adapted from interviews and official release notes on Bandcamp.

- Kirsten Morrell – production, keyboards, vocals, backing vocals
- Clint Murphy – production, engineering
- Geoffrey Maddock – guitars, keyboards, recording, production on "Buddha (Forget You)"
- Alan Gregg – guitars, vocals
- Barkin Sertkaya – guitars
- Ben King – guitar, banjo
- Stephen Small – keyboards, strings
- Adrien De Croy – violin
- Bryn Reade – artwork, photography
- Florence Noble – photography
- Jack Tripper – photography
- Pete Woodroffe – recording
