= Natural Compression =

EP by Weta
- Released: 8 August 1999
- Recorded: Sing Sing Studios
- Genre: Rock
- Label: Warner Music
- Producer: Tom Larkin

Weta chronology
Natural Compression (1999)	Geographica (2000)

Natural Compression was the first EP by the New Zealand rock band Weta, being released in 1999.

The EP received radio attention in New Zealand, with the title track "Let It Go" becoming a staple of student and rock radio. Both "Let It Go" and "Got the Ju" would appear on the band's sole album, Geographica, in revised forms.

== Track listing ==
1. "Let It Go"
2. "Got the Ju"
3. "Where Have You Been?"
4. "Updown"

== Charts ==
Chart performance for Natural Compression
Chart (1999)	Peak position
Australia (ARIA)	92
New Zealand (Recorded Music NZ)	12
