= Calling On =

2000 single by Weta

Single by Weta

from the album Geographica
- Released: 2000
- Genre: Rock
- Label: WEA/Warner
- Songwriters: Aaron Tokona, Clinton den Heyer, Clinton Tokona

"Calling On" is a single by the New Zealand band Weta, off their only studio album Geographica. It peaked at #37 in the New Zealand RIANZ Chart.

== Track listing ==
1. "Calling On"
2. "Egg Face"
3. "Time"
4. "Calling On (Album Version)"
