= Merry Christmas Baby (album) =

- Nathan King with his daughter Ruby

Compilation album by Various Artists
- Released: 29 November 2009
- Recorded: 2007 – 2009
- Studio: York Street Studios; Trident Studios
- Genre: Christmas
- Length: 45:13
- Label: Plunket/Rhythmethod
- Producer: Monique Rhodes (executive); Various others (see Track listing)

Merry Christmas Baby is a compilation album by various New Zealand musicians as a fundraiser for the Royal New Zealand Plunket Society Inc. 8 of the 11 tracks are original songs. It was released on 11 October 2009.

== Track listing ==
Producers are in brackets next to title. Artists' labels are in brackets next to artist.

| No. | Title | Music | Artist | Length |
|---|---|---|---|---|
| 1. | "O Holy Night" | King, Si Moore (guitar); Stephen Small (keys); Clint Harris (bass); Scotty Pearson (drums) | Nathan King (Hum Records) | 4:31 |
| 2. | "No Room, No View (Only You)" | | Opshop (Siren Records) | 3:52 |
| 3. | "Barbie Dolls for Baghdad" | | The Jordan Luck Band | 3:17 |
| 4. | "I Will Do" | | Hollie Smith (Blue Note Records) | 4:43 |
| 5. | "Melody Bells" | | Kirsten Morrell (Warners Music NZ) | 3:42 |
| 6. | "Light of the Stable" (Wayne Bell) | | Jackie Clarke (Grant, Stan and Ernie) | 3:10 |
| 7. | "Let It Shine" | | Annie Crummer | 4:52 |
| 8. | "White Christmas" (Victor Stent) | | Whirimako Black (Local Music) | 5:51 |
| 9. | "One Child" | | Shona Laing | 3:04 |
| 10. | "What About The Children" | | House of Shem (Local Music) | 4:02 |
| 11. | "Forever Strong" (Nic Manders) | | Monique Rhodes | 4:09 |
| Total length: | | | | 45:13 |

== Chart positions ==
The album debuted at number 9 on the RIANZ Top 10 Music Compilations Chart, and peaked at number 8. As at 10 December 2009, over 10,000 copies had been sold.

| Chart (2009) | Peak position | Sales |
|---|---|---|
| New Zealand Compilations Chart | 8 | 7,500+ (gold) |
