= Keith Harris (music producer) =

American record producer from Illinois

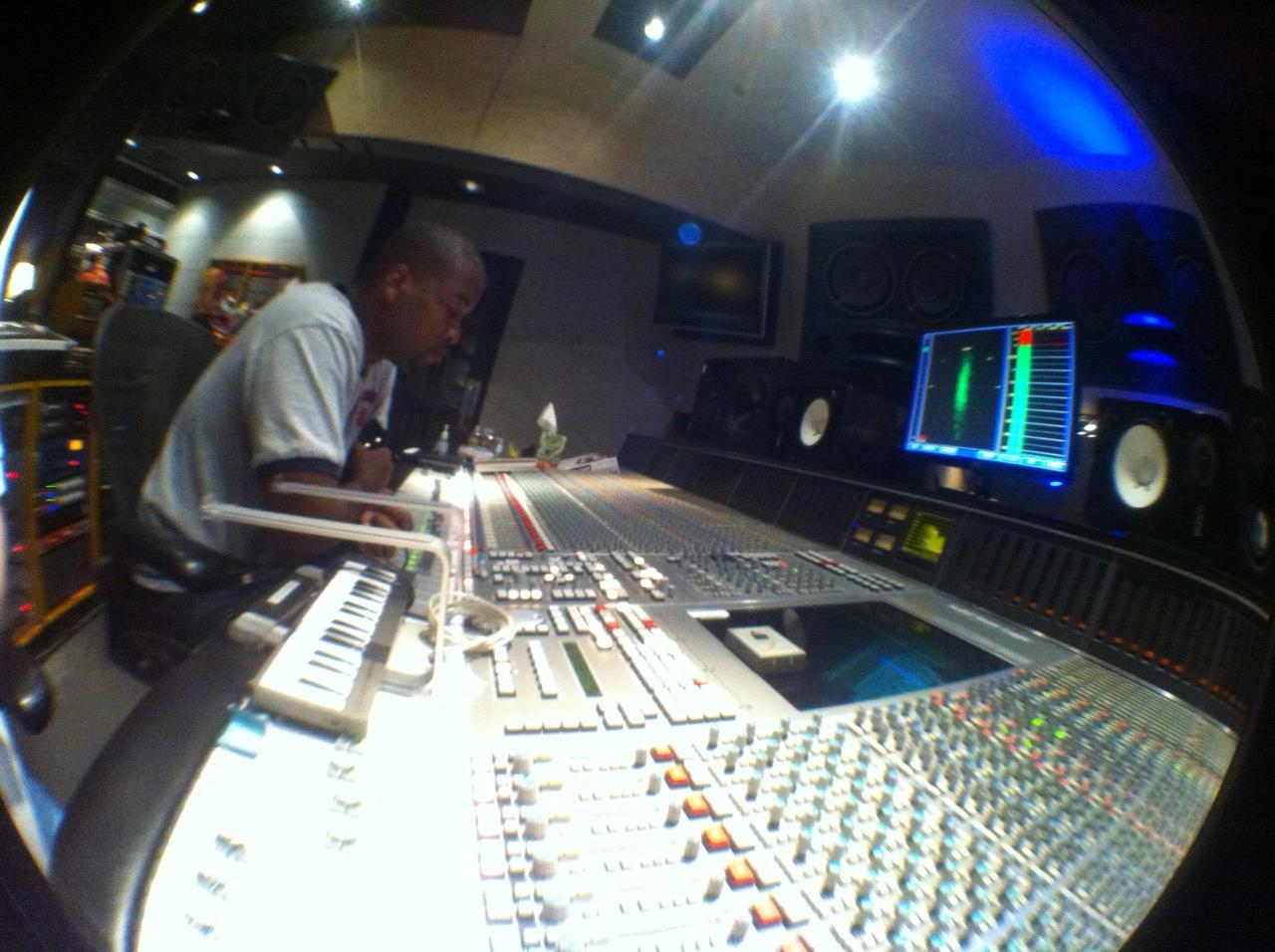
- Harris in the studio; 2010

Background information
- Born: Chicago, Illinois, U.S.
- Origin: Los Angeles, California, U.S.
- Genres: Hip hop; R&B; pop rock
- Occupations: Record producer; songwriter; multi-instrumentalist
- Instruments: Drums; keyboards
- Years active: 2003–present
- Labels: Harris Productions; A&M; Interscope; will.i.am

Keith Harris is an American record producer, songwriter and multi-instrumentalist.

Harris has worked with several popular recording and live acts in the music industry. Hits "Meet Me Halfway" and "Imma Be" by the Black Eyed Peas, "It's My Birthday" by will.i.am, "American Boy" by Estelle, "Feel Good" by Robin Thicke, "Can't Stop Won't Stop" by Usher, and "Gang Bang" by Madonna, and "Be Okay" and "Let's Rock" by Chrisette Michele are among the songs Harris has contributed to.

== Early life ==
Harris was born and raised in Chicago's South Side. He began his music career playing with the city's New Friendship Missionary Baptist Church gospel choir.

Recalling to Modern Drummer Magazine how he started: "Harris survived being thrown to the lions thanks in part to how he got his start behind the kit – playing drums in his church’s band. “I come from a Gospel background,” he explains. “Having to learn songs fast is part of the everyday life of a church musician doing Gospel music. A lot of times we would do concerts where there was no sheet music and we had thirteen songs in different styles. So just being able to absorb music quickly and keep it locked in is how I’ve learned to approach music.”

"At Chicago’s Curie performing arts high school, Harris picked up more important tools of the trade, building his sight-reading chops, honing the keyboard and bass skills he’d picked up in church, mastering concert percussion, and performing blazing drum solos with the advanced jazz band and stage bands. After high school, Harris attended Berklee College of Music in Boston, graduating with a degree in production and engineering. Armed with the skills and know-how to succeed on both sides of the music-making process, he relocated to New York to work as an engineer for Bad Boy Records hit maker Richard Younglord Frierson."

== Career ==
"Producer, songwriter and musician Keith Harris is the driving force behind many top 10 singles and Grammy Award winning hits. "Meet Me Halfway" and "Imma Be" by The Black Eyed Peas and Grammy winners "American Boy" by Estelle and "Be Okay" by Chrisette Michele are just a few. A Chicago native, Harris is best known for his drumming chops that round out the sounds of multi-platinum selling recording artists The Black Eyed Peas and Fergie. In addition, Harris' album credits read like a who's who of the music industry including Michael Jackson, Mary J. Blige, Mariah Carey, Christina Aguilera, Chris Brown, Pussycat Dolls, Earth Wind and Fire, John Legend and many more."

DRUM! Magazine says of Harris: "the hottest drummer in hip-hop.. pocket provider."

"Harris produced three tracks on the Peas' smash CD The E.N.D., including the Top Ten hit "Meet Me Halfway," which went Number One on the UK Singles Chart, and "Ring-A-Ling.""Imma Be" is the third single from the Peas record-breaking The E.N.D. to hit Number One. He worked on Fergie's 2006 solo smash The Dutchess.

In 2007 Harris released the album entitled "The Band Behind The Front" with Bucky Jonson on the BBE label.

== Filmography ==
Be Cool (2005)

Cast: Black Eyed Peas

La La Land (2016)

Cast: Cole

== Discography ==
Fergie – Double Dutchess

- "Life Goes On" (producer)

Nicki Minaj – The Pinkprint

- "Grand Piano" (writer & producer)

will.i.am – It's My Birthday

- "It's My Birthday" (writer)

Goapele – Strong As Glass

- "Strong As Glass", "Hey Boy", "My Love", "Powerful", "Truth Is" (producer)

Leah McFall – Name of the album TBA

- "Home" (producer)

Robin Thicke – Blurred Lines

- "Feel good" (co-writer)

Britney Spears – Britney Jean

- "Perfume" (producer)

will.i.am – #Willpower

- "Love Bullets" (writer)

Usher – Looking 4 Myself

- "Can't Stop Won't Stop" (producer)

Madonna – MDNA

- "Gang Bang" (writer)

The Black Eyed Peas – The E.N.D. (Energy Never Dies)

2010 Grammy Winner for Best Pop Album

- "Imma Be" x2 Plat (producer)
- "Meet Me Halfway" x2 Plat (producer)
- "Ring A Ling" (producer)
- "Outta My Head" (writer)
- "Where Ya Wanna Go" (writer)

Chrisette Michele – I Am

2009 Grammy Award for Best Urban/Alternative Performance

- "Be Okay" (producer)
- "Let's Rock" (writer)

Murs – Murs for President

- "Lookin Fly" (writer)

Mariah Carey – E=MC2

- "Heat" (writer)

Estelle – Shine

2009 Grammy Award for Best Rap/Sung Collaboration Nominee for Song of The Year

- "American Boy" (writer)

Jully Black – Revival

2008 Juno Winner for Best R&B Album

- Executive producer/ producer

Michael Jackson – Thriller 25

- "The Girl Is Mine" (producer)
- "P.Y.T." (producer)

Chris Brown – Exclusive

- "Picture Perfect" (writer, keyboards)

Nicole Scherzinger – Her Name is Nicole

- "Baby Love" (writer, Rhodes)

will.i.am – Songs About Girls

- "Will vs Superblack" (writer, synths)
- "Impatient" (writer, Rhodes)
- "Fly Girl" (writer, drums, Rhodes)

Busta Rhymes – The Big Bang

- "I Love My Chick" (producer)

Fergie – The Dutchess

- "All That I Got" (producer)
- "Close To You" (producer)

Kelis – Kelis Was Here

- "Till The Wheels Fall Off" (producer)
- "Weekend" (writer)

Mary J. Blige – The Breakthrough

- "About You" (writer)

The Black Eyed Peas – Monkey Business

- "Dum Diddy" (producer)
- "Bend Your Back" (writer)

Ginuwine – Back II da Basics

- "In Da Club" (producer)

Sleepy Brown – Mr. Brown

- "One of Dem Nights" (Writer, drums, bass)

Fergie – Poseidon Soundtrack

- "Won't Let You Fall" (writer)

Bucky Jonson – The Band Behind The Front

- Co-producer and writer

God Made Me Funky – Enter the Beat

- Producer

== Musician credits ==
will.i.am

- 2009 Inauguration Neighborhood Ball – Drums

AIRPUSHERS

- "Hold The Onions" – Drums

The Black Eyed Peas

- Drums, keys

Christina Aguilera

- Drums

John Legend

- Keyboards

Macy Gray

- Drums, organ, bass

Earth, Wind and Fire

- Drums

Mary J. Blige

- Keyboards

Ginuwine

- Keyboards

Sérgio Mendes

- Ride and Fills

Ricky Martin

- Drums

Busta Rhymes

- Keyboards

== Musical director ==
- Fergie
- Meghan Trainor
- Fifth Harmony
- Will.i.am – #Willpower
- Cheryl Cole – A Million Lights Tour 2012
- CeeLo Green - Loberace Show 2013
- Backstreet Boys – In a World Like This Tour 2013, Larger Than Life 2017-2019, Into the Millennium Residency 2025–2026

== Touring ==
- 2003 – present, drummer for The Black Eyed Peas and Fergie

== Press ==
=== Print ===
- May 2010, In Tune Magazine, "The Write Stuff" feature
- April 2010, Drumbead Magazine, "A Day in the Life”
- February 2010, Music Connection Magazine clip of Keith Harris on stage marriage proposal
- July 2009, Drum! Magazine, "Keith Harris, Soul in The Machine”
- Vibe Magazine article on the Bucky Jonson forthcoming CD
- September 2007, Drum! Magazine, Keith Harris article in the "Trial By Fire"
- Modern Drummer Magazine, "Pocket Comes First”
- 2005 Festival International de Jazz de Montreal
- 2005 Rolling Stone, "Up in It”
- 2005 Apple Pro/Music "Turning Ideas into Songs”
- 2005 M-‐Audio "On The Road with the Black Eyed Peas Band”
