= Bucky Jonson =

American musical band

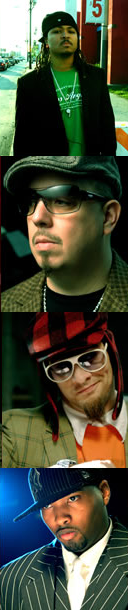
- Bucky Jonson

Background information
- Origin: Los Angeles, California, United States
- Genres: Hip hop; R&B; pop; dance; jazz fusion; funk
- Years active: 2000–present
- Labels: Barely Breaking Even
- Members: George Pajon; Printz Board; Keith Harris; Tim Izo
- Website: www.buckyjonson.com

Bucky Jonson is an American band and production team from California. The group is composed of musicians Printz Board (keyboards, trumpet, bass), George Pajon (guitars) Jr., Tim Izo (wood instruments, guitars and MPC) and Keith Harris (percussion and keyboards) with their first album, "The Band Behind The Front," released in 2007 on the BBE label.

Bucky Jonson is the live show band and recording team for the group The Black Eyed Peas and for Fergie's solo career. All the members of Bucky Jonson have co-writing and/or producing credits on the Black Eyed Peas album The E.N.D which won the Grammy for the Best Pop Vocal Album at the 52nd Grammy Awards and a variety of credits on other Black Eyed Peas albums and Fergie's solo album.

== Creative Commons Contributions ==
Bucky Jonson is part of the Creative Commons effort and are included in the community music site ccMixter.

Press Release from Creative Commons: "Now for the real news: The album’s individual solo tracks along with many outtakes have been made available with a BY-NC license. Bucky represents some of the best soul/funk virtuoso musicians on the scene today so it’s no surprise that these recording are the cleanest, best originally performed samples ever put into the Creative Commons Sample Pool (which is approaching the 50,000 sample count). There was so much material delivered from the band it took a small army of volunteers from the ccMixter community to chop the tracks into bite-size remix-able loops."

"George Pajon Jr. started out with a killer guitar solo, followed by a sax solo by Timmy Izo, a drum solo by Keith Harris and a trumpet solo by Printz Board, showcasing the extraordinary talent of the back band."
