= Aaron Tokona =

New Zealand guitarist and singer (1975–2020)

- Also known as: AHoriBuzz
- Born: Aaron Arana Tokona; 28 October 1975; Tauranga, New Zealand
- Died: 20 June 2020 (aged 44)
- Genres: Rock, dub, funk, folk rock
- Occupations: Musician, songwriter
- Instruments: Vocals, guitar
- Years active: 1990s–2020
- Label: Loop

Aaron Arana Tokona (28 October 1975 – 20 June 2020) was a New Zealand guitarist and singer.

Tokona was descended from Ngāi Te Rangi and Ngāti Maniapoto. This heritage played a significant role in his upbringing through his grandparents, who were well versed in Māoritanga, and inspired him as a performer after seeing other Māori artists, such as Billy T. James and Prince Tui Teka. Tokona grew up in Naenae, Lower Hutt and attending Naenae College. It was while attending the school, that he took part in the Smokefree Rockquest that help launch his musical career.

He performed as AHoriBuzz and was part of bands Weta, Cairo Knife Fight, Bongmaster and Fly My Pretties, and collaborated with some of New Zealand's most noted musicians.

Tokona died on 20 June 2020 after suffering a heart attack at home. He had one daughter.

== Death ==
Tokona's death was announced on 20 June 2020, following a sudden heart attack. The news was met with an outpouring of condolences from former bandmates, figures in the music industry and other New Zealand personalities. Partner of Prime Minister Jacinda Ardern, Clarke Gayford, described Tokona as a "wild, crazy, fruity, explosion of a frontman with a bottomless pit of talent", while former music industry executive Morgan Donoghue described him as "the sweetest guy and the most masterful guitarist." New Zealand band Unknown Mortal Orchestra said that Tokona had an "unforgettable energy", while Stuff music editor Vicki Anderson described him as a "big-hearted, beautiful man with a flair for the flamboyant."
