= Monique Rhodes =

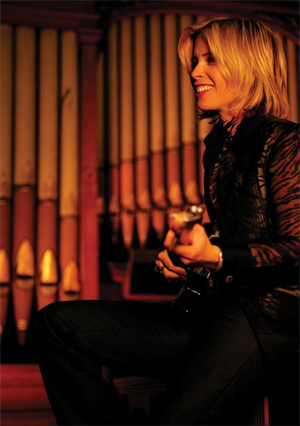
- Monique Rhodes performing at a studio.

Background information
- Origin: Dunedin, New Zealand
- Occupations: Musician, singer-songwriter, and record producer
- Instruments: piano, guitar, violin, vocals
- Years active: 2002 – present
- Labels: Sounds True, Barefaced Records (defunct), One People Records
- Website: www.moniquerhodes.com

Monique Rhodes is a singer, songwriter and producer born in New Zealand. Monique has produced two platinum selling albums in New Zealand, toured Europe twice with Chuck Berry and collaborated on music projects with the Dalai Lama.

== Biography ==
Rhodes, originally from New Zealand, moved to Sydney to pursue her career as a musician. In 2002, her first self-titled EP was released by Barefaced Records. She then released Awakening, her debut album in 2005, while in Sydney. Over the next few years, Rhodes toured Europe twice as an opening act for Chuck Berry performances. She later produced two platinum selling charity albums, Merry Christmas Baby and So This is Christmas to raise awareness about child abuse in New Zealand..

In 2008, Rhodes created a vineyard tour of New Zealand performing with Kiwi musician Shona Laing.

In 2010, Rhodes brought together a number of the biggest names in New Zealand music, including Opshop, Nathan King, Shona Laing and Hollie Smith who contributed to the awareness of child abuse. She produced the Christmas album Merry Christmas Baby whose proceeds went to the Royal New Zealand Plunket Society.

In 2013 Rhodes teamed up with Colorado-based company Sounds True to produce the album titled Heart Beats which contains spiritual teachings and features spiritual teachers such as Pema Chödrön, Adyashanti, Pema Chödrön, Thich Nhat Hanh, Caroline Myss, Tara Brach, Mark Nepo, Sogyal Rinpoche, and Eckhart Tolle.

== Discography ==
=== Albums ===
Date of Release	Title	Label
1 December 2013	Heart Beats	Sounds True
4 April 2008	Awakening	Barefaced Records

=== Compilation albums ===
Date of Release	Title	Label	Chart Position	Certification
29 November 2009	Merry Christmas Baby	Hum Records, Siren Records, Blue Note Records, Warners Music NZ.	8	Gold
29 September 2008	So This is Christmas	Sony Music		Platinum
