= Nick Gaffaney =

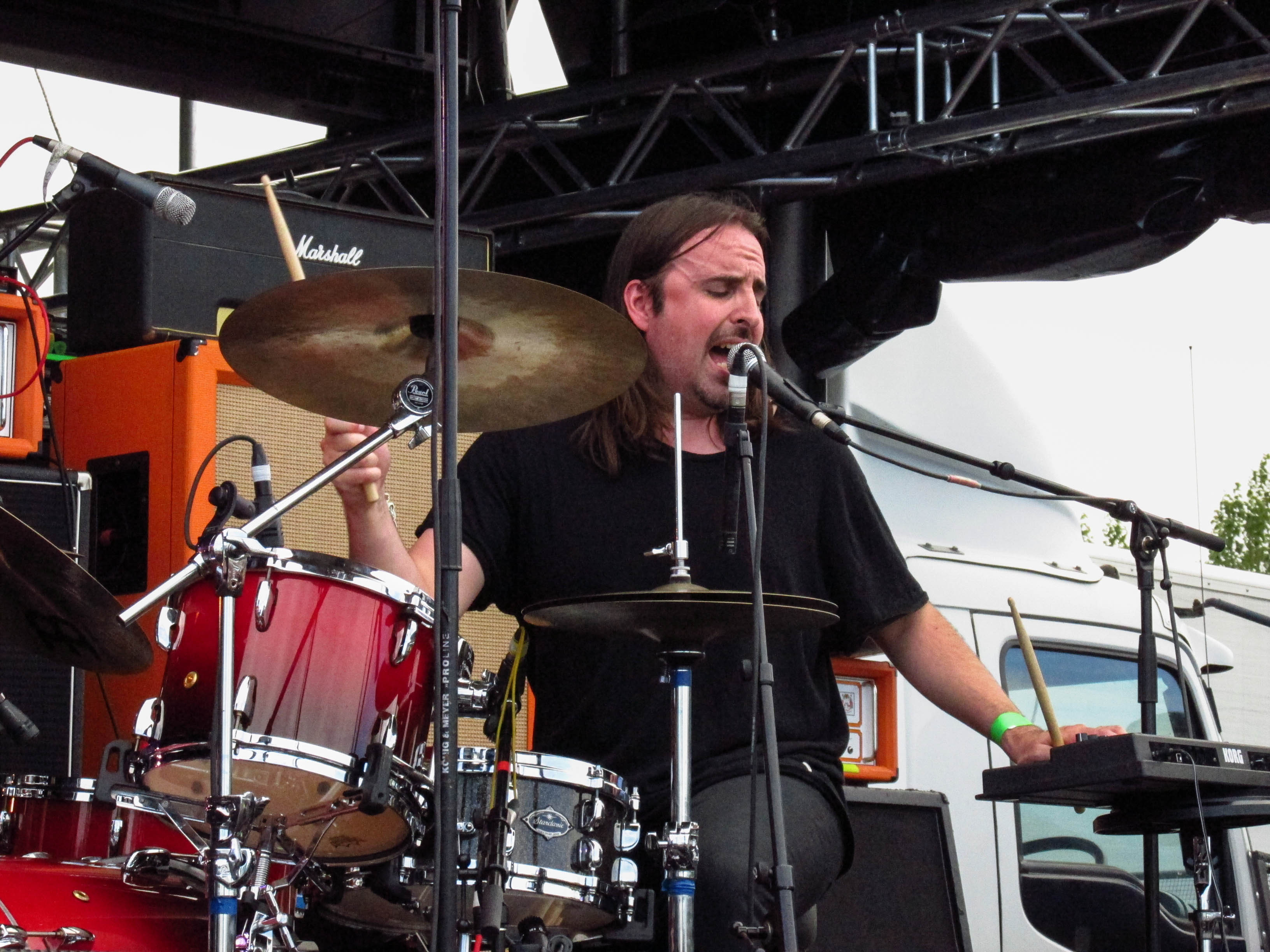
- Nick Gaffaney, FVEY Tour, 2015

Background information
- Born: 1978 (age 47–48); Christchurch, New Zealand
- Genres: Rock, Industrial music, jazz, hip hop, electronica
- Occupations: Musician, songwriter, composer
- Instruments: Drums, vocals, electric guitar
- Years active: 1990–present
- Spouse: Cass Gaffaney

Nick Gaffaney is a professional drummer, songwriter and singer from New Zealand, and is best known for the band Cairo Knife Fight.

== Career ==
Gaffaney began his career as a session and recording artist, having played drums for Dimmer, Goldenhorse, Hollie Smith and has recorded and performed with songwriters such as Anika Moa, Jan Hellriegel, Leila Adu and Godfrey de Grut; Hip Hop/Roots artists Scribe, Fat Freddy's Drop, Solaa, King Kapisi, Nuvonesia, and Sangha; Jazz musicians Mark de Clive-Lowe, Joel Haines, The New Loungehead and Jeff Henderson.

As a freelance percussionist, Gaffaney has worked extensively with Kog Transmissions for live industrial groups such as Avotor and created electro-pop versions of Head Like a Hole songs with Joost Langveld.

In 2001, Gaffaney was invited to an Artist-in-residence position at the Darpana Academy of Performing Arts in Ahmedabad, India. The position involved studying South Indian folk music, writing soundtracks for a series of dance performances by the internationally renown Darpana dance group.

Gaffaney has worked on film soundtracks for The Truth about Demons and Fracture with composer Victoria Kelly.

In 2014, Gaffaney relocated to Los Angeles with his wife Cass and Geoff Maddock, and formed Santa Barbara. The group renamed to Young Winona the following year, and released several singles. In 2023, Gaffaney moved to Las Vegas, putting the group on hiatus.

== Awards ==
Gaffaney won the 2013 APRA Professional Development Award.

=== Nominations ===
In 2015, Cairo Knife Fight's album The Colossus was nominated by the New Zealand Music Awards for Best Rock Album. The Colossus was also nominated in 2016 for the Taite Music Prize.

== Endorsements ==
- Tama Drums
- Meinl Cymbals
