= Kirsten Morrell =

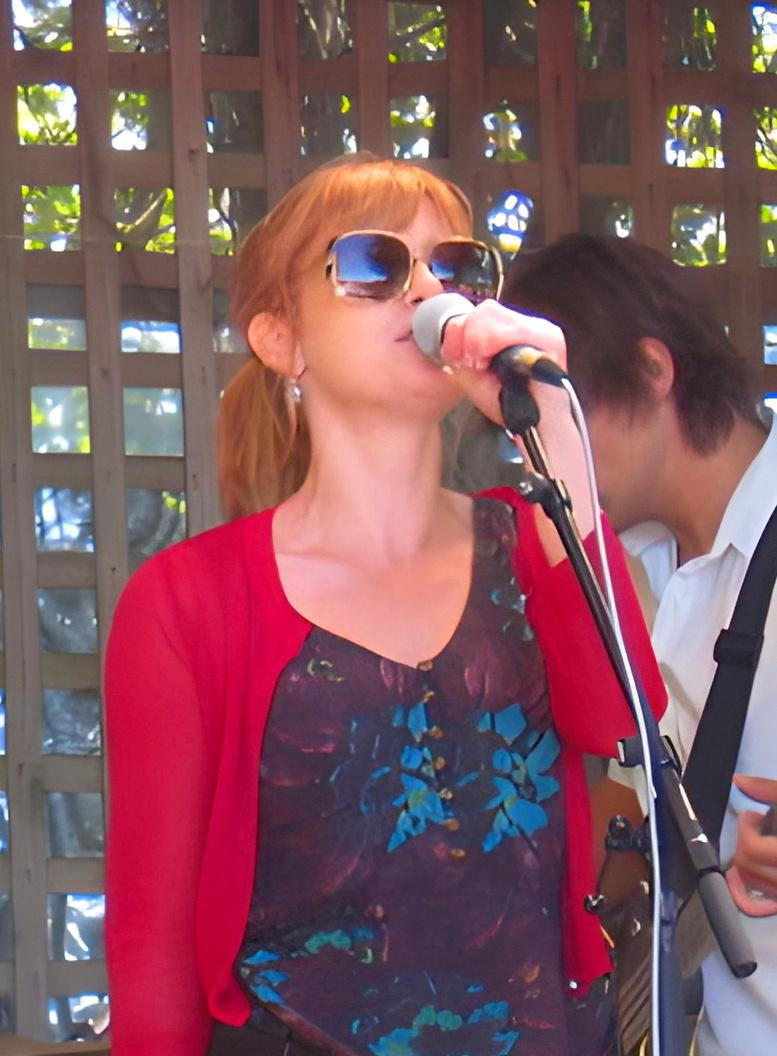
- Morrell performing with Goldenhorse in 2005

Background information
- Also known as: Kirsten Reade; Kirsten Reade-Morrell; Kirsten Mccoll Reade
- Born: December 1974 (age 51); Hampstead, London, England
- Genres: Pop; Classical music
- Occupations: Singer-songwriter, opera singer
- Instruments: Vocals, piano, guitar
- Labels: KMR Records; Warner Music New Zealand
- Member of: Goldenhorse

Kirsten Morrell (born Kirsten Maccoll Reade; December 1974) is a British-born New Zealand singer and songwriter, best known as the lead singer of the band Goldenhorse.

Morrell is a trained operatic singer and performed as a national singer in the New Zealand Opera for two years. In the early 2000s, she found success fronting the pop group Goldenhorse, which debuted in 2002 with the chart topping album Riverhead. The band found continued success with the 2005 release of Out of the Moon, which also went platinum. In 2007 the band released their final album, Reporter, before entering a long hiatus.

Morrell recorded her first album as a solo artist with the 2010 release of Ultraviolet, and returned to London to join the Crouch End Festival Chorus. Following the COVID-19 pandemic, Morrell began writing new solo material and returned to New Zealand, where she formed KMR Records, an independent label. In 2026, she released her second solo album, Morrellium.

Morrell has been an active spokesperson for equitable trade and environmental causes, including as an ambassador for Greenpeace, and backing campaigns by Fairtrade. In 2005, she sang and appeared in the music video for Greenpeace version of "Anchor Me", which peaked at 3 on the New Zealand charts.

== Early life ==
Morrell was born to Tricia Reade in London, England, and was raised in Hampstead. Her parents eventually left London to start an organic farm in rural Cornwall, where Morrell spent the later part of her childhood. Morrell and her family moved to New Zealand when she was 12, uniting with her grandparents who lived in Taupō.

Morrell attended Selwyn College in Auckland, receiving a music scholarship and classical training. In her teens, she began an English literature degree at the University of Auckland, which was put on hold until she returned to study at 24. She subsequently became a qualified yoga teacher, and in 2013, began studying an arts management masters at the Auckland University of Technology.

== Career ==
Morrell has been involved in the music industry since the 90s, but has worked as a volunteer, a board member, executive and manager in various organizations, including People Tree, The Fair Trade Foundation, New Zealand Opera and Crouch End Festival Chorus, to name some. Morrell was also involved in the New Zealand Opera chorus for 12 years, performing as a core soprano.

=== 1999–2007: Goldenhorse ===
Morrell formed Goldenhorse in 1999 with guitarist Geoff Maddock. In 2002, Goldenhorse released Riverhead to commercial success, going 3× platinum and topping the New Zealand charts. The album was self-funded and had been recorded independently without a label, using money from Morrell's mother and equipment loaned from Tim Finn and Neil Finn. It was recorded on-and-off over a year, with most of the recording in a home studio in the Waitakere Ranges. The success of the album subsequently lead to a record deal with Siren Records.

With the assistance of veteran producer Murray Grindlay, Goldenhorse followed-up in 2005 with Out of the Moon, which peaked at number 2 on the charts and went platinum. The band promptly began touring, including overseas in London.

In 2007 after returning from their UK tour, the band released Reporter to lackluster commercial sales, briefly entering the top 40 chart at 38. Shortly after, Goldenhorse went on hiatus and has not reformed since, with the members moving on to different projects. In 2013, Morrell claimed not all members of the band got along with each other, but that she still considered Goldenhorse an "entity."

=== 2009–2019: Ultraviolet and Crouch End Festival Chorus ===
In 2009, Morrell worked with producer Jol Mulhullond to record her 2010 debut solo album, Ultraviolet. It spent two weeks on the charts, peaking at 25, and was received with mixed reviews.

Following the release of Ultraviolet, Morrell moved back to London, where she joined Crouch End Festival Chorus, a leading symphonic choir which has performed at the BBC Proms. She has appeared on several of their classical recordings.

In 2016, Morrell started a yoga business, SingingTreeYoga, in North London.

=== 2020–present: Solo return with Morrellium ===
During the COVID-19 pandemic, Morrell began writing new solo material. She returned to New Zealand and setup a home studio in Auckland. In 2022, Morrell incorporated KMR Records, her own independent label. She released her first new single, "Strawberry Fool", the following year. Between 2023 and 2026, Morrell released several singles with music videos in anticipation of her second solo album, including "Buddha (Forget You)". In July 2026, Morrell released the album, Morrellium. It was produced by Clint Murphy who worked with Goldenhorse on Reporter.

== Personal life ==
Morrell has family from England and from New Zealand, the latter originating from Lyall Bay, Wellington. Morrell previously lived in Wellington and currently resides in central Auckland, but over the years has periodically lived in England pursuing music and opera. Her mother, Tricia, lives in Ponsonby. Morrell also has an older brother, Bryne Reade, born two years earlier, who is a journalist, filmmaker, and photographer. Morrell was formerly in a long-term relationship with Goldenhorse band mate and collaborator Geoff Maddock.

In a 2013 interview, Morrell suggested that her success with Goldenhorse did not earn her much money, and that she was living in a rented home with three flatmates, stating "there are people who get paid to do their art, but I never seem to. At some point I was.'' In a 2023 interview with RNZ, when asked if music was her full-time occupation, Morrell simply replied "I wish."

=== Political views and advocacy ===
Morrell has been regularly involved in fair trade and environmental organisations, using her profile to support fundraisers and campaigns. She was an ambassador for Greenpeace New Zealand, and has attended various events and fundraisers for the organisation. In 2005, she sang and appeared in the music video for Greenpeace's charity cover of "Anchor Me" which peaked at 3 on the New Zealand charts. Morrell has publicly opposed the mining of conservation land and the whaling industry.

In 2007, Morrell fronted a fundraising campaign by Oxfam in support of fair trade for coffee producers. In 2009, Morrel participated in the Auckland supercity hikoi protests.

Morrell has been a supporter of Fair Trade Auckland and was actively involved in the organisation in the early 2010s, including as a signature collector for campaigns to support Auckland becoming a fair trade city.

In 2014, Morrell worked at a call center for the "Get Out and Vote" campaign organised by the Council of Trade Unions.

== Discography ==
=== Albums ===
- Ultraviolet (2010)
- Morrellium (2026)

=== Singles ===
- "Melody Bells" (2009)
- "I'm Free" (2011)
- "Strawberry Fool" (2023)
- "Harry" (2023)
- "Avignon" (2023)
- "Buddha (Forget You)" (2025)

=== As featured artist ===
- "Anchor Me" (2005)
