= Richard Fromont =

- Born: Richard Trevor Fromont; 17 September 1969 (age 57) Auckland, New Zealand
- Height: 2.03 m (6 ft 8 in)
- Weight: 106 kg (234 lb)
- School: Avondale College

Rugby union career
- Position: Lock
Senior career
Years	Team	Apps	(Points)
1998–2001	SU Agen		
Provincial / State sides
Years	Team	Apps	(Points)
1993–97	Auckland	61	
1998	Counties Manukau		
International career
Years	Team	Apps	(Points)
1993–95	New Zealand	0	(0)

Richard Trevor Fromont (born 17 September 1969) is a former New Zealand rugby union player. A lock, Fromont represented Auckland and Counties Manukau at a provincial level, and was a member of the New Zealand national side, the All Blacks, in 1993 and 1995. He played ten matches for the All Blacks but did not play any internationals.
