= Geographica (album) =

Studio album by Weta
- Released: 18 September 2000
- Recorded: Sing Sing Studios
- Genre: Rock
- Length: 55:13
- Label: Warner Music
- Producer: Steve James

Weta chronology
Natural Compression (EP)	Geographica

Geographica is the sole full-length album by New Zealand rock band Weta, released in 2000.

Rumoured to cost up to $400,000, Weta's management planned to use the album to launch the band in Australia, but the band broke up before its release in that country. With no band to support the album on tour, Warner Music decided only to release the album in NZ, where it reached 8 on the charts and went platinum.

"Calling On" served as lead single, with "Snapshot" and "If I Will I Can" released as radio-only singles after the album's release.

"Let It Go" had already been released to radio on the Natural Compression EP.

The single "Calling On" serves as the opening music for the film When Strangers Appear.

The album re-entered the New Zealand charts in 2021, peaking at number 5.

== Track listing ==
1. "Let It Go" - 4:00
2. "Calling On" - 5:27
3. "Geographica" - 5:36
4. "If I Will I Can" - 5:52
5. "Sweet Surrender" - 4:54
6. "Conversations" - 5:29
7. "Snapshot" - 4:36
8. "Hole" - 4:26
9. "Sleep" - 4:22
10. "Got the Ju" - 5:26
11. "Missed Again (Joy's Song)" - 5:05
