= Weta (band) =

- Origin: Wellington, New Zealand
- Years active: 1995–2001, 2008–2009
- Past members: Aaron Tokona; Gabriel Atkinson; Clinton den Heyer; Clinton Tokona

Weta were a four-piece rock band from Wellington, New Zealand.

The band was formed in 1995. It supported touring bands including Everclear, Foo Fighters, and Soundgarden - after a Wellington Town Hall show, Soundgarden bassist Ben Shepherd presented Clinton Tokona with his Music Man bass guitar after falling out with it on stage.

In 1997 Aaron Tokona temporarily filled in on guitar for Adelaide, Australia band The Superjesus, after guitarist Chris Tennent left the band. When offered the position full-time, Tokona declined in order to concentrate on Weta. Impressed with his abilities as a guitarist, former Superjesus manager Dan Hennessy took a keen interest in the band and when he took over as A&R chief at Warner Bros. Records Australia, Weta were added to their roster and the band moved to Melbourne, Australia in 1999.

The band's first release came in 1998 with the Natural Compression EP, which had been recorded at Marmalade Studios in Wellington by Tim Farrant, with friend and Shihad drummer Tom Larkin producing.

September 2000 saw the New Zealand release of their debut album, Geographica.

The band broke up early in 2001, after Aaron Tokona "stopped believing that I was doing what I really wanted to do. I'm not talking about playing music because I think I'll always do music. I'm talking about playing music in the sense of being in a band or being in public." The album, recorded at Melbourne's Sing Sing studios and produced by Steve James, was never released in Australia. The song "Calling On" received regular airplay on Australian radio station Triple J during 2001, however it failed to break into the station's Hottest 100 that year.

Weta reformed and played small venues in Auckland, Wellington and Christchurch and some festivals during late 2008/early 2009, but broke up again shortly afterward.

== Band members ==
- Aaron Tokona (vocals/guitar)
- Gabriel Atkinson (vocals/guitar)
- Clinton Den Heyer (drums)
- Clinton Tokona (bass guitar)

== Discography ==
| Release date | Title | Label | Peak chart positions | | Certification |
| Release date | Title | Label | NZ | AUS | Certification |
Albums
| 18 September 2000 | Geographica | Warner Bros. | 5 | — | RMNZ: Platinum |
EPs
| 8 August 1999 | Natural Compression | Warner Bros. | 12 | 92 | – |
Singles
| 27 August 2000 | Calling On | Warner Bros. | 37 | — | |
| 27 November 2020 | So Far, So Close | Warner Bros. | Unknown | Unknown | |
