= Goldenhorse =

New Zealand pop group

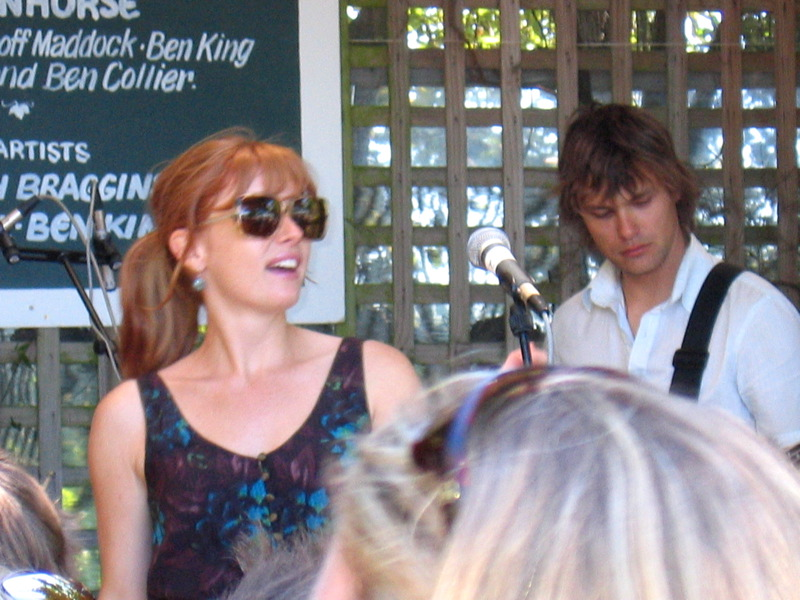
- Goldenhorse performing in 2005

Background information
- Origin: New Zealand
- Genres: Pop, folk-pop, pop-rock
- Years active: 1999–2007 (hiatus), 2011, 2016
- Label: Siren Records
- Members: Kirsten Morrell; Geoff Maddock; Joel Wilton; Ben King; Vince Hine

Goldenhorse is a pop and folk-pop band from New Zealand. The group was formed in 1999 by lead vocalist Kirsten Morrell and guitarist Geoff Maddock, who brought in Joel Wilton and Ben King from other projects to found the initial lineup.

Goldenhorse found success in 2002 with their debut album Riverhead, a slow-burner on the charts which peaked at number 1 in 2004, and went triple platinum. Goldenhorse built on the late success of Riverhead with the 2005 release of Out of the Moon which also went platinum. The albums spawned charting singles including "Maybe Tomorrow" which became the most played local song on radio in 2003, "Wake Up Brother", and "Out of the Moon".

Goldenhorse is considered a significant New Zealand band from the 2000s, with Riverhead featured in subsequent books and articles as a notable album in New Zealand music. It was also a finalist in the 2003 Australasian Performing Rights Association's Silver Scroll Awards, among other award nominations.

In 2007 following a European tour, the band released Reporter, their final album to date, which briefly entered the top 40 charts at 38. After mediocre commercial performance, the band entered a long hiatus. Goldenhorse has reunited twice, once in 2011 and again in 2016, for one-off performances in support of local events, but the group has not officially reformed or worked on another project since, with its members moving onto different projects.

== History ==
=== Formation and Riverhead (1999–2004) ===
Cover for the 2004 re-release of Riverhead featuring the band

In 1999, Morrell formed Goldenhorse with guitarist Geoff Maddock. The pair were seeking to form a band to play at a wedding; Ben King was brought in as a founding member, and Maddock brought over drummer Joel Wilton from his existing band Bressa Creeting Cake.

Goldenhorse began recording their first album Riverhead on a low budget and without a label. Morrell had secured limited funding from her mother, and the group had used its local connections to acquire equipment loaned from Tim Finn and Neil Finn. The project was recorded on and off over a year, with most of the recording taking place in the Waitakere Ranges from a small home studio.

Riverhead was a slow-burner upon release, remaining on the charts for two years before climbing to number 1 in 2004. The success of the album subsequently lead to a record deal with Siren Records. The album spawned singles including "Maybe Tomorrow" which was nominated for several awards, including as a finalist in the 2003 Australasian Performing Rights Association's Silver Scroll Awards and in the 2004 New Zealand Music Awards. It was also the most played local song on New Zealand radio for 2002/2003.

=== Out of the Moon and Europe tour (2005–2006) ===
Following the latent chart-topping of Riverhead, Goldenhorse returned to the studio for their follow-up album, Out of the Moon. Now with a bigger budget and more resources, the group worked with veteran producer Murray Grindlay on the project, describing the process as a stark contrast to the difficulty of recording Riverhead. Their studio dynamic had also been influenced by the addition of guitarist Andrew Clark, and saw the introduction of Ben Collier and Vincent Hine into the mix.

Out of the Moon reached number 2 on the charts and went platinum. The singles "Out of the Moon", "Fish", and "Run Run Run" saw radio play and music videos to support their release. The band began a touring schedule overseas, particularly Europe, including England and Germany.

=== Reporter and hiatus (2007) ===
In 2007, Goldenhorse had returned from their overseas tour and were preparing to release Reporter as a return to the New Zealand music scene. The album was recorded in Roundhead Studios with sound engineer Clint Murphy and producer Phil Vinall, the latter known for working with Radiohead and Placebo among other big acts. In addition, Nick Gaffaney joined the band to provide drums.

Reporter was released to lackluster commercial performance, spending a week in the top 40 charts peaking at 38. Goldenhorse entered hiatus shortly after, and to date, has not reformed to work on a new project. In 2013, Morrell claimed that she still saw Goldenhorse as an "entity" but that the band members didn't all get along with each other.

Goldenhorse's members have since moved on to other projects. Morrell embarked on a solo career with her 2010 debut album Ultraviolet. King has worked as a producer and began a new musical project named Grand Rapids which debuted with Faintheartedness in 2011. Wilton, who had formerly been a science and chemistry teacher, returned to study and subsequently became the principal of Havelock North High School. Maddock moved to Los Angeles where he has worked with Natasha Bedingfield and Daniel Bedingfield, and has written soundtracks as a composer.

In 2026, King and Maddock collaborated on Morrell's second album, Morrellium. Morrell described her former band members as "all good friends", stating "we’ve had the tenacity to work through any issues and can all collaborate now."

=== Other appearances ===
In 2011, Goldenhorse reunited for a single performance as part of the Rugby World Cup 2011 celebrations. In 2016, Morrell flew in from London to reunite with Goldenhorse for a one-off performance at an event in honour of Hone Tuwhare at Opera House in Wellington.

== Discography ==
Goldenhorse discography
- Studio albums: 3
- Singles: 8

=== Studio albums ===
| Year | Title | Details | Peak chart positions | RIANZ Certification |
| Year | Title | Details | NZ | RIANZ Certification |
|---|---|---|---|---|
| 2002 | Riverhead | Released: 14 October 2002; Label: Siren Records; Formats: CD, digital download | 1 | 3× Platinum |
| 2005 | Out of the Moon | Released: 31 March 2005; Label: Siren Records; Formats: CD, digital download | 2 | Platinum |
| 2007 | Reporter | Released: 29 October 2007; Label: Siren Records; Formats: CD, digital download | 38 | |

=== Singles ===
| Year | Title | Peak chart positions | Album |
| Year | Title | NZ | Album |
|---|---|---|---|
| 2002 | "Golden Dawn" | — | Riverhead |
| 2003 | "Maybe Tomorrow" | 10 | Riverhead |
| 2003 | "Wake Up Brother" | 17 | Riverhead |
| 2004 | "Northern Lights" | 43 | Riverhead |
| 2004 | "Run Run Run" | — | Out of the Moon |
| 2005 | "Out of the Moon" | 21 | Out of the Moon |
| 2006 | "Don't Wake Me Up" | — | Out of the Moon |
| 2007 | "Jump into the Sun" | — | Reporter |
"—" denotes a recording that did not chart or was not released in that territory.

== Awards and nominations ==
In 2003, the single "Maybe Tomorrow" was awarded an APRA Silver Scroll Award for Most Performed New Zealand Work.

In 2005 and 2008, Maddock was nominated for an APRA Silver Scroll Award for his songwriting on the singles "Out of the Moon" from the album of the same name, and "Say My Name" from Reporter.
