= Out of the Moon =

Studio album by Goldenhorse
- Released: 31 March 2005
- Label: Siren Records

Goldenhorse chronology
Riverhead (2002)	Out of the Moon (2005)	Reporter (2007)

Singles from Out Of The Moon
- 1. "Run Run Run" Released: 2004; 2. "Out of the Moon" Released: 2005; 3. "Don't Wake Me Up" Released: 2005

Out of the Moon is the second album by New Zealand band Goldenhorse, released in 2005 under Siren Records. The album peaked at No. 2 on the RIANZ music chart.

== Track listing ==
1. "Don't Wake Me Up"
2. "Used to Think"
3. "Out of the Moon"
4. "Cool Pants"
5. "Run Run Run"
6. "Cowgirl Lament"
7. "Fish"
8. "Alien"
9. "Four Minute Drive"
10. "Trinkity Trunk"
11. "Waltz"
12. "Cold Mountainside"
13. "Emptied Out"

== Charts ==
Chart (2005)	Peak position
New Zealand Albums (RMNZ)	2
