= Ben King (producer) =

Ben King is a New Zealand based producer, guitarist, singer, musical director and writer who has worked with artists such as Bic Runga, Tim Finn, Dave Dobbyn, Boh Runga, Brooke Fraser, Daniel Bedingfield and others. King is a founding member of the multi-platinum selling band Goldenhorse, and the founder of the band, Grand Rapids. A regular collaborator with Creative Director and Artist, Adam Bryce (Lilly Allen, SlamXHype, Nike), King was also the co-founder of Plaything Gallery, and works with Bryce to create films and works within commercial advertising realms and artistically driven projects.
