= Reporter (album) =

Studio album by Goldenhorse
- Released: October 29, 2007
- Genre: Folk
- Length: 39:32
- Label: Siren
- Producer: Phil Vinall, Clint Murphy, Goldenhorse

Goldenhorse chronology
Out of the Moon (2005)	Reporter (2007)

Singles from Reporter
- 1. "Jump Into the Sun" Released: October 2007

Reporter is the third album by New Zealand band Goldenhorse, released in 2007 under Siren Records. The album reached no. 38 on the New Zealand charts.

== Track listing ==
1. "The Last Train"
2. "Saying My Name"
3. "Calico Reporter"
4. "Wisen Up"
5. "You Want It All"
6. "Get the Feeling"
7. "Streetlights"
8. "Lucky"
9. "Stone Wall"
10. "Telephone Call"
11. "Jump Into the Sun"
12. "Change of Heart"

== Charts ==
Chart (2007)	Peak position
New Zealand Albums (RMNZ)	38
