= Leisure (band) =

New Zealand band

- Origin: Auckland, New Zealand
- Genres: dance; synth-pop; indie pop; blue-eyed soul; alternative R&B; funk; nu-disco; nu-jazz
- Years active: 2015–present
- Label: Nettwerk
- Spinoff of: Goodnight Nurse; Kids of 88; Kidz in Space; Cool Rainbows
- Members: Djeisan Suskov; Jaden Parkes; Josh Fountain; Tom Young; Jordan Arts; Paul Roper
- Website: www.theleisurecollective.com

Leisure (stylized as LEISURE) are a New Zealand electronic music project from Auckland, formed in Muriwai in 2015. The group's current lineup consists of Djeisan Suskov, Jaden Parkes, Josh Fountain, Tom Young, Jordan Arts and Paul Roper, all established musicians and producers who have performed in the Auckland's music scene since the early 2000s.

They are currently signed to Nettwerk Records and to date, have self-produced and released five studio albums: Leisure (2016), Twister (2019), Sunsetter (2021), Leisurevision (2023), and their fifth & most recent, Welcome to the Mood on 12 September 2025.

== History ==
Each member of the group, individually established themselves in New Zealand's music industry during the early 2000s, performing in their respective bands or projects. Suskov is best known for his psych-indie pop act, Cool Rainbows while Parkes initially gained recognition as the drummer for Auckland pop punk band, Goodnight Nurse, whose 2006 debut album Always and Never was certified gold shortly after its release.

Following Goodnight Nurse's breakup in 2010, the band's guitarist Sam McCarthy would go on to focus on his new wave project, Kids of 88 with his longtime friend, Arts. The two would go on to release their debut album Sugarpills on 16 August 2010 via Sony Music, which stemmed hits such as "My House", "Just a Little Bit" and "Downtown" which all broke into the Top 20 on the Official New Zealand Music Chart.

Fountain made his name as a member of EDM, hip-hop group, Kidz in Space before becoming an in-demand producer, most notably for Auckland alternative pop singer/songwriter, Benee.

The initial formation of the group took place in 2015, after members had casual writing sessions during a spontaneous holiday at a bach in Muriwai, a West Coast region of Auckland. The group has described their sound as an unusual melting-pot of contributions, having influences from funk, 1990s boom bap and R&B, and dance-pop from the early 2000s.

The group released their debut single, "Got It Bad" on 23 April 2015 via SoundCloud to immediate acclaim and coverage, partly due to not revealing their identities during the initial release to garner mystery and intrigue about the project. The song was also featured in the American television drama You.

The band released their fifth album, Welcome to the Mood on 12 September 2025.

== Members ==
- Djeisan Suskov – lead guitar, vocals, production (2015–present)
- Tom Young – bass, vocals, production (2015–present)
- Jaden Parkes – rhythm guitar, vocals, production (2015–present)
- Josh Fountain – keyboards, rhodes, sampler, vocals, production (2015–present)
- Jordan Arts – percussion, synthesizer, sampler, vocals, production (2015–present)
- Paul Roper – drums (2023–present; touring member 2017–2022)

Touring

- Alex Freer – drums (2015–2016)

== Discography ==
=== Albums ===
| Title | Album details |
|---|---|
| Leisure | Released: 21 October 2016; Label: Independent, Nettwerk |
| Twister | Released: 26 July 2019; Label: Nettwerk |
| Sunsetter | Released: 3 December 2021; Label: Nettwerk |
| Leisurevision | Released: 29 September 2023; Label: Nettwerk |
| Welcome to the Mood | Released: 12 September 2025; Label: Nettwerk |

=== EPs ===
| Title | EP details |
|---|---|
| Side A | Released: 30 October 2020; Label: Nettwerk |
| Side B | Released: 1 October 2021; Label: Nettwerk |

=== Charted or certified singles ===
| Title | Year | Peak chart positions | Certifications | Album |
| Title | Year | NZ Hot | Certifications | Album |
|---|---|---|---|---|
| "Slipping Away" | 2020 | — | ARIA: Gold; RMNZ: Platinum | Sunsetter |
| "Diamonds" | 2025 | 28 | | Welcome to the Mood |
