= Blindfold Me =

2006 single by Kelis featuring Nas

Single by Kelis featuring Nas

from the album Kelis Was Here
- Released: October 3, 2006
- Genre: Hip hop
- Length: 3:48
- Label: Jive; LaFace
- Songwriters: Sean Garrett; Jamal Jones; Nas (Note: Remix version)
- Producers: Polow da Don; Sean Garrett

Kelis singles chronology
"I Love My Chick" (2006)	"Blindfold Me" (2006)	"Lil Star" (2007)

Nas singles chronology
"Road to Zion" (2005)	"Blindfold Me" (2006)	"Hip Hop Is Dead" (2006)

"Blindfold Me" is a hip hop song by American singer Kelis from her fourth studio album, Kelis Was Here (2006). It was written and produced by Sean Garrett and Polow da Don. A remix, featuring American rapper Nas, was released as the album's second single in the United States on October 3, 2006. Although the Neptunes were long-time collaborators of Kelis, Kelis Was Here was her first album without their involvement as she opted for a more diverse team of record producers, which included Garrett and Polow da Don.

The song's lyrics focus on sex talk. Along with hip hop, music critics associated the track's style with pop rap and club music. Upon its release, "Blindfold Me" received a mixed response. While some critics cited it as a highlight from Kelis Was Here and enjoyed Kelis's sexual personality, others criticized its placement on the album's track listing as resulting in a jarring tonal shift.

Marc Klasfeld directed the song's music video, which features Nas tying up Kelis. Premiering September 6, 2006, the video was shown on an episode of the documentary series Access Granted alongside a behind-the-scenes feature. The song was further promoted with a 12-inch single, released on October 3, 2006. "Blindfold Me" peaked at number 91 on Billboard's Hot R&B/Hip-Hop Songs chart.

== Production and release ==
Sean Garrett and Polow da Don wrote and produced "Blindfold Me" for Kelis's fourth studio album Kelis Was Here (2006). Polow da Don is credited under his legal name Jamal Jones in the liner notes. In 2006 articles for Billboard and Vibe, music critics cited Polow da Don's work on "Blindfold Me" as part of his rising popularity as a record producer. Kelis recruited new producers for Kelis Was Here, including Garrett and Polow da Don, after separating from long-time collaborators the Neptunes. She had worked with the duo since her debut studio album Kaleidoscope in 1999, and was their "diva of choice" to sing hooks on other artists' songs. In a 2020 interview, Kelis said her collaboration with other producers for her third studio album caused a rift in their professional relationship.

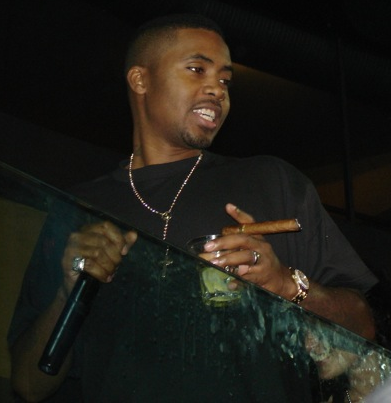
Nas (pictured in 2007) was featured on the "Blindfold Me" remix, and appears in its music video.

A remix for "Blindfold Me" includes a verse written and performed by Kelis's husband Nas. They had collaborated on four other songs: "Hey Nas" (2002), "Popular Thug" (2003), "In Public" (2005), and "Not Going Back" (2006). The remix was promoted as the single; it was included on some releases of Kelis Was Here, while other editions of the album had the original solo version. Garrett said he enjoyed working with his idol Nas, saying it was: "like a dream come true. Being able to meet these people and interact with them and have them respect your craft has been great." "Blindfold Me" was recorded by Doug Wilson at the Westlake Recording Studios in West Hollywood and the Battery Studios in New York City. Brian Stanley mixed the track, with assistance from Mike Makowski, at the Chung King Studios in New York City.

In September 2006, Jive and LaFace released "Blindfold Me" in the US as the second single from Kelis Was Here. A 12-inch single was released on vinyl on October 3, 2006; it includes instrumental and a cappella versions of the song, as well as two callout hooks. The single was sent to rhythmic radio a week later on October 10, 2006. "Blindfold Me" peaked at number 91 on the Hot R&B/Hip-Hop Songs Billboard chart dated November 11, 2006. Despite being released as a single, "Blindfold Me" was not included on Kelis's 2008 compilation album The Hits, which was criticized by AllMusic's Andy Kellman.

The music video for "Blindfold Me" was directed by Marc Klasfeld, who also shot the videos for the other Kelis Was Here singles, "Bossy" and "Lil Star". Filmed in Los Angeles in September 2006, it features Nas tying up Kelis. Scenes include Nas taking Kelis from a parking lot and using a black panther as part of foreplay. The video premiered on the documentary series Access Granted on September 6, 2006, along with a behind-the-scenes feature. Media outlets commented that the music video was about sexual fetishism, and Yahoo!'s Lyndsey Parker included it on her 2018 listicle of the kinkiest music videos of all time. Parker, as well as another Yahoo! contributor, praised the chemistry between Kelis and Nas. On the other hand, in a 2013 Vibe article, Desire Thompson criticized the video as unsuccessfully attempting to be sexy.

== Music and lyrics ==
"Blindfold Me"
The instrumental for "Blindfold Me" features sirens, which are often used in Polow da Don's productions, as well as synthesizers, synth horns, and drums.

"Blindfold Me" is a three-minute, 48-second hip hop song. While writing for The New York Times, Kelefa Sanneh further defined it, along with "Bossy", as "space-age hip-hop". In a Billboard review for "Blindfold Me", Clover Hope discussed it as part of the magazine's R&B category; however, during a separate article, she referred to the single as pop rap. Along with these hip hop associations, music journalists connected the song's overall style with club music.

The instrumental includes synthesizers, synth horns, sirens, and drums. A contributor for Rap-Up wrote that sirens are often featured in Polow da Don's productions. However, in Entertainment Weekly, Clark Collis said "Blindfold Me" sounded like music produced by Timbaland. MTV News's Doreen St. Félix said the track had a "skeletal beat", while Hope described its composition as having a "tick-tock percussion".

The lyrics focus on sex talk. Music critics focused on this sexually explicit content, which is demonstrated in the line: "He refused to take a bite before I put my blindfold on." The Associated Press's Brett Johnson characterized the single as a "naughty bedroom romp", and the CanWest News Service critic T'Cha Dunlevy wrote that the lyrics are full of "bootylicious taunts". Critics compared "Blindfold Me" to Kelis's 2003 single "Milkshake", including St. Félix who said it was "more sexually literal". Hope likened Kelis's vocal style to panting, and Clark Collis said she has a husky voice. While describing Kelis's vocals as a "half-rapping/half-singing affair", Hope wrote that Nas provides "his own kinky quips" for the remix.

== Critical reception ==
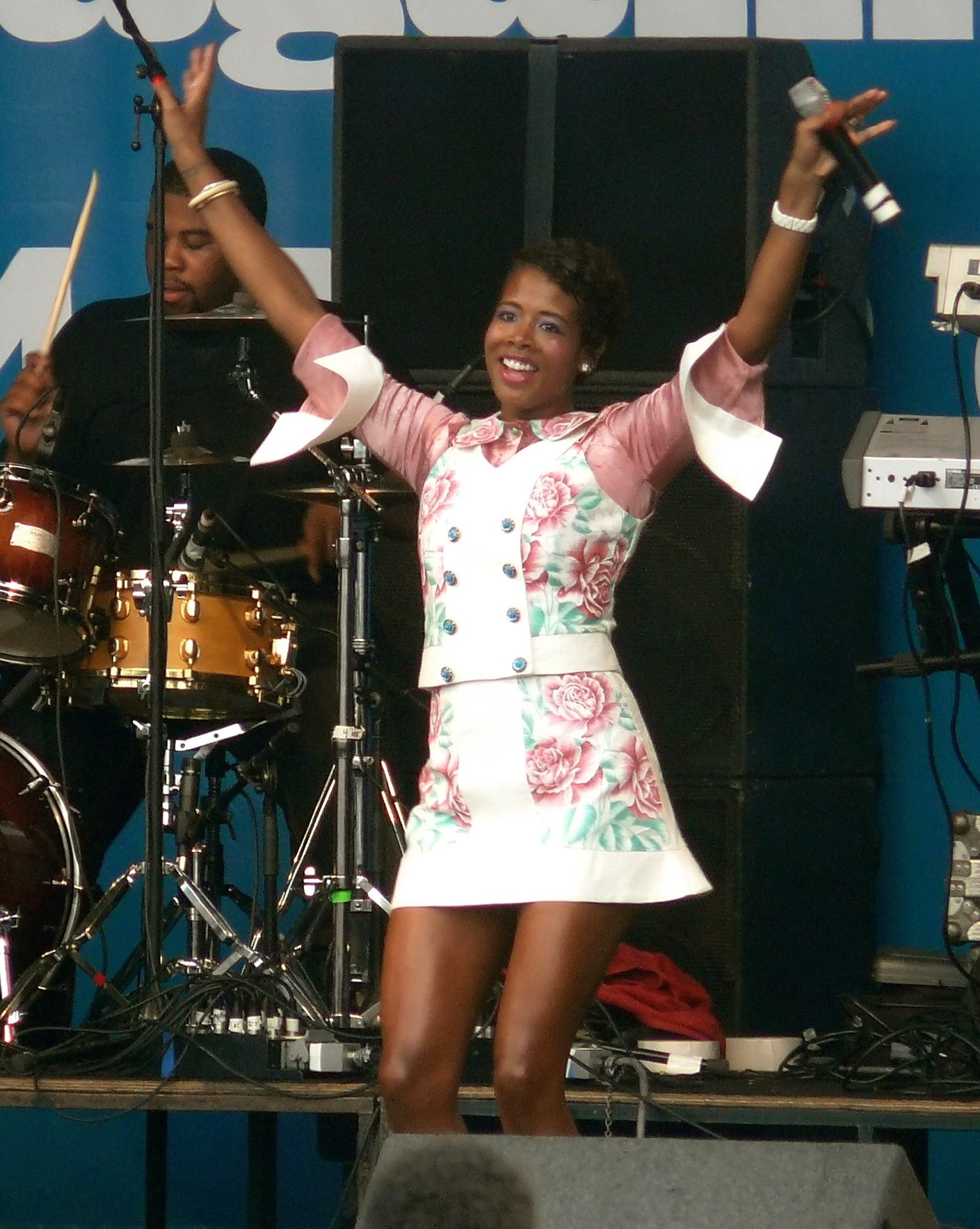
Some critics praised how "Blindfold Me" represented Kelis (pictured in 2007) and her sexual personality.

"Blindfold Me" was cited by several critics as a highlight from Kelis Was Here. Slant Magazine's Jonathan Keefe named it one of the best singles of 2006, humorously writing that Kelis and Nas singing about erotic asphyxiation and mummification would be enjoyable if those lyrics were coupled with a beat as good as "Blindfold Me". In a 2012 Complex listicle, Lauren Nostro described "Blindfold Me" as one of Sean Garrett's "classic records". Despite being critical of Kelis's rapping on the album, PopMatters' Quentin B. Huff spotlighted "Blindfold Me" and "Aww Shit!" as instances where she "excels with her rhyme schemes". Steve Hands of musicOMH encouraged his readers to listen to both songs multiple times to understand "the subtle lights behind the braggy bushels".

Some critics praised the song for showcasing Kelis's sexual personality. Clark Collis described it as the "perfect launchpad for the singer’s sex-object-on-her-own-terms persona". In the Associated Press, Brett Johnson said "Blindfold Me" fit with Kelis's attitude, writing: "Few songstresses can match her hot-blooded sneer." While referring to the single as "urgent and almost crude", Tim Finney for Pitchfork identified it as the moment in which Kelis was at "her most brazenly confronting".

Hope and Stylus Magazine's Mallory O'Donnell disliked the remix, criticizing the lyrics as uncomfortably voyeuristic into Kelis's sex life with Nas. O'Donnell dismissed the single as a "rote club-banger", and Hope questioned its commercial viability, saying "it is hard to see it getting much airplay outside the sweaty confines of the clubs". In New York magazine, Sia Michel panned "Blindfold Me" as a failed attempt to recapture past success, finding it "far less catchy and witty" than "Milkshake".

Several reviewers were critical of the placement of "Blindfold Me" on the album's track listing, considering it a jarring shift after the more sentimental "Living Proof". Andy Kellman disliked the choice to go from "Blindfold Me", which he described as having an "anthemic kink", to a ballad like "Goodbyes". Despite these negative reviews for the track listing, some critics attributed the album's tonal shifts to Kelis's artistic versatility. Writing for the Los Angeles Times, Ann Powers said "few artists could line up an ode to bondage right next to a love song so sweet that it could be played at a wedding".

== Track listing ==
12" single
No.	Title	Length
1.	"Blindfold Me" (Main)	4:20
2.	"Blindfold Me" (Instrumental)	4:21
3.	"Blindfold Me" (Main)	4:20
4.	"Blindfold Me" (Acappella)	3:58

== Credits and personnel ==
Credits are adapted from the liner notes of Kelis Was Here:

=== Recording locations ===
- Recorded at Westlake Recording Studios in West Hollywood and the Battery Studios in New York City
- Mixed at the Chung King Studios in New York City

=== Personnel ===
- Kelis – primary artist
- Nas – featured artist, writer
- Brian Stanley – mixing
- Mike Makowski – mixing
- Polow da Don – writer, producer
- Sean Garrett – writer, producer
- Brian Sumner – recording
- Doug Wilson – recording

== Charts ==
Chart (2006)	Peak position
US Hot R&B/Hip-Hop Songs (Billboard)	91

== Release history ==
Region	Date	Format	Label	Ref.
United States	October 3, 2006	12-inch vinyl	Jive	
United States	October 10, 2006	Rhythmic contemporary radio	Jive	
