= Smokefree RockQuest 2005 =

Compilation album by Various artists
- Released: September 22, 2005
- Recorded: 2005
- Genre: Rock
- Label: Warner Music

Smokefree RockQuest 2005 is a compilation album featuring the finalists from the 2005 high school "battle of the bands" Rockquest held annually in New Zealand. This event was held in the Wellington Town Hall on Saturday 3 September 2005.

The judges of this year's event were Anika Moa, Willy McAlistair from The Edge, Tania Deans from NZ on Air, Matt Headland from Warner Music and music producer Malcolm Welsford.

The Electric Confectionaires won the 2005 Smokefreerockquest. Its members from Auckland's Takapuna Grammar were Haddon Smith (keyboard), Jaisi Sheehan (lead guitar and vocals), Rob Fenton (drums) and Calum Gunn (bass guitarist). At the time of the event they had been together only about three months.

Their prizes included:

- Vouchers for musical equipment to the value of $10,000 from NZ Rock Shops and other suppliers
- Recording a song at York St Studio
- Air play on The Edge
- A NZ On Air grant to produce a music video.

Second place went to another North Shore band, Midnight Youth from Rangitoto College in Mairangi Bay, who received the Rockquest Promotions Best Song Award, worth $500.

Third place was The Legions of Sound from Wanganui High School.

== Track listing ==
1. All My Love by The Electric Confectionaires
2. Turn The Page by Legions Of Sound
3. Friday Conversation by Midnight Youth
4. Singing With You by Maenad
5. Burning by Rival State
6. Kate by Eight Orange Orchard
7. Mrs Julian Casablancas by Priya
8. Part Two: The Execution by Cathedra
9. Let it Rain by The 44th Calibre
10. The Better Tones by The Henderson Experience
11. Thoughtful Escape by Kimbra

== See also ==
- Rockquest
