= Bossy (Kelis song) =

2006 single by Kelis

Single by Kelis featuring Too Short

from the album Kelis Was Here
- Released: April 3, 2006
- Studio: Sony Music, Battery (New York City); Blue Basement Recordings (Atlanta, Georgia)
- Genre: Hip-hop
- Length: 4:34
- Label: Jive; Virgin
- Songwriters: Kelis Rogers-Jones; Shondrae Crawford; Todd Shaw; Sean Garrett
- Producer: Bangladesh

Kelis singles chronology
"In Public" (2005)	"Bossy" (2006)	"I Love My Chick" (2006)

Kelis North American singles chronology
"Milkshake" (2003)	"Bossy" (2006)	"I Love My Chick" (2006)

Kelis European singles chronology
"In Public" (2005)	"Bossy" (2006)	"Lil Star" (2007)

Too Short singles chronology
"Blow the Whistle" (2006)	"Bossy" (2006)

"Bossy" is a song by American R&B singer Kelis featuring American rapper Too Short. The song features a Roland 808 drum machine and interpolates "Diamonds on My Neck" by Smitty, which in turn uses a sample of "Dangerous MC's" by The Notorious B.I.G. "Bossy" was released in the United States in April 2006 as the lead single from Kelis' fourth studio album, Kelis Was Here (2006). The song peaked at number 16 on the US Billboard Hot 100, making it the singer's second-biggest Hot 100 hit as well as Too Short's first top-40 hit. "Bossy" also entered the top 10 in Finland and the top 20 in Australia, New Zealand, and Spain. On December 11, 2006, the song was certified double platinum by the Recording Industry Association of America (RIAA).

== Chart performance ==
"Bossy" debuted on the US Billboard Hot 100 in early 2006 and peaked at number 16 on August 5, 2006, becoming her third Hot 100 entry and her second biggest hit after 2003's "Milkshake". The song entered several other Billboard charts, including the Hot R&B/Hip-Hop Songs chart, on which it peaked at number 11.

In the United Kingdom, the single was released on September 4, 2006, and peaked at number 22, a lower position than those reached by the four singles from Kelis' previous album, Tasty. "Bossy" was released in Australia the same day, returning Kelis to the top 20, where it peaked at number 18. The song fared better on the R&B charts of Australia and the UK, reaching numbers four and seven, respectively.

"Bossy" reached the top 10 in Finland, the top 20 in Spain and New Zealand, and the top 40 in Ireland. The single also peaked at number 41 in Belgium and Switzerland, number 56 in Austria, and number 64 in Germany.

== Music video ==
The video for "Bossy", directed by Marc Klasfeld—who would work with Kelis on "Blindfold Me" and "Lil Star" later that year—and produced by Rockhard Films, was shot in February 2006 in Los Angeles, California.

The video presents Kelis in different scenarios and outfits, depicting an atmosphere from an upper-class world: from a diamond-filled party to a red Enzo Ferrari drive out in the night. It premiered on BET on April 24, 2006.

== Charts ==
=== Weekly charts ===
Chart (2006)	Peak position
Australia (ARIA)	18
Australian Urban (ARIA)	6
Austria (Ö3 Austria Top 40)	56
Belgium (Ultratop 50 Flanders)	41
Belgium (Ultratip Bubbling Under Wallonia)	3
Canada CHR/Top 40 (Billboard)	34
CIS Airplay (TopHit)	65
Finland (Suomen virallinen lista)	8
Germany (GfK)	64
Global Dance Songs (Billboard)	16
Ireland (IRMA)	21
Netherlands (Single Top 100)	72
New Zealand (Recorded Music NZ)	15
Russia Airplay (TopHit)	60
Scottish Singles Sales (Official Charts)	22
Spain (Promusicae)	20
Sweden (Sverigetopplistan)	39
Switzerland (Schweizer Hitparade)	41
Ukraine Airplay (TopHit)	186
UK Singles (Official Charts)	22
UK Hip Hop/R&B (Official Charts)	7
US Billboard Hot 100	16
US Dance Club Songs (Billboard)	24
US Hot R&B/Hip-Hop Songs (Billboard)	11
US Pop Airplay (Billboard)	20
US Rhythmic Airplay (Billboard)	8

=== Year-end charts ===
Chart (2006)	Position
UK Urban (Music Week)	18
US Billboard Hot 100	64
US Hot R&B/Hip-Hop Songs (Billboard)	52
US Rhythmic (Billboard)	39

== Certifications ==
Region	Certification	Certified units/sales
Canada (Music Canada) Ringtone	Platinum	40,000^{*}
New Zealand (RMNZ)	Gold	15,000^{‡}
United States (RIAA) Mastertone	2× Platinum	2,000,000^{*}
^{*} Sales figures based on certification alone.^{‡} Sales+streaming figures based on certification alone.

== Release history ==
Region	Date	Format	Label	Ref.
United States	April 3, 2006	Rhythmic contemporary radio	Jive	
Australia	September 4, 2006	CD	Virgin	
United Kingdom	September 4, 2006	CD	Virgin	
