= Lil Star =

- UK CD 1 cover

Single by Kelis featuring Cee-Lo

from the album Kelis Was Here
- B-side: "80's Joint"
- Released: February 19, 2007
- Recorded: 2006
- Studio: Doppler (Atlanta, Georgia)
- Genre: Pop; R&B; soul
- Length: 4:55
- Label: Virgin
- Songwriters: Kelis Rogers-Jones; Thomas Callaway
- Producer: Cee-Lo Green

Kelis singles chronology
"Blindfold Me" (2006)	"Lil Star" (2007)	"Acapella" (2010)

Cee-Lo singles chronology
"Politics" (2005)	"Lil Star" (2007)	"Chuch" (2007)

Alternative covers
- UK CD 2 cover

Alternative cover
- Digital cover

"Lil Star" is the second international single from Kelis' fourth studio album, Kelis Was Here (2006). Released outside US (where "Blindfold Me" served as the second single), the single features Cee-Lo, who was at the time half of the duo Gnarls Barkley. Following the moderate success of "Bossy", the single has proven to be a return to form for Kelis; it debuted at number eight in Ireland and was also a huge hit in the United Kingdom reaching number three on the UK Singles Chart. The track was hailed by many music fans and critics as Kelis' "comeback" single, despite the fact "Bossy" was written specifically for Kelis' return to music.

== Background and lyrics ==
"Lil Star" features Kelis singing about the times when she has self-doubt. "I can't be confident and bold and obnoxious all the time", Kelis says. "What kind of person would I be? I'm a human being and I have other sides, too. I'm not always secure and I'm not always confident. I have moments where I get self-conscious."

The song was tentatively set to be released on January 8, 2007, but to allow time for promotion the release date was pushed back to February 19. However, on January 8, the song was added to the C List of BBC Radio 1 Playlist, and has since been promoted to their A List, guaranteeing at least 20 plays a week.

The video for "Lil Star" was filmed by Marc Klasfeld, and has been on rotation since January 13, 2007 when it was added to British urban music channel MTV Base's videos roster.

"Lil Star" debuted on the UK Singles Chart at number 37 on January 28, 2007. The following week, high download sales enabled an 18-position jump to number 19. On February 12, 2007 "Lil Star" moved into the UK top 15 at the number-13 position. During its fourth week in the top 40, the song slid down two places to number 15. However, on February 26, 2007, in the fifth week on the UK chart it moved from number 15 to the top three. "Lil Star" landed at number three on the UK Singles Chart in the week of its physical release.

== Chart performance ==
"Lil Star" made its debut on the UK Singles Chart at number eighty-four on January 21, 2007 based on downloads alone five weeks before its release and climbed the charts rapidly to number thirty-seven within a matter of weeks due to strong download sales. Several weeks later it managed to make its initial peak at number thirteen based on downloads sales. After its official release it peaked at number three, becoming the first single from Kelis Was Here to reach the top three in the UK, and became Kelis' highest-charting single since 2004's "Millionaire". "Lil Star" also entered several other UK charts including the UK R&B Singles Chart where it peaked at number one, the UK Airplay Chart where it peaked at number three, the UK Official Download Chart where it reached number nine, and the UK iTunes Top 100 countdown where it peaked at number eleven. To date, "Lil Star" remains one of Kelis' best-selling singles in the UK where it sold over 118,000 copies. "Lil Star" also peaked at number eight in Ireland, her highest-peaking single since "Milkshake" back in 2003. "Lil Star" found similar success in Eastern Europe; it peaked at number four in Slovenia, number seven in Hungary, and number eighteen in Slovakia. Although "Lil Star" performed well in European countries such as the UK and Ireland, it became a commercial failure in Germany, peaking at number ninety-nine, Kelis' lowest-charting single there to date. "Lil Star" was to be released in Australia as the second single from Kelis Was Here, with its video having been aired on music programs around Australia, but for unknown reasons it did not happen and instead "I Don't Think So" was released.

== Music video ==
The video for "Lil Star" was filmed in Los Angeles in December 2006 and directed by Marc Klasfeld, who had previously worked with Kelis on "Bossy" and "Blindfold Me" earlier in 2006. In the video Kelis is walking down a street in a large space suit-style coat, then singing to the stars. The stars take the formation of Cee-Lo and Kelis as they both sing, all wrapped up in a very mellow and calm atmosphere, relating to the song's theme. It premiered on MTV UK on January 13, 2007.

== Track listings ==
UK CD 1

1. "Lil Star" (Radio Edit)
2. "80's Joint"

UK CD 2

1. "Lil Star" (Album Version)
2. "Lil Star" (Linus Loves Remix)
3. "Lil Star" (Soundboy Remix)
4. "Lil Star" (Future Cut Throw Back Mix)
5. "Lil Star" (Video)

12" single

- Side A:
1. "Lil Star" (Main)
2. "Lil Star" (Instrumental)
- Side B:
1. "Lil Star" (Main)
2. "Lil Star" (A Capella)

Promo remixes CD

1. "Lil Star" (Linus Loves Remix featuring Cee-Lo)
2. "Lil Star" (Linus Loves Dub featuring Cee-Lo)
3. "Lil Star" (Future Cut Remix featuring Cee-Lo)
4. "Lil Star" (Soundbwoy Remix featuring Cee-Lo)
5. "Lil Star" (Soundbwoy Instrumental)
6. "Lil Star" (Al Usher 12" Mix featuring Cee-Lo)

== Charts ==
=== Weekly charts ===
Chart (2007)	Peak position
CIS Airplay (TopHit)	61
Czech Republic Airplay (ČNS IFPI)	69
Europe (European Hot 100 Singles)	12
Germany (GfK)	99
Hungary (Rádiós Top 40)	7
Ireland (IRMA)	8
Romania (Romanian Top 100)	25
Scotland Singles (Official Charts)	4
Slovakia Airplay (ČNS IFPI)	18
UK Singles (Official Charts)	3
UK Hip Hop/R&B (Official Charts)	1

=== Year-end charts ===
Chart (2007)	Position
Hungary (Rádiós Top 40)	12
UK Singles (OCC)	61
