= Smokefreerockquest =

New Zealand annual music competition

- Sponsored by: Smokefree/Auahi Kore
- Country: New Zealand
- First award: 1988
- Website: smokefreerockquest.co.nz

Smokefreerockquest (SFRQ) is an annual music competition for intermediate and high school bands throughout New Zealand.

The first Rockquest was held in 1988, and was organised by Christchurch radio station C93FM as a local event. The following year, local sound company owner Mike Waldegrave, Music promoter Barb Cuttance and school teachers Glenn Common and Pete Rainey formed Rockquest Promotions and by 1990 had made Rockquest a national event, with five regional finals and a national final. In 1991, Smokefree became a major sponsor, and the name became the Smokefreerockquest. Glenn Common and Pete Rainey now run Rockquest Promotions full-time out of Nelson.

Smokefreerockquest reaches audience numbers in excess of 24,000. Its aim is to motivate young musicians to prove their musical ability and to encourage their peers to support original New Zealand music. Initially bands played covers, but very early in the evolution of the event (and running parallel with the evolution of music in New Zealand) there was a shift to original music.

Musical successes from Smokefreerockquest include, Midnight Youth, Opshop, Evermore, Ladyhawke, Kids of 88, Die!Die!Die!, Ivy Lies, Cairo Knife Fight, Cut Off Your Hands, the Datsuns, Zed, Brooke Fraser, Anika Moa, Anna Coddington, The Electric Confectionaires, Steriogram, Aaradhna, Spacifix, The Phoenix Foundation, The Feelers, The Black Seeds, Nesian Mystik, Bic Runga, The Checks, Julia Deans, King Kapisi, Kingston, The Naked and Famous, Rival State, Autozamm, Taste Nasa, Kimbra, Elemeno P, and Alien Weaponry.

== Competition format ==
The SFRQ consists of around 40 regional competitions across New Zealand with the top regional bands progressing to the national final.

Each region holds both heats and a regional final. Acts that place first or second in each category (Solo-duo or Band) at their regional event have the opportunity to submit a 12-minute performance video which is judged by a panel of industry professionals. From these video submissions, 10 acts are chosen to compete at the national final. At the national final, the competing bands have 8 minutes to perform on stage before the overall winner is announced.

The regional areas are: Northland, North Shore, Auckland Central, Manukau, Waikato, Bay of Plenty, Rotorua, Taranaki, Whanganui, East Coast, Hawkes Bay, Manawatu, Wairarapa, Wellington, Nelson, Marlborough District, Canterbury, West Coast, Timaru, Otago and Southland.

== Prize package ==
The overall national winners (Band and Solo-duo) receive a prizepack which includes the opportunity to record a single, musical gear from NZ Rockshops, a New Music Single grant funded by NZ On Air which allows the act for have a music video created and released professionally, and mentoring with a music industry professional. Second and third-placed finishers also receive Rockshop vouchers and the opportunity to record a single. Other awards at regional events include second and third placings, ZM Best Song Award, APRA Lyric Award, ZM People's Choice Award, Musicianship Award, and Best Vocals Award.

== Past winners ==
| Year | Winner | School | Region | Ref. |
|---|---|---|---|---|
| 1989 | Outer Control | Hornby High School | Christchurch | |
| 1990 | De Funk Express | Hillmorton High School | Christchurch | |
| 1991 | Auntie Beatrice | Whakatane High School | Whakatane | |
| 1992 | Exploding Poppies | Waimea College | Nelson | |
| 1993 | Hallucian | Selwyn College | Auckland | |
| 1994 | Kate in the Lemon Tree | Wanganui Collegiate | Wanganui | |
| 1995 | Dancing Azians | Karamu High School | Hawkes Bay | |
| 1996 | Marystaple | Aotea College | Wellington | |
| 1997 | Atlas Woods | Wairarapa College/Kuranui College | Wellington | |
| 1998 | Handsome Geoffrey | Hamilton Girls' High School | Waikato | |
| 1999 | Son of Spank | Kāpiti College/Tawa College | Wellington | |
| 2000 | Evermore | "Twin Oaks School" (Note: Because Evermore were homeschooled, they made up "Twin Oaks School" as their school name.) | Manawatu | |
| 2001 | Carriage H | Logan Park High School | Otago | |
| 2002 | The Have | Wanganui High School | Wanganui | |
| 2003 | Falter | Mairehau High School | Christchurch | |
| 2004 | Incursa | St Peters College | Auckland | |
| 2005 | The Electric Confectionaires | Takapuna Grammar School | North Shore | |
| 2006 | Neil Robinson | Unlimited Paenga Tawhiti | Christchurch | |
| 2007 | Solomon | Rangitoto College | North Shore | |
| 2008 | Beneath the Silence | Cashmere High School/Kaiapoi High School/Rangiora High School | Christchurch | |
| 2009 | Jesse Sheehan | Wellington College | Wellington | |
| 2010 | The Good Fun | Te Awamutu College & Hamilton Boys' High School | Waikato | |
| 2011 | The Peasants | Garin College | Nelson | |
| 2012 | New Vinyl | Nelson College | Nelson | |
| 2013 | A Bit Nigel (band) | Taupo-nui-a-Tia College & Rotorua Boys' High School | Rotorua-Taupo | |
| 2013 | Harry Parsons (solo/duo) | Cambridge High School, New Zealand | Waikato | |
| 2014 | Head Chef (band) | Wellington High School | Wellington | |
| 2014 | Georgia Lines (solo/duo) | Bethlehem College | Bay of Plenty | |
| 2015 | Joe's Van (band) | Mount Maunganui College | Bay of Plenty | |
| 2015 | Ben Mollison (solo/duo) | Bethlehem College | Bay of Plenty | |
| 2016 | Alien Weaponry (band) | Bream Bay College & Otamatea High School | Northland | |
| 2016 | Iris G (solo/duo) | Avondale College | Auckland Central | |
| 2017 | Minimal Silence (band) | Howick College | Manukau | |
| 2017 | Sonatane Kaufusi (solo/duo) | Manurewa High School | Manukau | |
| 2018 | Mit Eldnar (band) | Manurewa High School | Manukau | |
| 2018 | Estella Romagnoli (solo/duo) | Nelson College for Girls | Nelson | |
| 2019 | Arlo Mac (band) | Havelock North High School | Hawkes Bay | |
| 2019 | There's a Tuesday (solo/duo) | Christchurch Girls' High School & St Margaret's College | Christchurch | |
| 2020 | Red Wav (band) | Aorere College & Marcellin College | Manukau | |
| 2020 | Ben & Brody (solo/duo) | Rangitoto College | North Shore | |
| 2021 | Cancelled because of COVID-19 | | | |
| 2022 | Smoked Paprika (band) | Hillcrest High School | Waikato | |
| 2022 | Zac & Maddison (solo/duo) | Garin College & Waimea College | Nelson | |
| 2023 | Parkdale (band) | Mount Albert Grammar School & Selwyn College, Auckland | Auckland Central | |
| 2023 | Salem Randell (solo/duo) | Gisborne Boys' High School | Tairāwhiti | |
| 2024 | Top Shelf (band) | Manurewa High School | Manukau | |
| 2024 | Emerson (solo/duo) | Te Aho o Te Kura Pounamu | Auckland Central | |
| 2025 | Equilibrium (band) | Burnside High School | Christchurch | |
| 2025 | Sahara (solo/duo) | Cambridge High School | Waikato | |
| 2026 | Fork (band) | Bream Bay College | Northland | |
| 2026 | Lily Moore (solo/duo) | Havelock North High School | Hawkes Bay | |

== Post-event successes ==
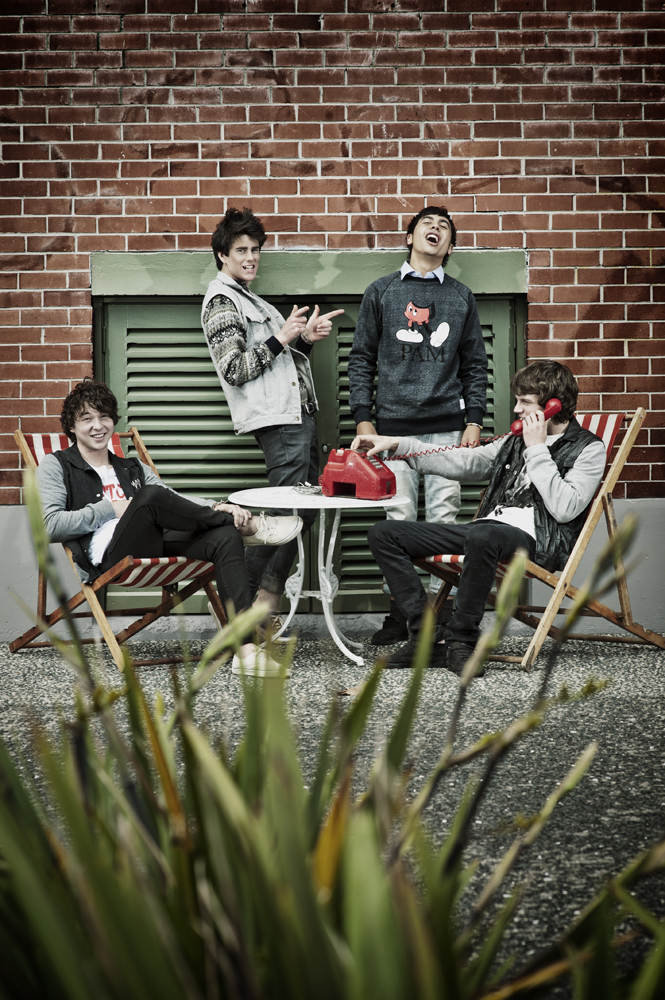
The Good Fun

- 1989/1990 — Bobby Kennedy and Clint Harris, members from the 1989 winning band Outer Control, formed the popular New Zealand rock band Opshop with Jason Kerrison, whose band De Funk Express won the Rockquest in 1990.
- 1991 — 1991 winners, Auntie Beatrice, featured brothers Bradley, Laughton and Francis Kora who later formed Reggae/dub band Kora. Kora's debut EP Volume was released in 2004 and achieved platinum status with over 10,000 copies sold.
- 1993 — Pagan Records signed Bic Runga directly after her Rockquest national final performance, and she was subsequently signed to Sony for international release. Runga's first solo album, Drive, debuted at number one on the New Zealand RIANZ charts. She has since become one of the highest-selling New Zealand artists, also finding success internationally in Australia, Ireland and the UK.
- 1998 — In 1998, Atlantic Records signed Anika Moa directly after her national final performance. Moa's 2001 debut album, Thinking Room, reached the top of the Official New Zealand Top 40 Albums Chart and was a commercial success. She has released a total of four studio albums and has received numerous APRA and New Zealand Music Award nominations.
- 2000 — Evermore have gone on to international success since winning the competition in 2000. The band used their Rockquest prize money to build their own recording facility, Red Sky Studio. They have since released four popular albums and have been nominated for numerous ARIA Awards and New Zealand Music Awards.
- 2001 — Andrew Wilson and Michael Prain of Die! Die! Die! originally played in the band Carriage H who won the SFRQ in 2001. As well as releasing five studio albums, Die! Die! Die! have toured with Franz Ferdinand, Wolfmother and Wire.
- 2004 — Sam McCarthy and Jordan Arts, members of the 2004 winning band Insurca, formed the new wave duo, Kids of 88 who released two albums. McCarthy also played in pop punk band Goodnight Nurse who released several top 40 singles.
- 2014 — Georgia and Caleb Nott, members of The Peasants (2011 SFRQ winners), splintered off to form the duo Broods. They have released two albums and have enjoyed some success in the United States.
- 2016 — Alien Weaponry have won a New Zealand 2022 Music Award for Best Rock Act, opened for Guns N' Roses and released 2 studio albums.

== See also ==
- Smokefree RockQuest 2005 - an album of the finalists of 2005.
