= Our Song (Goodnight Nurse song) =

Single by Goodnight Nurse

from the album Always and Never
- Released: 2005
- Recorded: 2005
- Genre: Rock
- Label: FMR
- Songwriters: Joel Little; Jaden Parkes; Paul Taite

Goodnight Nurse singles chronology
"Going Away" (2005)	"Our Song" (2005)	"My Only" (2006)

"Our Song" is a song from Goodnight Nurse's debut studio album, Always and Never. It was released in 2005 as the fourth single from the album. It is their strongest charting single to date, peaking at number fifteen on the RIANZ charts in New Zealand.

The single featured a rock cover of "Milkshake" by Kelis.

During Big Day Out 2007 and at numerous other performances, Goodnight Nurse mentioned "Our Song" was written about the lead singer's deceased grandfather.

== Track listings ==
1. "Our Song" - 3:52
2. "Milkshake" - 2:28

== Charts ==
Chart	Peak position
RIANZ Singles Chart	15
