= Trick Me =

2004 single by Kelis

Single by Kelis

from the album Tasty
- Released: February 17, 2004
- Studio: DARP (Atlanta, Georgia); O'Henry (Burbank, California); Chalice (Hollywood, California)
- Genre: Funk; reggae; ska
- Length: 3:26
- Label: Star Trak; Arista
- Songwriter: Dallas Austin
- Producer: Dallas Austin

Kelis singles chronology
"Not in Love" (2004)	"Trick Me" (2004)	"Millionaire" (2004)

"Trick Me" is a song by American singer Kelis from her third studio album, Tasty (2003). It was written and produced by Dallas Austin. The song was released as the album's second single on February 17, 2004. "Trick Me" was not released in the United States as her American label, Arista, folded after the release of Tasty, and she was transferred to Jive. In Europe, she was still on the same label, Virgin.

The song received praise from critics. Internationally, "Trick Me" achieved similar chart success to that of "Milkshake". The single topped the charts in Hungary and Romania, and peaked inside the top five in the United Kingdom, New Zealand, and Australia, among other countries. It was certified platinum by the Australian Recording Industry Association (ARIA) and gold by the Recording Industry Association of New Zealand (RIANZ).

== Background and release ==
"Trick Me" was written and produced by Dallas Austin. Recording sessions took place at DARP Studios in Atlanta, Georgia; O'Henry Studios in Burbank, California; and Chalice Studios in Hollywood, California. Background vocals and guitar were provided by Tony Reyes, and the recordings were mixed by Kevin Davis at Larabee North in North Hollywood, California.

"In Public" featuring Nas was originally chosen to be released as the second single from Tasty, but MTV News reported in late January 2004 that "Trick Me" would be released instead. "In Public" was eventually released as the fourth single in April 2005. The single was not released in the United States as Kelis' label, Arista, folded just when Tasty was released in December 2003; as a result, no more singles were released there after "Milkshake". Nevertheless, "Trick Me" was sent to rhythmic contemporary and urban contemporary radio stations in the US on February 17, 2004. In Europe, however, Kelis was still on the same label, Virgin, so singles continued to be released there.

== Music video ==
The music video for "Trick Me" was directed by Mr. X and shot in the Toronto suburb of Scarborough on April 15, 2004.

== Reception ==
=== Critical response ===
"Trick Me"
A 20-second sample of "Trick Me"

"Trick Me" was well received by contemporary music critics. Tony Naylor of NME referred to the track as "a wonderful computer-processed reggae romp". Pitchfork reviewer Scott Plagenhoef felt that "Dallas Austin punches above his weight with 'Trick Me', on which Kelis advises to 'call the police/ There's a madwoman in town,' over a skanking, slightly echoed guitar." Blender's Joseph Patel described the song as a "crackling funk ditty", and Neil Drumming of Entertainment Weekly called it "a blistering sawtooth skank". The Independent wrote that the song's "sprightly canter" is "particularly irresistible".

=== Commercial performance ===
Despite not being released commercially in the United States, "Trick Me" managed to reach number seven on the Bubbling Under R&B/Hip-Hop Singles chart in April 2004. The song debuted at number two on the UK Singles Chart behind Frankee's "F.U.R.B. (Fuck You Right Back)", earning Kelis her second consecutive top-five entry. "Trick Me" debuted on the Irish Singles Chart at number eight for the week ending May 27, 2004, the week's highest debut. It peaked at number four two weeks later.

"Trick Me" found similar success in continental Europe, outpeaking "Milkshake" in Austria, Belgium, France, Germany, Italy, the Netherlands, and Switzerland—although "Trick Me" peaked at number five on the European Hot 100 Singles, while "Milkshake" reached number three. The single also reached number one in Hungary and Romania, the top five in Norway, and the top 10 in Denmark. Additionally, "Trick Me" has become Kelis' highest-peaking solo single in Germany, France, Italy, and Switzerland.

The single debuted and peaked at number five on the ARIA Singles Chart for four non-consecutive weeks, becoming Kelis' second top-five single in Australia. The Australian Recording Industry Association (ARIA) certified it platinum, denoting shipments in excess of 70,000 copies. In New Zealand, "Trick Me" debuted at number seven on the RIANZ Singles Chart, before peaking at number three in July 2004, tying with "Milkshake" as Kelis' highest-peaking single on the chart. The track was certified gold by the Recording Industry Association of New Zealand (RIANZ) the following month for sales of 7,500 copies.

== Track listings ==
- UK CD 1 and German CD single
1. "Trick Me" (album version) – 3:26
2. "Milkshake" (remix) (featuring Pharrell and Pusha T from Clipse) – 4:45
- UK CD 2, Australian CD single, and digital EP
1. "Trick Me" (album version) – 3:26
2. "Trick Me" (Mac & Toolz Extended Remix) – 4:31
3. "Trick Me" (Artificial Intelligence Remix) – 5:54
4. "Trick Me" (Adam Freeland Remix) – 7:27
5. "Trick Me" (E-Smoove House Trick) – 7:42
- UK 12-inch single

A1. "Trick Me" (album version) – 3:26
A2. "Trick Me" (Mac & Toolz Extended Remix) – 4:31
B1. "Trick Me" (Artificial Intelligence Remix) – 5:54
B1. "Trick Me" (Adam Freeland Remix) – 7:27

- Digital single
1. "Trick Me" – 3:26

== Credits and personnel ==
Credits adapted from the liner notes of Tasty.

=== Recording ===
- Recorded at DARP Studios (Atlanta, Georgia), O'Henry Studios (Burbank, California), and Chalice Studios (Hollywood, California)
- Mixed at Larabee North (North Hollywood, California)
- Mastered at Sterling Sound (New York City)

=== Personnel ===
- Kelis – vocals
- Dallas Austin – production, arrangement
- Rick Sheppard – recording
- Carlton Lynn – recording
- Doug Harms – recording assistance
- Cesar Guevara – recording assistance
- Kevin "KD" Davis – mixing
- Tony Reyes – guitar, background vocals
- Greg "Ruckus" Andrews – DJ
- Chris Athens – mastering

== Charts ==
=== Weekly charts ===
Weekly chart performance for "Trick Me"
Chart (2004)	Peak position
Australia (ARIA)	5
Australian Urban (ARIA)	3
Austria (Ö3 Austria Top 40)	6
Belgium (Ultratop 50 Flanders)	8
Belgium (Ultratop 50 Wallonia)	18
CIS Airplay (TopHit)	4
CIS Airplay (TopHit) E-Smoove Trick radio edit remix	135
Croatia International (HRT)	2
Czech Republic (IFPI)	1
Denmark (Tracklisten)	7
Europe (European Hot 100 Singles)	5
France (SNEP)	20
Germany (GfK)	10
Greece (IFPI)	19
Hungary (Rádiós Top 40)	30
Hungary (Single Top 40)	1
Hungary (Dance Top 40)	1
Ireland (IRMA)	4
Italy (FIMI)	9
Netherlands (Dutch Top 40)	3
Netherlands (Single Top 100)	4
New Zealand (Recorded Music NZ)	3
Norway (VG-lista)	5
Poland (Polish Airplay Charts)	21
Romania (Romanian Top 100)	1
Russia Airplay (TopHit)	5
Russia Airplay (TopHit) E-Smoove Trick radio edit remix	126
Scotland Singles (OCC)	3
Sweden (Sverigetopplistan)	24
Switzerland (Schweizer Hitparade)	8
UK Singles (OCC)	2
UK Hip Hop/R&B (OCC)	1
Ukraine Airplay (TopHit)	3
Ukraine Airplay (TopHit) E-Smoove Trick radio edit remix	82
US Bubbling Under R&B/Hip-Hop Songs (Billboard)	7
US Rhythmic Airplay (Billboard)	37

=== Year-end charts ===
2004 year-end chart performance for "Trick Me"
Chart (2004)	Position
Australia (ARIA)	33
Australian Urban (ARIA)	11
Austria (Ö3 Austria Top 40)	34
Belgium (Ultratop 50 Flanders)	49
Belgium (Ultratop 50 Wallonia)	70
CIS Airplay (TopHit)	24
Croatia International Airplay (HRT)	5
France (SNEP)	94
Germany (Media Control GfK)	36
Hungary (Rádiós Top 40)	55
Netherlands (Dutch Top 40)	21
Netherlands (Single Top 100)	24
New Zealand (RIANZ)	25
Russia Airplay (TopHit)	21
Switzerland (Schweizer Hitparade)	47
UK Singles (OCC)	33
Ukraine Airplay (TopHit)	46

2005 year-end chart performance for "Trick Me"
Chart (2005)	Position
Romania (Romanian Top 100)	71

== Certifications and sales ==
Certifications and sales for "Trick Me"
Region	Certification	Certified units/sales
Australia (ARIA)	Platinum	70,000^{^}
France	—	77,885
Germany (BVMI)	Gold	150,000^{‡}
New Zealand (RMNZ)	Platinum	30,000^{‡}
United Kingdom (BPI)	Gold	400,000^{‡}
^{^} Shipments figures based on certification alone.^{‡} Sales+streaming figures based on certification alone.

== Release history ==
Region	Date	Format	Label	Ref(s)
United States	February 17, 2004	Rhythmic and urban radio	Star Trak; Arista	
Russia	March 30, 2004	Contemporary hit radio	Gala Records; EMI	
Australia	April 19, 2004	Digital download	EMI	
Germany	April 19, 2004	Digital download	EMI	
United Kingdom	April 19, 2004	Digital download	Virgin	
Germany	May 24, 2004	CD single; digital EP	EMI	
United Kingdom	May 24, 2004	CD single; digital EP; 12-inch single	Virgin	
Australia	May 31, 2004	CD single	EMI	

== See also ==
- List of Romanian Top 100 number ones of the 2000s
