= Kelis Was Here =

2006 studio album by Kelis

Studio album by Kelis
- Released: August 22, 2006
- Recorded: October 2004 – June 2006
- Studios: Sony Music (New York City) (Note: Tracks 2 and 11); Battery (New York City) (Note: Tracks 2, 6 and 11); Blue Basement (Atlanta) (Note: Track 2); Record Plant (Hollywood) (Note: Tracks 3 and 10); Glenwood Place (Burbank) (Note: Tracks 3, 4, 10 and 17); Blakeslee (North Hollywood) (Note: Tracks 5 and 9); Westlake Audio (West Hollywood) (Note: Tracks 6, 12, 14 and 15); The Hit Factory Criteria (Miami) (Note: Tracks 7 and 8); Right Track (New York City) (Note: Track 11); Bangladesh (Atlanta) (Note: Tracks 12 and 15); Doppler (Atlanta) (Note: Track 13); Ocean Way (Hollywood) (Note: Track 14); Chalice (Hollywood, California) (Note: Tracks 16 and 17); Larrabee (North Hollywood) (Note: Track 16)
- Genre: R&B
- Length: 72:42
- Label: Jive
- Producers: Bangladesh; Bloodshy & Avant; Jason "Poo Bear" Boyd; Cool & Dre; Dr. Luke; Damon Elliott; Sean Garrett; Cee-Lo Green; Jake and the Phatman; Knobody; Max Martin; Polow da Don; Raphael Saadiq; Scott Storch; Teddy "Bear"; will.i.am

Kelis chronology
Tasty (2003)	Kelis Was Here (2006)	The Hits (2008)

Singles from Kelis Was Here
- 1. "Bossy" Released: April 3, 2006; 2. "Blindfold Me" Released: October 3, 2006; 3. "Lil Star" Released: February 19, 2007

Kelis Was Here is the fourth studio album by American singer Kelis, released on August 22, 2006, by Jive Records. Originally titled The Puppeteer, the album features production by Bangladesh, Raphael Saadiq, Max Martin, Sean Garrett, and Scott Storch, among others, and also features collaborations with will.i.am, Nas, Cee-Lo, Too Short, and Spragga Benz. It is Kelis's first album not to feature longtime collaborators the Neptunes. Kelis Was Here received a nomination for Best Contemporary R&B Album at the 2007 Grammy Awards.

== Release and promotion ==
The album's lead single, "Bossy", features rapper Too Short. The song peaked at number 16 on the Billboard Hot 100 and was certified double platinum by the Recording Industry Association of America (RIAA) on December 11, 2006. The second single from the album, "Blindfold Me", featuring Nas, was released solely in the United States. It failed to enter the Billboard Hot 100, while peaking at number 91 on the Hot R&B/Hip-Hop Songs chart. "Lil Star", which features Cee-Lo of the duo Gnarls Barkley, was released internationally as the album's third and final single. The track reached number three on the UK Singles Chart, earning Kelis her fifth UK top-five single as a lead artist.

Due to the use of "I Don't Think So" in a promotional advertising for Big Brother Australia 2008, the song entered the Australian ARIA Singles Chart at number 49 on April 21, 2008. The following week it rose to number 29, ultimately peaking at number 27. It also reached number eight on the ARIA Urban Singles Chart.

== Critical reception ==
Professional ratings
Aggregate scores
Source	Rating
Metacritic	70/100
Review scores
Source	Rating
AllMusic	3.5/5 stars
Entertainment Weekly	B
The Guardian	2/5 stars
Los Angeles Times	3.5/4 stars
NME	7/10
Pitchfork	7.5/10
Q	4/5 stars
Slant Magazine	2.5/5 stars
Spin	3/5 stars
Uncut	4/5 stars

Kelis Was Here received generally positive reviews from music critics. At Metacritic, which assigns a normalized rating out of 100 to reviews from mainstream publications, the album received an average score of 70, based on 23 reviews. Ann Powers from the Los Angeles Times praised its eclectic music and said that it "mines a memory of R&B as the playground of category-dismantling individualists." NME magazine wrote that it feels like "a wildly ambitious Warhol-esque art project." Kelefa Sanneh from The New York Times described the album as "typically garish and glorious", with sounds that range from "space-age hip-hop ... to space-age guitar pop". Q magazine said that the album is "chock-full of surreal soul diamonds." Pitchfork's Tim Finney wrote that, like Wanderland, the album is "formally varied but feels consistent—even monochrome in parts." In a review for The Observer, Peter Robinson commented that the album "occasionally misfires ... but there's still sass and creativity here." MSN Music's Robert Christgau gave Kelis Was Here a one-star honorable mention, indicating "a worthy effort consumers attuned to its overriding aesthetic or individual vision may well like." He cited "Blindfold Me" and "What's That Right There" as highlights, and quipped, "Good for sex and not much else, which in a fantasy object is plenty."

In a mixed review, Slant Magazine critic Preston Jones said that, although it is "an intriguing mishmash of sounds, beats, and vocal affectations", the album is "far too long" and lacks a song on-par with "Milkshake". Chris Salmon of The Guardian wrote that without the Neptunes, "contributors such as Black Eyed Peas' Will.i.am and [...] Shondrae reject all subtlety for songs that caricature Kelis as sexy, bolshy and not much else. The results are shallow and unconvincing, driven by the kind of brash holler and breathy schmaltz you would expect from J-Lo or Pussycat Dolls (complete with the rubbish guest raps)." Mikael Wood of Spin said that Kelis "consolidates" her previous "allure" and "turns up sex, turns down sass". Andy Kellman of AllMusic felt that it lacks first-rate material and "the range of emotions to match the varied backdrops." Quentin B. Huff of PopMatters argued that "[t]he songs are individually good, but don't really sound like they should have been grouped together on an album."

The album was nominated for Best Contemporary R&B Album at the 2007 Grammy Awards, but lost out to Beyoncé's B'Day.

== Commercial performance ==
Kelis Was Here debuted at number 10 on the Billboard 200 with 58,000 copies sold in its first week, becoming Kelis's highest-peaking album on the chart to date. According to Nielsen SoundScan, the album had sold 160,000 copies in the United States as of May 2010.

The album debuted at number 41 on the UK Albums Chart, selling 6,709 copies in its first week. It was certified silver by the British Phonographic Industry (BPI) on September 29, 2006, and by May 2010, it had sold 32,083 copies in the United Kingdom.

== Track listing ==
No.	Title	Writer(s)	Producer(s)	Length
1.	"Intro"			1:27
2.	"Bossy" (featuring Too Short)	Kelis Rogers-Jones; Shondrae Crawford; Todd Shaw; Sean Garrett	Shondrae "Bangladesh" Crawford; Garrett^{[a]}	4:34
3.	"What's That Right There"	Rogers-Jones; William Adams, Jr.; Keith Harris; George Clinton III; Philippé Wynne	will.i.am	4:17
4.	"Till the Wheels Fall Off"	Rogers-Jones; Adams; George Pajon, Jr.; Harris; Printz Board	will.i.am	4:13
5.	"Living Proof"	Raphael Saadiq; Robert Ozuna	Saadiq; Jake and the Phatman^{[a]}	3:41
6.	"Blindfold Me"	Garrett; Jamal Jones	Polow da Don; Garrett	3:48
7.	"Goodbyes"	Rogers-Jones; Andre Lyon; Marcello Valenzano	Cool & Dre	4:42
8.	"Trilogy"	Rogers-Jones; Scott Storch; Jason Boyd	Storch; Jason "Poo Bear" Boyd^{[a]}	3:56
9.	"Circus"	Rogers-Jones; Saadiq; Ozuna	Saadiq; Jake and the Phatman^{[a]}	4:40
10.	"Weekend" (featuring will.i.am)	Rogers-Jones; Adams; Harris	will.i.am	4:42
11.	"Like You"	Rogers-Jones; Jerome Foster	Knobody	3:00
12.	"Aww Shit!" (featuring Smoke)	Crawford; Shanell Woodgett; Tamika Means	Crawford	4:09
13.	"Lil Star" (featuring Cee-Lo)	Rogers-Jones; Thomas Callaway	Cee-Lo Green	4:55
14.	"I Don't Think So"	Rogers-Jones; Max Martin; Lukasz Gottwald	Martin; Dr. Luke	3:02
15.	"Handful"	Rogers-Jones; Garrett; Crawford; Boyd	Crawford	2:59
16.	"Appreciate Me"	Rogers-Jones; Damon Elliott	Elliott; Teddy "Bear"^{[a]}	4:02
17.	"Have a Nice Day"	Elliott; Grecco Buratto	Elliott	6:33
18.	"Fuck Them Bitches" (hidden track)	Adams; Pajon	will.i.am	3:49
Total length:				72:42

International edition
No.	Title	Writer(s)	Producer(s)	Length
1.	"Intro"			1:27
2.	"Blindfold Me" (featuring Nas)	Garrett; Jones; Nasir Jones	Polow da Don; Garrett	4:19
3.	"Bossy" (featuring Too Short)	Rogers-Jones; Crawford; Shaw; Garrett	Crawford; Garrett^{[a]}	4:33
4.	"Fire" (featuring Spragga Benz)	Rogers-Jones; Christian Karlsson; Pontus Winnberg; Henrik Jonback; Michelle Bell; Carlton Grant	Bloodshy & Avant	3:31
5.	"I Don't Think So"	Rogers-Jones; Martin; Gottwald	Martin; Dr. Luke	3:02
6.	"Weekend" (featuring will.i.am)	Rogers-Jones; Adams; Harris	will.i.am	4:42
7.	"Trilogy"	Rogers-Jones; Storch; Boyd	Storch; Boyd^{[a]}	3:56
8.	"Appreciate Me"	Rogers-Jones; Elliott	Elliott; Teddy "Bear"^{[a]}	4:02
9.	"Till the Wheels Fall Off"	Rogers-Jones; Adams; Pajon; Harris; Board	will.i.am	4:13
10.	"Handful"	Rogers-Jones; Garrett; Crawford; Boyd	Crawford	2:59
11.	"Aww Shit!" (featuring Smoke)	Crawford; Woodgett; Means	Crawford	4:09
12.	"What's That Right There"	Rogers-Jones; Adams; Harris; Clinton; Wynne	will.i.am	4:18
13.	"Circus"	Rogers-Jones; Saadiq; Ozuna	Saadiq; Jake and the Phatman^{[a]}	4:40
14.	"Lil Star" (featuring Cee-Lo)	Rogers-Jones; Callaway	Green	4:52
15.	"Like You"	Rogers-Jones; Foster	Knobody	3:01
16.	"Living Proof"	Saadiq; Ozuna	Saadiq; Jake and the Phatman^{[a]}	3:41
17.	"Goodbyes"	Rogers-Jones; Lyon; Valenzano	Cool & Dre	4:42
18.	"Have a Nice Day"	Elliott; Buratto	Elliott	6:33
19.	"Fuck Them Bitches" (hidden track)	Adams; Pajon	will.i.am	3:49
Total length:				76:29

=== Notes ===
- ^{^[a]} signifies a co-producer

=== Sample credits ===
- "What's That Right There" contains a sample from "(Not Just) Knee Deep", as performed by Funkadelic.

== Personnel ==
Credits adapted from the liner notes of Kelis Was Here.

=== Musicians ===
- Kelis – vocals
- Too Short – vocals (track 2)
- will.i.am – drum programming (tracks 3, 10); clavinet, Moog bass (track 3); synth, drums (track 4); vocals, keyboards (track 10)
- Keith Harris – keyboards (track 3); Rhodes guitar (tracks 4, 10); additional keyboards, Moog bass (track 10)
- Printz Board – trumpet (track 4)
- George Pajon Jr. – guitar (track 4)
- Chuck Prada – percussion (track 4)
- Raphael Saadiq – bass, guitar (tracks 5, 9)
- Bobby Ozuna – drums, turntables (tracks 5, 9); percussion (track 9)
- Charles Jones – piano, keyboards (tracks 5, 9)
- Meneradini "Bridge" Timothee – piano, keyboards (track 5)
- Cheryl Evans – background vocals (track 11)
- Smoke – vocals (track 12)
- Cee-Lo Green – vocals (track 13)
- Lukasz Gottwald – all instruments (track 14)
- Max Martin – all instruments (track 14)
- Teddy "Bear" – programming, keyboards (track 16)
- Joseph Edwards – choir (track 16)
- Sandra Riley – choir (track 16)
- Erika Schimdt – choir (track 16)
- Julio Hanson – choir (track 16)
- Jim Gilstrap – choir (track 16)
- Kerry Paxton – choir (track 16)
- Dawn Beckman – choir (track 16)
- John Patrick – choir (track 16)
- Jason Brown – choir (track 16)
- Renee Bowers – choir (track 16)
- Damon Elliott – arrangement (track 17)
- Grecco Burratto – co-arrangement (track 17)
- Renato Brasa – percussion (track 17)

=== Technical ===
- Bangladesh – production (tracks 2, 12, 15); recording (tracks 12, 15)
- Sean Garrett – co-production (track 2); production (track 6)
- Doug Wilson – recording (tracks 2, 6, 11)
- Charles McCrorey – recording (track 2)
- Too Short – recording (track 2)
- John Frye – mixing (track 2)
- will.i.am – production (tracks 3, 4, 10)
- Padraic Kerin – recording (tracks 3, 4, 10)
- Joe Peluso – engineering assistance (tracks 3, 10); mix engineering assistance (tracks 3, 4, 10)
- Ethan Willoughby – mixing (tracks 3, 4, 10)
- Raphael Saadiq – production (tracks 5, 9)
- Jake and the Phatman – co-production (tracks 5, 9)
- Danny Romero – recording, mixing (tracks 5, 9)
- John Tanksley – Pro Tools engineering (tracks 5, 9)
- James Tanksley – Pro Tools engineering assistance (tracks 5, 9)
- Wesley Morrow – production coordination (tracks 5, 9)
- Polow da Don – production (track 6)
- Brian Sumner – recording (tracks 6, 12, 14, 15)
- Brian Stanley – mixing (track 6)
- Mike Makowski – mixing assistance (track 6)
- Cool & Dre – production (track 7)
- Robert "Brizz" Brisbane – recording (track 7)
- Phil Tan – mixing (track 7)
- Josh Houghkirk – mixing assistance (track 7)
- Scott Storch – production (track 8)
- Jason "Poo Bear" Boyd – co-production (track 8)
- Conrad Golding – recording (track 8)
- Marc Lee – recording (track 8)
- Wayne "The Brain" Allison – recording (track 8)
- Vadim Chislov – recording assistance (track 8)
- James Roach – recording assistance (track 8)
- Fabian Marasciullo – mixing (track 8)
- Chad Jolley – mixing assistance (track 8)
- Knobody – production (track 11)
- Tatsuya Sato – recording (track 11)
- Kevin Crouse – recording (track 11)
- Neal Pogue – mixing (track 11)
- Jean-Marie Horvat – mixing (track 12)
- Colin Miller – mixing assistance (track 12)
- Cee-Lo Green – production (track 13)
- Ben H. Allen – recording (track 13)
- Serban Ghenea – mixing (tracks 13, 14)
- John Hanes – Pro Tools engineering (track 13); additional Pro Tools engineering (track 14)
- Tim Roberts – Pro Tools engineering assistance (tracks 13, 14)
- Max Martin – production (track 14)
- Dr. Luke – production (track 14)
- Darien Gap – mixing (track 15)
- Damon Elliott – production (tracks 16, 17)
- Teddy "Bear" – co-production (track 16)
- Renson Mateo – recording (tracks 16, 17)
- Nathan Connelly – recording assistance (tracks 16, 17)
- Dave "Hard Drive" Pensado – mixing (tracks 16, 17)
- The Blitzburg Group – mixing assistance (tracks 16, 17)
- Dave Mattix – recording assistance (track 17)
- Chris Athens – mastering
- Kelis – executive production
- Mark Pitts – executive production
- J. Erving – executive production

=== Artwork ===
- Denise Trotman – art direction, design
- Markus Klinko – photography
- Indrani – photography

== Charts ==
Chart performance for Kelis Was Here
Chart (2006)	Peak position
Australian Albums (ARIA)	96
Australian Urban Albums (ARIA)	8
Austrian Albums (Ö3 Austria)	69
Belgian Albums (Ultratop Flanders)	45
Belgian Albums (Ultratop Wallonia)	88
Canadian Albums (Nielsen SoundScan)	60
Dutch Albums (Album Top 100)	82
French Albums (SNEP)	104
German Albums (Offizielle Top 100)	77
Italian Albums (FIMI)	90
Japanese Albums (Oricon)	109
Norwegian Albums (VG-lista)	35
Scottish Albums (Official Charts)	72
Swedish Albums (Sverigetopplistan)	51
Swiss Albums (Schweizer Hitparade)	22
UK Albums (Official Charts)	41
UK R&B Albums (Official Charts)	5
US Billboard 200	10
US Top R&B/Hip-Hop Albums (Billboard)	6

== Certifications ==
Certifications for Kelis Was Here
Region	Certification	Certified units/sales
United Kingdom (BPI)	Silver	60,000^{^}
^{^} Shipments figures based on certification alone.

== Release history ==
Release history for Kelis Was Here
Region	Date	Label	Ref.
Canada	August 22, 2006	Sony BMG	
United States	August 22, 2006	Jive	
Germany	September 8, 2006	EMI	
Netherlands	September 8, 2006	EMI	
United Kingdom	September 11, 2006	Virgin	
Sweden	September 13, 2006	EMI	
Italy	September 15, 2006	EMI	
Australia	September 16, 2006	EMI	
Japan	September 29, 2006	EMI	
