= Modern Love (Kids of 88 album) =

Studio album by Kids of 88
- Released: 5 October 2012
- Recorded: 2011/2012
- Genres: Pop, synth-pop, electropop, alternative pop
- Length: 38:22
- Labels: Dryden Street, Sony Music

Kids of 88 chronology
Sugarpills EP (2011)	Modern Love (2012)

Singles from Modern Love
- 1. "Tucan" Released: 11 May 2012; 2. "LaLa" Released: 24 August 2012; 3. "The Drug" Released: 16 November 2012; 4. "Bad Talk" Released: 24 July 2013

Professional ratings
Review scores
Source	Rating
The New Zealand Herald	4/5 stars
New Zealand Woman's Weekly	favorable

Modern Love is the second and final album by the New Zealand electropop band Kids of 88, released worldwide on 5 October 2012.

== Reception ==
Scott Kara of The New Zealand Herald wrote, "Kids of 88 return with a more mature new album" and "they are no less ambitious this time round with the release of [a] second album".

== Singles ==
- "Tucan", the first single, was released digitally on 11 May 2012.
- "LaLa", the second single, was released 24 August 2012. "LaLa" was commissioned onto radio on 17 August 2012, one week before the official release. The song peaked at number 30 on the RIANZ New Zealand Singles Chart. The second single was originally meant to be "Bad Talk" after receiving funding for the music video by NZ On Air.
- "The Drug" first received music video funding from NZ On Air for a music video, suggesting that it would be the third single from the album. On 16 November 2012, the song was available from the iTunes Store as a single.
- "Bad Talk" received music video funding from NZ On Air shortly after "Tucan" was released, suggesting that it would be the second single from the album. However, "LaLa" became the second and "The Drug" the third. On 6 April 2013, the band announced a music video was to be released for "Bad Talk" and it was released on 24 July 2013.

== Track listing ==
All tracks are written by Sam McCarthy, Jaden Parkes and Jordan Arts except "Komodo", "Tucan" and "Zion" written by Sam McCarthy, Jaden Parkes, Jordan Arts and Joel Little; "Raza" written by Sam McCarthy and Jaden Parkes; "India" written by Sam McCarthy and Jordan Arts.

Modern Love
No.	Title	Length
1.	"Komodo"	3:45
2.	"Euphoria"	3:37
3.	"LaLa"	2:38
4.	"Tucan" (featuring Alisa Xayalith)	3:57
5.	"Feel The Love"	3:46
6.	"Raza"	3:28
7.	"Zion"	3:49
8.	"The Drug"	3:00
9.	"Hypno"	3:13
10.	"India"	3:57
11.	"Bad Talk"	3:12
Total length:		38:22

iTunes Store digital bonus
No.	Title	Length
12.	"Tucan (Pikachunes Remix)"	3:47

JB Hi-Fi pre-order exclusive tracks
No.	Title	Length
12.	"Mercury"	3:38
13.	"Bones"	3:51
14.	"LoveFlow"	3:36
15.	"French Green"	4:00
