= The Night (Goodnight Nurse song) =

Single by Goodnight Nurse

from the album Keep Me On Your Side
- Released: (Australia) (New Zealand) 4 February 2008
- Recorded: August 2007, Melbourne
- Genre: Pop punk Alternative rock
- Length: 3:06
- Label: Warner Music Australia & NZ
- Songwriter(s): Joel Little; Jaden Parkes; S McCarthy

Goodnight Nurse singles chronology
"All for You" (2007)	"The Night" (2008)	"I Need This" (2008)

"The Night" is a song from Goodnight Nurse's second studio album, Keep Me On Your Side. It was released as the first single from the album on 4 February 2008 in Australia and New Zealand.

The song has been credited as a "danceable stomp reminiscent of Bloc Party's Flux" after being released on their "second album that surprises with its new-found maturity."

Despite only being a digital release it is the biggest selling single Goodnight Nurse have had, and has been their highest performing song on the New Zealand radio charts.

== Track listing ==
1. The Night - 3:06

=== Charts ===
Chart	Peak position
RIANZ Singles Chart	24
