= Keep Me on Your Side =

Studio album by Goodnight Nurse
- Released: 7 April 2008
- Recorded: August 2007; Melbourne, Australia
- Genre: Pop punk Alternative rock
- Label: Warner (Aus & NZ)
- Producer: Lindsay Gravina

Goodnight Nurse chronology
Always and Never (2006)	Keep Me on Your Side (2008)

Singles from Keep Me on Your Side
- 1. "The Night" Released: 4 February 2008; 2. "I Need This" Released: 5 May 2008; 3. "This Is It" Released: 29 November 2008; 4. "Lay With Me" Released: 27 April 2009

Professional ratings
Review scores
Source	Rating
Stuff.co.nz	3/5 stars

Keep Me on Your Side is the second studio album by New Zealand pop punk band Goodnight Nurse, released on 7 April 2008. The album was the follow-up to their successful debut album, Always and Never. It peaked at number five on New Zealand's RIANZ chart.

The album has produced three singles to date. "The Night" was released in Australia and New Zealand on 4 February 2008, with a music video for the song released on 24 February 2008. The second single from the album was "I Need This", it released on 5 May 2008. The third single "Serpent Queen Pt. 2" was released on 'free-to-download' on New Zealand's iTunes, which accelerated the album's success.

== Production ==
The album was recorded in Melbourne, Australia around August 2007. It was produced by Lindsay Gravina, well known for his work with bands such as The Living End, Shihad and Thirsty Merc. A total of 40 songs were originally demoed by the group, with only 12 making it into the final cut to be recorded for the album. Keep Me on Your Side was mastered in New York by respected recording engineer Ted Jensen, who is best known for his work with Norah Jones' 2003 Grammy Award winning album Come Away with Me, Simple Plan and is also signed up to do Metallica's upcoming 9th studio album.

== Reception ==
Keep Me on Your Side gained fairly positive reviews, though did not achieve the critical acclaim of its predecessor Always and Never. Reviewer Chris Schulz gave the album a 3 out of 5 star rating for national news website Stuff.co.nz. Complimenting a variety of aspects of the album, including lead single "The Night" - stating it "has a danceable stomp reminiscent of Bloc Party's Flux". He also went on to give mention to the "hard-hitting anthem" "Drift Away", saying it is sure to become a "live favourite". Compliments were also cited for the "serious" side of the album, as "Hard to Watch You Go" gained praise with its "real conviction" as "they come across like latter-day Blink 182". Schulz goes on to say the album is "let down by a couple of tracks that sound like Goodnight Nurse are fighting for inclusion on the next soundtrack for Grey's Anatomy - "Lay With Me" and "I Need This" especially." Overall they were seen as "aiming admirably high on an impressive second effort".

Music News website The Edge FM rated the new album as the "best work from Goodnight Nurse so far", saying it was "so different... from their previous album" and how it is "amazing and exciting". Also they went on to say it was full of "pretty much mind-blowing songs", with "other fantastic singles to come" after "The Night". A review also posted on the site labelled the second album from GNN as "catchy" and of a "high standard". Stating "the album opens with dark but catchy "Serpent Queen Part 2"" and that it doesn't slow down from there as "it's an album that starts awesome and finishes just as strong".

The album's cover, illustrated by Barny Bewick, won the 2008 Vodafone New Zealand Music Award for Best Album Cover.

== Track listing ==
1. "Serpent Queen Pt. 2" - 2:53
2. "The Night" - 3:06
3. "Details" - 2:59
4. "Hard to Watch You Go" - 3:40
5. "Lay With Me" - 3:03
6. "I Need This" - 3:33
7. "Jesse" - 3:23
8. "Drift Away" - 2:59
9. "This is it" - 3:13
10. "Drown" - 3:06
11. "Say Your Goodbyes" - 2:56
12. "Take it All" - 2:53
13. "Take Me Away" - 3:26 (iTunes bonus track)

== Charts ==
=== Album ===
Chart	Chart position
New Zealand RIANZ albums chart	5

=== Singles ===
Year	Song	Peak chart position
Year	Song	NZ
2008	"The Night"	24
2008	"I Need This"	—
2008	"This Is It"	—
