= My Only =

Single by Goodnight Nurse

from the album Always and Never
- Released: 2006
- Recorded: 2005
- Genre: Rock
- Length: 2:29

Goodnight Nurse singles chronology
"Our Song" (2005)	"My Only" (2006)	"Death Goes to Disco" (2006)

"My Only" is a song from Goodnight Nurse's debut studio album, Always and Never. It was released as the fifth single from the album in 2006. It peaked at number 21 on the RIANZ charts in New Zealand.

"My Only" was featured on Electronic Arts's NHL 07 video game.

== Track listings ==
1. "My Only" - 2:29
2. "I Would"
3. "My Only" (Video)

== Chart positions ==
Chart (2006)	Peak position
RIANZ Singles Chart	21
