= Always and Never =

Studio album by Goodnight Nurse
- Released: 23 January 2006
- Genre: Pop punk, punk rock, rock
- Label: Festival
- Producer: CaptainHook

Goodnight Nurse chronology
Always and Never (2006)	Keep Me On Your Side (2008)

Professional ratings
Review scores
Source	Rating
Amplifier Magazine	4/5 stars

Always and Never is the debut album by New Zealand pop punk band, Goodnight Nurse, released in January 2006.

== Album information ==
The album spawned many singles and radio hits, including, "My Only", "Death Goes To Disco", "Loner", "Our Song", "Going Away", "Taking Over", and "All For You" (most songs from the album were released as singles).

Always and Never went Gold after only a week of release and debuted to place number 5 on the RIANZ New Zealand Top 40 Albums Chart. From then on, the album stayed in the Top 40 for 5 weeks (from 30 January until 27 February).

New Zealand critics took notice of the tight riffs and hooks, wide range of subject matter, and musical diversity (the album included fast, punk songs, as well as more mature-sounding songs that deal with themes such as death).

Joel Little, the lead singer, said, when asked about the subject matter of the album:

I don’t know, it’s not always about what’s pissing us off, just what we’re feeling at the time. Our earlier singles were more about things you care about when you’re 18, like not being able to get a girlfriend or whatever, going to parties and stuff. As you get a bit older you explore different themes. The new album is a bit of a wide range, there’s some happier party kinda tunes, then there’s some serious ones about like people who have died and that kind of thing. I think that if you just write about what’s going on in your life, there’s always gonna be someone out there that can relate, because we all go through some of the same things.

== Track listing ==
1. "Welcome To Hell" featuring Ben's Choir – 0:48
2. "My Only" – 2:29
3. "Death Goes to Disco" – 3:34
4. "All Hail The Serpent Queen Part 1; Trilogy" – 2:48
5. "Take My Hand" – 3:38
6. "Loner" – 2:18
7. "No Way To Escape" – 3:13
8. "Our Song" – 3:51
9. "A Shadow And A Prayer" – 3:48
10. "Suffocating Slow" – 3:08
11. "Suffer" – 3:10
12. "Massacre Begins Tonight" – 3:30
13. "All For You" featuring Kimbra Johnson – 4:56
14. "Milkshake" (Bonus) – 2:28

=== Alternate track listing ===
1. "Welcome To Hell" featuring Ben's Choir – 0:48
2. "My Only" – 2:29
3. "Death Goes to Disco" – 3:34
4. "All Hail The Serpent Queen Part 1; Trilogy" – 2:48
5. "Take My Hand" – 3:38
6. "Loner" – 2:18
7. "No Way To Escape" – 3:13
8. "Our Song" – 3:51
9. "A Shadow And A Prayer" – 3:48
10. "Going Away" – 3:17
11. "Suffer" – 3:10
12. "Taking Over" – 3:03
13. "All For You" (Bonus) – 15:10

== Charts ==
Date of Release	Title	Label	Charted	Certification	Copies Sold	Catalog Number
January 2006	Always and Never	Festival Records	5	Gold	7500+	339092

=== Singles ===
Year	Single	Album	RIANZ Chart	Certification
2003	"Loner"	Always & Never	19	–
2004	"Taking Over"	Always & Never	19	–
2004	"Going Away"	Always & Never	–	–
2005	"Our Song"	Always & Never	15	–
2006	"My Only"	Always & Never	21	–
2006	"Death Goes to Disco"	Always & Never	–	–
2007	"All For You"	Always & Never	29	–

== Music videos ==
Every song from Always and Never which was released as a single has an accompanying video, all of which are available on YouTube.

- 'Death Goes To Disco' Music Video
- 'Taking Over' Music Video
- 'Going Away' Music Video
- 'Our Song' Music Video
- 'My Only' Music Video
- 'Loner' Music Video
- 'All For You' Music Video
