= Sugarpills =

Studio album by Kids of 88
- Released: 16 August 2010
- Genre: Indie pop, electropop
- Label: Dryden Street / Sony Music Australia

Kids of 88 chronology
Sugarpills (2010)	Sugarpills EP (2011)

Singles from Sugarpills
- 1. "My House" Released: 20 April 2009; 2. "Just a Little Bit" Released: 15 February 2010; 3. "Downtown" Released: 19 July 2010

Sugarpills is the debut album from New Zealand electropop band Kids of 88 released 16 August 2010. Singles released off the album include "My House", "Just a Little Bit" and most recently "Downtown". It was nominated for Best Pop Album at the 2011 New Zealand Music Awards.

== Reception ==
Professional ratings
Review scores
Source	Rating
The New Zealand Herald	4/5 stars
Stuff.co.nz	mixed

Scott Kara of The New Zealand Herald gave Sugarpills 4 out of 5 stars, calling it "good-time party music" and saying that "You'd have to be a prude, or a killjoy not to want Sugarpills banging away at your house."

== Singles ==
- "My House", the first single from Kids of 88 was first heard on a C4 television advertisement. The song peaked at number 3 on the RIANZ New Zealand Singles Chart and remained in the chart for 17 weeks.
- "Just a Little Bit", the second single from Kids of 88 was first heard on a Glassons NZ television advertisement. The song peaked at number 11 on the RIANZ New Zealand Singles Chart and remained in the chart for 19 weeks.
- "Downtown", the third single from Kids of 88 was first heard on radio station The Edge. The song has currently peaked at number 21 on the RIANZ New Zealand Singles Chart and is still currently in the chart.

== Track listing ==
All tracks are written by Sam McCarthy & Joel Little except "Cotton Mouth" written by Sam McCarthy & Jaden Parkes and "San Fran" written by Sam McCarthy, Joel Little & Jordan Arts.

Sugarpills
No.	Title	Writer(s)	Length
1.	"Ribbons of Light"		3:46
2.	"Just a Little Bit"		3:00
3.	"Cotton Mouth"	Sam McCarthy, Jaden Parkes	3:06
4.	"Everybody Knows"		4:13
5.	"My House"		3:59
6.	"Apart of You"		3:12
7.	"San Fran"	Sam McCarthy, Joel Little, Jordan Arts	3:13
8.	"Downtown"		3:05
9.	"Feed the Birds"		4:57
10.	"SQRL"		4:44
Total length:			40:24

iTunes Store digital bonus
No.	Title	Length
11.	"Mr Doorman"	2:46

Australia Edition
No.	Title	Writer(s)	Length
1.	"Ribbons of Light"		3:46
2.	"Just a Little Bit"		3:00
3.	"Cotton Mouth"	Sam McCarthy, Jaden Parkes	3:06
4.	"Everybody Knows"		4:13
5.	"My House"		3:59
6.	"Sugarpills" (Australian Album Edition)		3:25
7.	"Apart of You"		3:12
8.	"San Fran"	Sam McCarthy, Joel Little, Jordan Arts	3:13
9.	"Downtown"		3:05
10.	"Feed the Birds"		4:57
11.	"SQRL"		4:44
12.	"Nerves"		3:20
13.	"Home"		4:36

== Release history ==
Country	Release date
New Zealand	16 August 2010
Australia	11 July 2011
