= Goodnight Nurse =

New Zealand pop punk band

- Origin: Auckland, New Zealand
- Genres: Pop punk Alternative rock Punk rock Melodic hardcore
- Years active: 2001–2010; 2023–present
- Labels: Warner Music (2007–present); Festival Records (2005–2007)
- Members: Joel Little; Jaden Parkes; Sam McCarthy; Rowan Crowe
- Past members: Paul Taite
- Website: www.goodnightnurse.com

Goodnight Nurse was a New Zealand pop punk band formed in Auckland in 2001. The group began as a trio, then changed to a four-piece prior to the release of their second album. It consisted of lead vocalist Joel Little, guitarist and back up vocalist Sam McCarthy, bassist Rowan Crowe, with drummer and back up vocalist Jaden Parkes.

The band has released two studio albums, Always and Never (2006) and Keep Me On Your Side (2008). Both peaked at number five on the New Zealand Top 40 Album chart. The albums combined have spawned nine singles to date, with Goodnight Nurse having a top 40 single in New Zealand every year from 2004 to 2009's "Lay With Me".

== History ==
=== Formation and early activity ===
Goodnight Nurse formed in 2001 after bass player Paul Taite responded to a flyer Joel Little and Jaden Parkes put on the stairs at Shadows, the Auckland University bar. Goodnight Nurse met and practiced for the first time on 25 June 2001 in Parkes' garage. At the time of their formation, Taite had only been playing bass for 3 months.

Paul Taite left the band in 2007. Goodnight Nurse later became a four-piece, with the additions of Rowan Crowe and Sam McCarthy.

They played their first concert at Papa Jacks / Voodoo Lounge in Auckland in early 2002. They were chosen for the Boost Mobile NZ Schools Tour in 2004, during which they played at 120 venues nationwide over a period of five months, the single largest tour done by one band in New Zealand history. Other bands that have participated in the Boost Mobile NZ Schools Tour include Steriogram (2002), Wash (2003), My Life Story (2005), Falter (2006) and Streetwise Scarlet (2007). Goodnight Nurse have since toured New Zealand many times with bands such as Steriogram, Elemeno P and 48May, and Australian act The Living End. In 2006 they toured the east coast of Australia for three months on the Rock the Schools tour, and have played several other shows there since. Goodnight Nurse also played main stage at the Big Day Out 07.

=== Always and Never (2006) ===
Goodnight Nurse's debut album, Always and Never was certified gold by RIANZ a single week after it was released. It debuted to place number five on the RIANZ New Zealand Album Charts. The album spent 6 weeks in the Top 40 (30 January - 27 February). Always and Never produced seven singles including: "Loner", "Going Away", "Taking Over", "Our Song", "Death Goes to Disco", "All for You", and "My Only".

Goodnight Nurse also recorded a rock cover of Kelis' hit song "Milkshake", which appeared on the CD single for "Our Song" and as a bonus track on the Australian release of Always and Never. Goodnight Nurse's song "My Only" was also used on the NHL 07 soundtrack.

Following the release of their debut album, Goodnight Nurse hit the road. On 5 March 2007 Goodnight Nurse opened for Fall Out Boy on their New Zealand show. They also supported Story of the Year and HIM. In April 2007 they were the headline act on the MTV Mile High Gig, playing on an airplane flying at 35,000 feet over the Tasman Sea.

=== Keep Me on Your Side (2008) ===
On 24 September 2007, vocalist Joel Little announced that "the album is all recorded". Goodnight Nurse departed for "Melbourne on Monday (13 August 2007)" to record the album. He also said that they are "busy finishing mixing and getting the artwork together". Keep Me on Your Side was released on 7 April 2008. The first single "The Night" was released on iTunes in Australia and New Zealand on 4 February 2008, with a music video for the song being posted up on YouTube on 26 February. The album debuted at number five on the RIANZ album charts. The track "This Is It" was used in 2008 in television adverts for the Push Play initiative.

In support of the album, Goodnight Nurse scored a support show with American band OneRepublic, following Maroon 5 cancelling the New Zealand leg of their tour. OneRepublic became the headlining act and needed a supporting band. Goodnight Nurse provided the support for the OneRepublic performance in Auckland. Goodnight Nurse completed their first headlining tour in New Zealand in June 2008, the "I Need This Tour". They then went to Australia and supported The Getaway Plan on their "Where the City Meets the Sea" Australian tour in July 2008. They will be supporting Anberlin in August 2009 for one show only.

Jaden has also started a side project called "Like You Crazy", and Sam fronts the band Kids of 88. They formed the two side projects because there were several songs that did not make it onto the Keep Me on Your Side album which they liked.

=== Reunion ===
The band reunited to open for the My Chemical Romance concert at Western Springs, Auckland, in March 2023.

== Genre ==
Lead singer Joel Little has described the band as "a pop rock band that's been influenced by punk." Goodnight Nurse is frequently called New Zealand's answer to American pop-punk bands such as Green Day and Blink-182.

== Band members ==
- Joel Little – lead vocals, guitar
- Jaden Parkes – drums, backing vocals
- Sam McCarthy – guitar, backing vocals
- Rowan Crowe – bass

=== Member changes and hiatus ===
Paul Taite left Goodnight Nurse in early 2007 to pursue a career in Europe. His last performance with the band was at the Auckland Big Day Out in January 2007 – saying farewell to the band he formed with Joel and Jaden and served for almost 6 years together. Following Taite's departure, the remaining two band members – needing a bass player – approached Sam McCarthy of CapGunHero to replace Taite. In August 2007, vocalist Joel Little announced on the band's website that "Goodnight Nurse is now a 4-piece!" and that they'd been "wanting to do it for ages". The new member was to be Rowan Crowe, who would take up bass as Sam McCarthy would be "moving over to guitar". Joel stated that new bass player Rowan Crowe "is epic and he likes to jump off high places and go dumpster diving" and also that he "is a legend".

In February 2010 the band went into an indefinite hiatus. A message was posted on the band's MySpace thanking the fans for all their love and support: Plaza "We don’t know if or when we’ll be back, and we’ll all keep making music till the day we die, but for now this is it for Goodnight Nurse. So one last time THANK YOU from the bottom of our hearts for everything you’ve given us, it’s been an amazing 9 years and we love you for it."

Following their indefinite hiatus, lead singer and guitarist Joel Little went on to become a Grammy award-winning songwriter and producer, known for his work with Lorde, Jarryd James and Broods.

Guitarist Sam McCarthy and 2004 Smokefreerockquest winning "Incursa" bandmate Jordan Arts formed the New Wave musical duo Kids of 88.

== Discography ==
Goodnight Nurse discography
- Studio albums: 2
- Singles: 11
- Music videos: 6

=== Albums ===
Year	Album details	Peak chart positions	Certification
Year	Album details	NZ	Certification
2006	Always and Never: Released on 23 January 2006; Label: Festival	5	Gold
2008	Keep Me on Your Side: Released on 7 April 2008; Label: Warner	5	—

=== Singles ===
Year	Title	Peak chart positions	Album
Year	Title	NZ	Album
2003	"Loner"	19	Always and Never
2004	"Taking Over"	19	Always and Never
2004	"Going Away"	—	Always and Never
2005	"Our Song"	15	Always and Never
2006	"My Only"	21	Always and Never
2006	"Death Goes to Disco"	—	Always and Never
2007	"All for You"	29	Always and Never
2008	"The Night"	24	Keep Me on Your Side
2008	"I Need This"	—	Keep Me on Your Side
2008	"This Is It"	—	Keep Me on Your Side
2009	"Lay With Me"	—	Keep Me on Your Side
