= Kids of 88 =

New Zealand new wave duo

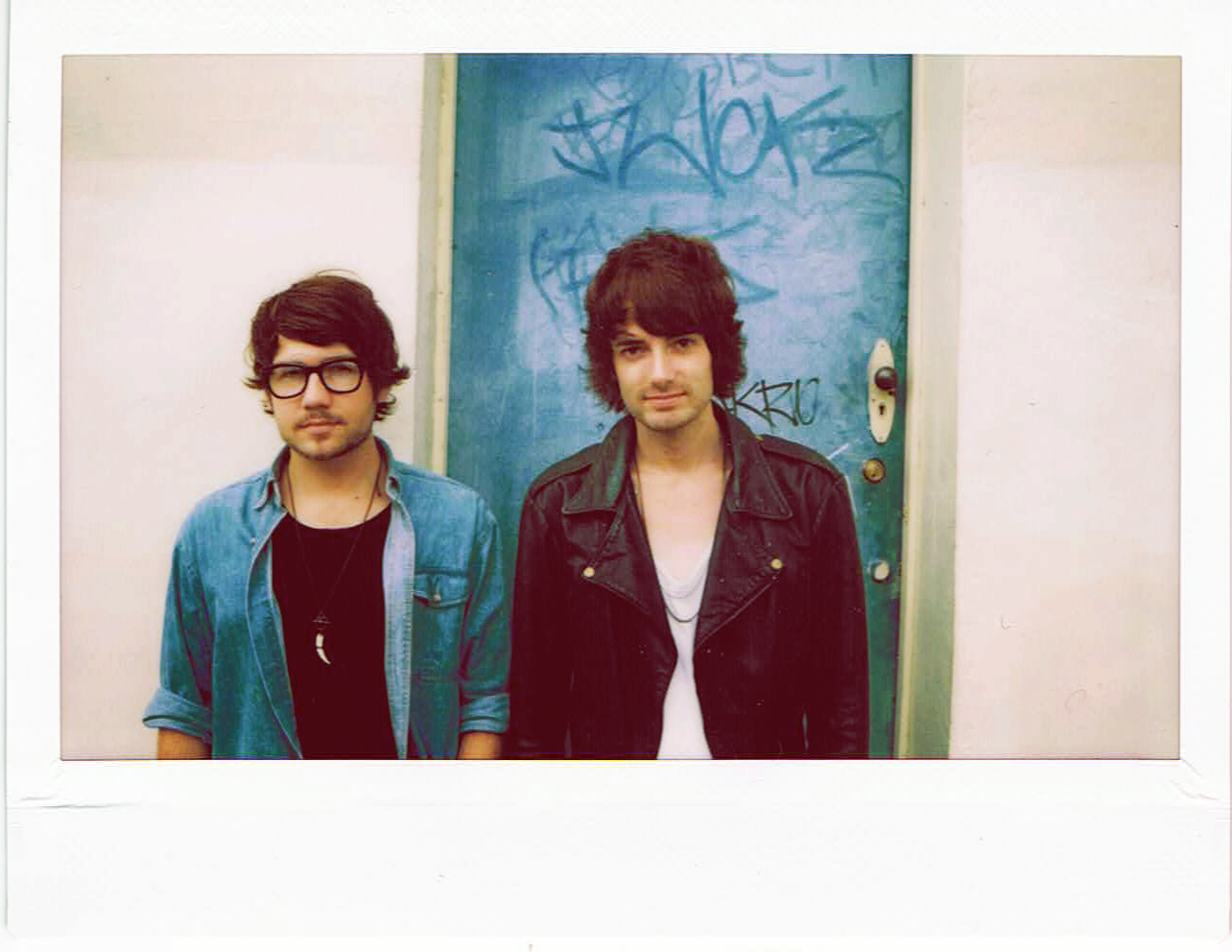
- Kids of 88: Jordan Arts and Sam McCarthy.

Background information
- Origin: Auckland, New Zealand
- Genres: Indie pop; synthpop; alternative dance; indietronica; electropop; new wave
- Years active: 2008–2014
- Labels: Dryden Street; Sony
- Members: Jordan Arts; Sam McCarthy

Kids of 88 were a New Zealand new wave duo based in Auckland, New Zealand, consisting of Jordan Arts and Sam McCarthy. They are best known for their 2009 single, "My House". They have since signed through Dryden Street to Sony Music and released the album Sugarpills in August 2010. In 2014, the duo stated that 'the [Kids of 88] project has concluded.'

== Members ==
- Jordan Arts – programming/keyboards
- Sam McCarthy – vocals

== History ==
=== 2000–2009: Career beginnings and style ===
It is known that the two have been best friends for ten years. They attended St Peter's College, Auckland, where they formed the band Incursa, winning the 2004 Smokefreerockquest. Sharing a passion for music, they decided to become musicians. The duo have described their music as "a cross between a late 80s police drama intro theme and a sophisticated super hussy. With sleazy basslines and mind-numbingly catchy hooks, Kids of 88 are all about poking tongues and making sweaty suggestive innuendos."

They cite their influences as "Groove, mood, and slutty arrangements. 16th hi hats and hand claps. Culture and couture, Gangster and glamour".

McCarthy is also a member of the band Goodnight Nurse.

=== 2010–2011: Sugarpills and extended play ===
In April 2010, Kids of 88 signed a worldwide record deal with Sony Music.

On the back of their debut album release, Kids of 88 are set to tour New Zealand with fellow kiwi indie band The Naked and Famous, the tour will hit the four main centres of Auckland, Wellington, Christchurch and Dunedin beginning 30 September.

At the 2010 New Zealand Music Awards, Kids of 88 won 'Single of the Year' and (with Tim Van Dammen) 'Music Video of the Year' for their single "Just a Little Bit".

In November 2010 they toured Australia and in December 2010 they headed to Europe to support Ke$ha on her tour.

In February 2011 they released an EP which included the track "Sugarpills" and 4 other new ones.

In July 2011 they released an extended Sugarpills version to Australia and the United States known as Sugarpills (Australian Edition) which includes the track Sugarpills and two new songs from the EP released into New Zealand in February.

On 8 August 2011 episode of MTV's Teen Wolf entitled "Formality", they were featured as the live band performing at the Beacon Hills formal. During their on screen set, they played "Just a Little Bit", "Ribbons of Light" and "Universe".

=== 2012: Modern Love ===
The second studio album, Modern Love was released worldwide on 5 October 2012. The first single "Tucan" was released on 11 May 2012. "Bad Talk" had been confirmed as the second single, with funding for its music video provided by NZ On Air, but has since been changed to "LaLa". Both tracks "Tucan" and "LaLa" had videos released well before the release of the full second album, which were both shot and directed by Levi Beamish. Tracks from the four-week JB Hi-Fi NZ Modern Love pre-order deal include "Bones", "Mercury", "LoveFlow" and "FrenchGreen", adopting the new no-space KidsOf88 look.

Since the release of the album, the duo went on to release a third single from Modern Love, "TheDrug", the music video to which was directed and shot by Sam Kristofski, starring several of the band's friends and neighbours.

On 23 July 2013, the band released a music video for their song "Bad Talk".

== Discography ==
Kids of 88 discography
- Studio albums: 2
- Extended plays: 1
- Singles: 7
- Music videos: 9

=== Albums ===
==== Studio albums ====
Year	Album details	Peak positions
Year	Album details	NZ
2010	Sugarpills: Released: 16 August 2010; Label: Dryden Street/Sony Music	2
2012	Modern Love: Released: 5 October 2012; Label: Dryden Street/Universal Music NZ	17

==== Extended plays ====
Year	Album details	Peak positions
Year	Album details	NZ
2011	Sugarpills EP: Released: 14 February 2011; Label: Dryden Street/Sony Music	—

=== Singles ===
==== As a main artist ====
Year	Single	Peak positions	Album
Year	Single	NZ	Album
2009	"My House"	3	Sugarpills
2010	"Just a Little Bit"	11	Sugarpills
2010	"Downtown"	21	Sugarpills
2010	"Sugarpills"		Sugarpills EP
2012	"Tucan"		Modern Love
2012	"LaLa"	30	Modern Love
2012	"The Drug"		Modern Love

==== As featured artist ====
Year	Single	Peak positions	Album
Year	Single	NZ	Album
2012	"Feel Inside (And Stuff Like That)"; Flight of the Conchords charity single	1	Non album song

==== Promotional Singles ====
Year	Single	Album
2010	"Everybody Knows"	Sugarpills
2011	"Nerves"	Sugarpills EP
2012	"Euphoria"	Modern Love
2012	"Komodo"	Modern Love

=== Music videos ===
Year	Title	Director	Official link
2009	"My House"	Jacob Thomas	Official Video
2010	"Just a Little Bit"	Tim van Dammen	Official Video
2010	"Ribbons of Light"	Toby Angwin	Official Video
2010	"Downtown"	Special Problems	Official Video
2011	"Sugarpills"	Jae Morrison	Official Video
2012	"Tucan"	Levi Beamish	Official Video
2012	"LaLa"	Levi Beamish	Official Video
2013	"The Drug"	Sam Kristofski	Official Video
2013	"Bad Talk"	Jordan Arts	Official Video

- "Special Problems" is the combined work of Campbell Hooper and Joel Kefali.

== Filmography ==
=== Television ===
Year	Title	Role	Notes
2011	MTV's Teen Wolf	Themselves	"Formality" (Season 1, episode 11)
2011	Channel 4's Fresh Meat	Soundtrack	"Just a Little Bit" (Season 1, episode 8)
2013	New Girl	Soundtrack	"LaLa" (Season 2, episode 22)

== Awards and nominations ==
Year	Type	Award	Result
2010	New Zealand Music Awards	Vodafone People's Choice Award	Nominated
2010	New Zealand Music Awards	Vodafone Single of The Year ("Just a Little Bit")	Won
2010	New Zealand Music Awards	C4 Best Music Video ("Just a Little Bit")	Won
2011	New Zealand Music Awards	FOUR Best Group	Nominated
2011	New Zealand Music Awards	The Edge Best Pop Album ("Sugarpills")	Nominated
2013	New Zealand Music Awards	Best Producer ("Modern Love")	Nominated
2013	New Zealand Music Awards	The Edge Best Pop Album ("Modern Love")	Nominated
