= Tasty (Kelis album) =

2003 studio album by Kelis

Studio album by Kelis
- Released: December 5, 2003
- Recorded: 2000–2003
- Studios: DARP (Atlanta) (Note: Tracks 2 and 8); O'Henry Sound (Burbank) (Note: Tracks 2 and 4); Chalice (Hollywood); Hovercraft (Virginia Beach) (Note: Tracks 3, 7, 10 and 12); Mirror Image (New York City) (Note: Track 5); Master Sound (Virginia Beach) (Note: Track 6); The Hit Factory Criteria (Miami) (Note: Track 7); Stankonia (Atlanta) (Note: Track 8); Blakeslee Recording Company (North Hollywood) (Note: Track 9, 11 and 14); Lot Musik (New York City) (Note: Track 13); Sony Music (New York City)
- Genre: R&B
- Length: 51:20
- Labels: Star Trak; Arista
- Producers: André 3000; Dallas Austin; Dame Blackmon "Grease"; Jake and the Phatman; the Neptunes; Rockwilder; Raphael Saadiq; Kelvin Wooten

Kelis chronology
Wanderland (2001)	Tasty (2003)	Kelis Was Here (2006)

Singles from Tasty
- 1. "Milkshake" Released: August 25, 2003; 2. "Trick Me" Released: February 17, 2004; 3. "Millionaire" Released: October 18, 2004; 4. "In Public" Released: April 4, 2005

Tasty is the third studio album by American singer Kelis, released on December 5, 2003, by Star Trak Entertainment and Arista Records. As executive producer, Kelis enlisted previous collaborators the Neptunes to produce the album, as well as new collaborators such as Raphael Saadiq, Dallas Austin, André 3000, Rockwilder, and Dame Blackmon "Grease". It also features guest vocals from Saadiq, André 3000, and then-boyfriend Nas.

The album was acclaimed by critics, who praised its originality and viewed it as an improvement on Kelis' previous albums, Kaleidoscope (1999) and Wanderland (2001). Tasty debuted at number 27 on the Billboard 200 with first-week sales of 93,600 copies, earning Kelis the best sales week of her career in the United States. The album also became her highest-peaking album in the United Kingdom, where it peaked at number 11 on the UK Albums Chart. It spawned four singles: "Milkshake", "Trick Me", "Millionaire", and "In Public".

One of the Neptunes-produced tracks on the album, "Flashback", was originally included on Wanderland, which was not initially released in North America.

== Singles ==
"Milkshake" was released on August 25, 2003, as the lead single from Tasty. It reached number three on the US Billboard Hot 100, becoming Kelis' highest-peaking single on the chart to date. The song was certified gold by the Recording Industry Association of America (RIAA) on October 25, 2004, and has sold 883,000 digital downloads in the United States. "Milkshake" also achieved commercial success internationally, reaching number one on the Irish Singles Chart and number two on the UK Singles Chart, as well as peaking inside the top five in Australia, Denmark, New Zealand, Norway, and Sweden. The song was nominated for a Grammy Award for Best Urban/Alternative Performance in 2004.

"Trick Me" was released on February 17, 2004, as the second single from the album. The track was successful in Europe and Oceania; it peaked at number two on the UK Singles Chart, while charting inside the top five in Australia, Ireland, New Zealand, and Norway, and the top 10 in Austria, Denmark, Germany, and Switzerland.

"Millionaire", which features André 3000, was released as the album's third single on October 18, 2004. The song peaked at number three on the UK Singles Chart, becoming the album's third consecutive top-three entry. "Millionaire" attained modest success elsewhere, reaching number 11 in Finland, number 23 in Australia, and number 27 in New Zealand.

The album's fourth and final single, "In Public", features Nas and was released on April 4, 2005. The song reached number 17 on the UK chart and number 22 on the Irish chart.

== Critical reception ==
Professional ratings
Aggregate scores
Source	Rating
Metacritic	80/100
Review scores
Source	Rating
AllMusic	4.5/5 stars
Blender	4/5 stars
Entertainment Weekly	A−
The Guardian	4/5 stars
The Independent	4/5 stars
NME	8/10
Pitchfork	6.5/10
Rolling Stone	3.5/5 stars
Slant Magazine	3/5 stars
Yahoo! Music	8/10 stars

Tasty received widespread acclaim from music critics. At Metacritic, which assigns a normalized rating out of 100 to reviews from mainstream publications, the album received an average score of 80, based on 18 reviews. Andy Kellman of AllMusic stated, "Despite all the new assistance, Tasty is formatted much like Kaleidoscope and Wanderland, constantly swinging back and forth between bouncy pop and laid-back (not throwback) soul." Ernest Hardy of Rolling Stone praised Tasty as Kelis' "best work" and wrote, "Take away the Dallas Austin-produced tracks [...], two Neptunes rock attempts and 'Milkshake', and you have a solid R&B album, one that's thickly speckled with hip-hop influences and nods to early Prince and Eighties Latin freestyle music." Entertainment Weekly's Neil Drumming described the album as "Kelis' past—big beats, out-there imagery, and sex appeal—refined" and commented that "much of the beauty of Tasty is in witnessing Kelis rise to the challenge of working with multiple imaginative maestros." In a review for NME, Tony Naylor found the album to be "[f]ar more complete than Wanderland or Kaleidoscope", adding that "such vacuum-packed musical freshness is maintained throughout."

Dorian Lynskey of The Guardian dubbed Kelis a "parallel universe Beyoncé" and wrote that she "exploits her husky croon like never before, pouring it over lascivious double entendre [...] and, well, lascivious single entrendre", concluding, "She may not be R&B's biggest star, but Kelis remains its most compelling character." The Independent noted that she "certainly takes the sexual initiative in several songs", but "[m]ostly, though, Kelis keeps a watchful eye on her affections in songs such as 'Protect My Heart' and 'Trick Me', and has developed a decidedly jaundiced view of hip hop's lop-sided sexual politics, judging by 'Keep It Down'." Joseph Patel of Blender commented that Kelis is "as good playing a hair-twisting, gum-popping tart on 'Sugar Honey Iced Tea' as an all-grown-up cock-blocker on the crackling funk ditty 'Trick Me'." Slant Magazine reviewer Sal Cinquemani felt that few of the tracks on the album are "as immediately thirst-quenching as the insta-classic lead single 'Milkshake'", and Pitchfork's Scott Plagenhoef opined that Tasty is "far from all doom-and-gloom". Adam Webb of Yahoo! Music expressed that the album is "not as far out wild as Kaleidoscope but it is a consistently inventive and brilliant record." Steve Jones of USA Today viewed that, "guests and idiosyncrasies aside, her honeyed voice is the most important ingredient. It's sweet enough to make you wonder, 'Did she just say that?' No one could ever accuse her of being bland."

== Commercial performance ==
Tasty debuted at number 27 on the Billboard 200 with 93,600 copies sold in its first week; it gave Kelis the best chart week of her career, and became her second highest-peaking album to date, after Kelis Was Here (2006). The album was certified gold by the RIAA on February 6, 2004, and had sold 535,000 copies in the United States as of December 2009.

The album debuted at number 53 on the UK Albums Chart, climbing to number 21 the following week. In its third week on the chart, the album rose to its peak position of number 11, becoming Kelis' highest-charting album in the UK to date. Tasty was certified platinum by the British Phonographic Industry (BPI) on October 22, 2004, and by April 2014, it had sold 476,034 copies in the United Kingdom.

== Track listing ==
Tasty track listing
No.	Title	Writer(s)	Producer(s)	Length
1.	"Intro"			1:30
2.	"Trick Me"	Dallas Austin	Austin	3:26
3.	"Milkshake"	Pharrell Williams; Chad Hugo	The Neptunes	3:02
4.	"Keep It Down"	Austin; Lonnie Lynn; Dion Wilson	Austin	3:26
5.	"In Public" (featuring Nas)	Dana Stinson; Kelis Rogers	Rockwilder	4:25
6.	"Flashback"	Williams; Hugo; Rogers	The Neptunes	3:25
7.	"Protect My Heart"	Williams; Hugo	The Neptunes	4:24
8.	"Millionaire" (featuring André 3000)	André Benjamin; Rogers; Douglas Davis; Ricky Walters	André 3000	3:44
9.	"Glow" (featuring Raphael Saadiq)	Saadiq; Glenn Standridge; Bobby Ozuna; Kelvin Wooten; Taura "Aura" Jackson	Saadiq; Jake and the Phatman^{[a]}; Wooten^{[a]}	4:00
10.	"Sugar Honey Iced Tea"	Williams; Hugo	The Neptunes	3:23
11.	"Attention" (featuring Raphael Saadiq)	Saadiq; Standridge; Ozuna; Wooten; Rogers	Saadiq; Jake and the Phatman^{[a]}; Wooten^{[a]}	3:24
12.	"Rolling Through the Hood"	Williams; Hugo	The Neptunes	4:45
13.	"Stick Up"	Damon Blackmon "Grease"; Rogers	Blackmon	3:51
14.	"Marathon"	Saadiq; Standridge; Ozuna; Wooten; Rogers	Saadiq; Jake and the Phatman^{[a]}; Wooten^{[a]}	4:35
Total length:				51:20

Japanese edition bonus tracks
No.	Title	Writer(s)	Producer(s)	Length
15.	"Milkshake" (X-Press 2 Triple Thick Vocal Mix)	Williams; Hugo	The Neptunes; X-Press 2^{[b]}	9:30
16.	"Milkshake" (DJ Zinc Remix)	Williams; Hugo	The Neptunes; DJ Zinc^{[b]}	5:59
Total length:				66:49

Notes

- ^{^a} signifies a co-producer
- ^{^b} signifies a remixer

Sample credits

- "Keep It Down" contains excerpts and samples from "I Used to Love H.E.R." by Common.
- "Millionaire" contains excerpts and samples from "La Di Da Di" by Doug E. Fresh and Slick Rick.

== Personnel ==
Credits adapted from the liner notes of Tasty.

=== Musicians ===
- Kelis – vocals
- Dallas Austin – arrangement (tracks 2, 4)
- Tony Reyes – guitar, background vocals (track 2)
- Greg "Ruckus" Andrews – DJ (tracks 2, 4)
- Nas – vocals (track 5)
- André 3000 – vocals, drums, music programming, keyboards (track 8)
- Kevin Kendricks – keyboards, piano (track 8)
- Raphael Saadiq – guitar (tracks 9, 11, 14); bass (tracks 9, 14); vocals (tracks 9, 11)
- Kelvin Wooten – keyboards (tracks 9, 11, 14); piano, sitar (track 9); bass, guitar (track 11)
- Jake and the Phatman – drums (tracks 9, 11); percussion, scratches (track 11); drum programming (track 14)

=== Technical ===
- Dallas Austin – production (tracks 2, 4)
- Rick Sheppard – recording (tracks 2, 4)
- Carlton Lynn – recording (tracks 2, 8)
- Doug Harms – recording assistance (tracks 2, 8)
- Cesar Guevara – recording assistance (tracks 2, 4)
- Kevin "KD" Davis – mixing (tracks 2, 4)
- The Neptunes – production (tracks 3, 6, 7, 10, 12)
- Andrew "Drew" Coleman – recording (tracks 3, 6, 7, 10, 12)
- Daniel Betancourt – recording assistance (tracks 3, 10)
- Phil Tan – mixing (tracks 3, 7, 10, 12)
- Tim Olmstead – mixing assistance (track 3)
- Rockwilder – production (track 5)
- Mike Koch – recording (track 5)
- Dave Pensado – mixing (track 5)
- Serban Ghenea – mixing (track 6)
- Pat "Pat 'Em Down" Viala – recording (track 7)
- André 3000 – production (track 8)
- Matthew Still – recording (track 8)
- Vincent Alexander – recording (track 8)
- James Majors – recording (track 8)
- Warren Bletcher – recording assistance (track 8)
- Dexter Simmons – mixing (track 8)
- Andrew Dawson – mixing assistance (track 8)
- Regina Davenport – production coordinator (track 8)
- Raphael Saadiq – production (tracks 9, 11, 14)
- Jake and the Phatman – co-production (tracks 9, 11, 14)
- Kelvin Wooten – co-production (tracks 9, 11, 14)
- Gerry Brown – recording (tracks 9, 11, 14)
- John Tanksley – recording, mixing assistance (tracks 9, 11, 14); recording assistance (track 14)
- Daniel Romero – mixing (tracks 9, 11, 14)
- Anette Sharvit – production coordinator (tracks 11, 14)
- Dame Blackmon "Grease" – production (track 13)
- Glen Marchese – recording, mixing (track 13)
- Geoffrey Rice – mixing assistance (track 13)
- Kelis – executive production
- Chris Athens – mastering

=== Artwork ===
- Joe Mama-Nitzberg – creative direction
- Jeffrey Schulz – art, layout
- Markus Klinko – photography
- Indrani – photography

== Charts ==
=== Weekly charts ===
Weekly chart performance for Tasty
Chart (2003–2004)	Peak position
Australian Albums (ARIA)	41
Australian Urban Albums (ARIA)	5
Austrian Albums (Ö3 Austria)	20
Belgian Albums (Ultratop Flanders)	35
Canadian Albums (Nielsen SoundScan)	63
Canadian R&B Albums (Nielsen SoundScan)	15
Danish Albums (Hitlisten)	15
Dutch Albums (Album Top 100)	16
French Albums (SNEP)	60
German Albums (Offizielle Top 100)	51
Irish Albums (IRMA)	15
Italian Albums (FIMI)	43
Japanese Albums (Oricon)	42
New Zealand Albums (RMNZ)	48
Norwegian Albums (VG-lista)	19
Scottish Albums (Official Charts)	16
Swedish Albums (Sverigetopplistan)	48
Swiss Albums (Schweizer Hitparade)	14
UK Albums (Official Charts)	11
UK R&B Albums (Official Charts)	2
US Billboard 200	27
US Top R&B/Hip-Hop Albums (Billboard)	7

=== Year-end charts ===
Year-end chart performance for Tasty
Chart (2004)	Position
Australian Urban Albums (ARIA)	18
Dutch Albums (Album Top 100)	55
UK Albums (OCC)	53
US Billboard 200	161
US Top R&B/Hip-Hop Albums (Billboard)	40

== Certifications ==
Certifications for Tasty
Region	Certification	Certified units/sales
Australia (ARIA)	Gold	35,000^{^}
United Kingdom (BPI)	Platinum	476,034
United States (RIAA)	Gold	535,000
^{^} Shipments figures based on certification alone.

== Release history ==
Release history for Tasty
Region	Date	Label	Ref.
Germany	December 5, 2003	EMI	
United Kingdom	December 8, 2003	Virgin	
United States	December 9, 2003	Star Trak; Arista	
Netherlands	December 9, 2003	EMI	
Italy	January 9, 2004	EMI	
Japan	January 16, 2004	EMI	
Australia	February 2, 2004	EMI	
Sweden	February 11, 2004	EMI	
Canada	February 17, 2004	EMI	
