= The Electric Confectionaires =

- Origin: New Zealand
- Genres: Pop, rock, jazz
- Years active: 2005-2010
- Label: SonyBMG
- Past members: Haddon Smith; Jaisi Sheehan; Rob Fenton; Jesse Sheehan; Toby McLennan; Calum Gunn; Hamish Bode
- Website: Myspace Page

The Electric Confectionaires were a four-piece musical group from Auckland, New Zealand. Their music is a diverse fusion of styles ranging from rock to garage, blues, surf and jazz. The band formed in 2005 at Takapuna Grammar School where original members Jaisi Sheehan, Haddon Smith, Rob Fenton, Calum Gunn and Toby McLeanan shared a music class. The group gained nationwide recognition when they won the 2005 Smokefree Rockquest.

== Formation and signing ==
Sheehan, Smith and Gunn hail from Devonport and first met in primary school after Gunn emigrated from the United Kingdom. Fenton (originally from Wellington) and Smith, bonded at school over a mutual love of jazz. In their music class at Takapuna Grammar School they formed the Electric Confectionaires with McLeanan. Later that year the group entered and won the Smokefree Rockquest, an annual high school music competition. Similar to other Rockquest participants, such as Bic Runga, Evermore and Nesian Mystik, the band gained nationwide recognition from the win, which led to a record signing. In December 2006 they signed with Sony BMG, and in November 2007 their debut album Sweet Tooth was released, following the singles 'Late Night Shopping Spree' and 'Sweet Tooth'. The album was recorded at Montage Studios in Grey Lynn with Murray Grindley (ex member of The Underdogs) in charge of production and Nic Manders in charge of engineering.

In 2009 'Piece of My Heart' was used as the theme music for Go Girls, a prime-time Comedy-drama which currently aired across New Zealand and Australia for 5 seasons from 2009 to 2013.

== Influences ==
The musical style of the Electric Confectionaires is predominantly influenced by bands of the 1960s and 70's, such as The Beatles, the Doors, the Kinks and Funk Brothers. This is reflected by their use of vintage instruments, such as a '73 Ludwig drum kit, '80s synthesizers and Wurlitzer pianos. "The band also frequently uses distinctive and complex arrangements influenced by their backgrounds in jazz; and close-harmony vocals, honed by barbershop quartet and choral singing during their schooldays."

== Band members ==
- Jaisi Sheehan (guitar and vocals)
- Jesse Sheehan (guitar, lead vocals)
- Haddon Smith (keyboards, harmonica, trumpet, backing vocals and guitar)
- Rob Fenton (drums, backing vocals)

Former members include Toby McLennan, Hamish Bode and Calum Gunn.

== Discography ==
=== Studio albums ===
- Sweet Tooth (2007)

=== Singles ===
- 'All My Love' (2006)
- 'Late Night Shopping Spree' (2007)
- 'Sweet Tooth' (2007)
- 'Piece of My Heart' (2007)
