= In Public =

Single by Kelis featuring Nas

from the album Tasty
- Released: April 4, 2005
- Recorded: 2003
- Studio: Mirror Image Recorders (New York City)
- Length: 4:25
- Label: Virgin
- Songwriter(s): Dana Stinson; Kelis Rogers
- Producer(s): Rockwilder

Kelis singles chronology
"Millionaire" (2004)	"In Public" (2005)	"Bossy" (2006)

Nas singles chronology
"Just a Moment" (2005)	"In Public" (2005)	"Road to Zion" (2005)

"In Public" is a song by American singer Kelis, featuring American rapper Nas, taken from the former's third studio album, Tasty (2003). It was released as the album's fourth and final single on April 4, 2005. Kelis co-wrote the song with its producer, Rockwilder.

Like previous singles "Trick Me" and "Millionaire", "In Public" was not released in the United States as Kelis' American label Arista had folded. Although no music video was filmed for the song, it managed to reach number 17 on the UK Singles Chart. The track was originally due to be released as a double A-side single with the track "Glow", although this did not happen and a reason for the change has never been given.

== Critical reception ==
"In Public" was met with mixed reviews from music critics. Adam Webb of Yahoo! Music cited the song as one of Tasty's highlights, stating that it "espouses the delights of al fresco sex over a clinical electro beat and features a filthy rap courtesy of new husband Nas. Suffice to say it leaves Beyoncé and Jay-Z sounding like Mary Whitehouse and Cliff Richard." Conversely, Andy Kellman of AllMusic viewed the track as one of the album's "miscues thwarting perfection" and advised listeners to skip past it.

The Guardian's Dorian Lynskey described the song as "an eyebrow-raisingly explicit duet." The Independent opined, "For his part, Nas appears rather more flustered than he ever did in his accounts of life as a dope-dealing streetwise hustler." Pitchfork reviewer Scott Plagenhoef felt that the song is "possibly the low-point of what is often a transparent Beyoncé-aping full-length (starting with the cover art, which bears a striking resemblance to that of the "Crazy in Love" single)." Ernest Hardy of Rolling Stone commented that on "In Public", Kelis sounds like "Donna Summer with an action plan".

== Commercial performance ==
"In Public" debuted and peaked at number 17 on the UK Singles Chart for the week ending April 16, 2005, ending Kelis' string of UK top-five singles. In Ireland, the single debuted and peaked at number 22 on the Irish Singles Chart on April 7, 2005. It also reached number 54 on the European Hot 100 Singles chart on April 23, 2005.

== Track listing ==
- CD single
1. "In Public" (radio edit) – 3:22
2. "Trick Me" – 3:26

== Credits and personnel ==
Credits adapted from the liner notes of Tasty.

=== Recording ===
- Recorded at Mirror Image Recorders (New York City)
- Mixed at Enterprise Studios (Burbank, California)
- Mastered at Sterling Sound (New York City)

=== Personnel ===
- Kelis – vocals
- Nas – vocals
- Rockwilder – production
- Mike Koch – recording
- Dave Pensado – mixing
- Chris Athens – mastering

== Charts ==
Chart (2005)	Peak position
Belgium (Ultratip Bubbling Under Flanders)	6
Belgium (Ultratip Bubbling Under Wallonia)	11
Europe (European Hot 100 Singles)	54
Ireland (IRMA)	22
Scotland (OCC)	26
UK Singles (OCC)	17
UK Hip Hop/R&B (OCC)	7

== Release history ==
Region	Date	Format	Label	Ref.
United Kingdom	April 4, 2005	CD single	Virgin	
Germany	April 18, 2005	CD single	EMI	
