= Millionaire (Kelis song) =

2004 single by Kelis and André 3000

Single by Kelis featuring André 3000

from the album Tasty
- Released: October 18, 2004
- Studio: Stankonia Recording and DARP (Atlanta, Georgia)
- Genre: Synth-funk; electronica; swing pop
- Length: 3:44
- Label: Virgin
- Songwriters: André Benjamin; Kelis Rogers; Douglas Davis; Ricky Walters
- Producer: André 3000

Kelis singles chronology
"Trick Me" (2004)	"Millionaire" (2004)	"In Public" (2005)

André 3000 singles chronology
"Millionaire" (2004)	"Royal Flush" (2008)

"Millionaire" is a song by American singer Kelis, featuring American rapper André 3000, taken from the former's third studio album, Tasty (2003). Released as the album's third single on October 18, 2004, the song was written by Kelis and André 3000, produced by the latter, and contains a sample of the 1985 song "La Di Da Di" by Doug E. Fresh and Slick Rick. Like Kelis' previous single "Trick Me", "Millionaire" was not released in the United States due to her American label Arista's restructuring. The song peaked at number three on the UK Singles Chart, earning Kelis her third consecutive top-five single, while becoming a modest commercial success internationally. The accompanying music video, directed by Giuseppe Capotondi, does not feature Kelis or André 3000, but instead features children appearing as the duo's younger selves.

== Commercial performance ==
"Millionaire" debuted at number three on the UK Singles Chart, becoming Kelis' third consecutive top-five entry from Tasty. The song performed moderately in the rest of Europe, reaching number eight in Ireland, number 11 in Finland, number 36 in Belgium, number 43 in Switzerland, and number 50 in Sweden. In Oceania, the single charted at number 23 in Australia and at number 27 in New Zealand.

== Track listings ==
- UK CD 1 and German CD single
1. "Millionaire" (radio edit) – 3:45
2. "Millionaire" (instrumental) – 3:45
- UK CD 2 and Australian CD single
1. "Millionaire" (radio edit) – 3:45
2. "Millionaire" (instrumental) – 3:45
3. "Trick Me" (Tiefschwarz Special Trick Remix) – 7:33
4. "Millionaire" (video)
5. "Trick Me" (video)
- UK 12-inch single

A1. "Millionaire" (radio edit) – 3:45
A2. "In Public" (featuring Nas) – 4:25
B1. "Trick Me" (E-Smoove House Trick) – 7:42

== Credits and personnel ==
Credits adapted from the liner notes of Tasty.

=== Recording ===
- Recorded at Stankonia Recording and DARP Studios (Atlanta, Georgia)
- Mixed at Sony Music Studios (New York City)
- Mastered at Sterling Sound (New York City)

=== Personnel ===
- Kelis – vocals
- André 3000 – vocals, production, drums, music programming, keyboards
- Matthew Still – recording
- Vincent Alexander – recording
- James Majors – recording
- Carlton Lynn – recording
- Warren Bletcher – recording assistance
- Doug Harms – recording assistance
- Dexter Simmons – mixing
- Andrew Dawson – mixing assistance
- Kevin Kendricks – keyboards, piano
- Regina Davenport – production coordination
- Chris Athens – mastering

== Charts ==
=== Weekly charts ===
Chart (2004)	Peak position
Australia (ARIA)	23
Australian Urban (ARIA)	7
Austria (Ö3 Austria Top 40)	69
Belgium (Ultratop 50 Flanders)	36
Belgium (Ultratip Bubbling Under Wallonia)	9
Europe (European Hot 100 Singles)	8
Finland (Suomen virallinen lista)	11
Germany (GfK)	65
Greece (IFPI Greece)	29
Ireland (IRMA)	8
Italy (FIMI)	36
Netherlands (Dutch Top 40 Tipparade)	3
Netherlands (Single Top 100)	37
New Zealand (Recorded Music NZ)	27
Scotland Singles (OCC)	8
Sweden (Sverigetopplistan)	50
Switzerland (Schweizer Hitparade)	43
UK Singles (OCC)	3
UK Hip Hop/R&B (OCC)	1

=== Year-end charts ===
Chart (2004)	Position
UK Singles (OCC)	89

== Certifications ==
Region	Certification	Certified units/sales
New Zealand (RMNZ)	Gold	15,000^{‡}
United Kingdom (BPI)	Gold	400,000^{‡}
^{‡} Sales+streaming figures based on certification alone.

== Release history ==
Region	Date	Format	Label	Ref(s)
United Kingdom	October 18, 2004	CD single; 12-inch single	Virgin	
Germany	October 18, 2004	CD single	EMI	
Australia	November 22, 2004	CD single	EMI	
