= Just a Little Bit (Kids of 88 song) =

Single by Kids of 88

from the album Sugarpills
- Released: 15 February 2010
- Genre: Electropop
- Length: 3:00
- Label: Dryden St
- Songwriter(s): Sam McCarthy, Joel Little

Kids of 88 singles chronology
"My House" (2009)	"Just a Little Bit" (2010)	"Downtown" (2010)

Music video
- "Just a Little Bit" on YouTube

"Just a Little Bit" is the second single from electropop band Kids of 88 (Jordan Arts and Sam McCarthy). This song was released digitally through the New Zealand iTunes Store on 15 February 2010.

== History ==
- The song was first heard before it was released on a Glassons New Zealand television commercial, entitled Wonderland. It is now, just like their first single "My House", heard on a C4 television commercial.
- This song won "Single of the Year" at the 2010 Vodafone New Zealand Music Awards, also alongside "Music Video of the Year" with Tim Van Dammen.
- The song was featured on the 5 June 2011 pilot episode of MTV's Teen Wolf.
- The song was again featured on MTV's Teen Wolf in the 8 August 2011 episode entitled "Formality". The Kids of 88 played the song during their on screen set as the live band performing at the Beacon Hills formal.
- The song is also featured in an Australian TV commercial for the Holden Malibu car.
- The song was briefly featured in the trailer for the 2013 coming-of-age drama "The Spectacular Now", starring Miles Teller and Shailene Woodley.

== Charts ==
This song debuted on the New Zealand charts at number 13 and peaked at 11.

Chart (2010)	Peak position	Sales
New Zealand Singles Chart	11	7,500+
