= My House (Kids of 88 song) =

Single by Kids of 88
- Released: 20 April 2009
- Genre: Alternative dance; indie pop; electropop
- Length: 3:58
- Label: Dryden St
- Songwriter(s): Joel Little, Sam McCarthy

Kids of 88 singles chronology
"My House" (2009)	"Just a Little Bit" (2010)

"My House" is the first single from electropop band Kids of 88. It was released on 20 April 2009. The song was on the New Zealand Singles Chart for 17 weeks in 2009, peaking at #3.

== History ==
When the New Zealand music television channel C4 used "My House" on one of its advertising campaigns, the song quickly became very popular in New Zealand, and peaked at #3 on the New Zealand Top 40 singles chart in June 2009. Kids of 88 describe it as "a cross between a late 80s police drama intro theme and a sophisticated super hussy". The song was certified Gold after eight weeks on the chart, selling over 7,500 copies.

== Charts ==
Chart (2009)	Peak position	Sales
New Zealand Singles Chart	3	15,000+ (platinum)

=== Year-end charts ===
Chart (2009)	Ranking
New Zealand Singles Chart	32
