= Rival State =

Alternative rock band

- Origin: New Plymouth, New Zealand
- Genres: Alternative rock; rock; grunge
- Years active: 2002–present
- Members: Salvi Stone; Jo Einarsson; Stefan Einarsson; Valdimar Einarsson; Nimal Fernando
- Website: www.rivalstate.net

Rival State is an alternative rock band based out of London, United Kingdom, which formed in New Plymouth, New Zealand in 2002. The band consists of members Salvi Stone, Nimal Fernando, Jo Einarsson, Stefan Einarsson and Valdi Einarsson.

The band released their debut album Apollo Me on 12 October 2012 in New Zealand, where it reached No 1 on the Top 20 New Zealand Album Charts and No 10 on the New Zealand Top 40 Album Charts.

In 2014 the band relocated to London, where they released their Youth Tax EP on 22 October 2014.

== Discography ==
=== Studio albums ===
Year	Album	Chart positions	
Year	Album	NZ Top 40 Albums Chart	Top 20 NZ Albums Chart
2012	Apollo Me: New Zealand Release; Released: 12 October 2012; Label: Shock Records; Format: CD, digital download	10	1

=== EPs ===
- Gutter Mouth EP (2015)
- Youth Tax EP (2014)

=== Singles ===
- "Impulses" (2016)
- "Modern Living" (2015)
- "Keepsake" (2015)
- "Sleep Talker" (2014)
- "Aces" (2014)

== Band members ==
Current Band Members

- Nimal Fernando – guitar, backing vocals (2002 – present)
- Jo Einarsson – guitar (2002 – present)
- Stefan Einarsson – bass guitar (2002 – present)
- Valdimar Einarsson – drums (2012 – present)
- Salvi Stone – Lead vocalist (2016–present)

Ex Band Members

- Luke Van Hoof – lead vocals, guitar (2005 – 2015)
