= Sam McCarthy (singer) =

New Zealand songwriter and vocalist

- Also known as: Boyboy
- Born: Auckland, New Zealand
- Origin: Auckland, New Zealand
- Occupations: Songwriter, singer, guitarist
- Years active: 2004–present

Sam McCarthy is a New Zealand songwriter and pop vocalist. He is best known for his work in Kids of 88 and Goodnight Nurse.

== Early life ==
McCarthy was brought up in Auckland in the suburb of Weymouth. He was educated at Weymouth Primary School and St Peter's College. He and Jordan Arts met at St Peter's and quickly realised that they were on the same wavelength. They were in the same English class.

McCarthy has said: "As an icebreaking exercise we were told to bring in our favourite song. Everyone brought in Limp Bizkit, but the thing that linked Jordan and myself is that we were wanky enough to bring in Jimi Hendrix songs. We were both trying to be as cool as possible so we rummaged through our parents' CD collection as opposed to our own".

With Jordan Arts, David Wong, Graham Scherer and Michael Pomare, McCarthy was a member of "Incursa", a St Peter's College band which won the Smokefreerockquest in 2004.

== Career ==
Members from Incursa went on to form punk icons False Start and Goodnight Nurse, which McCarthy still belongs to as a guitarist. Arts and McCarthy then formed Kids of 88. In releasing the first Kids of 88 album, Sugarpills, McCarthy said that the duo tried to produce a variety of material rather than just the familiarly slutty "My House" and "Just A Little Bit" (released earlier as singles). Their style is broadly a fusion of electropop and 1980's style dance music. They describe it as "a cross between a late 80's police drama intro theme and a sophisticated super hussy". A reviewer has said "while reminiscent of early 80s synthpop, they aren't a direct copy of their antecedents. There's also a touch of 2010 punk swagger and adrenaline, where dance can't ignore what's been achieved in R&B and hip-hop". McCarthy and Arts produced the album themselves and worked with a simple technical set-up out of a bedroom. At the 2010 New Zealand Music Awards, Kids of 88 won "Single of the Year" and (with Tim Van Dammen) "Music Video of the Year" for their single Just a Little Bit.

In 2013, McCarthy wrote and recorded "Don't Let Me Go" with Harry Styles, from One Direction.

In 2016, McCarthy began recording electropop music under the pseudonym BOYBOY. He released three songs, "Boy", "None of Your Love" and VIces".

== Discography ==
=== Albums ===
==== With Goodnight Nurse ====
- Always and Never (2006) Festival
- Keep Me on Your Side (2008) Warner

==== With Kids of 88 ====
- Sugarpills (2010) Dryden Street/Sony Music
- Modern Love (2012) Dryden Street/Sony Music

=== Singles ===
Year	Single	Peak chart positions	Album
Year	Single	NZ	Album
2015	"Team Ball Player Thing" (#KiwisCureBatten)	2	Non-album single
"—" denotes releases that did not chart or were not released in that country.

==== With Incursa ====
- "Find Out" (2004)

== Awards and nominations ==
Year	Nominee / work	Award	Result
2006	Goodnight Nurse	New Zealand Music Awards – People's Choice Award	Nominated
2009	Kids of 88/"My House"	New Zealand Music Awards – Single of the Year	Nominated
2010	Kids of 88/"Just a Little Bit"	New Zealand Music Awards – Single of the Year	Won
2010	Kids of 88	New Zealand Music Awards – People's Choice Award	Nominated
