= Milkshake (song) =

2003 single by Kelis

Single by Kelis

from the album Tasty
- Released: August 25, 2003
- Studio: Hovercraft (Virginia Beach, Virginia)
- Genre: R&B; dance
- Length: 3:04
- Label: Star Trak; Arista
- Songwriters: Pharrell Williams; Chad Hugo
- Producer: The Neptunes

Kelis singles chronology
"Finest Dreams" (2003)	"Milkshake" (2003)	"Not in Love" (2004)

Music video
- "Milkshake" on YouTube

"Milkshake" is a song by American singer Kelis from her third studio album, Tasty (2003). Written and produced by the Neptunes, it was released as the lead single from Tasty in the United States on August 25, 2003, by Star Trak and Arista Records, and internationally on November 24, 2003. According to Kelis, "milkshake" in the song is used as a metaphor for "something that makes women special". The song is noted for its euphemistic chorus and low-beat R&B sound.

"Milkshake" peaked at number three on the Billboard Hot 100, becoming Kelis' highest-charting song to date. Outside of the United States, "Milkshake" topped the charts in Ireland, and peaked within the top ten of the charts in Australia, Denmark, Netherlands, New Zealand, Norway, Sweden, and the United Kingdom. "Milkshake" was certified Gold in the United States, where it has sold 883,000 paid downloads. The song was nominated for a Grammy Award for Best Urban/Alternative Performance in 2004.

In 2023, Kelis released "Milkshake 20" (Alex Wann Remix), which she co-produced.

== Background ==
"Milkshake" was written and produced by Pharrell Williams and Chad Hugo, known collectively as the Neptunes. The song was conceived when Tasty was chosen as the album's title. When making the song, Kelis "knew right away that it was a really good song", and she wanted it to be the album's first single. Recording sessions took place at Hovercraft Studios in Virginia Beach, Virginia. Phil Tan mixed the recordings at Right Track Studios in New York City.

When asked about the meaning of the song, Kelis told The Observer that "It means whatever people want it to; it was just a word we came up with on a whim, but then the song took on a life of its own." However, in an interview with the Associated Press, she likened one's milkshake to one's self-confidence: "A milkshake is the thing that makes women special. It's what gives us our confidence and what makes us exciting." Later in 2018, Doja Cat released the song "Mooo!", in which its bridge samples this song, with the word "yard", as an example, being replaced with "farm".

== Composition ==
"Milkshake" is an R&B song, and Joey Rivaldo of About.com described it as a "low beat dance song". The song is noted for its chorus, in which Kelis sings "My milkshake brings all the boys to the yard". The line was referred to as a "sexy, euphemistic playground rap" by MTV News. The song's riff was described as "blaring synth-funk". Unlike many urban pop songs, which rely on drum machines, the beat consists of a lone darbuka playing a rhythm similar to a belly dance. A manjira sample resembling an order-up counter bell is used throughout the song. Andy Kellman of AllMusic compared the song's suggestive lyrics to "Nasty Girl" by Vanity 6, "In My House" by Mary Jane Girls and "Touch It" by Monifah.

== Critical reception ==
"Milkshake" received critical acclaim upon its release, both for its production as well as Kelis' vocal performance. About.com's Joey Rivaldo rated the song four out of five stars, and stated: "Clearly this is the case of my milkshake is better than yours, so grab yours quick, or we'll have to charge." While reviewing the soundtrack to the film Mean Girls (2004), in which "Milkshake" is featured, Heather Phares of AllMusic wrote that the song describes "the movie's playfully menacing undercurrent", and called the song "fantastic", and that it is "basically a three-minute tutorial in sex appeal." Rollie Pemberton of Pitchfork called the song "brilliant", and said: "Equal parts cantina gyration and future-funk, Kelis plays the coquette, enticing the entire American male populace with rhythmic coos while simultaneously providing an apt tutorial for aspiring temptresses." Bjorn Randolph of Stylus Magazine said that the song "may well be remembered as their [the Neptunes'] masterpiece".

Mark Danson of Contactmusic.com was not very fond of the song, criticizing the Neptunes' sound, and said: "as it sounds like [Pharrell] Williams has done this one in his sleep, it'll probably slip under the radar unless it has a fairly decent video to back it up. It's obviously supposed to be a kind of sexy electronica, but it just ends up sounding slack." Tony Naylor of NME called the song "probably the oddest track" on the Tasty album. Adam Webb of Yahoo! Music UK said that the song "nestles in seamlessly, the rhythm as relentless as a parade of majorettes with Kelis upfront as the cheerleader." Neil Drumming of Entertainment Weekly called the song a "lusty party anthem". Ernest Hardy of Rolling Stone called it "the superfreakiest song on the charts", Sal Cinquemani of Slant Magazine called it "thick and creamy", Steve Jones of USA Today called it "saucy", and Dorian Lynskey of The Guardian said that in the song "Kelis exploits her husky croon like never before, pouring it over lascivious double entendre."

The Observer named the song the best single of 2004. In 2004, Pitchfork made a list of the top 50 singles of 2003 and listed the song at number eight. In 2005, Pitchfork made a list of the top 100 singles of 2000–2004, listing "Milkshake" at number 21. Stylus Magazine named the song the 13th-best single of 2000–2005. In September 2011, VH1 ranked the song at number 61 on its list of the "100 Greatest Songs of the '00s". In October 2011, NME placed it at number 136 on its list "150 Best Tracks of the Past 15 Years".

In 2004, "Milkshake" was nominated for a Grammy Award for Best Urban/Alternative Performance.

== Commercial performance ==
"Milkshake" debuted at number 73 on the September 6, 2003, chart of the Billboard Hot R&B/Hip-Hop Songs chart, and peaked at number four on January 3, 2004. In October 2003, it debuted at number 95 on the Billboard Hot 100 chart. It was Kelis' second entry on the chart, following "Caught out There", which spent 12 weeks on the chart between December 1999 and February 2000. In its 13th week on the chart, "Milkshake" reached its peak of number three, and stayed there for five consecutive weeks. The song charted on the Hot 100 for 22 weeks, and was certified Gold by the Recording Industry Association of America (RIAA) on October 25, 2004. "Milkshake" also spent a week atop the Hot Dance Club Songs chart in December 2003. The song has sold 883,000 paid digital downloads in the United States, according to Nielsen SoundScan. It was listed at number 41 on the 2004 Hot 100 year-end chart, and number 41 on the Hot R&B/Hip-Hop Songs year-end chart.

In Ireland, "Milkshake" debuted at number 15 on the Irish Singles Chart, and later topped the chart for five consecutive weeks.

In the United Kingdom, "Milkshake" peaked at number two on the UK Singles Chart, where it remained for four consecutive weeks, and has been certified Platinum by the British Phonographic Industry (BPI).

Elsewhere in Europe, "Milkshake" also peaked within the top ten of the charts in Denmark, the Netherlands, Norway, and Sweden.

In Australia, "Milkshake" peaked at number two on the ARIA Singles Chart for five non-consecutive weeks and has been certified Platinum by the Australian Recording Industry Association (ARIA).

In New Zealand, "Milkshake" peaked at number three on the New Zealand Singles Chart and has been certified Platinum by Recorded Music NZ (RMNZ).

== Music video ==
The music video for "Milkshake" was directed by Jake Nava. In the video, Kelis enters a diner called Tasty's Yard. She dances suggestively, and puts her lips around a cherry, which causes a mother to cover her child's eyes. A cook, played by rapper Nas, starts delivering milkshakes to the customers while Kelis dances. A milkshake machine then starts spurting milkshake all over the customers, and more and more people enter the "yard". FHM named the music video the 73rd sexiest music video by a female performer of all time and commented: "Here she's backed up by a posse of dancers wearing tiny diner uniforms. The way she sucks a milkshake and bites a cherry is just unfairly sexy", and said that the best part is when Kelis demonstrates a "perfect bending-over-oven technique".

== Legacy ==
In 2025, the song was featured on Gap's Fall 2025 campaign called "Better in Denim" featuring global girl group Katseye. The campaign has received positive reviews among advertising pundits and fans alike.

== Track listings ==
- UK CD single
1. "Milkshake" – 3:05
2. "Milkshake" (X-Press 2 Triple Thick Vocal Mix Edit) – 6:49
- UK enhanced CD single
1. "Milkshake" – 3:05
2. "Milkshake" (X-Press 2 Triple Thick Vocal Mix) – 9:30
3. "Milkshake" (DJ Zinc Remix) – 5:59
4. "Milkshake" (Freq Nasty's Hip Hall Mix) – 6:24
5. "Milkshake" (Tom Neville Mix) – 6:26
6. "Milkshake" (music video) – 3:11
- Australian and German CD maxi single
1. "Milkshake" – 3:05
2. "Milkshake" (X-Press 2 Triple Thick Vocal Mix) – 9:30
3. "Milkshake" (DJ Zinc Remix) – 5:59
4. "Milkshake" (Freq Nasty's Hip Hall Mix) – 6:24
5. "Milkshake" (Tom Neville Remix) – 6:26
- US 12-inch single

A1. "Milkshake" (Radio Mix) – 3:05
A2. "Milkshake" (Instrumental) – 3:05
B1. "Milkshake" (Radio Mix) – 3:05
B2. "Milkshake" (Acappella) – 2:57

- US 7-inch single

A. "Milkshake" (Radio Mix) – 3:05
B. "Milkshake" (Instrumental) – 3:05

- UK 12-inch single

A1. "Milkshake" – 3:05
A2. "Milkshake" (X-Press 2 Triple Thick Vocal Mix) – 9:30
B1. "Milkshake" (Tom Neville Remix) – 6:24
B2. "Milkshake" (X-Press 2 Triple Thick Dub [With Extra Cream]) – 9:30

- Digital download
1. "Milkshake" – 3:05
- Digital download – Radio Mix
1. "Milkshake" (Radio Mix featuring Pharrell and Pusha T) – 4:46
2. "Milkshake" (Instrumental) – 4:41

== Personnel ==
Credits adapted from the liner notes of Tasty.

=== Recording ===
- Recorded at Hovercraft Studios (Virginia Beach, Virginia)
- Mixed at Right Track Studios (New York City)
- Mastered at Sterling Sound (New York City)

=== Personnel ===
- The Neptunes – production
- Andrew "Drew" Coleman – recording
- Daniel Betancourt – recording assistance
- Phil Tan – mixing
- Tim Olmstead – mixing assistance
- Chris Athens – mastering

== Charts ==
=== Weekly charts ===
Weekly chart performance for "Milkshake"
Chart (2003–2004)	Peak position
Australia (ARIA)	2
Australian Urban (ARIA)	1
Austria (Ö3 Austria Top 40)	38
Belgium (Ultratop 50 Flanders)	10
Belgium (Ultratop 50 Wallonia)	33
Canada (Nielsen SoundScan)	40
Canada CHR (Nielsen BDS)	4
Croatia International (HRT)	4
Denmark (Tracklisten)	4
Europe (European Hot 100 Singles)	3
Finland (Suomen virallinen lista)	12
France (SNEP)	52
Germany (GfK)	22
Greece (IFPI)	13
Ireland (IRMA)	1
Italy (FIMI)	20
Netherlands (Dutch Top 40)	6
Netherlands (Single Top 100)	7
New Zealand (Recorded Music NZ)	3
Norway (VG-lista)	5
Scottish Singles Sales (Official Charts)	2
Sweden (Sverigetopplistan)	5
Switzerland (Schweizer Hitparade)	22
UK Singles (Official Charts)	2
UK Hip Hop/R&B (Official Charts)	1
US Billboard Hot 100	3
US Dance Club Songs (Billboard)	1
US Dance Airplay (Billboard)	5
US Hot R&B/Hip-Hop Songs (Billboard)	4
US Pop Airplay (Billboard)	8
US Rhythmic Airplay (Billboard)	1

=== Year-end charts ===
Year-end chart performance for "Milkshake"
Chart (2004)	Position
Australia (ARIA)	4
Australian Urban (ARIA)	1
Belgium (Ultratop Flanders)	66
Ireland (IRMA)	4
Netherlands (Dutch Top 40)	62
Netherlands (Single Top 100)	53
New Zealand (RIANZ)	27
Sweden (Hitlistan)	47
UK Singles (OCC)	14
UK Urban (Music Week)	37
US Billboard Hot 100	41
US Dance Radio Airplay (Billboard)	41
US Hot R&B/Hip-Hop Singles & Tracks (Billboard)	40
US Mainstream Top 40 (Billboard)	57
US Rhythmic Top 40 (Billboard)	26

=== Decade-end charts ===
Decade-end chart performance for "Milkshake"
Chart (2000–2009)	Position
Australia (ARIA)	87

== Certifications ==
Certifications and sales for "Milkshake"
Region	Certification	Certified units/sales
Australia (ARIA)	Platinum	70,000^{^}
Denmark (IFPI Danmark)	Gold	45,000^{‡}
New Zealand (RMNZ)	2× Platinum	60,000^{‡}
United Kingdom (BPI)	Platinum	600,000^{‡}
United States (RIAA)	Gold	883,000
United States (RIAA) Mastertone	Gold	500,000^{*}
^{*} Sales figures based on certification alone.^{^} Shipments figures based on certification alone.^{‡} Sales+streaming figures based on certification alone.

== Release history ==
Release dates and formats for "Milkshake"
Region	Date	Format	Version	Label	Ref(s)
United States	August 25, 2003	Digital download	Instrumental	Star Trak; Arista	
United States	August 26, 2003	12-inch single	Radio Mix	Star Trak; Arista	
United States	September 15, 2003	Rhythmic contemporary radio; urban contemporary radio	Original	Star Trak; Arista	
Australia	November 24, 2003	Digital download	Original	EMI	
New Zealand	November 24, 2003	Digital download	Original	EMI	
Sweden	November 24, 2003	Digital download	Original	EMI	
United Kingdom	November 24, 2003	Digital download	Original	Virgin	
United States	December 29, 2003	Digital download	Radio Mix	Star Trak; Arista	
United Kingdom	January 5, 2004	CD single; enhanced CD single; 12-inch single	Original	Virgin	
Australia	January 12, 2004	CD maxi single	Original	EMI	
Germany	February 2, 2004	CD maxi single	Original	EMI	
United States	March 30, 2004	7-inch single	Radio Mix	Star Trak; Arista	
