= Kelis discography =

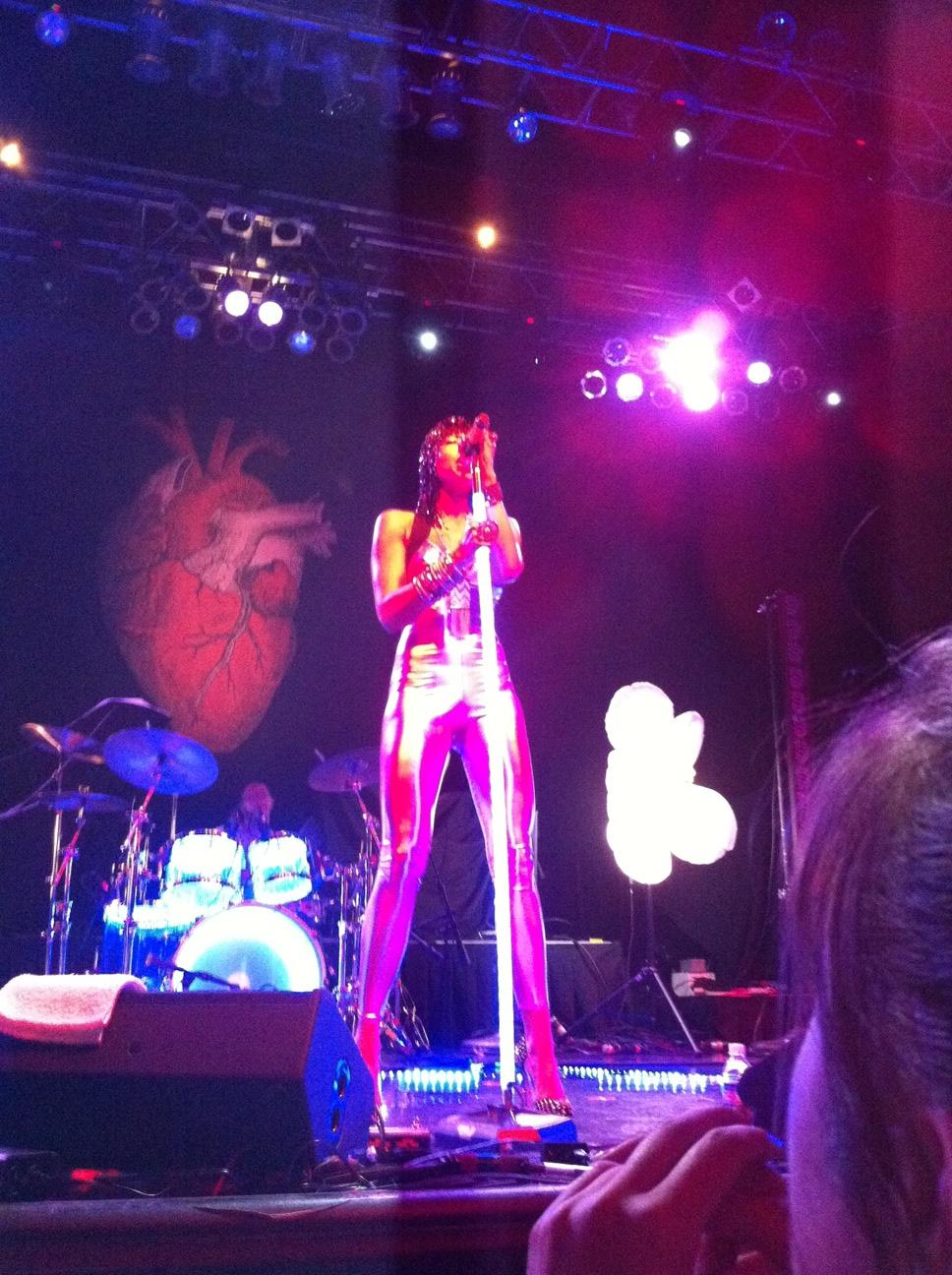
- Kelis performing at House of Blues in Boston, July 2010
- Studio albums: 6
- Live albums: 1
- Compilation albums: 1
- Singles: 41
- Music videos: 29

American singer Kelis has released six studio albums, one live album, one compilation album, 41 singles (including 21 as a featured artist), and 29 music videos. At age 16, she left her parents' home; at the age of 20 she was signed to Virgin Records. Her debut single, "Caught Out There", was released in 1999, reaching number 54 on the Billboard Hot 100 and number four on the UK Singles Chart in the United Kingdom. Her debut album, Kaleidoscope, was released in December 1999 and charted at number 144 on the Billboard 200, and has sold 249,000 copies in the country to date. In the United Kingdom, it was certified gold and has sold over 167,000 copies. Two more singles were released from the album: "Good Stuff" which reached the UK top twenty and "Get Along with You" which failed to chart in the US and charted poorly in the UK. In 2001, her second studio album, Wanderland, was released and featured similar "raw emotion and sophisticated musicianship" of her debut album. The album was not released in the United States, however, and the only single, "Young, Fresh n' New", charted poorly.

In 2003, she signed with Arista Records and released the single "Milkshake". The song reached number three on the US Billboard Hot 100, becoming her best-charting single to date. The song was the lead single for the album Tasty, which was released in December 2003. Arista later folded (although it would be relaunched in 2018) and Kelis was transferred to Jive Records. In Europe, she was still signed to Virgin, and singles continued to be released there. Tasty was certified gold in the United States, becoming Kelis's first album to be certified by the Recording Industry Association of America. It has sold 535,000 copies in the US to date. In 2006, her next album, Kelis Was Here, was released on Jive Records. The album was preceded by the lead single, "Bossy". The single was certified double platinum in the US and reached the top twenty of the US Hot 100. The album debuted at number ten on the US Billboard 200 and has sold 160,000 copies in the United States to date. The album's third single, "Lil Star", features Cee-Lo Green, and reached number three in the UK and number eight in Ireland.

In late 2007, Jive dropped Kelis, and she signed to Interscope Records and will.i.am Music Group in 2009. She released her fifth studio album, Flesh Tone, in May 2010. The album saw Kelis departing from her previous R&B sound, and adapting a new dance sound. The album was preceded by the lead single, "Acapella", and spawned three singles that achieved moderate success in the charts; "4th of July (Fireworks)", "Scream" and "Brave". In 2011, Kelis began work on the follow-up to Flesh Tone, however, she left Interscope and signed to Federal Prism, before officially signing to the British independent label Ninja Tune for the release of Food. The album was released on April 18, 2014, and is an R&B and soul album with a diverse musical style that incorporates funk, Afrobeat, Memphis soul, R&B and neo-soul. Its songs feature crackling horns, brass, earthy guitars, simmering electronics and vocals from Kelis that were noted as being breathy, smoky and sultry. The album was viewed as a return to Kelis's previous music prior to Flesh Tone, and was described by her as "a kind of unspoken lovefest". In September 2023, Kelis released "Milkshake 20" (Alex Wann Remix); Kelis resung the lyrics and co-produced the single.

== Albums ==
=== Studio albums ===
List of studio albums, with selected chart positions, sales figures and certifications
Title	Details	Peak chart positions										Sales	Certifications
Title	Details	US	AUS	FRA	GER	IRE	NL	NZ	SWE	SWI	UK	Sales	Certifications
Kaleidoscope	Released: December 7, 1999; Label: Virgin; Format: CD, cassette, LP, digital download	144	136	—	73	—	50	46	47	92	43	US: 249,000; UK: 167,000	BPI: Gold
Wanderland	Released: October 17, 2001; Label: Virgin; Format: CD, cassette, LP, digital download	—	—	133	—	—	—	—	—	79	78	UK: 17,000	
Tasty	Released: December 5, 2003; Label: Star Trak, Arista; Format: CD, cassette, LP, digital download	27	41	60	51	15	16	48	48	14	11	US: 535,000; UK: 476,034	RIAA: Gold; ARIA: Gold; BPI: Platinum
Kelis Was Here	Released: August 22, 2006; Label: Jive; Formats: CD, digital download	10	96	104	77	—	82	—	51	22	41	US: 160,000; UK: 32,083	BPI: Silver
Flesh Tone	Released: May 14, 2010; Label: will.i.am, Interscope; Formats: CD, digital download	48	162	132	61	54	81	—	—	49	46	US: 36,000	
Food	Released: April 18, 2014; Label: Ninja Tune; Formats: CD, LP, digital download	73	112	145	81	—	94	—	—	32	20		
"—" denotes a recording that did not chart or was not released in that territory.

=== Live albums ===
Title	Details
Live in London	Released: November 24, 2014; Label: Concert Live, Ninja Tune; Formats: CD, LP, digital download
Live from Metropolis Studios	Released: August 28, 2015; Label: Music on vinyl, Ninja Tune; Formats: LP

=== Compilation albums ===
List of compilation albums, with selected chart positions
Title	Details	Peaks	Certifications
Title	Details	UK	Certifications
The Hits	Released: March 1, 2008; Label: Jive, Legacy; Formats: CD, digital download	71	BPI: Gold

== Singles ==
=== As lead artist ===
List of singles as lead artist, with selected chart positions and certifications, showing year released and album name
Title	Year	Peak chart positions										Certifications	Album
Title	Year	US	US R&B	AUS	GER	IRE	NL	NZ	SWE	SWI	UK	Certifications	Album
"Caught Out There"	1999	54	9	26	40	23	4	32	10	35	4	BPI: Silver	Kaleidoscope
"Get Along with You"	2000	—	57	—	—	—	93	—	—	—	51		Kaleidoscope
"Good Stuff" (featuring Terrar)	2000	—	—	132	72	49	78	—	44	74	19		Kaleidoscope
"Young, Fresh n' New"	2001	—	—	—	—	—	89	—	—	—	32		Wanderland
"Milkshake"	2003	3	4	2	22	1	7	3	5	22	2	RIAA: Gold; ARIA: Platinum; BPI: Platinum; RMNZ: 2× Platinum	Tasty
"Trick Me"	2004	—	— (Note: "Trick Me" did not enter the Hot R&B/Hip-Hop Songs chart, but peaked at number seven on the Bubbling Under R&B/Hip-Hop Singles chart.)	5	10	4	4	3	24	8	2	ARIA: Platinum; BPI: Gold; RMNZ: Platinum	Tasty
"Millionaire" (featuring André 3000)	2004	—	—	23	65	8	37	27	50	43	3	BPI: Gold; RMNZ: Gold	Tasty
"In Public" (featuring Nas)	2005	—	—	—	—	22	—	—	—	—	17		Tasty
"Bossy" (featuring Too Short)	2006	16	11	18	64	21	72	15	39	41	22	RIAA: 2× Platinum; RMNZ: Gold	Kelis Was Here
"Blindfold Me" (featuring Nas)	2006	—	91	—	—	—	—	—	—	—	—		Kelis Was Here
"Lil Star" (featuring Cee-Lo)	2007	—	—	—	99	8	95	—	—	—	3		Kelis Was Here
"Acapella"	2010	—	—	169	21	17	12	—	—	61	5	BPI: Silver	Flesh Tone
"4th of July (Fireworks)"	2010	—	—	—	—	—	—	—	—	—	32		Flesh Tone
"Scream"	2010	—	—	—	—	—	—	—	—	—	168		Flesh Tone
"Brave"	2011	—	—	—	—	—	—	—	—	—	—		Flesh Tone
"Jerk Ribs"	2014	—	—	—	—	—	—	—	—	—	—		Food
"Rumble"	2014	—	—	—	—	—	—	—	—	—	—		Food
"Friday Fish Fry"	2014	—	—	—	—	—	—	—	—	—	—		Food
“Midnight Snacks”	2021	—	—	—	—	—	—	—	—	—	—		Non-album singles
“Feed Them”	2022	—	—	—	—	—	—	—	—	—	—		Non-album singles
"Milkshake (Kelis' version)"	2025	—	—	—	—	—	—	—	—	—	—		Non-album singles
"—" denotes a recording that did not chart or was not released in that territory.

=== As featured artist ===
List of singles as featured artist, with selected chart positions, showing year released and album name
Title	Year	Peak chart positions										Certifications	Album
Title	Year	US	US R&B	AUS	FRA	GER	IRE	NZ	SWE	SWI	UK	Certifications	Album
"Got Your Money" (Ol' Dirty Bastard featuring Kelis)	1999	33	19	—	82	—	39	—	—	—	11	BPI: Gold; RMNZ: Platinum	Nigga Please
"Honey" (Moby featuring Kelis)	2000	—	—	56	—	—	—	—	—	—	17		Non-album single
"Supa Love" (Guru featuring Kelis)	2001	—	—	—	—	—	—	—	—	—	—		Guru's Jazzmatazz, Vol. 3: Streetsoul
"Candy" (Foxy Brown featuring Kelis)	2001	—	48	—	—	—	—	—	—	—	—		Broken Silence
"What It Is" (Busta Rhymes featuring Kelis)	2001	—	—	—	—	—	—	—	—	—	—		Violator: The Album, V2.0 / Genesis
"When the Last Time" (Clipse featuring Kelis and Pharrell)	2002	19	8	—	—	—	—	—	—	—	41		Lord Willin'
"Help Me" (Timo Maas featuring Kelis)	2002	—	—	—	—	94	—	—	—	—	65		Loud
"Take You Home" (Angie Martinez featuring Kelis)	2002	85	62	—	—	—	—	—	—	—	—		Animal House
"How You Want That" (Loon featuring Kelis)	2003	88	— (Note: "How You Want That" did not enter the Hot R&B/Hip-Hop Songs chart, but peaked at number one on the Bubbling Under R&B/Hip-Hop Singles chart.)	—	—	—	—	—	—	—	—		Loon
"Finest Dreams" (Richard X featuring Kelis)	2003	—	—	—	—	—	35	—	—	—	8		Richard X Presents His X-Factor Vol. 1
"Not in Love" (Enrique Iglesias featuring Kelis)	2004	— (Note: "Not in Love" did not enter the Billboard Hot 100, but peaked at number 18 on the Bubbling Under Hot 100 Singles chart.)	—	15	36	14	7	36	11	14	5	ARIA: Gold	7
"I Love My Chick" (Busta Rhymes featuring will.i.am and Kelis)	2006	41	18	22	—	38	18	8	—	22	8		The Big Bang
"Not a Criminal" (Chamillionaire featuring Kelis)	2007	— (Note: "Not a Criminal" did not enter the Billboard Hot 100, but peaked at number three on the Bubbling Under Hot 100 Singles chart.)	— (Note: "Not a Criminal" did not enter the Hot R&B/Hip-Hop Songs chart, but peaked at number five on the Bubbling Under R&B/Hip-Hop Singles chart.)	—	—	—	—	—	—	—	—		Non-album single
"No Security" (Crookers featuring Kelis)	2009	—	—	—	—	—	—	—	—	—	—		Tons of Friends
"Spaceship" (Benny Benassi featuring Kelis, apl.de.ap and Jean-Baptiste)	2010	—	—	—	16	—	—	—	—	—	94		Electroman
"Bounce" (Calvin Harris featuring Kelis)	2011	—	—	7	—	—	6	6	—	—	2	ARIA: 3× Platinum; BPI: Platinum; RMNZ: Gold	18 Months
"Tomorrow Changed Today" (Dimitri Vegas & Like Mike and The WAV.s featuring Kelis)	2012	—	—	—	—	—	—	—	—	—	—		Non-album singles
"Give It All" (Don Diablo featuring Alex Clare and Kelis)	2013	—	—	—	—	—	—	—	—	—	—		Non-album singles
"Hearts" (Dan Black featuring Kelis)	2013	—	—	—	—	—	—	—	—	—	—		Do Not Revenge
"The Key" (Breach featuring Kelis)	2014	—	—	—	—	—	—	—	—	—	—		Non-album singles
"Do It Like Me (Icy Feet)" (TCTS featuring Sage the Gemini and Kelis)	2017	—	—	—	—	—	—	—	—	—	—		Non-album singles
"Deal with It" (Ashnikko featuring Kelis)	2021	—	—	—	—	—	—	— (Note: "Deal with It" did not enter the NZ Top 40 Singles Chart, but peaked at number 17 on the NZ Hot Singles Chart.)	—	—	84		Demidevil
"—" denotes a recording that did not chart or was not released in that territory.

== Other charted songs ==
List of other charted songs, with selected chart positions, showing year released and album name
Title	Year	Peaks	Album
Title	Year	AUS	Album
"I Don't Think So"	2008	27	Kelis Was Here

== Guest appearances ==
List of non-single guest appearances, with other performing artists, showing year released and album name
Title	Year	Other artist(s)	Album
"Fairytalez"	1997	Gravediggaz	The Pick, the Sickle and the Shovel
"Watcha Wanna Do? (Bang Your Head Remix)"	1999	Pras, Clipse	Non-album single
"Cocaine Business (Hysteria)"	1999	Noreaga	Melvin Flynt – Da Hustler
"Jamaica Way"	2000	Beenie Man	Art and Life
"How Many Licks? (Remix)"	2000	Lil' Kim, Snoop Dogg, Lil Cease	Non-album single
"This Must Be Love"	2001	Dane Bowers	Urban Renewal
"I Don't Care Anymore"	2001	None	Urban Renewal
"I'm Leavin'"	2001	Outsidaz, Rah Digga	The Bricks
"What It Is Pt. 2"	2001	Flipmode Squad	Dr. Dolittle 2 (soundtrack)
"Dandelion"	2001	LFO	Life Is Good
"I Don't Know What"	2001	Krayzie Bone	Thug on da Line
"Truth or Dare"	2002	N.E.R.D, Pusha T	In Search Of...
"Consider This"	2002	N.O.R.E.	God's Favorite
"So Be It"	2002	None	Red Hot + Riot: The Music and Spirit of Fela Kuti
"Hey Nas"	2002	Nas, Claudette Ortiz	God's Son
"Popular Thug"	2003	Nas	The Neptunes Present... Clones
"Dracula's Wedding"	2003	Outkast	Speakerboxxx/The Love Below
"Fight for Your Right"	2003	Mondo Grosso	Next Wave
"Make This Run"	2003	Royce da 5'9"	Build & Destroy: The Lost Sessions Part 1
"Oceania" (Remix)	2004	Björk	"Who Is It" (single)
"American Way"	2004	Nas	Street's Disciple
"4 Ur Ears"	2005	Timo Maas	Pictures
"Brass in Pocket"	2005	None	Just Like Heaven (Soundtrack)
"Not Going Back"	2006	Nas	Hip Hop Is Dead
"Raindrops Keep Fallin' on My Head"	2007	Dionne Warwick	My Friends & Me
"Scars"	2009	Basement Jaxx, Meleka, Chipmunk	Scars
"The Man Who Stole a Leopard"	2010	Duran Duran	All You Need Is Now
"Copy Cat"	2012	Skream	Skreamizm, Vol. 7
"Back and Forth"	2015	Giorgio Moroder	Déjà Vu
"Watch Your Step"	2020	Disclosure	Energy
"Talkin"	2022	Kojey Radical, Tiana Major9	Reason to Smile

== Music videos ==
List of music videos as lead artist, showing year released and directors
Title	Year	Director(s)	Ref.
"Caught Out There"	1999	Hype Williams	
"Good Stuff"	2000	David LaChapelle	
"Get Along with You"	2000	Paul Hunter	
"Young, Fresh n' New"	2001	Diane Martel	
"Milkshake"	2003	Jake Nava	
"Trick Me"	2004	Mr. X	
"Millionaire" (featuring André 3000)	2004	Giuseppe Capotondi	
"Bossy" (featuring Too Short)	2006	Marc Klasfeld	
"Blindfold Me" (featuring Nas)	2006	Marc Klasfeld	
"Lil Star" (featuring Cee-Lo)	2007	Marc Klasfeld	
"Acapella"	2010	Rankin, Chris Cottam and Nicole Ehrlich	
"4th of July (Fireworks)"	2010	Kelis, Rankin and Nicole Ehrlich	
"Scream"	2010	Rankin	
"Brave"	2011	Rankin	
"Jerk Ribs"	2014	Laurent Levy	
"Rumble"	2014	Christian Lamb	
"Midnight Snacks"	2021	Adrienne Raquel	

List of music videos as featured artist, showing year released and directors
Title	Year	Director(s)	Ref.
"Got Your Money" (Ol' Dirty Bastard featuring Kelis)	1999	Nzingha Stewart, Scott Kalvert, Hype Williams and D'Urville Martin	
"Supa Love" (Guru featuring Kelis)	2000	Andrew Dosunmu	
"What It Is" (Busta Rhymes featuring Kelis)	2001	Hype Williams	
"Help Me" (Timo Maas featuring Kelis)	2002	Rojo	
"When the Last Time" (Clipse featuring Kelis and Pharrell)	2002	Diane Martel	
"Take You Home" (Angie Martinez featuring Kelis)	2002	Chris Robinson	
"Finest Dreams" (Richard X featuring Kelis)	2003	Oli Goldsmith	
"How You Want That" (Loon featuring Kelis)	2003	Little X	
"Not in Love" (Enrique Iglesias featuring Kelis)	2004	Jake Nava	
"I Love My Chick" (Busta Rhymes featuring will.i.am and Kelis)	2006	Benny Boom	
"Spaceship" (Benny Benassi featuring Kelis, apl.de.ap and Jean-Baptiste)	2010	Ray Kay	
"Bounce" (Calvin Harris featuring Kelis)	2011	Vincent Haycock and AG Rojas	
"Hearts" (Dan Black featuring Kelis)	2013	Chic & Artistic	
"The Key" (Breach featuring Kelis)	2014	Oliver Hadlee Pearch	
"Watch Your Step" (Disclosure featuring Kelis)	2020	Kid. Studio, Glenn Michael and Christo Anesti	
