= The Hits (Kelis album) =

Greatest hits album by Kelis
- Released: March 1, 2008
- Recorded: 1998–2007
- Length: 58:07
- Label: Jive; Legacy
- Producer: André 3000; Dallas Austin; Shondrae "Bangladesh" Crawford; Cee-Lo Green; The Neptunes; Richard X; Rockwilder

Kelis chronology
Kelis Was Here (2006)	The Hits (2008)	Flesh Tone (2010)

Professional ratings
Review scores
Source	Rating
AllMusic	3.5/5 stars
Pitchfork	6.0/10
PopMatters	6/10
Q	3/5 stars
Slant Magazine	4/5 stars

The Hits is the first greatest hits album by American singer Kelis. It was released on March 1, 2008, by Jive Records and Legacy Recordings. It is Kelis's final release with both Jive and Virgin Records, before signing a recording contract with Interscope Records. The album contains no previously unreleased material.

== Track listing ==
No.	Title	Writer(s)	Producer(s)	Length
1.	"Caught Out There" (from Kaleidoscope, 1999)	Pharrell Williams; Chad Hugo	The Neptunes	4:11
2.	"Milkshake" (from Tasty, 2003)	Williams; Hugo	The Neptunes	3:04
3.	"Got Your Money" (Ol' Dirty Bastard featuring Kelis; from Nigga Please, 1999)	Williams; Hugo; Russell Jones	The Neptunes	4:01
4.	"Trick Me" (from Tasty)	Dallas Austin	Austin	3:28
5.	"Lil Star" (featuring Cee-Lo; from Kelis Was Here, 2006)	Kelis Rogers-Jones; Thomas Callaway	Cee-Lo Green	4:51
6.	"Get Along with You" (from Kaleidoscope)	Williams; Hugo	The Neptunes	4:29
7.	"Young, Fresh n' New" (from Wanderland, 2001)	Williams; Hugo; Rogers-Jones	The Neptunes	4:38
8.	"Truth or Dare" (N.E.R.D featuring Kelis and Pusha T; from In Search of..., 2003)	Williams; Hugo; Terrence Thornton	The Neptunes	3:38
9.	"Bossy" (featuring Too Short; from Kelis Was Here)	Rogers-Jones; Shondrae Crawford; Todd Shaw; Sean Garrett	Shondrae "Bangladesh" Crawford	4:34
10.	"In Public" (featuring Nas; from Tasty)	Dana Stinson; Rogers	Rockwilder	4:27
11.	"Millionaire" (featuring André 3000; from Tasty)	André Benjamin; Rogers-Jones; Douglas Davis; Ricky Walters	André 3000	3:46
12.	"Finest Dreams" (Richard X featuring Kelis; from Richard X Presents His X-Factor Vol. 1, 2003)	Terry Lewis; James Harris III; Philip Adrian Wright; Philip Oakey	Richard X	4:13
13.	"Suspended" (from Kaleidoscope)	Williams; Hugo; Rogers-Jones	The Neptunes	4:55
14.	"Good Stuff" (featuring Terrar; from Kaleidoscope)	Williams; Hugo	The Neptunes	3:52
Total length:				58:07

iTunes Store Australia bonus track
No.	Title	Writer(s)	Producer(s)	Length
15.	"I Don't Think So" (from Kelis Was Here)	Rogers-Jones; Max Martin; Lukasz Gottwald	Martin; Dr. Luke	3:02
Total length:				61:09

Japanese edition bonus tracks
No.	Title	Writer(s)	Producer(s)	Length
15.	"Trick Me" (Mac & Toolz Extended Remix)	Austin	Austin; Mac & Toolz^{[a]}	4:31
16.	"Caught Out There" (The Neptunes Extended Remix)	Williams; Hugo	The Neptunes	6:22
17.	"Milkshake" (DJ Zinc Remix)	Williams; Hugo	The Neptunes; DJ Zinc^{[a]}	5:59
Total length:				74:52

Notes

- ^{^a} signifies a remixer

Sample credits

- "Millionaire" contains excerpts from "La Di Da Di" by Doug E. Fresh and Slick Rick.
- "Finest Dreams" contains elements from "The Finest" by The S.O.S. Band and "The Things That Dreams Are Made Of" by The Human League.

== Charts ==
Chart (2008)	Peak position
UK Albums (OCC)	71
UK R&B Albums (OCC)	17
US Top R&B/Hip-Hop Albums (Billboard)	78

== Certifications ==
Certifications and sales for The Hits
Region	Certification	Certified units/sales
United Kingdom (BPI)	Gold	100,000^{‡}
^{‡} Sales+streaming figures based on certification alone.

== Release history ==
Region	Date	Label	Ref.
Australia	March 1, 2008	EMI	
United Kingdom	March 3, 2008	Virgin	
United States	March 11, 2008	Jive; Legacy	
Germany	March 14, 2008	EMI	
Canada	March 18, 2008	Sony	
Japan	April 9, 2008	EMI	
