= List of awards and nominations received by Kelis =

Kelis awards and nominations
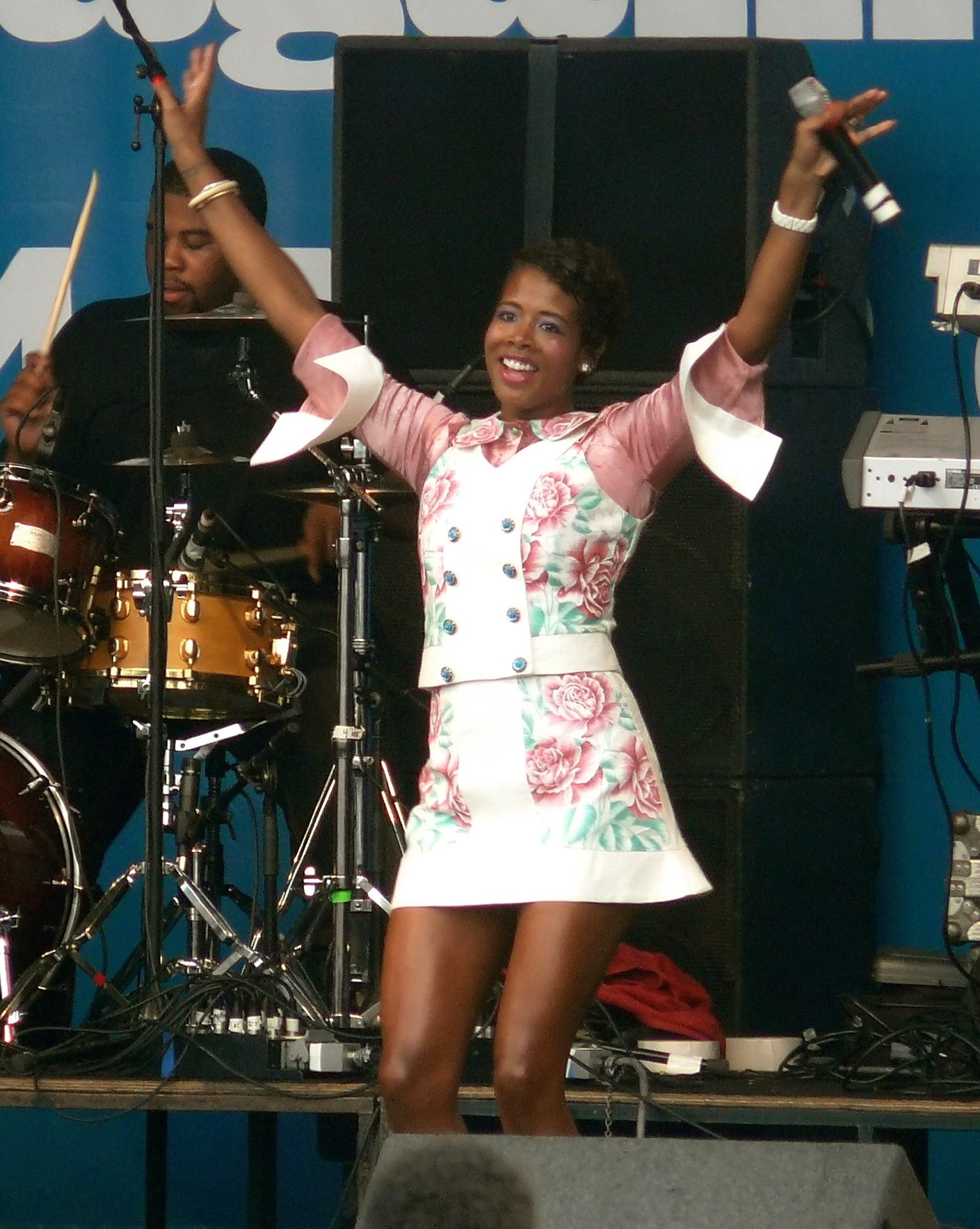
- Kelis performing at the Rise Festival in Finsbury Park, Harringey, England
Awards and nominations
Award	Wins	Nominations
Billboard	0	2
Brit	1	1
Grammy	0	2
MTV Europe	0	1
MVPA	0	2
NME	1	0
Q	1	1
Soul Train	0	1
Teen Choice	0	2

Totals (Note: Certain award groups do not simply award one winner. They acknowledge several different recipients, have runners-up, and have third place. Since this is a specific recognition and is different from losing an award, runner-up mentions are considered wins in this award tally. For simplification and to avoid errors, each award in this list has been presumed to have had a prior nomination.)
- Wins: 9
- Nominations: 33

Kelis is an American music artist and chef. Before her debut, Kelis collaborated with other artists on their albums, including "Fairytalez" with Gravediggaz and "Got Your Money" with Ol' Dirty Bastard. Kelis has released six studio albums, two with Virgin Records: Kaleidoscope (1999), Wanderland (2001), Tasty (2003), Kelis Was Here (2006), Flesh Tone (2010) and Food (2014). After the success of her first album, Kelis commented, "Kaleidoscope was an experiment. I got into the studio, 18 years old. I was angry, I was anxious and waaaaaahhhhh! Whatever came out, came out." A few of her songs have appeared on the Billboard Hot 100 charts, including "Milkshake" which peaked at number three and "Bossy" at number sixteen.

Kelis's only Grammy Award nominations are the two awards for Best Urban/Alternative Performance for the song "Milkshake" in 2004 and Best Contemporary R&B Album for her fourth album "Kelis Was Here" in 2007, but she didn't win either of them. She was nominated for two Billboard Music Awards in 2000, including Best New Artist Video for "Caught Out There". At the New York Music Awards, Kelis won all three nominations that she received, including Best R&B Video and Best Dance Single for "Acapella", and Best R&B Album for "Flesh Tone". Also, she was named the Best Solo Artist at the Glamour Awards in 2004. Overall, Kelis has received 9 awards from 33 nominations.

== Antville Music Video Awards ==
The Antville Music Video Awards are online awards for the best music video and music video directors of the year. They were first awarded in 2005.

Year	Nominee / work	Award	Result
2011	"Bounce" (with Calvin Harris)	Best Editing	Nominated

== Billboard Music Awards ==
The Billboard Music Awards are held to honor artists for commercial performance in the U.S., based on record charts published by Billboard.

Year	Nominee / work	Award	Result
2004	Herself	Top R&B/Hip-Hop Artist - Female	Nominated
2004	"Not in Love" (with Enrique Iglesias)	Top Hot Dance Club Play Single	Nominated

== Billboard Music Video Awards ==
The Billboard Music Video Awards are sponsored by Billboard magazine to honor artists and their music videos. Kelis has been nominated two times.

Year	Nominee / work	Award	Result
2000	"Caught Out There"	Best New Artist Video (Pop)	Nominated
2000	"Caught Out There"	Best New Artist Video (R&B)	Nominated

== Brit Awards ==
The Brit Awards are the British Phonographic Industry's annual pop music awards. Kelis has won one award from one nomination.

Year	Nominee / work	Award	Result
2001	Kelis	International Breakthrough Act	Won
2005	Kelis	International Female Solo Artist	Nominated

== DanceStar USA Awards ==
Year	Nominee / work	Award	Result	Ref.
2004	Herself	Best Chart Act	Nominated	
2004	"Milkshake"	Best Single	Nominated	

== Glamour Awards ==
The Glamour Awards are presented annually by the Glamour magazine to women in a variety of fields. Kelis has won one award.

Year	Nominee / work	Award	Result
2004	Kelis	Best Solo Artist	Won

== Grammy Awards ==
The Grammy Awards are awarded annually by the National Academy of Recording Arts and Sciences of the United States. Kelis has been nominated for two awards.

Year	Nominee / work	Award	Result
2004	"Milkshake"	Best Urban/Alternative Performance	Nominated
2007	Kelis Was Here	Best Contemporary R&B Album	Nominated

== International Dance Music Awards ==
The International Dance Music Awards was established in 1985. It is a part of the Winter Music Conference, a weeklong electronic music event held annually.

Year	Nominee / work	Award	Result
2004	"Milkshake"	Best R&B/Urban Dance Track	Nominated
2004	"Milkshake"	Bear Rap/Hip-Hop Dance Track	Nominated

== MOBO Awards ==
The Music of Black Origin Awards (MOBO), first presented in 1996, are held annually in the United Kingdom to recognise artists of any race or nationality who perform black music and "recognise the outstanding achievements of artists who perform music in genres ranging from Gospel, Jazz, RnB, Soul, Reggae to Hip Hop".

Year	Nominee / work	Award	Result
2004	"Milkshake"	Best Video	Nominated

== MP3 Music Awards ==
The MP3 Music Awards (MMA) is an annual music awards show in the United Kingdom, and chosen by worldwide public votes.

Year	Nominee / work	Award	Result
2010	"Acapella"	The HDT Award	Won

== MTV Europe Music Awards ==
The MTV Europe Music Awards ("EMAs", originally MTV European Music Awards) were established in 1994 by MTV Networks Europe to celebrate the most popular songs and singers in Europe.

Year	Nominee / work	Award	Result
2004	Kelis	Best R&B	Nominated

== Music Television Awards ==
Year	Nominee / work	Award	Result
2004	Kelis	Best R&B	Nominated
2004	Kelis	Best Dance	Nominated
2004	"Milkshake"	Best Video	Nominated

== MVPA Awards ==
Year	Nominee / work	Award	Result
2007	"Bossy"	Best Director of a Female Artist	Nominated
2007	"Bossy"	Best Hair	Nominated

== New York Music Awards ==
The New York Music Awards is an annual awards ceremony and live concert.

Year	Nominee / work	Award	Result
2011	"Acapella"	Best R&B Video	Won
2011	"Acapella"	Best Dance Single	Won
2011	Flesh Tone	Best R&B Album	Won

== NME Awards ==
The NME Awards is an annual music awards show in the United Kingdom, founded by the music magazine, NME (New Musical Express). Kelis has won one award from one nomination.

Year	Nominee / work	Award	Result
2001	Kelis	Best R&B/Soul Act	Won

== Q Awards ==
Year	Nominee / work	Award	Result
2000	"Caught Out There"	Best Video	Won
2004	"Milkshake"	Best Video	Nominated

== Silver Clef Awards ==
Year	Nominee / work	Award	Result
2010	Kelis	International Award	Won

== Soul Train Music Awards ==
Year	Nominee / work	Award	Result	Ref.
2007	"I Love My Chick" (with Busta Rhymes & will.i.am)	Best R&B/Soul or Rap Music Video	Nominated	
2014	Kelis	Centric Award	Nominated	

== Smash Hits Poll Winners Party ==
The Smash Hits Poll Winners Party was an awards ceremony which ran from 1988 to 2005. Each award winner was voted by readers of the Smash Hits magazine.

Year	Nominee / work	Award	Result
2000	Kelis	Best New Female Solo Star	Nominated

== Teen Choice Awards ==
The Teen Choice Awards is an awards show presented annually by the Fox Broadcasting Company. Kelis was nominated two times.

Year	Nominee / work	Award	Result
2004	"Milkshake"	Choice Single	Nominated
2006	Kelis	Choice Grill	Nominated

== TMH Awards ==
Year	Nominee / work	Award	Result
2004	"Milkshake"	Favorite Up Tempo Single of the Year	Nominated

== UK Music Video Awards ==
Year	Nominee / work	Award	Result
2011	"Bounce" (w/Calvin Harris)	Best Dance Video	Nominated

== Urban Music Awards ==
Year	Nominee / work	Award	Result
2007	"Bossy"	Best Music Video	Nominated
2007	Kelis	Best R&B Act	Nominated

== Vibe Awards ==
Year	Nominee / work	Award	Result
2004	"Milkshake"	Club Banger	Nominated
