= Osirus =

Osirus may refer to:

- Osirus (album) (2005), final album from Ol' Dirty Bastard before his death in 2004
- Ol' Dirty Bastard, as a nickname for the American rapper

== See also ==
- Osiris, the Egyptian god, as a misspelling
