= The Trials and Tribulations of Russell Jones =

Compilation album by Ol' Dirty Bastard
- Released: March 19, 2002
- Recorded: 1994–2002
- Genre: East Coast hip-hop
- Length: 49:16
- Label: D3
- Producers: One Eye; Tytanic; TrackStars; Brooklyn ZU

Ol' Dirty Bastard chronology
Nigga Please (1999)	The Trials and Tribulations of Russell Jones (2002)	Osirus (2005)

Professional ratings
Review scores
Source	Rating
AllMusic	2/5 stars
Robert Christgau	(choice cut)
Entertainment Weekly	C−
Los Angeles Times	2/4 stars
RapReviews	(3.5/10)
Rolling Stone	2.5/5 stars

The Trials and Tribulations of Russell Jones is a compilation album by Ol' Dirty Bastard, released in 2002. It was called "a haphazard, slapdash affair that seems cobbled together mainly to exploit ODB’s notoriety for a fast buck. The mush-mouthed Jones barely appears on some tracks, and when he does, his crude, unfunny rhymes are even more incomprehensible than usual. To compensate, the producers drafted a legion of guest stars including Mack 10, Too Short and Insane Clown Posse, and padded the CD out with tapes of ODB’s pointless ramblings."

== Track listing ==
1. "Intro"
2. "Caught Up" - (featuring Mack 10, Royal Flush)
3. "Dirty & Stinkin'" - (featuring Insane Clown Posse)
4. "Dogged Out" - (featuring Big Syke, Too Short)
5. "Free with Money"
6. "Anybody" - (featuring E-40, C-Murder)
7. "Waitress #13"
8. "Reunited"
9. "Here Comes the Judge" - (featuring Buddha Monk)
10. "Cute Devils"
11. "I Wanna Fuck" - (featuring Royal Flush)
12. "Highjack"
13. "Lintballz" - (featuring 12 O'Clock, Prodigal Sunn, Hell Razah, Popa Chief & Buddha Monk)
14. "Zoo Two"
15. "Anybody (remix)" - (featuring E-40, C-Murder)
16. "Taking a Shit"
17. "C'mon"
18. "Dirty & Stinkin'" (Remix) - (featuring Insane Clown Posse)

== Re-made songs ==
Many of these songs contain lyrics that were used on other albums from ODB, including his debut LP Return to the 36 Chambers: The Dirty Version, and his second full-length release Nigga Please. Other lyrics on this album were used on releases by ODB's group Wu-Tang Clan.

- "Dirty and Stinkin'" contains lyrics from "Recognize" on Nigga Please and "Last Call" (a single released on the Bully movie soundtrack)'
- "Dogged Out" contains lyrics from "Dog Shit" on Wu-Tang Clan's Wu-Tang Forever
- "Zoo Two" contains lyrics from "Damage (feat. GZA)" and "Brooklyn Zoo II (Tiger Crane) [feat. Ghostface Killah]" on Return to the 36 Chambers: The Dirty Version
- "C'mon" is a remake of "Baby C'mon" on Return to the 36 Chambers: The Dirty Version

== Year-end charts ==
Chart (2002)	Position
Canadian R&B Albums (Nielsen SoundScan)	192
Canadian Rap Albums (Nielsen SoundScan)	95
