= Kelis =

American singer (born 1979)

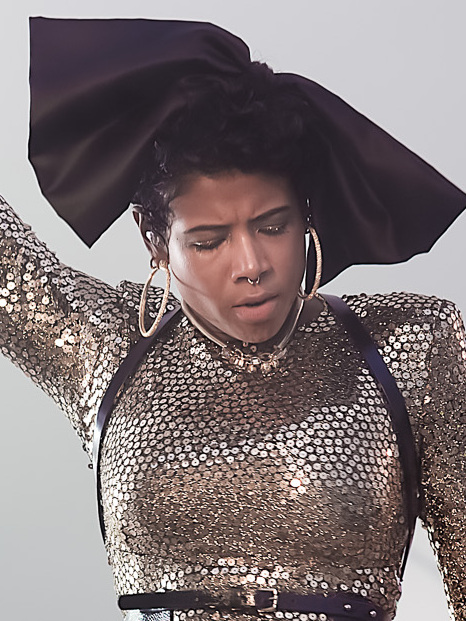
- Kelis in 2011
- Born: Kelis Rogers; August 21, 1979 (age 47); New York City, U.S.
- Education: Le Cordon Bleu (BA)
- Occupations: Singer; songwriter; chef; restaurateur
- Years active: 1997–present
- Works: Discography; filmography
- Spouses: Nas (m. 2005; div. 2010); Mike Mora (m. 2014; died 2022)
- Children: 3
- Awards: Full list
- Musical career
- Genres: R&B; hip hop; soul; dance
- Labels: Ninja Tune; Virgin; Star Trak; Arista; Interscope; Jive; Geffen; will.i.am; BMG
- Website: kelisofficial.com

Kelis Rogers (/kəˈliːs/; born August 21, 1979) is an American singer. She attended Manhattan's Fiorello H. LaGuardia High School of Music & Art and Performing Arts, where she played saxophone and was selected for the Girls Choir of Harlem. Upon graduation, Rogers landed a role as a backing vocalist for the hip hop group Gravediggaz. She then began working with music producers Pharrell Williams and Chad Hugo—collectively known as the Neptunes—who led her to sign with Virgin Records in 1998. The following year, she appeared on Ol' Dirty Bastard's Neptunes-produced single "Got Your Money", which became her first entry on the Billboard Hot 100.

Rogers's debut studio album, Kaleidoscope (1999), inspired by jazz and disco music from the 1970s, sold poorly in the United States but drew critical acclaim and found moderate success on international charts. Led by her first Billboard Hot 100 entry as a lead artist, "Caught Out There", the album peaked at number 43 on the UK Albums Chart and earned gold certification by the country's British Phonographic Industry (BPI). She parted ways with Virgin Records after the poor sales of her second album, Wanderland (2001), and signed with the Neptunes' Star Trak Entertainment. Her third studio album, Tasty (2003), drew more critical praise and became her commercial breakthrough. Its lead single, "Milkshake", peaked at number three on the Billboard Hot 100 and number two on the UK singles chart; its follow-up, "Trick Me", also reached No. 2 in the UK. Her fourth album, Kelis Was Here (2006), was supported by the US top-20 single "Bossy" (featuring Too Short), and peaked at number ten on the Billboard 200. After its release, she took a hiatus from recording and ventured into culinary arts at Le Cordon Bleu.

She signed with will.i.am Music Group to release her fifth album, Flesh Tone (2010), which explored electronic music. Two of its singles, "Acapella" and "4th of July (Fireworks)" found success on the US Hot Dance Club Songs chart and the UK Dance Singles Chart. Tying in with her culinary career, she released her sixth studio album Food (2014), which became her second top-20 album in the UK and spawned three singles: "Jerk Ribs", "Rumble" and "Friday Fish Fry". The album explored a neo soul recording style.

Rogers has been recognized at the Brit Awards, Q Awards, NME Awards, and Grammy Awards. Her musical output as a lead and featured artist encompasses various genres. She has collaborated with R&B and hip hop acts including Nas (whom she married in 2003), Busta Rhymes, Outkast, and Puff Daddy; electronic and dance producers such as Calvin Harris, Disclosure, Giorgio Moroder, Timo Maas, and Richard X; pop and rock acts Enrique Iglesias, Duran Duran, and No Doubt; and indie and alternative musicians including Björk and Dave Sitek. She has sold six million records worldwide and has had particular success in the United Kingdom, where ten of her singles have peaked within the top ten of the UK Singles Chart.

== Early life ==
Rogers was born and raised in the Frederick Douglass Houses in the Manhattan Valley neighborhood of Manhattan, New York City. Her first name is a portmanteau of her father's name, Kenneth (1944–2000), and her mother's name, Eveliss. Her father Kenneth was an African-American jazz musician and Pentecostal minister, as well as a former professor at Wesleyan University. Her mother Eveliss is a Chinese-Puerto Rican fashion designer who inspired her to pursue her singing career. She has three sisters, two older and one younger.

As a child, Rogers sang in church choirs and played violin, piano, and saxophone while attending Manhattan Country School, a private school. At 13, she shaved off all of her hair. In an interview, Rogers says she was kicked out of her parents' house at age 16 for bad behavior, and that although she would sometimes clash with her mother, she nevertheless continued her education at the Fiorello H. LaGuardia High School of Music & Art and Performing Arts, where she formed the R&B trio BLU (Black Ladies United). She has worked as a bartender, and had a job as a sales associate at a clothing store before graduating high school.

== Career ==
=== 1997–2002: Kaleidoscope and Wanderland ===
In 1997, Kelis provided background vocals on "Fairytalez", a track on hip hop group Gravediggaz's album The Pick, the Sickle and the Shovel. Afterward, a friend introduced Kelis to The Neptunes (Pharrell Williams and Chad Hugo); they formed a strong bond, and with their support she landed a record deal with Virgin Records. According to Kelis, Virgin Records advised her that publishing royalties would be split evenly among Williams, Hugo, and herself; however, Kelis made no money from sales of her first two albums on the label. Kelis has said that Williams was credited as a songwriter on songs of hers that he had not written.

Kelis began recording her debut album Kaleidoscope in mid-1998 and was finished within a year. Produced by The Neptunes and released by Virgin Records in 1999, Kaleidoscope peaked at number 144 on the U.S. Billboard 200 chart and reached the top five on the Top Heatseekers chart. As of 2006, the album has sold 249,000 copies, according to Nielsen SoundScan. Its lead and most notable single "Caught Out There" became a top 10 Hot R&B/Hip-Hop Songs hit and peaked at number 54 on the Billboard Hot 100. During this time, Kelis featured on Ol' Dirty Bastard's U.S. top 40 single "Got Your Money".

The album performed better in Europe, where "Caught Out There" was a moderate hit in most European countries except the United Kingdom, where the song saw massive success, peaking at number four on the UK Singles Chart. The single "Good Stuff" (featuring Pusha T of Clipse) reached number 19; another single "Get Along with You" was less successful, reaching number 51. The British Phonographic Industry certified Kaleidoscope gold for sales of 100,000 copies in the United Kingdom, where it reached number 43 on the UK Albums Chart.

In 2001, Kelis won the Brit Award for International Breakthrough Act and the NME Award for Best R&B/Soul Act, then joined Moby and U2 on the Area:One and Elevation tours, respectively. Kelis and the Neptunes' output at this time was heralded as foreshadowing an innovation in contemporary R&B, but she later said "I was never an R&B artist. People coined me one but that's because, especially if you're in the States, if you're black and you sing, then you're R&B". Her colorful style in both clothing and hair received considerable attention.

Kelis's second album Wanderland was released in 2001 in Europe, Asia, and Latin America but did not receive a North American release until 2019. According to Kelis, Virgin Records, her U.S. record company at the time, had laid off those that worked on Kaleidoscope; their replacements did not understand or believe in Wanderland. Eventually, Kelis was dropped from Virgin around the time of the album's European release, but she remained on the label's roster in Europe. A commercial failure, Wanderland peaked at number 78 in the UK; its only single "Young, Fresh n' New" managed to crack the top 40 on the UK Singles Chart. The album, which was produced in its entirety by the Neptunes and features collaborations with members of Clipse and No Doubt, received a subdued critical response. NME wrote: "In our collective fantasies, Kelis Rogers is already the ghetto-fabulous sex-queen of discodelic future-funk pop-rock-soul ... But beyond the initial shopping-and-funking dazzle, there is way too much filler here for a hotly hyped alterna-soul princess with her eyes on the big prize". The Fader later referred to Wanderland as "Kelis's long lost masterpiece".

In 2002, Kelis recorded "So Be It" for the Red Hot Organization's Fela Kuti tribute CD Red Hot and Riot, from which all proceeds were donated to AIDS-awareness charities. The same year, she had a top 20 U.S. club hit with a remix of "Young, Fresh 'n' New", produced by Timo Maas, who featured Kelis on his single "Help Me". She hosted the DanceStar USA Awards ceremony at that year's Winter Music Conference.

=== 2003–2005: Tasty ===
In 2003, Kelis achieved a second top 10 hit in the UK as a featured artist on Richard X's "Finest Dreams", a reworking of the S.O.S. Band's 1986 single "The Finest", and a European club hit (and UK top 40 single) as a featured artist on "Let's Get Ill" by P. Diddy, her manager for a brief period. She found mainstream success in the U.S. later in 2003 with her Hot Dance Club Play number one, Billboard Hot 100 top three single "Milkshake"; this single helped to propel her third album Tasty to gold status in the U.S., where it peaked at number 27 on the Billboard 200 and has sold 533,000 copies, according to Nielsen SoundScan. "Milkshake" also went gold, selling over 500,000 copies, and earned Kelis a Grammy Award nomination in 2004 for Best Urban/Alternative Performance.

Although the Neptunes contributed several tracks to Tasty—the album was released by their label Star Trak Entertainment, a joint venture with Arista Records—Kelis also collaborated with other producers such as Dallas Austin, André 3000, Rockwilder, and Raphael Saadiq. She stated in an interview: "I felt like I had a lot to prove with this album. People had started messing with me along the lines of 'Is she REALLY any good without The Neptunes?' — which I knew was ridiculous. And so I was like 'I'll take that challenge'." The album was well-received critically; Entertainment Weekly wrote that Tasty is "Kelis' past—big beats, out-there imagery, and sex appeal—refined ... much of the beauty of Tasty is in witnessing Kelis rise to the challenge of working with multiple imaginative maestros."

"Milkshake" and Tasty immediately found success in Europe. According to the BPI, Tasty went platinum in the United Kingdom, selling over 300,000 copies, and "Milkshake" went silver, selling over 200,000 units. The Dallas Austin-produced "Trick Me", the album's second single, went to the top 10 in many European countries during mid-2004; it did not, however, garner success in the U.S. in the absence of promotion by Jive Records, the label Kelis had been transferred to after Arista Records folded at the time of Tasty's release. Kelis's success grew in Australia, where Tasty went gold and where "Milkshake" and "Trick Me" went platinum. Kelis followed the success of the third Tasty single, the BPI silver-certified "Millionaire" (featuring André 3000), with the Rockwilder-produced track "In Public" (featuring Nas), which reached number 17 on the UK chart.

"Not in Love", Kelis's collaboration with Enrique Iglesias from his 2003 album 7, was released as a single the following year, reaching the UK top five. Although the single failed to chart on the U.S. Billboard Hot 100, it topped the country's Hot Dance Club Play chart. Also in 2004, Kelis collaborated with Björk on a remix of the latter's track "Oceania" (from Björk's album Medúlla), which appeared as a B-side to the single "Who Is It". Kelis toured as the opening act for fellow Jive artist Britney Spears's The Onyx Hotel Tour, then headlined her own tour of Australia and New Zealand. In 2005, she was featured on the soundtrack to the film Just Like Heaven with a cover version of The Pretenders' "Brass in Pocket".

=== 2006–2008: Kelis Was Here ===
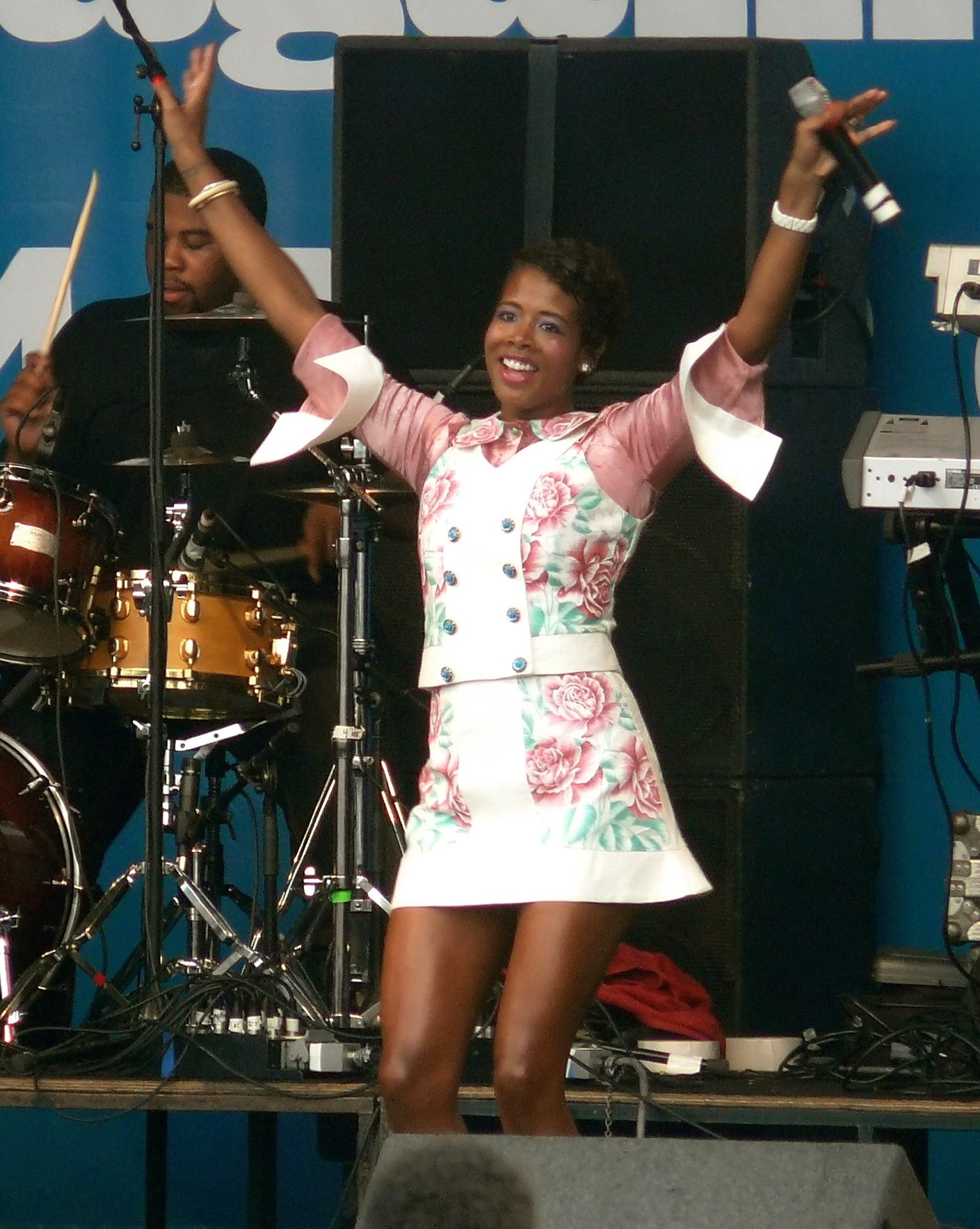
Kelis performing in 2007

Kelis contributed a track titled "80's Joint" to the soundtrack of the 2006 dance film Step Up. She collaborated with Busta Rhymes and will.i.am on the track "I Love My Bitch", the second single from Rhymes's 2006 album The Big Bang. This was the second time Kelis collaborated with Rhymes, the first being his 2001 song "What It Is".

Kelis Was Here was released in 2006, and it debuted and peaked at number 10 on the Billboard 200. Despite the career-high debut, the album has sold only 157,000 copies in the United States as of 2007, according to Nielsen SoundScan. In the UK, Kelis Was Here charted at number 41 and has sold 60,000 copies, earning a silver certification from the BPI. The album was Kelis's first not to feature contributions from The Neptunes, as she had left Star Trak by this time; instead, she recorded with Cee-Lo Green, Max Martin, Raphael Saadiq, Scott Storch, and will.i.am. According to Kelis, she received no support from Jive Records for the recording or promotion of Kelis Was Here and argued heavily with the label, later describing the period as "[not] the most creative atmosphere" and "the only time where I felt like I was being pulled in different directions. There were too many cooks in the kitchen". MTV characterised critical consensus of the album as "intriguingly intelligent, if unjustifiably disjointed and long" and wrote in 2016 that "it remains her most creatively anarchic project". Kelis Was Here was nominated for Best Contemporary R&B Album at the 2007 Grammy Awards.

"Bossy" (featuring Too Short), the lead single from Kelis Was Here, was a moderate hit in the U.S., peaking at number 16; it additionally went multi-platinum as a mobile phone ringtone, according to the RIAA. The single "Blindfold Me" (featuring Nas) reached number 91 on the R&B chart and did not chart on the Billboard Hot 100. Kelis's European label, Virgin, instead released the Cee-Lo-featuring "Lil Star", which was another top 10 hit for Kelis in the United Kingdom (peaking at number three on the UK Singles Chart). During mid 2007, Kelis toured in Europe, appearing in numerous festivals across the United Kingdom, France, and Germany, such as Wireless, Rise and Gurtenfestival. Ford chose Kelis to help advertise the 2007 Ford Edge, and she recorded a theme song for the commercial, titled "Push It to the Edge", with help from producer Scott Storch.

Jive Records dropped Kelis in late 2007. Her manager at the time said that the singer was working with Cee-Lo Green on an alternative dance album and would be shopping a pop album produced by songwriter Guy Chambers. Scottish electronica producer Calvin Harris was said to be collaborating with her. Kelis took a hiatus from music: "I was like 'I will never put out another record again, I hate this business, I hate all these people.' I was in this race that I didn't even realise that I was in. I woke up and ten years had passed. That was never my plan".

After Kelis left Jive, the label released a 14-track greatest hits album titled The Hits in 2008. The album does not contain any previously unreleased songs; Ol' Dirty Bastard's "Got Your Money", N.E.R.D's "Truth or Dare", and Richard X's "Finest Dreams" appear on the album with every charted Kelis single to that date, with the exception of "Blindfold Me". Also in 2008, the Kelis Was Here album track "I Don't Think So" became a top 40 hit in Australia after being used in promotion for the 2008 season of the reality series Big Brother Australia.

=== 2009–2011: Flesh Tone ===
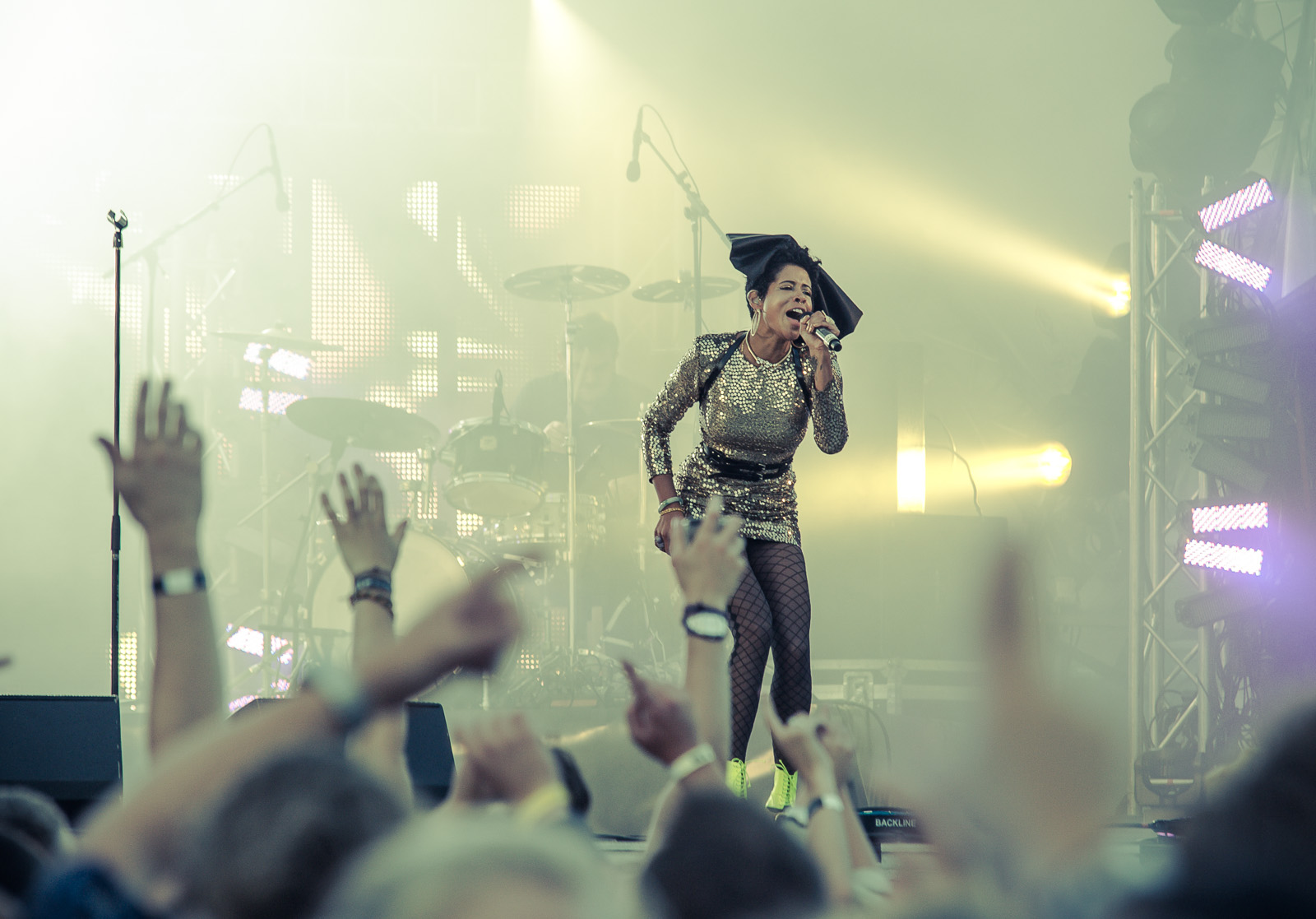
Kelis performing in 2011

In 2009, Kelis signed to Interscope Records via the will.i.am Music Group to release Flesh Tone, which included production from Ammo, Free School, Benny Benassi, Burns, Boys Noize, DJ Tocadisco, will.i.am, and David Guetta. Flesh Tone marked Kelis's transition into dance music. Kelis said she was hesitant to sign to another major label after her experiences with Jive Records but did not want the album to be "swept under the rug with a smaller label". Coinciding with her change in musical direction, Kelis appeared on Basement Jaxx's 2009 album Scars on the title track, on Benassi's 2010 single "Spaceship" (with apl.de.ap and Jean Baptiste)—a top 40 U.S. and UK club hit—and on the Crookers single "No Security" from their debut album Tons of Friends.

Critical reception to Flesh Tone was generally positive, with Pitchfork naming the album Kelis's best since her debut Kaleidoscope. "Acapella" (produced by David Guetta), the first single from Flesh Tone, debuted in the top five on the UK Singles Chart and reached number one on the U.S. Hot Dance Club Songs and the UK Dance Chart, eventually receiving a BPI silver certification. Flesh Tone peaked at number 48 on the Billboard 200 and at number five on the Dance/Electronic Albums. The single "4th of July (Fireworks)" was accompanied by a video co-directed by Kelis (with Rankin and Nicole Ehrlich) and became a top 10 club hit in America and Britain. The singles "Scream" and "Brave" made minimal chart impact.

During mid-2010, Kelis embarked on her first U.S. tour, titled All Hearts with Robyn, amid a selection of club, festival, and solo dates that continued through 2011 – these included Glastonbury, The Big Chill, Good Vibrations Festival, and Lovebox. Kelis appears on the Mark Ronson-produced track "The Man Who Stole a Leopard" from the 2010 Duran Duran album All You Need Is Now, a song she and the band performed in a concert directed by filmmaker David Lynch. She co-wrote the song "Waiting" for British pop singer Cheryl Cole's Messy Little Raindrops. Kelis then collaborated with Calvin Harris on the 2011 single "Bounce", the lead single from Harris's album 18 Months. "Bounce" debuted at number two on the UK Singles Chart, becoming Kelis's tenth UK top 10 single and her biggest selling in the country (as of 2017). It eventually received a platinum certification from the BPI.

=== 2012–2017: Food ===
In 2012, Kelis's management firm at the time announced that her sixth studio album would be released in late 2012 and feature production from Skream, Burns, Tom Neville, Dan Black, and Caspa. The first single, the Skream-produced "Distance", received its UK radio premiere in mid 2012. Kelis said of the album, "I've been on a real 1990s vibe with this record, it's kind of trip-hoppish ... it's more electro, it's a little deeper and darker". Kelis was featured on Dan Black's single "Hearts" and Skream's "Copy Cat" (both 2013), the latter of which led to a dispute after Kelis alleged that Skream refused to have her appear in the music video. She opted to move on from dance music: "when everyone else starts doing it, it's not as much fun ... too much time went by. That [sound] wasn't a new idea any more". The rest of the material from these recording sessions remains unreleased.

By 2013, Kelis was working with producer Dave Sitek, and it was announced that she would release two albums via Sitek's label Federal Prism. The single "Jerk Ribs" premiered online. Kelis then signed to British independent label Ninja Tune for the release of the album Food in 2014. Produced entirely by Sitek, Food entered the UK Albums Chart at number 20, becoming Kelis's second highest-peaking album after Tasty in 2004. In the U.S., it reached number 73 on the Billboard 200 and the top 20 on the Independent Albums. Subsequent singles were "Rumble" (a top 40 hit on the UK Independent Singles Chart) and "Friday Fish Fry". Food received positive reviews from critics, including a five-star review in The Independent: "Kelis's sixth album is a moveable feast ... If music be the food of love, Kelis has cooked up something tasty enough to satisfy all but the hungriest of hearts." Mic named Food the best album of 2014 and of Kelis's career, and Rolling Stone listed it as one of the year's best R&B albums.

A limited-edition version of Food included remixes by electronic producers such as Actress, Mount Kimbie, Ben Pearce, Breach, Machinedrum, and Will Saul. Breach reworked his remix of "Rumble" into "The Key", a track featuring Kelis, released as a single later in 2014. Kelis's performance at London's Somerset House was recorded and released as the album Live in London in late 2014. In 2015, Kelis featured on veteran disco producer Giorgio Moroder's album Déjà Vu, singing on the track "Back and Forth". In 2017, she was featured with rapper Sage The Gemini on English house DJ TCTS' single "Do It Like Me (Icy Feet)" and on Dan Black's single "Farewell". Also in 2017, she released the song "Who's Lovin' You" (originally sung by The Miracles), on the Danger Mouse-produced compilation Resistance Radio: The Man in The High Castle for the television show The Man in the High Castle.

=== 2018–present: Kaleidoscope anniversary tour and new music ===
Kelis contributed vocals to the dance track "My Milkshake", a rework of her 2003 single "Milkshake" by British producer Freejak, in 2018. Kelis embarked on the Kaleidoscope 20th Anniversary Tour, a UK and European tour celebrating the 20th-anniversary release of her debut album Kaleidoscope, in March 2020, though this was cut short due to the COVID-19 pandemic. Kelis was featured on a Disclosure song titled "Watch Your Step" in 2020 and on "Deal with It", a track on Demidevil, the debut mixtape by Ashnikko, in 2021. The former single, from Disclosure's Grammy Award-nominated album Energy, received frequent airplay on radio stations in the UK and reached the UK dance chart top 40. In October 2020, a biographical animated short about her life as a singer and chef was released on YouTube.

Kelis revealed to i-D magazine in 2019 that she was working on an EP that, at the time of the interview, was intended for release in 2020; in 2021, she said an album, Dirt, would be released in 2022. Kelis released the single "Midnight Snacks" in 2021 and "Feed Them" in 2022, the latter in collaboration with the meal delivery service Daily Harvest.

An interpolation of Kelis's "Milkshake" was used in the Beyoncé song "Energy" on her 2022 album Renaissance. The song was updated on some streaming services to remove the interpolation after Kelis said that she was not notified nor asked for approval for the song's use. Kelis said that Pharrell Williams and Chad Hugo of the Neptunes, the credited songwriters on "Milkshake", had "stolen" and "swindled" her publishing rights for the song.

In February 2023, Kelis appeared on a commercial to advertise that year's Super Bowl; the commercial also featured Diddy, Montell Jordan and Donna Lewis, among others. In March 2023, Kelis announced she would be performing on the West Holts stage at that year's Glastonbury Festival. That same month, she announced tour dates for a European-only tour. On June 3, 2023, Kelis performed at the Mighty Hoopla music festival in London. On September 12, 2023, Kelis released "Milkshake 20 (Alex Wann Remix)", which she co-produced.

== Other ventures ==
=== Culinary ===
From 2006 to 2010, Kelis trained part-time as a saucier, eventually graduating from Le Cordon Bleu. In 2013, she debuted her sauce line, Feast, at the Beverly Hills Food & Wine Festival. She has described sauce as "what accessories are to a woman's outfit. Sauce defines where the dish is from and who's making it ... I think everything is better smothered, poured, or dipped." The line went on general sale in 2015 under the new name of Bounty & Full. Kelis's first cookbook, My Life on a Plate, was also released in 2015; she describes it as "an exploration of tastes and cultures, and my experience as a chef, musician, mother and wife". She had previously written an unreleased cookbook with Lauren Pesavento in 2006.

In March 2014, Kelis set up a food truck to cook for attendees of the American music festival SXSW. She promoted her 2014 album Food by sharing her recipes for apple farro, jerk ribs, New York vanilla bean cheesecake, and more on the Spotify app Supper. That same year, the Cooking Channel aired a cooking television series starring Kelis, titled Saucy and Sweet. In 2016, Kelis and cooking duo Le Bun opened a pop-up restaurant in London that she adapted as a food truck to tour around UK music festivals. In September 2017, she released a milkshake recipe in collaboration with Baileys. In 2019, Kelis developed an exclusive menu with a local street food vendor for Jam on Rye Festival in London. She also appears in Cooked with Cannabis, a competition cooking series that Netflix launched on April 20, 2020.

=== Fashion/TV ===
In 2006, Kelis designed her own line of fashion accessories, titled Cake. In 2007, she was in talks to host a Project Runway-esque show for VH1 and auditioned for various film and TV roles.

In 2017, Kelis joined BBC One's singing contest Pitch Battle as a judge of the competition with Gareth Malone. In 2020, she competed as the Daisy in the British version of The Masked Singer, where she was eliminated in the fifth episode.

== Personal life ==
Kelis met rapper Nas at an MTV Video Music Awards party in 2002; soon after, they became engaged. They married in a civil marriage ceremony in July 2003, followed by a lavish formal wedding in January 2005. In April 2009, she filed for divorce, citing irreconcilable differences. At the time, she was several months pregnant. In July 2009, she gave birth to her first son. The couple's divorce was finalized in May 2010. Kelis has described Nas as physically and mentally abusive, crediting the anticipated birth of her child as a factor in her decision to end her marriage. Kelis also recalled that the domestic violence incident between Rihanna and Chris Brown influenced her decision. After she saw pictures of Rihanna battered, she felt embarrassed because she also had bruises all over her body, but was hesitant to speak about it. Nas replied on social media, accusing Kelis of attempting to slander him during the protracted custody battle, and of abusing their daughter. In addition to the domestic abuse claims, she alleged that Nas's drinking habit began to damage their relationship, and that he had been having affairs for two years. During the custody battle over their son, Kelis said that until 2012, she had not seen "a single cent" from Nas in child support and he had not been an active parent. She said: "He doesn't participate. He shows up when it's fun, he shows up when there's a good photo-op ... I don't think it should be 50/50 just because you had sperm involved."

In March 2007, Kelis was detained by police in Miami Beach, Florida, and charged with disorderly conduct. The arrest report said an operation in which officers posed as prostitutes in the South Beach nightclub district was disrupted when Kelis screamed racial profanities at them. She was sent to Miami-Dade County Jail and later released on a $1,500 bond. In September 2008, Kelis was acquitted. A spokesman for Kelis commented that she would file a lawsuit claiming unlawful arrest and the violation of her civil rights.

Kelis married photographer Mike Mora in 2014, and gave birth to her second son in November 2015. Beginning in January 2020, Kelis lived on and managed a remote farm outside Los Angeles. In September 2020, she gave birth to a daughter. In September 2021, Mora announced that he had stage IV stomach cancer. In an Instagram post, he stated that he had been diagnosed with advanced gastric adenocarcinoma in September 2020, and had been told he had an estimated eighteen months to live. Mike Mora died on March 14, 2022, at age 37.

In 2024, Kelis moved to Kenya, where she lives on a farm with her children.

== Artistry ==
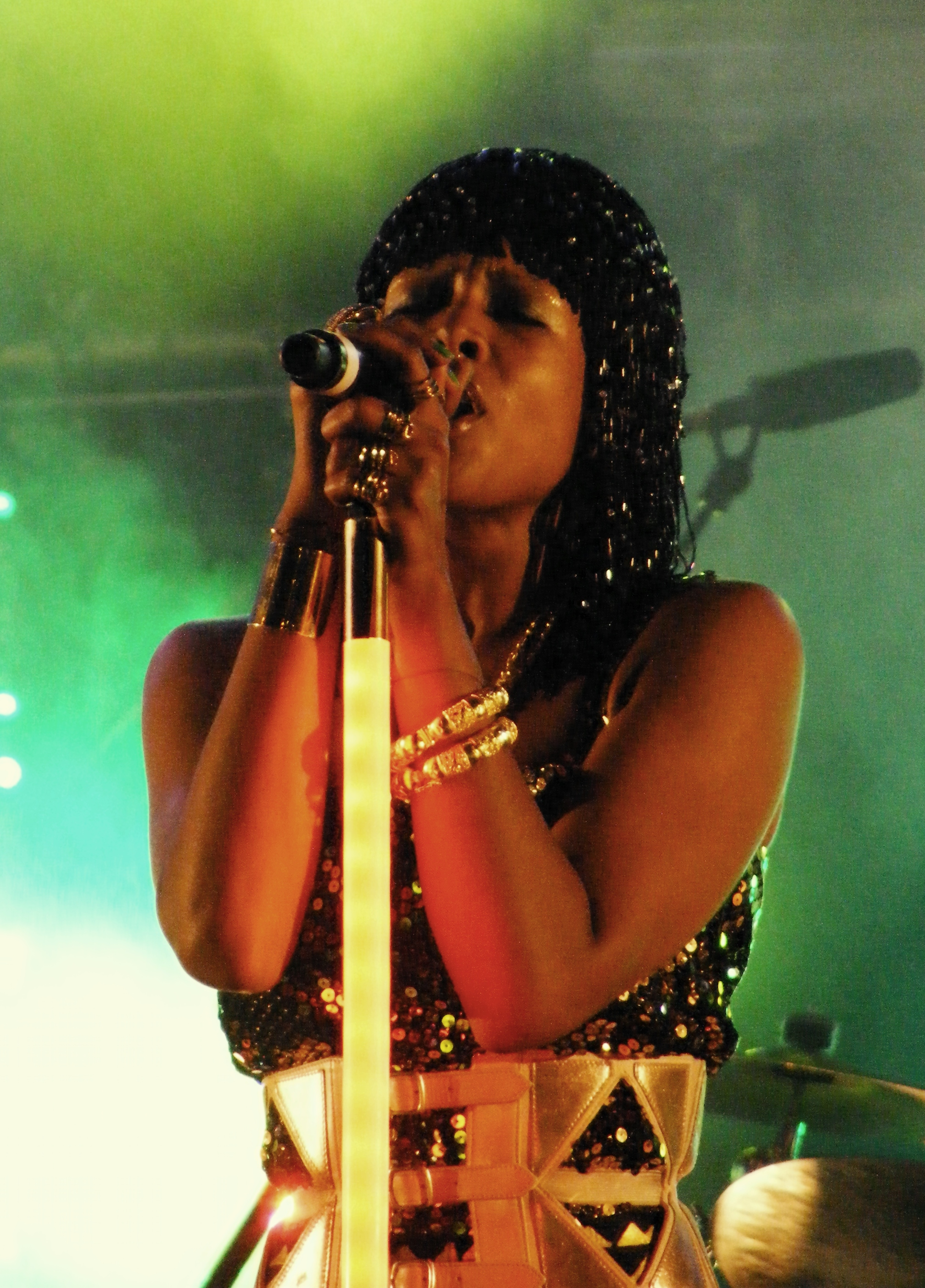
Kelis performing in 2010

AXS called Kelis a "punky, rebellious" singer-songwriter. The New York Times considered Kelis's vocals "dynamic" and commended her for being "well schooled in the intricacies of heartache". IGN described Kelis as being "strange, weird, and eccentric". The Chicago Tribune stated that Kelis made the most of "a voice that lives in the basement".

Kelis's debut album Kaleidoscope took influence from a variety of 1970s genres, which included urban, rock, jazz, hip hop, R&B, soul, and disco music. Kelis cited early Sarah Vaughan, Ella Fitzgerald and Dinah Washington as major influences for the album. Several of the album's tracks were designed for clubs, and contained electro beats meant for dancing. Her second studio album Wanderland resembles musically its predecessor while exploring more modern funk sounds, dabbling heavily into genres such as soul and rap. It carried on the same themes developed in Kaleidoscope, and was criticized for doing so.

Food (2014) contains influences of soul, funk, gospel, and Afrobeat—Kelis said of the album "You know, those records in your life that your parents played and they resonate with who you are? They make you nostalgic. I wanted to find out how to get that feeling."

== Discography ==
Studio albums

- Kaleidoscope (1999)
- Wanderland (2001)
- Tasty (2003)
- Kelis Was Here (2006)
- Flesh Tone (2010)
- Food (2014)

== Tours ==
Headlining

- Tasty Down Under Tour (2004)
- All Hearts Tour (with Robyn) (2010)
- Intimate Venues Tour (2014)
- Kaleidoscope 20th Anniversary Tour (2020)

Supporting act

- Area:One Tour (2001)
- Elevation Tour (2001)
- MTV2's Sisters for Hip-Hop & Soul Tour (2001)
- The Onyx Hotel Tour (2004)
- Hip Hop – Don't Stop (with Missy Elliott and Talib Kweli) (2004)
- Sugar Water Festival (2006)

== Filmography ==
List of television and films credits
Year	Title	Role	Notes
2003	Volcano High	Song (voiceover)	MTV dub TV movie
2004	Saturday Night Live	Musical Guest (Herself)	"Drew Barrymore/Kelis" (Season 29, Episode 12)
2007	Me and Mr. Jones	Herself	Reality television/Executive producer
2010	Freaknik: The Musical	Tyra Banks (voice)	TV movie
2011	Duran Duran: Unstaged	Herself	Direct-to-Video documentary
2011	Top Chef Masters	Quickfire Judge (Herself)	"Everything Old Is New Again" (Season 3, Episode 2)
2012	Fashion Police	Herself	Guest judge
2013	Brazzaville Teen-Ager	Herself	Short film
2014	Saucy & Sweet	Herself	Cooking special
2014	Hell's Kitchen	Herself	"12 Chef's Compete" (Season 13, Episode 7)
2014	Holiday Feast with Kelis	Herself	Cooking special
2017	Pitch Battle	Herself	Judge
2020	The Masked Singer	Herself / Daisy	Contestant, UK version
2020	Cooked with Cannabis	Herself	Host/Judge
2021	Selena + Chef	Herself	Guest star

== See also ==
- List of Afro-Latinos
- List of people from Harlem

Awards and achievements
Preceded by Macy Gray	BRIT Award for Best International Breakthrough Act; 2001	Succeeded by The Strokes
