= Food (Kelis album) =

Studio album by Kelis
- Released: April 18, 2014
- Recorded: 2013
- Studios: Federal Prism, Los Angeles
- Genres: Soul; R&B
- Length: 50:05
- Label: Ninja Tune
- Producers: Kelis; David Andrew Sitek; Stereotypes

Kelis chronology
Flesh Tone (2010)	Food (2014)	Live in London (2014)

Singles from Food
- 1. "Jerk Ribs" Released: February 14, 2014; 2. "Rumble" Released: April 11, 2014; 3. "Friday Fish Fry" Released: July 14, 2014

Food is the sixth studio album by American singer Kelis. It was released on April 18, 2014, becoming her first album released under Ninja Tune Records. Primarily an R&B and soul album with a diverse musical style that incorporates funk, Afrobeat, Memphis soul, and neo soul.

The album was viewed as a return to Kelis' previous music prior to Flesh Tone, and was described by Kelis as, "a kind of unspoken lovefest". The album was written by Kelis, alongside David Andrew Sitek, and Todd Simon, and was entirely produced by David Andrew Sitek and features guest performances by CSS and Priscilla Ahn. Upon release the album received mostly positive reviews from critics, who commended the album's production, composition and Kelis vocals. Commercially the album fared well making appearances on numerous charts worldwide, the album also entered the UK Albums Chart at number twenty, becoming Kelis's second highest-peaking album after Tasty in 2004. The album spawned three singles—"Jerk Ribs", "Rumble", and "Friday Fish Fry"—and was further promoted with a mini-concert.

== Recording ==
In a September 2011 interview, Kelis said that her sixth studio album would be finished "in the next few weeks". According to Kelis's management firm at the time, Three Six Zero Group, the album was to feature production from Skream, Burns, Tom Neville, Dan Black, and Caspa. She said of the album, "I've been on a real 1990s vibe with this record, it's kind of trip- hoppish ... it's more electro, it's a little deeper and darker". The Skream-produced single "Distance" received its UK radio premiere in June 2012. Kelis was featured on Skream's 2013 single "Copy Cat", which led to a dispute between the two after Kelis alleged that the producer refused to have her appear in the music video.

In April 2013, following reports that Kelis had been working with producer David Andrew Sitek of TV on the Radio, it was announced that she had signed to Sitek's own record label Federal Prism and was going to release two albums. In late 2013, it was announced that Kelis had signed to British independent label Ninja Tune for the release of the album, titled Food, in April 2014. Food is produced entirely by Sitek and contains influences of soul, funk, gospel, and Afrobeat—Kelis said of the album, "You know, those records in your life that your parents played and they resonate with who you are? They make you nostalgic. I wanted to find out how to get that feeling." She has spoken about the possibility of a follow-up release containing the 90s/trip hop-influenced material from the initial recording sessions for the album.

Kelis finished recording Food in late April 2013. The full details of the album were unveiled on January 28, 2014. It is entirely produced by Sitek and was recorded at his house in Los Angeles. According to the announcement on Ninja Tune's website reads, "the record mints a sound that's rootsy without ever being self-consciously retro, that pitches live horns and gospel-y organ against electronics, that for all its classic soul and funk influences, couldn't have been made any time but now."

== Composition ==
The album is a soul and R&B album that was seen as a return to Kelis' previous music before Flesh Tone, its music was described by the New York Daily News as being one of her, "most consistent and organic sound of her career", noting influence from Fela's Afrobeat, Memphis soul and classic R&B. The album's music was described as "shapeshifting" through a variety of sounds, styles and genres; taking influence from neo-soul, classic pop and smooth R&B. The album is predominantly a funk-soul album, with "warm, crackling horns" and intimate brass according to Ben Hewitt of Digital Spy who continued to describe the album as having "a rootsy warmth to the classic soul sounds, a mixture of classy brass, earthy guitars and simmering electronics". The production is characterized as containing a "dark bass, a warm organ, some spicy splashes of horns". Kelis, vocals on the album were described as breathy, smoky and sultry, which had an "authenticity" that helped turn the album's "skittering groove" and horns into an "infectious, laid-back" body of work.

The album's opening track "Breakfast" is introduced by Kelis' four-year-old son Knight Jones, who speaks the monologue; "Hey guys! Are you hungry? My mom made food." Kelis' son is the inspiration of this track which Billboard magazine described as "breezy". "Jerk Ribs" is a "feel good" song whose melody "soar[s] over funky horns and whistles". Andrew Hampp, of Billboard magazine, described the song as being a "brassy, funk-laced jam". The song also contains a live band and a full horn section. "Forever Be" is a pop song with horns and strings layered "on top of a burbling synth line reminiscent of Stevie Nicks' Stand Back". "Floyd", is a ballad that lyrically speaks about a "single mom looking for a man". "Runnin'" is a down-tempo "slow jam" that lyrically speaks "about turning down the limelight for a simpler life". Kelis' vocals are described as being "torchy" and "surrounded by a full band and cooing backup singers". "Hooch" contains "Stax-session soul" poured over "swoony midtempo" production.

"Cobbler" is a dancefloor song which Billboard described as being "James Brown-esque funk" workout, which lyrically speaks about a man who "has left a sweet taste in Kelis' mouth", the song ends with a key change, which Kelis uses her whistle octave. "Bless The Telephone" is an acoustic guitar ballad, which was originally performed by vocalist Labi Siffre, the song also doubles as a duet with Sal Masekela, who sings the melody along with Kelis. "Friday Fish Fry" contains a "sexy, B-movie chorus". "Change" is a "trippy" with a "cinematic" style, described as a "modern pop balladry". "Rumble", references her marriage to Nas, "Rumble" finds Kelis in "emotional turmoil with an ex". "Biscuits 'N Gravy" is a "hearty" song containing "hopeful, self-affirming lyrics" and "blaring" trumpets. The final track "Dreamer" is an "ethereal" song that "float[s] over a futuristic soul arrangement with poetic platitudes".

== Release and promotion ==
The album's artwork was designed by Leif Podhajsky. On April 7, 2014, Food (Amazon Artist Lounge EP) was released to download from Amazon for free. It contains live versions of "Rumble", "Biscuits n' Gravy" and "Bless the Telephone" performed and recorded at Metropolis Studios.

On March 4, 2014, Kelis performed the entire album live for music critics at Metropolis Studios in London. The mini-concert received critical acclaim. To further promote the album, Kelis cooked and served free gourmet meals from her food truck to the attendees at the South by Southwest festival in Austin, Texas, on March 13 and 14, 2014. The menu included jerk ribs with jerk barbecue sauce, duck confit sliders with ginger sesame glaze, shredded beef sliders with cherry barbecue sauce, and coleslaw.

"Jerk Ribs" was released on February 14, 2014, as the first single from the album. The track was made available as a free download from Kelis' official website starting April 2013. The music video for the single premiered on the Time website on February 18, 2014. "Rumble" was released as the album's second single on April 11, 2014. A few months after the album's release, in early June, it was announced that "Friday Fish Fry" would be released as the third single from the album on July 14.

== Critical reception ==
Professional ratings
Aggregate scores
Source	Rating
AnyDecentMusic?	7.5/10
Metacritic	77/100
Review scores
Source	Rating
AllMusic	4.5/5 stars
Chicago Tribune	3.5/4 stars
The Guardian	4/5 stars
The Independent	3/5 stars
Mojo	4/5 stars
NME	7/10
Pitchfork	6.3/10
Q	3/5 stars
Rolling Stone	3/5 stars
Spin	8/10

The album received mostly positive reviews from critics. Ben Hewitt's review for Digital Spy gave the album four out of five stars, concluding that it was "the most inventive dish she has served". In his review, Hewitt said "If music be the food of love, then the music of Food is a scoffer's indulgent delight". He also praised Sitek's rich electronic productions, that combined "earthy guitars" and "classy brass". The Independent's Andy Gill concluded that Kelis sounded more comfortable on Food than she did on previous album, Flesh Tone. He remarked, "Kelis now washes up at Ninja Tune with an album more in tune with her natural strengths which blend rolling funk grooves with punchy horn riffs." Fiona Shepherd, in writing for The Scotsman said, "It has been said that Food is not an R&B album. Maybe not as we understand the label now. But, like Janelle Monáe, Kelis harks back to old school rhythm'n'blues without playing the retro card and serves up some fine soul food instead." Clash's Will Salmon also said "Food is a fabulous and immediate record, rich with muted brass and low-key electronics. It's also the warmest, most relaxed and purely enjoyable thing Kelis has ever done. Wonderful."

== Track listing ==
All tracks are written by Kelis Rogers, David Andrew Sitek, and Todd Simon, except where noted. All tracks produced by Sitek.

Food – Standard edition
No.	Title	Length
1.	"Breakfast"	4:20
2.	"Jerk Ribs"	4:12
3.	"Forever Be"	3:32
4.	"Floyd"	4:59
5.	"Runnin'"	4:17
6.	"Hooch" (Rogers, Jeremy Reeves, Jonathan Yip, Ray Romulus, Ray Charles McCullough, Sitek, Simon)	3:29
7.	"Cobbler"	3:19
8.	"Bless the Telephone" (Labi Siffre)	2:31
9.	"Friday Fish Fry"	4:41
10.	"Change"	3:42
11.	"Rumble"	3:13
12.	"Biscuits n' Gravy"	4:23
13.	"Dreamer"	3:27
Total length:		50:05

Food – Japanese edition
No.	Title	Length
14.	"Rumble" (Breach Remix)	3:23
Total length:		53:28

Food – Deluxe edition
No.	Title	Length
1.	"Jerk Ribs" (Mount Kimbie remix)	3:48
2.	"Rumble" (Breach remix)	3:23
3.	"Runnin'" (Machinedrum remix)	5:14
4.	"Jerk Ribs" (Ben Pearce extended version)	5:56
5.	"Jerk Ribs" (Beatnik remix)	4:36
6.	"Rumble" (Breach extended dub)	6:29
7.	"Jerk Ribs" (Will Saul & Komon remix)	6:25
8.	"Rumble" (Actress Sixinium Bootleg mix)	5:20
Total length:		41:11

== Personnel ==
Credits were adapted from the liner notes of Food.

=== Musicians ===
- Arama Mara – backing vocals (tracks 1, 7)
- Jacob Najor – drums (tracks 1, 2, 5, 9, 11); backing vocals (track 9)
- Todd M. Simon – trumpet (tracks 1, 3, 5–7, 9, 11, 12); flugelhorn (tracks 5, 6, 12); backing vocals (track 9); horn arrangements, string arrangements
- David Andrew Sitek – bass (tracks 1–5, 7, 10–12); piano (tracks 1, 11–13); synth strings (tracks 1, 4, 5, 10); synth (tracks 2, 3, 10, 12, 13); keyboards (tracks 3, 5); Rhodes (track 4); Wurlitzer (tracks 5, 9); percussion (tracks 9, 10); backing vocals (track 10); drum programming (tracks 10, 13); drums (track 12); celesta (track 13)
- Tracy Wannomae – flute (tracks 1, 7); tenor saxophone (tracks 1, 9); bass clarinet (track 7); backing vocals (track 9)
- Rob Ackroyd – guitar (track 2)
- Alfredo "Fredo" Ortiz – percussion (tracks 2, 7); drums (track 7)
- Ikey Owens – keyboards (track 2); organ (track 4)
- Sam Robles – baritone saxophone (tracks 2, 7, 9, 11); backing vocals (track 9)
- Geoff Gallegos – alto saxophone, baritone saxophone (track 3)
- Thomas Lea – viola, violin
- Nate Morton – drums (track 3)
- Priscilla Ahn – backing vocals (tracks 4, 6, 7)
- Patrick Bailey – guitar (tracks 6, 8–10); backing vocals (track 9)
- Aaron Johnson – trombone (track 6)
- Itai Shapira – bass (tracks 6, 9); backing vocals (track 9)
- CSS – intro vocals (track 7)
- Alekasem (Sal Masakela) – vocals (track 8); backing vocals (track 10)
- Dave Cousin – backing vocals (track 10)
- Melvin Honoré – backing vocals, bass (track 10)

=== Technical ===
- David Andrew Sitek – production (all tracks); recording, mixing (track 6)
- Stereotypes – lead vocals production (track 6)
- Zeph Sowers – recording (track 6); engineering
- Matty Green – engineering
- Michael H. Brauer – mixing (tracks 1–5, 7–13)
- Mark Bengtson – mixing assistance, Pro Tools engineering (tracks 1–5, 7–13)
- Joe LaPorta – mastering

=== Artwork ===
- Leif Podhajsky – artwork, creative direction
- Kate Moross – creative consultation for album cover

== Charts ==
Food chart history
Chart (2014)	Peak position
Australian Albums (ARIA)	112
Austrian Albums (Ö3 Austria)	72
Belgian Albums (Ultratop Flanders)	40
Belgian Albums (Ultratop Wallonia)	49
Danish Albums (Hitlisten)	31
Dutch Albums (Album Top 100)	94
French Albums (SNEP)	145
German Albums (Offizielle Top 100)	81
Scottish Albums (Official Charts)	38
Swiss Albums (Schweizer Hitparade)	32
UK Albums (Official Charts)	20
UK Independent Albums (Official Charts)	4
UK R&B Albums (Official Charts)	4
US Billboard 200	73
US Independent Albums (Billboard)	12

== Release history ==
Food release history
Region	Date	Format	Label	Ref.
Australia	April 18, 2014	CD; LP; digital download	Ninja Tune	
Germany	April 18, 2014	CD; LP; digital download	Ninja Tune	
United Kingdom	April 21, 2014	CD; LP; digital download	Ninja Tune	
United States	April 22, 2014	CD; LP; digital download	Ninja Tune	
Japan	April 23, 2014	CD; digital download	Ninja Tune; Beat	
