= Nigga Please =

Studio album by Ol' Dirty Bastard
- Released: September 14, 1999
- Studios: Quad Recording, Chung King Studios, 36 Chambers (New York City); American (Los Angeles)
- Genre: East Coast hip-hop
- Length: 47:49
- Labels: Wu-Tang; Elektra
- Producers: Buddha Monk; Dat Nigga Reb; DL; Flavahood Productions; Irv Gotti; Mr. Fingers; The Neptunes; RZA; True Master

Ol' Dirty Bastard chronology
Return to the 36 Chambers: The Dirty Version (1995)	Nigga Please (1999)	The Trials and Tribulations of Russell Jones (2002)

Wu-Tang Clan solo chronology
Beneath the Surface (1999)	Nigga Please (1999)	Uncontrolled Substance (1999)

Singles from Nigga Please
- 1. "Got Your Money" Released: September 14, 1999

Professional ratings
Review scores
Source	Rating
AllMusic	4/5 stars
Alternative Press	3/5
Entertainment Weekly	C+
Los Angeles Times	3/4 stars
NME	9/10
Rolling Stone	4/5 stars
The Rolling Stone Album Guide	2/5 stars
The Source	4/5 stars
Spin	8/10
USA Today	3/4 stars

Nigga Please (stylized as N☆☆★A pLeASe) is the second and final studio album by American rapper and Wu-Tang Clan member Ol' Dirty Bastard. It was released on September 14, 1999, via Elektra Records. Recording sessions took place at Quad Recording Studios, at Chung King Studios and at 36 Chambers Studio in New York City, and at American Studios in Los Angeles. Production was handled by RZA, The Neptunes, Irv Gotti, Buddha Monk, Dat Nigga Reb, DL, Flavahood Productions, Mr. Fingers and True Master. It features guest appearances from 12 O'Clock, Kelis, La the Darkman, Lil' Mo, Pharrell Williams, Raison the Zukeeper, Shorty Shit Stain, and comedian Chris Rock.

In the United States, the album debuted at number 10 on the Billboard 200 and number two on the Top R&B/Hip-Hop Albums with 93,000 copies sold in the first week. It was certified Gold by the Recording Industry Association of America on December 6, 1999. The album also peaked at number 59 in Germany and number 64 in the Netherlands.

Its lead single, "Got Your Money", peaked at No. 11 in the UK, No. 33 in the US, No. 82 in France, No. 96 in the Netherlands, and was certified Silver by the British Phonographic Industry. The music video for "Got Your Money" was directed by Hype Williams.

It was the last album to be released in ODB's lifetime before his death on November 13, 2004, due to complications of a drug overdose.

== Album name ==
Before its release Ol' Dirty Bastard announced multiple title possibilities for the album, including God Made Dirt and Dirt Don't Hurt and The Black Man Is God, White Man Is the Devil. In a 1997 interview with MTV, which went unreleased until 2015, he said that the album might be called Dirty's World.

== Track listing ==
No.	Title	Writer(s)	Producer(s)	Length
1.	"Recognize" (featuring Chris Rock and Pharrell Williams)	Russell Tyrone Jones; Pharrell Lanscilo Williams; Charles Edward Hugo	The Neptunes	4:24
2.	"I Can't Wait"	Jones; Irving Lorenzo; Martin Fulterman	Dat Nigga Reb; Irv Gotti	3:59
3.	"Cold Blooded"	Jones; James Ambrose Johnson Jr.	The Neptunes	3:35
4.	"Got Your Money" (featuring Kelis)	Jones; Williams; Hugo	The Neptunes	3:59
5.	"Rollin' Wit You"	Jones; Lorenzo; Taiwan Green	Mr. Fingers; Irv Gotti	3:52
6.	"Gettin' High" (featuring Raison the Zukeeper, 12 O'Clock, La the Darkman and Shorty Shit Stain)	Jones; Raison Allah; Lason Jackson; Ellery Chambers	Buddha Monk	2:13
7.	"You Don't Want to Fuck With Me"	Jones; Lorenzo	DL; Irv Gotti	4:05
8.	"Nigga Please"	Jones; Robert Fitzgerald Diggs	RZA	2:49
9.	"Dirt Dog"	Jones; Chambers; Diggs	Buddha Monk; RZA (co.)	3:08
10.	"I Want Pussy"	Jones; Diggs	RZA	2:28
11.	"Good Morning Heartache" (featuring Lil' Mo)	Jones; Irene Higginbotham; Ervin Drake; Dan Fisher	Flavahood Productions	4:20
12.	"All in Together Now"	Jones; Derrick Harris; Diggs	True Master	4:42
13.	"Cracker Jack"	Jones; Diggs	RZA	4:02
Total length:				47:36

20th Anniversary bonus tracks
No.	Title	Writer(s)	Producer(s)	Length
14.	"Got Your Money" (Instrumental)		The Neptunes	4:03
15.	"Got Your Money" (DJ Dee Kline and Ed209 Breakbeat Mix)	Jones; Williams; Hugo	The Neptunes; DJ Dee Kline; Ed209	5:24
16.	"Got Your Money" (DJ Dee Kline and Ed209 Vocal Mix)	Jones; Williams; Hugo	The Neptunes; DJ Dee Kline; Ed209	5:22
17.	"Got Your Money" (Oxide Remix)	Jones; Williams; Hugo	The Neptunes; DJ Oxide	3:42
Total length:				66:09

Sample credits

- Track 2 contains excerpts from "Theme From T. J. Hooker" by Mark Snow
- Track 3 contains interpolations from the composition "Cold Blooded" by Rick James
- Track 4 contains samples from "Children's Story" by Slick Rick and "Nigga Please" from Dolemite
- Track 6 contains samples from "You Turn Me On" by Labelle
- Track 10 contains samples from "You've Made Me So Very Happy" by Blood, Sweat & Tears
- Track 12 contains samples from "65 Bars and a Taste of Soul" by Charles Wright & the Watts 103rd Street Rhythm Band
- Track 13 contains samples from "Group Introduction" by The Emotions

== Charts ==
=== Weekly charts ===
Chart (1999–2000)	Peak position
Canada Top Albums/CDs (RPM)	33
Canadian R&B Albums (Nielsen SoundScan)	4
Dutch Albums (Album Top 100)	64
German Albums (Offizielle Top 100)	59
US Billboard 200	10
US Top R&B/Hip-Hop Albums (Billboard)	2

=== Year-end charts ===
Chart (1999)	Position
US Top R&B/Hip-Hop Albums (Billboard)	82

== Certifications ==
Region	Certification	Certified units/sales
Canada (Music Canada)	Gold	50,000^{^}
United States (RIAA)	Gold	703,000
^{^} Shipments figures based on certification alone.
