= Osirus (album) =

Mixtape by Ol' Dirty Bastard
- Released: January 4, 2005
- Recorded: January 2002 – December 2004
- Genre: Hip-hop
- Label: Sure Shot
- Producers: Ol' Dirty Bastard; DJ Premier; CHOPS; Mark Ronson; Ill Will Fulton

Ol' Dirty Bastard chronology
The Trials and Tribulations of Russell Jones (2002)	Osirus (2005)	A Son Unique (2005)

Professional ratings
Review scores
Source	Rating
AllMusic	3.5/5 stars
Robert Christgau	(3-star Honorable Mention)
Entertainment.ie	3/5 stars
Exclaim!	(mixed)
Pitchfork	(6.4/10)
RapReviews	(8/10)
Rolling Stone	3/5 stars
The Situation	4/5 stars
Uncut	3/5 stars

Osirus is a posthumous mixtape album by Ol' Dirty Bastard released on January 4, 2005.

== Track listing ==
1. "Pop Shots" (prod. by DJ Premier)
2. "Dirty Dirty" (feat. Rhymefest)
3. "Go Go Go" (feat. Blahzay Blahzay)
4. "Who Can Make It Happen Like Dirt?"
5. "High in the Clouds" (feat. Black Rob)
6. "Rahzel Skit 1"
7. "Dirty Run"
8. "Stand Up" (feat. Cappadonna and Ghostface Killah)
9. "Don't Stop Ma (Out of Control)"
10. "If Ya'll Want War" (feat. Royal Flush)
11. "Pussy Keep Calling"
12. "Down South"
13. "Rahzel Skit 2"
14. "Caked Up" (feat. Baby Sham)
15. "Fuck Y'all"
16. "Move Back" (feat. The Lenox Ave. Boys, Jae Millz, Drag-On, Cardan and Terra Blacks)
17. "Fire" (Dirty Dirty Alt. Version)
18. "Pop Shots" (Clinton Sparks Remix)
