= Get Along with You =

2000 single by Kelis

Single by Kelis

from the album Kaleidoscope
- Released: April 10, 2000
- Studio: Master Sound (Virginia Beach)
- Genre: Pop; R&B
- Length: 4:27
- Label: Virgin
- Songwriters: Pharrell Williams; Chad Hugo
- Producer: The Neptunes

Kelis singles chronology
| "Caught Out There" (1999) | "Get Along with You" (2000) | "Good Stuff" (2000) |

"Get Along with You" is a song by American singer Kelis from her debut studio album, Kaleidoscope (1999). A staccato, pop and R&B ballad with a dark musical tone, "Get Along with You" describes how someone's love for and the need to "get along with" their love interest is more substantial than material possessions and even the world itself.

Released as the second single from Kaleidoscope in the US on April 10, 2000, "Get Along with You" was not a commercial success, failing to enter the US Billboard Hot 100. It was later released as the third and final single in Europe in October 2000, peaking at number 51 on the UK Singles Chart.

== Music video ==
The music video for "Get Along with You", directed by Paul Hunter, begins with Kelis, who is donning an all-black, gothic-like attire, standing in place. She proceeds to open her laced jacket to reveal a new "world" within herself. This "new world" shows Kelis standing in an empty street. She sings the first verse while flying around in a dark and gloomy city, as an orange gas comes out of her mouth every time she speaks. She then flies to a flower shop and looks inside, where she sees dead flowers that quickly come back to life. After coming out of a well, Kelis walks into a heavily wooded area, filled with trees. She then stands upon a giant telescope. Kelis wanders to a beach and sits holding a parasol, singing. The camera pans to Kelis' feet, and she is shown flying over the ocean, which she was previously viewing with dolphins swimming beneath her. After entering another iron gate, Kelis is shown as a doll and begins to disassemble herself. A light emits from her dismembered, clay body; the light shines brightly, illuminating the seas and the city within herself. In the closing of the song, the camera pans out, and Kelis closes the open "window" to her inner self.

The video premiered on BET the week ending on March 26, 2000.

== Track listings ==
- UK CD single
1. "Get Along with You" (Album Version) – 4:27
2. "Get Along with You" (DJ Dodge Soul Inside Radio Mix) – 3:58
3. "Get Along with You" (Bump & Flex Radio Edit) – 3:52
4. "Get Along with You" (Morales Radio Edit) – 3:46
5. "Get Along with You" (video)
- European CD single
1. "Get Along with You" (Pharrell Edit Version) – 4:12
2. "Get Along with You" (Bump & Flex Club Mix) – 6:29

== Charts ==
| Chart (2000) | Peak position |
|---|---|
| Iceland (Íslenski Listinn Topp 40) | 3 |
| Netherlands (Single Top 100) | 93 |
| Scotland Singles (OCC) | 71 |
| UK Singles (OCC) | 51 |
| UK Dance (OCC) | 7 |
| UK Hip Hop/R&B (OCC) | 6 |
| US Dance Club Songs (Billboard) | 19 |
| US Hot R&B/Hip-Hop Songs (Billboard) | 57 |

== Release history ==
Release dates and formats for "Get Along with You"
| Region | Date | Format(s) | Label(s) | Ref. |
|---|---|---|---|---|
| United States | April 10, 2000 | Rhythmic contemporary radio | Virgin | |
| France | October 3, 2000 | Maxi CD | EMI | |
| United Kingdom | October 9, 2000 | 12-inch vinyl; cassette; maxi CD | Virgin | |
