= Young, Fresh n' New =

Single by Kelis

from the album Wanderland
- B-side: "Daddy"; "The Spot"
- Released: September 25, 2001
- Studio: StarTrak Studios (Virginia Beach, Virginia)
- Genre: Funk; metal
- Length: 4:37
- Label: Virgin
- Songwriters: Kelis Rogers; Pharrell Williams; Charles Hugo
- Producer: The Neptunes

Kelis singles chronology
"Candy" (2001)	"Young, Fresh n' New" (2001)	"Finest Dreams" (2003)

"Young, Fresh n' New" is a song by American singer Kelis from her second studio album, Wanderland (2001). Kelis co-wrote the song with its producers, The Neptunes (consisting of Pharrell Williams and Chad Hugo). It was released on September 25, 2001, as the only single from the album. The single peaked at number 32 on the UK Singles Chart. In the United States, however, it became her third consecutive single to miss the Billboard Hot 100. Nevertheless, German producer Timo Maas' remix of the song managed to chart on Billboard's Hot Dance Club Play at number 15 in January 2002. The accompanying music video was directed by Diane Martel and filmed in Los Angeles over the weekend of June 9–10, 2001.

== Critical reception ==
"Young, Fresh n' New" received positive reviews from music critics. Rupert Howe from Blender referred to the song as "a delirious four and a half minutes of rasping, intergalactic funk which sounds as if it was recorded in the engine room of the U.S.S. Enterprise", while noting that "there's a tripped-out, space-vixen vitality to Kelis's vocals, as if she's no longer overawed by the mad skills of her production Svengalis." Sal Cinquemani of Slant Magazine described it as "a track ripe with the production duo's signature electronic synth spirals and industrial-strength basslines." Andy Kellman of AllMusic wrote that the song is "particularly stunning, a buzzing grind with a chaotic loop that could've been lifted from a pinball machine. As a song, it doesn't have much grounding, yet the Neptunes cast their disorienting eccentricities all over it and come up with a production that could've only been suited for Kelis." NME reviewer Victoria Segal called the song "startling" and stated that "[t]here's sudden splashes of synthetic soul sighing, perfectly timed shouts of 'hey!', an unsettling underage vibe in the lyrics and a vocal that doesn't so much drip attitude as oil-spill it."

== Track listings ==
- UK CD single and European CD maxi single
1. "Young, Fresh n' New" (UK radio edit) – 3:30
2. "Young, Fresh n' New" (Timo Maas remix – full vocal) – 7:03
3. "Young, Fresh n' New" (So Solid remix – full vocal) – 5:42
4. "Young, Fresh n' New" (video) – 3:30
- European CD single
1. "Young, Fresh n' New" (UK radio edit) – 3:30
2. "Young, Fresh n' New" (Timo Maas Remix – full vocal) – 7:03
- UK 12" single

A1. "Young, Fresh n' New" – 4:37
A2. "Young, Fresh n' New" (So Solid remix – vocal mix) – 5:42
B1. "Young, Fresh n' New" (Timo Maas remix – full vocal) – 7:03

- US 12" single

A1. "Young, Fresh n' New" (radio edit) – 3:38
A2. "Young, Fresh n' New" (album instrumental) – 4:37
A3. "Daddy" (featuring Malice of Clipse) – 3:50
B1. "The Spot" – 3:58
B2. "The Spot" (instrumental) – 3:58
B3. "Daddy" (instrumental) – 3:50

== Charts ==
Chart (2001–02)	Peak position
Netherlands (Single Top 100)	89
Scottish Singles Sales (Official Charts)	41
UK Singles (Official Charts)	32
UK Dance (Official Charts)	6
UK Hip Hop/R&B (Official Charts)	8
US Dance Club Songs (Billboard) Timo Maas remix	15
