= Good Stuff (Kelis song) =

2000 single by Kelis

Single by Kelis featuring Terrar

from the album Kaleidoscope
- Released: June 5, 2000
- Studio: Master Sound (Virginia Beach)
- Genre: R&B; hip hop
- Length: 3:52
- Label: Virgin
- Songwriters: Pharrell Williams; Chad Hugo
- Producer: The Neptunes

Kelis singles chronology
"Get Along with You" (2000)	"Good Stuff" (2000)	"What It Is" (2001)

Terrar singles chronology
"Good Stuff" (2000)	"Run Away (I Wanna Be with U)" (2001)

Music video
- "Good Stuff" on YouTube

"Good Stuff" is a song by American singer Kelis from her debut studio album, Kaleidoscope (1999). Written and produced by the Neptunes, the song features guest vocals from American rapper Pusha T (then known as Terrar), one half of the hip hop duo Clipse. "Good Stuff" was released as the second single from Kaleidoscope outside the United States on June 5, 2000, by Virgin Records. It managed to achieve moderate success in select European markets, but nevertheless earned Kelis a second top-20 entry on the UK Singles Chart, peaking at number 19.

== Track listings ==
- UK CD 1
1. "Good Stuff" (Album Version) – 3:52
2. "Good Stuff" (Forces of Nature Radio Edit Mix) – 3:23
3. "Good Stuff" (Junior's Transatlantic Mix) – 11:02
4. "Good Stuff" (video) – 4:22
- UK CD 2
1. "Good Stuff" (UK Radio Edit) – 3:17
2. "Good Stuff" (Forces of Nature Sunami Vocal Mix) – 6:07
3. "Good Stuff" (Junior's Radio Edit) – 4:42
- Cassette single
1. "Good Stuff" (UK Radio Edit) – 3:17
2. "Good Stuff" (Forces of Nature Radio Edit Mix) – 3:23
3. "Good Stuff" (Junior's Radio Edit) – 4:42

== Charts ==
=== Weekly charts ===
Weekly chart performance for "Good Stuff"
Chart (2000)	Peak position
Australia (ARIA)	132
Belgium (Ultratop 50 Flanders)	41
Belgium (Ultratip Bubbling Under Wallonia)	5
Europe (Eurochart Hot 100 Singles)	59
Germany (GfK)	72
Iceland (Íslenski Listinn Topp 40)	3
Ireland (IRMA)	49
Netherlands (Dutch Top 40 Tipparade)	16
Netherlands (Single Top 100)	78
Scotland Singles (OCC)	26
Sweden (Sverigetopplistan)	44
Switzerland (Schweizer Hitparade)	74
UK Singles (OCC)	19
UK Hip Hop/R&B (OCC)	6

=== Year-end charts ===
Year-end chart performance for "Good Stuff"
Chart (2000)	Position
Iceland (Íslenski Listinn Topp 40)	54

== Release history ==
Release dates and formats for "Good Stuff"
Region	Date	Format(s)	Label(s)	Ref.
United Kingdom	June 5, 2000	Cassette; two maxi CDs	Virgin	
United Kingdom	June 12, 2000	12-inch vinyl	Virgin	
France	June 14, 2000	Maxi CD	EMI	
France	August 29, 2000	12-inch vinyl	EMI	
