= Wanderland =

2001 studio album by Kelis

Studio album by Kelis
- Released: October 17, 2001
- Recorded: 2000–2001
- Studio: StarTrak (Virginia Beach, Virginia) (Note: Except "Flash Back"); Master Sound (Virginia Beach, Virginia) (Note: "Flash Back")
- Genre: Soul; funk; bossa nova; R&B
- Length: 62:54
- Label: Virgin
- Producer: The Neptunes

Kelis chronology
Kaleidoscope (1999)	Wanderland (2001)	Tasty (2003)

Singles from Wanderland
- 1. "Young, Fresh n' New" Released: October 1, 2001

Wanderland is the second studio album by American singer Kelis, released on October 17, 2001, by Virgin Records. The album's only single, "Young, Fresh n' New", peaked at number 32 on the UK Singles Chart. As of October 2004, Wanderland had sold 17,000 copies in the United Kingdom.

== Background and release ==
According to Kelis, Virgin Records did not understand Wanderland. She subsequently left the label around the time of the album's European release, and as a result, the album was not released in the United States. Wanderland was officially released in the US to digital retailers on May 31, 2019, and to streaming services on June 5 under RCA Records.

The song "Flash Back" (retitled "Flashback") was included on Kelis' subsequent album Tasty, while a new version of "Popular Thug", which replaced Pusha T of Clipse with Nas, appears on the Neptunes' 2003 compilation album Clones.

== Critical reception ==
Professional ratings
Review scores
Source	Rating
AllMusic	3.5/5 stars
Blender	4/5 stars
Entertainment Weekly	B−
entertainment.ie	4/5 stars
The Guardian	4/5 stars
NME	6/10
Rolling Stone	3.5/5 stars
The Rolling Stone Album Guide	1.5/5 stars
Slant Magazine	3/5 stars

Wanderland received generally positive reviews from music critics. The Guardian critic Alexis Petridis described the music as "clever, exhilarating and original" and praised the album as The Neptunes' "most adventurous work to date". Mark Bautz of Entertainment Weekly commented that "Kelis' brash blend of Curtis Mayfield soul, techno-Zeppelin funk, Jobim-lite bossa nova, and ultrasmooth R&B shows a more coherent artistry than many recent boundary-busting experiments." Rupert Howe of Blender found that "[t]he best thing about Wanderland is that [Kelis] seems finally to have begun celebrating her eccentricities", adding, "Aside from the idiosyncratic lyrics [...] she switchbacks from parodying '70s mack-stylin' (the Funkadelic 'Daddy') to an '80s soul croon ('Scared Money')." At entertainment.ie, Andrew Lynch commended Kelis' "aggressive vocal delivery and intriguing, if sometimes confusing lyrical imagery", while calling the album itself "[b]rilliantly produced" and "strikingly original".

Rolling Stone's Barry Walters noted that, musically, Wanderland "doesn't venture far from its predecessor, Kaleidoscope: The Neptunes are still matching jaunty beats to techno sonics. But her pen is busier now, and the result is smarter, more nuanced but no less confrontational." Andy Kellman of AllMusic stated that "the album's first three songs—'Young, Fresh n' New,' 'Flash Back,' and 'Popular Thug'—are on an even standing with the best of the singer's debut [...] After that solid beginning, the album continually loses steam and gains it back." Stephen Dalton of NME viewed the album as "a solid sophomore effort", but felt that "there is way too much filler here for a hotly hyped alterna-soul princess with her eyes on the big prize." Sal Cinquemani of Slant Magazine opined that the album is "far from rote, but the Neptunes's rehashed retro beats and synths are beginning to sound derivative of Britney Spears's 'I'm a Slave 4 U.' Much of the disc's hooks are unchallenging and repetitive at best." In The New Rolling Stone Album Guide (2004), Ernest Hardy and Arion Berger were critical of the album, writing that "[t]he beats that brought Kaleidoscope to life are gone, and only Kelis' hippieish and overly self-aware songwriting remains."

== Track listing ==
No.	Title	Writer(s)	Length
1.	"Intro"	Pharrell Williams; Chad Hugo; Kelis Rogers	1:11
2.	"Young, Fresh n' New"	Williams; Hugo; Rogers	4:37
3.	"Flash Back"	Williams; Hugo; Rogers	3:26
4.	"Popular Thug" (featuring Pusha T of Clipse)	Williams; Hugo; Terrence Thornton	4:13
5.	"Daddy" (featuring Malice of Clipse)	Williams; Hugo; Gene Thornton	3:50
6.	"Scared Money"	Williams; Hugo; Rogers	4:00
7.	"Shooting Stars"	Williams; Hugo; Rogers	6:17
8.	"Digital World" (featuring Roscoe)	Williams; Hugo; Amir Porter	4:25
9.	"Perfect Day"	Williams; Hugo; Gwen Stefani; Tom Dumont; Tony Kanal	3:56
10.	"Easy Come, Easy Go"	Williams; Hugo; Rogers; George Clinton; Abrim Tilmon; Bernard Worrell; William Collins; Lorenzo Patterson; Eric Wright; André Young	3:31
11.	"Junkie"	Williams; Hugo; Rogers	2:56
12.	"Get Even"	Williams; Hugo	4:12
13.	"Mr. U.F.O. Man" (featuring John Ostby)	Williams; Hugo; Rogers	4:27
14.	"Little Suzie" "Star Wars" "I Don't Care Anymore"	Williams; Hugo; Rogers	11:48
Total length:			62:54

Japanese edition / 2019 streaming bonus track
No.	Title	Writer(s)	Length
15.	"Smells Like Teen Spirit" (live – edited version)	Kurt Cobain; Dave Grohl; Krist Novoselic	4:38
Total length:			67:32

2020 digital edition (individual tracks)
No.	Title	Writer(s)	Length
15.	"Smells Like Teen Spirit" (live – edited version)	Cobain; Grohl; Novoselic	4:36
16.	"Star Wars"	Williams; Hugo; Rogers	3:06
17.	"I Don't Care Anymore"	Phil Collins	3:48
Total length:			74:24

Notes

- "Easy Come, Easy Go" contains replayed elements from "Eazy-Duz-It" by Eazy-E.
- "Little Suzie" contains two hidden tracks: "Star Wars" and a cover of "I Don't Care Anymore" by Phil Collins.

== Personnel ==
Credits adapted from the liner notes of Wanderland.

=== Musicians ===
- Kelis – vocals
- The Neptunes – instruments, arrangements
- Tony Kanal – bass guitar (track 9)
- Tom Dumont – guitar (track 9)
- Adrian Young – drums (track 9)
- Fieldy – live bass (track 10)
- C Minus – scratches (track 10)

=== Technical ===
- The Neptunes – production, executive production
- Andrew Coleman – engineering (tracks 1–8, 11–14)
- Brian Garten – engineering (tracks 9, 10)
- Ken "Duro" Ifill – mixing (tracks 1, 2, 4–8, 10–14)
- Serban Ghenea – mixing (tracks 3, 9)
- Rob Walker – executive production

=== Artwork ===
- Michelle Laurita – cover photography
- Pauline St. Denis – inside photography

== Charts ==
Chart performance for Wanderland
Chart (2001)	Peak position
French Albums (SNEP)	133
Swiss Albums (Schweizer Hitparade)	79
UK Albums (OCC)	78
UK R&B Albums (OCC)	13

== Release history ==
Release history for Wanderland
Region	Date	Label	Ref.
Japan	October 17, 2001	EMI	
Germany	October 26, 2001	EMI	
United Kingdom	October 29, 2001	Virgin	
France	November 1, 2001	EMI	
