= Kaleidoscope (Kelis album) =

Studio album by Kelis
- Released: December 7, 1999
- Recorded: 1998–1999
- Studios: Master Sound (Virginia Beach, Virginia) (Note: Except "Wouldn't You Agree"); Windmark (Virginia Beach, Virginia) (Note: "Wouldn't You Agree")
- Genre: R&B
- Length: 61:37
- Label: Virgin
- Producer: The Neptunes

Kelis chronology
Kaleidoscope (1999)	Wanderland (2001)

Singles from Kaleidoscope
- 1. "Caught Out There" Released: October 5, 1999; 2. "Get Along with You" Released: April 10, 2000; 3. "Good Stuff" Released: June 5, 2000

Kaleidoscope is the debut studio album by American singer Kelis. It was released on December 7, 1999, by Virgin Records, and was produced entirely by the Neptunes. Despite underperforming in the United States, the album saw mild success in certain international markets, including the United Kingdom, where it charted at number 43 and was certified gold.

Kaleidoscope was reissued on February 21, 2020, in celebration of its 20th anniversary. The extended digital release features edits and club remixes, including a Neptunes extended remix of "Caught Out There". The physical edition was pressed to translucent orange vinyl and was released in a two-set on March 6, 2020.

== Critical reception ==
Professional ratings
Review scores
Source	Rating
AllMusic	4.5/5 stars
Entertainment Weekly	B+
The Guardian	4/5 stars
Melody Maker	3/5 stars
NME	9/10
Q	4/5 stars
Rolling Stone	3.5/5 stars
Spin	6/10
Uncut	8/10
The Village Voice	A−

Kaleidoscope received widespread acclaim from music critics. AllMusic editor Jaime Sunao Ikeda remarked that the album "showcases the development of a great talent [...] It's when Kelis and her production team create tracks that best fit her voice and uniqueness that the end results are outstanding. Although comparisons to Neneh Cherry are inevitable, she does carve out a niche for herself, armed with undeniable talent." Music Week gave the album a positive review saying that it was, "A strong debut from one of the brightest female faces to appear on the R&B scene in recent years"; overall, they felt it would be unfair to just concentrate on Caught out there, "as the whole album displays talent". NME called Kaleidoscope a "futuristic, visionary, multi-layered work of R&B, funk, soul and rap, furnished with an inspirational, psychedelic spirituality, rarely seen but desperately needed in these cynical times" and concluded: "Uplifting, magical, genre-bending music, if there’s a better debut album this year, bring it on. We need more like this." Q's Kerry Potter described Kaleidoscope as "an album that packs punches of the Mike Tyson variety and oozes confidence from every beat [...] Kaleidoscope isn't just a promising debut, it's an inspired one."

Entertainment Weekly's Britt Robson found that the album "fleshes out her persona with petulant sass and roller-rink whimsy, pegging her romantic maturity halfway between Brandy and Mary J. But what lingers are the minimalist staccato beats from production duo the Neptunes." Rolling Stone critic Arion Berger wrote that Kaleidoscope was "too musically adventurous and emotionally ambivalent to employ any one attitude. Plumbing retro styles is the easy resort of the hip-hop eclecticist, but somehow Kelis' background in jazz, gospel, rock and R&B; brings a deeply felt sonic futurism to her debut album [...] The Neptunes makes this interplanetary power-girl mix sound both danceably down-to-earth and shockingly new." In 2020, the magazine ranked the album at number 391 on their updated list of the "500 Greatest Albums of All Time".

== Commercial performance and singles ==
Kaleidoscope peaked at number 144 on the Billboard 200, and as of November 2006, it had sold 249,000 copies in the United States. The album fared better in Europe, where all three singles—"Caught Out There", "Good Stuff", and "Get Along with You"—attained moderate commercial success. Kaleidoscope reached number 43 on the UK Albums Chart and was certified gold by the British Phonographic Industry (BPI). By October 2004, the album had sold 167,000 copies in the United Kingdom.

After reaching number 52 on the UK Singles Chart on imports alone, "Caught Out There" was given a proper release in the UK, eventually peaking at number four. "Good Stuff" also proved a modest success, reaching number 19 on the UK chart. The third and final single from the album, "Get Along with You", was her first solo release to miss the top 40, reaching number 51.

In an interview with The Guardian in January 2020, Kelis stated that she never earned any money from sales of her first two albums, adding that she was "blatantly lied to and tricked" by the production team with whom she had signed, at the age of 19.

== Track listing ==
All tracks are written by Pharrell Williams and Chad Hugo, except where noted.

No.	Title	Writer(s)	Length
1.	"Intro"		1:55
2.	"Good Stuff" (featuring Terrar)		3:52
3.	"Caught Out There"		4:51
4.	"Get Along with You"		4:27
5.	"Mafia" (featuring Markita)		4:18
6.	"Game Show"		5:04
7.	"Suspended"	Kelis Rogers; Williams; Hugo	4:53
8.	"Mars"		5:15
9.	"Ghetto Children" (featuring Marc Dorsey and N.E.R.D)	Williams; Hugo; Ricky Walters	4:48
10.	"I Want Your Love"		4:14
11.	"No Turning Back"		4:10
12.	"Roller Rink"	Rogers; Williams; Hugo	4:58
13.	"In the Morning"	Rogers; Williams; Hugo	4:20
14.	"Wouldn't You Agree" (featuring Justin Vince)		4:32
Total length:			61:37

Japanese edition bonus tracks
No.	Title	Length
15.	"Caught Out There" (The Neptunes Extended Mix)	6:22
Total length:		67:59

20th anniversary reissue bonus tracks
No.	Title	Length
16.	"Get Along with You" (Morales Club Mix) (digital edition only)	3:42
17.	"Get Along with You" (Soul Inside Radio Mix)	4:00
18.	"Get Along with You" (Mix Show Version)	4:33
19.	"Get Along with You" (Pharrell Edit)	4:13
20.	"Get Along with You" (Bump & Flex Radio Edit) (digital edition only)	3:54
Total length:		88:21

=== Sample credits ===
- "Ghetto Children" contains elements from "Hey Young World" by Slick Rick.

== Personnel ==
Credits adapted from the liner notes of Kaleidoscope.

=== Musicians ===
- Kelis – vocals
- The Neptunes – instruments, arrangements
- Terrar – vocals (track 2)
- Markita – vocals (track 5)
- Marc Dorsey – vocals (track 9)
- N.E.R.D – vocals (track 9)
- Justin Vince – vocals (track 14)
- Nicole Wray – background vocals (track 14)
- Kenny Wray – background vocals (track 14)

=== Technical ===
- The Neptunes – production, executive production
- Dave Hummel – engineering
- Andrew Coleman – engineering
- Şerban Ghenea – mixing (tracks 1–9, 11–14)
- Ken "Duro" Ifill – mixing (track 10)
- Rob Walker – executive production

=== Artwork ===
- Len Peltier – art direction
- A³DTB / D Thom Bissett – design
- Me Company – hummingbird character and logo
- Jonathan Mannion – photography
- Steven Klein – photography

== Charts ==
Chart performance for Kaleidoscope
Chart (2000)	Peak position
Australian Charts (ARIA)	136
Belgian Albums (Ultratop Flanders)	32
Canadian R&B Albums (Nielsen SoundScan)	26
Dutch Albums (Album Top 100)	50
German Albums (Offizielle Top 100)	73
New Zealand Albums (RMNZ)	46
Scottish Albums (Official Charts)	65
Swedish Albums (Sverigetopplistan)	47
Swiss Albums (Schweizer Hitparade)	92
UK Albums (Official Charts)	43
UK R&B Albums (Official Charts)	7
US Billboard 200	144
US Top R&B/Hip-Hop Albums (Billboard)	23

== Certifications ==
Certifications for Kaleidoscope
Region	Certification	Certified units/sales
United Kingdom (BPI)	Gold	167,000

== Release history ==
Release history for Kaleidoscope
Region	Date	Label	Ref.
United States	December 7, 1999	Virgin	
United Kingdom	February 28, 2000	Virgin	
New Zealand	March 6, 2000	EMI	
Japan	March 8, 2000	EMI	
Australia	April 17, 2000	EMI	
