= Caught Out There =

1999 single by Kelis

Single by Kelis

from the album Kaleidoscope
- B-side: "Suspended"
- Released: October 5, 1999
- Studio: Master Sound (Virginia Beach)
- Genre: R&B
- Length: 4:51
- Label: Virgin
- Songwriters: Pharrell Williams; Chad Hugo
- Producer: The Neptunes

Kelis singles chronology
"Got Your Money" (1999)	"Caught Out There" (1999)	"Get Along with You" (2000)

Audio sample
- file; help

Music video
- "Caught Out There" on YouTube

"Caught Out There" is a song by American singer Kelis, released on October 5, 1999, as her debut single and as the lead single from her first studio album, Kaleidoscope (1999). Written and produced by the Neptunes, the song peaked at number 54 on the US Billboard Hot 100 but fared better outside the United States, reaching the top 10 in Canada, Iceland, Italy, the Netherlands, Sweden, and the United Kingdom. Pharrell Williams of the Neptunes said in an interview that the instrumental track was originally meant for rapper Busta Rhymes, who rejected it.

== Critical reception ==
Quentin Harrison of Albumism stated that Kelis is "burning with righteous anger" on the song, noting that she is "all heart with a hint of hedonism". He added that "Caught Out There" was "[the] only one song [that] could announce Kelis with a bang", when her debut album was launched. AllMusic editor Jaime Sunao Ikeda picked it as a "standout" track of the Kaleidoscope album. Daryl Easlea for the BBC said in his 2012 review that "it still steals the show today, and was one of those songs that was heard everywhere at the time." Swedish newspaper Expressen stated that "over a crunchy beat, she makes up with a lying boyfriend". Brian Rusnica from The Heights described it as a "five minute explosion of emotion and female rage featuring the raw chorus, "I hate you so much right now!"". Ireland's Evening Herald stated that the song "established her as a leading light on the music scene", while the Irish Independent called it "shouty".

Jim Wirth from NME commented, "Men, men, men; we're untrustworthy, lying scoundrels at heart, and as this Harlem-based hip-hop soulster rightly points out, we're always at our worst shortly after we've gone through the old 'I love you' routine. Kelis knows the score, though, because on Valentine's Day last year, some no-good, scum-sucking wretch did the dirty on her. Still, he did her a favour in the end, because 'Caught Out There', with its unforgettable primal-scream refrain, looks set to be massive very soon. Stretched out over a spartan backbeat, it would be a cynical swine who would dismiss this titanic slab of breakbeat pop as Jimmy Nail's 'Ain't No Doubt' but, y'know, for girls." Another editor stated that Kelis's "honeyed vocal, which broke into unfiltered madness, was the thing that took this track over the top." Sal Cinquemani from Slant wrote that it "proves why Kelis's legacy should extend beyond simply bringing the boys to the yard. No, she wasn't "the first girl to scream on a track", as she claims on 2006's "Bossy", but her debut single, released when she was a 19-year-old with pink eyebrows, not only became a girl-power anthem thanks to its livid hook and indignant lyrics, but helped announced the Neptunes as one of the premier superstar production teams of 21st-century pop music." A reviewer from Sunday Life deemed it as "attentiongrabbing".

== Music video ==
The music video for "Caught Out There" was directed by Hype Williams. In the video, Kelis, in her technicolor spiral afro, blond, gold, orange, red, and fuchsia hair, starts in a confessional style, before opening to the chorus where she rips up the living room. Afterwards, Kelis and a group of fed-up women boycott and picket men. Finally, as she sings, "Got something for y'all", a gun cock is heard and the video finishes by alluding to her exacting revenge for her former lover's infidelity.

The video premiered on BET the week ending on October 10, 1999.

== Impact and legacy ==
The song was used on MuchMusic's Shortest Weddings special. The signature yell "I hate you so much right now!" was used in the Daria episode "Partner's Complaint", first aired on February 25, 2000, and later in 2009 in British children's television sitcom Hotel Trubble. It was also used in BBC3's Most Annoying People 2007, under Tony Blair (8 on the list), and in 2011 in a Calvin Klein ad for CK One. In 2010, the line "look, I found her red coat" was sampled extensively in the James Blake song "CMYK". In 2003, Q magazine ranked "Caught Out There" at number 649 in their list of the "1001 Best Songs Ever".

In 2010, Pitchfork named it the 161st-best track of the 1990s. They wrote, "Soundtracking this post-breakup mania is a top-rate, ahead-of-its-time Neptunes production, with snapping keyboards accompanied by high-pitched tones that sound like dynamite exploding in space. In a word: Damn." In 2012, NME placed the song at number 24 on its list of the "100 Best Songs of the 1990s". In 2012, Porcys listed the song at number 24 in their ranking of "100 Singles 1990-1999", adding, "Here's the classic Kelis at its best. A perfect, uncommon bit of Neptunes in the foreground is the perfection of this protest- or rather statement-song." In 2021, American rapper Ashnikko sampled the song in her single "Deal with It", which also features Kelis as a guest artist.

== Track listings ==
- US and Australian CD single
1. "Caught Out There" (single radio edit) – 4:09
2. "Caught Out There" (The Neptunes extended mix) – 6:22
3. "Caught Out There" (LP version) – 4:51
4. "Caught Out There" (The Neptunes extended instrumental mix) – 6:22
- US 12-inch single

A1. "Caught Out There" (The Neptunes extended mix) – 6:22
A2. "Caught Out There" (The Neptunes extended instrumental mix) – 6:22
A3. "Caught Out There" (LP version) – 4:51
B1. "Caught Out There" (extended edit) – 5:52
B2. "Caught Out There" (single radio edit) – 4:09
B3. "Caught Out There" (single radio edit—no rap intro) – 4:09

- US cassette single

A1. "Caught Out There" (LP version) – 4:51
A2. "Caught Out There" (single radio edit) – 4:09
B1. "Caught Out There" (The Neptunes extended mix) – 6:22

- UK CD single
1. "Caught Out There" (UK radio edit) – 3:36
2. "Caught Out There" (The Neptunes extended mix) – 6:23
3. "Suspended" – 4:53
4. "Caught Out There" (video)
- UK 12-inch single

A1. "Caught Out There" (The Neptunes extended mix) – 6:23
A2. "Caught Out There" (The Neptunes extended instrumental mix) – 6:23
B1. "Suspended" – 4:53

- UK cassette single
1. "Caught Out There" (UK radio edit) – 3:36
2. "Caught Out There" (The Neptunes extended mix) – 6:23
3. "Suspended" – 4:53
- European CD single
1. "Caught Out There" (single radio edit) – 4:09
2. "Caught Out There" (The Neptunes extended mix) – 6:22

== Charts ==
=== Weekly charts ===
Weekly chart performance for "Caught Out There"
Chart (1999–2000)	Peak position
Australia (ARIA)	26
Belgium (Ultratop 50 Flanders)	15
Belgium (Ultratop 50 Wallonia)	14
Canada (Nielsen SoundScan)	10
Europe (European Hot 100 Singles)	9
France (SNEP)	96
Germany (GfK)	40
Iceland (Íslenski Listinn Topp 20)	5
Ireland (IRMA)	23
Italy (FIMI)	10
Italy Airplay (Music & Media)	2
Netherlands (Dutch Top 40)	3
Netherlands (Single Top 100)	4
New Zealand (Recorded Music NZ)	32
Norway (VG-lista)	11
Scotland Singles (Official Charts)	6
Sweden (Sverigetopplistan)	10
Switzerland (Schweizer Hitparade)	35
UK Singles (Official Charts)	4
UK Dance (Official Charts)	8
UK Hip Hop/R&B (Official Charts)	1
US Billboard Hot 100	54
US Hot R&B/Hip-Hop Songs (Billboard)	9
US Rhythmic Airplay (Billboard)	37

=== Year-end charts ===
Year-end chart performance for "Caught Out There"
Chart (2000)	Position
Belgium (Ultratop 50 Flanders)	93
Belgium (Ultratop 50 Wallonia)	82
Iceland (Íslenski Listinn Topp 20)	38
Netherlands (Dutch Top 40)	60
Netherlands (Single Top 100)	68
Sweden (Hitlistan)	79
UK Singles (OCC)	87
UK Urban (Music Week)	10
US Hot R&B/Hip-Hop Singles & Tracks (Billboard)	77

== Certifications ==
Certifications for "Caught Out There"
Region	Certification	Certified units/sales
United Kingdom (BPI)	Silver	200,000^{‡}
^{‡} Sales+streaming figures based on certification alone.

== Release history ==
Release dates and formats for "Caught Out There"
Region	Date	Format(s)	Label(s)	Ref.
United States	October 5, 1999	Rhythmic contemporary radio	Virgin	
United States	November 16, 1999	12-inch vinyl; cassette; maxi CD	Virgin	
France	December 13, 1999	12-inch vinyl	EMI	
United Kingdom	February 21, 2000	12-inch vinyl; cassette; maxi CD	Virgin	
France	May 16, 2000	CD	EMI	
