= Got Your Money =

1999 single by Ol' Dirty Bastard

Single by Ol' Dirty Bastard featuring Kelis

from the album Nigga Please
- B-side: "I Can't Wait"; "Cold Blooded" (amended)
- Released: September 14, 1999
- Length: 4:01
- Label: Elektra
- Songwriters: Russell Jones; Pharrell Williams; Chad Hugo
- Producer: The Neptunes

Ol' Dirty Bastard singles chronology
"Ghetto Supastar (That Is What You Are)" (1998)	"Got Your Money" (1999)	"Where's Your Money?" (2005)

Kelis singles chronology
"Got Your Money" (1999)	"Caught Out There" (1999)

Music video
- "Got Your Money" on YouTube

"Got Your Money" is a song by American rapper Ol' Dirty Bastard, released in September 1999 as the only single from his second studio album, Nigga Please. Both the single and the album were the last to be released by Ol' Dirty Bastard, before his death in 2004. The song, produced by the Neptunes, features American R&B singer Kelis, who sings the chorus—it marked one of her first appearances on record, before the release of her debut single the following month. "Got Your Money" charted in several countries, peaking at number 33 in the United States and number 11 in the United Kingdom. The song was ranked number 255 on NME's "500 Greatest Songs of All Time", published in 2014.

== Music video ==
The music video for "Got Your Money" uses footage from the 1975 blaxploitation film Dolemite. No new footage of ODB was filmed for the video. Footage of ODB was taken from the 1995 music video for "Shimmy Shimmy Ya". It also features Kelis, with Beverly Peele and Tangi Miller as backup dancers. Pitchfork Media included the video on its list of the "Top 50 Music Videos of the 1990s".

== Track listings ==
US maxi-CD single

1. "Got Your Money" (amended version)
2. "Got Your Money" (instrumental)
3. "Got Your Money" (acappella)
4. "I Can't Wait" (amended version)
5. "I Can't Wait" (instrumental)
6. "I Can't Wait" (acappella)
7. "Cold Blooded" (amended version)

UK cassette single

1. "Got Your Money" (dirty version) – 4:03
2. "Got Your Money" (DJ Dee Kline and ED209 Breakbeat mix) – 5:20

UK CD single

1. "Got Your Money" (dirty version) – 4:03
2. "Got Your Money" (DJ Dee Kline and ED209 Breakbeat mix) – 5:20
3. "Got Your Money" (DJ Dee Kline and ED209 vocal mix) – 5:20
4. "Got Your Money" (enhanced video)

German CD single

1. "Got Your Money" (amended version) – 4:03
2. "Got Your Money" (original version) – 4:03
3. "Rollin' wit You" (original version) – 3:56

== Charts ==
=== Weekly charts ===
Chart (1999–2000)	Peak position
Europe (Eurochart Hot 100)	45
France (SNEP)	82
Netherlands (Single Top 100)	96
Scottish Singles Sales (Official Charts)	18
UK Singles (Official Charts)	11
UK Hip Hop/R&B (Official Charts)	2
US Billboard Hot 100	33
US Hot R&B/Hip-Hop Songs (Billboard)	19
US Hot Rap Songs (Billboard)	6
US Rhythmic Airplay (Billboard)	4

=== Year-end charts ===
Chart (1999)	Position
US Rhythmic Top 40 (Billboard)	100

Chart (2000)	Position
UK Singles (OCC)	171
US Hot Rap Singles (Billboard)	24
US Rhythmic Top 40 (Billboard)	27

== Certifications ==
Region	Certification	Certified units/sales
New Zealand (RMNZ)	Platinum	30,000^{‡}
United Kingdom (BPI)	Gold	400,000^{‡}
^{‡} Sales+streaming figures based on certification alone.

== Release history ==
Region	Date	Format(s)	Label(s)	Ref(s).
United States	September 14, 1999	Rhythmic contemporary; urban radio	Elektra	
United States	February 1, 2000	CD	Elektra	
United Kingdom	June 26, 2000	12-inch vinyl; CD; cassette	Elektra	

== Other versions ==
In 2012, a parody of the song was made by ADHD called "Where You Hide Your Money" with 2012 Republican presidential nominee Mitt Romney as the subject of the song. Altered versions of the song appeared in 2013 television advertisements for Boost Mobile and a 2015 trailer for the film Get Hard. The song has also been sampled by the Chemical Brothers in their song "Galaxy Bounce".
