= David Guetta production discography =

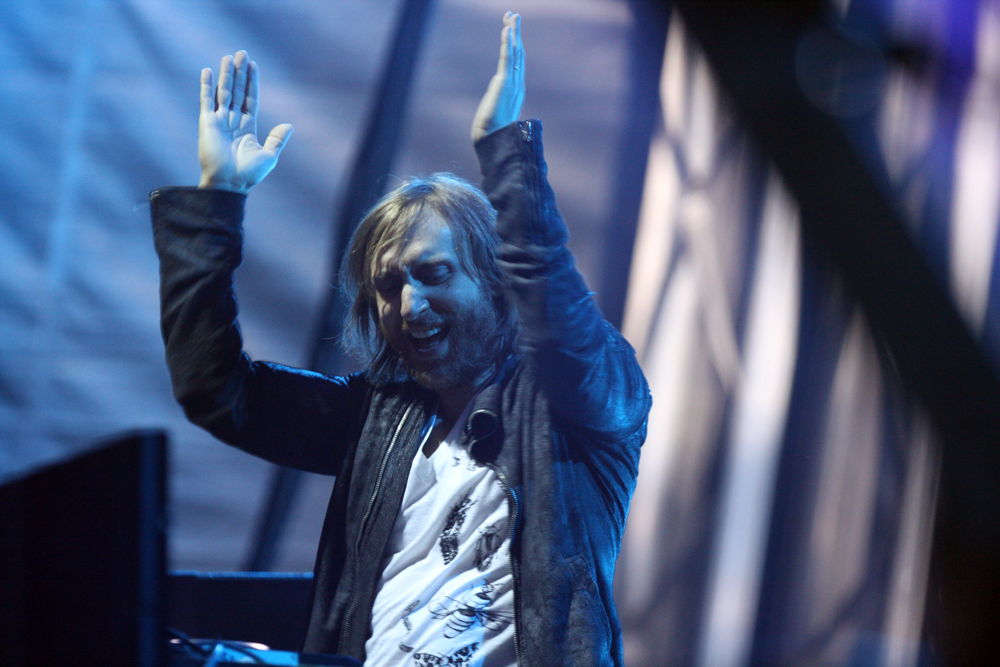
David Guetta in Sydney (2012)

The following is a list of tracks and remixes produced by French DJ and record producer David Guetta. Since the release of the album One Love (2009), Guetta has revealed his desire to produce singles for other artists.

== Songwriting and production credits ==
List of songs written and produced by David Guetta
Year	Title	Artist	Album	Notes
2009	"Rock That Body"	The Black Eyed Peas	The E.N.D.	co-produced with will.i.am, Mark Knight, Funkagenda
2009	"I Gotta Feeling"	The Black Eyed Peas	The E.N.D.	co-produced with Frédéric Riesterer
2010	"Acapella"	Kelis	Flesh Tone	
2010	"Scream"	Kelis	Flesh Tone	co-produced with Tocadisco
2010	"Angel"	Akon	Non-album single	
2010	"The Best One Yet (The Boy)"	The Black Eyed Peas	The Beginning	co-produced with will.i.am
2011	"Pass at Me" (feat. Pitbull)	Timbaland	Non-album single	co-produced with Timbaland
2011	"Something for the DJs"	Pitbull	Planet Pit	co-produced with Afrojack
2012	"Phresh Out the Runway"	Rihanna	Unapologetic	co-produced with The-Dream
2013	"Fashion!"	Lady Gaga	Artpop	co-produced with Lady Gaga, will.i.am and DJWS
2013	"It Should Be Easy" (featuring will.i.am)	Britney Spears	Britney Jean	co-produced with Giorgio Tuinfort, Nicky Romero, Marcus van Wattum, will.i.am and Anthony Preston
2013	"Body Ache"	Britney Spears	Britney Jean	co-produced with Giorgio Tuinfort, will.i.am and Anthony Preston
2013	"Til It's Gone"	Britney Spears	Britney Jean	
2013	"Now That I Found You"	Britney Spears	Britney Jean	
2014	"One Last Time"	Ariana Grande	My Everything	co-wrote with Giorgio Tuinfort, Rami Yacoub, Carl Falk and Ilya "Knocdown"
2015	"Who’s Taking You Home"	Ne-Yo	Non-Fiction	
2017	"Forever Is Over"	Elvana Gjata	Non-album single	
2017	"Pick Me Up" (featuring Anna of the North)	G-Eazy	The Beautiful & Damned	
2019	"Lying Down"	Celine Dion	Courage	
2020	"Polar"	MORTEN	Non-album single	
2020	"Lovesick Girls"	Blackpink	The Album	co-wrote with Teddy, 24, Løren, Jisoo, Jennie, Brian Lee, Leah Haywood, R. Tee, and Danny Chung
2021	"Summer Rain"	Majid Jordan	Wildest Dreams	

== Remixes ==
=== 2002 ===
- Kylie Minogue – "Love at First Sight" (Dancefloor Killa Mix)
- Cassius featuring Steve Edwards – "The Sound of Violence" (Dancefloor Killa Remix)

=== 2003 ===
- OMD – "Enola Gay" (Dancefloor Killa Remix)
- Geyster – "Bye Bye Superman" (Dancefloor Killa Remix)
- Saffron Hill – "My Love Is Always" (David Guetta Dancefloor Killa Vocal Mix)

=== 2005 ===
- Eurythmics – "I've Got a Life" (David Guetta & Joachim Garraud Remix)
- Africanism All Stars featuring Ben Onono – "Summer Moon" (F*** Me I'm Famous Mix)
- Culture Club – "Miss Me Blind" (F*** Me I'm Famous Remix)
- Deep Dish – "Flashdance" (Guetta & Garraud F*** Me I'm Famous Remix)
- Juliet – "Avalon" (F*** Me I'm Famous Remix)

=== 2006 ===
- Bob Sinclar featuring Steve Edwards – "World, Hold On (Children of the Sky)" (David Guetta & Joachim Garraud Remix)
- Benny Benassi – "Who's Your Daddy?" (David Guetta & Joachim Garraud Remix)
- Steve Bug – "At the Moment" (David Guetta Remix)

=== 2007 ===
- Kylie Minogue – "Wow" (Fuck Me I'm Famous Remix)
- David Guetta featuring Cozi – "Baby When the Light" (David Guetta & Fred Rister Remix)

=== 2008 ===
- Sharam featuring Daniel Bedingfield – "The One" (Joachim Garraud & David Guetta Remix)

=== 2009 ===
- The Black Eyed Peas – "Boom Boom Guetta" (David Guetta's Electro Hop Remix)
- The Black Eyed Peas – "I Gotta Feeling" (David Guetta's FMIF Remix)
- Calvin Harris – "Flashback" (David Guetta One Love Remix)
- David Guetta featuring Kid Cudi – "Memories" (Fuck Me I'm Famous Remix)
- Madonna – "Revolver" (Madonna vs. David Guetta One Love Remix) (Madonna vs. David Guetta One Love Version) [featuring Lil Wayne]

=== 2010 ===
- Kelis – "Acapella" (David Guetta Extended Mix)
- Kelly Rowland featuring David Guetta – "Commander" (David Guetta Remix)
- Robbie Rivera – "Rock the Disco" (David Guetta Laptop Remix)
- Flo Rida featuring David Guetta – "Club Can't Handle Me" (David Guetta FMIF Remix)
- David Guetta featuring Rihanna – "Who's That Chick?" (FMIF Remix)

=== 2012 ===
- David Guetta featuring Nicki Minaj – "Turn Me On" (David Guetta & Laidback Luke Remix)
- David Guetta featuring Chris Brown and Lil Wayne – "I Can Only Imagine" (David Guetta & Daddy's Groove Remix)
- Daddy's Groove – "Turn The Lights Down" (David Guetta Re Work)

=== 2013 ===
- Armin van Buuren featuring Trevor Guthrie – "This Is What It Feels Like" (David Guetta Remix)
- Empire of the Sun – "Alive" (David Guetta Remix)
- Passenger – "Let Her Go" (David Guetta Remix)

=== 2014 ===
- Avicii – "Addicted To You" (David Guetta Remix)
- Afrojack featuring Wrabel – "Ten Feet Tall" (David Guetta Remix)
- David Guetta featuring Sam Martin – "Dangerous" (David Guetta Banging Remix)

=== 2016 ===
- Fat Joe and Remy Ma featuring French Montana & Infrared – "All the Way Up" (David Guetta and GLOWINTHEDARK Remix)
- Steve Aoki featuring Rich The Kid & ILoveMakonnen – "How Else" (David Guetta Remix)

=== 2017 ===
- Charlie Puth – "Attention" (David Guetta Remix)

=== 2018 ===
- David Guetta & Sia – "Flames" (David Guetta Remix)
- MC Fioti, J Balvin & Stefflon Don – "Bum Bum Tam Tam" (David Guetta Remix)
- David Guetta featuring Anne-Marie – "Don't Leave Me Alone" (David Guetta Remix)
- Martin Garrix featuring Khalid – "Ocean" (David Guetta Remix)
- David Guetta featuring Chris Willis – "Just a Little More Love" (Jack Back 2018 Remix)
- Lenny Kravitz – "Low" (David Guetta Remix)
- Fred Rister featuring Sam Martin & Chris Willis – "I Want A Miracle" (David Guetta Remix)
- Calvin Harris & Sam Smith – "Promises" (David Guetta Remix)
- Black Coffee & David Guetta featuring Delilah Montagu – "Drive" (David Guetta Remix)

=== 2019 ===
- Bebe Rexha – "Last Hurrah" (David Guetta Remix)
- David Guetta featuring Raye – "Stay (Don't Go Away)" (David Guetta & R3HAB Remix)
- Avicii – "Heaven" (David Guetta & MORTEN Remix)
- David Guetta & Martin Solveig – "Thing for You" (David Guetta Remix)
- David Guetta & Martin Solveig – "Thing for You" (Jack Back Remix)

=== 2021 ===
- David Guetta feat Kid Cudi – "Memories" (2021 Remix)
- Jason Derulo feat Adam Levine – "Lifestyle" (David Guetta Slap House Mix)
- Bad Bunny and Jhay Cortez – "Dakiti" (David Guetta Remix)
- Becky Hill & David Guetta – "Remember" (David Guetta VIP Remix)
- Shouse – "Love Tonight" (David Guetta Remix)
- David Guetta feat Sia – "Titanium" (David Guetta & Morten Future Rave Mix)
- Farruko – "Pepas" (David Guetta Remix)
- Coldplay X BTS – "My Universe" (David Guetta Remix)

=== 2022 ===
- Kavinsky – "Cameo" (David Guetta Remix)
- Goya Menor and Nektunez - Ameno (David Guetta Remix)
- Megan Thee Stallion feat Dua Lipa - "Sweetest Pie" (David Guetta Remixes)
- Sam Smith & Kim Petras - "Unholy" (David Guetta Acid Remix)

=== 2023 ===
- Calvin Harris & Ellie Goulding - "Miracle" (David Guetta Remix)
- Kelly Clarkson - Favorite Kind Of High (David Guetta Remix)
- Britney Spears & will.i.am - "Mind Your Business" (David Guetta Remix)

=== 2024 ===
- Dennis Ferrer - "Hey Hey" (David Guetta & Jack Back Remix)
- U2 - "Atomic City" (David Guetta Remix)
- Mason & Princess Superstar - "Perfect (Exceeder)" (David Guetta Remix)
- Sophie Ellis-Bextor - "Murder on the Dancefloor" (David Guetta Remix)
- Shaboozey - "A Bar Song (Tipsy)" (David Guetta Remix)
- Girl on Couch & Billen Ted - "Man in Finance" (David Guetta Remix)
- Le Sserafim - "Crazy" (David Guetta Remix)

=== 2025 ===
- Jaden Bojsen & Sami Brielle - "Let's Go" (David Guetta Remix)
- Hypaton & Europe - "The Final Countdown 2025" (David Guetta Remix)
- Huntrix - "Golden" (David Guetta Remix)

== Unreleased tracks ==
- David Guetta, Afrojack and Avicii featuring Amanda Wilson - "Before I Could Say Goodbye" ^{[a]}

== Notes ==
- ^[a] The song was dubbed "Before I Could Say Goodbye" by fans but Guetta did not disclose a name for the song. The song was played at an Avicii tribute concert and was confirmed to be produced by Guetta, Afrojack and Avicii with vocals from British singer Amanda Wilson. At the time of the concert in 2019, Guetta said that the collaboration was previously unreleased and would likely not be released.
