= Pilotpriest discography =

- Studio albums: 3+
- EPs: 3+
- Singles: 8+

The following is the discography of Pilotpriest, including albums and singles. Pilotpriest is Anthony Scott Burns' DJ name. He has released a number of albums and EPs, as well as multiple singles and remixes. The 2010 single "4th of July (Fireworks)" by Kelis samples "You're My Heart (Pilotpriest Remix)" by Lioness, which was released in 2009.

== Discography ==
=== Albums ===
Albums by Pilotpriest
Year	Album title	Release details
2012	Original Motion Picture Soundtrack	Released: June 1, 2012; Format: Digital download
2012	Music From 1990 - 2000 A.D.	Released: Aug 12, 2012; Format: Digital download
2014	Darknet - Original Soundtrack Recording	Released: Jan 27, 2014; Format: Digital download
2015	W/W/D/K/F	Released: June 18, 2015; Format: Digital download
2016	Trans	Released: April 6, 2016; Format: Digital download
2021	EVINETTA	Released: January 2, 2021; Format: Digital download

=== EPs ===
EPs by Pilotpriest
Year	Album title	Release details
2014	The Bootleg Remixes 2007-2009	Released: Jun 8, 2014; Format: Digital download
2015	The Year Was 2006	Released: Jan 19, 2015; Format: Digital download
2019	THE BEAST	Released: Oct 29, 2019; Format: Digital download

=== Singles ===
Selected songs by Pilotpriest
Year	Title	Album	Release details
2010	"Thief"	Original Motion; Picture Soundtrack	Promo single (Dec 15, 2010)
2012	"Xanadu"	Original Motion; Picture Soundtrack	Music video (Jul 29, 2014)
2012	"Cosmosis"	Single only	Digital download (Jul 29, 2012)
2014	"Becoming"	Single only	Digital download (Apr 28, 2014)
2014	"Drunk Dial"	Single only	Digital download (Jun 8, 2014)
2014	"Archive Seven"	Single only	Digital download (June 25, 2014)
2014	"Shuffle Bored"	2 track single	Digital download (July 8, 2014)
2014	"The Last Goodbye"	Single only	Digital download (Aug 15, 2014)
2014	"Nighthawks"	Single only	Digital download (Sep 15, 2014)
2014	"Scherzo"	2 track single	Digital download (Sep 22, 2014)
2015	"KAMPUS"	Single only	Digital download (Jan 15, 2015)
2015	"Origin One"	Single only	Digital download (Mar 14, 2015)
2016	"SLASHER - Single"	Single only	Digital download (Sep 15, 2016)
2016	"LOST BOY"	2 track single	Digital download (Nov 16, 2016)
2017	"OUR FUNERAL"	Single only	Digital download (Jan 18, 2017)

=== Remixes ===
Selected remixes by Pilotpriest, with date of remix release
Year	Title	Album	Original artist	Release details
2009	"You're My Heart (Pilotpriest remix)"	Omens, Oracles & Signs – Vol. 1	Lioness	New Romantic Music (Apr 7, 2009)
2014	"My Adidas (Pilotpriest Remix)"	The Bootleg Remixes; 2007-2009	Run DMC	Digital download (Jun 8, 2014)
2014	"Boyz (Pilotpriest Remix)"	The Bootleg Remixes; 2007-2009	M.I.A.	Digital download (Jun 8, 2014)
2014	"Love Lockdown (1994 Pilotpriest Remix)"	The Bootleg Remixes; 2007-2009	Kanye West	Digital download (Jun 8, 2014)
