= Brave (Kelis song) =

Single by Kelis

from the album Flesh Tone
- Released: January 6, 2011
- Recorded: 2009
- Studio: Casa de Kelis (Los Angeles, California)
- Genre: EDM; electro house
- Length: 3:19
- Label: Interscope; will.i.am Music Group
- Songwriters: Kelis Rogers; William Adams; Jean Baptiste; James Fauntleroy
- Producers: Benny Benassi; Alle Benassi

Kelis singles chronology
| "Scream" (2010) | "Brave" (2011) | "Bounce" (2011) |

"Brave" is a song recorded by American recording artist Kelis for her fifth studio album, Flesh Tone (2010). She co-wrote the song with Jean Baptiste, James Fauntleroy, while production was handled by Benny Benassi, and his cousin Alle Benassi (known together as the Benassi Bros.). It premiered on January 6, 2011, by Will.i.am Music Group and Interscope Records as the fourth and final single from the album.

Musically, "Brave" is a mid-tempo disco song, influenced by heavy elements of electronic dance music. The song opens with a slow-pace, until it progresses with electronic dance music. Throughout the song, Kelis' vocals are heavily processed with autotune and vocoder post-production tools. Lyrically, the song is a self-empowerment anthem that discusses several phases of her personal life, including marriage/divorce, self-discovery, and the birth of her son.

The song received universal acclaim from critics, who praised its composition and production. Several critics highlighted the song as one of her most personal efforts, and selected it as an album standout. Despite this, "Brave" charted poorly in selected record charts. It reached number 29 on Belgium's Ultratip chart, and number 123 on the UK Singles Chart. It became Kelis' second single to chart outside the top 100 in the latter country, and is one of her worst performing singles there.

A music video was directed by British photographer Rankin, which was released online on November 19, 2010. The video features Kelis in front of a white background, with constant vibrations affecting the camera. "Brave" was performed exclusively at the Cherry Live Lounge, and was eventually included on her 2010 Vevo Summer Sets concert.

== Background and release ==
"Brave" was the final song recorded for the album. It was written by Kelis, with Jean Baptiste, James Fauntleroy, and Will.i.am, while production was handled by Benny Benassi, and his cousin Alle Benassi (known together as the Benassi Bros.); Will.i.am is the song's co-producer. This was Kelis' second collaboration with the Benassi Bros., the other being her track "Emancipate" from the single's parent album, Flesh Tone (2010). For the tracks instrumentation, Alain Whyte played the acoustic guitar, and the Benassi Bros. played the keyboards and synthesizers. In an interview with Kelis for the Vevo Webisodes of the album, she said that it was a "good choice to record it as the last song, because its kind of a nice resolution," of several emotions she was feeling whilst recording the album. It was selected as the fourth and final single from Flesh Tone, and was released on January 6, 2011, by Will.i.am Music Group and Interscope Records. It served as the third single in the United States, following "Acapella" and "4th of July (Fireworks)".

The promotional CD only contains the single. It was released in the United Kingdom as a promotional single only. A digital extended play (EP) was released on January 9 that same year, including the single, plus remixes of the track by Arveene & Misk, Marc Spence, Gemini, Dark Sky, and Third Party. The CD and digital cover sleeve has a portrait of Kelis, photographed by British photographer Rankin. She is seen holding down the collar of her shirt. "Brave" is featured in the PC Game The Sims 3: Late Night, re-recorded in the game's fictional language of Simlish.

== Composition ==
"Brave" was recorded in 2010 at Casa de Kelis studios in Los Angeles, California. Robert Orton mixed the track, whilst Ryan Buendia recorded it. Orton had arranged and edited the vocoder and autotune post-production tools. Kelis' edited vocals are delivered during the first verse, between 30 and 34 seconds of the song. Musically, "Brave" is a mid-tempo disco song, influenced by heavy elements of electronic dance music. NME editor Gavin Haynes labelled it a dance track that incorporated " DFA1979 distorted crash cymbals". Alex Young from Consequence of Sound noted elements of tribal house and 1970s music, "that reinforces some of the good impact nostalgia has on today's musical landscape". Writing for BBC Music, Sarah Bee said it was the most "Madonna-esque track here". Writing for the online music blog MuuMuse, Bradley Stern said that the song "finds Kelis taking on her divorce, pregnancy, and various other inner demons in a rave-happy, carnal explosion of noisy synthesizers and grinding electronica." Ken Capobianco from The Boston Globe identified elements of eurodisco in the songs' compositions. A reviewer from Urb.com believed that, although the track was influenced by electronic music, it "isn't forced or calculated".

"Brave"
A 30-second sample of "Brave". Musically, "Brave" is a mid-tempo disco song, influenced by heavy electronic dance music. Lyrically, the song is a self-empowerment anthem, discussing several aspects of Kelis' personal life.

Lyrically, the song is a self-empowerment anthem, discussing several aspects of Kelis' personal life. One of the first themes is her marriage and divorce to American rapper Nas. In an interview with Us Weekly, Kelis' said about the song's "therapeutic" delivery; "After the split, everyone was like 'You are going through a rough time, you should write something personal.' I wear my feelings on my sleeve. The hardest decisions are the best ones and for me that was really the case..." The lyrics "I'm not ashamed of winning / but it wasn't that way in the beginning," "tells her side of the story in her divorce from her husband..." She references the word "Braveheart" in the lyrics, which is a recording group formed by her ex-husband Nas and his brother. Another lyrical theme is self-discovery, exemplified throughout the chorus section. The third and final aspect, as analysed by music critics, is the birth and living of Kelis' and Nas' son, Knight. Bee found that the discussion of her son was the most "explicit" element to the song. Writing for The Village Voice, Jessica Hopper stated "In recent interviews, Kelis has insisted that she returned to the studio and made Flesh Tone to support herself and her son. That determination is significant—and audible—throughout. On 'Brave,' she credits her baby for saving her."

The song starts with soft electronic music, until it progresses by the second verse. According to ABC News blogger Allan Riable, he analysed the song; "An electronic effect is evident on her voice, but it's subtle enough not to draw attention away from the track's focus. Such an effect is more of a sonic decoration than a vocal fix." During the third chorus, the electronic synths are replaced with an acoustic guitar. During this section, Kelis' vocals are not edited with autotune or vocoder. The final chorus goes back to electronic music, and it ends with an interlude track that leads directly into the following album track, "Song for the Baby". The interlude track is included on the iTunes Store version of Flesh Tone.

== Critical response ==
The song received universal acclaim from most music critics. Sal Cinquemani from Slant Magazine had highlighted the "clever" lines and hooks in the song. Writing for BBC Music, Sarah Bee positively said that Kelis' "husky" vocals and "explicit" songwriting were highlights to songs like "Brave". Caroline Sullivan from The Guardian highlighted the song as one of the best tracks from the album; she labelled its production, lyrical, and vocal deliveries as "striking". Similarly, Los Angeles Times writer Margaret Wappler felt "Brave" was one of the album tracks that demonstrated a "new niche for Kelis". A reviewer from Art Nouveau magazine also highlighted the song as one of the best tracks from the album. Dan Paridalis from 411Mania felt it was one of the better tracks from the album that delivered "revealing" lyrics.

Bradley Stern from MuuMuse selected the song as the best track, labelling it a "true triumph". He stated, "An immediate favorite from the get-go, 'Brave' is truly what brings Flesh Tone from greatness to the upper echelons of incredible." Similarly, Talia Soghomonian from MusicOMH felt that "Brave" was one of the "paramount moments on the album with its sharp synths and fuzzy electronics". Allan Riable, writing for the ABC News blog, reviewed the album track "Emancipate" as an "unfortunate weak spot". In follow-up, he reviewed "Brave", the following track on the album, and said it "works better, returning her to more of an electro-clash realm." He also commended its "acoustic section". Writing for Ur Chicago Magazine, Neil Miller Jr. also believed it was the album's "stand out" moment.

== Commercial performance ==
Commercially, the single underperformed in selected record charts. In the Flemish region of Belgium, it debuted at number 48 on their Ultratip chart during the week of February 12, 2011. The following week of February 19, it reached number 38, and rose again to number 31 in its third week of February 26. It reached its final peak position of number 29, during the charting week of March 5. It was its last charting week before falling out completely. It debuted at number 48 on their Ultratop Dance Singles Chart during the week of February 12, 2011. After seven weeks in that chart, it reached its final peak position of number 31 during the week of April 2. The song lasted 10 weeks in the chart, with a final charting position at number 39.

== Music video and reception ==
A music video, directed by Rankin, for the single was uploaded to YouTube on November 19, 2010. The video shows a still camera of Kelis, wearing a white top with a white background behind her. Throughout the entire video, the camera shots jitter and move in different directions. Overall, the music video received positive reviews from music critics. An author of Homorazzi.com was positive towards the music video; He said, "Instead of all the special effects, colors, and futuristic feel, she went simple. Very, very simple." He carried on saying, "He's a smart guy and definitely knows how to make her look good... The style certainly matches the personal lyrics that come from Kelis on this track..." A reviewer from Rap-Up labelled the visuals as "minimalistic". In an extended review of the single's music video, Idolator staff member's said;

"Kelis looks stunning, wearing white against white, with a classy blonde ‘do and bright red lipstick that provides a splash of color in this otherwise muted video. Surely not every performer could get away with doing one long unbroken take for a whole video, but Kelis owns every frame with her emotive delivery and a sense of gravitas —she's able to command the screen with just her emotive expressions and minimal movement. The shot remains fixed on her, though Kelis and Rankin do shake things up a bit by having the camera pulse to the beat — a nifty effect that livens up the video just enough... This video is just Kelis, and she owns it. True to the song's title, this less-is-more approach was courageous, and "Brave" delivers."

However, a reviewer from That Grape Juice online was particularly negative towards the video in their review. The writer felt it was "underwhelming" by saying, "this concept-based clip was somewhat pre-disposed to underwhelming me. This only heightened by the fact that, believe it or not, the London based shoot was very expensive – hence in reality could have seen more effort put into it creatively." Although the writer felt the close-ups were "boring", they praised Kelis' look in the visual. The reviewer opened a poll whether the song's music video was good or bad; 65.93% of the votes felt it was good, whilst 34.07% voted otherwise.

== Live performances ==
The song has been included on several concert performances by Kelis. In promotion of Flesh Tone, she performed "Brave", alongside several other album tracks, at a concert in London, England in May 2010. During her All Hearts Tour, a collaborative concert tour with Swedish recording artist Robyn, she performed the single at Music Box Theatre on July 23, 2010. She performed the song again at the September 2010 Vevo Summer Set concert. Through the performance, Kelis wore a glittery wig and a silver mini-skirt. Three days after the single's release, she sang an acoustic version of the track at the Cherrytree Live Lounge. She performed the song at the annual 2011 Demo Fest at the Kastel Fortress in Banja Luka, the second largest city in Bosnia and Herzegovina. She performed the track at the Bristol Gay Pride event in 2011.

== Track listings and formats ==
- Promotional CD
1. "Brave" – 3:33
- Digital download
1. "Brave" (Arveene & Misk Remix) – 4:03
2. "Brave" (Marc Spence Remix) – 5:53
3. "Brave" (Gemini Remix) – 4:54
4. "Brave" (Dark Sky Remix) – 5:20
5. "Brave" (Third Party Remix) – 7:16

== Credits and personnel ==
Credits adapted from the liner notes of the Flesh Tone album.

- Kelis – vocals, background vocals, songwriting
- Jean Baptiste – songwriting
- James Fauntleroy – songwriting
- Will.i.am – songwriting, co-producing
- Benny Benassi – composition, producing, keyboards, synthesizers
- Alle Benassi – composition, producing, keyboards, synthesizers
- Robert Orton – mixing
- Ryan Buendia – recording
- Alain Whyte – acoustic guitar
- Recorded at Casa de Kelis studios in Los Angeles, California (2010).

== Charts ==
| Chart (2011) | Peak position |
|---|---|
| Belgium (Ultratip Flanders) | 29 |
| Belgium Dance Singles (Ultratop Flanders) | 31 |
| US Dance/Electronic Digital Song Sales (Billboard) | 29 |

== Release history ==
| Region | Date | Format | Label |
|---|---|---|---|
| United Kingdom | 6 January 2011 | Digital download, digital remixes EP | will.i.am music / Interscope Records |
