= Lioness (EP) =

Lioness EP

EP by Lioness
- Released: October 21, 2008
- Recorded: Signal to Noise
- Genre: Indie rock, dance-punk
- Length: 17:18
- Label: New Romantic Music
- Producer: Rob Sanzo, Lioness

Lioness chronology
Lioness EP (2008)	Omens, Oracles & Signs - Vol. 1 (2009)

Professional ratings
Review scores
Source	Rating
Eye Weekly October 15, 2008	3/5 stars
Exclaim! October 21, 2008	N/A
Vue Weekly October 16, 2008^{[usurped]}	N/A

Lioness is the self-titled EP and first release from Canadian indie rock band Lioness. It was released on October 21, 2008 in Canada by New Romantic Music.

== Track listing ==
All tracks are written by Lioness (Fischer/Morris/Scheven)

No.	Title	Length
1.	"You're My Heart"	4:30
2.	"Harder They Fall"	3:05
3.	"Dark Matter"	1:33
4.	"Haunted Magick"	4:32
5.	"What You Do (Will Come Back to You)"	3:38

== Personnel ==
- Vanessa Fischer – vocals
- Ronnie Morris – bass
- Jeff Scheven – drums, electronica
