= Flesh Tone =

Studio album by Kelis
- Released: May 14, 2010
- Recorded: 2009–2010
- Genres: Electronic dance; dance-pop; electropop
- Length: 37:37
- Labels: will.i.am; Interscope
- Producers: Alle Benassi; Benny Benassi; Boys Noize; Burns; Damien LeRoy aka DJ Ammo; El Tocadisco (Roman de Garcez); Free School; David Guetta; Printz Board; Fred Riesterer; will.i.am

Kelis chronology
The Hits (2008)	Flesh Tone (2010)	Food (2014)

Singles from Flesh Tone
- 1. "Acapella" Released: February 20, 2010; 2. "4th of July (Fireworks)" Released: June 8, 2010; 3. "Scream" Released: October 7, 2010; 4. "Brave" Released: January 6, 2011

Flesh Tone is the fifth studio album by American singer Kelis, released on May 14, 2010, by the will.i.am Music Group and Interscope Records. Recorded while the singer was unsigned and pregnant with her first child, the album is an ode to motherhood and marks a distinct departure from the R&B sound of her previous albums. The album features production from David Guetta, Boys Noize, Jean Baptiste, and Benny Benassi, amongst others.

Flesh Tone is an electronic dance, dance-pop, and electropop album that incorporates elements of house, synth-pop, and dancehall. The record serves as Kelis' debut with Interscope Records under the will.i.am Music Group. Contemporary music critics praised the album for being cohesive as well as refreshing and lean. Flesh Tone spawned four singles, including "Acapella" and "4th of July (Fireworks)", which were successful on the US Hot Dance Club Songs chart and the UK Dance Singles Chart.

== Background ==
In October 2007, Kelis parted ways with Jive Records due to the lackluster commercial response of her fourth studio album, Kelis Was Here, in the United States. Kelis was signed to Pharrell Williams' record label Star Trak, which was originally distributed by Virgin Records, but after it was bought by Arista Records, she was moved to Jive Records. Her manager Jeff Rhaban explained, "It was a case of being in the ever-shrinking world of the record industry and finding herself on a label she wasn't signed to and without a champion". Two years later, Kelis began working on a new album as an unsigned artist. She recorded much of the songs in the garage of her Los Angeles home, named Casa de Kelis, while finishing touches were added at Jeepney Studios. Soon after parting ways with Jive, it was reported that Kelis had been working on an indie dance album with Cee-Lo.

On December 1, 2009, it was confirmed that Kelis had signed to Interscope Records through the will.i.am Music Group, and that her then-untitled fifth studio album featured production from will.i.am, Free School, Boys Noize, Burns, DJ Ammo, and David Guetta. She played the album to a few record labels before choosing will.i.am's label. "I think that he's brilliant", Kelis said of will.i.am. "As far as this generation goes, there's not a single song that you can bring up to him or a reference or an artist or an era of music that he is not privy to or that he doesn't understand. [...] He's not afraid to push the limits and kinda go further than everyone else and that's exciting. He still seems to be having fun doing it and that's what it's all about." In response, will.i.am said, "Kelis represents the kind of edge that pushes all of us not just musically but stylistically as well. She has always opened new doors for her audience and we're ready to walk through this next one with her."

According to Billboard, which ran a preview of Flesh Tone in January 2010, the album would consist of eight songs, although Kelis would later confirm that the final mastered version of the album actually contained nine songs. The preview also detailed individual songs: "Acapella", helmed by David Guetta, is a tribute to her son; "4th of July", which was produced by DJ Ammo; "Kids", which is inspired by gay clubgoers; and "Carefree American", an acoustic-guitar driven number. She also entered the studio with label head will.i.am to produce recordings for the album; according to a press release, one of his tracks was set to appear on the album. Guetta also contributed another song, "Scream", to the album. It was also reported that the singer had worked with English synth-pop duo La Roux. The songs "Alive" (produced by Diplo) and "Carefree American" (produced by Jean Baptiste) are not included on the standard pressings of the album. Additionally, the iTunes Store confirmed that the album contains segues. On March 11, 2010, it was revealed that Kelis was working with British fashion photographer Rankin, who helped fellow British director Chris Cottam to produce the video for the album's lead single "Acapella", as well as helming the photoshoot for the album's imagery and cover.

== Composition ==
Flesh Tone is an electronic dance, dance-pop, and electropop album.

The album opens with "Intro", which has an electro-funk production and bears resemblance to some of David Bowie's early work. "Scream" has elements of electro-rap, house, and electroclash, and its production contains a "blade of blues melody [that] slices in atop a rinky-dink sampled piano". It also has "lots of sonic confusingness" as the "song evaporates in the middle ... then reassembles and feeds into a staccato spoken-word electroclash midsection." Several critics stated how the song has split sections, sometimes like "a beat-free beach house piano-based meditation" whilst at other times, sounding like "haughty electroclash ingenue". The verses are mainly house music while the choruses are electronica and have rap music stylings. "Acapella" is about being "swept up in a new love, and transformed by the giddy thrill to such a degree that everything that happened before seems drab and gray by comparison". The track was compared to Donna Summer and "her astonishing synth-disco amazingness from the '70s".

== Singles ==
"Acapella" was released on February 23, 2010, as the lead single from Flesh Tone. The song topped the US Hot Dance Club Songs chart and the UK Dance Singles Chart, while reaching number five on the UK Singles Chart and number 17 on the Irish Singles Chart. The album's second single, "4th of July (Fireworks)", was released in the US on June 8, 2010, and in the UK on July 4. It peaked at number four on the US Hot Dance Club Songs chart, number six on the UK Dance Singles Chart, and number 32 on the UK Singles Chart.

"Scream" was released as the third single from the album on October 7, 2010, coinciding with the European leg of Kelis' All Hearts Tour. The single peaked at number 168 on the UK Singles Chart. "Brave" was released as the album's fourth and final single on January 6, 2011. Kelis also re-recorded the track in Simlish for the 2010 video game The Sims 3: Late Night.

== Promotion ==
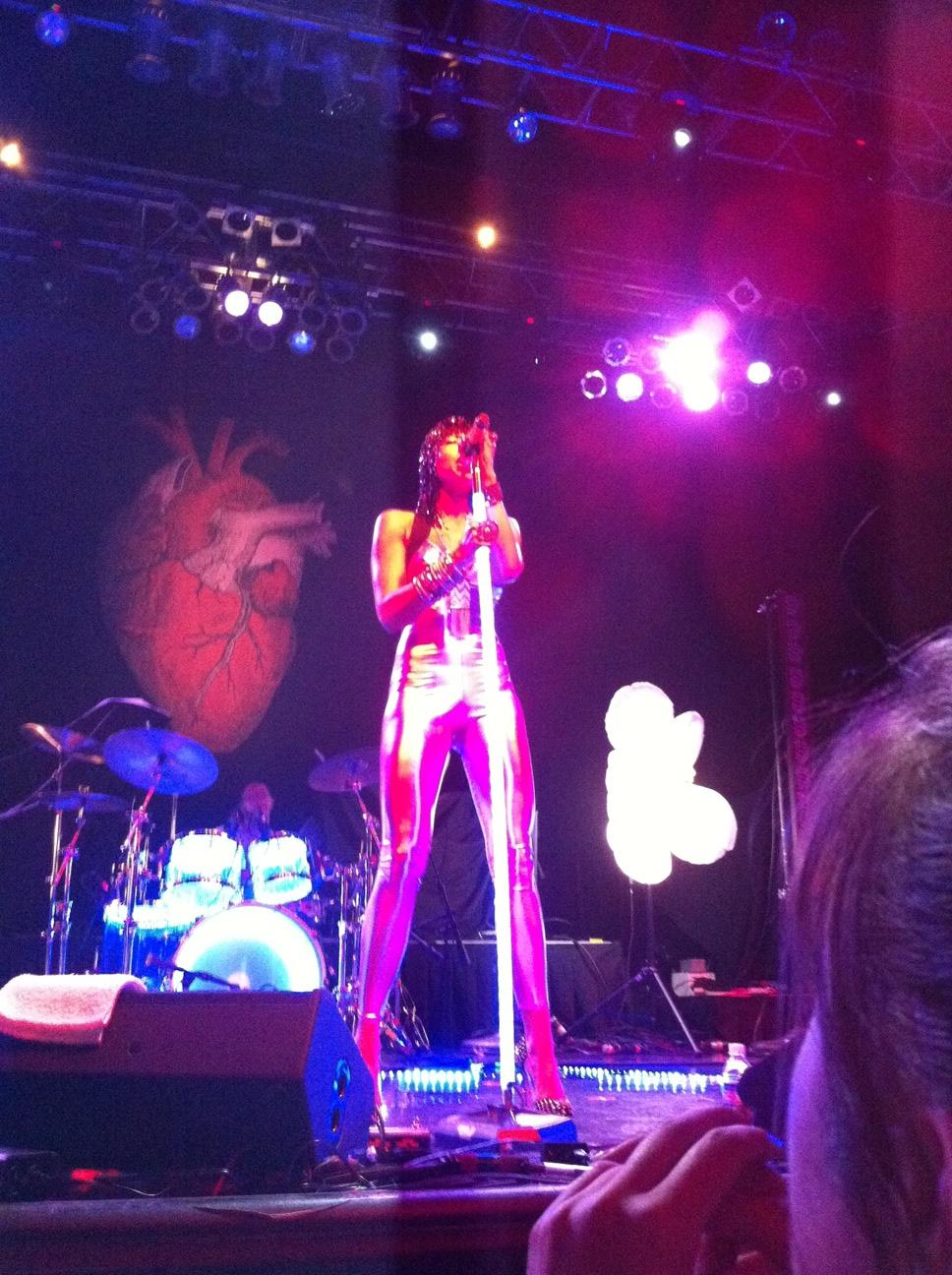
Kelis performing in July 2010 during her tour with Robyn

On February 26, 2010, Kelis officially premiered the lead single "Acapella" at Eva Longoria's Las Vegas nightclub Eve, where she also performed three songs from the album. The promotional tour for the album kicked off on March 27, 2010, with an appearance at the Ultra Music Festival during the Winter Music Conference in Miami, where she performed "Acapella" and "Spaceship"; the latter is a collaboration with Benny Benassi and apl.de.ap for Benassi's album Electroman. Additionally, she performed "Acapella" for the first time on live television on Jimmy Kimmel Live! on April 6, 2010. In the United Kingdom, Kelis promoted the album on GMTV, Later... with Jools Holland, BBC Radio 1's Live Lounge and debuted "4th of July (Fireworks)" as a single on T4. She also performed at Isle of MTV Malta Special on June 30.

On June 18, 2010, Kelis performed "4th of July (Fireworks)" on The Tonight Show with Jay Leno and The Tavis Smiley Show. She performed on The Today Show and 106 & Park on July 6, as well as on Late Night with Jimmy Fallon on July 13. Kelis was honored and performed at Elle magazine's "Women in Music" event at the Highline Ballroom in New York City on June 9, 2010. On May 20, 2010, Kelis announced via Twitter that she would be co-headlining a tour with Swedish singer Robyn across the US called the All Hearts Tour, which began on July 23 at The Music Box in Los Angeles and concluded on August 5 at Webster Hall in New York City.

== Critical reception ==
Professional ratings
Aggregate scores
Source	Rating
AnyDecentMusic?	6.4/10
Metacritic	77/100
Review scores
Source	Rating
AllMusic	4/5 stars
Entertainment Weekly	B+
The Guardian	4/5 stars
Los Angeles Times	3/4 stars
NME	8/10
Pitchfork	7.2/10
Rolling Stone	3/5 stars
Slant Magazine	3/5 stars
Spin	8/10
Tom Hull – on the Web	B+

Flesh Tone received generally positive reviews from music critics. At Metacritic, which assigns a normalized rating out of 100 to reviews from mainstream publications, the album received an average score of 77, based on 16 reviews. AllMusic writer Andy Kellman stated that "Flesh Tone is a headlong dive into sleek dance-pop ... [yet] it is much more personal than any of her past releases", concluding that the album "remains a stylistic outlier, the disc will always be a bright standout in Kelis' discography." Caroline Sullivan of The Guardian shared a similar sentiment and wrote, "As with her previous records, her fifth studio album doesn't sound like anyone else – [it's] stamped with her unique take on things. Flesh Tone may break no new musical ground, but it's very good." Spin's Jessica Hopper wrote that Kelis "goes full-tilt house diva" and commended her "husky-voiced, Oprah-esque survivor aphorisms". Sarah Bee of BBC Online called it a "sensual and exhilarating album" and praised Kelis's performance, stating "Kelis has always been a strong character and a brave musician – this is what carries the album and assures your ears that it's no out-of-element flounder ... [Her] honey-husky voice slips easily into the hypnotic repetitions of dance music vocalisation." Digital Spy's Nick Levine stated that "Flesh Tone grabs your attention straight away and refuses to let go ... [she] has reinvented herself as a Europoppy dance diva ... It works, and it works wonderfully, because she's committed herself unequivocally [to] a ballad-free, constantly-throbbing bop-til-you-drop dance record joined together by some intriguing segue pieces. [It's a] terrific club-pop record on a humongous high - and an all-natural one at that."

However, some critics viewed the album's sound as unoriginal and dated. Johnny Dee of Virgin Media said "Flesh Tone marks a thrilling comeback ... The only complaint is that at 9 tracks it feels a little light." Slant Magazine's Sal Cinquemani was more critical of Kelis' direction towards dance music, stating that the album "sounds dated in the worst kind of way—that is, not enough to sound retro-cool, but enough to sound totally uncool. It helps that the album ... segued together with interludes that are more interesting than the actual songs. Flesh Tone should sound desperate, but it often sounds inspired instead. Kelis seems electrified by her new genre shift, and the result is an album that's one of her most consistent to date." Kaya Burgess of The Times pointed out that "Acapella" and "Home" are the only tracks that "stand out from an otherwise rather copy-and-paste collection of electronic numbers". Magaret Wappler of the Los Angeles Times expressed that Kelis has managed to "make a spirited but disciplined set of classic Euro-club bangers. Sometimes they're darkly contemplative, slipping into trance; other times they nearly rip at the seams ... it's clear that Kelis has carved out a new niche for herself, dancing in front of the turntables till the lights come on, if they dare." Sam Richards of Uncut complimented its fusion of "R&B sass to thumping club beats" and stated "most everything Kelis touches drips with class". Gavin Haynes of NME felt that "Flesh Tone has already filled out an application form for pop record of the year" and stated, "Her ability to appear unimpeachably cool hasn't wavered either. But these are as nothing. What's important here is simply her direction: a genuinely innovative bearing that breaks new ground for pop without sounding any less pop for it. Kelis. Genius. Pop auteur."

The album was placed at number 53 on NME's list of the 75 Best Albums of 2010.

== Commercial performance ==
Flesh Tone debuted at number 48 on the US Billboard 200, selling 7,800 copies in its first week.

== Track listing ==
Flesh Tone track listing
No.	Title	Writer(s)	Producer(s)	Length
1.	"Intro"	Kelis; Burns; Jean Baptiste	Burns	3:29
2.	"22nd Century"	Kelis; Baptiste; Alex Ridha; Andreas Meid; Ian O'Brien-Docker	Boys Noize	4:54
3.	"4th of July (Fireworks)"	Kelis; Baptiste; Damien LeRoy; Jamie Munson; Anthony Burns; Vanessa Fischer; Ronald Morris; Jeff Scheven	Damien LeRoy aka DJ Ammo	5:39
4.	"Home"	Kelis; Baptiste; Nick Marsh	Free School	4:02
5.	"Acapella"	Kelis; David Guetta; Fred Riesterer; Baptiste; Makeba Riddick	Guetta; Riesterer^{[a]}	4:27
6.	"Scream"	Kelis; Guetta; Baptiste; El Tocadisco	Guetta; El Tocadisco (Roman de Garcez)^{[a]}	3:29
7.	"Emancipate"	Kelis; Baptiste; Benny Benassi; Alle Benassi	A. Benassi; B. Benassi	4:25
8.	"Brave"	Kelis; James Fauntleroy; will.i.am; Baptiste	A. Benassi; B. Benassi; will.i.am^{[a]}	3:31
9.	"Song for the Baby"	Kelis; Baptiste; Michael McHenry; Printz Board	Free School	3:41
Total length:				37:37

Japanese edition bonus track / iTunes Store UK pre-order bonus track
No.	Title	Writer(s)	Producer(s)	Length
10.	"Acapella" (Benny Benassi Remix)	Kelis; Guetta; Riesterer; Baptiste; Riddick	Guetta; Riesterer^{[a]}; B. Benassi^{[b]}	6:19
Total length:				43:56

iTunes Store US bonus track
No.	Title	Writer(s)	Producer(s)	Length
10.	"Carefree American"	Kelis; Baptiste; Cathy Dennis; McHenry; Alain Whyte	Free School	3:09
Total length:				40:46

=== Notes ===
- ^{^[a]} signifies a co-producer
- ^{^[b]} signifies a remixer
- All segues produced and performed by Free School.

=== Sample credits ===
- "4th of July (Fireworks)" samples "You're My Heart (Pilotpriest Remix)" by Lioness.

== Personnel ==
Credits adapted from the liner notes of Flesh Tone.

=== Musicians ===
- Kelis – vocals
- Burns – all instruments (track 1)
- Boys Noize – all instruments (track 2)
- Jean Baptiste – background vocals (tracks 2, 7)
- Stacy Barthe – background vocals (track 2)
- Sylvia Gordon – background vocals (track 2)
- Damien LeRoy aka DJ Ammo – instruments (track 3)
- Nick Marsh – instruments (track 4)
- Sylvia Black – background vocals (tracks 4, 7)
- Michael McHenry – background vocals (track 4); all other instruments (track 9)
- Neil Jacobson – background vocals (tracks 6, 7)
- Benny Benassi – instruments (track 7)
- Alle Benassi – background vocals (track 7)
- George Robertson – background vocals (track 7)
- DJ Rashida – background vocals (track 7)
- Nick J. Groff – background vocals (track 7)
- Alain Whyte – guitar (track 8)
- Printz Board – flugelhorn (track 9)

=== Technical ===
- Burns – production (track 1)
- Michael McHenry – recording (track 1)
- Dylan "3D" Dresdow – mixing (tracks 1, 3, 9)
- Boys Noize – production (track 2)
- Ryan Buendia (DJ Replay) – recording (tracks 2, 6, 8); associate executive production
- Robert Orton – mixing (tracks 2, 4, 8)
- Damien LeRoy aka DJ Ammo – production (track 3)
- Brian "B Russ" – recording (tracks 3, 5, 9)
- Free School – production (tracks 4, 9); segues production, co-executive production
- Renato "Nato" Lopez – recording (tracks 4, 7)
- David Guetta – production, mixing (tracks 5, 6)
- Fred Riesterer – co-production (track 5)
- El Tocadisco (Roman de Garcez) – co-production (track 6)
- Alle Benassi – production (tracks 7, 8); mixing (track 7)
- Benny Benassi – production (tracks 7, 8)
- will.i.am – co-production (track 8); co-executive production
- Gene Grimaldi – mastering
- Kelis – executive production
- Mark Gillespie – associate executive production
- Cliff Feiman – production supervision

=== Artwork ===
- Rankin – photography
- Nelly Recchia – body art painting
- Kenn Brown – body illustration
- Mogollon – art direction

== Charts ==
Chart performance for Flesh Tone
Chart (2010)	Peak position
Australian Charts (ARIA)	162
Belgian Albums (Ultratop Flanders)	64
Dutch Albums (Album Top 100)	81
French Albums (SNEP)	132
German Albums (Offizielle Top 100)	61
Greek International Albums (IFPI)	12
Irish Albums (IRMA)	54
Scottish Albums (Official Charts)	59
Swiss Albums (Schweizer Hitparade)	49
UK Albums (Official Charts)	46
UK R&B Albums (Official Charts)	6
US Billboard 200	48
US Top Dance Albums (Billboard)	5

== Release history ==
Release history for Flesh Tone
Region	Date	Label	Ref.
Poland	May 14, 2010	Universal	
France	May 17, 2010	Universal	
United Kingdom	May 17, 2010	Polydor	
Japan	May 19, 2010	Universal	
Germany	May 28, 2010	Universal	
Canada	July 6, 2010	Universal	
United States	July 6, 2010	will.i.am; Interscope	
Australia	July 9, 2010	Universal	
