= Megan Boni =

American singer and social media personality (born 1997)

- Born: May 16, 1997 (age 29); Bryn Mawr, Pennsylvania, US
- Other name: Girl on Couch
- Occupation: Social media personality

TikTok information
- Page: Girl On Couch
- Years active: 2020—present
- Followers: 330 thousand
- Last updated: 2025

Megan Boni (born May 16, 1997), known online as Girl on Couch, is an American social media personality. She is known for her song "Looking for a Man in Finance", which went viral on TikTok in 2024.

== Life and career ==
Megan Boni was born on May 16, 1997 in Bryn Mawr, Pennsylvania. She attended Harriton High School and graduated from Pennsylvania State University in 2019 with a degree in communications, moving to New York City shortly thereafter. She received her Master of Business Administration (MBA) from Temple University in 2024, by which point she was based in Chelsea.

In March 2020, Boni joined the social media app TikTok under the name Girl on Couch, based on her often using the app on her couch, where she started uploading comedy videos set to trending songs on the platform. Until 2024, Boni worked in sales for the sports apparel manufacturer Outerstuff. In April 2024, she posted a 19-second-long clip of a satirical song she wrote about women unsatisfied with being single but who had a long list of unrealistic dating standards, including being 6 feet 5 inches (1.96 m) tall and having a trust fund, asking in its caption for someone to make it into an "actual song". It soon went viral and received more than 50 million views by June of that year. The song was parodied on the app and remixes of the song by numerous record producers, including songwriting duo Billen Ted and French DJ David Guetta, were compiled and released in June 2024 as a single, "Looking for a Man in Finance". She soon signed a distribution and licensing deal with Capitol Records for the song and quit her job at Outerstuff due to the success of the song, which charted in Germany, Ireland, New Zealand, Poland, Sweden, Switzerland, and the United States. By June 2024, she had accrued more than 250 thousand followers on TikTok.

== Discography ==
=== Singles ===
List of singles, with selected chart positions
Title	Year	Peak chart positions							Album
Title	Year	US Dance	NZ Hot	SWE Heat	GER	IRE	POL Top 100	SWI	Album
"Looking for a Man in Finance"	2024	41	28	1	83	84	36	64	Non-album singles
"Let's Connect (After Coachella)"	2026	—	—	—	—	—	—	—	Non-album singles
"—" denotes a recording that did not chart or was not released.
