= Acapella (Kelis song) =

Single by Kelis

from the album Flesh Tone
- Released: February 20, 2010
- Genre: Electro house
- Length: 4:08; 6:56 (extended mix)
- Label: will.i.am; Interscope
- Songwriters: Kelis Rogers; David Guetta; Fred Riesterer; Jean Baptiste; Makeba Riddick
- Producer: David Guetta

Kelis singles chronology
"Lil Star" (2007)	"Acapella" (2010)	"4th of July (Fireworks)" (2010)

"Acapella" is a song by American singer Kelis from her fifth studio album, Flesh Tone (2010). The song is a departure from her past singles in that it is a dance/electronic track rather than hip hop/R&B-oriented. The song was first premiered on her Twitter page and her official website in November 2009, and was released on February 23, 2010, as the lead single from the album.

The song's co-writer Makeba Riddick revealed that the song had previously been called "Majestic". Kelis stated that she wrote the song "with love and life in my mind" and as a tribute to her son, Knight. It has received positive reviews from critics many of whom praise the song for its inspirational lyrics and for its uptempo feel-good vibe which includes angelic harmonies. The song was listed at number 20 on the NME's best tracks of 2010; they described it as "her most thrilling tune since 'Milkshake'".

== Reception ==
The single received universally positive reviews. Pitchfork Media gave the song a positive review, rating the track an 8 [out of a possible 10] and saying: "'Acapella' is a smooth, Donna Summer-style track with Kelis as an icy electro queen, a robotic embrace of house's metronomic bliss." About.com's "Dance Music" section reviewed the track favorably, calling the song "majestic" and named it its "Song of the Day". Entertainment Weekly called the song a "feathery dance-floor delight" and placed the song on its "The MustList" for 2010 whilst Billboard magazine added the song to its 2010's "Best Bits" listing. NME magazine also loved the song calling it "the most thrilling tune since "Milkshake" whilst Heat said the "banger" deserves four stars.

Nick Levine of Digital Spy was more than impressed by the song. He said "Will.i.am's been a busy boy lately, but what's the best thing he's done for us – the new Usher single ['OMG']? Nah. 'Meet Me Halfway'? Hmm... maybe. Signing Kelis... Bingo! We say this because 'Acapella' is quite possibly the most sublime slice of club pop we'll hear all year. Over tub-thumping beats ... Kelis delivers a heartfelt tribute to her baby son, Knight. 'Before you my whole life was acapella', she gushes on the near-hymnal chorus, 'Now a symphony is the only song to sing'. The result is so uplifting, so full of energy and emotion, it doesn't just make you want to dance – it makes you want to dance with everyone who's a little bit special to you." Fraser McAlpine of BBC Chart Blog was also gushing with praise for the song, saying it is "a song which is itself so sparkling and loveable as to make other pop songs seem un-inspired and un-glorious, even the really good ones. [The] melody has been launched from a throat of pure devotion, and is borne aloft by a host of angelic harmonies."

== Chart performance ==
"Acapella" is Kelis's third solo U.S. dance chart-topper and first since 2003's "Milkshake", not including her 2004 feature on Enrique Iglesias's "Not in Love" that also reached the top of the dance chart. It remained at number one for one week, but the single did fail to chart on the Billboard Hot 100.

On April 15, 2010, "Acapella" debuted on the Irish Singles Chart at number 30, and climbed two places to 28 the following week. On its third week in the chart, the single rose a further 6 places to its current peak of 22. By the fifth week the single rose to number 17 on the Irish music charts breaking into the top 20. In the United Kingdom, the song debuted on the UK Singles Chart at number five making it the singer's sixth top-five hit and ninth top-ten hit on the chart. In its second week it fell to number seven, however on the UK Dance Chart it went to number one for two consecutive weeks.

In Germany, it is her most successful single since "Trick Me" from the year 2004, reaching number 21.

== Music video ==
The video was filmed in Los Angeles on February 19–20, 2010, by British duo Rankin & Chris, consisting of portrait and fashion photographer Rankin and musical director Chris Cottam. It was premiered on the singer's website and released to her official Vevo account on March 29, 2010. A making-of video was released on April 29, 2010.

=== Synopsis ===
The video begins with Kelis walking in a jungle as a huntress and then putting on a crown made out of peacock skin and singing. This scene was filmed in black and white. Another scene shows her in front of a fabric and the next shows her on the floor, demonstrating her breathing. The chorus shows Kelis on a chair with a black background with glitter falling down. The next verse shows the chorus scene in a lion's mouth and then in gold body paint. The chorus shows Kelis in a yellow dress that fills half of the scene, and then the final verse shows her on a desert island dressed in brown. The chorus shows Kelis shooting an arrow in the black and white scene and then the video's ending shows Kelis on the desert island with her baby boy (making his first appearance) on her back in a carrier.

== Impact ==
The song was featured in Christian Dior's "Cruise" fashion show in May 2010.

== Track listing ==
- Digital download
1. "Acapella" – 4:08
- UK remixes EP
1. "Acapella" (Benny Benassi Remix Instrumental) – 6:19
2. "Acapella" (Raw Man Remix) – 3:58
3. "Acapella" (Bimbo Jones Vocal Remix) – 8:04
4. "Acapella" (Monarchy Urania Club Mix) – 7:06
5. "Acapella" (Dave Audé Club Mix) – 8:06
- German EP
1. "Acapella" (Album Version) – 4:08
2. "Acapella" (David Guetta Extended Mix) – 6:56
3. "Acapella" (Bimbo Jones Radio Remix) – 4:13
4. "Acapella" (Monarchy Urania Radio Edit) – 4:12
- German CD single
1. "Acapella" (Radio Edit) – 3:18
2. "Acapella" (Dave Audé Radio Remix) – 8:06
- Australia remixes EP
1. "Acapella" (Benny Benassi Remix) – 6:19
2. "Acapella" (Raw Man Remix) – 3:58
3. "Acapella" (Bimbo Jones Vocal Remix) – 8:04
4. "Acapella" (Monarchy Urania Club Mix) – 7:06
5. "Acapella" (Dave Audé Club Dub Remix) – 7:23
- France digital single
1. "Acapella" (Album Version) – 4:08
2. "Acapella" (Instrumental) – 4:08
3. "Acapella" (A Capella) – 3:42
- US remixes EP
1. "Acapella" (Benny Benassi Remix) – 6:20
2. "Acapella" (David Guetta Extended Mix) – 6:56
3. "Acapella" (Dave Audé Extended Mix) – 8:08
4. "Acapella" (Bimbo Jones Remix) – 8:05
5. "Acapella" (Raw Man Remix) – 3:59
6. "Acapella" (Doman and Gooding Remix) – 6:01

== Personnel and credits ==
=== Recording ===
"Acapella" was recorded at Casa de Kelis and mixed at Gum Prod Studios in Paris.

=== Song ===
- Production – David Guetta
- Co-production – Frédéric Riesterer
- Mixing – David Guetta
- Recording – Brian B Russ
- Lead vocals – Kelis

=== Music video ===
Adapted from VideoStatic.

- Directors – Rankin, Chris Cottam, Nicole Ehrlich
- Producers – Coleen Haynes, Ron Mohrhoff, Nicole Ehrlich
- Production company – HSI Productions
- Director of photography – Christopher Probst
- Editor – Adam "Zuk" Zuckerman
- Production designer – Charles Infante
- Stylist – Paula Bradley
- Hairstylist – Anthony Dickey
- Make-up artist – Kathy Yeung
- Body painter – Nelly Recchia

== Charts ==
=== Weekly charts ===
Chart (2010)	Peak position
Australia (ARIA)	169
Austria (Ö3 Austria Top 40)	36
Belgium (Ultratop 50 Flanders)	9
Belgium (Ultratop 50 Wallonia)	27
Czech Republic Airplay (ČNS IFPI)	36
Europe (European Hot 100 Singles)	20
Germany (GfK)	21
Global Dance Songs (Billboard)	7
Ireland (IRMA)	17
Israel International Airplay (Media Forest)	10
Italy (FIMI)	16
Japan (Japan Hot 100)	87
Netherlands (Dutch Top 40)	9
Netherlands (Single Top 100)	12
Scottish Singles Sales (Official Charts)	3
Slovakia Airplay (ČNS IFPI)	3
Switzerland (Schweizer Hitparade)	61
UK Singles (Official Charts)	5
UK Dance (Official Charts)	1
US Dance Club Songs (Billboard)	1
US Dance Airplay (Billboard)	5

=== Year-end charts ===
Chart (2010)	Position
Belgium (Ultratop 50 Flanders)	52
Netherlands (Dutch Top 40)	52
Netherlands (Single Top 100)	72
Italy (FIMI)	92
UK Singles (OCC)	92
US Dance Club Songs (Billboard)	24

== Certifications ==
Region	Certification	Certified units/sales
United Kingdom (BPI)	Silver	200,000^{^}
^{^} Shipments figures based on certification alone.

== Release history ==
Country	Date	Format	Label
United States	February 23, 2010	Digital download	will.i.am music
France	April 5, 2010	Digital download	Polydor Records
United Kingdom	April 11, 2010	Digital download	Polydor Records
Germany	May 7, 2010	CD single	Universal Music
United Kingdom	May 10, 2010	CD single	Polydor Records
