= 4th of July (Fireworks) =

Single by Kelis

from the album Flesh Tone
- Released: June 8, 2010
- Genre: Electro house
- Length: 5:40
- Label: will.i.am; Interscope
- Songwriters: Kelis Rogers; Jean Baptiste; Damien Leroy; Jamie Munson; Anthony Burns; Vanessa Fischer; Ronald Morris; Jeff Scheven
- Producer: DJ Ammo

Kelis singles chronology
"Acapella" (2010)	"4th of July (Fireworks)" (2010)	"Scream" (2010)

"4th of July (Fireworks)" is the second single from Kelis' fifth studio album, Flesh Tone. It samples "You're My Heart (Pilotpriest Remix)" by Lioness. The song was listed at number 51 on the list of the NME Best Tracks of 2010. Three different art works have been made for the single, one for the CD single and digital EP releases in the United Kingdom, the digital remixes single in the United States and the international single.

== Reception ==
=== Critical reception ===
The song received positive reviews from music critics. Gavin Haynes from NME has said that the song is "mainly frazzled, sonically-saturated electro that reminds us of Speakerboxxx/The Love Below at its most boxing-clever". Robert Copsey from Digital Spy rated it with 4/5 stars, saying "This latest single has a head-spinning structure that sets it apart from the average club track, while the singer uses the accompanying video as an excuse to rock a Native American headdress. However, it's the "You make me high" breakdown that's the real cherry here, making '4th Of July' that rare handbag house banger that's also a lovely, uplifting song about motherhood". A negative review came from Fraser McAlpine from BBC Chart Blog who rated it 2/5 stars, saying "There are dance noises, there is singing, there are words, but they don't ever synthesise into something that makes any kind of impact whatsoever". The Unreality Shout review was positive, awarding it 4/5 stars, saying "'4th Of July (Fireworks)', is a wonderfully written love song. It recalls the same kind of production that was the norm for dance tracks back in 2000–04, whilst enlisting the help of DJ Ammo to update things to create a songs that is both stuttering and slurring, both cold and warm, both happy and melancholy, with a pulsing bass-line, and Kelis' brassy vocals showering the track with icy classiness". The song was a Track Pick from the AllMusic review from Flesh Tone.

=== Chart performance ===
The song was a hit on the US Dance Club Songs, where it peaked at number 4. It also became a top forty hit in Belgium, Slovakia, and the United Kingdom. As well as a top ten hit on the UK Dance Chart.

== Music video ==
The video was co-directed by Kelis, Rankin and Nicole Ehrlich in the desert outside of Los Angeles.

=== Synopsis and concept ===
The video begins with Kelis walking on a desert, there is another scene of her wearing a white full dress suit on the desert, in the chorus, it shows her in front of a red laser ball, the next scene shows her in a glass box with flames and fire coming on the ground, the next chorus shows Kelis with a microphone in front of a lamp that turns orange but normally something for a fake sun, a new scene shows her in a pool full of warm water and dancing in front of fireworks, holding sparklers. As the video ends it shows Kelis waving her arms in the air with effects of fire burning.

=== Release and reception ===
The video debuted June 16, 2010 on YouTube and Vevo. A making version of the video was uploaded June 18, 2010 on Vevo. It started filming in late May 2010. John Rankin Waddel said about the video and he said, The video for the "4th of July (Fireworks)", is kinda a mix of ideas, it is a very hot video, that the idea of, the minute you hear the song you feel good right away, so we wanted it, to make a warm video. The material in the video is wearing big long dresses, Normally, the dresses are shoulder-ed or none-shoulder-ed. The video uses heat or electrical stuff, with light. The music video was filmed one day from an early morning to a late night. Photos of the video was posted a few days before the video premiered. It made it television debut in late June 2010. A teaser was posted on June 11, 2010.

== Live performances ==
Kelis performed the song for the first time on The Tonight Show with Jay Leno on June 18, 2010. Kelis performed the song on The Today Show and 106 and Park. In the United Kingdom, Kelis performed the song on Later with Jools Holland, the Glastonbury Festival 2010 and on July 4, 2010, she performed it on T4 on the Beach as well as Alan Carr: Chatty Man which aired that same night.

== Track listing ==
- Digital download
1. "4th of July (Fireworks)" – 5:29
- CD single
1. "4th of July (Fireworks)" (Radio Edit) – 3:10
2. "4th of July (Fireworks)" (Calvin Harris Remix) – 5:38
- UK remixes EP
1. "4th of July (Fireworks)" (Club Version) – 3:39
2. "4th of July (Fireworks)" (Richard X Remix) – 6:20
3. "4th of July (Fireworks)" (Calvin Harris Remix) – 5:38
- U.S. "4th of July (Fireworks)" – The Remixes EP
1. "4th of July (Fireworks)" (Rusko Remix) – 4:10
2. "4th of July (Fireworks)" (Richard X Remix) – 6:20
3. "4th of July (Fireworks)" (Burns Remix) – 5:22
4. "4th of July (Fireworks)" (Calvin Harris Remix) – 5:39
5. "4th of July (Fireworks)" (Fernando Garibay Remix) – 5:17
- U.S. remixes – EP
1. "4th of July (Fireworks)" (DJ DLG Lazor Arena Remix) – 7:07
2. "4th of July (Fireworks)" (WaWa Remix) – 3:10
3. "4th of July (Fireworks)" (Saul Ruiz Club Mix) – 7:33
4. "4th of July (Fireworks)" (Hector Fonseca Remix) – 8:56
5. "4th of July (Fireworks)" (Zoned Out Remix) – 7:47

== Credits and personnel ==
"4th of July (Fireworks)" was recorded at Casa de Kelis and was mixed at Paper V.U. Studios.

- Written by: Kelis, Jean Baptiste, Damien "Ammo" Leroy, Jamie Munson, Anthony Scott Burns, Vanessa Fischer, Ronald Morris, Jeff Scheven
- Produced by: Damien "Ammo" Leroy
- Instruments: Damien "Ammo" Leroy
- Recorded by: Brian B Russ
- Mixed by: Dylan Dresdow

== Charts ==
Chart (2010)	Peak Position
Belgium (Ultratip Bubbling Under Flanders)	2
Belgium (Ultratip Bubbling Under Wallonia)	36
Czech Republic Airplay (ČNS IFPI)	41
Global Dance Songs (Billboard)	14
Netherlands (Dutch Top 40 Tipparade)	16
Scottish Singles Sales (Official Charts)	31
Slovakia Airplay (ČNS IFPI)	37
UK Singles (Official Charts)	32
UK Dance (Official Charts)	6
US Dance Club Songs (Billboard)	4
US Dance Singles Sales (Billboard)	10

== Release history ==
Country	Date	Format	Label
United States	June 8, 2010	Digital download	will.i.am
United Kingdom	July 4, 2010	Digital download	Polydor
United Kingdom	July 5, 2010	CD single	Polydor
