= Anthony Dickey =

American hairstylist

Anthony Dickey, known professionally as Dickey, is an American hairstylist known for his expertise in all hair textures, especially wavy, curly and kinky. He is the co-founder of Hair Rules New York, the first and only multi-textural salon in the U.S.

== Early life ==
Born biracial in Seattle, Washington, Dickey moved to Arizona out of high school. While working at a gas station, his aunt sent him to beauty school in San Francisco.

== Career ==
In 1989, Dickey moved to New York and worked for revered salons such as Oribe, John Frieda, and Louis Lacari. In 1995, he was booked for Sports Illustrated, marking the beginning of a successful editorial career. Since then his work has been featured in L’Uomo Vogue, Vogue, Essence, Vanity Fair, Glamour, and Harper’s Bazaar, gaining a reputation for “unmanageable” textures.

In 2003, he wrote the book “Hair Rules! The Ultimate Hair Care Guide for Women with Kinky, Curly, or Wavy Hair” (Random House, 2003). Five years later, in 2008, he established the Hair Rules product line, and the following year, the Hair Rules New York salon in New York's Hell’s Kitchen.

Dubbed a "style Svengali" by The New York Times, Dickey has styled such celebrities as Sarah Jessica Parker, Minnie Driver, Rihanna, Solange, Michelle Obama, and Jill Scott. Presently, he is a contributor for Huffington Post and host of the show “Ask Dickey!” on YouTube.
