= Scream (Kelis song) =

Song by Kelis

Single by Kelis

from the album Flesh Tone
- Released: October 10, 2010
- Recorded: Casa de Kelis (Los Angeles)
- Genre: EDM; techno; electroclash
- Length: 3:30
- Label: will.i.am, Interscope
- Songwriters: Kelis Rogers, Jean Baptiste, David Guetta, Roman Böer
- Producers: Tocadisco; David Guetta

Kelis singles chronology
"4th of July (Fireworks)" (2010)	"Scream" (2010)	"Brave" (2011)

"Scream" is a song performed by American recording artist Kelis, taken from her fifth studio album, Flesh Tone, written by Kelis and Jean Baptiste, and co-written and produced by David Guetta and Tocadisco. It was released in October 2010, as the album's third single by will.i.am music, to coincide with the European leg of the Kelis' All Hearts tour. It was mainly met with positive reception from music critics, who praised the song's genre-shifting production and the empowering message in Kelis' lyrics.

Described as a song which lends itself to live performances, "Scream" was compared by music critics to songs by Dutch disc-jockey Fedde Le Grand, although critics noted that Kelis' vocals were layered as opposed to sung. An accompanying music video was directed by Rankin, and features several different scenes based on fashion and colors. Kelis is seen in couture outfits and neon bodypaint, as well as running on a treadmill in a London estate. The video was also produced in digital 3-D. "Scream" was performed live on The Alan Titchmarsh Show and the Summer Sets concert series for Vevo. "Scream" became a minor hit in Belgium, where it reached top-twenty on the Flanders Ultratip chart.

== Style and composition ==
Kelis – "Scream"
A 21 second sample from "Scream", where the refrain's electro house production changes into EDM and hip hop.

"Scream" is an up-tempo, electro-dance and techno song with elements of house. The music and lyrics were written by Kelis, Jean Baptiste, David Guetta and Roman Böer. NME's Gavin Haynes commented on the song during his technical review of Flesh Tone. He said "Scream" had a blues melody which makes use of rinky dink sounds, an instrument often played at music festivals. Many other critics stated how the song's composition could be split into different sections, sometimes like "a beat-free beach house piano-based meditation" while at other times, sounding like "haughty electroclash ingenue". Nick Levine from Digital Spy noted that "Scream" had distinct shifts in genre, from house verses to electronica choruses. Levine also pointed out that Kelis takes on a rap music style during the choruses. In the song's bridge, the main melody "evaporates" before returning with "staccato notes" and Kelis speaking, instead of singing, over a midsection with electronic percussion. Disc jockey Ron Slomowicz (from About.com) said it was the type of song that was best experienced live.

== Release and chart performance ==
The release of "Scream" was announced to coincide with the European leg of Kelis' All Hearts tour. Kelis first performed "Scream" on September 16, 2010 for the Summer Sets concert series with the Vevo network. She also performed the song on October 5, 2010 on The Alan Titchmarsh Show, where it was reported that things did not go as planned. According to The Mirror, the singer was left partially exposed after a small wardrobe malfunction, near the end of the performance. "Scream" only charted in Belgium, where it peaked at number eighteen on the Belgium Ultratip Flanders chart.

== Critical reception ==
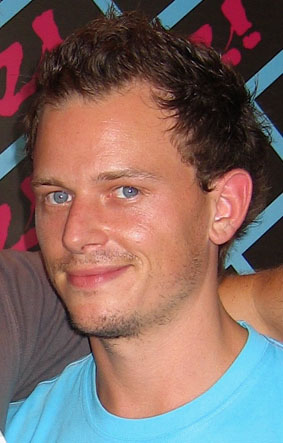
BBC Music compared the song to works by Dutch house DJ, Fedde le Grand.

The song received generally mixed to positive reviews. Pitchfork Media's Jess Harvell gave the song a mixed review saying "All of this subgenre synthesizing is a bit shameless. It's also frequently great, at least if you're already enamored with big, bright, synthetic dance music." However, Sal Cinquenmani of Slant Magazine liked the song because it represented Kelis well: "another Guetta track, 'Scream' comes closest to capturing the long-established anti-establishment bent of Kelis's work". Sarah Bee of BBC Music agreed compared the song to works by Dutch house DJ Fedde Le Grand, saying that the overall effect was "Wow!". David Buchanan of the New York City and Chicago-based online music publication Consequence of Sound said "Scream defies its namesake by coming off like a plea for optimism and kindness set to alternating piano and dance beats; Kelis never drops the ball on her seamless rhythm here, though her vocals (which precede her own name in the fame game) tend to be locked in on a single delivery of keys that come across layered into the techno rather than sung upon it." Robert Copsey from Digital Spy agreed with the other reviewers. He said "although 'Scream' is not an instant hit, it continues to spread Kelis' message of dance or be danced on". He concluded by saying "for a woman who claims here that she hadn't 'had faith in such a long time', it sure sounds like she's found her Mecca."

== Music video ==
The music video for "Scream" premiered on September 28, 2010. It was filmed the last days of August 2010 and was direcred by John "Rankin" Wadell. "Scream" was also filmed in digital 3D, and released to Kelis' YouTube page a week after the original version premiered. The video begins with Kelis running on a treadmill, facing the camera, on the Wendling Estate in Gospel Oak, London, UK. This scene is intersected with several others including: ones where Kelis wears an elaborate purple headpiece and matching bodysuit, a scene where she is covered in neon glow-in-the-dark bodypaint, and wearing a black head piece that resembles wings. During the chorus, Kelis is seen against a white backdrop with large fake eyelashes as she waves her hands to the music. She is then seen wrapped in chains trying to break free. Leading into the next verse, the video transitions back to the opening treadmill scenes. When the chorus plays for the second time, Kelis wears a headpiece with several thin black rods sticking out of it and dances in time to the music. Other scenes include more neon bodypaint shots, and a new scene where she swings from a rope hanging from the ceiling, while wearing a sparkling black wig. The video ends with a shot of Kelis, in the bodypaint, saying "Scream".

The treadmill scenes were filmed at the Wendling Estate and nearby Bacton Tower in London, UK. Other scenes were filmed in Ibiza, Spain. According to Digital Spy's Robert Copsey, the concept of the video was a simple one, "Kelis wearing various couture outfits", while Robbie Daw, from the music news website Idolator, later described the video as a collection of fashion snapshots and ensembles. "There are various shots of Kelis in some OTT fashion ensembles (huge fake eyelashes, lace winged hat, chains) with a recurring image of her in a human body suit, jogging in place." Ron Slomowicz from About.com said "Live, the crowd goes ballistic [for this song]. The video brilliantly tries to bring that feeling to you as a viewer by presenting the songstress in blue and red 3d."

== Track listing ==
- Digital Download
1. "Scream" – 3:30
- Digital Remixes EP
1. "Scream" (AL-P of MSTRKRFT Remix) – 4:01
2. "Scream" (LA Riots Remix) – 6:32
3. "Scream" (Russ Chimes Remix) – 6:25
4. "Scream" (RUXPIN Remix) – 4:55
5. "Scream" (Shameboy Remix) – 5:38

== Credits ==
"Scream" was recorded at 'Casa de Kelis' and mixed at 'Gum Prod Studio' in Paris.

- Jean Baptiste – songwriter
- Ryan Buendia (DJ Replay) – recording engineer
- Roman De Garcez (El Tocadisco) – co-producer, songwriter, guitar
- David Guetta – mix engineer, producer, programming
- Neil Jacobson – background vocalist
- Kelis Rogers – songwriter, lead vocals

== Charts ==
Chart (2010)	Peak position
Belgium (Ultratip Bubbling Under Flanders)	18

== Release history ==
Region	Date	Format	Label
Belgium	October 10, 2010	Digital remixes EP	Universal Music
United Kingdom	October 10, 2010	Digital download, digital remixes EP	Polydor Records
France	October 19, 2010	Digital remixes EP	Universal Music
Germany	October 19, 2010	Digital remixes EP	Universal Music
