= Looking for a Man in Finance =

2024 viral TikTok trend

- Cover for various versions

Single by Megan Boni
- Released: 2024
- Recorded: 2024
- Studio: Megan's Home
- Genre: Depends on the version
- Songwriter: Megan Boni
- Producer: Depends on the version

Megan Boni singles chronology
"Looking for a Man in Finance" (2024)	"Let's Connect (After Coachella)" (2026)

Girl on Couch - Can someone make this into an actual song plz just for funzies
A five-second sample of the original TikTok clip

"Looking for a Man in Finance" or simply "Man in Finance" is a satirical song written by singer Megan Boni known as @girl_on_couch on the social media platform TikTok.

== Background ==
Megan Boni was primarily working in sales when her a cappella song went viral. Boni was inspired to make the song when she was thinking about single women complaining about their relationship status but had unrealistic expectations of men. She includes herself in this category. She stated that it "was 100 percent a parody".

Boni originally posted on April 30, 2024, with the text overlay saying "Did I just write the song of the summer?" The video was 19-seconds long and the lyrics delivered with an upbeat tempo. She states it only took a few minutes to make the song.

Three weeks after sharing her video on TikTok, it was viewed more than 26 million times. The song has led to numerous remixes. Boni in fact requested to her audience that DJs remix it with the caption "Can someone make this into an actual song plz just for funzies." After her song went viral, she quit her job and started working to promote her music career. She signed a label deal with Capitol/Polydor/Virgin Germany.

On May 17, 2024, Boni and songwriting duo Billen Ted released the single "Man in Finance (G6 Trust Fund)" on Spotify and other streaming services.

== Song description ==
The lyrics describe looking for a tall, wealthy man working in the financial sector to be in a relationship with. The song begins with Boni saying "I'm looking for a man in finance, with a trust fund, 6' 5", blue eyes." It continues to repeat the lyrics. She delivers the lyrics in a rhythmic manner and incorporates vocal fry.

For a version of the song made for Loud Luxury, lyrics were added "Guys, I'm still fucking looking for my man. Will you help me find my man?" The G6 Trust Fund remix has an intro where she says (presumably in a call) "Hi, yeah, I just left the date And I dunno, am I asking for too much? And this guy was really cute and he was a musician and he was super passionate about what he did But I don't know, all l'm looking for".

== Notable remixes ==
One remix that samples the 2010 single "Like a G6" by Far East Movement is a popular version by TikToker @rubythepookie. Dutch DJ Nicky Romero and TikTok creator Tima Pages made their own versions. DJ Malibu Barbie and DJ Hunny Bee created versions that garnered millions of views. David Guetta and Alesso have also created their own remix.

== Cultural impact ==
Numerous variations such as "I'm looking for a man in IT" or "I'm looking for a caesar salad" had surfaced as a result of the original trend.

The song has also led to discussions about the stereotypes and reality of men working in finance.

"Looking for a Man in Finance" has been played in clubs and concerts worldwide.

Several celebrities have referenced the song as well. For instance, musician Finneas shared a version of the song where he is looking for a Wi-Fi network onto which to connect.

Many brands such as Fruit of the Loom, Crocs, and Mr. Clean have engaged with the song and Boni in their marketing.

== Charts ==
Chart performance for "Man in Finance" (with David Guetta and Billen Ted)
Chart (2024)	Peak position
Germany (GfK)	83
Ireland (IRMA)	84
New Zealand Hot Singles (RMNZ)	28
Poland (Polish Airplay Top 100)	36
Sweden Heatseeker (Sverigetopplistan)	1
Switzerland (Schweizer Hitparade)	64
US Hot Dance/Electronic Songs (Billboard)	41
