= Lioness (band) =

Canadian indie rock dance band

- Origin: Toronto, Ontario, Canada
- Genres: Indie rock, Dance
- Years active: 2007–present
- Labels: New Romantic
- Members: Vanessa Magic; Ronnie Morris; Jeff Scheven

Lioness is a Canadian indie rock dance band formed in January 2007 in Toronto, Ontario, Canada.

== History ==
The band was formed by Ronnie Morris and Jeff Scheven, former rhythm section of controller.controller (Paper Bag Records) and No Dynamics' vocalist Vanessa Magic. Lioness released their debut self-titled EP, Lioness on October 21, 2008, on New Romantic.

Playing in low-key after-hours sets in off-the-radar locales in Toronto has led to supporting appearances with Hercules and Love Affair, !!!, You Say Party! We Say Die!, and k-os.

Their sound combines dark disco grooves of Scheven's heavy drumming with Morris' unique bass sound and is conspicuous for its lack of guitars. Magic draws upon jazz, old soul and blues, roaring over layers of electronic squall. On stage, they are a synthesis of electronic rock band and performance art project, a drum and bass wall of sound bathed in red light.

In 2009, Lioness took part in an interactive documentary series called City Sonic. The series, which featured 20 Toronto artists, had them talk about Toronto’s Masonic Temple and the band's attraction to the mystery of the Freemasons.

== Members ==
=== Current ===
- Vanessa Magic (2007–present)
- Ronnie Morris (2007–present)
- Jeff Scheven (2007–present)

== Discography ==
- Lioness EP, 2008
- Omens, Oracles & Signs – Vol. 1, 2009
- Omens, Oracles & Signs – Vol. 2, 2010
- The Golden Killer, 2012

== See also ==
- Music of Canada
- Canadian rock
- List of Canadian musicians
- List of bands from Canada
- Category:Canadian musical groups
